= 2026 Winter Paralympics Parade of Nations =

During the opening ceremony

During the Parade of Nations within the Milano and Cortina d'Ampezzo 2026 Winter Paralympics opening ceremony, athletes and officials from each participating country marched in the Verona Arena preceded by their flag and placard bearer. Each flag bearer had been chosen either by the nation's National Paralympic Committee or by the athletes themselves.

== Parade order ==
Nations marched in the order of the host language, Italian language. Italy entered last as host, and the United States entered third-to-last as upcoming hosts, France entered second-to-last as upcoming hosts.

== List ==
The following is a list of each country's flag bearer. The list is sorted by the sequence that each nation appeared in the parade of nations. The names are given in their official designations by the International Paralympic Committee, and the Italian names follow their official designations by the Milano Cortina Organizing Committee for the Paralympic Games.

| Order | Nation | Italian | Flag bearer | Sport | Ref. |
|---|---|---|---|---|---|
| 1 | Andorra | Andorra | Roger Puig Davi | Para alpine skiing | |
| 2 | Argentina | Argentina | Enrique Plantey | Para alpine skiing | |
| 3 | Armenia | Armenia | Garik Melkonyan | Para cross-country skiing | |
| 4 | Australia | Australia | Georgia Gunew | Para alpine skiing | |
| 4 | Australia | Australia | Ben Tudhope | Para snowboard | |
| 5 | Austria | Austria | Veronika Aigner | Para alpine skiing | |
| 5 | Austria | Austria | Markus Salcher | Para alpine skiing | |
| 6 | Belgium | Belgio | Maximilien Seeger | Para alpine skiing | |
| 7 | Belarus | Bielorussia | Lidziya Loban | Para cross-country skiing | |
| 8 | Bosnia and Herzegovina | Bosnia Erzegovina | Ilma Kazazić | Para alpine skiing | |
| 9 | Brazil | Brasile | Aline Rocha | Para cross-country skiing | |
| 9 | Brazil | Brasile | Cristian Ribera | Para cross-country skiing | |
| 10 | Bulgaria | Bulgaria | Stela Yanchovichina | Para alpine skiing | |
| 11 | Canada | Canada | Tyler McGregor | Para ice hockey | |
| 11 | Canada | Canada | Natalie Wilkie | Para cross-country skiing | |
| 12 | Czech Republic | Cechia | No flagbearers (Note: The Czech Republic, Estonia, Finland, Latvia, Lithuania, Poland and Ukraine boycotted the opening ceremony in protest against the International Paralympic Committee's (IPC) decision to allow athletes from Russia and Belarus to compete under their national flags and anthems at the Paralympics.) | | |
| 13 | Chile | Cile | Nicolás Bisquertt | Para alpine skiing | |
| 14 | China | Repubblica Popolare Cinese | Liu Sitong | Para alpine skiing | |
| 14 | China | Repubblica Popolare Cinese | Ji Lijia | Para snowboard | |
| 15 | South Korea | Repubblica di Corea | Kim Yun-ji | Para cross-country skiing | |
| 15 | South Korea | Repubblica di Corea | Lee Yong-suk | Wheelchair curling | |
| 16 | Croatia | Croazia | Lucija Smetiško | Para alpine skiing | |
| 16 | Croatia | Croazia | Dino Sokolović | Para alpine skiing | |
| 17 | Denmark | Danimarca | Adam Nybo | Para alpine skiing | |
| 18 | El Salvador | El Salvador | David Chavez | Para cross-country skiing | |
| 19 | Estonia | Estonia | No flagbearers | | |
| 20 | Finland | Finlandia | No flagbearers | | |
| 21 | Georgia | Georgia | Temuri Dadiani | Para cross-country skiing | |
| 22 | Germany | Germania | Anna-Lena Forster | Para alpine skiing | |
| 22 | Germany | Germania | Jörg Wedde | Para ice hockey | |
| 23 | Japan | Giappone | Aki Ogawa | Wheelchair curling | |
| 23 | Japan | Giappone | Junta Kosuda | Para snowboard | |
| 24 | Great Britain | Gran Bretagna | Menna Fitzpatrick | Para alpine skiing | |
| 24 | Great Britain | Gran Bretagna | Scott Meenagh | Para biathlon | |
| 25 | Greece | Grecia | Eva Nikou | Para alpine skiing | |
| 25 | Greece | Grecia | Konstantinos Petrakis | Para snowboard | |
| 26 | Haiti | Haiti | Ralf Étienne | Para alpine skiing | |
| 27 | Iceland | Islanda | Arna Albertsdóttir | Para cross-country skiing | |
| 28 | Israel | Israele | Sheina Vaspi | Para alpine skiing | |
| 29 | Kazakhstan | Kazakistan | Nurlan Alimov | Para cross-country skiing | |
| 30 | Latvia | Letonia | No flagbearers | | |
| 31 | Liechtenstein | Liechtenstein | Sarah Hundert | Para alpine skiing | |
| 32 | Lithuania | Lituania | No flagbearers | | |
| 33 | North Macedonia | Macedonia del Nord | Zoran Jovanovski | Para alpine skiing | |
| 34 | Mexico | Messico | Arly Velásquez | Para alpine skiing | |
| 35 | Mongolia | Mongolia | Tsegmidiin Dashdorj | Para cross-country skiing | |
| 36 | Montenegro | Montenegro | Andrej Šibalić | Para snowboard | |
| 37 | Norway | Norvegia | Vilde Nilsen | Para cross-country skiing | |
| 37 | Norway | Norvegia | Jesper Pedersen | Para alpine skiing | |
| 38 | New Zealand | Nuova Zelanda | Adam Hall | Para alpine skiing | |
| 39 | Netherlands | Paesi Bassi | Claire Petit | Para alpine skiing | |
| 39 | Netherlands | Paesi Bassi | Jeroen Kampschreur | Para alpine skiing | |
| 40 | Poland | Polonia | No flagbearers | | |
| 41 | Puerto Rico | Porto Rico | Orlando Pérez | Para alpine skiing | |
| 42 | Portugal | Portogallo | Diogo Carmona | Para snowboard | |
| 43 | Romania | Romania | Mihăiță Papară | Para snowboard | |
| 44 | Russia | Federazione Russa | Anastasiia Bagiian | Para cross-country skiing | |
| 44 | Russia | Federazione Russa | Alexey Bugaev | Para alpine skiing | |
| 45 | Serbia | Serbia | Luka Bilčar | Para alpine skiing | |
| 46 | Slovakia | Slovacchia | Miroslav Haraus | Para alpine skiing | |
| 47 | Slovenia | Slovenia | Tabea Dolžan | Para cross-country skiing | |
| 48 | Spain | Spagna | Audrey Pascual | Para alpine skiing | |
| 49 | Sweden | Svezia | Ebba Årsjö | Para alpine skiing | |
| 49 | Sweden | Svezia | Zebastian Modin | Para cross-country skiing | |
| 50 | Switzerland | Svizzera | Theo Gmür | Para alpine skiing | |
| 51 | Ukraine | Ucraina | No flagbearers | | |
| 52 | Uzbekistan | Uzbekistan | Yulduz Makhmudova | Para alpine skiing | |
| 52 | Uzbekistan | Uzbekistan | Firdavs Khudoyatov | Para alpine skiing | |
| 53 | United States | Stati Uniti d'America | Laurie Stephens | Para alpine skiing | |
| 53 | United States | Stati Uniti d'America | Josh Paul | Para ice hockey | |
| 54 | France | Francia | Cécile Hernandez | Para snowboard | |
| 54 | France | Francia | Jordan Broisin | Para alpine skiing | |
| 55 | Italy | Italia | Chiara Mazzel | Para alpine skiing | |
| 55 | Italy | Italia | René De Silvestro | Para alpine skiing | |

== See also ==
- 2026 Winter Olympics Parade of Nations
