= Puerto Rico at the 2026 Winter Paralympics =

- Flag of Puerto Rico
- IPC code: PUR
- NPC: Comite Paralimpico de Puerto Rico

in Milan and Cortina d'Ampezzo, Italy 6 March 2026 – 15 March 2026
- Competitors: 1 (1 man) in 1 sport
- Flag bearer (opening): Orlando Pérez
- Flag bearer (closing): Orlando Pérez
- Medals: Gold 0 Silver 0 Bronze 0 Total 0

Winter Paralympics appearances (overview)
- 2022; 2026

Puerto Rico will compete at the 2026 Winter Paralympics in Milan and Cortina d'Ampezzo, Italy, which will take place between 6–15 March 2026.

== Competitors ==
The following is the list of number of competitors participating at the Games per sport/discipline.

Sport	Men	Women	Total
Para alpine skiing	1	0	1
Total	1	0	1

== Para alpine skiing ==
Athlete	Event	Run 1		Run 2		Total	
Athlete	Event	Time	Rank	Time	Rank	Time	Rank
Orlando Pérez	Men's giant slalom, sitting	1:47.96	22	DNF			
