= Orlando Pérez =

Puerto Rican para-alpine skier (born 1975)

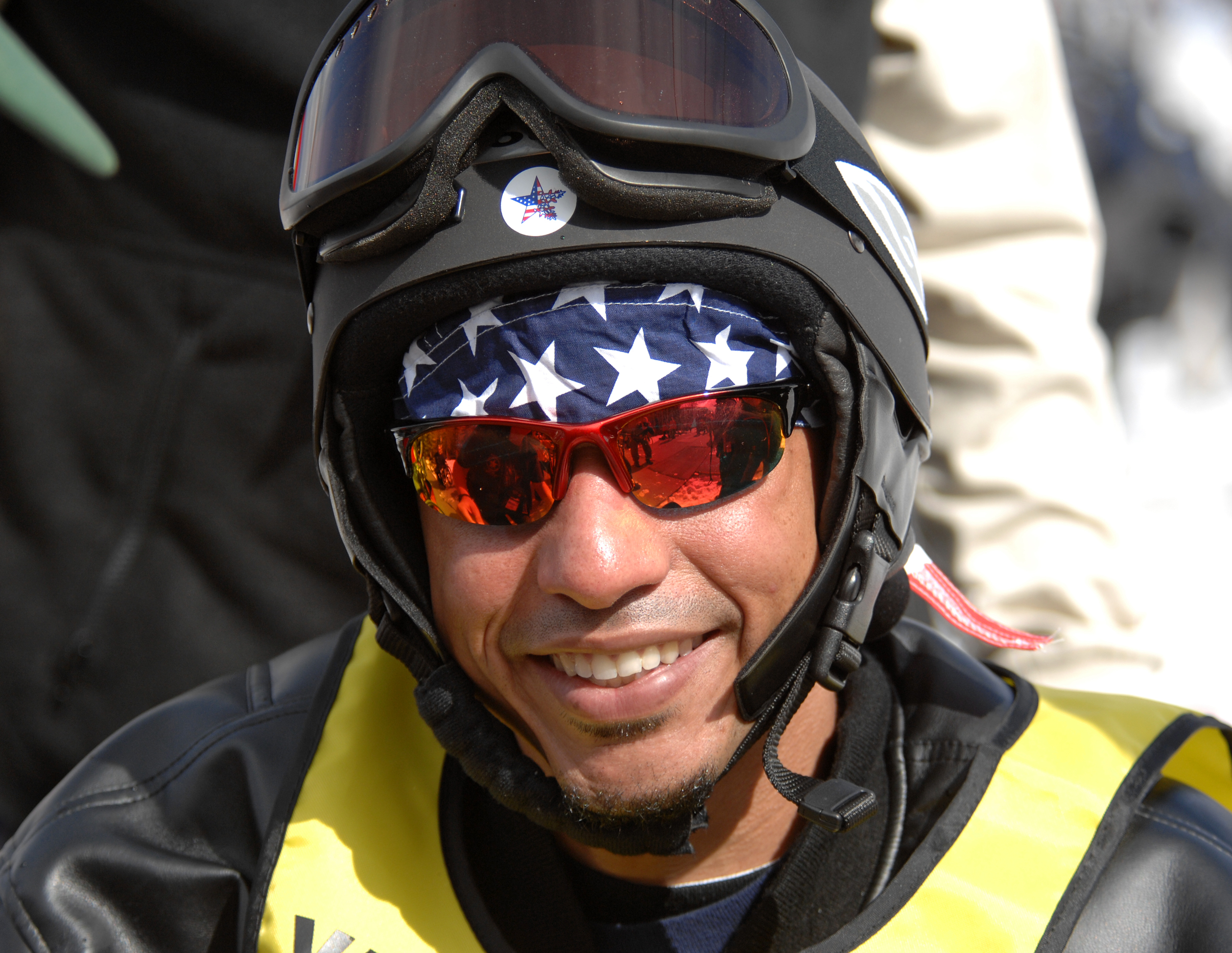
- Pérez in 2007

Personal information
- Nationality: Puerto Rican
- Born: 8 April 1975 (age 51) San Juan, Puerto Rico

Sport
- Sport: Para-alpine skiing
- Disability class: LW10-1

Achievements and titles
- Paralympic finals: Beijing 2022, Milan/Cortina 2026

Orlando Pérez (born 8 April 1975) is a Puerto Rican para-alpine skier who competes in the sitting classification LW10-1. He represented Puerto Rico at the 2022 Winter Paralympics and was selected again for the 2026 Winter Paralympics.

== Biography ==
Pérez was born on 8 April 1975 in San Juan, Puerto Rico. He later became involved in adaptive alpine skiing following a spinal cord tumor removal that left him paralyzed. Pérez has competed internationally as a mono-skier in para-alpine skiing events.

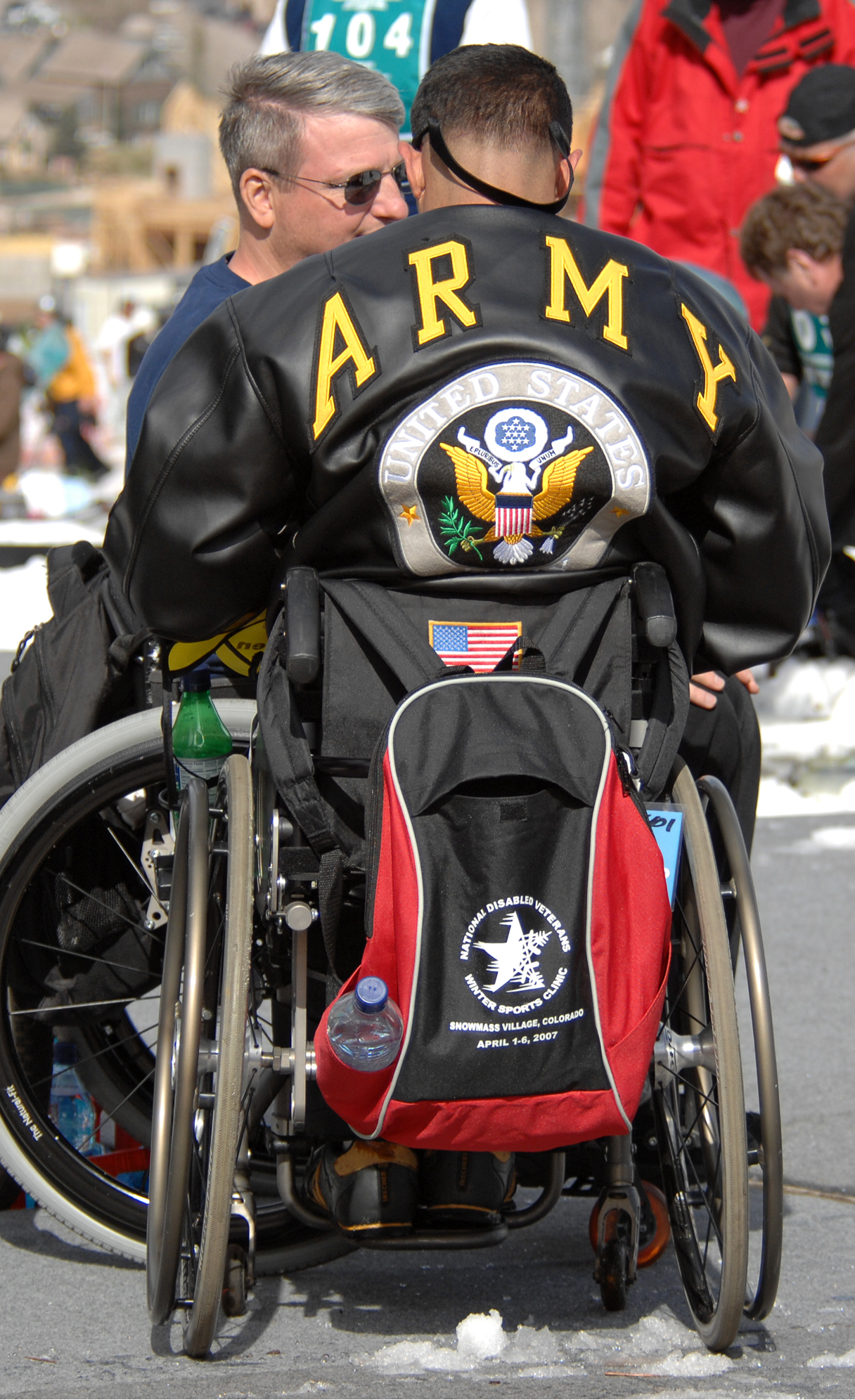
Pérez (seeing at the back) as United States Army person during the National Disabled Veterans Winter Sports Clinic in 2007

Pérez is a private first class in the United States Army. He became the first athlete from Puerto Rico to compete at the Winter Paralympic Games when he was selected for the 2022 Winter Paralympics in Beijing. He was chosen as Puerto Rico's flagbearer for the 2022 Winter Paralympics opening ceremony.

At the 2022 Paralympic Games he competed in the men's giant slalom sitting and slalom sitting events but did not finish either race. Pérez later qualified again for the 2026 Winter Paralympics in Milan and Cortina d'Ampezzo, where he was also again the Puerto Rico's flagbearer for the 2026 Winter Paralympics opening ceremony.

Outside of competition, Pérez has participated in adaptive sports events and outreach programs. In January 2025 he was invited by Common Ground Outdoor Adventures to speak about his experiences as a Paralympic athlete and professional para-athlete and to take part in adaptive skiing activities at Beaver Mountain Ski Resort in Utah.

Pérez has also taken part in events such as the Hartford Ski Spectacular at Breckenridge Ski Resort, a winter sports festival for athletes with physical disabilities where participants train and compete in adaptive skiing disciplines.
