= Belgium at the 2026 Winter Paralympics =

- Flag of Belgium
- IPC code: BEL
- NPC: Belgian Paralympic Committee
- Website: www.paralympic.be/nl

in Milan and Cortina d'Ampezzo, Italy 6 March 2026 – 15 March 2026
- Competitors: 3 (2 sitting, 1 visually impaired) in 1 sport
- Flag bearer (opening): Maximilien Seeger
- Flag bearers (closing): Marte Goossen & Jérémie Pregardien
- Medals: Gold 0 Silver 0 Bronze 0 Total 0

Winter Paralympics appearances (overview)
- 1976; 1980; 1984; 1988; 1992; 1994; 1998–2002; 2006; 2010; 2014; 2018; 2022; 2026

Belgium will compete at the 2026 Winter Paralympics in Milan and Cortina d'Ampezzo, Italy which will take place between 6–15 March 2026. Three alpine skiers were selected to compete.

== Competitors ==
The following is the list of number of competitors participating at the Games per sport/discipline.

Sport	Men	Women	Total
Alpine skiing	2	1	3
Total	2	1	3

== Para alpine skiing ==
Athlete	Event	Run 1		Run 2		Total	
Athlete	Event	Time	Rank	Time	Rank	Time	Rank
Jérémie Prégardien	Men's giant slalom, sitting	DNF					
Jérémie Prégardien	Men's slalom, sitting	DNF					
Maximilien Seeger; Guide: Jérémy Mestdagh	Men's downhill, visually impaired	—N/a				DNF	
Maximilien Seeger; Guide: Jérémy Mestdagh	Men's super-G, visually impaired	—N/a				1:20.64	9
Maximilien Seeger; Guide: Jérémy Mestdagh	Men's giant slalom, visually impaired	1:12.22	8	1:16.36	11	2:28.58	10
Maximilien Seeger; Guide: Jérémy Mestdagh	Men's slalom, visually impaired	54.73	10	51.07	10	1:45.80	10
Maximilien Seeger; Guide: Jérémy Mestdagh	Men's super combined, visually impaired	1:22.31	10	51.23	10	2:13.54	10
Marte Goossen	Women's giant slalom, sitting	1:25.97	9	1:29.36	7	2:55.33	7
Marte Goossen	Women's slalom, sitting	47.25	6	49.76	7	1:37.01	6

== See also ==
- Belgium at the Paralympics
- Belgium at the 2026 Winter Olympics
