= 2026 Winter Paralympics torch relay =

- Host city: Milan and Cortina d'Ampezzo, Italy
- Countries visited: United Kingdom; Italy
- Distance: 2,000 kilometres (1,200 mi)
- Torchbearers: 501
- Theme: The Greatest Journey
- Start date: 24 February 2026
- End date: 6 March 2026

The torch relay (Italian: Il Viaggio della Fiamma Paralimpica, lit. 'The voyage of the Paralympic flame') for the 2026 Winter Paralympics, jointly hosted by the Italian cities of Milan and Cortina d'Ampezzo, ran from 24 February to 6 March. Following the lighting of the Paralympic Flame in Stoke Mandeville, United Kingdom, the relay concluded in Verona, Italy, to coincide with the opening ceremony at the Verona Arena. The route for the Paralympic torch relay was presented by the Fondazione Milano Cortina 2026 on 26 November 2024, one year before the start of the Olympic torch relay, which was unveiled at the same time.

The flame was lit at the Stoke Mandeville Hospital, the "spiritual birthplace" of the Paralympic movement, as is the case for all Paralympic torches from 2014 onwards. The subsequent route in Italy covered 2,000 kilometres (1,200 mi) over 11 days. The torch relay involved 501 torchbearers, with applications opening on 12 February 2025.

On 29 November 2024, Italian comedy trio Gli Autogol were announced as official narrators for the torch relay. The design of the torch was unveiled on 14 April at Expo 2025 in Osaka, Japan, as well as simultaneously in Milan; Osaka and Milan are twin cities.

== Events ==
From 24 February to 2 March 2026, the flame was split into five sparks: Milan, Turin, Bolzano, Trento, and Trieste. The flames was then combined in a unifying ceremony in Cortina d'Ampezzo on 3 March.

Location of flame festivals (yellow dots) and stops along the torch relay (red dots) in northern Italy

== Stops ==
The subsequent torch relay legs visited Venice on 4 March, followed by Padua the following day; both cities hosted own local celebrations. The relay ended on 6 March in Verona to coincide with the 2026 Winter Paralympics opening ceremony.

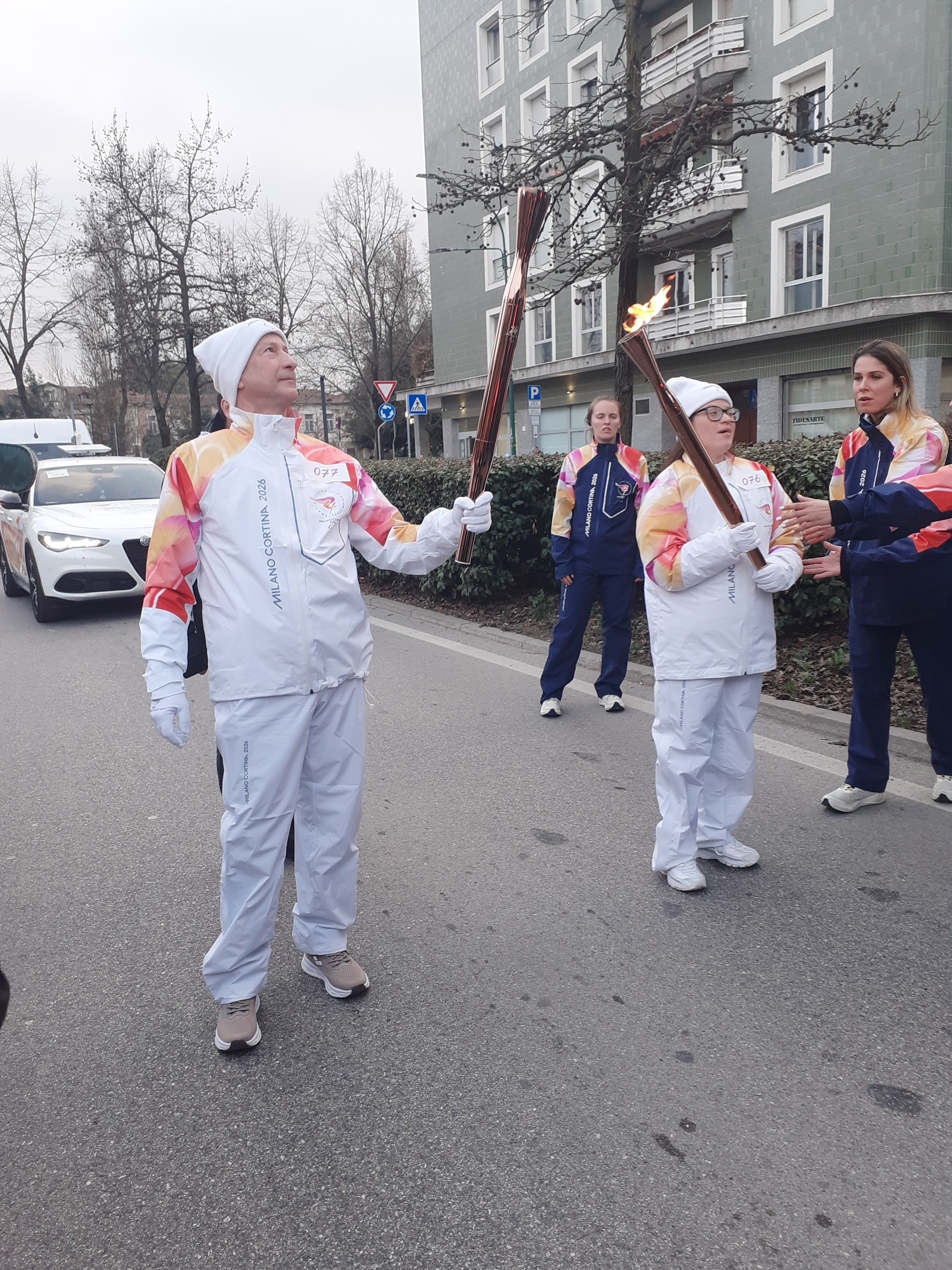
The Paralympic flame arrives in Mestre, Venice (4th March)

Stages of the 2026 Winter Paralympic torch relay in Italy
Day	Stage	Date	Region	Stops	Notable torchbearers
1	From Dolomites to Venice	4 Mar 2026	Veneto	Auronzo di Cadore; Pieve di Cadore; Longarone; Belluno; Treviso; Mestre; Venezia	Giada Canino; Manuel Frigo; Matilde Villa
2	From Province of Treviso to Padua	5 Mar 2026	Veneto	Castelfranco Veneto; Asolo; Bassano del Grappa; Thiene; Vicenza; Padua	Chiara Coltri; Elisa Giordano; Elisa Molinarolo; Francesca Tarantello
3	Verona, gran final	6 Mar 2026	Veneto	Monselice; Rovigo; Legnago; Nogara; Isola della Scala; Verona	Alice D'Amato; Asia D'Amato; Lorenzo Bonicelli; Angelo Zanotti; Michele Ferrarin; Bebe Vio

Bebe Vio was the final torchbearer at the Opening Ceremony in the Verona Arena: the Paralympic fencer handed over the torchlight to the performers, who then virtually carried it in their hands to Milan and Cortina, where the final torchbearers, Gianmaria Dal Maistro and Francesca Porcellato, lit the Paralympic cauldrons.

== See also ==
- 2026 Winter Olympics torch relay
