= David Chávez =

David Chávez may refer to:

- David Chávez (attorney) (1897–1984), American attorney and jurist
- David Chávez (skier) (born 1999), Salvadoran cross country skier
