= David Chávez (skier) =

Salvadoran para cross-country skier (born 1999)

Personal information
- Nationality: Salvadoran
- Born: 2 March 1999 (age 27) San Salvador, El Salvador

Sport
- Sport: Para cross-country skiing
- Disability class: LW10.5

Achievements and titles
- Paralympic finals: Milano–Cortina 2026

David Chávez (born 2 March 1999) is a Salvadoran para cross-country skier who competes in the sitting classification LW10.5. He represented El Salvador at the 2026 Winter Paralympics, becoming one of the first athletes from the country to compete at a Winter Paralympic Games.

== Biography ==
Chávez was born on 2 March 1999 in San Salvador, El Salvador. His life changed on 7 January 2015 when he was shot in the spine during an attempted robbery by gang members, leaving him paralyzed. After spending weeks in hospital and undergoing rehabilitation, he began adapting to life using his upper body and eventually became involved in sport as part of his recovery.

During rehabilitation Chávez joined a youth wheelchair basketball team, where he met fellow athlete Jonathan Arias. He later expanded into several adaptive sports including wheelchair basketball, para athletics, para surfing and para climbing before eventually taking up Para cross-country skiing.

Chávez began competing in Para cross-country skiing in 2023 as part of a programme supported by the nonprofit organisation OneTeam El Salvador. Alongside teammate Jonathan Arias, he took part in his first Para Nordic Skiing competition at the Continental Cup in Gålå, Norway, where Chávez placed 20th in the 1.2 km sprint event despite it being only his fifth day on snow.

Much of Chávez’s training takes place in El Salvador, where he practices on the beach at Playa El Cocal using a sit-ski on sand. The resistance created by wet sand makes the sessions physically demanding and serves as a form of strength training, helping him build the technique and endurance required for international competition.

In 2026 Chávez qualified for the 2026 Winter Paralympics in Milan and Cortina d'Ampezzo, becoming one of the first athletes to represent El Salvador at a Winter Olympic or Paralympic Games. At the Games he was the Salvadoran flagbearer for the 2026 Winter Paralympics opening ceremony. He competed in the men's sprint sitting and men's 10 km interval start sitting events in Para cross-country skiing.
