= Maximilien Seegers =

Belgian para-alpine skier (born 1991)

Personal information
- Born: 8 August 1991 (age 35) Belgium

Sport
- Country: Belgium
- Sport: Para-alpine skiing
- Disability class: AS2
- Events: Downhill, Super-G, Giant slalom, Slalom, Alpine combined

Achievements and titles
- Paralympic finals: Milan-Cortina 2026

Maximilien Seegers (born 8 August 1991) is a Belgian para-alpine skier who competes in the visually impaired classification. He represented Belgium at the 2026 Winter Paralympics, competing with guide Jérémy Mestdagh. He was also the Belgian flagbearer for the 2026 Winter Paralympics opening ceremony.

== Biography ==
=== Early life ===
Seegers was born in Belgium and grew up in Schaerbeek, a municipality of Brussels. He has a visual impairment caused by a genetic condition that gradually reduced his eyesight.

His passion for skiing began during childhood holidays in the mountains with his parents. During his studies he temporarily stopped skiing and instead played sports such as hockey and football. When his eyesight deteriorated further due to his genetic condition, he later returned to skiing and began competing in para-alpine skiing together with guide Jérémy Mestdagh.

=== Career ===
Because of his visual impairment, Seegers competes with a guide who skis ahead of him and provides instructions through microphones in their helmets. Mestdagh, who is also a close friend, warns him about obstacles and course changes during races. He trains in Peer or Landgraaf and occasionally in France.

Seegers combines competitive para-alpine skiing with a full-time job and is not a professional athlete. He works at a Decathlon store in Evere while training and competing during his free time, often using most of his annual leave for ski training and competitions.

At the World Para Alpine Skiing Championships in Maribor, Slovenia, in 2025, Seegers finished eighth in the slalom and eleventh in the giant slalom in the visually impaired category.

In February 2026 he was selected as part of the three-member Belgian para-alpine skiing team for the 2026 Winter Paralympics in Cortina d'Ampezzo, alongside Marte Goossen and Jérémie Prégardien. Seegers competed with Mestdagh in the visually impaired events including downhill, super-G, alpine combined, giant slalom and slalom.

Shortly before the Games, Seegers was named the Belgian flagbearer for the 2026 Winter Paralympics opening ceremony. Due to logistical reasons the Belgian delegation did not attend the ceremony in person, and Seegers carried the flag symbolically through a recorded video message.

Seegers made his Paralympic debut at the 2026 Winter Paralympics in Cortina d'Ampezzo. In his first race, the men's downhill, he did not finish after falling midway through the course. He recovered to achieve top ten results in several events during the Games. During the Games he finished ninth in the super-G and tenth in the alpine combined, giant slalom and slalom events in the visually impaired category, completing his Paralympic debut with multiple top ten finishes.

== Results ==
=== Paralympic Games ===
Year	Venue	Results
2026	Italy Cortina d'Ampezzo	9th Super-G VI; 10th Alpine combined VI; 10th Giant slalom VI; 10th Slalom VI; DNF Downhill VI

=== World Championships ===
Year	Venue	Results
2025	Slovenia Maribor	8th Slalom VI; 11th Giant slalom VI
