= Belgium at the 1992 Winter Paralympics =

- IPC code: BEL
- NPC: Belgian Paralympic Committee
- Website: www.paralympic.be

in Tignes-Albertville
- Competitors: 3
- Medals: Gold 0 Silver 0 Bronze 0 Total 0

Winter Paralympics appearances (overview)
- 1976; 1980; 1984; 1988; 1992; 1994; 1998–2002; 2006; 2010; 2014; 2018; 2022; 2026

Belgium competed at the 1992 Winter Paralympics in Tignes/Albertville, France. Three competitors from Belgium participated, but did not win any medals.

== See also ==
- Belgium at the Paralympics
- Belgium at the 1992 Winter Olympics
