= Belgium at the 2014 Winter Paralympics =

- IPC code: BEL
- NPC: Belgian Paralympic Committee
- Website: www.paralympic.be

in Sochi
- Competitors: 2 in 1 sport
- Medals: Gold 0 Silver 0 Bronze 0 Total 0

Winter Paralympics appearances (overview)
- 1976; 1980; 1984; 1988; 1992; 1994; 1998–2002; 2006; 2010; 2014; 2018; 2022; 2026

Belgium sent a delegation to compete at the 2014 Winter Paralympics in Sochi, Russia, held between 7–16 March 2014. This was Belgium's eighth time participating in the Winter Paralympic Games. The Belgian delegation consisted of two athletes, Jasper Balcaen in alpine skiing, and Denis Colle, a snowboarder, which was considered a discipline of alpine skiing for these Paralympics. Their best performance in any event was 6th by Colle in the snowboard cross.

== Background ==
Belgium has competed at every Summer Paralympics, and most of the Winter Paralympic Games. After participating at the inaugural 1976 Winter Paralympics. The Belgians did not participate in the 1980, 1998, or 2002 editions, but have sent a delegation to every other Winter Paralympics. Their only medal at the Winter Paralympics coming into Sochi was a bronze in alpine skiing at the 1994 Winter Paralympics. The Belgian delegation consisted of two athletes, Jasper Balcaen in alpine skiing, and Denis Colle, a snowboarder. Colle was chosen as the flag bearer for the parade of nations during the opening ceremony, and for the closing ceremony.

== Disability classification ==
Every participant at the Paralympics has their disability grouped into one of five disability categories; amputation, the condition may be congenital or sustained through injury or illness; cerebral palsy; wheelchair athletes, there is often overlap between this and other categories; visual impairment, including blindness; or Les autres. Les autres includes any physical disability that does not fall strictly under one of the other categories, for example dwarfism or multiple sclerosis. Each Paralympic sport then has its own classifications, dependent upon the specific physical demands of competition. Events are given a code, made of numbers and letters, describing the type of event and classification of the athletes competing. Events with "B" in the code are for athletes with visual impairment, codes LW1 to LW9 are for athletes who stand to compete and LW10 to LW12 are for athletes who compete sitting down. Alpine skiing events grouped athletes into separate competitions for sitting, standing and visually impaired athletes.

== Alpine skiing ==
Jasper Balcaen was 21 years old at the time of these Paralympics. He was classified LW9-1, meaning he competes in a standing position, and he suffers from impairment in both his arms and legs. On 13 March he competed in the standing slalom, posting run times of 1 minute and 5 seconds and 1 minute and 8 seconds. His combined time of 2 minutes and 13 seconds saw him finish in 29th place, and he was nearly 35 seconds behind the gold medal-winning time, set by Alexey Bugaev of Russia. Two days later, he participated in the standing giant slalom, where he posted run times of 1 minute and 29 seconds and 1 minute and 23 seconds, for a total time of 2 minutes and 52 seconds. He finished in 23rd place, 27 seconds behind the gold medallist, Vincent Gauthier-Manuel of France.

| Athlete | Event | Run 1 | | | Run 2 | | | Final/Total | | |
| Athlete | Event | Time | Diff | Rank | Time | Diff | Rank | Time | Diff | Rank |
|---|---|---|---|---|---|---|---|---|---|---|
| Jasper Balcaen | Slalom, standing | 1:05.72 | +18.03 | 36 | 1:08.10 | +16.82 | 27 | 2:13.82 | +34.85 | 29 |
| Jasper Balcaen | Giant slalom, standing | 1:29.13 | +14.41 | 27 | 1:23.74 | +12.59 | 23 | 2:52.87 | +27.00 | 23 |

=== Snowboarding ===
For the 2014 Winter Paralympics, snowboard cross was considered a discipline of alpine skiing, rather than a separate sport. Snowboarding was offered only for athletes who competed in a standing position. The men's snowboard cross event was held on 14 March 2014. While each athlete made three attempts, only the two best times of each athlete counted towards the final result. Denis Colle, who acquired his disability through an accident, was 25 years old at the time of the Sochi Paralympics. He completed his first two runs in 55.83 and 54.49 seconds, however, he missed a gate in his third attempt. His combined time of his first two runs of 1 minute and 50 seconds put him in 6th place overall for the competition.

| Athlete | Event | Race 1 | | Race 2 | | Race 3 | | Total | |
| Athlete | Event | Time | Rank | Time | Rank | Time | Rank | Time | Rank |
|---|---|---|---|---|---|---|---|---|---|
| Denis Colle | Snowboard cross | 55.83 | 5 | 54.49 | 5 | DNF | | 1:50.32 | 6 |

== See also ==
- Belgium at the Paralympics
- Belgium at the 2014 Winter Olympics
