= 2026 Winter Paralympics closing ceremony =

- Part of 2026 Winter Paralympics
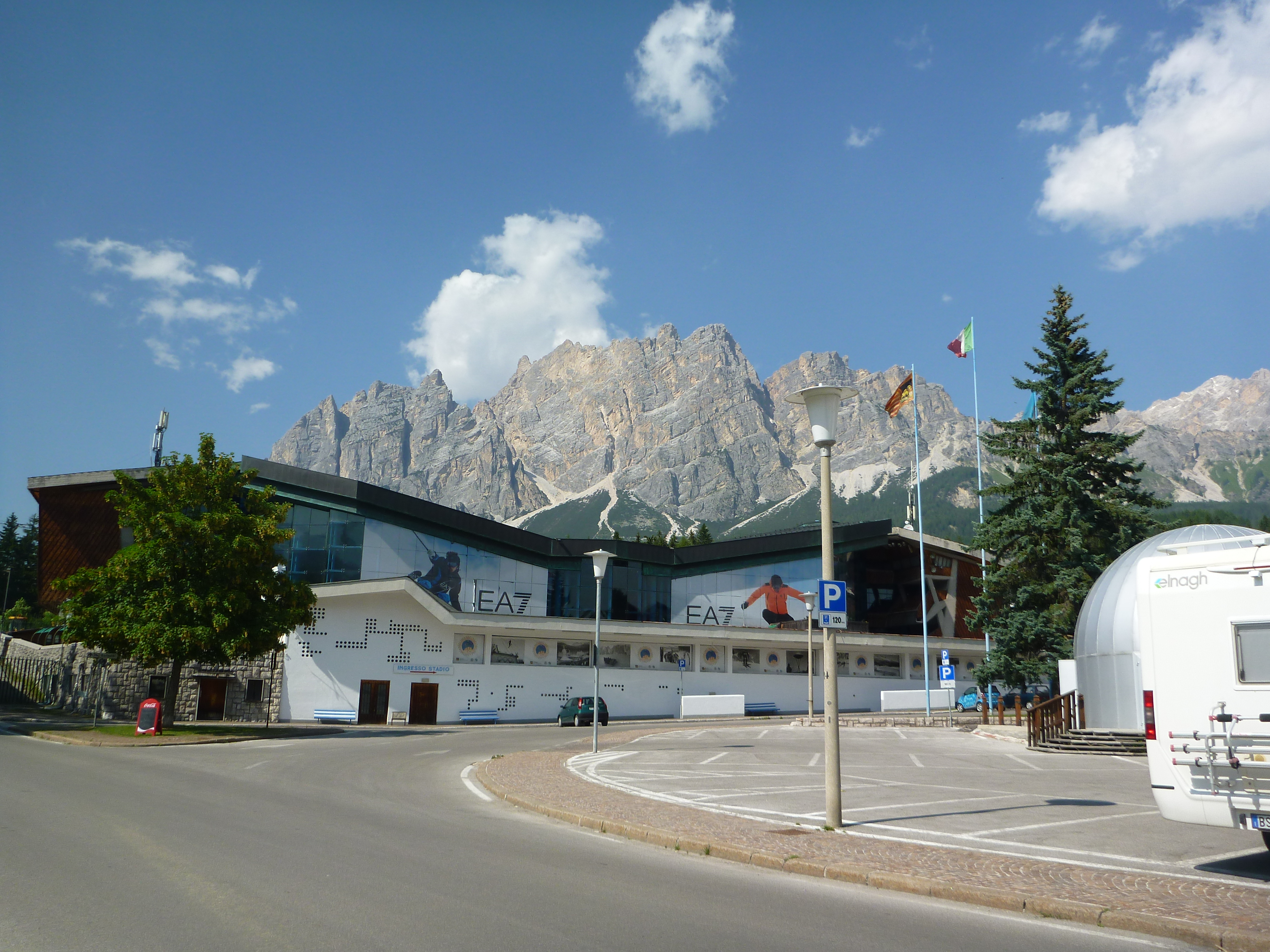
- Stadio olimpico del ghiaccio in Cortina d'Ampezzo, Italy, hosted the closing ceremony
- Date: 15 March 2026; 7 months ago
- Time: 20:30–23:00 CET
- Venue: Stadio olimpico del ghiaccio
- Location: Cortina d'Ampezzo, Italy
- Also known as: Italian Souvenir
- Filmed by: Olympic Broadcasting Services (OBS)
- Footage: The ceremony on the IPC YouTube channel on YouTube

The closing ceremony of the 2026 Winter Paralympics took place on 15 March 2026. Entitled "Italian Souvenir", the ceremony was held in the Stadio olimpico del ghiaccio (named Cortina Curling Olympic Stadium during the Games). The city of Cortina d'Ampezzo was chosen to host the ceremony, which previously did so during the 1956 Winter Olympics.

== Preparations ==
The ceremony was led by artistic director Angelo Bonello and was produced by G2 Eventi – Casta Diva Group. The theme of the ceremony was "Italian Souvenir", following the dream-like journey of Sofia Tansella, a young Italian girl with spinal muscular atrophy. The ceremony was described as a postcard of memories, highlighting the sporting success and the beauty of the Italian mountainous regions of Milan and Cortina d'Ampezzo. The Cortina Curling Olympic Stadium was transformed for the event, with a stage built on its curling sheets. Several nations, led by Ukraine, boycotted the ceremony due to the participation of Russian and Belarusian athletes at the Games.

== Proceedings ==
The ceremony took place indoors at Stadio olimpico del ghiaccio from 20:30-23:00 CET. The theme of the ceremony was "Italian Souvenir", following the dream-like journey of Sofia Tansella, a young Italian girl with spinal muscular atrophy. The ceremony was described as a postcard of memories, highlighting the sporting success and the beauty of the Italian mountainous regions of Milan and Cortina d'Ampezzo. Beginning with a short video, an artistic dance performance featuring Cirque du Soleil's Dergin Tokmak culminated with dancers forming the Paralympic agitos. The dancers continued with a brief performance highlighting teamwork and sportsmanship, ending by forming the Italian flag with luminous ropes. The flag of Italy was carried into the arena by retired Paralympians, including Josh Dueck. "Il Canto degli Italiani" was performed by Italian singer Arisa and the flag was raised by the Polizia di Stato.

During the athletes' parade, Tina and Milo entered the arena, accompanied by the music of Gabriele Capponi, an Italian DJ and activist. This was followed by a recognition of the newly-elected members of the IPC athletes' council and a celebration of the Games' volunteers. A performance featuring cellist Formisanoff ensued, which featured dancers who ended with an appreciation of Cortina d'Ampezzo. Afterwards, "Hymne de l'Avenir" was played during the lowering of the Paralympic flag; it was then officially handed over to representatives from the regions of Auvergne-Rhône-Alpes and Provence-Alpes-Côte d'Azur in France, which will host the 2030 Winter Paralympics in the French Alps. A presentation video was also shown after the raising of the flag of France and a unique rendition of "La Marseillaise". Official speeches from Fondazione Milano Cortina 2026 president Giovanni Malagò and International Paralympic Committee president Andrew Parsons followed, with Parsons declaring the Games closed.

Another performance saw dancers performing around a snow globe, which depicted iconic sites in both Milan and Cortina d'Ampezzo. The performance concluded with the simultaneous extinguishing of the Paralympic cauldrons in both Milan's Arco della Pace and Cortina d'Ampezzo's Piazza Angelo Dibona. The ceremony ended with a performance by Italian electronic group Planet Funk, who performed songs including "Chase the Sun", and a short video featuring Sofia that highlighted the athletes of the Games.

== Dignitaries in attendance ==
=== International Paralympic Committee ===
- International Paralympic Committee⁣ – ⁣Andrew Parsons, President of the International Paralympic Committee

Members of the International Paralympic Committee and the Paralympic movement, not counting foreign representatives

=== Host ===
- Italy –
  - Anna Scavuzzo, Vice Mayor of Milan
  - Gianluca Lorenzi, Mayor of Cortina d'Ampezzo
  - Giovanni Malagò, President of the Milano Cortina Organising Committee for the 2026 Olympic and Paralympic Winter Games

=== International ===
- France –
  - Renaud Muselier, President of the Provence-Alpes-Côte d'Azur Region
  - Fabrice Pannekoucke, President of the Auvergne-Rhone-Alpes Region

== See also ==
- 2026 Winter Olympics closing ceremony
- 2026 Winter Paralympics torch relay
