= Belgium at the 2018 Winter Paralympics =

- Flag of Belgium
- IPC code: BEL
- NPC: Belgian Paralympic Committee
- Website: www.paralympic.be/nl

in Pyeongchang, South Korea 9-18 March 2018
- Competitors: 2 in 1 sport
- Medals: Gold 0 Silver 0 Bronze 1 Total 1

Winter Paralympics appearances (overview)
- 1976; 1980; 1984; 1988; 1992; 1994; 1998–2002; 2006; 2010; 2014; 2018; 2022; 2026

Belgium competed at the 2018 Winter Paralympics in PyeongChang, South Korea, held from 9 to 18 March 2018.

== Administration ==
Olek Kazimirowski served as Chef de Mission.

== Medalists ==
Medal	Name	Sport	Event	Date
Bronze	Eléonor Sana; Guide: Chloé Sana	Alpine skiing	Women's downhill, visually impaired	10 March

== Team members ==
Two Belgian athletes are selected for the 2018 Games.

=== Alpine skiing ===
Men

Athlete	Event	Run 1			Run 2			Final/Total		
Athlete	Event	Time	Diff	Rank	Time	Diff	Rank	Time	Diff	Rank
Jasper Balcaen	Slalom	—N/a						1:53.94	+17.83	15
Jasper Balcaen	Giant slalom									

- Jasper Balcaen (classification: LW9-1; already competed at the 2014 Winter Paralympics)

Women

Athlete	Event	Run 1			Run 2			Run 3			Total		
Athlete	Event	Time	Diff	Rank	Time	Diff	Rank	Time	Diff	Rank	Time	Diff	Rank
Eléonor Sana	Downhill, visually impaired	1:36.96	+5.46	4	—N/a						1:31.60	+1.88	3rd place, bronze medalist(s)
Eléonor Sana	Super-G, visually impaired	—N/a									1:36.00	+5.83	4

- Eléonor Sana (classification: B2; debut; guided by her sister Chloé Sana)

== See also ==
- Belgium at the 2018 Winter Olympics
