= Belgium at the 2006 Winter Paralympics =

- IPC code: BEL
- NPC: Belgian Paralympic Committee
- Website: www.paralympic.be

in Turin
- Competitors: 1 (0 men and 1 woman) in 1 sport
- Medals Ranked 20th: Gold 0 Silver 0 Bronze 0 Total 0

Winter Paralympics appearances (overview)
- 1976; 1980; 1984; 1988; 1992; 1994; 1998–2002; 2006; 2010; 2014; 2018; 2022; 2026

Belgium participated in the ninth Winter Paralympics in Turin, Italy.

Belgium entered one athlete in the following sport:

- Alpine skiing: 1 female

== Medalists ==
	(gold)	(silver)	(bronze)	Total
Belgium	0	0	0	0

== See also ==
- 2006 Winter Paralympics
- Belgium at the 2006 Winter Olympics
