= Belgium at the 1988 Winter Paralympics =

- IPC code: BEL
- NPC: Belgian Paralympic Committee
- Website: www.paralympic.be

in Innsbruck, Austria
- Competitors: 2 (2 men and 0 women) in 1 sport and 4 events
- Medals Ranked 16th: Gold 0 Silver 0 Bronze 0 Total 0

Winter Paralympics appearances (overview)
- 1976; 1980; 1984; 1988; 1992; 1994; 1998–2002; 2006; 2010; 2014; 2018; 2022; 2026

Belgium competed at the 1988 Winter Paralympics in Innsbruck, Austria. Two competitors from Belgium won zero medals and finished 16th in the medal table.

Both competitors competed in alpine skiing.

== Alpine skiing ==
Pierre de Coster competed in the Downhill B2 and Giant Slalom B2 events and Willy Mercier competed in the Downhill B1 and Giant Slalom B1 events.

== See also ==
- Belgium at the Paralympics
- Belgium at the 1988 Winter Olympics
