= Belgium at the 2022 Winter Paralympics =

- Flag of Belgium
- IPC code: BEL
- NPC: Belgian Paralympic Committee
- Website: www.paralympic.be/nl

in Beijing, China 4 March 2022 – 13 March 2022
- Competitors: 2 (on foot) in 1 sport
- Flag bearer (opening): Rémi Mazi
- Flag bearer (closing): Linda Le Bon
- Medals: Gold 0 Silver 0 Bronze 0 Total 0

Winter Paralympics appearances (overview)
- 1976; 1980; 1984; 1988; 1992; 1994; 1998–2002; 2006; 2010; 2014; 2018; 2022; 2026

Belgium competed at the 2022 Winter Paralympics in Beijing, China which took place between 4–13 March 2022. Two alpine skiers competed.

== Administration ==
Olek Kazimirowski served as Chef de Mission. He also served in this role for the Belgian delegation at the 2016 Summer Paralympics in Rio de Janeiro, Brazil, the 2018 Winter Paralympics in Pyeongchang, South Korea and the 2020 Summer Paralympics in Tokyo, Japan. Alpine skier Rémi Mazi was the flag bearer during the opening ceremony. Alpine skier Linda Le Bon was not able to attend the opening ceremony as her competitions began a day later. Le Bon was the flag bearer during the closing ceremony.

== Competitors ==
The following is the list of number of competitors participating at the Games per sport/discipline.

Sport	Men	Women	Total
Alpine skiing	1	1	1
Total	1	1	2

== Alpine skiing ==
Linda Le Bon (and her sighted guide and daughter Ulla Gilot) and Rémi Mazi competed at the 2022 Winter Paralympics. Pierre Couquelet was originally scheduled to be Linda Le Bon's sighted guide. Couquelet was not able to compete as her guide after failing a doping test due to an administrative error related to medication that he takes.

Athlete	Event	Run 1		Run 2		Total	
Athlete	Event	Time	Rank	Time	Rank	Time	Rank
Rémi Mazi	Men's giant slalom, standing	1:11.16	32	1:10.01	32	2:21.17	32
Rémi Mazi	Men's slalom, standing	56.13	32	1:01.75	25	1:57.88	23
Linda Le Bon; Guide: Ulla Gilot	Women's super combined, visually impaired	1:26.36	6	51.48	5	2:18.20	5
Linda Le Bon; Guide: Ulla Gilot	Women's downhill, visually impaired	—N/a				1:36.06	6
Linda Le Bon; Guide: Ulla Gilot	Women's giant slalom, visually impaired	1:08.56	12	1:10.07	12	2:18.63	12
Linda Le Bon; Guide: Ulla Gilot	Women's slalom, visually impaired	56.11	13	53.99	10	1:50.10	11
Linda Le Bon; Guide: Ulla Gilot	Women's super-G, visually impaired	—N/a				1:26.98	7

== See also ==
- Belgium at the Paralympics
- Belgium at the 2022 Winter Olympics
