= Israel at the 2022 Winter Paralympics =

- Flag of Israel
- IPC code: ISR
- NPC: Israel Paralympic Committee
- Website: www.isad.org.il

in Beijing, China 4 March 2022 – 13 March 2022
- Competitors: 1 (1 woman) in 1 sport
- Flag bearer: Inbal Pezaro
- Medals: Gold 0 Silver 0 Bronze 0 Total 0

Winter Paralympics appearances (overview)
- 2022; 2026

Israel competed at the 2022 Winter Paralympics in Beijing, China which took place between 4–13 March 2022. It was the first time Israel competed at the Winter Paralympics.

== Administration ==
Former Paralympic swimmer Inbal Pezaro served as Chef de Mission.

== Competitors ==
The following is the list of number of competitors participating at the Games per sport/discipline.

Sport	Men	Women	Total
Alpine skiing	0	1	1
Total	0	1	1

== Alpine skiing ==
Sheina Vaspi competed in alpine skiing at the 2022 Winter Paralympics. She was not able to compete in the women's slalom standing event after a change in schedule caused a conflict with Shabbat.

Athlete	Event	Class	Run 1		Run 2		Total	
Athlete	Event	Class	Time	Rank	Time	Rank	Time	Rank
Sheina Vaspi	Women's giant slalom	LW2	1:18.87	19	1:22.31	15	2:41.18	15

== See also ==
- Israel at the Paralympics
- Israel at the 2022 Winter Olympics
