= Belgium at the 1976 Winter Paralympics =

- IPC code: BEL
- NPC: Belgian Paralympic Committee
- Website: www.paralympic.be

in Örnsköldsvik, Sweden
- Competitors: 5 (5 men and 0 women) in 1 sport and 3 events
- Medals Ranked 10th: Gold 0 Silver 0 Bronze 0 Total 0

Winter Paralympics appearances (overview)
- 1976; 1980; 1984; 1988; 1992; 1994; 1998–2002; 2006; 2010; 2014; 2018; 2022; 2026

Belgium competed at the 1976 Winter Paralympics in Örnsköldsvik, Sweden. 5 competitors from Belgium won 0 medals and finished 10th in the medal table.

== Cross-country ==
The following five athletes competed in cross-country events:

- Roger Hendrickx
- Remi Standaert
- Andre van der Bussche
- Julien van Herreweghe
- Lucien van Rennebog

They competed in the following three events:

- Men's Short Distance 10 km A
- Men's Short Distance 10 km B
- Men's 3x10 km Relay A-B

== See also ==
- Belgium at the Paralympics
- Belgium at the 1976 Winter Olympics
