= Israel at the 2026 Winter Paralympics =

- Flag of Israel
- IPC code: ISR
- NPC: Israel Paralympic Committee

in Milan & Cortina d'Ampezzo, Italy 6 March 2026 – 15 March 2026
- Competitors: 1 (1 woman) in 1 sport and 3 events
- Medals: Gold 0 Silver 0 Bronze 0 Total 0

Winter Paralympics appearances (overview)
- 2022; 2026

Israel is competing at the 2026 Winter Paralympics in Milan & Cortina d'Ampezzo, Italy, which take place between 6–15 March 2026. The only competing athlete is Sheina Vaspi.

== Competitors ==
The following is the list of number of competitors participating at the Games per sport/discipline.

Sport	Men	Women	Total
Para alpine skiing	0	1	1
Total	0	1	1

== Para alpine skiing ==
Athlete	Class	Event	Run 1		Run 2		Total	
Athlete	Class	Event	Time	Rank	Time	Rank	Time	Rank
Sheina Vaspi	LW2	Women's downhill, standing	—N/a				DNS	
Sheina Vaspi	LW2	Women's super-G, standing	—N/a				DNF	
Sheina Vaspi	LW2	Women's super combined, standing	1:28.31	11	57.97	13	2:26.28	12

== See also ==
- Israel at the Paralympics
- Israel at the 2026 Winter Olympics
