= Belgium at the 2010 Winter Paralympics =

- IPC code: BEL
- NPC: Belgian Paralympic Committee
- Website: www.paralympic.be

in Vancouver
- Competitors: 1 in 1 sport
- Flag bearer: Natasha de Troyer
- Medals: Gold 0 Silver 0 Bronze 0 Total 0

Winter Paralympics appearances (overview)
- 1976; 1980; 1984; 1988; 1992; 1994; 1998–2002; 2006; 2010; 2014; 2018; 2022; 2026

Belgium sent a delegation to compete at the 2010 Winter Paralympics in Vancouver, British Columbia, Canada from 12–21 March 2010. The country was represented by a single athlete, visually impaired Natasha de Troyer, who competed in five events in alpine skiing.

== Alpine skiing ==
Natasha de Troyer was her country's sole representative, skiing with her guide Diego Van de Voorde. She has said that she is aiming for three medals. She competed in all five events in alpine skiing: downhill, super-G, giant slalom, slalom and super combined.

| Athlete | Event | Final | | | |
| Athlete | Event | Run 1 | Run 2 | Total Time | Rank |
|---|---|---|---|---|---|
| Natasha de Troyer | Downhill visually impaired | | | 1:48.85 | 8 |
| Natasha de Troyer | Slalom visually impaired | 1.04.27 | 1.13.92 | 2.18.19 | 7 |
| Natasha de Troyer | Giant slalom visually impaired | DNF | did not advance | | – |
| Natasha de Troyer | Super-G visually impaired | | | 1:44.03 | 5 |
| Natasha de Troyer | Super combined visually impaired | 1:48.87 | 1:04.58 | 2:53.45 | 5 |

== See also ==
- Belgium at the Paralympics
- Belgium at the 2010 Winter Olympics
