= We Are Together. Sports =

International multi-sport tournament

Winter Paralympic Games "We Are Together. Sports" 2022
- Host city: Khanty-Mansiysk
- Organizer: Russia
- Nations: 5
- Events: 5
- Opening: 18 March 2022
- Closing: 21 March 2022

The Winter Paralympic Games "We Are Together. Sports" (Russian: Зимние Игры Паралимпийцев «Мы Вместе. Спорт», romanized: Zimnie Igry Paralimpiytsev «My Vmeste. Sport») was an international multi-sport tournament organized by the Russian Paralympic Committee. It was held from 18 to 21 March 2022 in Khanty-Mansiysk, Russia.

The games were organized after Russia and Belarus were banned from the National Paralympic Committee-sanctioned 2022 Winter Paralympics in Beijing. The ban was a response to the 2022 Russian invasion of Ukraine.

== The Games ==
=== Participating nations ===
Five nations including the hosts Russia took part in the Games.

- Armenia
- Belarus (16)
- Kazakhstan
- Russia (Host)
- Tajikistan

=== Sports ===
Winter Paralympic Games, "We are together. Sport" featured six sports.

- Alpine skiing
- Biathlon
- Cross-country skiing
- Ice hockey
- Snowboarding
- Wheelchair curling

== Medal table ==
Russia dominated the event, topping the medal tally.

* Host nation (Russia)

Rank	Nation	Gold	Silver	Bronze	Total
1	Russia*	39	40	27	106
2	Belarus	5	2	9	16
3	Armenia	1	0	0	1
4	Kazakhstan	0	0	1	1
Totals (4 entries)		45	42	37	124

== See also ==
- 2022 boycott of Russia and Belarus
- Friendship Games
