= Audrey Pascual =

Spanish Para alpine skier (born 2004)

Personal information
- Full name: Audrey Pascual Seco
- Born: 15 October 2004 (age 21) Madrid, Spain

Sport
- Country: Spain
- Sport: Para alpine skiing
- Disability: Agenesis
- Disability class: LW12-2
Medal record
Women's Para alpine skiing
Representing Spain
Paralympic Games
Gold medal – first place	2026 Milano Cortina	Super-G sitting
Gold medal – first place	2026 Milano Cortina	Super combined sitting
Silver medal – second place	2026 Milano Cortina	Downhill sitting
Bronze medal – third place	2026 Milano Cortina	Slalom sitting
World Championships
Silver medal – second place	2023 Lleida	Slalom sitting
Silver medal – second place	2025 Maribor	Slalom sitting
World University Games
Gold medal – first place	2025 Turin	Super-G sitting
Silver medal – second place	2025 Turin	Giant slalom sitting

Audrey Pascual Seco (born 15 October 2004) is a Spanish Para alpine skier.

== Career ==
In January 2025, Pascual competed at the 2025 Winter World University Games in para-alpine skiing and won a gold medal in the Super-G with a time of 1:15.87. She also won a silver medal in the giant slalom sitting events. The next month he competed at the 2025 World Para Alpine Skiing Championships and won a silver medal in the slalom sitting event.

During the 2025–26 FIS Para Alpine Ski World Cup, she won the downhill, Super-G and giant slalom crystal globes. She finished 20 points behind Germany's Anna-Lena Forster for the overall crystal globe.

In February 2026, she was selected to represent Spain at the 2026 Winter Paralympics, where she served as the team's flag bearer during the 2026 Winter Paralympics Parade of Nations. She won a gold medal in the super-G sitting event with a time of 1:17.82. This was the first Winter Paralympic Games gold medal for Spain since 2014, and the first by a woman since 1998. She also won a silver medal in the downhill sitting event with a time of 1:25.84. One more gold in Super combined sitting and a bronze in slalom sitting made her the most laureated Spanish winter paralympic athlete.

== Personal life ==
Pascual was born with bilateral tibial agenesis and had both legs amputated above the knee.

== World Cup results ==
=== Season standings ===
Season
Season	Age	Overall	Slalom	Giant slalom	Super-G	Downhill
2023	18	3	4	1	—	—
2024	19	2	2	4	—	—
2025	20	2	2	5	1	—
2026	21	2	3	1	1	1
