= Belgium at the 1994 Winter Paralympics =

- IPC code: BEL
- NPC: Belgian Paralympic Committee
- Website: www.paralympic.be

in Lillehammer
- Competitors: 2 in 1 sport
- Medals Ranked 22nd: Gold 0 Silver 0 Bronze 1 Total 1

Winter Paralympics appearances (overview)
- 1976; 1980; 1984; 1988; 1992; 1994; 1998–2002; 2006; 2010; 2014; 2018; 2022; 2026

Belgium participated in the 1994 Winter Paralympics in Lillehammer, Norway. The country sent two competitors (Harry Geyskens and Willy Mercier), both in alpine skiing. They entered a total of seven events between them.

The 1994 Games were the first Winter Paralympics at which Belgium earned a medal. In the men's Super-G (B1 category), Willy Mercier finished third with a real time of 4:29.09. This was well behind gold medallist David Sundstroem of Sweden (2:50.53) and silver medallist Vicente Garcia Salmeron of Spain (3:46.33), but as the five other competitors all failed to reach the finish line, Mercier's performance was sufficient for bronze.

In five of their six other events, Mercier and Geyskens either failed to reach the finish line, or finished last of those who crossed the line. The exception was in the men's Super-G (B3), where Geyskens' time of 1:55.67 placed him sixth of the seven athletes who completed the event, ahead of Japan's Toshimasa Onari (2:29.80).

Despite having won its first Winter Paralympic medal, Belgium was absent from the next two Games, making its return in 2006.

== See also ==
- Belgium at the 1994 Winter Olympics
