= Belgium at the 1984 Winter Paralympics =

- IPC code: BEL
- NPC: Belgian Paralympic Committee
- Website: www.paralympic.be

in Innsbruck
- Competitors: 3 in 2 sports
- Medals Ranked 15th: Gold 0 Silver 0 Bronze 0 Total 0

Winter Paralympics appearances (overview)
- 1976; 1980; 1984; 1988; 1992; 1994; 1998–2002; 2006; 2010; 2014; 2018; 2022; 2026

Belgium sent a delegation to compete at the 1984 Winter Paralympics, in Innsbruck, Austria.

Belgium did not win any medals.

== Classification ==
Each event had separate standing, sitting, or visually impaired classifications:

- LW2 - standing: single leg amputation above the knee
- LW 3 - standing: double leg amputation below the knee, mild cerebral palsy, or equivalent impairment
- LW4 - standing: single leg amputation below the knee
- LW5/7 - standing: double arm amputation
- LW6/8 - standing: single arm amputation
- LW9 - standing: amputation or equivalent impairment of one arm and one leg
- B1 - visually impaired: no functional vision
- B2 - visually impaired: up to ca 3-5% functional vision

== Alpine skiing ==
Men

Athlete	Event	Run 1 (SG)			Run 2 (Sl)			Final/Total		
Athlete	Event	Time	Diff	Rank	Time	Diff	Rank	Time	Diff	Rank
Luc Kerremans	Giant slalom, LW2		+			+			+	
Luc Kerremans	Slalom, LW2		+			+			+	
Willy Mercier	Alpine Combination, B1		+			+			+	
Willy Mercier	Downhill, B1		+			+			+	
Willy Mercier	Giant slalom, B1		+			+			+	
Pierre de Coster	Downhill, B2		+			+			+	

== Cross-country skiing ==
Men

Athlete	Events	Class	Factor %	Qualification		Semifinal		Final	
Athlete	Events	Class	Factor %	Time	Rank	Time	Rank	Time	Rank
Pierre de Coster	10 km	B2							

== See also ==
- Belgium at the 1984 Winter Olympics
- Belgium at the Paralympics
