= Portugal at the 2026 Winter Paralympics =

- Flag of Portugal
- IPC code: POR
- NPC: Portuguese Paralympic Committee

in Milan & Cortina d'Ampezzo, Italy 6 March 2026 – 15 March 2026
- Competitors: 1 (1 man) in 1 sport
- Medals: Gold 0 Silver 0 Bronze 0 Total 0

Winter Paralympics appearances (overview)
- 1976; 1980; 1984; 1988; 1992; 1994; 1998; 2002; 2006; 2010; 2014; 2018; 2022; 2026

Portugal will compete at the 2026 Winter Paralympics in Milan & Cortina d'Ampezzo, Italy, which will take place between 6–15 March 2026.

== Competitors ==
The following is the list of number of competitors participating at the Games per sport/discipline.

Sport	Men	Women	Total
Para snowboard	1	0	1
Total	1	0	1

== Para snowboard ==
Banked slalom

Athlete	Event	Run 1	Run 2	Best	Rank
Diogo Carmona	Men's banked slalom, SB-LL2	1:16.58	1:07.52	1:07.52	18

== See also ==
- Portugal at the Paralympics
- Portugal at the 2026 Winter Olympics
