= Montenegro at the 2026 Winter Paralympics =

- Flag of Montenegro
- IPC code: MNE
- NPC: Paralympic Committee of Montenegro

in Milan & Cortina d'Ampezzo, Italy 6 March 2026 – 15 March 2026
- Competitors: 1 (1 man) in 1 sport
- Medals: Gold 0 Silver 0 Bronze 0 Total 0

Winter Paralympics appearances (overview)
- 2026

Montenegro will compete at the 2026 Winter Paralympics in Milan & Cortina d'Ampezzo, Italy, which will take place between 6–15 March 2026.

== Competitors ==
The following is the list of number of competitors participating at the Games per sport/discipline.

| Sport | Men | Women | Total |
|---|---|---|---|
| Para snowboard | 1 | 0 | 1 |
| Total | 1 | 0 | 1 |

== Para snowboard ==
Banked slalom

| Athlete | Event | Run 1 | Run 2 | Best | Rank |
|---|---|---|---|---|---|
| Andrej Šibalić | Men's banked slalom, SB-LL2 | 1:23.78 | 1:19.07 | 1:19.07 | 20 |

== See also ==
- Montenegro at the Paralympics
- Montenegro at the 2026 Winter Olympics
