= Valeriy Sushkevych =

Ukrainian politician

Valeriy Shushkevych
- Валерій Сушкевич
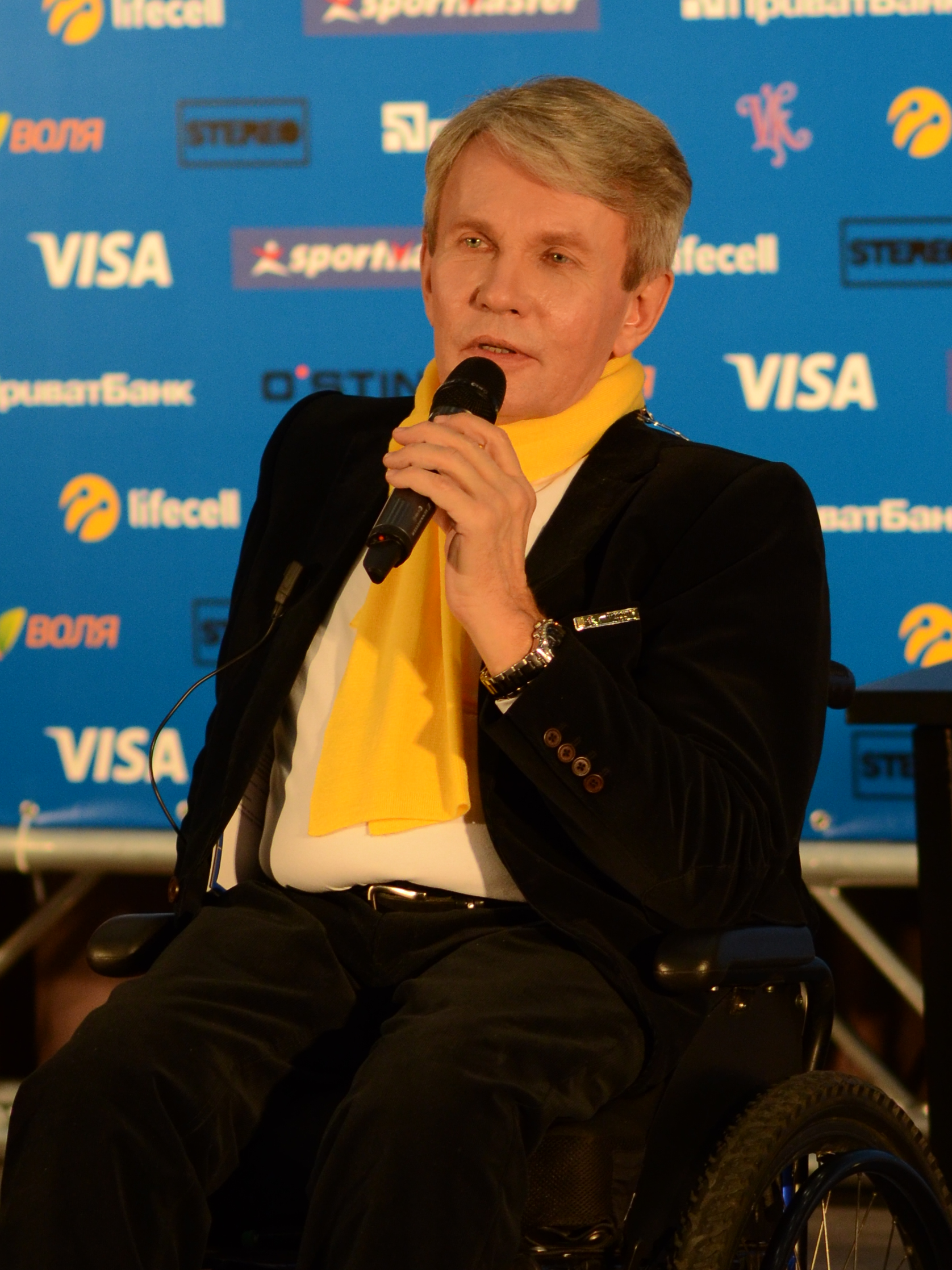
- Shushkevych in 2018

People's Deputy of Ukraine
- Incumbent
- Assumed office 29 March 1998

Personal details
- Born: 14 June 1954 (age 72) Tarashcha, Ukrainian SSR, Soviet Union (now Ukraine)
- Party: Batkivshchyna
- Other political affiliations: Hromada
- Education: Dnipropetrovsk State University

Valeriy Mykhailovych Sushkevych (Ukrainian: Вале́рій Миха́йлович Сушке́вич; born 14 June 1954) is a Ukrainian politician currently serving as a People's Deputy of Ukraine since 1998. He is president of the National Committee of Sports for the Disabled of Ukraine (National Paralympic Committee of Ukraine), head of the Ukrainian public socio-political association "National Assembly of Disabled of Ukraine", and president of the Association "Sports Industry of Ukraine."

Disabled from childhood, Shushkevych moves in a wheelchair.

== Biography ==
Born in Tarashcha in 1954, Sushkevych works and was educated in Dnipro. In 1976, Sushkevych graduated from the Oles Honchar Dnipro National University with a degree in mathematics and computer programming. He worked in this field in various factories until 1992, when he was switched his career to civil servant in the "Department of Social Protection of the Population" in the Dnipropetrovsk Oblast State Administration. He worked in this department until 1998.

Sushkevych was previously a member of the Dnipropetrovsk Oblast Council from 1990 to 1994.

In the 1998 Ukrainian parliamentary election, Sushkevych was elected for Hromada. In the 2002 Ukrainian parliamentary election for For United Ukraine!, although in parliament he joined the Yulia Tymoshenko Bloc faction. In the 2006 Ukrainian parliamentary election and 2007 Ukrainian parliamentary election Sushkevych was re-elected to parliament for the Yulia Tymoshenko Bloc. In the 2012 Ukrainian parliamentary election he was elected to parliament for Batkivshchyna.

Sushkevych was appointed Commissioner of the President of Ukraine for the Rights of Persons with Disabilities on 23 May 2019 by a decree of President Volodymyr Zelenskyy.
