= 2026 Winter Paralympics opening ceremony =

- Part of 2026 Winter Paralympics
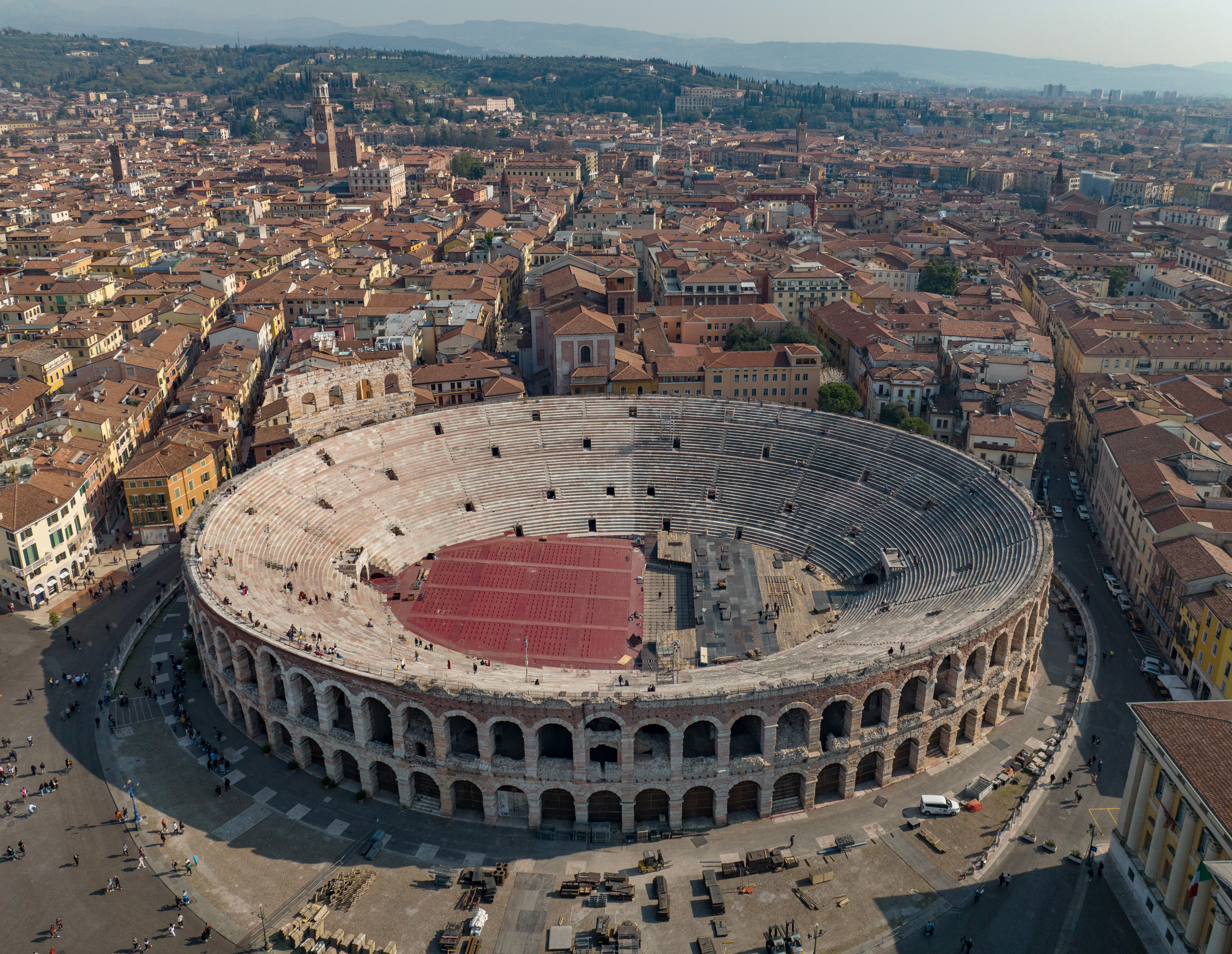
- Verona Arena in Verona, Italy, hosted the opening ceremony
- Date: 6 March 2026; 3 months ago
- Time: 20:00 CET
- Venue: Verona Arena (main); Teatro Filarmonico (secondary)
- Location: Verona, Italy
- Also known as: Life in Motion
- Filmed by: Olympic Broadcasting Services (OBS)
- Footage: The ceremony on the IPC YouTube channel on YouTube

The opening ceremony of the 2026 Winter Paralympics took place on 6 March 2026. Entitled "Life in Motion", the ceremony was held in the Verona Arena. The city of Verona was chosen to host the ceremony, even though no events were scheduled to take place there. The ancient Roman amphitheater, that regularly hosts a famous open-air opera festival as well as other cultural events, also hosted the closing ceremony of the 2026 Winter Olympics on 22 February. The Teatro Filarmonico, an opera theatre in Verona, served as a secondary venue.

== Preparations ==
The ceremony was produced by Filmmaster Group and led by artistic director Alfredo Accatino, who also oversaw the Winter Olympics' closing ceremony at Verona Arena.

Ahead of the Olympics and Paralympics, the Verona Arena underwent a refurbishment in order to modernize aspects of its facilities. Part of this work included temporary accessibility enhancements in order to accommodate the Paralympics, including adjustments to seating areas, and the inclusion of ramps and lifts. Organizing committee CEO Andrea Varnier stated that while some of these changes had been criticized for their modifications to the historic amphitheatre, "The decision to stage the opening ceremony in the [Verona Arena] is not just an aesthetic one although, of course, we like to showcase such a beauty. But it was also an idea, to make the arena accessible and not only the arena itself but the entire route from the railway station to the venue."

== Proceedings ==
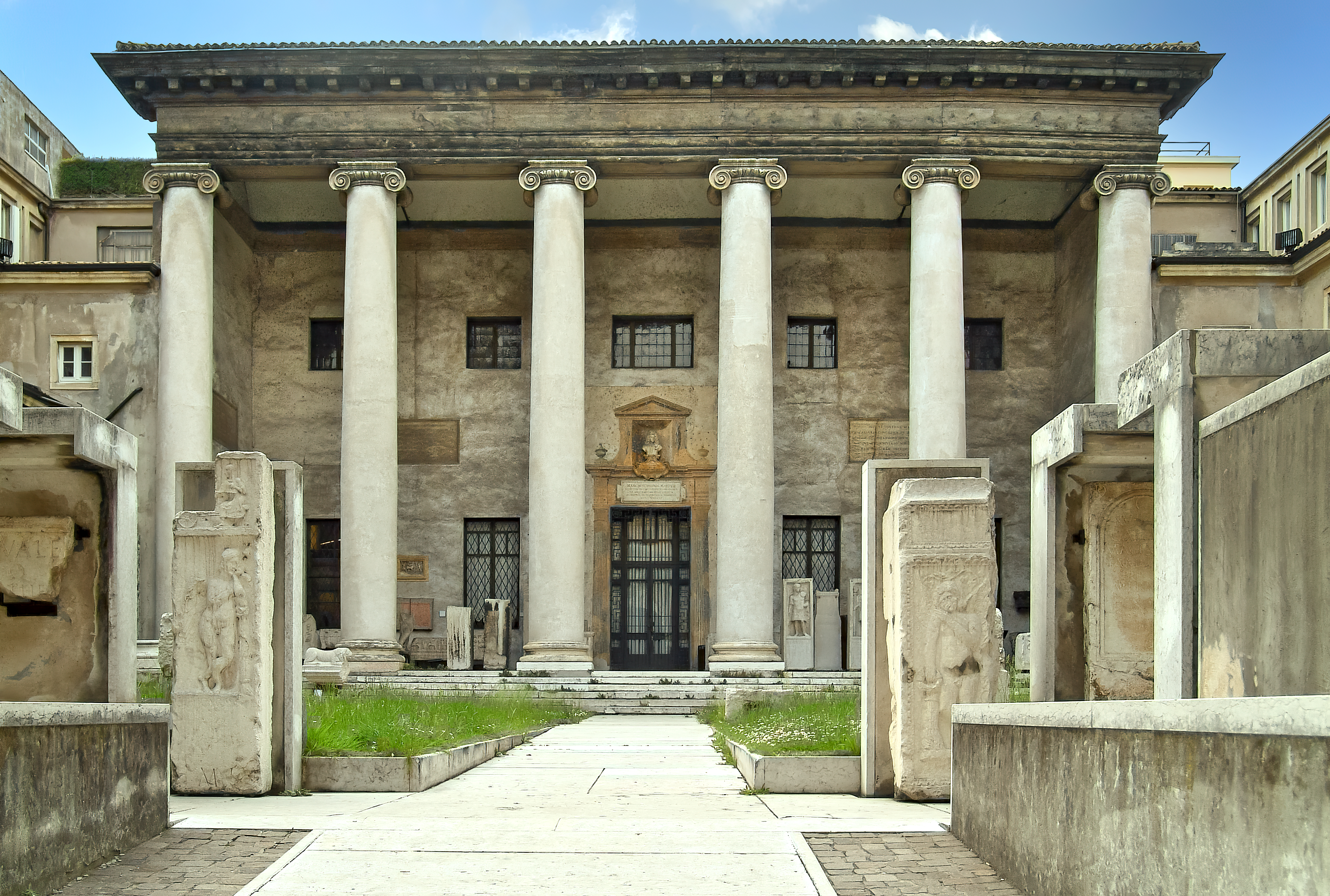
Exterior of the Teatro Filarmonico in Verona, Italy.

The opening ceremony was held at the Verona Arena, and started at 20:00 (CET) in Verona, Italy. It began with a short video titled "Vibes," which featured some athletes at the Games. A performance featuring drummers Elisa "Helly" Montin, Stewart Copeland, and Cornel Hrisca-Munn began, which played before a dance performance and a countdown featuring dancers. Another performance by artist and choreographer Chiara Bersani followed. Afterwards, model Carlotta Bertotti featured in a short segment about body positivity; Bertotti and Veronica Yoko Plebani brought the Flag of Italy into the arena, which was raised by the Carabinieri. "Il Canto degli Italiani" was performed by singers Mimì Caruso, Ginevra Nervi, and the Alpine choir from Verona.

A short video montage of prior Paralympic Games and the Paralympic torch relay followed, titled "Change Starts With Sport". The parade of nations began soon afterwards, which featured a DJ set from Italian producers Meduza. Only about 45 athletes were present at the ceremony, but the arena had a screen showing athletes at other venues, including Tesero. DJ Michele Specchiale, aka Miky Bionic, performed after the conclusion of the parade, which was then followed by the unveiling of the Paralympic Agitos by dancers. A brief video titled "spaces" introduced another artistic sequence, which began outside the arena at Piazza Bra. Italian musician and producer Dardust performed during an interpretive dance sequence that highlighted accessibility and inclusion. The ceremony then moved to the Teatro Filarmonico in Verona, which saw performances by cellist Valentina Irlando and deaf dancer Carmen Diodato.

The ceremony then returned to the Verona Arena, which saw the official speeches by International Paralympic Committee⁣ president ⁣Andrew Parsons and Milano Cortina Organising Committee for the 2026 Olympic and Paralympic Winter Games president Giovanni Malagò. Afterwards, Italian president Sergio Mattarella declared the Games open.

Verona, known as the City of Love, was highlighted through a video titled "Loves" and a dance by performers, including Italian wheelchair dancer Marco Galli. This was followed by the hoisting of the Paralympic flag, which was brought into the arena by retired Paralympic athletes from Italy including Christian Lanthaler, Silvia Parente, and Enzo Masiello; "Hymne de l’Avenir" and the Paralympic oaths were performed afterwards.

Italian Paralympian Beatrice Vio brought the flame into the arena, which was then followed by a dance performance which transformed the arena into a "giant Paralympic cauldron". In Milan, Italian Paralympian Gianmaria Dal Maistro lit the cauldron, while fellow Italian Paralympian Francesca Porcellato did the same in Cortina d'Ampezzo. Afterwards, astronaut Sophie Adenot and Michaela Benthaus, the first wheelchair user to travel to space, gave a short speech about human potential. The ceremony concluded with a new reinterpretation of the Italian song "Nel blu dipinto di blu" by Domenico Modugno, and a short performance by Italian rapper Capo Plaza.

=== Parade of Nations ===
Italian electronic trio Meduza performed during the parade. A number of delegations did not send their athletes to the opening ceremony; some of these absences were for logistical reasons due to the distance of Verona from the two main host cities (Verona is 250 kilometres (160 mi) from Cortina d'Ampezzo). A number of teams additionally boycotted the opening ceremony in protest of the IPC allowing Russian and Belarusian athletes to compete under their national flags, including Austria, Czechia, Estonia, Finland, Germany, Latvia, Lithuania, the Netherlands, Poland, and Ukraine. The European Commission also boycotted the ceremony. Organisers stated that all participating National Paralympic Committees (NPCs) would still be featured in the parade of nations regardless of athlete presence, with volunteer flag bearers and video packages being used to represent NPCs which could not attend.

A few hours before the opening ceremony started, Iran withdrew from the opening ceremony and Paralympics altogether, citing travel safety concerns for Aboulfazl Khatibi.

== Dignitaries in attendance ==
=== International Paralympic Committee ===
- International Paralympic Committee⁣ – ⁣Andrew Parsons, President of the International Paralympic Committee
- International Olympic Committee⁣ – ⁣Kirsty Coventry, President of the International Olympic Committee

Members of the International Paralympic Committee and the Paralympic movement, not counting foreign representatives

=== Host ===
- Italy – Sergio Mattarella, President of Italy
  - Giorgia Meloni, Prime Minister of Italy
  - Giovanni Malagò, President of the Milano Cortina Organising Committee for the 2026 Olympic and Paralympic Winter Games

=== International ===
- United States – Doug Collins, Secretary of Veterans Affairs (representing President Donald Trump, host country of the 2034 Winter Paralympics)
  - Scott Turner, Secretary of Housing and Urban Development

== See also ==
- 2026 Winter Olympics opening ceremony
- 2026 Winter Paralympics torch relay
