= Sheina Vaspi =

Israeli para-alpine skier

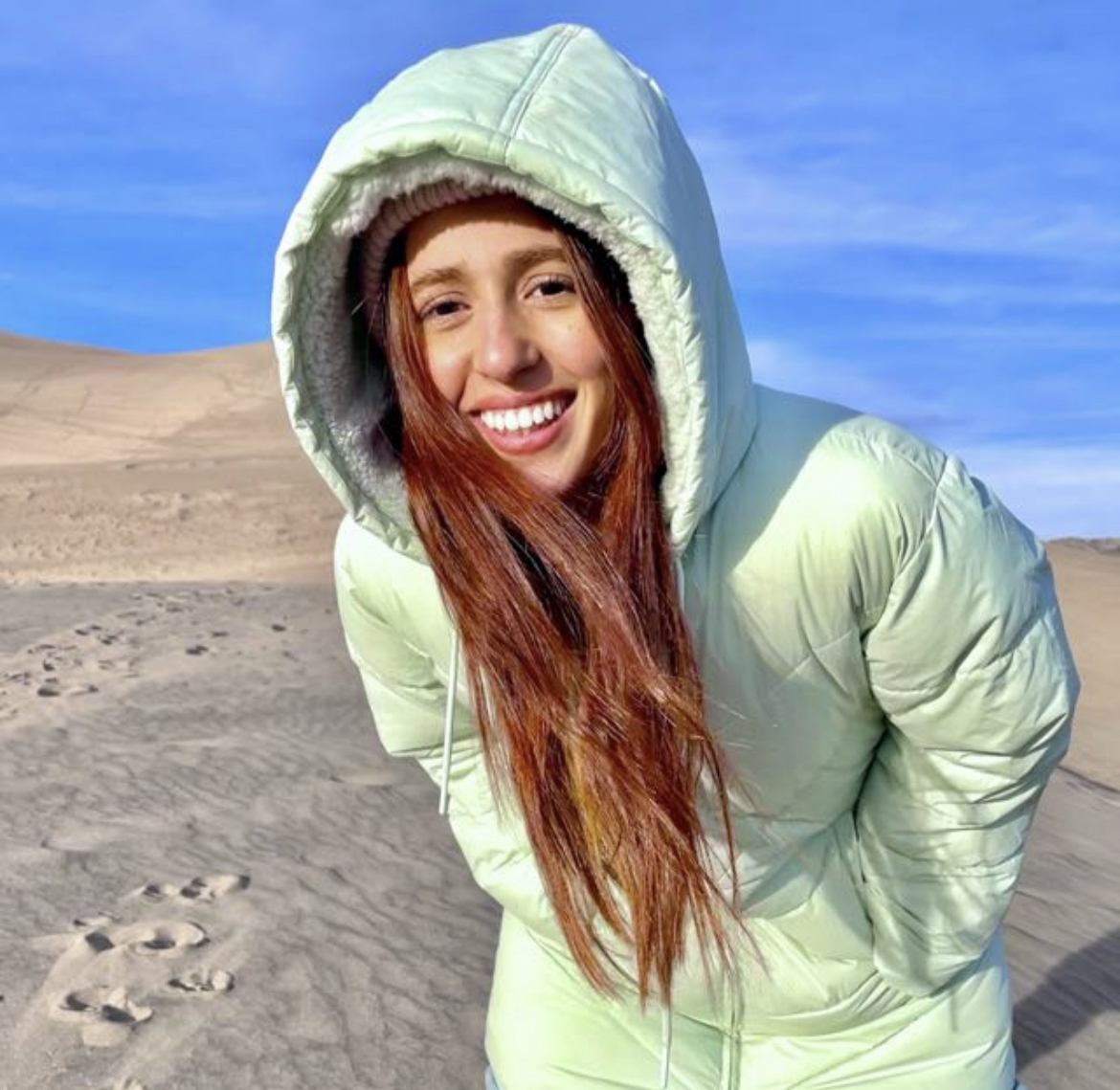

Personal information
- Native name: שיינא וספי
- Nationality: Israel
- Born: c.2002
- Home town: Yesud HaMa'ala

Sport
- Country: Israel
- Sport: Para-alpine skiing

Sheina Vaspi (Hebrew: שיינא וספי) is an Israeli Paralympic alpine skier. She represented Israel at the 2022 Winter Paralympics held in Beijing, China in alpine skiing. She is the first Israeli athlete ever to compete at the Winter Paralympic Games.

== Biography ==
Vaspi was born in Yesud HaMa'ala in northern Israel, to a Chabad Hasidic family. She is the granddaughter of Lieutenant Colonel Yoav Vaspi, who was killed in the Yom Kippur War. When she was three years old, she was seriously injured in a car accident and as a result, her left leg was amputated.

As part of the rehabilitation process, Vaspi began skiing at the age of 16, with the Erez Foundation, under the auspices of The Israel Sports Association for the Disabled and the Israeli Paralympics Committee.

== Career ==
The Erez Association and Sports Association for the Disabled supported her aspirations for competitive skiing. She subsequently moved to Colorado in the United States for training, where she spent at least half the year. Vaspi's coach is Scott Olson, with whom she trains at the National Sports Center for the Disabled in Colorado.

Vaspi does not compete on the Shabbat and competes wearing a skirt, in accordance with her family's religious observances.

=== Competitions in 2022 ===
In January 2022, Vaspi competed internationally at the World Para Snow Sports Championships in Lillehammer, Norway. She finished in 13th place in the giant slalom event. She then participated in the final World Cup competition of the season in Åre, Sweden.

=== Beijing Paralympic Games 2022 ===
Vaspi is the first athlete to represent Israel at any winter Paralympics. She competed at the 2022 Winter Paralympics in Beijing, China, in the Alpine Skiing event giant slalom. The disability category is LW2 and as such, she competed upright on her right leg, with both hands holding a ski pole. She was not able to compete in the women's slalom event after a change in schedule caused a conflict with Shabbat.
