= Giovanni Malagò =

Italian sports executive and futsal player (born 1959)

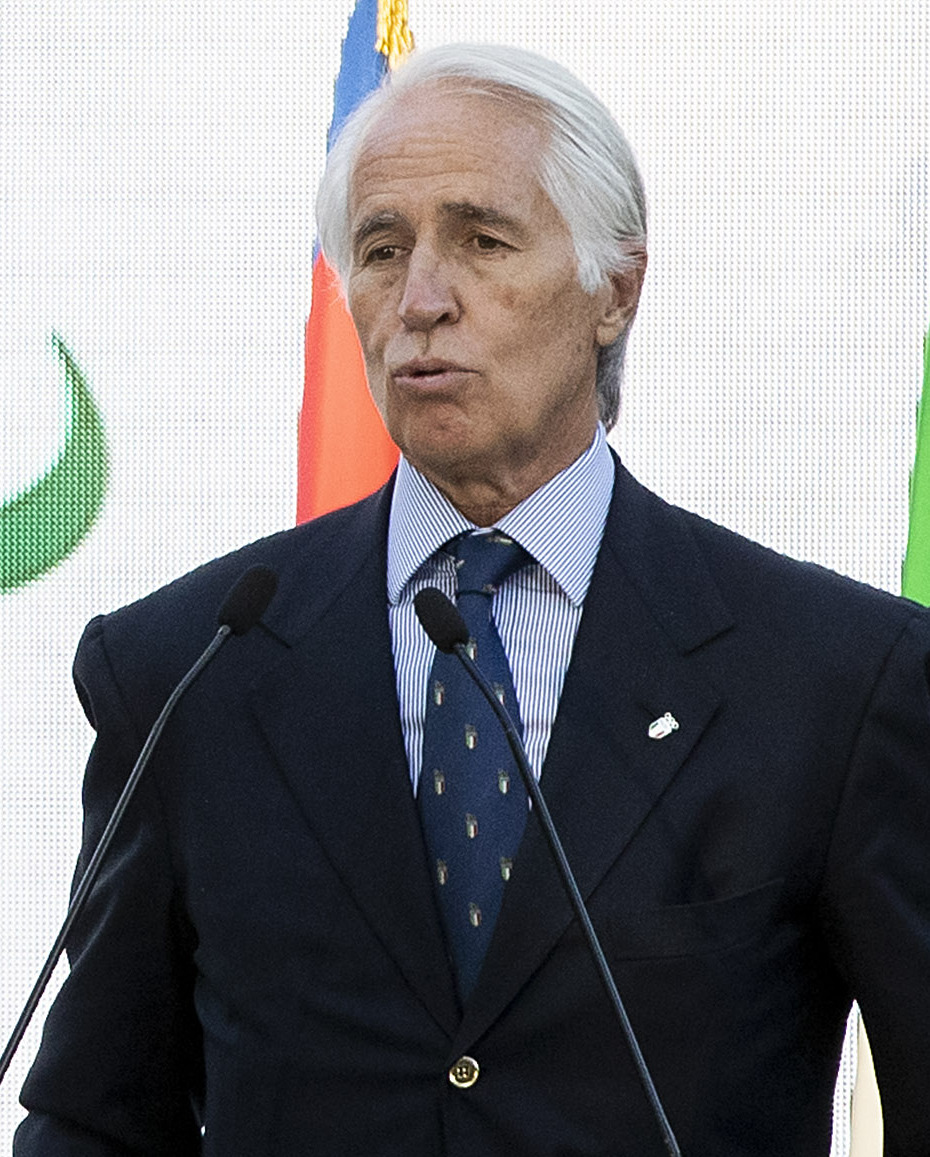
- Malagò in 2021

President of FIGC
- In office 22 June 2026 – 6 October 2026
- Preceded by: Gabriele Gravina

President of CONI
- In office 19 February 2013 – 26 June 2025
- Preceded by: Gianni Petrucci
- Succeeded by: Luciano Buonfiglio

President of the Milano Cortina Organising Committee for the 2026 Olympic and Paralympic Winter Games
- In office 20 February 2022 – 15 March 2026
- Leader: Thomas Bach (2019–25); Kirsty Coventry (2025–26)
- Preceded by: Cai Qi (Beijing 2022)
- Succeeded by: Edgar Grospiron (French Alps 2030)

Chair of the Milano Cortina Organising Committee for the 2026 Olympic and Paralympic Winter Games
- In office 10 December 2019 – 15 March 2026
- Preceded by: Position established
- Succeeded by: Position abolished

Personal details
- Born: 13 March 1959 (age 67) Rome, Italy
- Occupation: Sports executive

Giovanni Malagò (born 13 March 1959) is an Italian businessman, sports executive, and former futsal player. He is the former president of the Italian National Olympic Committee (CONI). Since 1 January 2019, he has been serving as a member of the International Olympic Committee.

Malagò served as president of the Italian Football Federation from 22 June 2026 until 6 October 2026. He currently serves as the federation's special commissioner pending a new presidential election.

== Life and career ==
Born in Rome, Malagò practiced since his youth different sports and notably futsal, in which discipline he won 3 league titles with Roma RCB and in 1986 he attended with the national team the World Cup in Brazil. After graduating in economics, he became CEO of Samocar, a car sales company founded by his father Vincenzo in 1977. As a sports executive he became chairman of the sports club Aniene Rowing Club in 1997 and then he was chairman of the organizing committee of the Italian Open of tennis.

In 2000, Malagò became a member of the Executive of the Italian National Olympic Committee, dealing with many international sporting events organized in Italy, such as the European Volleyball Championship in 2005 and the World Swimming Championships in 2009. On 19 February 2013 he was resoundingly elected President of CONI against Raffaele Pagnozzi, secretary general of the Committee since 1993, who had the support of the outgoing President Gianni Petrucci and of the major sports federations including the Italian Football Federation. Malagò led the organizing committee of the 2026 Winter Olympics in Milan and Cortina d'Ampezzo.

On 22 June 2026, Malagò became president of the Italian Football Federation (FIGC) with over 68 percent of the vote, following the resignation of Gabriele Gravina when Italy failed to qualify for the 2026 FIFA World Cup. The following month, Malagò announced that Roberto Mancini would return as head coach of the Italian national team.

On 6 October 2026, Malagò's presidency ended following concerns about his eligibility for election, as he had not been a registered member of the federation at the time of the vote. He was subsequently appointed special commissioner of the FIGC to oversee its operations pending a new presidential election, scheduled for 14 December 2026.

== See also ==
- Circolo Canottieri Aniene

Sporting positions
Preceded by (China) Cai Qi	President of Organizing Committee for Winter Olympic Games; 2026	Succeeded by (France) Edgar Grospiron
