= 2022 Winter Paralympics =

Multi-parasport event in Beijing, China

XIII Paralympic Winter Games
- Location: Beijing, China
- Motto: Together for a Shared Future; (Chinese: 一起向未来)
- Nations: 46
- Athletes: 564
- Events: 78 in 6 sports
- Opening: 4 March 2022
- Closing: 13 March 2022
- Opened by: Xi Jinping; President of China
- Closed by: Andrew Parsons; President of the International Paralympic Committee
- Cauldron: Li Duan
- Stadium: Beijing National Stadium

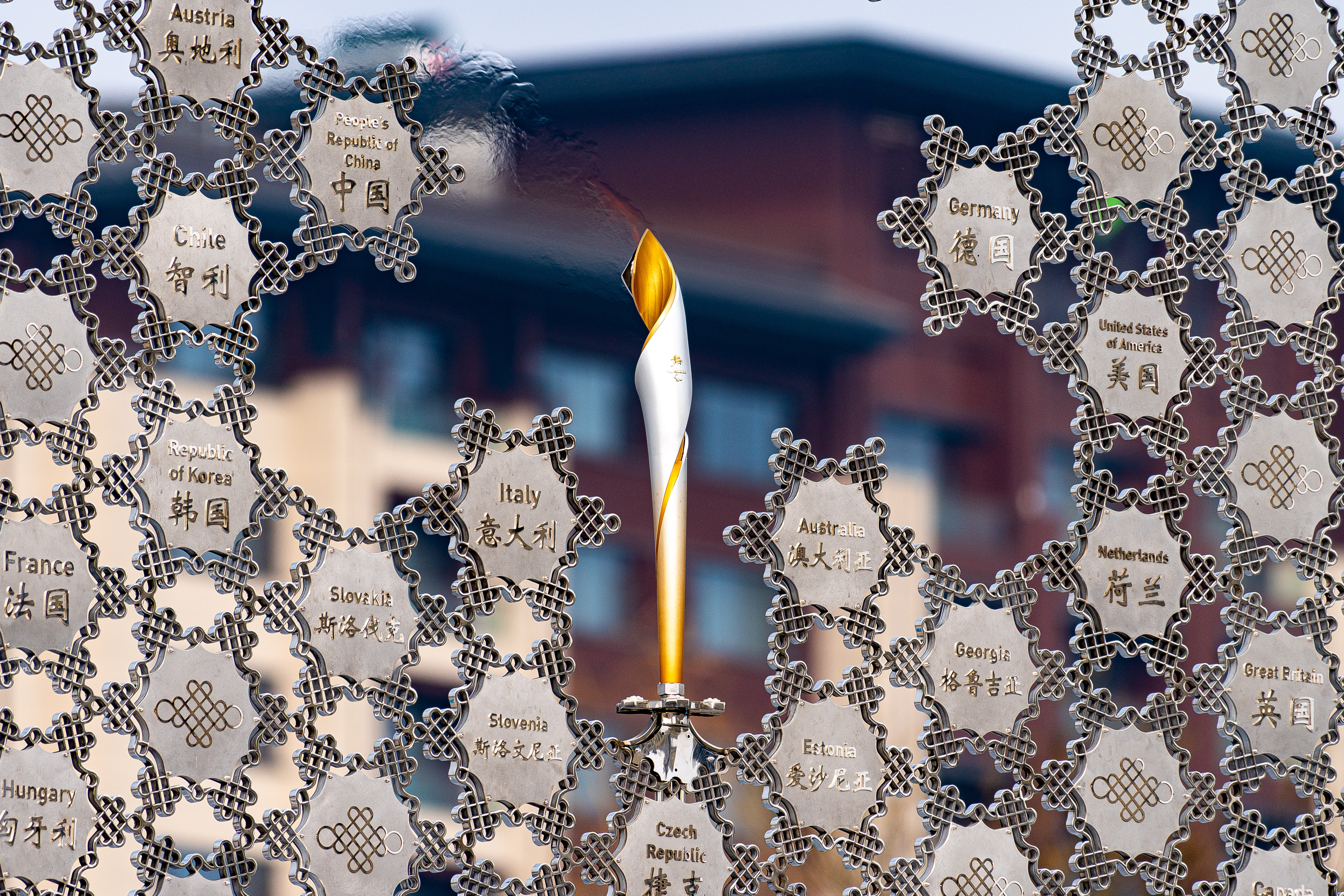
One of the four cauldrons used during the 2022 Winter Olympics and Paralympics

The 2022 Winter Paralympics (Chinese: 2022年冬季残疾人奥林匹克运动会; pinyin: 2022 Nián Dōngjì Cánjí Rén Àolínpǐkè Yùndònghuì), also known as XIII Paralympic Winter Games, commonly known as Beijing 2022 (Chinese: 北京2022), were an international winter multi-sport parasports event held in Beijing, China, from 4 to 13 March 2022. This was the 13th Winter Paralympic Games, as administered by the International Paralympic Committee (IPC).

Beijing was selected as the host city for the 2022 Winter Olympics and Paralympics in 2015 at the 128th IOC Session in Kuala Lumpur, Malaysia; taking into account its hosting of the 2008 Summer Paralympics, Beijing is the first city to have hosted both the Summer and Winter Olympics as well as the Summer and Winter Paralympics. This was the overall second Paralympics in China. It was the last of three consecutive Paralympics hosted in East Asia.

These Games featured 564 athletes representing 46 National Paralympic Committees (NPCs), competing in 78 medal events across six sports.

Participation in the Games was impacted by the ongoing Russian invasion of Ukraine; the International Olympic Committee (IOC) condemned Russia for violating the Olympic Truce, and the IPC ultimately banned Russian and Belarusian athletes from competing.

While the IPC initially announced that the countries' athletes would be allowed to compete independently under the Paralympic flag, it backtracked on 3 March 2022 – the eve of the opening ceremonies – following threats of a boycott by multiple NPCs, and announced that Belarusian and Russian athletes would be prohibited from competing. The Belarusian and Russian delegations competed at a replacement event from 17 to 21 March in Khanty-Mansiysk, Russia. Armenia, Kazakhstan and Tajikistan also competed at the replacement event.

Host nation China finished at the top of the medal table, winning a total of 61 medals, of which 18 were gold, setting a new record as the most successful Asian country at a single Winter Paralympics with the most total medals, gold, silver, and bronze. Ukraine also made their best historical performance and finished in second place with 29 medals, of which 11 were gold, and Canada retained the third place achieved in 2010, 2014 and 2018 with a total of 25 medals, of which eight were gold again.

== Host selection ==
As part of a formal agreement between the International Paralympic Committee and the International Olympic Committee first established in 2001, the winner of the bid for the 2022 Winter Olympics was also to host the 2022 Winter Paralympics.

Beijing was selected as the host city of the 2022 Winter Olympics after beating Almaty by four votes on 31 July 2015 at the 128th IOC Session in Kuala Lumpur, Malaysia.

2022 Winter Olympics bidding results
City	Nation	Votes
Beijing	China	44
Almaty	Kazakhstan	40

== Opening ceremony ==
The opening ceremony was held on 4 March 2022 at the Beijing National Stadium; it was directed by Zhang Yimou, with the theme "Blossoming of Life".

During his opening remarks, IPC president Andrew Parsons condemned the Russian invasion of Ukraine and the circumvention of the Olympic Truce by Russia, emphasising that Paralympic athletes compete with, and not "against", each other, and that "the 21st century is a time for dialogue and diplomacy, not war and hate". The final torchbearer was four-time Chinese para-athletics gold medalist Li Duan, who mounted the torch at the centre of a large snowflake sculpture.

== Closing ceremony ==
The closing ceremony was held on 13 March 2022. The ceremony closed after nine days of competition and 78 events at the Beijing National Stadium in Beijing, China.

== Sports ==
Seventy-eight events in five sports were held during the 2022 Winter Paralympics, two lower than 2018. In June 2019, the IPC dropped four of the six proposed disciplines for women's snowboard (leaving only LL2 banked slalom and snowboard cross), as they did not meet the required viability benchmarks during the 2019 World Para Snowboard Championships.

- Alpine skiing (30)
- Nordic skiing
  - Biathlon (18)
  - Cross-country skiing (20)
- Ice hockey (1)
- Snowboard (8)
- Wheelchair curling (1)

== Venues ==
Paralympic clusters

=== Beijing cluster ===
Olympic Green venues

- Beijing National Aquatics Center – wheelchair curling
- Beijing National Indoor Stadium – ice hockey
- Beijing National Stadium – opening and closing ceremonies
- Beijing Paralympic Village
- China National Convention Center – MPC/IBC

=== Yanqing District cluster ===
- Xiaohaituo Alpine Skiing Field – alpine skiing
- Yanqing MMC: Media Center
- Yanqing Paralympic Village and Medal Plaza

=== Zhangjiakou cluster ===
- Kuyangshu Biathlon Field – cross-country skiing and biathlon
- Genting Resort – snowboard
- Zhangjiakou Paralympic Village and Medal Plaza

== Torch relay ==
The heritage flame for the 2022 Winter Paralympics was lit in Stoke Mandeville, United Kingdom on 1 March and was sent virtually to Beijing, when another eight flames were lit and collected around the city and Zhangjiakou merged in a small ceremony in front of the Temple of Heaven during the March 3 evening in a small ceremony in front of the Temple of Heaven. The following day, the unified fire was brought to Zhangjiakou and two another places in Beijing, including the Olympic Green. During the opening day, the torch relay continued at three more locations including the Beijing 2022 Organizing Committee (BOCOG) headquarters and finished the same night at the Beijing National Stadium during the opening ceremonies, when the Paralympic Cauldron was lit.

== Participating National Paralympics Committees ==
In total, 46 National Paralympic Committees have qualified athletes. Azerbaijan, Israel and Puerto Rico made their Winter Paralympic debut, while Liechtenstein, Estonia, and Latvia returned for the first time since Lillehammer 1994, Salt Lake 2002, and Turin 2006, respectively. Russia and Belarus were excluded from participation or prohibited from participating. A new record of 138 female athletes were scheduled to compete, which was five more than the 133 female athletes in 2018.

On 24 February 2022, the first day of the Russian invasion of Ukraine, the International Olympic Committee condemned the breach of the Olympic Truce (which lasts from the beginning of the Olympics through the end of the Paralympics) by Russia. President of the IPC Andrew Parsons stated that getting the Ukrainian team to Beijing would be a "mammoth challenge". The IOC called for the flags of both Russia and Belarus not to be displayed at any international sporting event, the latter due to the country's support of Russia's aggression, and officials of the Belarus Olympic Committee having been accused of political discrimination against Belarusian athletes. The Russian flag has already been prohibited from international sporting events through December 2021 due to sanctions by the World Anti-Doping Agency (WADA), and its athletes would have originally participated under the name "RPC" (Russian Paralympic Committee).

On 28 February 2022, the IOC Executive Board further called for Russian and Belarusian athletes not to be included in or allowed to participate in any international sporting event. On 2 March 2022, the IPC declared that Russian and Belarusian athletes would be included independently under or allowed to participate independently under the Paralympic flag, with their results not counting in the medal standings. As a result of criticism by several National Paralympic Committees, who threatened to boycott the Games, the IPC announced on 3 March 2022 that they would reverse their earlier decision, banning Russian and Belarusian athletes from competing at the 2022 Winter Paralympics. In response, Vladimir Putin's press secretary Dmitry Peskov condemned the IPC for the decision. In response, Russia hosted a replacement event named "We are together, Sport" that was attended by Russia, Belarus, Kazakhstan, Tajikistan, and Armenia.

Azerbaijan was scheduled to make its debut, but its only athlete was seriously injured at the last training session on the eve of the start and did not compete in his event. However, the country participated in the Parade of Nations in both the opening and closing ceremonies.

Participating/allowed/included countries Debuting countries Host city (Beijing) Prohibited/excluded countries

Countries by team size

Participating National Paralympic Committees
Andorra (1); Argentina (2); Australia (7); Austria (16); Azerbaijan (1); Belgium (2); Bosnia and Herzegovina (2); Brazil (6); Canada (45); Chile (4); China (96) (Host); Croatia (4); Czech Republic (21); Denmark (1); Estonia (5); Finland (6); France (15); Georgia (1); Germany (18); Great Britain (21); Greece (2); Hungary (1); Iceland (1); Iran (4); Israel (1); Italy (29); Japan (29); Kazakhstan (5); Latvia (5); Liechtenstein (1); Mexico (1); Mongolia (3); Netherlands (8); New Zealand (3); Norway (13); Poland (11); Puerto Rico (1); Romania (2); Slovakia (28); Slovenia (1); South Korea (32); Spain (2); Sweden (10); Switzerland (12); Ukraine (20); United States (65)
NPCs that participated in 2022, but did not in 2018	NPCs that participated in 2018, but not in 2022	NPCs which qualified for 2022, but were banned
Azerbaijan; Estonia; Israel; Latvia; Liechtenstein; Puerto Rico	Armenia; Bulgaria; North Korea; Serbia; Tajikistan; Turkey; Uzbekistan	Belarus; Russia

=== Number of athletes by National Paralympic Committee ===
564 athletes from 46 NPCs:

Ranking	NPC	Athletes
1	China	96
2	United States	65
3	Canada	45
4	South Korea	32
5	Italy	29
6	Japan	29
7	Slovakia	28
8	Czech Republic	21
9	Great Britain	21
10	Ukraine	20
11	Germany	18
12	Austria	16
13	France	15
14	Norway	13
15	Switzerland	12
16	Poland	11
17	Sweden	10
18	Netherlands	8
19	Australia	7
20	Brazil	6
21	Finland	6
22	Estonia	5
23	Kazakhstan	5
24	Latvia	5
25	Chile	4
26	Croatia	4
27	Iran	4
28	Mongolia	3
29	New Zealand	3
30	Argentina	2
31	Belgium	2
32	Bosnia and Herzegovina	2
33	Greece	2
34	Romania	2
35	Spain	2
36	Andorra	1
37	Azerbaijan	1
38	Denmark	1
39	Georgia	1
40	Hungary	1
41	Iceland	1
42	Israel	1
43	Liechtenstein	1
44	Mexico	1
45	Puerto Rico	1
46	Slovenia	1
Total		564

== Calendar ==
In the following calendar for the 2022 Winter Paralympics, each blue box represents an event competition. The yellow boxes represent days during which medal-awarding finals for a sport were held. The number in each yellow box represents the number of finals that were contested on that day. Some events, such as the men's and women's banked slalom snowboarding finals, were moved as a result of warm weather conditions.

All times and dates use China Standard Time (UTC+8)

OC	Opening ceremony	●	Event competitions	1	Gold medal events	CC	Closing ceremony

March 2022	March										Events
March 2022	4th Fri	5th Sat	6th Sun	7th Mon	8th Tue	9th Wed	10th Thu	11th Fri	12th Sat	13th Sun	Events
Ceremonies	OC									CC	—N/a
Alpine skiing		6	6	6			3	3	3	3	30
Biathlon		6			6			6			18
Cross-country skiing			2	4		6			6	2	20
Para ice hockey		●	●		●	●		●	●	1	1
Snowboarding			●	4				4			8
Wheelchair curling		●	●	●	●	●	●	●	1		1
Daily medal events		12	8	14	6	6	3	13	10	6	78
Cumulative total		12	20	34	40	46	49	62	72	78	78
March 2022	4th Fri	5th Sat	6th Sun	7th Mon	8th Tue	9th Wed	10th Thu	11th Fri	12th Sat	13th Sun	Total events
March 2022	March										Total events

== Medal summary ==
* Host nation (Host nation)

2022 Winter Paralympics medal table
Rank	NPC	Gold	Silver	Bronze	Total
1	China*	18	20	23	61
2	Ukraine	11	10	8	29
3	Canada	8	6	11	25
4	France	7	3	2	12
5	United States	6	11	3	20
6	Austria	5	5	3	13
7	Germany	4	8	7	19
8	Norway	4	2	1	7
9	Japan	4	1	2	7
10	Slovakia	3	0	3	6
11–19	Remaining	8	12	15	35
Totals (19 entries)		78	78	78	234

=== Podium sweeps ===
Date	Sport	Event	Team	Gold	Silver	Bronze	Ref
5 March	Biathlon	Men's 6 kilometres vision impaired	Ukraine	Vitaliy Lukyanenko; Guide: Borys Babar	Oleksandr Kazik; Guide: Serhii Kucheriavyi	Dmytro Suiarko; Guide: Oleksandr Nikonovych	
7 March	Snowboarding	Men's snowboard cross UL	China	Yang Jian	Wang Pengyao	Zhu Yonggang	
8 March	Biathlon	Women's 10 kilometres standing	Ukraine	Iryna Bui	Oleksandra Kononova	Liudmyla Liashenko	
8 March	Biathlon	Men's 10 kilometres vision impaired	Ukraine	Vitaliy Lukyanenko; Guide: Borys Babar	Anatolii Kovalevskyi; Guide: Oleksandr Mukshyn	Dmytro Suiarko; Guide: Oleksandr Nikonovych	

During the medals ceremony, the Ukrainians' men's 6 kilometres vision impaired biathlon silver and bronze medal teams were mistakenly placed in each other's podium positions.

== Branding ==
=== Emblem ===
The emblem for the 2022 Winter Paralympics, "Flying High" ("飞得很高"), was unveiled alongside its Olympic counterpart on 15 December 2017 at the Beijing National Aquatics Center. Designed by Lin Cunzhen, it is a multi-coloured ribbon resembling the Chinese character for "fly" (飞"), and is designed to symbolize "an athlete in a wheelchair rushing towards the finish line and victory". They are the first Paralympics to use an updated version of the "agitos" emblem in an official capacity.

=== Mascot ===
The mascot "Shuey Rhon Rhon" (Chinese: 雪容融; pinyin: Xuě Róng Róng) was unveiled on 17 September 2019 at the Shougang Ice Hockey Arena and was designed by Jiang Yufan. The mascot is designed with lanterns as the prototype. Lanterns represent harvest, celebration, warmth and light. The wishful shape at the top symbolizes auspicious happiness; the continuous pattern of the dove of peace and the Temple of Heaven symbolizes the peaceful friendship and highlights the characteristics of the place where the place is held; the decorative pattern incorporates the traditional Chinese paper-cut art; the snow on the face represents the meaning of "a fall of seasonable snow gives promise of a fruitful year" (Chinese: 瑞雪兆丰年; pinyin: Ruìxuě zhào fēngnián). It also reflects the anthropomorphic design and highlights the mascot's cuteness.

== Broadcasting ==
In January 2021, Infront Sports & Media acquired the rights to the 2022 Winter Paralympics and 2024 Summer Paralympics in 51 European countries (aside from Great Britain for 2022 and France for 2024), replacing the European Broadcasting Union (EBU), which had held the pan-European rights since 2014. The rights would be resold to broadcasters in each region.

== See also ==
Olympic and Paralympic Games hosted in China:

- 2008 Summer Olympics
- 2008 Summer Paralympics
- 2022 Winter Olympics

== Notes ==
Preceded by Pyeongchang	Winter Paralympics; Beijing; XIII Paralympic Winter Games (2022)	Succeeded by Milan–Cortina d'Ampezzo
