= Fondazione Milano Cortina 2026 =

2026 Olympics local organizing committee

The Fondazione Milano Cortina 2026 was a public institution with legal person status, responsible for the organisation and coordination of all the preparations and delivery of the 2026 Olympic and Paralympic Winter Games.

== Organisation structure ==
=== Leadership ===
Position	Name	Birthdate	Other office(s)
President	Giovanni Malagò	March 13, 1959 (age 67)	Former president of Italian National Olympic Committee
Vice President	Marco Giunio De Sanctis	September 1962 (age 63)	President of the Italian Paralympic Committee

== See also ==
- 2026 Winter Olympics
- 2026 Winter Paralympics
