= 2026 Winter Paralympics =

Multi-parasport event in Milan and Cortina d'Ampezzo, Italy

XIV Paralympic Winter Games
- Location: Milan and Cortina d'Ampezzo, Italy
- Motto: IT's Your Vibe (Note: Only an English motto is used during the Games. There is no Italian equivalent of the motto adopted.)
- Nations: 55
- Athletes: 611
- Events: 79 in 6 sports
- Opening: 6 March 2026
- Closing: 15 March 2026
- Opened by: President Sergio Mattarella
- Closed by: IPC president Andrew Parsons
- Cauldron: Gianmaria Dal Maistro (Milan); Francesca Porcellato (Cortina d'Ampezzo)
- Stadium: Verona Arena (Note: Named "Verona Olympic Arena" during the Games.) (Opening ceremony); Cortina Olympic Ice Stadium (Note: Named "Cortina Curling Olympic Stadium" during the Games.) (Closing ceremony)

The 2026 Winter Paralympics (Italian: Giochi paralimpici invernali di Milano Cortina 2026), also known as the Milano Cortina 2026 Winter Paralympic Games, were the 14th edition of the Winter Paralympic Games, an international winter multi-sport parasports event governed by the International Paralympic Committee. It took place from 6 to 15 March at sites across Lombardy, Veneto and Trentino-Alto Adige/Südtirol, with competition in wheelchair curling beginning on 4 March.

Marking the 50th anniversary of the inaugural Winter Paralympics in 1976, this was the third Paralympic Games hosted in Italy, following the 1960 Summer Paralympics in Rome (the inaugural Paralympic Games) and the 2006 Winter Paralympics in Turin. These were the final winter games to take place under the IPC presidency of Andrew Parsons.

China finished at the top of the medal table for the second successive Winter Paralympics with 15 gold and 44 medals overall, and the United States finished second with 13 gold and 24 medals. Russia finished in third with 8 gold and 12 medals. The host nation Italy finished in fourth with 7 gold and 16 medals, setting a new record for number of medals won. Brazil won its first medal in their Winter Paralympic history, becoming the first tropical, Latin American and South American National Paralympic Committee to win a medal at the Winter Paralympics. Latvia also won its first medal in its Winter Paralympic history.

The edition drew controversy surrounding its inclusion of Russian and Belarusian athletes for the first time since the 2022 Russian invasion of Ukraine.

== Host selection ==
In October 2018, the Italian National Olympic Committee officially confirmed plans for a bid by Milan and Cortina d'Ampezzo to host the Games. The bid was presented at the general assembly of the Association of National Olympic Committees on 28 November 2018 in Tokyo. The two cities were elected as hosts of both the 2026 Paralympics and Olympics on 24 June 2019 at the 134th IOC Session in Lausanne, Switzerland, defeating Sweden's joint bid of Stockholm and Åre.

2026 Winter Olympics bidding results
Bid	Nation	Votes
Milan–Cortina d'Ampezzo	Italy	47
Stockholm–Åre	Sweden	34
One abstention or blank vote

== Development and preparations ==
=== Handover ceremony ===
The handover occurred during the closing ceremony of the 2022 Winter Paralympics in Beijing, China, on 13 March. The Paralympic flag was passed from Beijing mayor Chen Jining to IPC president Andrew Parsons, and then to Anna Scavuzzo, vice-mayor of Milan, and Gianpietro Ghedina, mayor of Cortina d'Ampezzo. The flag was then flown back to Italy, where it arrived the following day. Both the Olympic flag and the Paralympic flag are displayed at Palazzo Marino and will remain there until the end of their respective events.

=== Torch relay ===
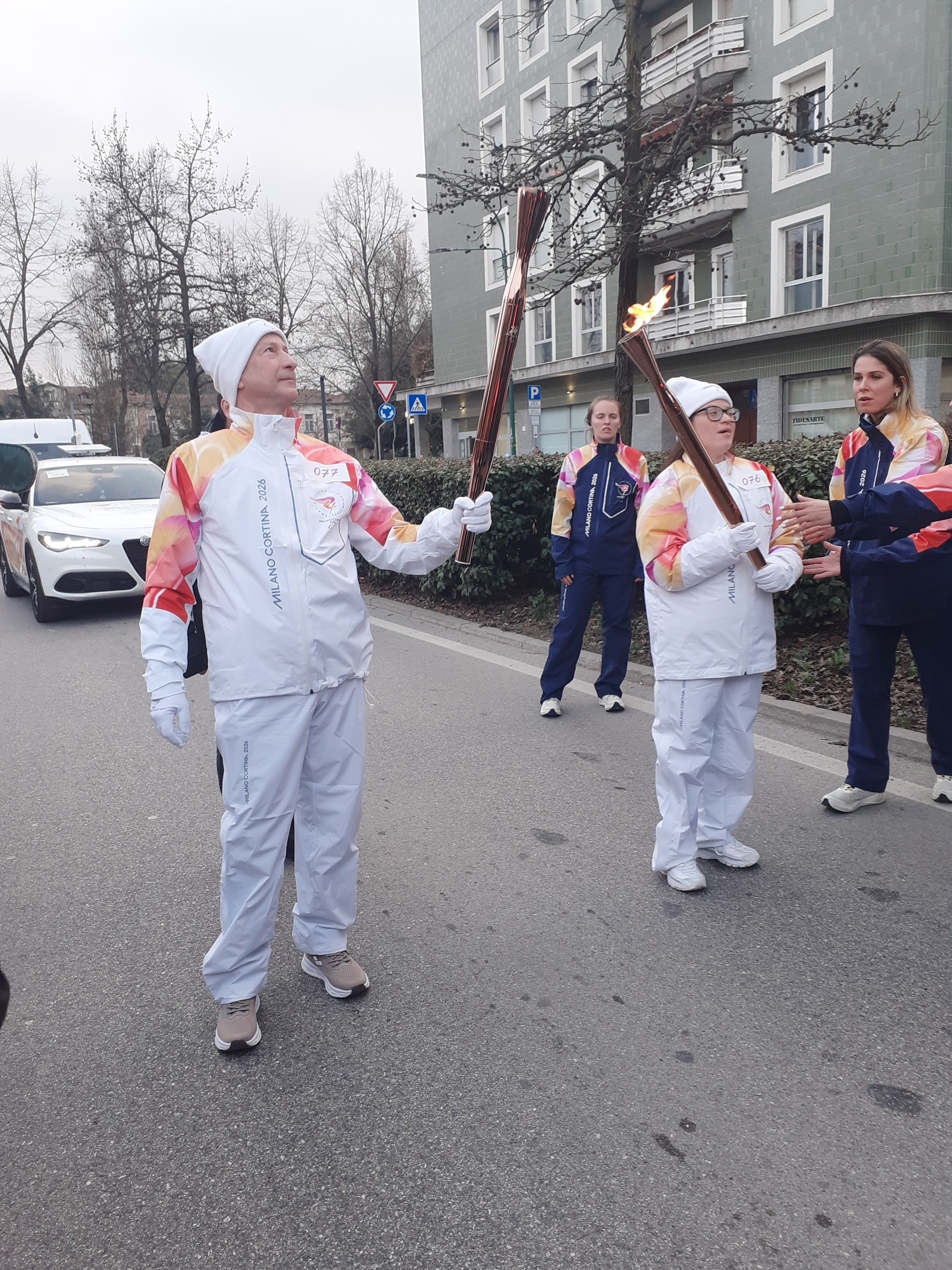
The Paralympic flame arrives in Mestre, Venice (4 March).

The torch relay took place from 24 February to 6 March 2026, with 501 torchbearers covering 2,000 kilometres (1,200 mi). The flame was lit at the Stoke Mandeville Hospital in the United Kingdom and was sent to five Italian cities; the relay visited Cortina d'Ampezzo, Venice, and Padua, ending at the Verona Arena for the opening ceremony.

The Paralympic torch was presented in a simultaneous event held in Milan in Italy and Osaka in Japan. It was revealed at the Triennale di Milano and at the Italian pavilion at Expo 2025 as a way of connecting the two twin cities, as Milan previously hosted Expo 2015. The torch is bronze whereas the corresponding Olympic torch is light blue.

Named "Essential"; developed by Eni and its subsidiary Versalis, designed by Studio Carlo Ratti Associati and produced in Italy by Cavagna Group, the torches are made primarily of an alloy of recycled aluminium and bronze. They run on bio-LPG, a fuel made from renewable materials, produced at the Enilive biorefinery in Gela, and have been designed to be refilled up to ten times in order to cut down on the number of torches produced.

=== Volunteers ===
A total of 18,000 volunteers were involved with both the 2026 Paralympic and Olympic Games. Applications for volunteering opened on 19 September 2024. As of December 2024, almost 70,000 applications have been received.

=== Ticketing ===
Tickets for the 2026 Paralympic Games started at €10 for children under 14. About 89% of all available tickets – more than 200,000 – were priced at under €35. Registration for the ticketing platform opened on 4 October 2024 and ticket sales started in March 2025.

=== Medals ===
The 2026 Winter Paralympics gold medal	The 2026 Winter Paralympics silver medal	The 2026 Winter Paralympics bronze medal

On 15 July 2025, the Milano Cortina 2026 Olympic and Paralympic Organising Committee unveiled the designs of the medals. The front side of each of the 2026 Winter Paralympic medals represents the Braille on the left and logo on the right, and the back is the Paralympics logo.

=== Venues ===
Facilities of the 2026 Winter Paralympics.

Five competition venues were used for the 2026 Paralympic Games, in addition to non-competitive venues including three Paralympic Villages.

==== Milan Cluster ====
- Milano Santa Giulia Ice Hockey Arena – Para ice hockey
- Milano Paralympic Village – Paralympic Village

==== Val di Fiemme Cluster ====
- Tesero Cross-Country Skiing Stadium – Para biathlon, para cross-country skiing
- Predazzo Olympic & Paralympic Village – Paralympic Village

==== Cortina Cluster ====
- Tofane Alpine Skiing Centre – Para alpine skiing
- Cortina Para Snowboard Park – Para snowboard
- Cortina Curling Olympic Stadium – Wheelchair curling, closing ceremony
- Cortina Paralympic Village – Paralympic Village

==== Verona ====
- Verona Olympic Arena – Opening ceremony

== The Games ==
=== Opening ceremony ===
The opening ceremony took place on 6 March 2026 at the Verona Arena in Verona, entitled Life in Motion, with production by Filmmaster Group. The Paralympic cauldrons were lit by Italian Paralympians Gianmaria Dal Maistro in Milan and Francesca Porcellato in Cortina d'Ampezzo.

A number of delegations skipped the opening ceremony entirely; some of these absences were for logistical reasons, as Verona is 250 kilometres (160 mi) from Cortina d'Ampezzo. A number of teams additionally boycotted the opening ceremony in protest of the IPC allowing Russian and Belarusian athletes to compete under their national flags. Organisers stated that all participating National Paralympic Committees (NPCs) would still be featured in the parade of nations regardless of athlete presence, with volunteer flag bearers and video packages being used to represent NPCs which could not attend.

=== Sports ===
The Games are expected to feature 79 events in six Winter Paralympic sports. A mixed doubles event made its debut in wheelchair curling. A total of 665 athlete quota places are available: 323 for men, 176 for women, and 166 gender-free.

- Para alpine skiing (30) ()
- Para biathlon (18) ()
- Para cross-country skiing (20) ()
- Para ice hockey (1) ()
- Para snowboard (8) ()
- Wheelchair curling (2) ()

=== Closing ceremony ===
The closing ceremony took place on 15 March 2026 at the Cortina Olympic Ice Stadium in Cortina d'Ampezzo, entitled Italian Souvenir, with production by G2 Eventi – Casta Diva Group. Several nations, led by Ukraine, boycotted the ceremony due to the participation of Russian and Belarusian athletes at the Games.

== Participating National Paralympic Committees ==
A total of 55 National Paralympic Committees have qualified athletes for the Games. For the first time since 2014 (due to the Russian doping scandal and 2022 Russian invasion of Ukraine), Russian and Belarusian athletes were allowed to compete under their flags, rather than neutrally (as they were at the Olympics).

El Salvador, Haiti, Montenegro, North Macedonia and Portugal made their Winter Paralympic debuts. El Salvador was also the only country not participating in the 2026 Winter Olympics that was participating in the 2026 Winter Paralympics. Iran was scheduled to participate, but its only athlete withdrew a few hours before the opening ceremony due to being unable to travel to Italy as a result of the United States and Israel attack on Iran.

Participating National Paralympic Committees
Andorra (1); Argentina (3); Armenia (1); Australia (12); Austria (15); Belarus (4); Belgium (3); Bosnia and Herzegovina (1); Brazil (8); Bulgaria (1); Canada (46); Chile (1); China (70); Croatia (5); Czech Republic (24); Denmark (1); El Salvador (2); Estonia (2); Finland (4); France (14); Georgia (2); Germany (40); Great Britain (19); Greece (2); Haiti (1); Iceland (1); Israel (1); Italy (42) (host); Japan (44); Kazakhstan (7); Latvia (7); Liechtenstein (1); Lithuania (1); Mexico (1); Mongolia (3); Montenegro (1); Netherlands (8); New Zealand (2); North Macedonia (1); Norway (15); Poland (9); Portugal (1); Puerto Rico (1); Romania (2); Russia (6); Serbia (1); Slovakia (28); Slovenia (2); South Korea (20); Spain (7); Sweden (14); Switzerland (9); Ukraine (25); United States (68); Uzbekistan (2)
NPCs that participated in 2026, but did not in 2022	NPCs that participated in 2022, but not in 2026	NPCs which qualified for 2026, but withdrew
Armenia; Belarus; Bulgaria; El Salvador; Haiti; Lithuania; Montenegro; North Macedonia; Portugal; Russia; Serbia; Uzbekistan	Azerbaijan; Hungary	Iran (Note: Withdrew due to being unable to travel to Italy as a result of the United States and Israel attack on Iran.)

=== Number of athletes by National Paralympic Committee ===
Ranking	NPC	Athletes
1	China	70
2	United States	68
3	Canada	46
4	Japan	44
5	Italy	42
6	Germany	40
7	Slovakia	28
8	Ukraine	25
9	Czech Republic	24
10	South Korea	20
11	Great Britain	19
12	Austria	15
12	Norway	15
14	France	14
14	Sweden	14
16	Australia	12
17	Poland	9
17	Switzerland	9
19	Brazil	8
19	Netherlands	8
21	Kazakhstan	7
21	Latvia	7
21	Spain	7
24	Russia	6
25	Croatia	5
26	Belarus	4
26	Finland	4
28	Argentina	3
28	Belgium	3
28	Mongolia	3
31	El Salvador	2
31	Estonia	2
31	Georgia	2
31	Greece	2
31	New Zealand	2
31	Romania	2
31	Slovenia	2
31	Uzbekistan	2
39	Andorra	1
39	Armenia	1
39	Bosnia and Herzegovina	1
39	Bulgaria	1
39	Chile	1
39	Denmark	1
39	Haiti	1
39	Iceland	1
39	Israel	1
39	Liechtenstein	1
39	Lithuania	1
39	Mexico	1
39	Montenegro	1
39	North Macedonia	1
39	Portugal	1
39	Puerto Rico	1
39	Serbia	1
Total		612

== Calendar ==
The schedule for the 2026 Paralympics was released on 9 December 2024. Due to wheelchair curling expansion program, the competitions started two days before the opening ceremony, with the first two rounds of the wheelchair curling mixed doubles.

OC	Opening ceremony	●	Event competitions	1	Event finals	CC	Closing ceremony

March 2026	04 Wed	05 Thu	06 Fri	07 Sat	08 Sun	09 Mon	10 Tue	11 Wed	12 Thu	13 Fri	14 Sat	15 Sun	Events
Ceremonies			OC									CC	—N/a
Para alpine skiing				6		6	6		3	3	3	3	30
Para biathlon				6	6					6			18
Para cross-country skiing							6	6			2	6	20
Para ice hockey				●		●	●		●	●	●	1	1
Para snowboard				●	4					4			8
Wheelchair curling	●	●	●	●	●	●	●	1	●	●	1		2
Daily medal events	0	0	0	12	10	6	12	7	3	13	6	10	79
Cumulative total	0	0	0	12	22	28	40	47	50	63	69	79	79
March 2026	04 Wed	05 Thu	06 Fri	07 Sat	08 Sun	09 Mon	10 Tue	11 Wed	12 Thu	13 Fri	14 Sat	15 Sun	Total events

== Medal table ==
* Host nation (Italy)

2026 Winter Paralympics medal table
Rank	NPC	Gold	Silver	Bronze	Total
1	China	15	13	16	44
2	United States	13	5	6	24
3	Russia	8	1	3	12
4	Italy*	7	7	2	16
5	Austria	7	2	4	13
6	France	4	4	4	12
7	Ukraine	3	8	8	19
8	Canada	3	4	8	15
9	Netherlands	3	3	1	7
10	Sweden	3	0	4	7
11–27	Remaining NPCs	13	32	24	69
Totals (27 entries)		79	79	80	238

Brazil won their first Winter Paralympics medal, a silver in the men's sprint sitting event with Cristian Ribera. Latvia also won their first Winter Paralympics medal, a bronze in the mixed doubles curling event with Poļina Rožkova and Agris Lasmans.

=== Podium sweeps ===
Date	Sport	Event	Team	Gold	Silver	Bronze	Ref
7 March	Para biathlon	Men's sprint, visually impaired	Ukraine	Oleksandr Kazik; Guide: Serhii Kucheriavyi	Iaroslav Reshetynskyi; Guide: Dmytro Drahun	Anatolii Kovalevskyi; Guide: Oleksandr Mukshyn	
15 March	Para cross-country skiing	Men's 20 kilometre freestyle, standing	China	Wang Chenyang	Huang Lingxin	Liu Xiaobin	

=== Multi-medallists ===
The following table lists the athletes who won the most medals.

Female athletes

#	Athletes	Gold	Silver	Bronze	Total
1	(Austria) Veronika Aigner	4	1	0	5
2	(United States) Oksana Masters (Note: In two different sports)	4	0	1	5
3	(United States) Jake Adicoff	4	0	0	4
4	(United States) Sydney Peterson	3	1	0	4
5	(Austria) Johannes Aigner	3	0	1	4
5	(Sweden) Ebba Årsjö	3	0	1	4
7	(China) Cai Jiayun	3	0	0	3
7	(Russia) Anastasiia Bagiian	3	0	0	3
7	(Netherlands) Jeroen Kampschreur	3	0	0	3
10	(South Korea) Kim Yun-ji	2	3	0	5
11	(Italy) Giacomo Bertagnolli	2	2	1	5
12	(China) Wang Yue	2	1	2	5
13	(Canada) Natalie Wilkie	2	1	1	4
13	(Russia) Varvara Voronchikhina	2	1	1	4
13	(Spain) Audrey Pascual	2	1	1	4
13	(Switzerland) Robin Cuche	2	1	1	4

== Marketing ==
=== Emblem ===
On 30 March 2021, following a public vote between two candidates designed by Landor Associates, a design named "Futura" was announced as the emblem of both the 2026 Winter Olympics and Paralympics. The Paralympic version is coloured with a red, blue, and green gradient to symbolise an aurora and the colours of the Paralympic agitos.

=== Mascot ===
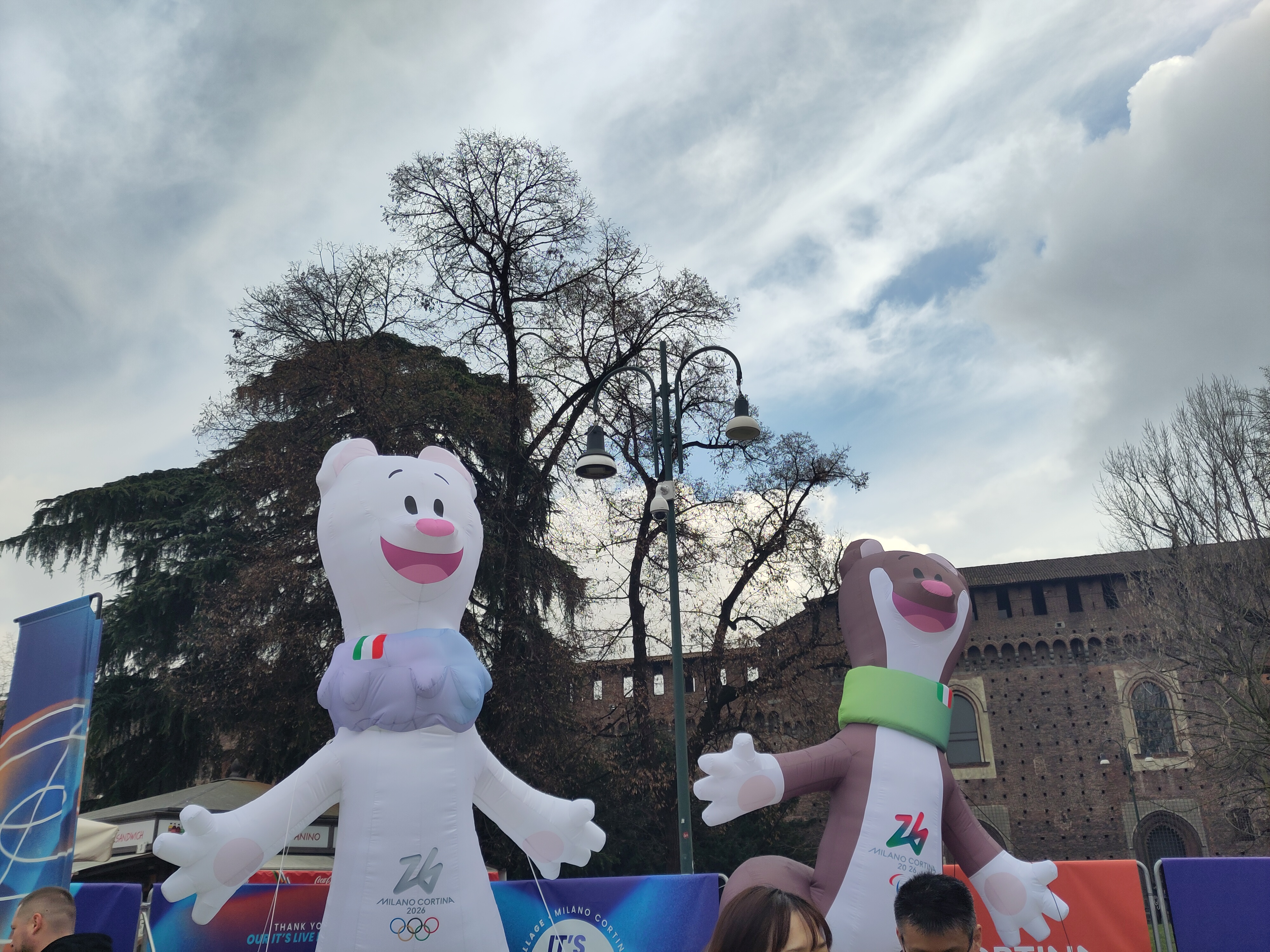
Tina and Milo

An online vote closing on 28 February 2023 was held among a list of candidates to select the mascots of the Olympics and Paralympics, with the winning candidates being inspired by stoats. Their names were revealed to be Tina and Milo (derived from the names of the host cities), with Milo, the brown stoat, being the Paralympic mascot. The character is portrayed as having been born without a leg and having learned to use his tail as a leg. Milo represents ingenuity, willpower and creativity.

=== Song ===
In March 2022, "Fino all'alba" (transl. Until dawn) by Arisa was unveiled as the official song for both the 2026 Winter Olympics and Paralympics. The song was composed by Francesco Marrone and Giulio Gianni.

=== Visual identity ===
The brand elements for both the 2026 Paralympic and Olympic Games were unveiled on 7 November 2024, drawing inspiration from gestures, which are commonly used in Italian communication. These include pictograms for the six Paralympic sports inspired by the movements of athletes. Five graphic elements named "vibes" were designed, with contemporary Italian figures selected to represent them on social media: musician Dardust (creativity), athlete Bebe Vio (energy), comedian Federico Basso (imagination), chef Davide Oldani (passion), and dancer Nicoletta Manni (style).

== Broadcasting ==
At least 300 hours of television coverage was provided. In October 2025, the European Broadcasting Union acquired rights to the Games in Europe, with rights to be sub-licensed to its members; the EBU re-gained the pan-European rights for the first time since 2018. Rights agreements were also renewed with CBC Sports (Canada, in partnership with the Canadian Paralympic Committee), and Grupo Globo (Brazil).

== Concerns and controversies ==
=== Participation of Russian and Belarusian athletes ===
Russian athletes had been prohibited from competing in the Paralympic Games under their name, flag, and national anthem since 2016. This sanction originally stemmed from the discovery of a state-sponsored doping program that had been active during the 2014 Winter Olympics and Paralympics in Sochi. Russia was banned entirely from the 2016 Summer Paralympics, and its athletes were allowed to compete neutrally under the Paralympic flag in 2018.

Following a ruling by the Court of Arbitration for Sport that challenged an outright ban from international sport by the World Anti-Doping Agency, Russia was allowed to send a semi-neutral team under the emblem of the Russian Paralympic Committee (RPC) at the 2020 Summer Paralympics. The team was, with exceptions, still prohibited from using the name, flag, or national anthem of Russia. RPC was also expected to compete in the 2022 Winter Paralympics. Due to the 2022 Russian invasion of Ukraine that began shortly before the Games, the IPC initially announced that RPC and Belarusian athletes would compete neutrally under the Paralympic flag. However, following the threat of boycotts by multiple NPCs, the IPC walked back the decision and banned Russian and Belarusian athletes from the Games entirely. Both nations' athletes competed under the banner of "Neutral Paralympic Athletes" at the 2024 Summer Paralympics.

In September 2025, the IPC reinstated the Russian Paralympic Committee, allowing Russian athletes to participate in IPC-sanctioned competitions with their flag and anthem. The IPC cited a desire to separate politics from sport, and believed that continuing to ban Russia from competition while allowing Israel to participate despite the Gaza war was inconsistent. The IPC noted in October 2025 that it was unlikely that Russia would be able to qualify any athletes to the Games: the FIS, IBU, and World Curling continued to prohibit Russian and Belarusian athletes from participating in Olympic and Paralympic qualifying competitions, even under a neutral status, and it was "not possible in practice" for Russia to qualify for Para ice hockey. In December 2025, the Court of Arbitration for Sport ruled in an appeal that Russian athletes who meet the IOC's criteria for individual neutral athletes, must be able to compete neutrally in FIS qualifying events for the 2026 Winter Olympics and Paralympics.

On 17 February 2026, it was reported that six Russian athletes and four Belarusian athletes across alpine skiing, cross-country skiing, and snowboarding had been awarded invitations by the Bipartite Commission, allowing them to compete in the Games. The decision was met with condemnation from Ukraine and its European allies, who considered it inappropriate for Russia and Belarus to return to international sport amid the still-ongoing Russian invasion of Ukraine. Ukrainian sports minister Matvii Bidnyi announced that Ukrainian officials would boycott the opening ceremony and some other events in protest against the participation of Russian athletes. Bidnyi argued that Russia uses Paralympic sport for propaganda purposes and criticized the International Paralympic Committee for allowing Russian representation at the Games. IPC president Andrew Parsons also stated that Russian soldiers injured in the war could be eligible to compete in future Paralympic Games.

Following the decision, Ukraine confirmed that its delegation would not attend the opening ceremony, and several other countries expressed solidarity with the boycott. These boycotts did not impact athlete participation, while some of these countries, among others, had already planned to not send their athletes to the opening ceremony for logistical reasons. EU commissioner for sport Glenn Micallef announced that he would not attend the opening ceremony, in solidarity with Ukraine. Ukraine's public broadcaster Suspilne announced that it would not broadcast the opening ceremony, while Estonian broadcaster Eesti Rahvusringhääling (ERR) announced that it would not broadcast any event featuring Russian or Belarusian athletes.

The Ukrainian delegation provided its athletes with a ceremonial uniform decorated with a map of the country, including Crimea and Donbas. However, the IPC prohibited its use, claiming that the uniform had political content, which was not appropriate for the context.

On 10 March, after Russia won a gold medal with Anastasiia Bagiian and her guide Sergei Siniakin in the women's sprint classic vision impaired event, the German silver medalists Linn Kazmaier and Florian Baumann turned their backs towards the Russian athletes on the podium, citing not supporting the "system" in Russia. They were also turned their backs by the Czech silver medalists Simona Bubeníčková and David Srutek and German bronze medalists Leonie Walter and Christian Krasman on 11 March, and a third time by the same Czech silver medalists Simona Bubeníčková and David Srutek on 15 March.

On 15 March, IPC president Andrew Parsons said he was ″disappointed″ with the complaints from the Ukrainian National Paralympic Committee, saying that ″I do hope this is a lesson learned also for those NPCs that have chosen to focus more on the political side than on the sport side, because sport has prevailed″. In turn, Valerii Sushkevych, president of Ukraine's National Paralympic Committee, said that calling for peace and stopping the war was a human-rights issue, not a political statement. Sushkevych also said that the ceremonies are not sporting competitions, but are used as a political event by the IPC.

=== Israel and United States attack on Iran ===
On 28 February, during the period of the Olympic Truce and six days before the opening ceremony, a coordinated joint attack was launched in Iran by Israel and the United States in an attempt to force regime change, including the killing of Supreme Leader Ali Khamenei and several other Iranian officials. Iran was scheduled to send one athlete—cross-country skier Aboulfazl Khatibi Mianaei—to the Games.

The IPC stated that it was monitoring the impact of the situation and Middle Eastern airspace closures on travel logistics, especially for athletes coming from the East Asia and Oceania regions. On 6 March, the IPC confirmed that Khatibi Mianaei had withdrawn from the Games; president Andrew Parsons stated, "[W]ith the conflict ongoing across the Middle East, the risk to human life is too high", and said that damage to infrastructure in the country made it difficult to communicate with the Iranian delegation.

=== Insufficient snowfall ===
The unusually mild conditions of the host venues were a cause of concern amongst athletes, with Canadian athlete Kurt Oatway stating: "These games need to be held a month earlier." The para-alpine skiing events at Olimpia delle Tofane saw multiple crashes, with some athletes blaming the slush conditions at the venue. Overall, unlike the Winter Olympics held a month before, snowmaking machines were used more often due to a lack of snowfall. In response, the International Olympic Committee stated that it was considering moving up both the Olympic and Paralympic Games due to climate change.

== See also ==
- 2013 Winter Universiade, held in the same region
- 2026 Winter Olympics
- 1960 Summer Paralympics, held in Rome
- 2006 Winter Paralympics, held in Turin
- 2026 Summer Youth Olympics
- 2028 Winter Youth Olympics, scheduled for the same host region

== Notes ==
Preceded by Beijing	Winter Paralympics; Milan–Cortina d'Ampezzo; 2026	Succeeded by Alps
