= Casimiro =

Name list

- Gender: Male
- Language: Spanish, Portuguese

Other names
- Alternative spelling: Casemiro

Casimiro or Casemiro may refer to:

== Given name ==
- Casemiro do Amaral (1892–1939), Brazilian footballer
- Casemiro Mior (born 1958), Brazilian football manager and former footballer
- Casimiro de Abreu (1839–1860), Brazilian poet, novelist and playwright
- Casimiro Alegre (1741–1825), Argentine militia officer and landowner
- Casimiro Asumu Nze (born 1975), Equatoguinean sprinter
- Casimiro Berenguer (1909–2000), Puerto Rican nationalist
- Casimiro Castro (1826–1889), Mexican painter and lithographer
- Casimiro Díaz (1693–1746), Spanish Augustinian friar
- Casimiro Gennari (1839–1914), Italian Catholic cardinal
- Casimiro Gómez Ortega (1741–1818), Spanish physician and botanist
- Casimiro Monteiro (1920–1993), Portuguese Goan assassin
- Casimiro Montenegro Filho (1904–2000), Brazilian army and air force officer
- Casimiro Olañeta (1795–1860), Bolivian politician
- Casimiro de Oliveira (1907–1970), Portuguese racing driver
- Casimiro Radice (1834–1908), Italian painter
- Casimiro Sainz (1853–1898), Spanish painter
- Casimiro Torres (1906-?), Chilean footballer
- Casimiro Ynares III (born 1973), Filipino politician
- Casimiro (streamer) (born 1993), Brazilian sports journalist and streamer

== Surname ==
- Acácio Casimiro (born 1949), Portuguese footballer
- Augusto Casimiro (1889–1967), Portuguese journalist
- Bayani Casimiro (1918–1989), Filipino dancer
- Carlos Casimiro (born 1976), Dominican Republic baseball player
- Casemiro (Carlos Henrique Casimiro; born 1992), Brazilian footballer
- Didier Casimiro (born 1966), Russian businessman, a VP of Rosneft
- Fernando Casimiro (1931–2014), Portuguese sprinter
- Gisela Casimiro (born 1984), Portuguese writer and activist
- Henrique Casimiro (born 1986), Portuguese cyclist
- Isabel Casimiro, Mozambican sociologist
- Joaquim Casimiro (1808–1862), Portuguese composer and organist
- Julie Casimiro (born 1962), American politician
- Luis Casimiro, Spanish basketball coach
- Manuel Casimiro (born 1941), Portuguese painter
