= Monte San Martino (disambiguation) =

Monte San Martino is a comune (municipality) in the Province of Macerata, Marche, Italy.

Monte San Martino may also refer to:

- Monte San Martino (Lecco), a mountain in Lombardy, Italy
- Monte San Martino (Varese Prealps), a mountain in Lombardy, Italy
- Monte San Martino (Julian Prealps), a mountain in Friuli-Venezia Giulia, Italy
