= Serafino Morazzone =

Italian Roman Catholic priest

Blessed Serafino Morazzone
- Born: 1 February 1747; Milan, Duchy of Milan
- Died: 13 April 1822 (aged 75); Chiuso, Lecco, Kingdom of Lombardy–Venetia
- Venerated in: Roman Catholic Church
- Beatified: 26 June 2011, Milan Cathedral, Milan, Italy by Cardinal Angelo Amato
- Feast: 13 April; 9 May (Ambrosian Rite)

Serafino Morazzone (1 February 1747 – 13 April 1822) was an Italian Roman Catholic priest. Morazzone served as a simple parish priest in Lecco from his ordination as a priest in 1773 until his death and became noted amongst the faithful for his personal holiness and dedication to the sacraments.

Morazzone's beatification process started in 1864 but later halted due to issues in Milan, and the cause remained inactive until its revitalization in the 1950s. He was named as Venerable in 2007 and was later beatified at the Milanese Duomo on 26 June 2011.

== Life ==
Serafino Morazzone was born in Milan in 1747 to Francesco Morazzone.

He received his education from the Jesuits. In 1760 he was vested in the cassock and in 1761 was given the tonsure; he later received two minor orders in 1764 and the other minor orders later in 1771. In 1773 he was ordained as a sub-deacon and then a deacon and was ordained to the priesthood on 9 May 1773 at the church of Santa Maria at San Satiro. Morazzone acted as a simple parish priest from his ordination until his death and served as the confessor to Alessandro Manzoni until at least 1818.

He died on 13 April 1822 and was interred in San Giovanni Battista church in Lecco. Cardinal Alfredo Ildefonso Schuster once referred to him as Milan's own "Cure of Ars".

== Beatification ==
The beatification process opened in Milan after Archbishop Paolo Angelo Ballerini inaugurated the diocesan process in 1864 and later closed it in 1867; the cause remained inactive due to situations in Milan despite attempts to revitalize it. It was eventually reopened on 24 November 1951. Theologians later approved all of Morazzone's spiritual writings on 24 May 1958, and the Congregation for the Causes of Saints later validated the informative process on 29 January 1993. Historians approved the cause on 15 December 1998, while the postulator later submitted the Positio to the C.C.S. in 1999; theologians approved it on 20 April 2007, as did the C.C.S. on 20 November 2007. Morazzone was named as Venerable on 17 December 2007 after Pope Benedict XVI confirmed his life of heroic virtue.

The process for a miracle spanned from 24 May 2005 until 21 March 2006 and received validation on 9 June 2007. A medical board approved this on 29 October 2007, as did theologians on 15 January 2011 and the C.C.S. on 1 March 2011. Benedict XVI approved this miracle on 2 April 2011 and confirmed the beatification. Cardinal Angelo Amato presided over the beatification on 26 June 2011 outside of the Milanese Duomo.

The current postulator for this cause is Francesca Consolini.

== See also ==
- San Giovanni Battista church
