= Minor Basilica of San Nicolò, Lecco =

Coordinates: 45.8565°N 9.3885°E

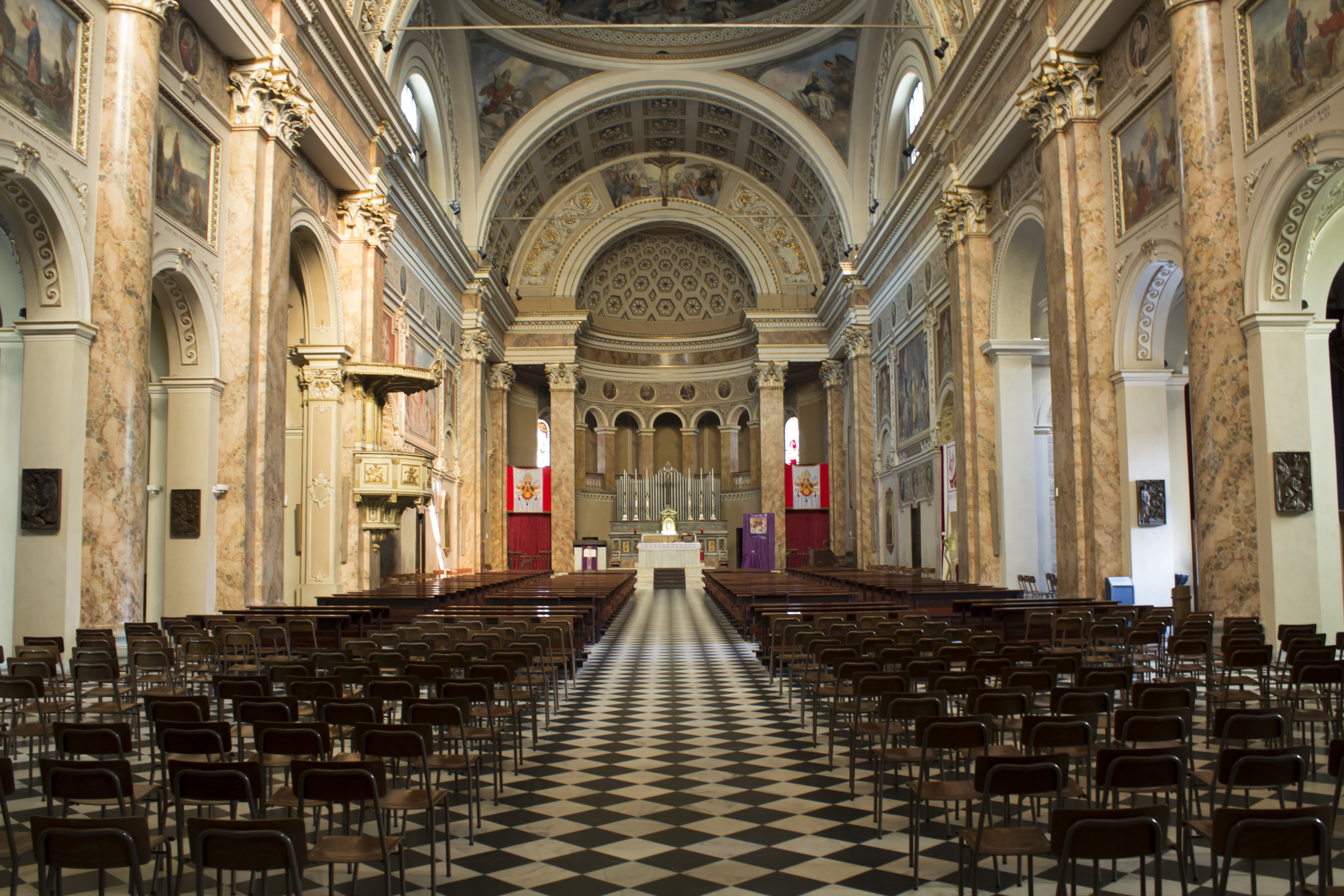
The interior

The Basilica of Saint Nicholas is the main place of Catholic worship in Lecco. It is situated in an elevated position and stands on the remains of the 14th century AD city walls. It was dedicated to San Nicolò, patron saint of sailors and boatmen. The symbol of the church is the very high bell tower, which, with its 96 m (315 ft) of height, represents one of the highest bell towers in Italy.

== Story ==
Originally a small structure of the 11th century, in the course of the 15th century it was repeatedly expanded. During the seventeenth century it saw a period of great splendor, when it assumed a decidedly Baroque style, both in structure and furnishings. Between 1831 and 1862, the architect Giuseppe Bovara altered the facade and decoration to the Neoclassical tastes. The imposing, neo-gothic bell-tower was added in 1902–1904, designed by Giovanni Ceruti. The bell tower was erected at the site of one of the turrets in the medieval walls of the city, razed during the 19th century. The double staircase entrance was added in 1928.

The church was elevated to Basilica status in 1942.

== Description ==
Preceded by a large churchyard, the Basilica of San Nicolò has a neoclassical façade facing the waters of the lake, with the pediment supported by six Corinthian columns.

The neoclassical facade is gabled, surmounted by a simple triangular pediment supported by six fluted Ionic pilasters. At the center of the facade opens the portal, with the sides, two on the right and two on the left, four semicircular niches.

The interior has three naves, one central and two lateral ones with perimeter chapels; the central nave is covered with a barrel vault and ends with a semicircular apse surrounded by an ambulatory with women's gallery and preceded by the dome with frescoes depicting the apparition of Our Lady of the Rosary to St. Pius V to announce the victory of Lepanto (1571). Inside the basilica, on the walls and on the vaults there are frescoes dating back to the 19th and 20th centuries, while the only original portion of the church is the chapel of the Baptistery, dating back to the 12th century. In addition, a number of frescoes including the Life of Jesus (1881) on the walls by Casimiro Radice and the Glory of the Madonna of the Rosary (1925) on the ceiling by Luigi Morgari. The fifth chapel on the right nave contains 14th-century frescoes and a 16th-century baptismal font.

Next to the Basilica stands the parish Oratory of St. Louis, which is still attended by many children, young people and families. The oratory also includes the chapel dedicated to the Immaculate Madonna.

== Artworks ==
- On the walls it is interesting to notice the frescoes of Giotto's school recovered after the restoration works of 1967–68, such as the Annunciation and the Deposition. More recent, instead, are the decorations of the nave representing ten panels with evangelical episodes by Casimiro Radice and 14 bronze panels representing the Via Crucis, by Enrico Manfrini.
- Chapel of the baptistery: it is the only remaining part of the original 13th century church. It contains a baptismal font dating back to 1596.
- Pipe organs: the Basilica has two pipe organs. The first is the main organ, on the choir loft on the counter-façade. Built in 1861 by the organ builder Giuseppe Bernasconi, it is a mechanical transmission organ. The second is the choral organ, positioned in the apse behind the high altar. It was built in 1974 by the Milanese organ-building firm Balbiani Vegezzi-Bossi and has an electric transmission.
- Statue dedicated to the patron saint of the city, which is celebrated on December 6: San Nicolò with the apples and the painting. Another statue of the saint, which characterizes the city is found in the lake near Punta Maddalena, the most exposed place on the coast of Lecco, in front of the monument dedicated to Antonio Stoppani.
