= Monte Coltignone =

Mountain in Italy

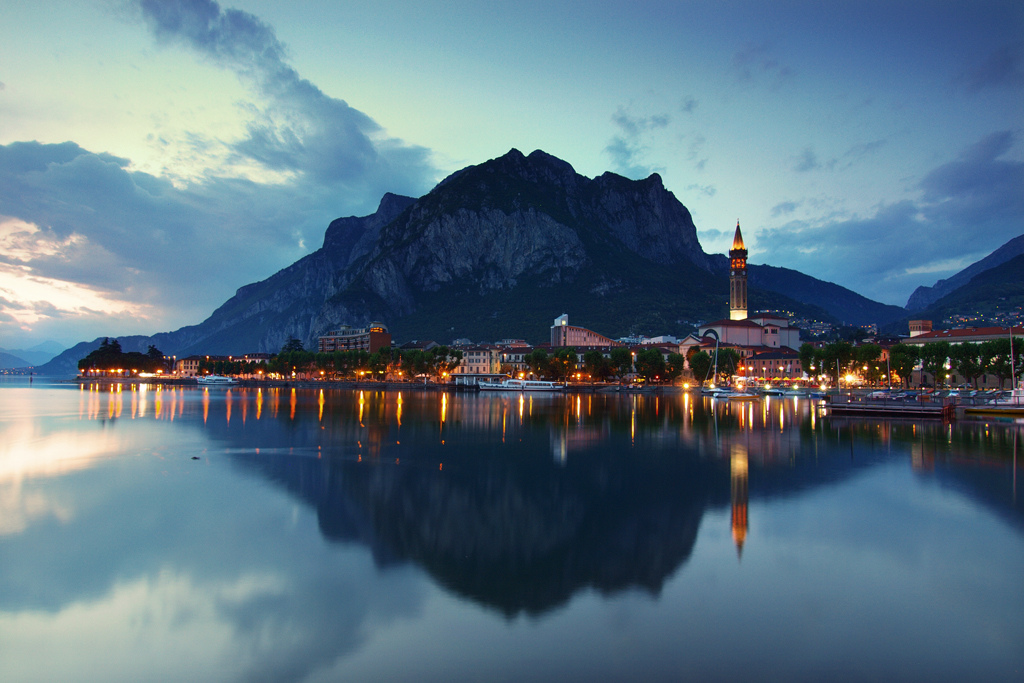
- Lecco at sunset, with the Coltignone in the background

Highest point
- Elevation: 1,479 m (4,852 ft)
- Prominence: 183 m (600 ft)
- Coordinates: 45°53′09″N 9°23′20″E

Geography
- Location within Lombardy
- Location: Lombardy, Italy
- Parent range: Orobic Alps

Monte Coltignone is a mountain of Lombardy, Italy, with an elevation of 1,479 metres (4,852 ft). It is located in the Orobic Alps, overlooking the town of Lecco.

== Details ==
It lies south of the Grignetta and Pian dei Resinelli, north of Monte San Martino, Corno Regismondo and Corno Medale, east of Lake Como and Pizzo Forcellino, and west of Ballabio and the Valsassina.

Coltignone is mostly made of limestone. Its peak can be reached by three hiking paths of varying levels of difficulty.
