= Santi Materno e Lucia, Lecco =

Church building in Lecco, Italy

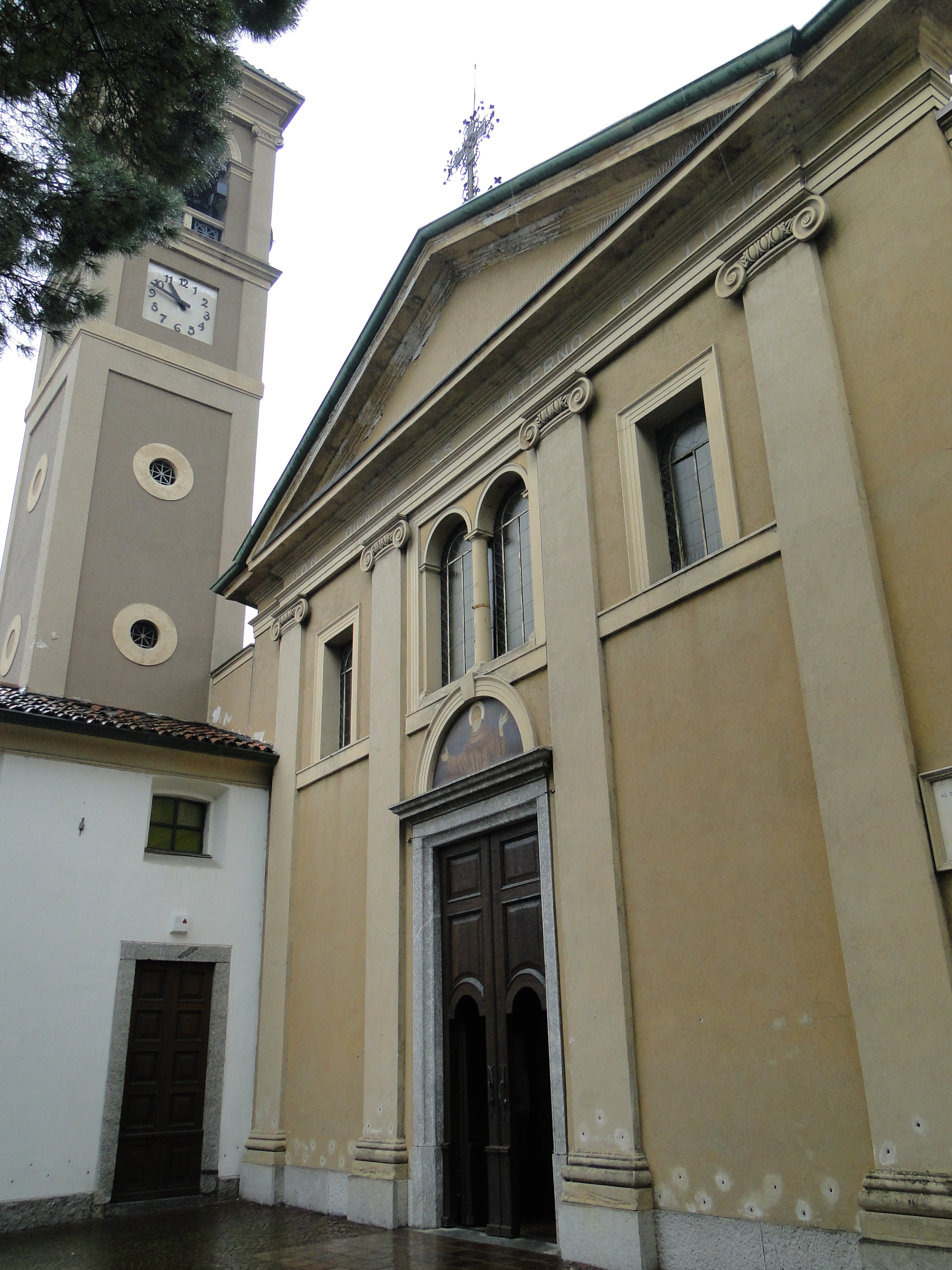

Santi Materno e Lucia is a Roman Catholic parish church and former Convente of the Cappuccini are located on Piazza San Cristoforo in the neighborhood of Pescarenico in the town of Lecco, region of Lombardy, Italy.

The church was originally dedicated to St Francis and commissioned, along with an adjacent Capuchin monastery, in 1576 by Cardinal Carlo Borromeo. It was consecrated in 1600. The monks remained in the monastery until expelled by the Napoleonic government in 1810. In 1824-1834, the church was refurbished by Giuseppe Bovara, and which led to a rededication to the two saints.

The interior ceiling was decorated with paintings in the early 19th century by Luigi Tagliaferri. on the right, an altarpiece houses a canvas depicting the Vision of the Holy Trinity before St Francis and St Gregory the Great; this is one of the masterworks by Giovanni Battista Crespi, also called il Cerano. The third chapel on the left has a late-baroque wooden statue of an Addolorata, and 9 wax panels depicting Franciscan Miracles attributed to an unknown Neapolitan artist.

The convent has had some reuse in this century by Franciscans. The Franciscan order of Capuchins are now re-established in the church and convent of San Francesco d'Assisi in the outskirts of town.
