= Santa Marta, Lecco =

Church in Lecco, Italy

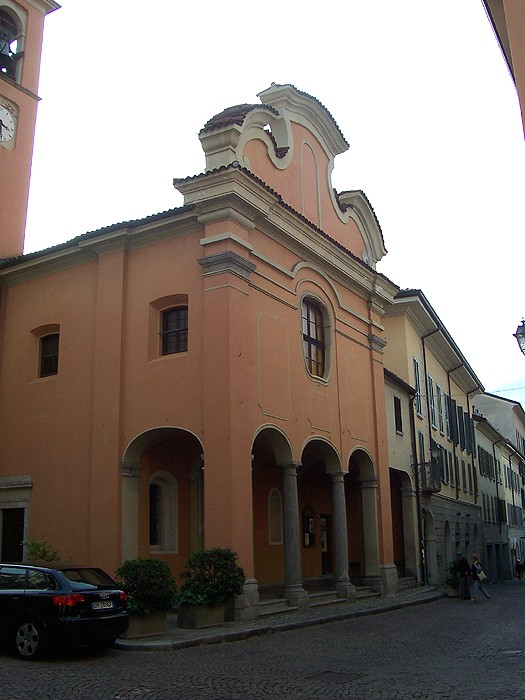

Santa Marta is a Roman Catholic church building located in the town of Lecco, region of Lombardy, Italy.

A church at the site was present by the 13th century, originally dedicated to St Calimero. In 1386, it housed the flagellant Confraternity of the Disciplini of St Marta, who added a hospice and rededicated the church. The church has been refurbished over the centuries. The facade dates to the 1720s.

The interior ceiling has a late 17th-century fresco, depicting the Glory of St Martha, by Giovanni Battista and Carlo Pozzo, and the church houses a 17th-century processional statue on the main altar of the Madonna of the Rosary and Child. The altar has 16th century marble sculpture busts of the apostles; the altar was refurbished in 1816 likely by Giuseppe Bovara. The lateral altars have statues of Santa Marta and San Antonio di Padova.
