= Lecco =

City in Lombardy, Italy

Lecco Lecch (Lombard)
- Comune
- Città di Lecco
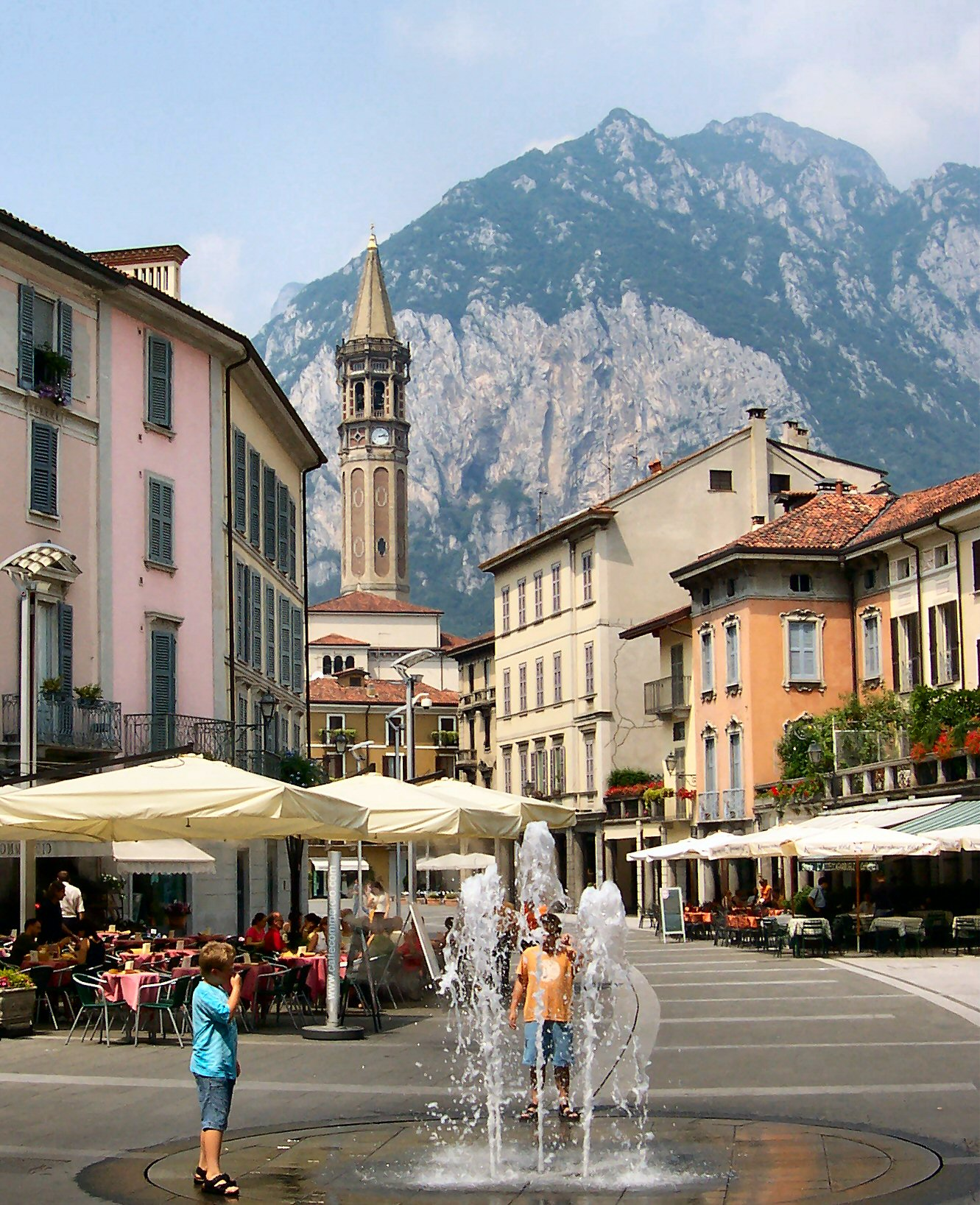
- Piazza XX Settembre, in the centre of the town, and the San Martino mountain

- Flag Coat of arms

- Location of Lecco in Italy Lecco (Lombardy)
- Coordinates: 45°51′N 09°24′E
- Country: Italy
- Region: Lombardy
- Province: Lecco (LC)
- Frazioni: Acquate, Belledo, Bonacina, Castello, Chiuso, Germanedo, Laorca, Lecco, Maggianico, Malavedo, Olate, Pescarenico, Rancio, San Giovanni, Santo Stefano

Government
  - Mayor: Filippo Boscagli (FdI)

Area
  - Total: 45.14 km^{2} (17.43 sq mi)
- Elevation: 214 m (702 ft)

Population (31 December 2021)
  - Total: 46,831
  - Density: 1,037/km^{2} (2,687/sq mi)
- Demonym: Lecchesi
- Time zone: UTC+1 (CET)
  - Summer (DST): UTC+2 (CEST)
- Postal code: 23900
- Dialing code: 0341
- ISTAT code: 097042
- Patron saint: San Nicolò
- Saint day: December 6
- Website: www.comune.lecco.it

Lecco (US: /ˈlɛkoʊ, ˈleɪkoʊ/ LEK-oh, LAY-koh, Italian: [ˈlekko], locally [ˈlɛkko]; Lecchese: Lecch [ˈlɛk]) is a city of 46,831 inhabitants in Lombardy, Northern Italy, 50 kilometres (31 mi) north of Milan. It lies at the end of the south-eastern branch of Lake Como (the branch is named Branch of Lecco / Ramo di Lecco). The Bergamo Alps rise to the north and east, cut through by the Valsassina of which Lecco marks the southern end.

The lake narrows to form the River Adda, so bridges were built there to improve road communications with Como and Milan. There are four bridges crossing the river Adda in Lecco: the Azzone Visconti Bridge (1336–1338), the Kennedy Bridge (1956), the Alessandro Manzoni Bridge (1985), and a railroad bridge.

Lecco obtained the title of city on 22 June 1848, and was elevated to province by decree of the President of the Republic of 6 March 1992.

Known for being the place where the writer Alessandro Manzoni set The Betrothed, the city is located in one of the vortices of the Larian Triangle. It overlooks the eastern branch of Lake Como and is included in the Orobic Prealps, between the Grigne mountain chain and the Resegone.

As a strategic crossroads for Valtellina, Lecco assumed increasing importance during the Middle Ages when it was annexed to the Duchy of Milan following the Peace of Constance. During the second half of the 19th century, under the Austrian dominion, the city went through a particularly flourishing period during which palaces and arcades in neoclassical style were constructed. After the unification of Italy, Lecco established itself as one of the most important industrial centers of the nation thanks to the development of the steel industries, which had been active since the 12th century. For this reason, Lecco is also called "the Iron city".

Lecco was named Alpine Town of the Year in 2013.

== Etymology ==
The origin of the toponym Lecco is not certain: it probably has a Celtic origin (Lech or Loch) words that mean lake. Shortly before the year 1000 B.C., some populations of Gauls and Celts migrated to the territory of Lecco for trade. "Leucos" was the name given by the Gauls who inhabited these areas until Romans transformed the denomination into Leucum under Julius Caesar's domination around 200 B.C.; so the hypothesis put forward by historians who have identified in Lecco the Roman city founded in 95 b.C. by Licinius Crassus in the Larian area with the name of Leucera was excluded.

== History ==
=== Celtic and Roman periods ===
In 1988, excavations of the Civic Museums of Lecco led to the discovery of a village of the Culture of Golasecca (first Iron Age) at the Rocca di Chiuso. The settlement of the Golasecchiani Celts in the area precedes the arrival of the Celts by more than 4 centuries.

In 2005, other excavations of the Civic Museums of Lecco and the University of Bergamo unearthed the oldest metallurgical production site in the entire Alpine arc (2nd century B.C. – 1st century B.C.) at piani d'Erna.

=== The Middle Ages ===
As the nodal point of several streets that put Lombardy in communication with the territories of Oltralpe, the region becomes the scene of clashes and decisive battles. The fortified system of Lecco (Castrum Leuci) became the seat, with the Carolingian, of an important Committee entrusted to the Attonid family. In 960, Lecco was submitted to the lordship of the Archbishop of Milan.

Throughout the Middle Ages and the Modern Age, the name of Lecco did not indicate an inhabited center but included the whole area between the lake and Valsassina. Lecco was a polycentric settlement, in which the various districts were closely interdependent, each with functional and economic specialization.

=== The Municipal and Viscount period ===
In 1117, a ten-year war broke out pitting many villages of the lakes of Como and Lugano against Milan, of which Lecco was an ally. The inhabitants of Lecco took part in the battle and in March 1125, Como had to capitulate and the victors set it on fire.

Later, Lecco became involved in the struggles between the powerful Milanese families Visconti and Torriani (the owners of the Valsassina territories). In 1296, the struggles led Matthew I Visconti to destroy the village giving orders that it would never rise again. Despite the destruction, Lecco was rebuilt and reconquered by Azzone Visconti. Throughout the period the community of Lecco, which included the entire current municipal territory, evolved as a free municipality with its statutes and, until 1757, was de facto a small autonomous state (with its own civil and criminal law), but inserted in the largest Duchy of Milan.

=== Spanish domination ===
With the fall of the Duchy of Milan, Lecco passed to Spanish dominium and, under Charles V, was transformed into a military stronghold. In this period, it suffered, as all Milanese territory, from plagues and famines, which Manzoni admirably described in The Betrothed. In 1714, Lombardy passed to the control of Habsburgs of Austria.

=== Austrian domination ===
In 1784, Joseph II of Austria visited the city and decided to destroy the walls. With the descent of Napoleon and the birth of the Cisalpine Republic in 1797, the Riviera di Lecco is part of the ephemeral Mountain Department. In 1799, Russian and French troops fought here during the War of the Second Coalition. In 1814, after the final defeat of Napoleon, the Austrian army regained possession of the region and permanently brought Lecco back to the province of Como in 1816 (from which it will become independent only in 1995) and definitively divides the city into many small municipalities that will be re-established in 1923, during the Fascist 20th anniversary.

In the period of the Kingdom of Lombardy-Veneto, Lecco experienced positive effects: numerous interventions of modernization and development of the territory, such as the introduction of an efficient bureaucracy, the increase of the cadastre and industrial development that led to widespread well-being.

=== From Risorgimento to the post-war periods ===
In the 19th century, Lecco became one of the beating hearts of Italian culture: the Scapigliati, a famous group of Milanese writers made Maggianico one of their favorite meeting places. The cultural ferment of the period was also associated with political ferment, and Lecco and its inhabitants played a very important role in the Lombard Risorgimento.

When the Milanese insurrection against Austria started in March 1848, a priest, Don Antonio Mascari, incited rebellion from the pulpit, but the insurrection that took place on the night between 18th and March 19 was unsuccessful. By decree of 22 June 1848, the provisional government of Lombardy (the Austrian government had lapsed following the Five Days of Milan insurrection) promoted Lecco to the rank of City, thanks to the contribution that the city was making to the Cause of Risorgimento. However, Lecco was again downgraded to Borgo in 1859.

In 1859, with the Second War of Independence, Lecco and Lombardy were conquered by the Kingdom of Sardinia and, in the same year, it re-entered the title of City.

In 1923, the municipal territory, which has now become insufficient to contain urban expansion, was greatly expanded with the aggregation of the neighboring municipalities of Acquate, Castello Sopra Lecco, Germanedo, Laorca, Rancio di Lecco and San Giovanni alla Castagna, as well as part of the municipal territory of Maggianico; in 1928, the remaining part of Maggianico was also aggregated.

== Climate ==
Lecco is the northernmost city (urban area) in Italy with a humid subtropical climate (Cfa defined by Köppen), only slightly softer than Milan. Despite being in a parallel dominated by a humid continental climate (Dfb), the territory is well sheltered from the mountain ranges, and from the climatic point of view, enjoys the beneficial influences of the lake's waters and the breath of the Tivano that blows from the Valtellina from the northeast all year round in the early hours of the morning. Its absence indicates bad weather. Breva is another wind that runs towards the lake, from the south to the north and indicator of good weather.

Climate data for Lecco (2004–2017)
Month	Jan	Feb	Mar	Apr	May	Jun	Jul	Aug	Sep	Oct	Nov	Dec	Year
Mean daily maximum °C (°F)	8.3 (46.9)	9.7 (49.5)	14.7 (58.5)	19.0 (66.2)	23.0 (73.4)	27.6 (81.7)	30.2 (86.4)	29.3 (84.7)	24.6 (76.3)	18.8 (65.8)	12.9 (55.2)	9.2 (48.6)	18.9 (66.1)
Daily mean °C (°F)	4.5 (40.1)	5.6 (42.1)	9.8 (49.6)	13.9 (57.0)	17.6 (63.7)	22.0 (71.6)	24.3 (75.7)	23.6 (74.5)	19.6 (67.3)	14.6 (58.3)	9.2 (48.6)	5.4 (41.7)	14.2 (57.5)
Mean daily minimum °C (°F)	0.6 (33.1)	1.4 (34.5)	4.8 (40.6)	8.8 (47.8)	12.2 (54.0)	16.4 (61.5)	18.4 (65.1)	18.0 (64.4)	14.6 (58.3)	10.5 (50.9)	5.6 (42.1)	1.7 (35.1)	9.4 (48.9)
Average precipitation mm (inches)	71 (2.8)	64 (2.5)	83 (3.3)	89 (3.5)	127 (5.0)	113 (4.4)	110 (4.3)	129 (5.1)	94 (3.7)	109 (4.3)	111 (4.4)	56 (2.2)	1,156 (45.5)
Average precipitation days (≥ 1.0 mm)	6	6	7	11	11	11	10	11	9	9	8	6	105
Average relative humidity (%)	75	75	68	71	69	67	67	68	71	75	78	79	72
Source 1: Climi e viaggi
Source 2: Il Meteo (precipitation and humidity)

== Geography ==
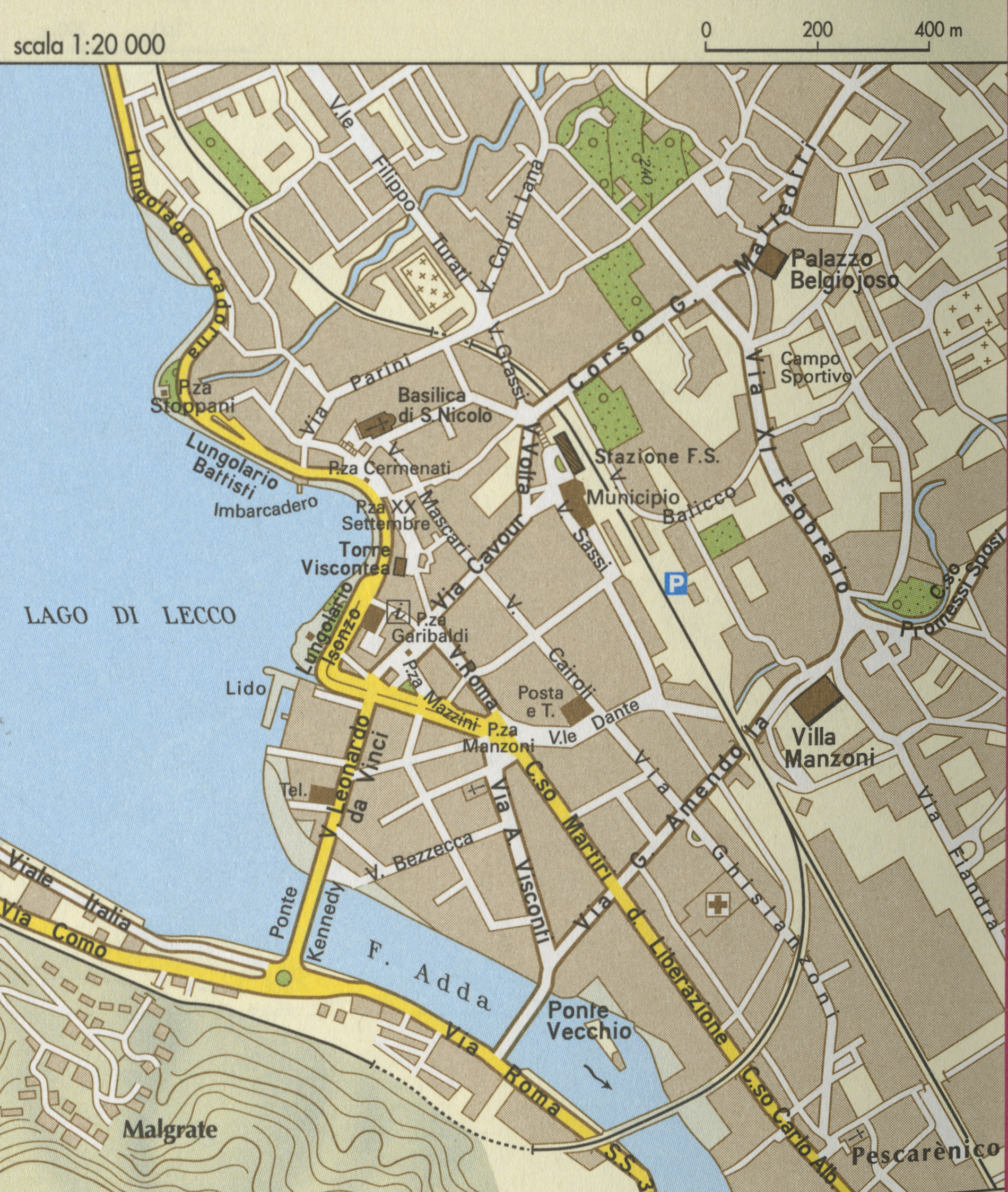
Map of Lecco city centre

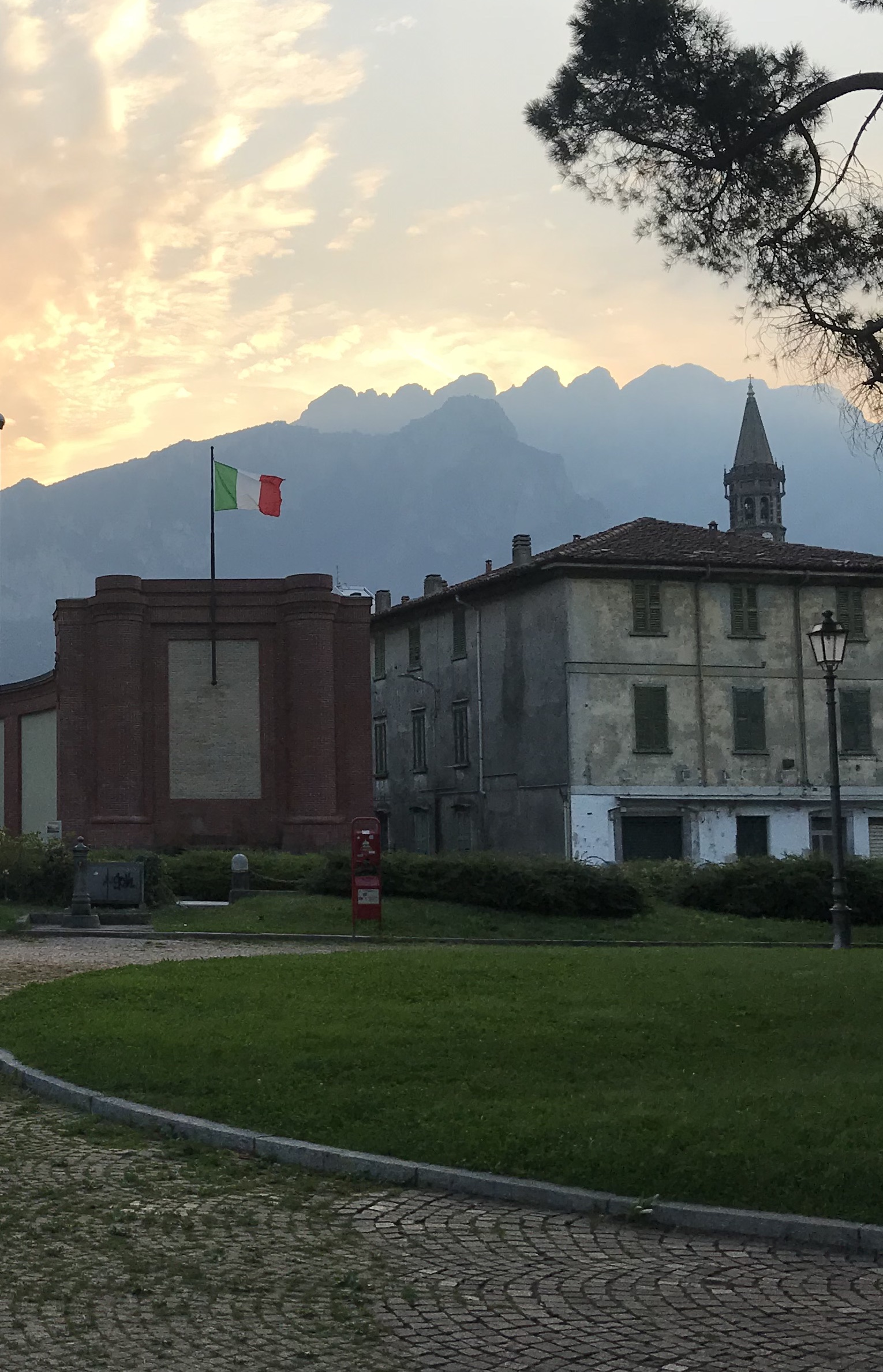
Resegone Mount seen from Lecco City

«That branch of the Lake of Como, which turns toward the south between two unbroken chains of mountains, presenting to the eye a succession of bays and gulfs, formed by their jutting and retiring ridges, suddenly contracts itself between a headland to the right and an extended sloping bank on the left, and assumes the flow and appearance of a river.»

The municipal territory covers an area of about 45.93 km^{2} (17.73 sq mi). It is located in a wide valley bordered by the Prealps to the east and Lake Lario to the west, at the point where Lake Lario ends and the Adda river resumes its course and then re-expands into Lake Garlate. The territory is crossed by three main streams: the Gerenzone, the Calderone and the Bione. The mountains that surround the natural, wide valley are: to the north Monte Coltignone and San Martino, to the east mount Due Mani, Pizzo d'Erna and Resegone, to the south the Magnodeno, to the west, on the right bank of the Adda River, is Mount Barro. On the Adda river, near the Azzone Visconti bridge, there is the small Viscontea Island.

The territory has a very variable altitude distribution: it ranges from 198 metres (650 ft) above sea level in the lake area to the maximum altitude of 1,875 metres (6,152 ft) above the sea level of Mount Resegone and this condition offers the city three different areas characterized by different morphologic and climatic characteristics.

The hydrography consists mainly of the stretch of the Adda river leaving the eastern branch of Lake Como and a series of streams, with their tributaries, which originate in the mountain range.

Lecco is delimited, to the north rises the massif of Monte Coltignone, mainly of limestone and dolomia of Esino, directly overlooking the lower peaks, such as Monte San Martino (Lecco), Monte Melma, and Monte Albano. To the east, the Resegone group, which, with its 1875 meters above the level of the sea, dominates the city characterizing the Lombard landscape up to Milan. Resegone is so named because of its multiple rocky teeth that, seen from the town, make it resemble a saw of gigantic size; Monte Serada dominates imposingly with its offshoots, which are the Piani d'Erna and the Pian Serada. To the southeast, beyond Maggianico, the greatest elevation is represented by the Magnodeno. To the west, there are the hills of north-eastern Brianza, among which stands out Mount Barro in which a regional park was established to protect local flora and fauna.

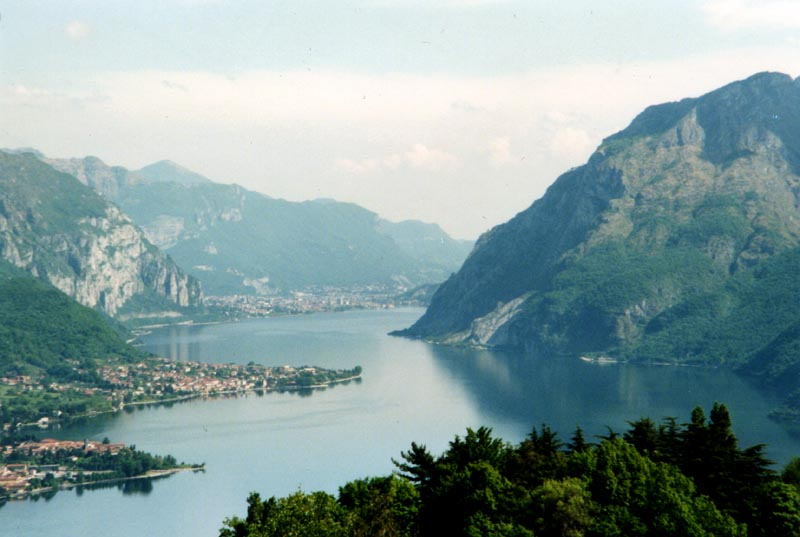
Aerial view of Lake Lecco

== Architecture ==
=== Religious architecture ===
- Minor Basilica of San Nicolò
- Santa Marta, Lecco
- San Giovanni Battista
- Santi Materno e Lucia
- San Francesco d'Assisi
- Santi Gervasio e Protasio
- Chiesa di Castello
- San Giuseppe al Caleotto
- Madonna della Rovinata
- Santuario di Nostra Signora della Vittoria
- Santa Maria Gloriosa
- San Giuseppe al Caleotto

=== Secular architecture ===
- Palazzo delle Paure
- Ponte Azzone Visconti (commonly known as Ponte Vecchio)
- Villa Manzoni
- Memoriale ai Caduti
- Statua del Manzoni
- Monuments to Mario Cermenati and to Giuseppe Garibaldi

== Traditions and folklore ==
Traditional dresses

The traditional women's dress in Lecco was linked to the image of Lucia of The Betrothed and is characterized by the ray of silver pins, called guazze, which crown the head.

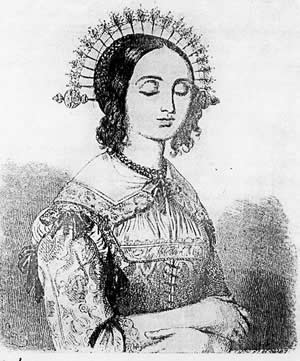
The traditional women's headgear was characterized by the beautiful ray of silver pins, called guazze, which crown the head. In this picture, Lucia Mondella from The Betrothed (Manzoni) wears it.

Manzoni procession

Although discontinuously organized, the tradition of the parade of floats inspired by the episodes of the novel is well-rooted in the territory.

The first edition took place in 1923, on the fiftieth anniversary of Manzoni's death. The procession was re-proposed in 1933, 1955, 1965, 2004, and October 2005, during the celebrations of the Festa di Lecco with 11 stage performances curated by 150 actors of the Teatro tascabile in Bergamo, along the old town center.

Carnevalone of Lecco

In February, since 1884 (edition n° 136 in 2020), on the occasion of the "Carnevalone di Lecco", there is the usual coronation of King Resegone and Regina Grigna, where the Mayor hands them the keys to the city to initiate the carnival folklore, that reaches its peak, according to the Ambrosian rite the city follows, with the Fat Saturday day and the traditional procession of floats.

ResegUp

It is a trail running that usually takes place on the first Saturday of June. Established in 2010, it aims to retrace the ancient paths that lead from the historic center to the summit of Resegone, erased over the years due to the urbanization of the city.

Batej Regatta

It is the traditional regatta that takes place on the banks of the Adda river in July (variable date), on the occasion of the Palio delle contrade in Pescarenico. The boats are eight, each of them in different colors to represent the districts. The regatta is preceded by the regatta of the "Lucie", the boats typical of the lake, and different representations of historical uses and customs typical of the area.

Scigamatt Race

Born in the district of Acquate during the event of the Scigalott d'Or (the name derives from the Lecco dialects Cicala d'oro), the race was held during the odd years on an obstacle course of 4 km (2.5 mi) in a mixed asphalt and dirt road. The event is in remembrance of 6 June 1859, when the inhabitants of the district went to Lecco to cheer General Giuseppe Garibaldi, accompanying him during the march with songs similar to the cicadas.

== Manzoni's places ==
Manzoni's places are the places, or what remains of them, that served as an inspiration to the writer and mentioned in the novel The Betrothed. A historical-literary-tourist itinerary, among the few old parts of the city spared from the urban expansion linked to industrial development, was created. Some places are historical, such as the monastery of Fra Cristoforo in Pescarenico or the Azzone Visconti bridge, others are indicated by tradition, such as the alleged house of Lucia Mondella in the district of Olate, the tabernacle of the Bravi, the Palazzotto of Don Rodrigo, the house of the tailor in Chiuso, the Innominato's stronghold and Villa Manzoni in the Caleotto district (today the Manzonian Civic Museum), and the residence of Manzoni's family in which he lived his childhood, adolescence, and early youth as he wrote in the introduction of the novel Fermo and Lucia.

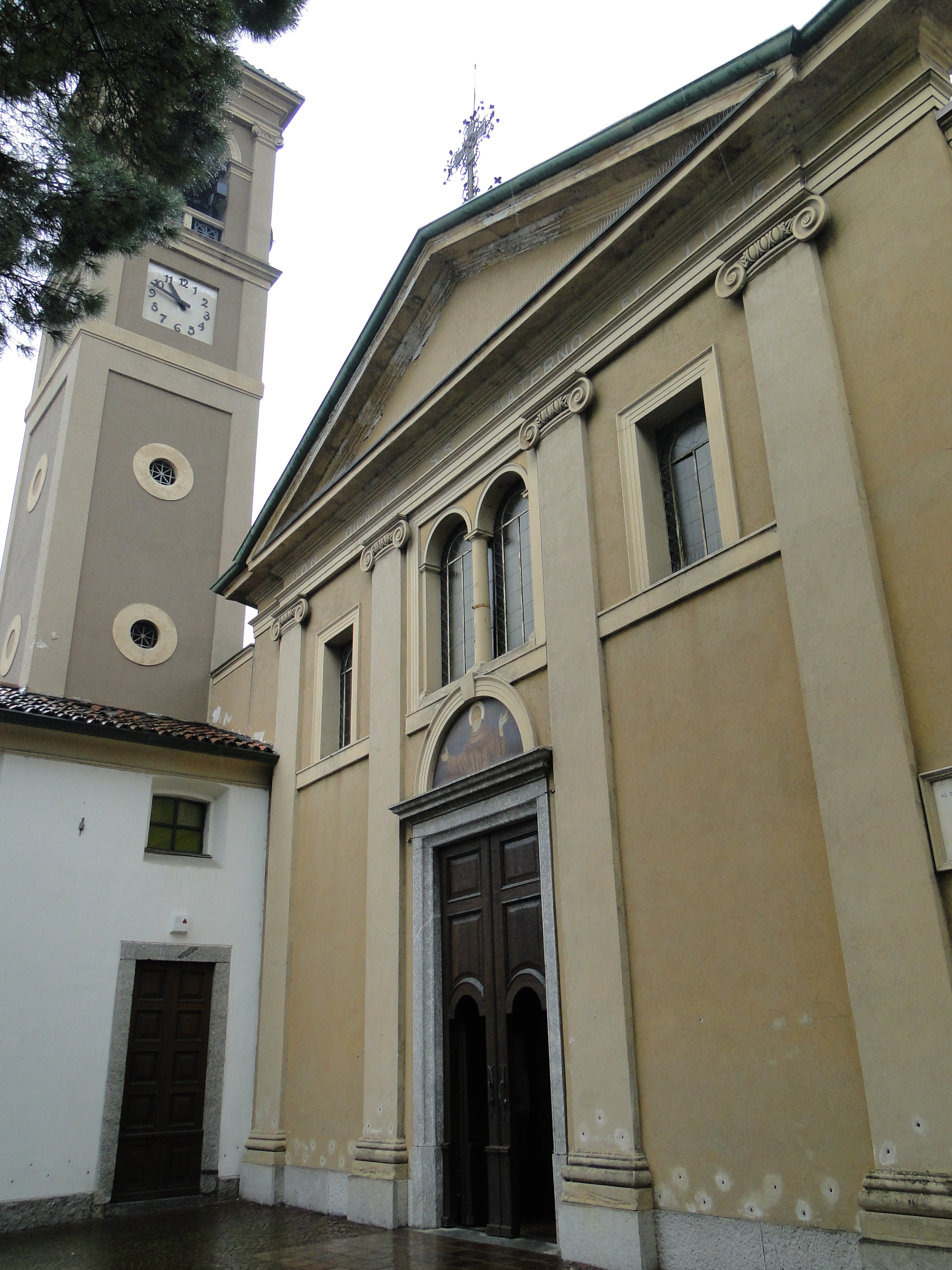
Church of Saints Lucia and Materno in Pescarenico

=== Convent of Fra Cristoforo ===
Situated in the district of Pescarenico, this church is now dedicated to Saints Lucia and Materno. In The Betrothed, Manzoni cites this place as the conventual seat of Fra Cristoforo.

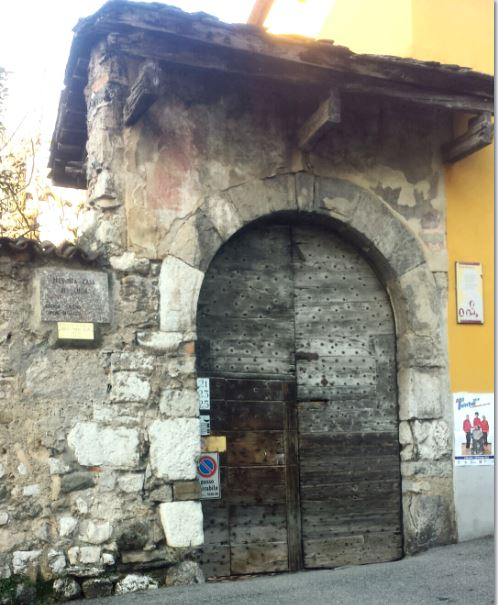
Alleged Lucia Mondella's house

=== Alleged Lucia Mondella's house ===
The alleged house of Lucia is located in Via Caldone 19 in the district of Olate (which at the time was separated from Lecco); designated by various scholars of manzonian topography as the village of the spouses, it is a typical example of the spontaneous architecture of Lecco. Through a portal decorated with a sixteenth-century Annunciation, you pass in the rustic courtyard, overlooked by an old tower, although it is not open to visitors as the house appears to be a private residence. The popular tradition points out another house of Lucia in Via Resegone, in the hamlet of Acquate, where there is an old inn, from whose courtyard you can clearly see the hill of Don Rodrigo's Palace.

=== Tabernacolo dei Bravi ===
It is a small chapel located on the side of the pedestrian Via Tonio and Gervaso, described by the literary tradition of Manzoni as the place of the famous stakeout of Don Abbondio by the Bravi to tell him the message of their lord Don Rodrigo.

=== Villa Manzoni ===
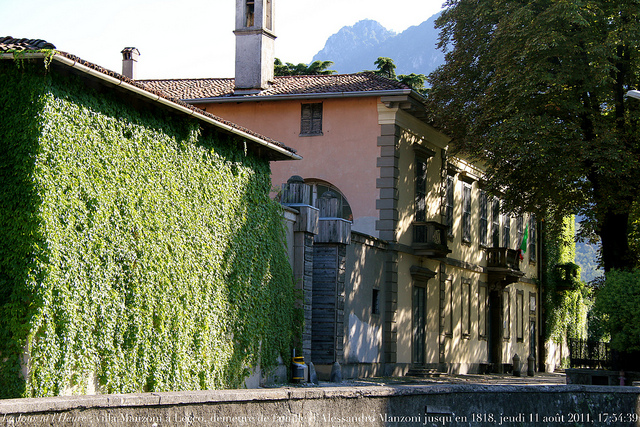
Villa Manzoni

The paternal residence of Alessandro Manzoni has a neoclassical style and it is located in the Caleotto district; it houses the Civic Museum of Manzoni and the Municipal Art Gallery. The building is considered the symbol of the link between Manzoni and the city of Lecco. The incipit of the novel comes from the meticulous visual memories of the landscape that the writer saw from this villa.

== Transport ==
=== Buses ===
Interurban bus services in Lecco were provided mainly by Servizi Automobilistici Lecchesi, until 2017, when the company merged into SAB Bergamo, creating Arriva Italia. Bus services to Como are provided by ASF Autolinee, while Flixbus caters for longer distance bus relations. Urban bus service is provided by Linee Lecco a public association owned 100% by Lecco's municipality.

The urban bus services in Lecco, managed by Linee Lecco, are the following:

- 1 Calolzio FS/Vercurago/Chiuso-Maggianico-Laorca
- 2 Ospedale-Parco Eremo (clockwise circular)
- 3 Parco Eremo-Ospedale (anticlockwise circular)
- 4 Gaggio-Parco Eremo-Ospedale-Cereda
- 5 Funivia-Parco Eremo-Ospedale-Via Montello/Villa Brick
- 6 Rivabella-Belledo
- 7 Calolzio FS-Vecurago-Chiuso-Maggianico-Ospedale-Parco Eremo-Laorca/Ballabio/Resinelli
- 8 Rancio-Germanedo
- 9 Lecco FS-Valmadrera
- 10 Lecco-Melgone-Onno-Vassena-Limonta-Visgnola-Bellagio
- 11 Calolzio FS-Lorentino-Erve
- 12 Calolzio FS/Carenno-Sopracornola
- 13 Calolzio FS-Marenzo-Torre de Busi-Sogno-Colle di Sogno

Interurban services departing from Lecco include:

- C40 Como-Erba-Lecco (ASF Autolinee)
- D20 Lecco-Mandello (Arriva Italia)
- D35 Lecco-Ballabio-Cremeno-Barzio-Taceno (Arriva Italia)
- D40 Vecurago-Calolzio FS-Bisone-Cisana (Arriva Italia)
- D50 Lecco-Pescate-Olginate-Calolzio-Olginate-Valgreghentino-Airuno FS-Brivio-Arlate-Imbersago-Merate/Cernusco/Lomagna (Arriva Italia)
- D55 Lecco-Pescate-Galbiate-Ello-Ravellino-Oggiono-Annione Brianza (Arriva Italia)
- D60 Lecco-Oggiono-Castello (Brianza)-Barzanò-Missaglia-Casatenovo-Carate Brianza-Seregno (Arriva Italia)
- E03 Celana-Caprino Bergamasco-Cisano FS-Brivio-Olgiate FS (Arriva Italia)

=== Rail ===
The municipality has two railway stations: Lecco, which is the town's main station; and Lecco Maggianico, which is the second main railway station, also housing a freight terminal in its premises. For both stations, the main operator is Trenord.

=== Navigation ===
Whilst in the past there was a much more frequent navigation service around Lake Como departing from Lecco, in recent years the town's pier was mainly used for seasonal services, pleasure boat rides and charter services.

=== Former modes of transport ===
Between 1927 and 1953, Lecco had its own urban tramway network, which was connected to the Como-Erba-Lecco interurban tramway, which operated between 1928 and 1955.

=== Cable Car ===
An aerial cable car operates between Versasio and Piani d'Erna, and was inaugurated in 1965.

=== Car ===
Despite not being located near any highway, Lecco is a strategic crossroads for road connections with neighboring provincial capitals. The city's main road is the State Road 36 of Lake Como and Spluga, which crosses the town via a dual-lane viaduct in each direction and a long tunnel of approximately 4,800 meters divided into two separate, overlapping tubes called San Martino, connecting the Lombardy capital to the Valtellina and Valchiavenna regions. It opened to traffic on October 25, 1999, after approximately twenty years of construction. The Lecco-Valsassina link road was opened in 2006; 11.7 km of road, almost entirely tunnel-based, connects the capital with the nearby town of Ballabio. Work is underway on a tunnel-based variant of the state road 639 to the Pusiano and Garlate lakes to streamline connections with Bergamo and the San Martino Valley.

The city is crossed by three bridges spanning the Adda River:

The Azzone Visconti Bridge (commonly known as the Ponte Vecchio, old bridge), inaugurated in 1338 The John Fitzgerald Kennedy Bridge (commonly known as the Ponte Nuovo, new bridge), inaugurated in 1955 The Alessandro Manzoni Bridge (commonly known as the Terzo Ponte, third bridge), inaugurated in 1985 A fourth bridge is currently under construction, parallel and adjacent to the Manzoni Bridge, to separate long-distance traffic on the SS 36 from local traffic. With a total length of 579 meters, the new viaduct was included in the construction plan for the 2026 Milan-Cortina Winter Olympic games.

Even though it has an impressive number of high-speed roads, Lecco's traffic still remains a common problem especially during rush hour when it isn't uncommon to have city-wide gridlocks

== Sport ==
The town's football team, Calcio Lecco 1912, was promoted to Serie B in 2023. Their traditional rivalry with the team of the city of Como is marked by the so-called "Derby del Lario", often surrounded by violence between fans, created by the local ultras group Cani Sciolti.

The main sports facility of the city is the Rigamonti-Ceppi Stadium, where the football team trains and plays. It was built in 1922, in honor of the football player Mario Rigamonti and the ex-president of the team Mario Ceppi. It can contain almost 5000 people.

Lecco has been on multiple occasions the finish place of the Giro di Lombardia cycling classic.

== Notable people ==
- Alessandro Manzoni (1785–1873), poet and novelist, author of The Betrothed, belonged to an old family of Lecco.
- Antonio Stoppani (1824–1891), geologist and palaeontologist.
- Antonio Ghislanzoni (1824–1893), journalist, poet, and novelist; he wrote many librettos for Verdi, including La forza del destino and Aida.
- Carlo Mauri (1930–1982), climber and explorer.
- Ermanno Fasoli (1943–2025), boxer.
- Walter de Silva (born 1951), automobile designer.
- Antonio Rossi (born 1968), canoeist and five-time Olympic medalist in kayak flatwater canoeing.
- Marco Bonanomi (born 1985), racing driver.
- Manuel Locatelli (born 1998), footballer who plays for Juventus and Italy.
- Baby Gang (born 2001), rapper.

== Cultural references ==
Alessandro Manzoni set the events in the first half of The Betrothed in Lecco, a town he knew deeply since he had spent part of his childhood there.

We voyaged by steamer down the Lago di Lecco, through wild mountain scenery, and by hamlets and villas, and disembarked at the town of Lecco. They said it was two hours, by carriage to the ancient city of Bergamo, and that we would arrive there in good season for the railway train. We got an open barouche and a wild, boisterous driver, and set out. It was delightful. We had a fast team and a perfectly smooth road. There were towering cliffs on our left, and the pretty Lago di Lecco on our right, and every now and then it rained on us.

Mark Twain, Innocents Abroad, chapter 21.

In 2022, Lecco native artist Baby Gang released the song "Lecco City", describing the hardships of growing up around crime in the Italian town.

Lecco has been proposed as the location depicted in the Mona Lisa by Leonardo da Vinci.

== International relations ==
=== Twin towns – Sister cities ===
Lecco is twinned with:

- Mâcon, France since 1973
- Overijse, Belgium since 1981
- Igualada, Spain since 1990
- Szombathely, Hungary since 1995
- Mytishchi, Russia since 2005

== Gallery ==
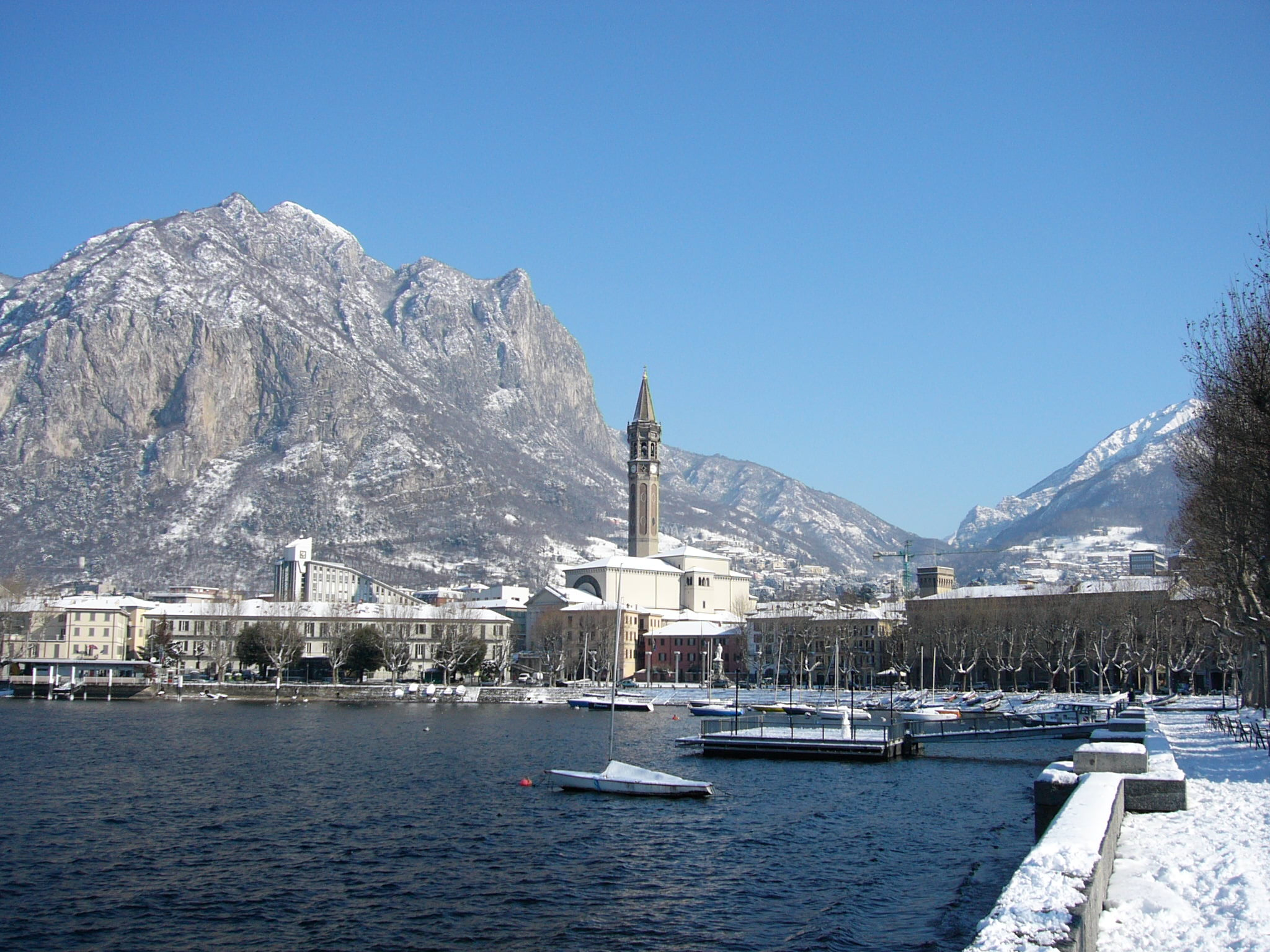
Lecco and Monte San Martino

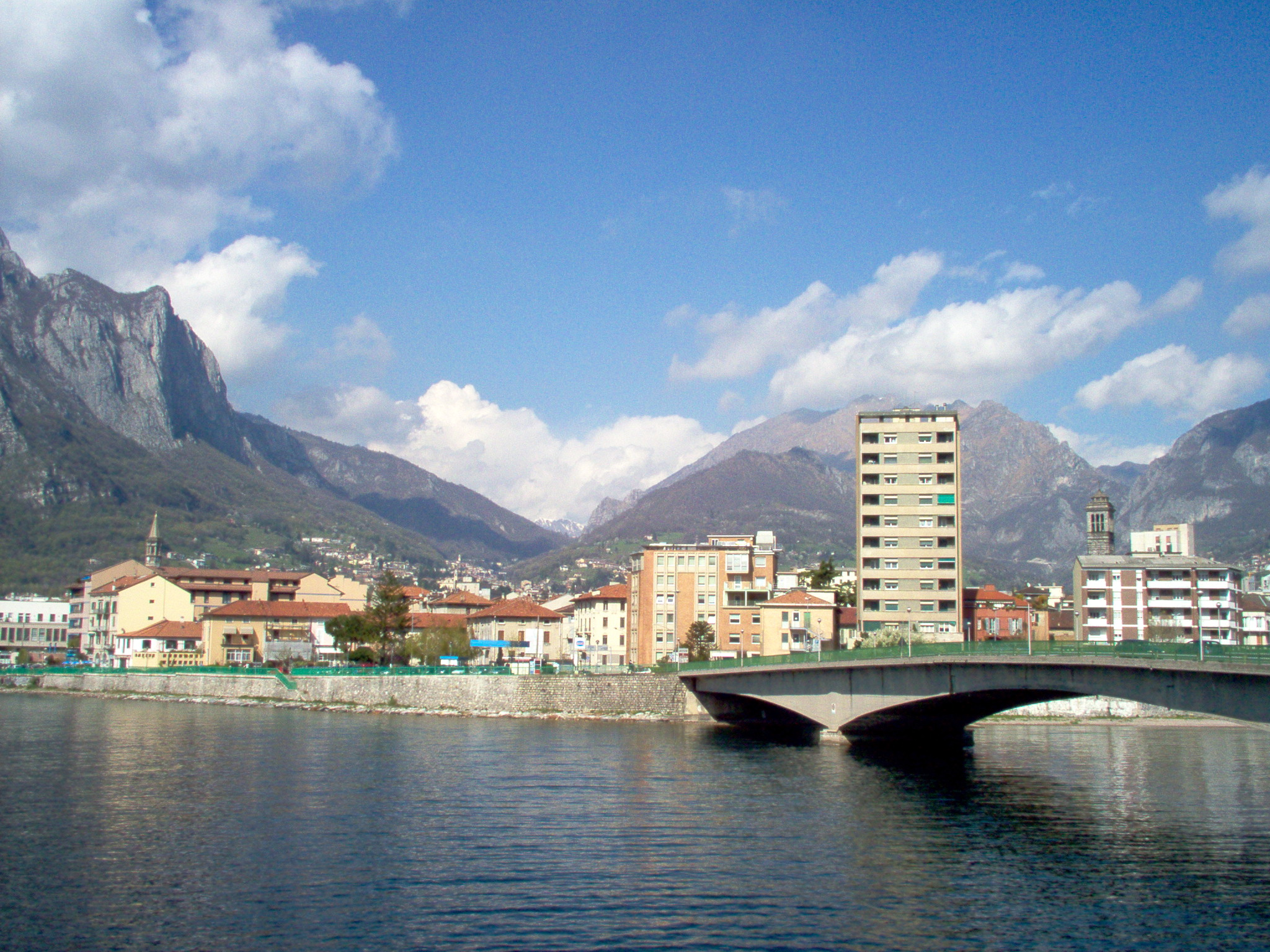
View of Lecco

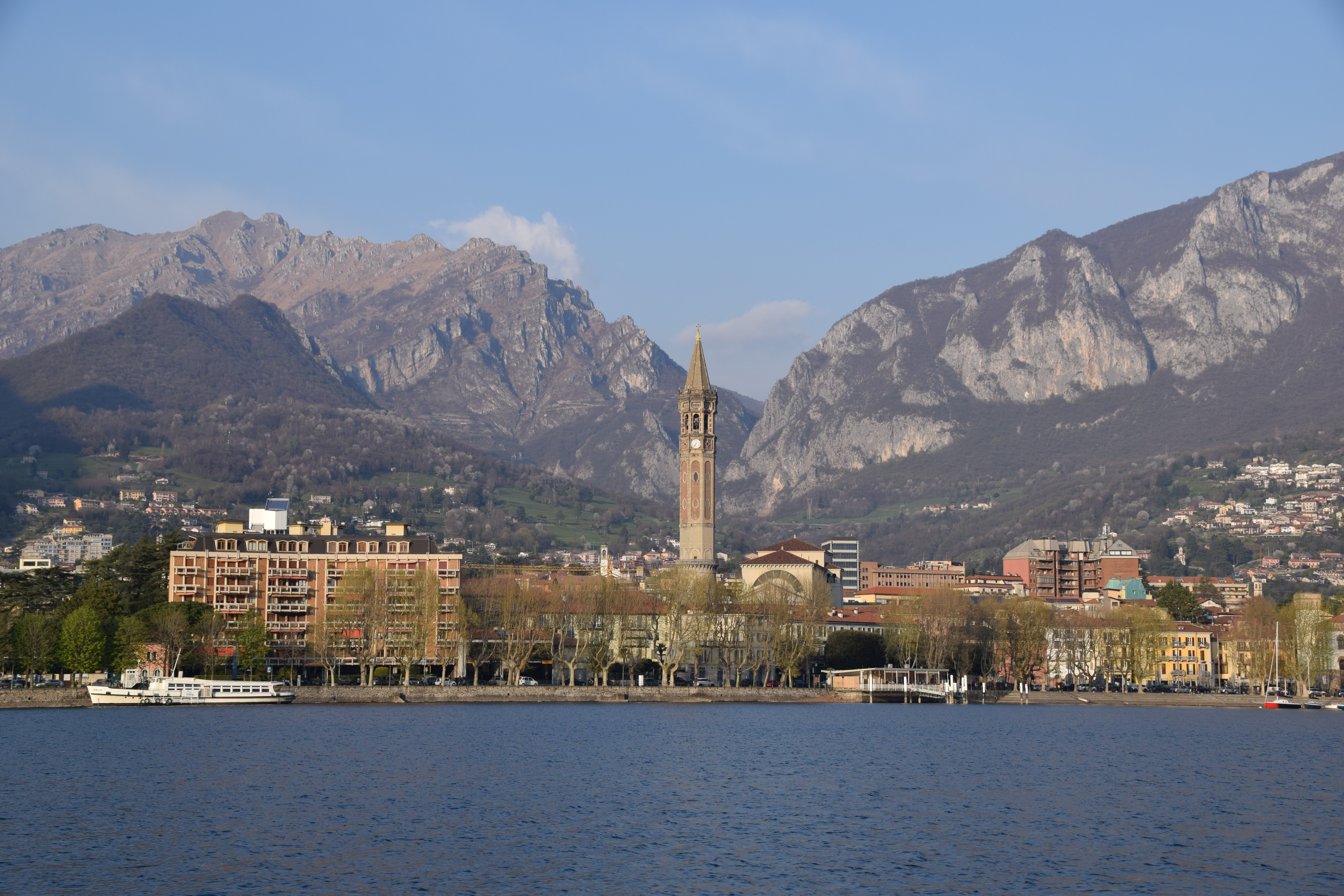
View of Lecco from Lake Como

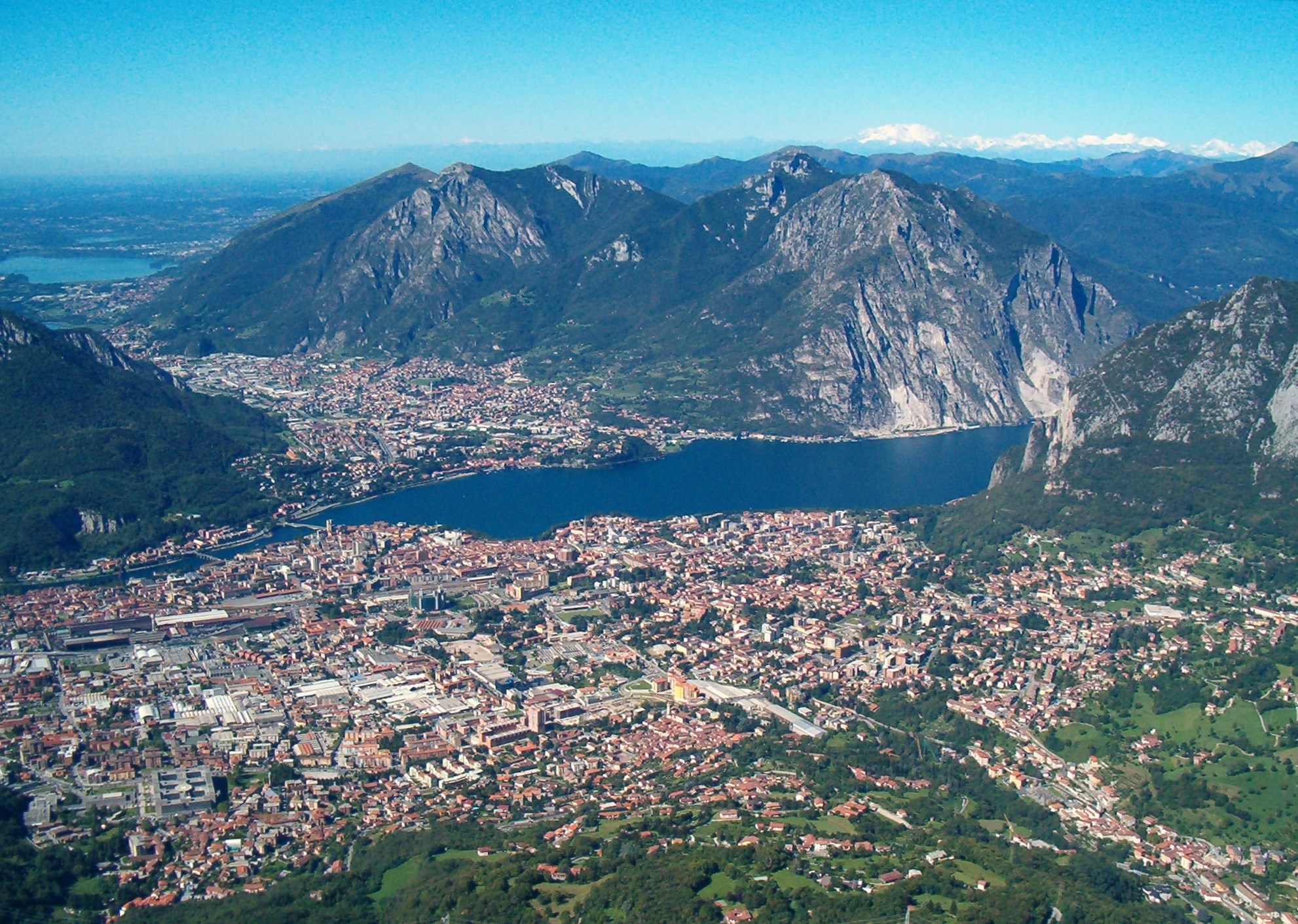
View of Lecco from Piani d'Erna

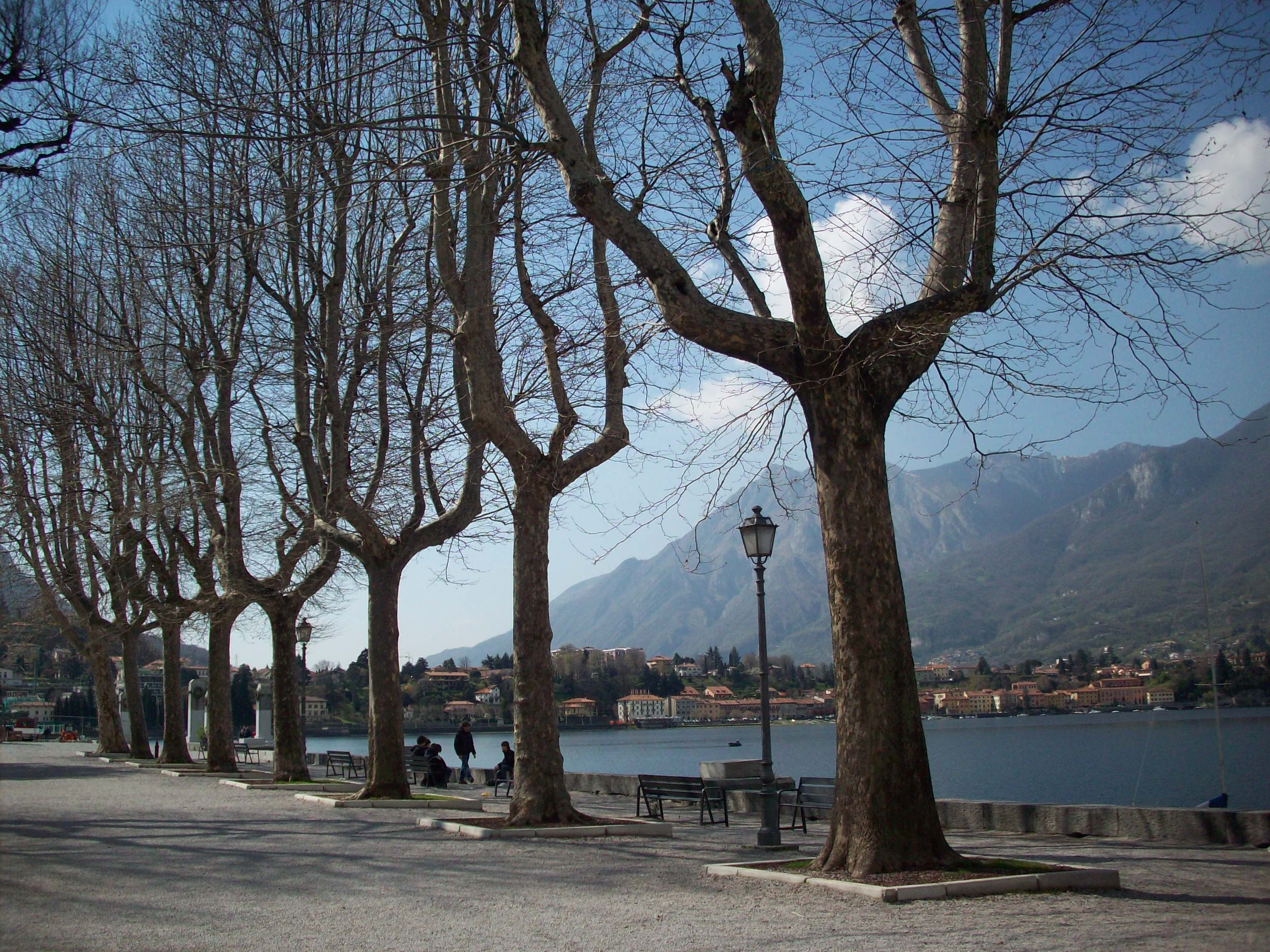
View of Lake Como from Lecco

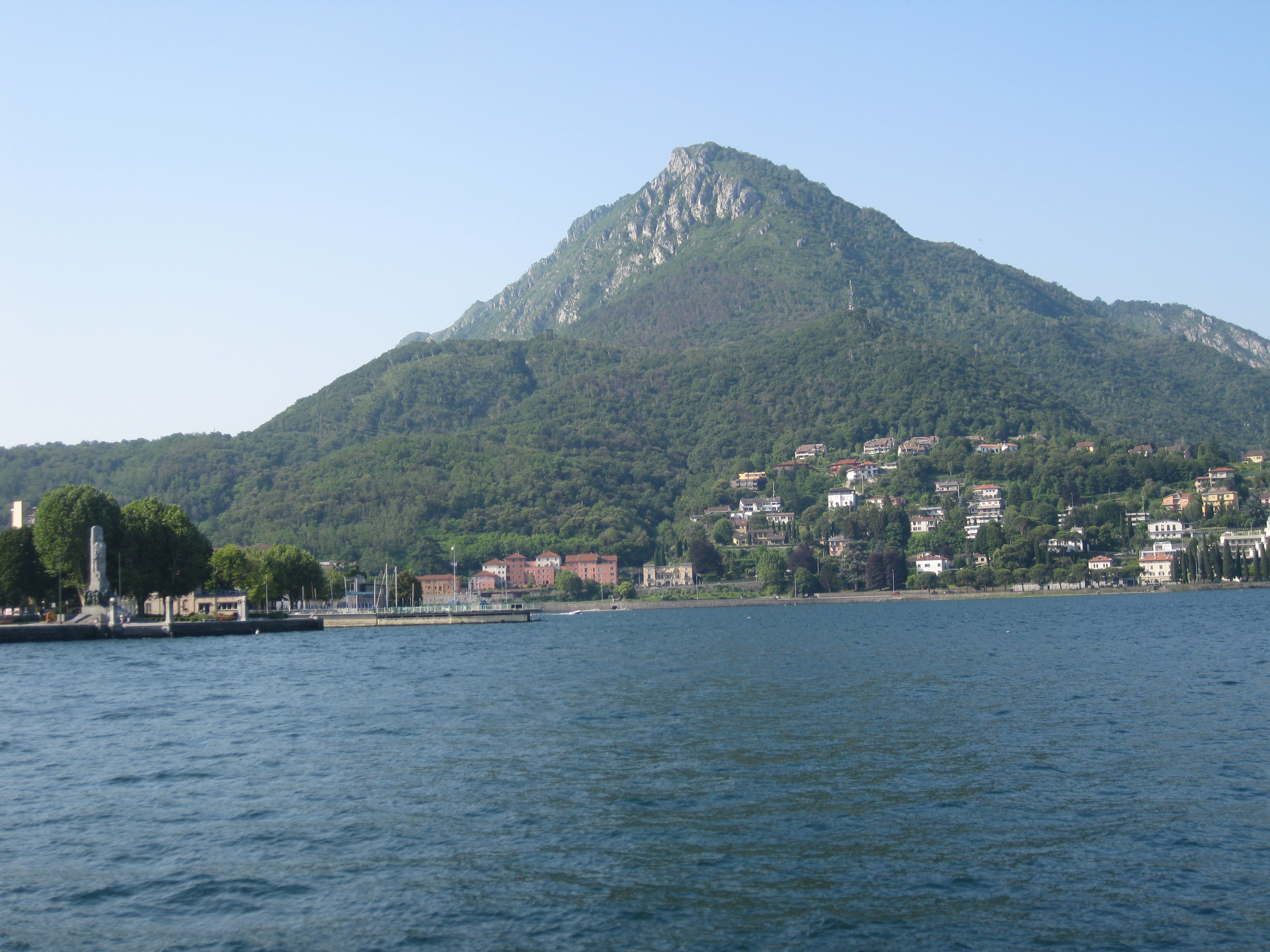
Panoramic view of the Lake

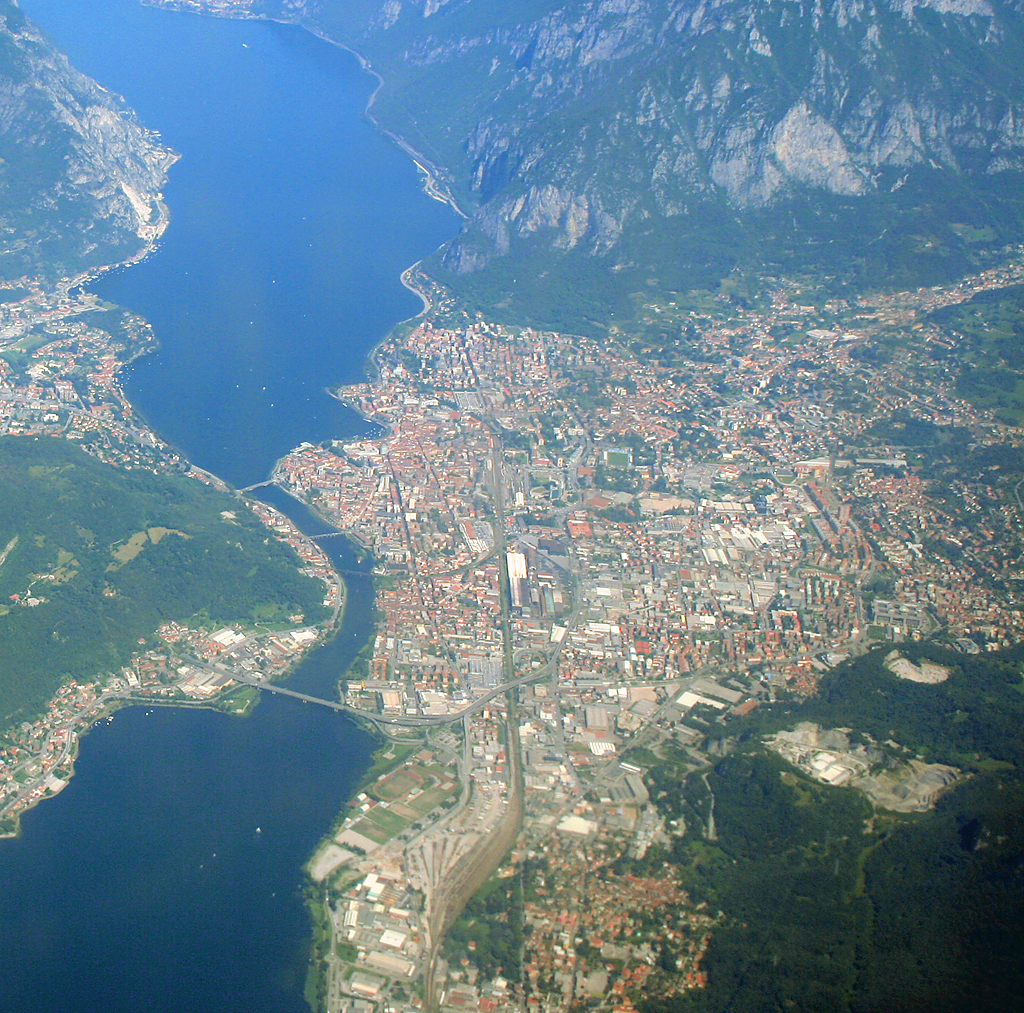
Lecco aerial view from the south

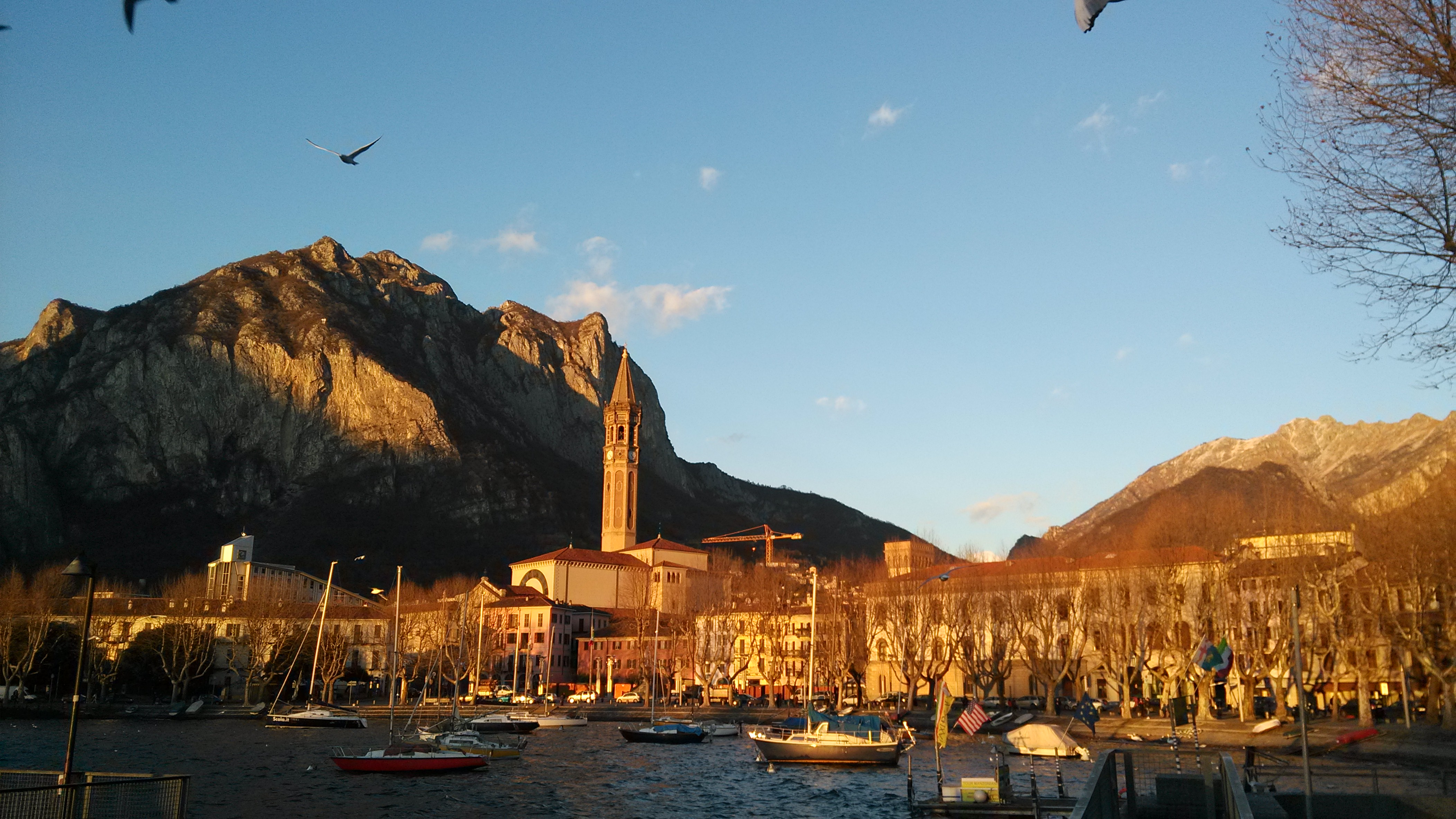
Lecco lake

== See also ==
- Lecco railway station
- Alpine Town of the Year 2013
