= Santa Maria Gloriosa, Lecco =

Roman Catholic church in Lombardy, Italy

Coordinates: 45°52′14.5″N 9°23′53.2″E

Sanctuary of Santa Maria Gloriosa
- Sanctuary of Santa Maria Gloriosa
- Location: Rancio Superiore, Lecco, Lombardy, Italy
- Country: Italy
- Denomination: Roman Catholic

History
- Status: Parish church

Architecture
- Functional status: Active
- Architect(s): Giuseppe Bovara (main altar, 1828)
- Style: Baroque (with earlier elements)

Administration
- Archdiocese: Milan
- Parish: Rancio Superiore

The Sanctuary of Santa Maria Gloriosa is a Roman Catholic parish church in the neighborhood of Rancio Superiore in the town limits of Lecco, region of Lombardy, Italy.

== History ==
A church at the site has been documented since 1455. In 1640, it became the parish church of Rancio. The present church and bell-tower were refurbished with their present layout and architecture in that century. The interior retains some of its late-baroque decorations, including a wooden statue of the Madonna and child, but also a 16th-century crucifix and a 15th-century icon of the Madonna Odigitria. The main altar with a tempietto and gilded angels was designed in 1828 by Giuseppe Bovara. In the 20th century, the walls and ceiling were frescoed, along with the altarpiece depicting the blessed Giovanni Battista Mazzucconi.

From the church, there is a striking view of the town.
