= San Giuseppe al Caleotto =

Church in Lecco, Lombardy, Italy

Coordinates: 45.8529°N 9.4022°E

The Church of San Giuseppe al Caleotto stands in Lecco, in the Caleotto district, at Via Baracca 4.

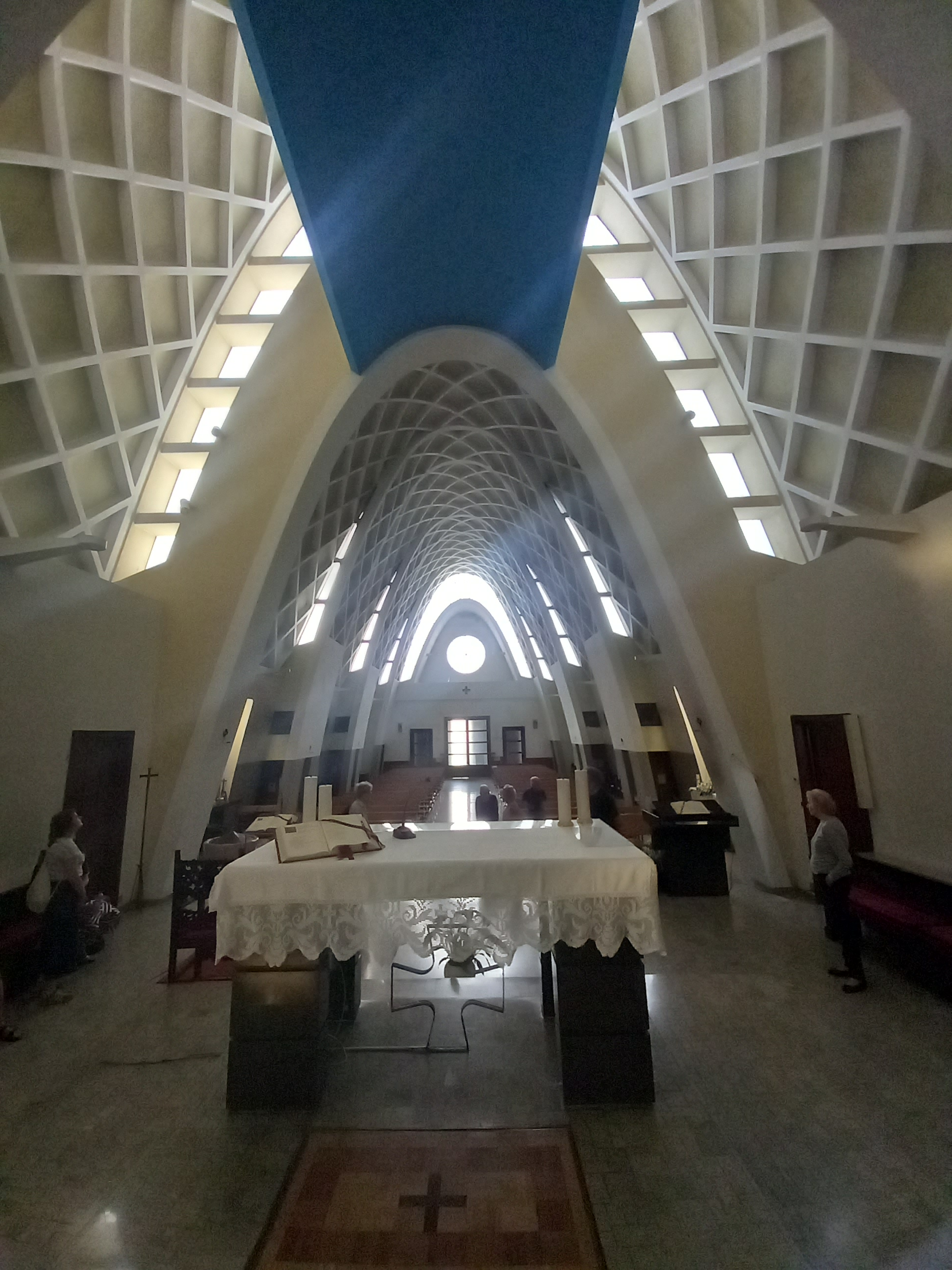
Inside of the church

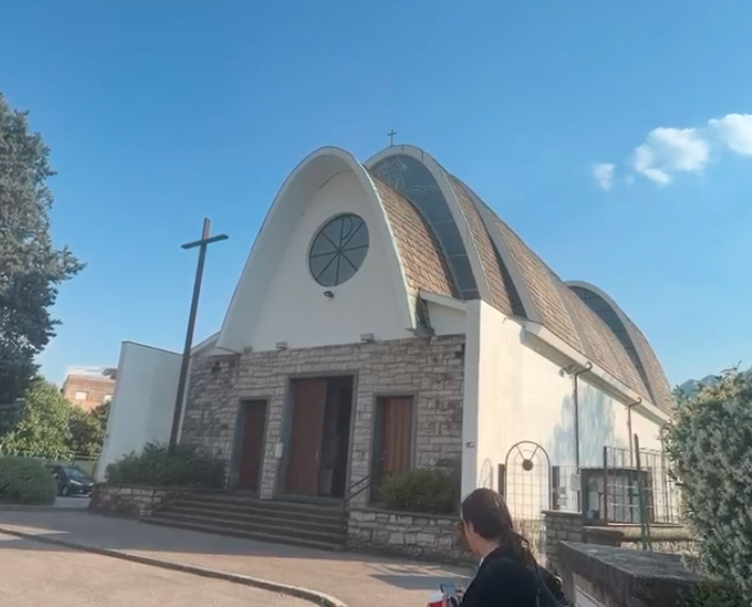
Church of San Giuseppe al Caleotto in Lecco

The structure is made of reinforced concrete, with a façade of stone and plaster, slate-shingle roofing, and metal window frames. Its shape recalls that of a tent, with several sections separated by glazed panels that allow light to enter the church.

It was designed in 1949–50 and built between 1950 and 1951. The project was by the architect Carlo Wilhelm and was inspired by ancient Romanesque churches. The church was frescoed by the painter Orlando Sora, who depicted virtues and vices, reward and punishment, in the triumphal arch and in two side chapels. The altar is built on four red marble pillars bearing the names of the Twelve Tribes of Israel in Hebrew and Italian.

The church was consecrated by Cardinal Angelo Scola on 18 March 2012, many years after its construction.

== Bibliography ==
- Rostagno C., TAL&A, Carlo Wilhelm. Architettura come essenza di vita, Como 2013, n. 42
- Lombardia Beni Culturali, Architettura in Lombardia dal 1945 ad oggi, Chiesa di S. Giuseppe al Caleotto
