= San Giovanni Battista, Lecco =

Church of Lecco, Italy

Coordinates: 45.818174°N 9.41912°E

San Giovanni Battista is a Roman Catholic church building located in the frazione of Chiuso of the town of Lecco, region of Lombardy, Italy. It is sometimes referred to as the Chiesa del Beato Serafino.

== History ==
The present church was built atop the foundations of an earlier 13th century. It underwent several refurbishments in the 17th century. The sacristy was built at this time. The church and town were often damaged by fighting at the frontier between the Duchy of Milan and the Republic of Venice. The present façade, the bell tower and the interior were last updated in the 19th century.

The apse has a 15th-century fresco cycle, depicting Christ Pantocrater and the Doctors and prophets of the Church above a Crucifixion, attributed to Giovan Pietro da Cemmo. Near this church is the parish church of Santa Maria Assunta noted by Alessandro Manzoni as the site of the Conversione dell'Innominato (Conversion of the Unnamed) in his novel of The Betrothed. The church of San Giovanni Battista has a small museum dedicated to the Blessed Serafino Morazzone, parish priest (1773–1822) and friend of Manzoni, also once mentioned in his novels. The museum has a fresco depicting the Conversion of the Unnamed by Casimiro Radice.
