= Laorca cemetery and church, Lecco =

Church and cemetery in Lecco, Lombardy, Italy

The Cemetery and Chapel of San Giovanni Battista, also known as the Cimitero di Laorca, is a Roman Catholic church and cemetery in the neighborhood of Loarca in the town limits of Lecco, region of Lombardy, Italy. The cemetery is located in a grotto under a stone mountainside.

== History ==
The site originally housed a series of Via Crucis chapels (1765), resembling those found in the Sacro Monti of Lombardy and Piedmont. An ossuary was added in 1649 to house the remains of those killed by the plague; after the first world war, it became a repository and memorial for those fallen in the conflict.

The site was refurbished during the 19th and 20th centuries. The painter Luigi Tagliaferri restored the Via Crucis. In 1985–1989, the painter Paolo Gerosa painted modern images for the chapel refurbished in a Neo-Romanesque style on the prior foundations. The grotto houses chapels dedicated to the Madonna of Lourdes and St John the Baptist (latter called Chiesa ai Morti). The latter chapel has a structure dating from 1289 erected to venerate a hermit named Giovanni who dwelt in the grotto in early medieval times.

The interior of the main church has frescoes from 1578 and a stucco arch in the apse from 1648. The cemetery has Art Nouveau monuments dedicated to Falck (1922), Redaelli (1903–1908), and Bolis (1914).
