= Azzone Visconti Bridge =

Medieval bridge in Lecco, Lombardy, Italy

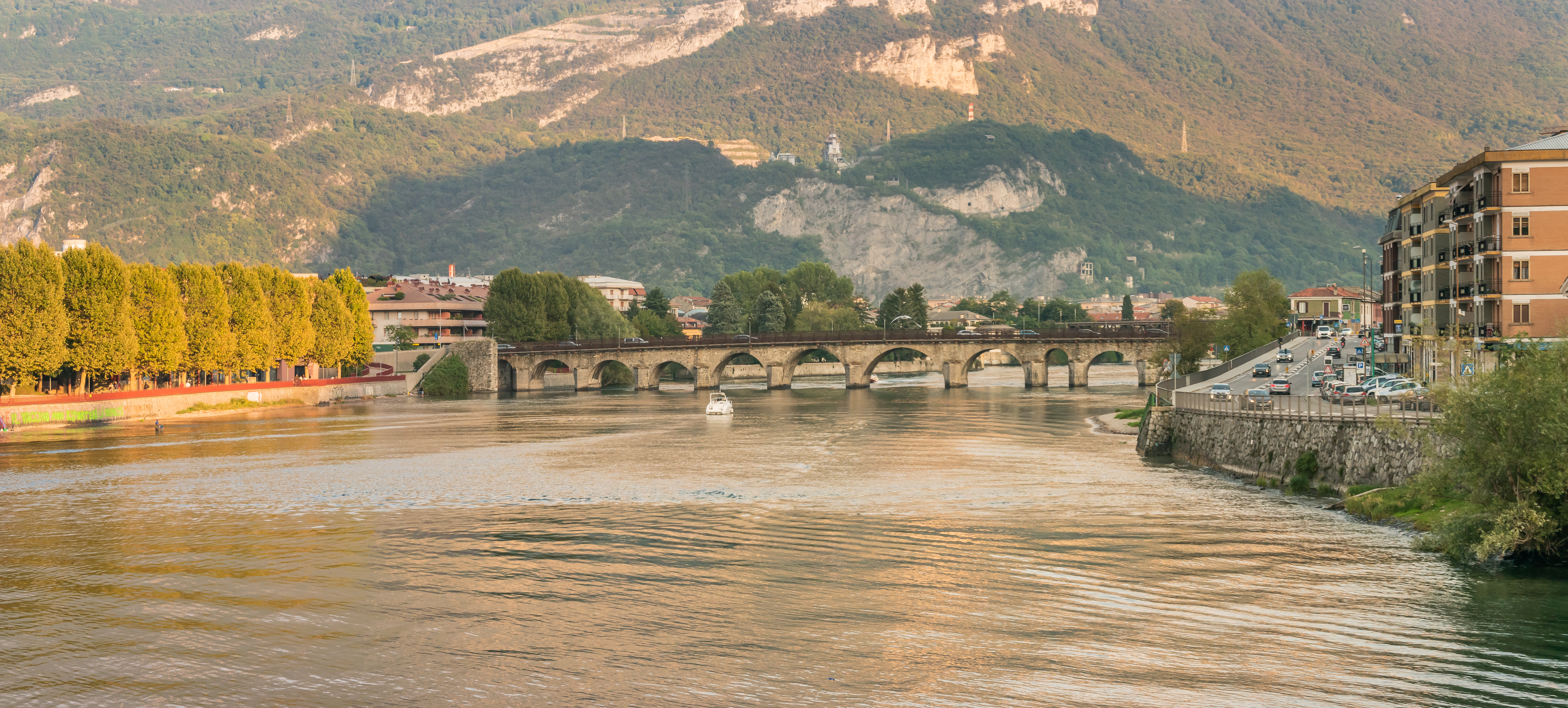
- Azzone Visconti Bridge seen from north
- Coordinates: 45°50′50″N 9°23′33″E
- Carries: Two-lane car road, one pedestrian lane
- Crosses: Adda River
- Locale: Lecco

Characteristics
- Design: Multi-span arch bridge
- Material: Stone
- Total length: 131 metres (430 ft)
- Width: 9.05 metres (29.7 ft)

History
- Designer: unknown
- Constructed by: Azzone Visconti
- Opened: 1338

The Azzone Visconti Bridge is a medieval bridge over the Adda River at Lecco in Lombardy, Italy. It was built by Azzone Visconti, Lord of Milan, in the first half of the 14th century to connect Lecco to the road leading to Milan. Initially, it had towers and drawbridges controlling the city's entrance. Over the following centuries, it underwent demolitions and restorations.

Today, the Azzone Visconti Bridge is open to two car lanes and continues to serve as a bridge connecting Lecco with the opposite bank of the Adda.

== History ==
In 1335, Lecco spontaneously submitted to the lordship of Azzone Visconti, lord of Milan since 1328. Around 1336, Azzone built the bridge over the Adda River to connect Lecco with the road leading to Milan.

The bridge had eight arches of unequal widths. It had two towers, each with a drawbridge, which controlled the passage and entrance to Lecco. In the center of the bridge, there was a small fortress. The fortifications of the bridge completed the defense of Lecco.

Between 1349 and 1354, Giovanni Visconti, archbishop and lord of Milan, had two spans added on the western side. In the 15th century, the Como inhabitants, suffering from flooding from the lake, claimed that the bridge was to blame, as it limited the water discharge into the Adda. At their expense, an additional span was therefore added.

In 1909–1910, despite the contrary opinion of the authority in charge of monument preservation, the bridge was widened by inserting iron brackets on the sides, knocking down the walls of the two parapets. The bridge width became 9.05 metres (29.7 ft).

== The bridge in Mona Lisa's background ==
Local scholars have traditionally identified the bridge depicted by Leonardo da Vinci behind Mona Lisa with the Azzone Visconti Bridge.

Leonardo frequently visited the Adda Valley up to Lecco and undoubtedly saw the bridge. South of Lecco, the rocky landscape along the Adda Valley also inspired Leonardo to create the background of the two versions of the Virgin of the Rocks, now held in Paris and London museums.

The geology of the landscape depicted in Mona Lisa's background is comparable to that of the lake and mountains of Lecco, confirming that the bridge depicted by Leonardo was the Azzone Visconti Bridge.

Another similarity between Leonardo's and the Azzone Visconti Bridge is the different widths of the arches.

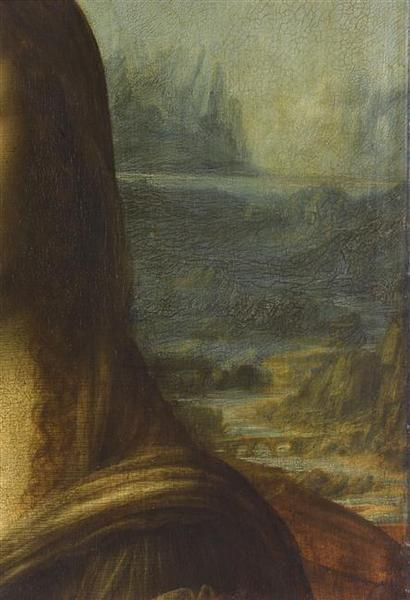
Detail of Mona Lisa's background (right side) showing the bridge identifiable with the Azzone Visconti Bridge

== Today ==
The bridge still serves to cross the Adda River with two car lanes and one pedestrian lane. It has a total length of 131 metres (430 ft).

== Sources ==
- Conato, Luigi Giuseppe (2003). Leonardo da Vinci nella Valle dell'Adda fra certezze, ipotesi, suggestioni: Lago di Como, Lecco, le Grigne, il Resegone, la Brianza, Valsassina con Bormio, Valtellina, Valchiavenna, valli di Bergamo e Brescia. Antologia dal Codice Atlantico. Foglio 573 b-r.v., già 214 r.e., 214 v.e. Antica numerazione 117 (in Italian). Lipomo (Como): Cesarenani Editrice. ISBN 9788888765051. OCLC 198442975.
- Conti, Flavio; Hybsch, Vincenzo; Vincenti, Antonello (1991). I castelli della Lombardia. Provincie di Como, Sondrio e Varese (in Italian). Novara: Istituto Geografico de Agostini. ISBN 9788840293783. OCLC 1283309593.
- Gandola, Enrico (1938). "Il ponte Azzone Visconti a Lecco". Rivista archeologica dell'antica provincia e diocesi di Como (in Italian). 115–116: 81–96.
- Muir, Dorothy (1924). A history of Milan under the Visconti. London: Methuen & Co. Ltd. OCLC 1627896.
- Strafforello, Gustavo; Chiesi, Gustavo (1896). La patria. Geografie dell'Italia (in Italian). Vol. Provincie di Como e Sondrio, Canton Ticino e Valli dei Grigioni. Torino: Unione Tipografico-Editrice. OCLC 823520573.
