= Monte San Martino (Julian Prealps) =

Mountain in Italy

Coordinates: 46°12′N 13°36′E

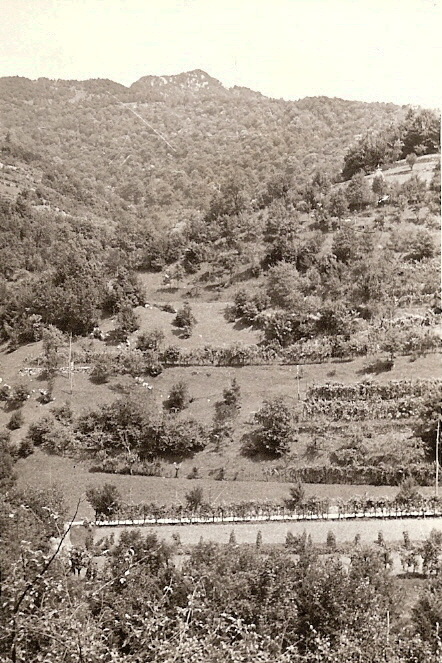
- Monte San Martino in the 1960s

Highest point
- Elevation: 987 m (3,238 ft)

Geography
- Location: Friuli-Venezia Giulia, Italy
- Parent range: Julian Prealps

Monte San Martino, also known as Svet Martin in Slovene, is a mountain of Friuli-Venezia Giulia, Italy, with an elevation of 987 metres (3,238 ft). It is located in the Julian Prealps, in the Province of Udine.

It lies in the territory of the Grimacco, between the Cosizza and Alberone valleys, next to the Priavelo pass (663 m), from which its peak can be reached through a dirt road or a hiking path. A small Romanesque church dedicated to Saint Martin (San Martino), dating to the 13th century, is located just below the summit, while a small mountain hut (Baita CAI Val Natisone) was built in 2016 on its slopes, near Priavelo pass.

In April 1848, during the First Italian War of Independence, volunteers of the Republic of San Marco took control of the mountain and exploited its commanding position to halt the advance of Austrian troops heading towards Udine. They laid down their arms after the fall of Udine rendered their resistance pointless.

A traditional festival of the local Slovene minority is held at the church of San Martino every year, on the third Sunday of September.
