= Monte Magnodeno =

Mountain in Italy

Coordinates: 45°50′23″N 9°26′27″E

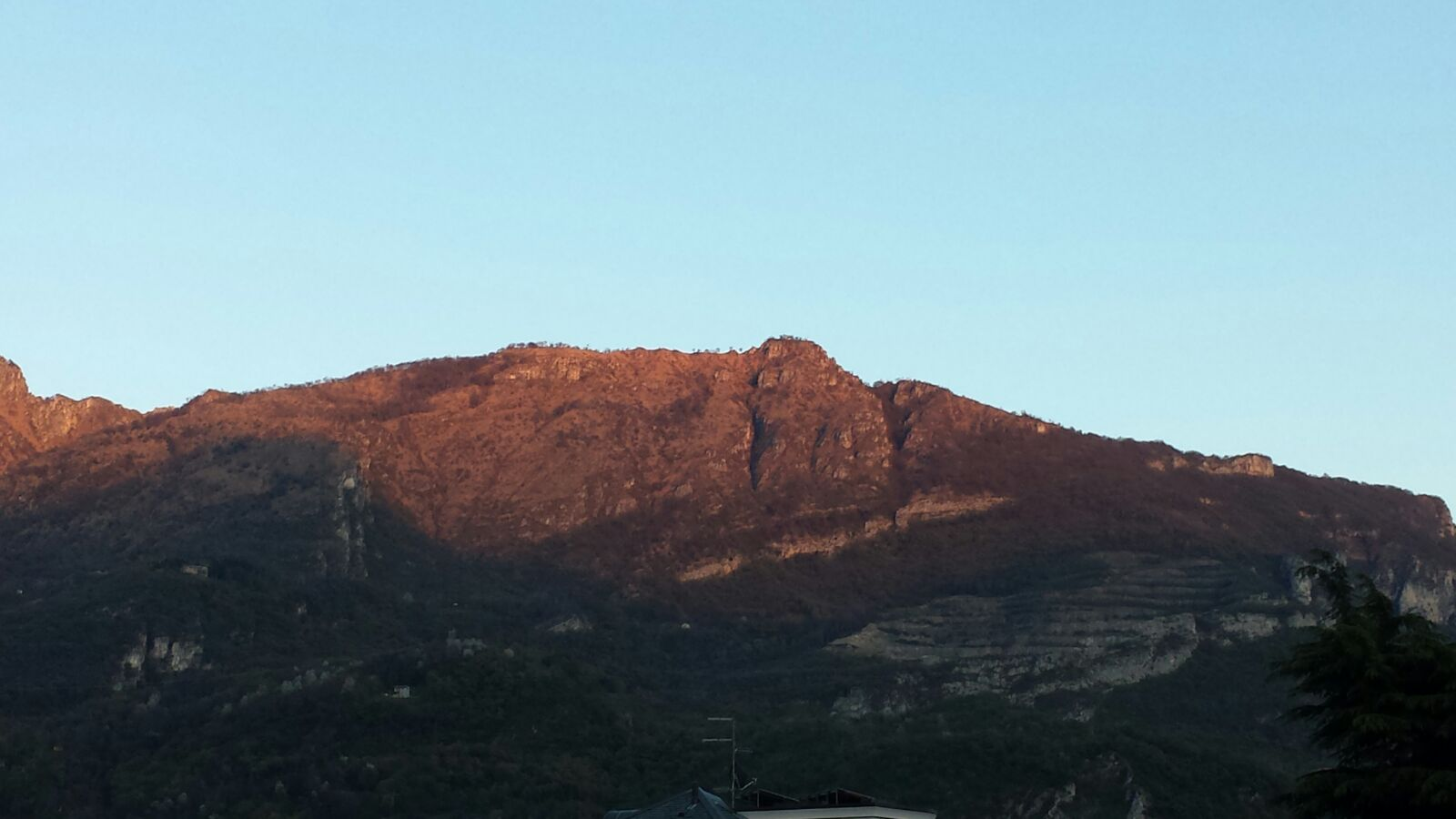

Highest point
- Elevation: 1,241 m (4,072 ft)

Geography
- Location: Lombardy, Italy
- Parent range: Bergamasque Prealps

Monte Magnodeno is a mountain of Lombardy, Italy, with an elevation of 1,241 metres (4,072 ft). It is located in the Bergamasque Prealps, between the provinces of Lecco and Bergamo.

The peak has a small mountain hut operated by the National Alpini Association.
