= San Francesco d'Assisi, Lecco =

Parish church in Lecco, Italy

Coordinates: 45.856550°N 9.397387°E

The parish church of San Francesco d'Assisi and its adjacent Capuchin convent are located in the outskirts of Lecco, region of Lombardy, Italy.

== History ==
The Franciscan order of Capuchins had previously occupied a convent in the frazione of Pescarinico until expelled by the Napoleonic government, and would not return to this town until 1949, when Cardinal Schuster and the community welcomed them to return.

For the new convent, the architect Mino Fiocchi designed and organized the construction in two years, with consecration in 1951. The large church has eight chapels. The two story nave has an octagonal dome. The facade has a palladian window above a portico with columns.
