= Casimiro Sainz =

Spanish painter (1853–1898)

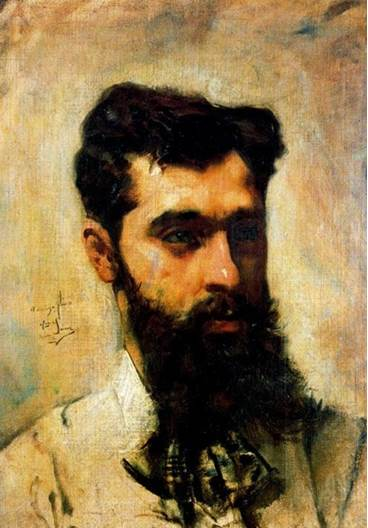
Self-portrait (1878)

Casimiro Sainz y Saiz (4 December 1853 – 19 August 1898) was a Spanish painter, known for his landscapes and portraits with interior scenes.

== Biography ==
He was born in Matamorosa, Campoo de Enmedio. His father was a veterinarian and his uncle was the noted physiologist, Luis de Hoyos Sainz. He was the youngest of ten children and his mother died of cholera when he was eleven months old.

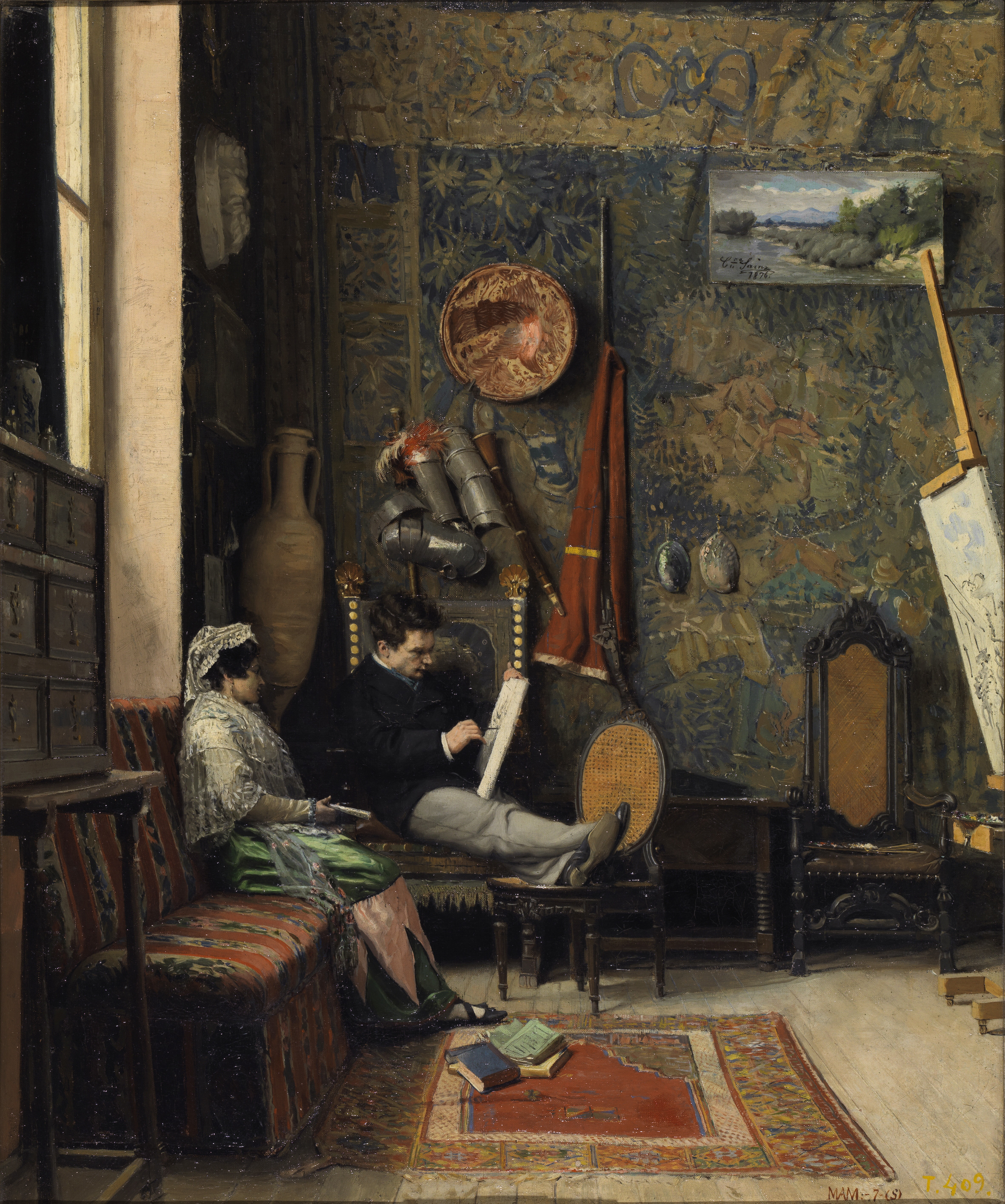
Resting (An Artist's Studio)

At the age of thirteen, he was sent to Madrid to work at his brother-in-law's grocery store. It was there that he first took some drawing lessons. Weakness in his left leg made it impossible to do hard work, so he returned home. The problem was later diagnosed as a then-inoperable tumor (possibly fibromatosis) in his left hip, although rumors persisted that his lameness was due to mistreatment by his employer.

At the age of seventeen, thanks to a scholarship from the "Diputación de Santander", he returned to Madrid and enrolled at the Real Academia de Bellas Artes de San Fernando, where he studied with Vicente Palmaroli and Carlos de Haes, among others. He frequently painted en plein aire around the city; working in a state of feverish creativity.

Constant bouts of ill-health related to his tumor led to an emotional instability that was exploited by the businessman and art dealer, Pedro Bosch Labrus, who would buy his works cheap and sell them to the nobility at inflated prices. Sainz was apparently aware of this, but had no other means of support.

In 1881, he won an award at the National Exhibition of Fine Arts, but his physical and psychological state forced his friends to take him back to Matamorosa, where his health was restored and he entered his most productive period.

He returned to Madrid in 1885 where, at first, he lived with his sister Luisa then went to the join the creative community in Malasaña. During this period, he was subject to constant relapses and recuperations; tended to by his friends. Nevertheless, he was able to participate in several exhibitions and received good notices from the critics.

His constant suffering made him delusional and he became increasingly unable to care for himself. For two years, he stayed with his friend, the painter Eduardo Pelayo. In 1890, Pelayo and another friend found it necessary to take him to a psychiatric sanatorium operated by Dr.José María Esquerdo in Carabanchel. The Diputación Provincial awarded him a pension that enabled him to defray the costs of his long stay there. That same year, he won another award at the National Exhibition.

He died in Madrid, from an infection of his left leg, aged 44, and was interred at the local cemetery. In 1922, his remains were moved to Reinosa and his grave was adorned with a sculpture by Victorio Macho. Streets have been named for him in Santander and Torrelavega.

== Selected paintings ==
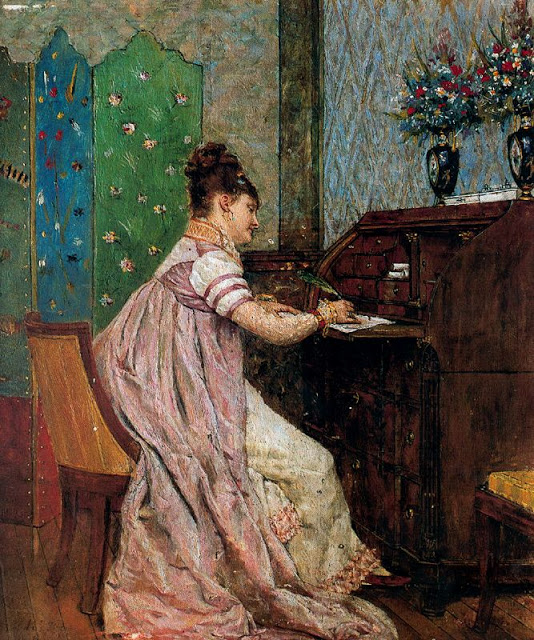
Woman at a
Writing Desk

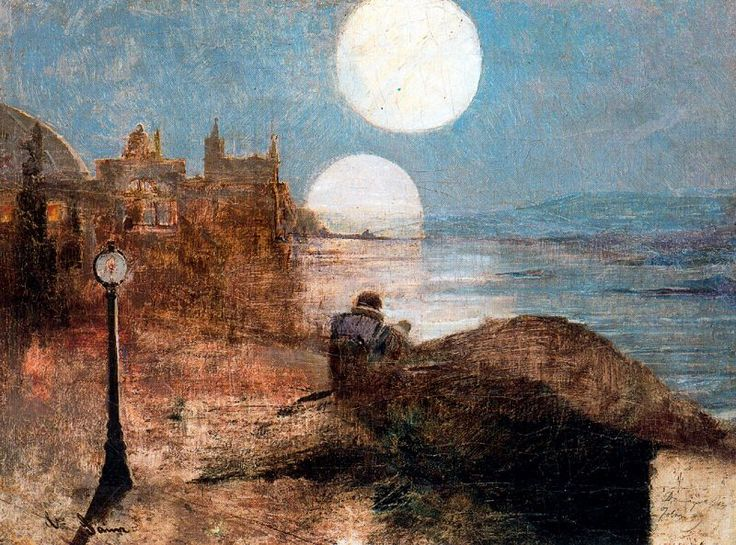
Double Moon

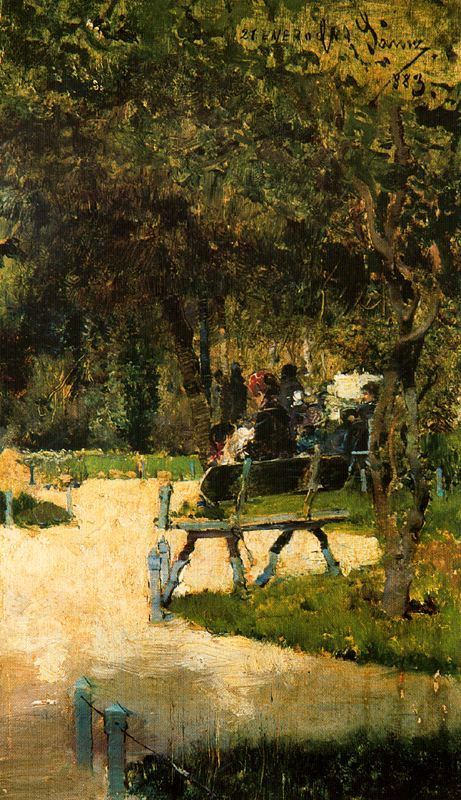
Paseo de Recoletos

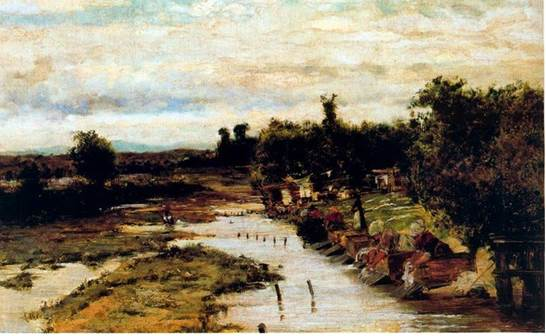
Washerwomen on the Manzanares

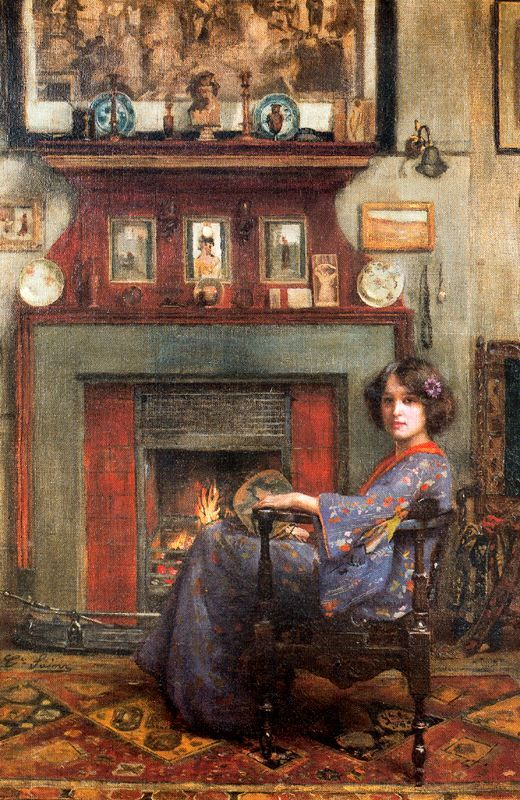
By the Fireplace
