= Gisela Casimiro =

Portuguese writer and activist (b. 1984)

- Born: 1984 (age 41–42); Guinea-Bissau
- Education: NOVA University Lisbon
- Occupation: Writer

Gisela Casimiro (Guinea Bissau, 1984) is a Portuguese writer, activist and artist.

== Biography ==
Gisela Casimiro was born in Guinea-Bissau in 1984. Three years later, she moved to Portugal, where she grew up. She studied language, Literature and Culture at the Faculty of Social and Human Sciences of the NOVA University Lisbon. She was part of the anti-racist and feminist association, INMUNE – Instituto da Mulher Negra em Portugal, created by Joacine Katar Moreira, and is a member of UNA – União Negra das Artes.

== Awards and recognition ==
In 2022, Lisbon City Council invited 48 authors to write a sentence alluding to freedom, and Gisela Casimiro was one of them. The 48 sentences were then painted on the ground in the city as part of the celebrations for the 48th anniversary of the Carnation Revolution. In 2023, she was listed as one of the 100 influential black personalities in Lusophony, as part of the 100 Power List, an initiative by the digital magazine Bantumen.

== Selected work ==
Translations

- Irmã Marginal (2023, Orfeu Negro)

Poetry

- Erosão (2018, Urutau; ISBN 978-65-5900-263-4)
- Estendais (2023, Editorial Caminho)
- Giz (2023, Urutau)

Theatre plays

- Casa com Árvores Dentro (2022, dir. Cláudia Semedo)

Collections

- Rio de Pérolas (2020, ed. António Martins, Ipsis Verbis)
- Reconstituição Portuguesa (2022, ed. Viton Araújo and Diego Tórgo, Companhia das Letras; ISBN 9789897845635)
