= Casimiro Radice =

Italian painter (1834–1908)

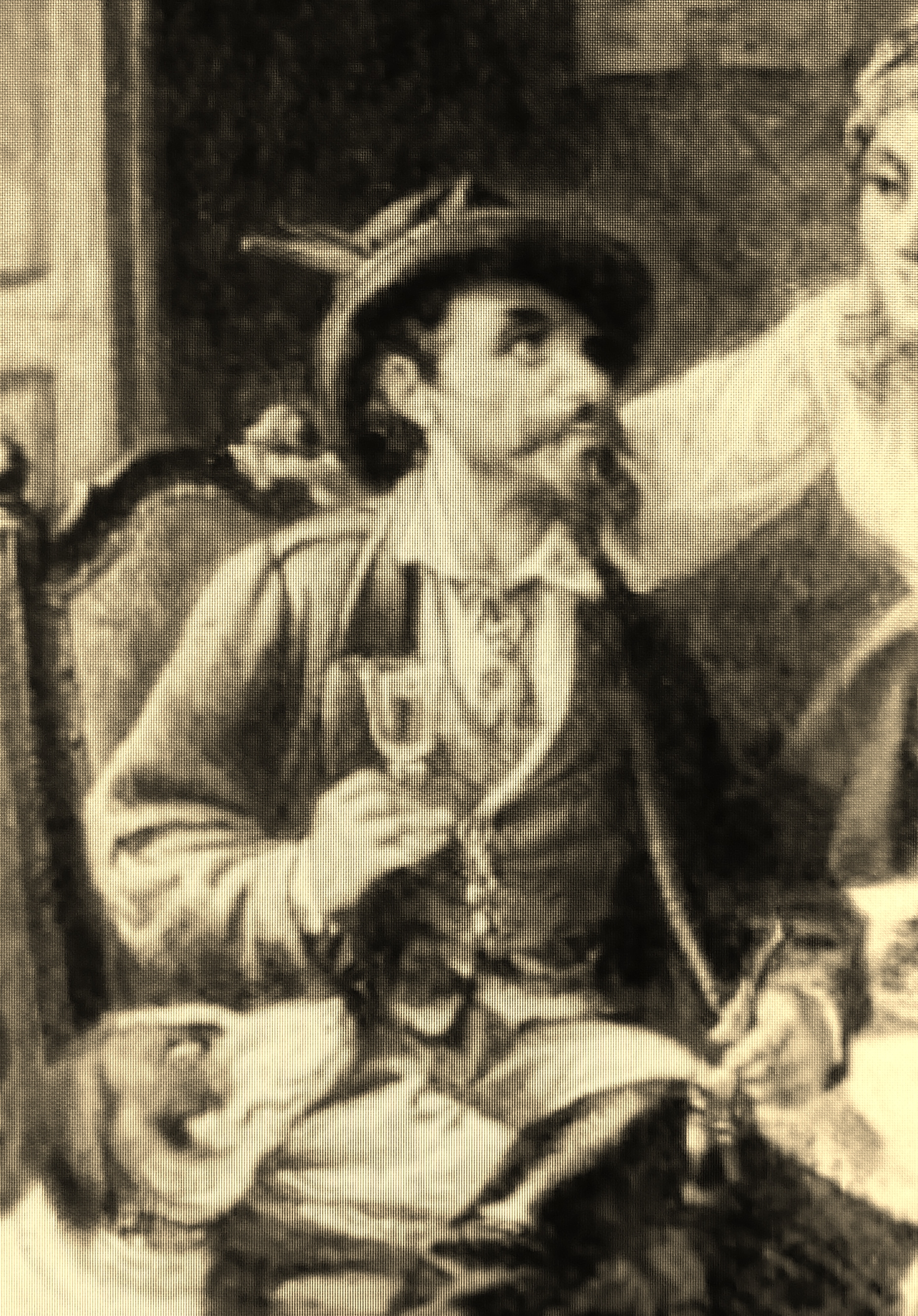
Autoritratto (part. de Il ritorno del cacciatore)

Casimiro Radice (15 December 1834 – 1908) was an Italian painter.

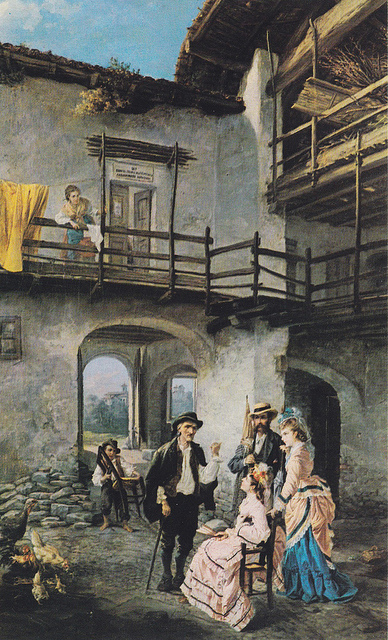
Cascina Costa a Galbiate

== Biography ==
Radice was born in Milan, Austrian Empire. He lived modestly managing a small hotel in the town of Galbiate end died poor. Was self-educated as a painter and painted interesting and graceful works of sacred and genre subjects, in both fresco and oil.

In 1881, at the Milan Exhibition, he exhibited with good success La visita alla nutrice, admired by the public. Still in Milan, in 1883, he displayed Supplizio di Tantalo and Cestello di fiori, very well done. In 1884, at the National Exhibition of Turin, he displayed Fior di primavera and Non ti scordar di me.

A number of ex-voto paintings in churches around Milan have been attributed to Radice and to followers of his style.

He painted portrait of the first mayor of Galbiate, now found in the city hall. After the 1870s, he concentrated on genre scenes of rural and rustic countryside, including The courtship, precisely of the year 1870, currently in a private collection in Piacenza; The return of the hunter in which he paints his own self-portrait in the protagonist, preserved in the Galleria Comunale d'Arte di Lecco; Interno of the Cascina Costa dove ebbe il primo nutrimento Alessandro Manzoni (Interior of farmhouse where the famous writer A. Manzoni was weaned), of the year 1875; La festa campestre di San Michele presso Galbiate - versante di Lecco (1875); La villa S. Bernardino a Galbiate dopo un temporale (1879); Ritorno dalla filanda (1880).

In the years 1891–1892 he dedicated himself to the decoration of the Church of Santa Agnese in Olginate in the province of Lecco ( church dating back to the mid-1500s but whose interior was profoundly remodeled in 1840), where he painted the paintings in the presbytery with scenes from the martyrdom of Saint Agnese and the medallions of the same presbytery and of the vault, as well as the eight sails above the windows of the nave.

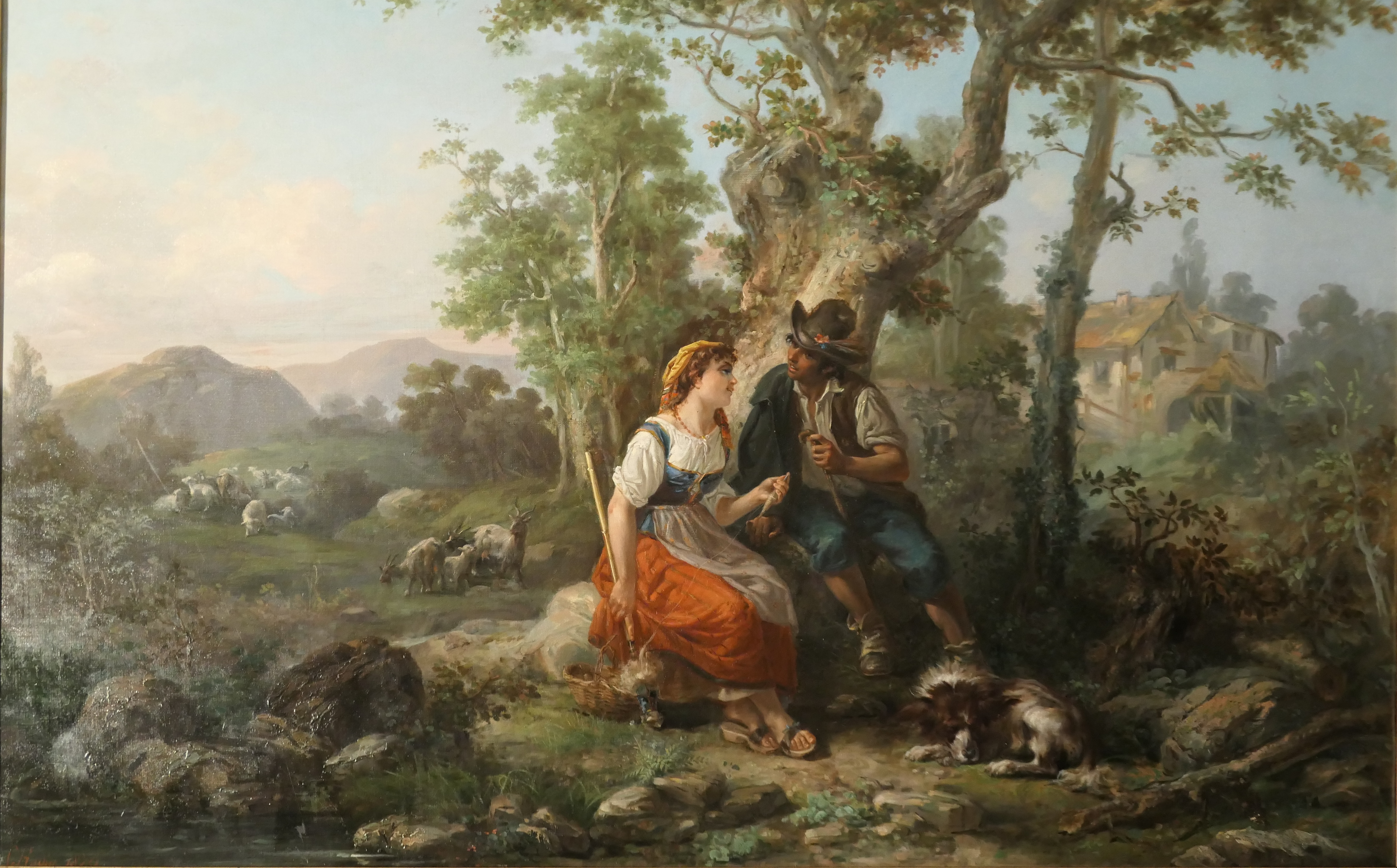
Il corteggiamento

== Sources ==
- Comanducci, A. M. Dizionario illustrato dei pittori disegnatori e incisori italiani. Milano: Patuzzi Editore, 1962. 3rd ed., vol. IV, p. 1539.
- Dizionario enciclopedico Bolaffi dei pittori e incisori italiani. Milano: Giorgio Mondadori Editore, 1983. Vol. IX. ISBN 8837406703.
- Breve storia della chiesa prepositurale di S. Agnese in Olginate. Olginate: Parrocchia di Olginate.
