= Monte San Martino (Lecco) =

Mountain in Italy

Coordinates: 45°56′40″N 9°23′15″E

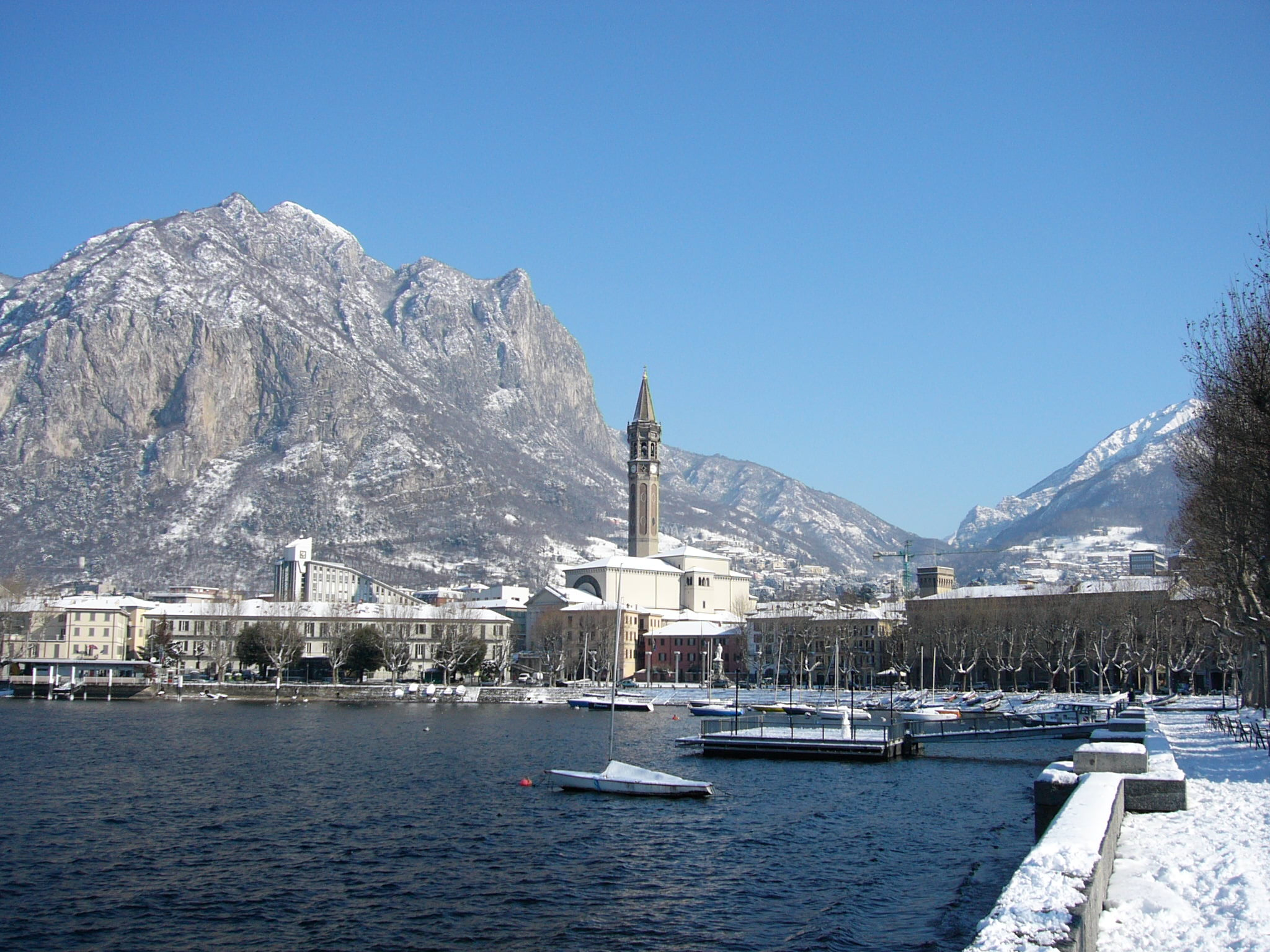

Highest point
- Elevation: 1,090 m (3,580 ft)

Geography
- Location: Lombardy, Italy
- Parent range: Bergamo Alps

Monte San Martino (Lecco) is a mountain of Lombardy, Italy. It is located within the Bergamo Alps.
