= 2026 Winter Olympics torch relay =

- Host city: Milan and Cortina d'Ampezzo, Italy
- Countries visited: Greece; Italy; Vatican City
- Distance: 12,000 kilometres (7,500 mi)
- Torchbearers: 10,001
- Theme: The Greatest Journey
- Start date: 26 November 2025
- End date: 6 February 2026
- Torch designer: Carlo Ratti Associati

The torch relay (Italian: Il Viaggio della Fiamma Olimpica, lit. 'The voyage of the Olympic flame') for the 2026 Winter Olympics began on 26 November 2025 in Olympia, Greece, and concluded on 6 February 2026 in Milan, Italy, coinciding with the opening ceremony at San Siro. The routes for both the Olympic and Paralympic torch relays were unveiled by the Fondazione Milano Cortina 2026 on 26 November 2024, one year before the start of the former.

Following the lighting of the Olympic flame in Olympia, a handover ceremony took place in Athens on 4 December 2025. The flame then arrived in Rome and visited all 110 provinces of Italy, making 60 stops over 63 days across 12,000 kilometres (7,500 mi) and involving 10,001 torchbearers. The torch was in Naples for Christmas, Bari for New Year's Eve, and in Cortina d'Ampezzo on 26 January to commemorate 70 years since it hosted the 1956 Winter Olympics. While the torch is in Piedmont, a tribute is planned for skier Matilde Lorenzi, who died while training in October 2024. The torch relay plans to visit every World Heritage Site in the country. On 29 November 2024, Italian comedy trio Gli Autogol were announced as official narrators for the torch relay.

== Torch and torchbearers ==
The design of the torch was unveiled on 14 April at Expo 2025 in Osaka, Japan, as well as simultaneously at Milan's Triennale; Osaka and Milan are twin cities. The Olympic torch, which was designed by Carlo Ratti Associati, is light blue, shaped like a flute, and weighs 1,060 grams (37 oz). Made from recycled aluminium, it was designed to be refillable and runs on a renewable liquefied petroleum gas primarily made from waste.

For the torch relay, 10,001 torchbearers are expected to be involved. Applications for torchbearers opened on 12 February 2025 for the Italian leg, and on 10 September 2025 for the Greek leg. Rower Petros Gkaidatzis was the first torchbearer once the flame was lit in Olympia; alpine skier AJ Ginnis had originally been selected by the Hellenic Olympic Committee, but was unable to participate due to injury. Water polo player Eleni Xenaki was the last torchbearer for the Greek leg.

Torchbearers who have been announced for the Italian leg include singer sport shooter Abhinav Bindra and footballers Cristiana Girelli and Zlatan Ibrahimović. In addition, the digital ambassadors for the Games will also serve as torchbearers, including actress Ludovica Gargari.

== Stops in Greece ==
Main stops on the Greek leg of the 2026 Winter Olympics torch relay

The Greek leg was announced on 9 May 2025, involving over 450 torchbearers covering more than 2,200 kilometres (1,400 mi) through 23 regional units. The Greek leg will also pass by the country's twelve largest ski resorts for the first time. A total of 36 welcoming ceremonies took place over the nine days before the flame's arrival at the Panathenaic Stadium in Athens for the handover ceremony on 4 December 2025.

The Olympic torch relay began on 26 November 2025 with a ceremony at the Archaeological Museum of Olympia. Original plans to host the ceremony at the Stadium at Olympia, as with previous torch relays, were changed due to forecasts of poor weather during the week. The actual lighting took place two days prior on 24 November at the Temple of Hera, using a parabolic mirror to concentrate the rays of the sun. The flame was then preserved in a safety lamp until the ceremony, where it was used to light the Olympic torch in the museum. In Patras, the torch made a stop for a ceremony at the former home of Kostis Palamas, lyricist of the Olympic Hymn.

Also due to inclement weather, it was announced that the handover ceremony would be greatly reduced, with the artistic component being cut, and the number of participants limited. The ceremony saw performances by Christina Poulitsi singing the Olympic Hymn, Tassis Christoyannis singing the national anthem of Italy, and Yannis Christopoulos singing the national anthem of Greece. Water polo player Eleni Xenaki and her teammates lit the cauldron at the Panathenaic Stadium, after which Hellenic Olympic Committee president Isidoros Kouvelos handed the torch to Fondazione Milano Cortina 2026 president Giovanni Malagò. Tennis player Jasmine Paolini was selected as a torchbearer during the ceremony and accompanied the flame on an ITA Airways flight, arriving at Rome Fiumicino Airport.

Olympic torch relay route in Greece
Day	Date (2025)	Stops	Notable torchbearers
1	26 Nov	Olympia; Pyrgos; Amaliada; Ancient Elis; Lampeia; Kalavryta	Petros Gkaidatzis, rower; Stefania Belmondo, former cross-country skier; Armin Zöggeler, former luger; Dimosthenis Tampakos, former gymnast and Hellenic Olympic Academy president; Nikolaos Skiathitis, rower; Ioannis Tsilis, rower; Stergios Papachristos, rower; Aikaterini Oikonomopoulou, water polo player
2	27 Nov	Kalavryta; Patras; Rio–Antirrio Bridge; Agrinio; Karpenisi	Dimitris Gkotsopoulos, actor; Charalampos Flouskounis, taekwondo athlete; Zhang Boheng, gymnast; Wang Siyu, basketball player; Chen Yujie, sprinter; Ioannis Antoniou, alpine skier
3	28 Nov	Karpenisi; Karditsa; Mouzaki; Pyli; Metsovo	Antigoni Drisbioti, race walker; Ioannis Bourousis, basketball player; Dimitrios Tsiamis, triple jumper; Ioannis Tsilis, rower; Apostolos Angelis, cross-country skier
4	29 Nov	Metsovo; Grevena; Kozani; Ptolemaida; Argos Orestiko; Kastoria	Dimosthenis Tampakos, former gymnast and Hellenic Olympic Academy president; Iordanis Konstantinidis, former wrestler; Apostolos Telikostoglou, taekwondo athlete; Evangelia Anastasiadou, rower; Ioannis Christou, rower; Zoi Fitsiou, rower; Dimitris Diamantidis, former basketball player
5	30 Nov	Kastoria; Florina; Agios Athanasios; Edessa; Skydra; Naousa	Jeanne Hristou, fencer; Anastasios Tsiou, shot putter; Sophia Ralli, alpine skier
6	1 Dec	Naousa; Giannitsa; Serres; Drama; Thessaloniki Olympic Museum; Thessaloniki	Polyniki Emmanouilidou, sprinter; Elisavet Mystakidou, taekwondo athlete; Dimitrios Pelkas, footballer; Christos Marmarellis, alpine skier; Apostolos Taskoudis, wrestler; Konstantinos Douvalidis, hurdler; Maria Georgatou, rhythmic gymnast; Polymnia Saregkou, former basketball player
7	2 Dec	Thessaloniki; Elassona; Portaria (Pelion); Lamia	Evangelia Psarra, former archer; Stergios Papachristos, rower; Eleftheria Ftouli, former synchronised swimmer; Panagiotis Giannakis, former basketball player
8	3 Dec	Lamia; Arachova; Livadeia; Kifissia; Marousi; Hellenic Olympic Committee headquarters (Chalandri); Peristeri; Aigaleo; Kallithea; Nea Smyrni; Acropolis	Athanasios Ghavelas, sprinter; Virginia Kravarioti, sailor; Vasileios Polymeros, rower; Stefanos Ntouskos, rower
9	4 Dec	Acropolis; Syntagma Square; Metropolitan Cathedral of Athens; Athens City Hall; Omonoia Square; Old Parliament House; Academy of Athens; National and Kapodistrian University of Athens; National Archaeological Museum; Pedion Areos; Athens Concert Hall; National Gallery; Panathenaic Stadium	Stefanos Dimopoulos, sprint canoeist; Stefanos Chandakas, former sailor and Hellenic Olympic Committee secretary-general; Kimberly Guilfoyle, U.S. ambassador to Greece; Patrick Soon-Shiong, surgeon; Georgios Kougioumtsidis, wrestler; Jasmine Paolini, tennis player; Filippo Ganna, cyclist; Eleni Xenaki, water polo player

== Stops in Italy ==
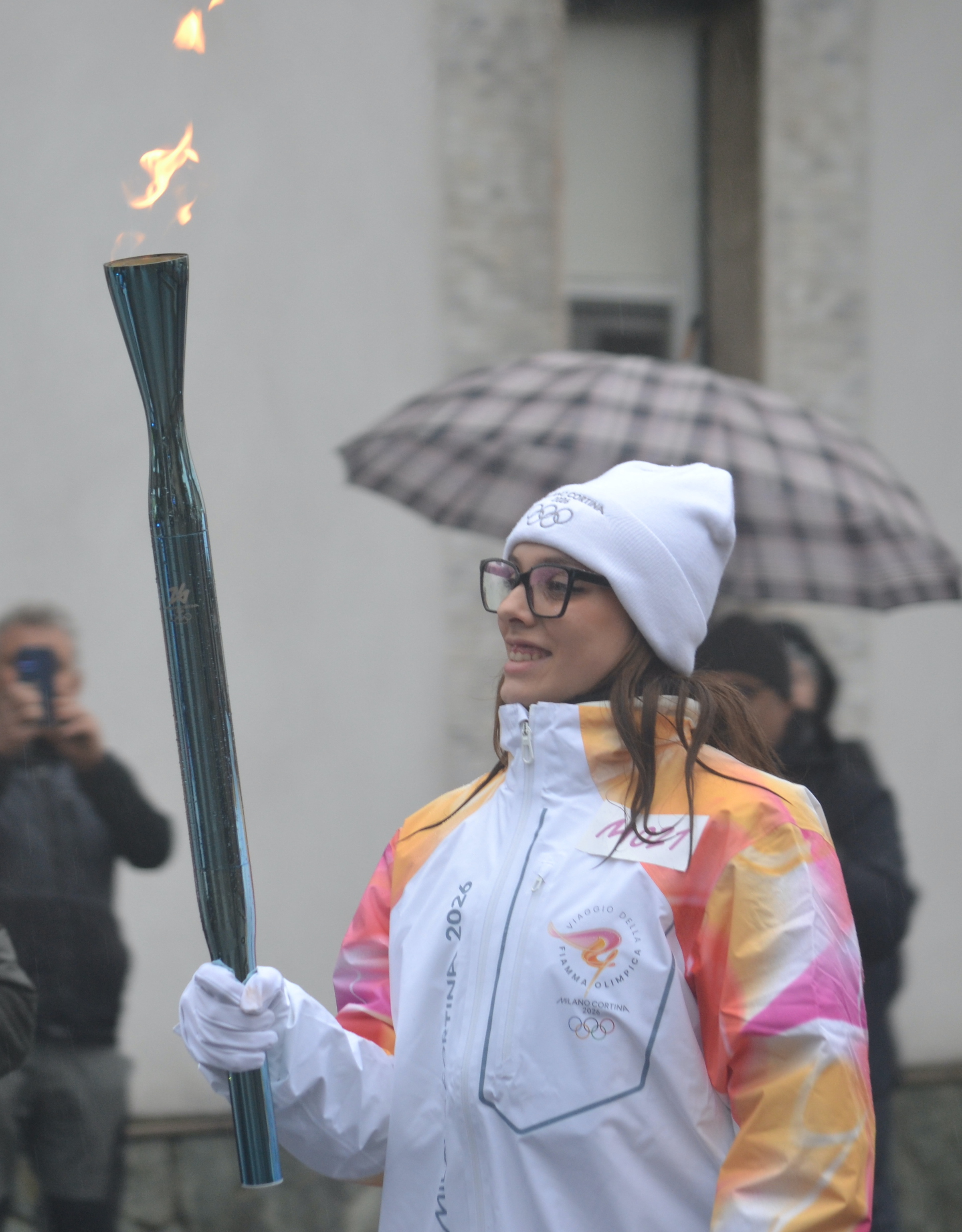
Torchbearer in Busto Arsizio, 4 February 2026

The flame arrived at Rome's Quirinal Palace on 4 December 2025, with the relay through the country starting two days later from the Stadio dei Marmi. It travelled through several regions including Tuscany before visiting the islands of Sardinia and Sicily and then returning to the mainland. The route plans to visit all 20 regions of Italy and 110 provinces before ending at San Siro for the opening ceremony of the Games.

On 16 December, the torch reached Lampedusa, the southernmost part of Italy, transported aboard an AgustaWestland AW139 helicopter flown by the Italian Air Force.

Stages of the 2026 Winter Olympics torch relay in Italy
Stage	No.	Date	Region	Stops	Notable torchbearers
Rome	1	6 Dec 2025	Lazio	Stadio dei Marmi; Largo di Torre Argentina; St. Peter's Square; Castel Sant'Angelo; Pantheon; Gasometro; Piazza del Campidoglio; Roman Forum; Colosseum; Via Veneto; Trevi Fountain; Piazza di Monte Citorio; Chigi Palace; Piazza di Spagna; Via del Corso; Piazza del Popolo	Gregorio Paltrinieri, swimmer; Elisa Di Francisca, former fencer; Gianmarco Tamberi, high jumper; Achille Polonara, basketball player; Matteo Berrettini, tennis player; Gigi Datome, former basketball player; Andrea Bargnani, former basketball player; Max Biaggi, former motorcycle racer; Giuseppe Tornatore, film director; Noemi, singer; Achille Lauro, singer; Claudia Gerini, actress
Viterbo	2	7 Dec 2025	Lazio	Rome; Ostia; Civitavecchia; Tarquinia; Viterbo; Separate convoy: Appian Way; Ostia Antica; Tivoli; Hadrian's Villa; Villa d'Este	Martín Castrogiovanni, former rugby player; Giancarlo Peris, former track athlete; Martina Centofanti, rhythmic gymnast; Pierluigi Pardo, sports commentator
Terni	3	8 Dec 2025	Umbria	Montefiascone; Orvieto; Pozzo di San Patrizio; Narni; Rieti; Terni; Separate convoy: Cascate delle Marmore	Danilo Petrucci, motorcycle racer; Alessio Foconi, fencer; Massimiliano Rota, former bobsledder; Tonino Viali, former runner
Perugia	4	9 Dec 2025	Umbria	Spoleto; Foligno; Spello; Assisi; Papal Basilica of Saint Mary of the Angels in Assisi; Perugia; Piazza IV Novembre; Separate convoy: Todi; Trevi	Andrea Ranocchia, former footballer; Simone Giannelli, volleyball player; Margherita Castellani, track and field athlete; Lamberto Boranga, former footballer
Siena	5	10 Dec 2025	Tuscany	Gubbio; Città di Castello; Arezzo; Montepulciano; Pienza; Siena; Separate convoy: Crete Senesi; Castiglione del Lago	Alice Volpi, fencer; Paolo Lorenzi, tennis player; Matteo Betti, fencer; Tommaso Marino, former basketball player; Elena Vallortigara, high jumper; Irene Siragusa, sprinter
Florence	6	11 Dec 2025	Tuscany	Grosseto; Volterra; Pontedera; Empoli; Florence; Piazza della Santissima Annunziata; Separate convoy: San Gimignano	Al Bano, singer; Veronica Angeloni, former volleyball player; Leonardo Fabbri, shot putter; Lorenzo Zazzeri, swimmer; Ambra Sabatini, sprinter; Giancarlo Antognoni, former footballer
Livorno	7	12 Dec 2025	Tuscany	Prato; Pistoia; Montecatini Terme; Great Spa Towns of Europe; Lucca; Pisa; Piazza dei Miracoli; Livorno	Aldo Montano, fencer; Leonardo Fiaschi, comedian; Igor Protti, former footballer; Alessandro Fantozzi, former basketball player; Ambra Sabatini, sprinter
Nuoro	8	13 Dec 2025	Sardinia	Olbia; Sassari; Porto Torres; Alghero; Nuoro; Separate convoy: Stintino	Melissa Satta, television presenter; Alessia Orro, volleyball player; Nicola Bartolini, gymnast; Silvia Basolu, handball player; Gianmario Fancello, judoka
Cagliari	9	14 Dec 2025	Sardinia	Oristano; Sanluri; Quartu Sant'Elena; Cagliari; Separate convoy: Iglesias; Su Nuraxi	Dalia Kaddari, sprinter; Lorenzo Patta, sprinter; Giulia Stagno, field hockey player; Stefano Oppo, rower
Palermo	10	15 Dec 2025	Sicily	Castelvetrano; Mazara del Vallo; Marsala; Trapani; Palermo; Palazzo dei Normanni; Piazza Ruggero Settimo; Separate convoy: Selinunte; Monreale Cathedral	Filippo Inzaghi, former footballer; Tilman Fertitta, U.S. ambassador to Italy; Rachid Berradi, runner; Sofia Giunchiglia, sailor; Tony Cairoli, motorcycle racer
Agrigento	11	16 Dec 2025	Sicily	Cefalù; Enna; Caltanissetta; Agrigento; Valle dei Templi; Separate convoy: Piazza Armerina; Lampedusa	Mirco Scarantino, weightlifter; Elena Dibattista, tennis player; Matteo Platania, padelista; Emma Colletti, karateka
Syracuse	12	17 Dec 2025	Sicily	Licata; Gela; Ragusa; Noto; Val di Noto; Avola; Syracuse; Ortygia; Separate convoy: Caltagirone; Marzamemi; Portopalo di Capo Passero	Luigi Busà, karateka; Valentino Gallo, water polo player; Samuele Burgo, canoeist; Irene Burgo, canoe sprinter; Vincenzo Maiorca, speed skater; Matteo Melluzzo, sprinter; Nick DiGiovanni, chef
Catania	13	18 Dec 2025	Sicily	Priolo Gargallo; Augusta; Carlentini; Catania; Piazza del Duomo; Separate convoy: Nicolosi; Mount Etna	Myriam Sylla, volleyball player; Robert Pires, former footballer; Carmelo Musumeci, futsal player; Tania Di Mario, water polo player; Salvatore Cavallaro, boxer
Reggio Calabria	14	19 Dec 2025	Calabria	Acireale; Giarre; Riposto; Messina; Reggio Calabria; Separate convoy: Taormina	Daniele Garozzo, fencer; Vincenzo Nibali, former cyclist; Daniela Rita Dattilo, runner; Fabio Vazzana, triathlete; Miriana Tona, tennis player; Floriano Noto, sports executive; Pietro Iemmello, footballer; Massimo Palanca, former footballer
Catanzaro	15	20 Dec 2025	Calabria	Gioia Tauro; Rosarno; Vibo Valentia; Lamezia Terme; Catanzaro; Separate convoy: Tropea	Antonio Fuoco, racing driver; Anna Russo, writer; Simone Alessio, taekwondo practitioner; Francesca Stancati, footballer
Salerno	16	21 Dec 2025	Campania	Cosenza; Sala Consilina; Battipaglia; Bellizzi; Salerno; Separate convoy: Crotone; Maratea; Cristo Redentore; Paestum	Stefano Maiolica, Internet celebrity; Rossella Gregorio, fencer; Claudia Mandia, archer
Pompei	17	22 Dec 2025	Campania	Salerno, Sorrento, Amalfi, Positano, Gragnano, Castellammare di Stabia, Pompei	Alessandra Mastronardi, actress; Immacolata Cerasuolo, swimmer; Sandro Cuomo, former fencer
Naples	18	23 Dec 2025	Campania	Pompei, Torre Annunziata, Torre del Greco, Ercolano, Portici, Marcianise, Caivano, San Giorgio a Cremano, Caivano, Scampia, Naples	Giuseppe Abbagnale, former rower; Fabio Cannavaro, former footballer; Massimiliano Rosolino, former swimmer; Ciro Ferrara, former footballer
Naples	18	24 Dec 2025	Campania	Remains in Naples during Christmas Eve and Christmas Day	—N/a
Naples	18	25 Dec 2025	Campania	Remains in Naples during Christmas Eve and Christmas Day	—N/a
Latina	19	26 Dec 2025	Lazio	Naples, Caserta, Minturno, Formia, Gaeta, Sabaudia, San Felice Circeo, Latina	Romano Battisti, former rower; Alessio Sartori, former rower; Matteo Sartori, rower; Alessia Mesiano, boxer; Mauro Di Prospero, sport shooter
Benevento	20	27 Dec 2025	Campania	Latina, Sermoneta, Frosinone, Montecassino, Cassino, Pomigliano d'Arco, Telese Terme, Benevento	Rossana Pasquino, fencer
Potenza	21	28 Dec 2025	Basilicata	Benevento, Avellino, Melfi, Castel Lagopesole, Rionero in Vulture, Venosa, Filiano, Pietragalla, Potenza	Arisa, singer; Francesca Palumbo, fencer; Domenico Acerenza, swimmer; Donato Telesca, powerlifter
Taranto	22	29 Dec 2025	Apulia	Potenza, Castelmezzano, Pisticci, Matera, Altamura, Gioia del Colle, Massafra, Crispiano, Taranto	Antonio Giovinazzi, racing driver; Carlo Molfetta, taekwondo practitioner; Roberta Vinci, former tennis player; Antonella Palmisano, racewalker
Lecce	23	30 Dec 2025	Apulia	Taranto, Nardò, Gallipoli, Presicce-Acquarica, Maglie, Otranto, Lecce	Ferdinando De Giorgi, former volleyball player; Olsi Paja, runner; Stefano Petranca, runner
Bari	24	31 Dec 2025	Apulia	Lecce, Brindisi, Ostuni, Cisternino, Alberobello, Monopoli, Polignano a Mare, Bari	Marco Vignola, former bobsledder; Carmela Glorioso, runner
Campobasso	25	1 Jan 2026	Molise	Bari, Trani, Castel del Monte, Barletta, Foggia, Termoli, Campobasso	Andrea Lalli, runner; Maria Centracchio, judoka; Rossella Ferro; Alessio D'Agostino, swimmer
Pescara	26	2 Jan 2026	Abruzzo	Campobasso, Isernia, Castel di Sangro, Roccaraso, Pescara	Federica Ciampoli, basketball player; Daniele Fontecchio, hurdler; Roberta Pagliuca, runner; Luca Ultimo Bronzi, kiteboarder
L'Aquila	27	3 Jan 2026	Abruzzo	Pescara, Chieti, Montesilvano, Silvi, Roseto degli Abruzzi, Giulianova, Teramo, Amatrice, L'Aquila	Paolo Aquilio, basketball player; Christian Dervishi, cross-country skier; Giovanni Scalisi, alpine skier; Giorgio Cabrini, medical doctor, skier; Alessandra Susmeli, runner
Ancona	28	4 Jan 2026	Marche	L'Aquila, Rocca Calascio, Ascoli Piceno, San Benedetto del Tronto, Fermo, Civitanova Marche, Macerata, Ancona	Claudia Rossi, sailor; Luigi Casadei, javelin thrower; Mattia Occhinero, boxer
Rimini	29	5 Jan 2026	Emilia-Romagna	Ancona, Jesi, Senigallia, Fano, Gradara, Pesaro, Urbino, Riccione, Rimini	Valentina Vezzali, former fencer; Matteo Signani, boxer; Nicole Piomboni, volleyball player; Milva Rossi, former softball player
Bologna	30	6 Jan 2026	Emilia-Romagna	Rimini, Cesena, Forlì, Faenza, Imola, Bologna	Marco Belinelli, former basketball player; Sabina Valbusa, cross-country skier; Luigi Samele, fencer; Marco Di Vaio, former footballer
Ferrara	31	7 Jan 2026	Emilia-Romagna	Bologna, Cesenatico, Cervia, Ravenna, Comacchio, Ferrara	Jessica Rossi, sport shooter; Mirco Antenucci, former footballer; Alessia Maurelli, rhythmic gymnast; Martina Santandrea, rhythmic gymnast
Parma	32	8 Jan 2026	Emilia-Romagna	Ferrara, Maranello, Fiorano Modenese, Sassuolo, Sestola, Modena, Reggio Emilia, Parma	Giulia Ghiretti, swimmer; Alessandro Fattori, former alpine skier; Franco Bertoli, former volleyball player
Genoa	33	9 Jan 2026	Liguria	Parma, Carrara, Massa, Riomaggiore, Manarola, La Spezia, Lavagna, Chiavari, Rapallo, Portofino, Genoa	Gabriele Lanza, ice hockey player; Tommaso Cassissa, content creator; Linda Cerruti, synchronised swimmer; Ilaria Elvira Accame, sprinter
Cuneo	34	10 Jan 2026	Piedmont	Genoa, Savona, Imperia, Sanremo, Dolceacqua, Ventimiglia, Cuneo	Elisa Rigaudo, race walker; Nicola Dutto, motorcycle racer; Maurizio Damilano, former race walker
Turin	35	11 Jan 2026	Piedmont	Cuneo, Bra, La Morra, Alba, Sestriere, Asti, Moncalieri, Stupinigi, Turin	Federico Basso, actor; Marina Lubian, volleyball player; Carlotta Gilli, swimmer; Francesco Bagnaia, motorcycle racer
Aosta	36	12 Jan 2026	Aosta Valley	Turin, Rivoli, Settimo Torinese, Chivasso, Chatillon, Aosta	Andrea Macrì, ice hockey player; Federico Pellegrino, cross-country skier; Arianna Follis, cross-country skier; Francesca Ghirelli, dancer; Andrea Soncin, football coach and former footballer
Novara	37	13 Jan 2026	Piedmont	Aosta, Monte Rosa, Ivrea, Biella, Oropa, Vercelli, Casale Monferrato, Novara	Nicole Orlando, track and field athlete; Riccardo Bisatti, pianist; Francesca Gallina, snowboarder; Francesca Marsaglia, former alpine skier
Varese	38	14 Jan 2026	Lombardy	Novara, Borgomanero, Gozzano, Verbania, Borromean Islands, Baveno, Stresa, Arona, Varese	Massimiliano Allegri, football manager and former footballer; Alessandro Andreoni, ice hockey player; Andrea Meneghin, former basketball player; Francesca Cesarini, dancer
Pavia	39	15 Jan 2026	Lombardy	Varese, Magenta, Abbiategrasso, Vigevano, Mortara, Torre d'Isola, San Martino Siccomario, Voghera, Pavia	Gli Autogol, comedians; Danielle Madam, shot putter; Mauro Nespoli, archer; Lorenzo Bernardi, former volleyball player
Piacenza	40	16 Jan 2026	Emilia-Romagna	Pavia, Voghera, Lodi, Casalpusterlengo, Codogno, Alessandria, Tortona, Piacenza	Alessandro Cattelan, television personality; Silvia Zanardi, cyclist; Andrea Dallavalle, triple jumper
Brescia	41	17 Jan 2026	Lombardy	Piacenza, Cremona, Crema, Sarnico, Paratico, Iseo, Brescia	Domenico Fioravanti, former swimmer; Ambra Angiolini, actress and singer; Anna Danesi, volleyball player; Vanessa Ferrari, artistic gymnast
Verona	42	18 Jan 2026	Veneto	Brescia, Castiglione delle Stiviere, Desenzano del Garda, Sant'Ambrogio di Valpolicella, Verona	Paola Pezzo, cyclist; Elia Viviani, cyclist; Elena Cecchini, cyclist; Sara Simeoni, high jumper
Mantua	43	19 Jan 2026	Lombardy	Verona, Villafranca di Verona, Valeggio sul Mincio, Custoza, Isola della Scala, Soave, Asola, Viadana, Suzzara, Mantua, Brescello, Mantua	Roberto Boninsegna, former footballer; Grazia Attene, former runner; Lucilla Boari, archer
Vicenza	44	20 Jan 2026	Veneto	Mantua, Nogara, Legnago, Rovigo, Adria, Monselice, Este, Abano Terme, Vicenza	Gelindo Bordin, runner
Padua	45	21 Jan 2026	Veneto	Vicenza, Schio, Asiago, Bassano del Grappa, Asolo, Montebelluna, Castelfranco Veneto, Cittadella, Padua	Mirco Bergamasco, rugby player; Mauro Bergamasco, former rugby player; Silvio Martinello, former cyclist; Novella Calligaris, former swimmer
Venice	46	22 Jan 2026	Veneto	Padua, Chioggia, Stra, Treviso, Mestre, Venice	Red Canzian, musician; Cristiana Capotondi, actress; Francesco Lamon, cyclist; Alessandro Troncon, former rugby player
Trieste	47	23 Jan 2026	Friuli-Venezia Giulia	Venice, Musile di Piave, San Donà di Piave, Jesolo, Concordia Sagittaria, Portogruaro, Caorle, Aquileia, Ronchi dei Legionari, Monfalcone, Trieste	Margherita Granbassi, fencer; Alberto Tonut, former basketball player; Veronica Toniolo, judoka; Giovanna Micol, sailor
Udine	48	24 Jan 2026	Friuli-Venezia Giulia	Trieste, Tarvisio, Gorizia, Gradisca d'Isonzo, Sagrado, Fogliano Redipuglia, Palmanova, Cividale del Friuli, Udine	Rachele Sangiuliano, former volleyball player; Lodovica Comello, actress and singer; Michele Antonutti, former basketball player; Luigi De Agostini, former footballer; Andrea Kimi Antonelli, Formula One Driver
Belluno	49	25 Jan 2026	Veneto	Udine, Pordenone, Borgo Palù, Conegliano, Vittorio Veneto, Valdobbiadene, Feltre, Trichiana, Belluno	Francesca Porcellato, cross-country skier, cyclist, and wheelchair racer; Monica De Gennaro, former volleyball player; Giada Rossi, table tennis player; Davide Giozet, tennis player; Hudson Williams, actor; Connor Storrie, actor
Cortina d'Ampezzo	50	26 Jan 2026	Veneto	Belluno, Farra d'Alpago, Ponte nelle Alpi, Vajont, Longarone, Pieve d'Alpago, Valle di Cadore, San Vito di Cadore, Cortina d'Ampezzo	Giacomo Agostini, former motorcycle racer; Carlo Calzà, speed skater
Bolzano	51	27 Jan 2026	Trentino-Alto Adige/Südtirol	Cortina d'Ampezzo, Tre Cime di Lavaredo, Lake Misurina, Dobbiaco, Villabassa, South Tyrol Arena, Brunico, Rasun di Sotto, Plan de Corones, Bressanone, Bolzano	Kristian Ghedina, former alpine skier; Carolina Kostner, figure skater; Tania Cagnotto, diver; Gustav Thöni, former alpine skier
Cavalese	52	28 Jan 2026	Trentino-Alto Adige/Südtirol	Bolzano, Ortisei, Canazei, Campitello di Fassa, Lago di Carezza, Soraga di Fassa, Moena, Predazzo, Cavalese	Cristian Zorzi, former cross-country skier; Franco Nones, former cross-country skier; Alessandra Reppucci, alpine skier
Trento	53	29 Jan 2026	Trentino-Alto Adige/Südtirol	Cavalese, Merano, Terlano, Appiano, Caldaro, Baselga di Piné, Mezzocorona, Termeno, Trento	Amos Mosaner, curler; Orietta Bertò, curler; Ruggero Tita, sailor; Matteo Anesi, speed skater; Nadia Battocletti, runner
Livigno	54	30 Jan 2026	Lombardy	Trento, Cles, Lake Tovel, Malè, Croviana, Dimaro Folgarida, Passo del Tonale, Madonna di Campiglio, Ghiacciaio Presena, Ponte di Legno, Aprica, Livigno	Giorgio Rocca, former alpine skier; Elisa Maria Nakab, freestyle skier; Federica Sosio, alpine skier; Daniel Pedranzini, cross-country skier
Sondrio	55	31 Jan 2026	Lombardy	Livigno, Bormio, Valdisotto, Madesimo, Tirano, Sondrio	Simone Bertini, runner; Claudio Pedrazzini, former skier
Lecco	56	1 Feb 2026	Lombardy	Sondrio, Berbenno di Valtellina, Ronco, Ardenno, Varenna, Menaggio, Bellagio, Morbegno, Colico, Mandello del Lario, Abbadia Lariana, Lecco	Nausicaa Dell'Orto, flag footballer; Ematoshi, sports commentator; Piero Poli, former rower
Bergamo	57	2 Feb 2026	Lombardy	Lecco, Grignetta, Villa d'Almè, Ponteranica, Alzano Lombardo, Nembro, Seriate, Bergamo	Martina Caironi, runner; Giorgio Pasotti, actor; Paoletta Magoni, former alpine skier
Como	58	3 Feb 2026	Lombardy	Bergamo, Dalmine, Capriate San Gervasio, Trezzo sull'Adda, Paderno d'Adda, Robbiate, Merate, Crespi d'Adda, Vimercate, Arcore, Lesmo, Seregno, Meda, Cantù, Cernobbio, Como	Javier Zanetti, former footballer; Alisha Lehmann, footballer; Riccardo Moraschini, basketball player; Cesc Fàbregas, former footballer
Monza	59	4 Feb 2026	Lombardy	Como, Gallarate, Rho, Busto Arsizio, Castellanza, Legnano, Saronno, Seveso, Desio, Nova Milanese, Muggiò, Lissone, Monza	Paolo Nespoli, astronaut; Filippo Tortu, sprinter; Arianna Errigo, fencer; Diana Bianchedi, former fencer
Milan	60	5 Feb 2026	Lombardy	Monza, Sesto San Giovanni, Cologno Monzese, Vimodrone, Segrate, Pioltello, San Donato Milanese, Milan	Flavia Pennetta, former tennis player; Francesca Schiavone, former tennis player; Luca Parmitano, astronaut; Gianluca Torre, television personality
Milan	60	6 Feb 2026	Lombardy	Milan (opening ceremony at San Siro)	Park Sung-hoon, singer, and former figure skater; Giuseppe Bergomi, former footballer; Franco Baresi, former footballer; Anna Danesi, volleyball player; Simone Giannelli, volleyball player; Manuela Di Centa, former cross-county skier; Gerda Weißensteiner, former luger and bobsleigh pilot; Enrico Fabris, former long track speed skater; Deborah Compagnoni, former alpine skier; Alberto Tomba, former alpine skier
Cortina d'Ampezzo	60	6 Feb 2026	Veneto	Cortina d'Ampezzo (opening ceremony at Dibona square)	Gustav Thöni, former alpine skier; Sofia Goggia, alpine skier
