= Bresimo =

- Comune
- Comune di Bresimo
- Location within Italy Location within Trentino-Alto Adige/Südtirol
- Coordinates: 46°25′N 10°58′E
- Country: Italy
- Region: Trentino-Alto Adige/Südtirol
- Province: Trentino (TN)

Government
  - Mayor: Ivo Dalla Torre

Area
  - Total: 41.01 km^{2} (15.83 sq mi)
- Elevation: 1,036 m (3,399 ft)

Population (2026)
  - Total: 240
  - Density: 5.9/km^{2} (15/sq mi)
- Time zone: UTC+1 (CET)
  - Summer (DST): UTC+2 (CEST)
- Postal code: 38020
- Dialing code: 0463
- Website: Official website

Bresimo (Brésem, /ˈbrezem/ in local dialect) is a comune (municipality) in Trentino in the northern Italian region Trentino-Alto Adige/Südtirol, located about 40 kilometres (25 mi) northwest of Trento.

Bresimo borders the following municipalities: Ulten, Rumo, Rabbi, Livo, Cis, Malè, and Caldes.

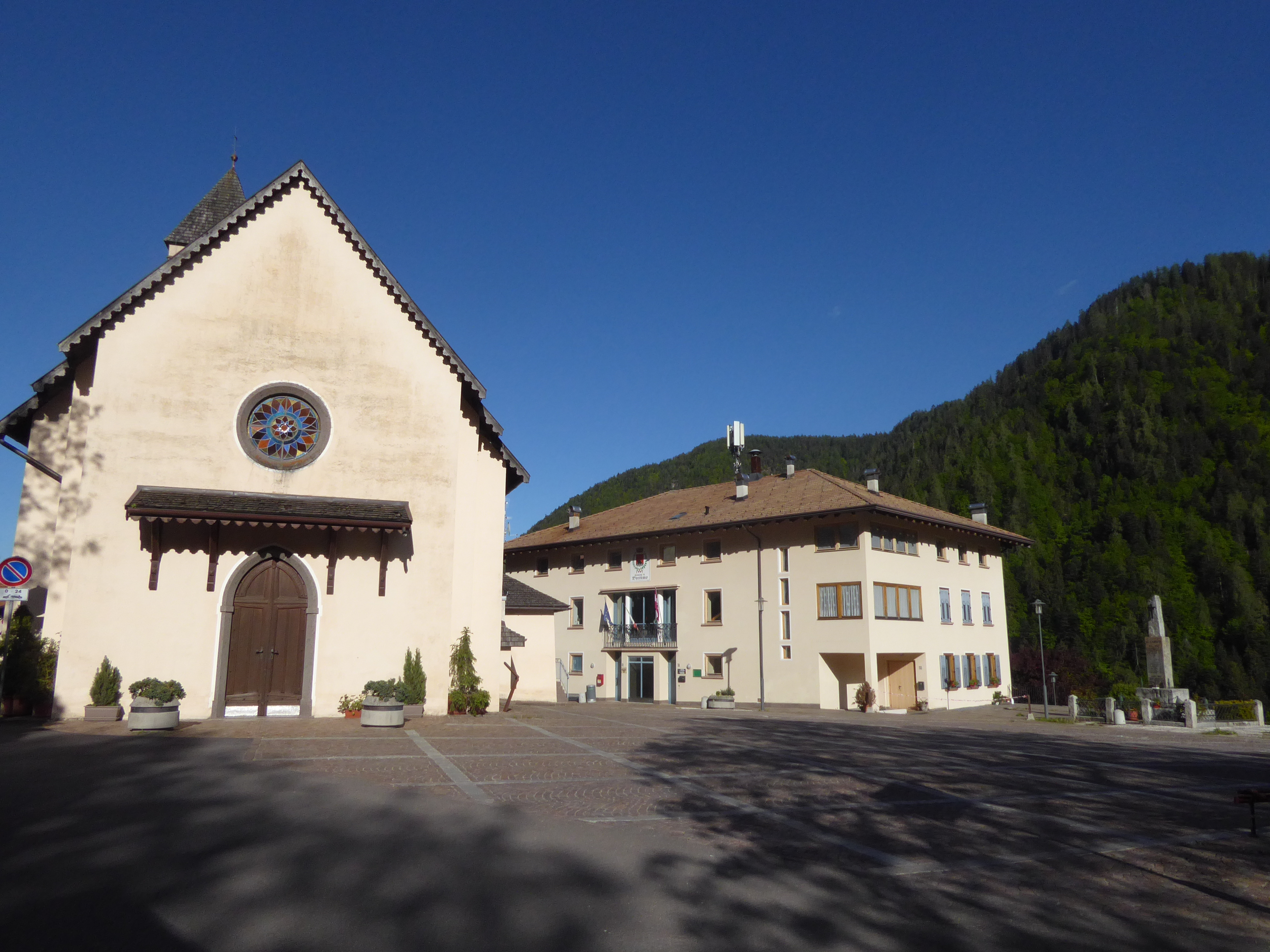
The square in Fontana Nuova, with the church and the town hall in Bresimo, Trentino, Italy.
