= Dimaro Folgarida =

- Comune
- Comune di Dimaro Folgarida
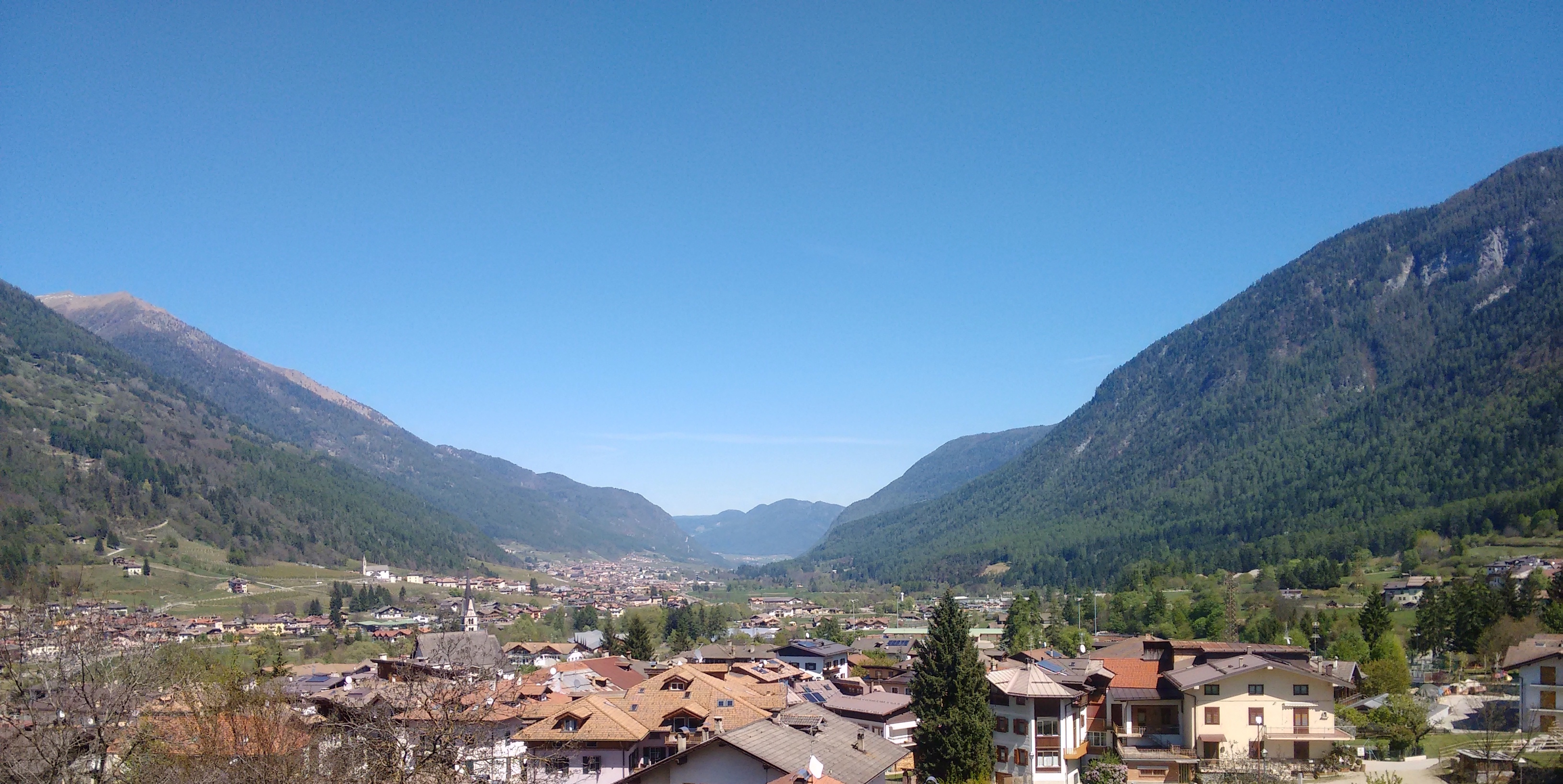

- Coat of arms

- Location within Italy Location within Trentino-Alto Adige/Südtirol
- Coordinates: 46°19′33″N 10°52′28″E
- Country: Italy
- Region: Trentino-Alto Adige/Südtirol
- Province: Trentino (TN)

Government
  - Mayor: Marco Panciera

Area
  - Total: 36.53 km^{2} (14.10 sq mi)
- Elevation: 766 m (2,513 ft)

Population (2026)
  - Total: 2,130
  - Density: 58.3/km^{2} (151/sq mi)
- Time zone: UTC+1 (CET)
  - Summer (DST): UTC+2 (CEST)
- Postal code: 38025
- Dialing code: 0463
- Website: Official website

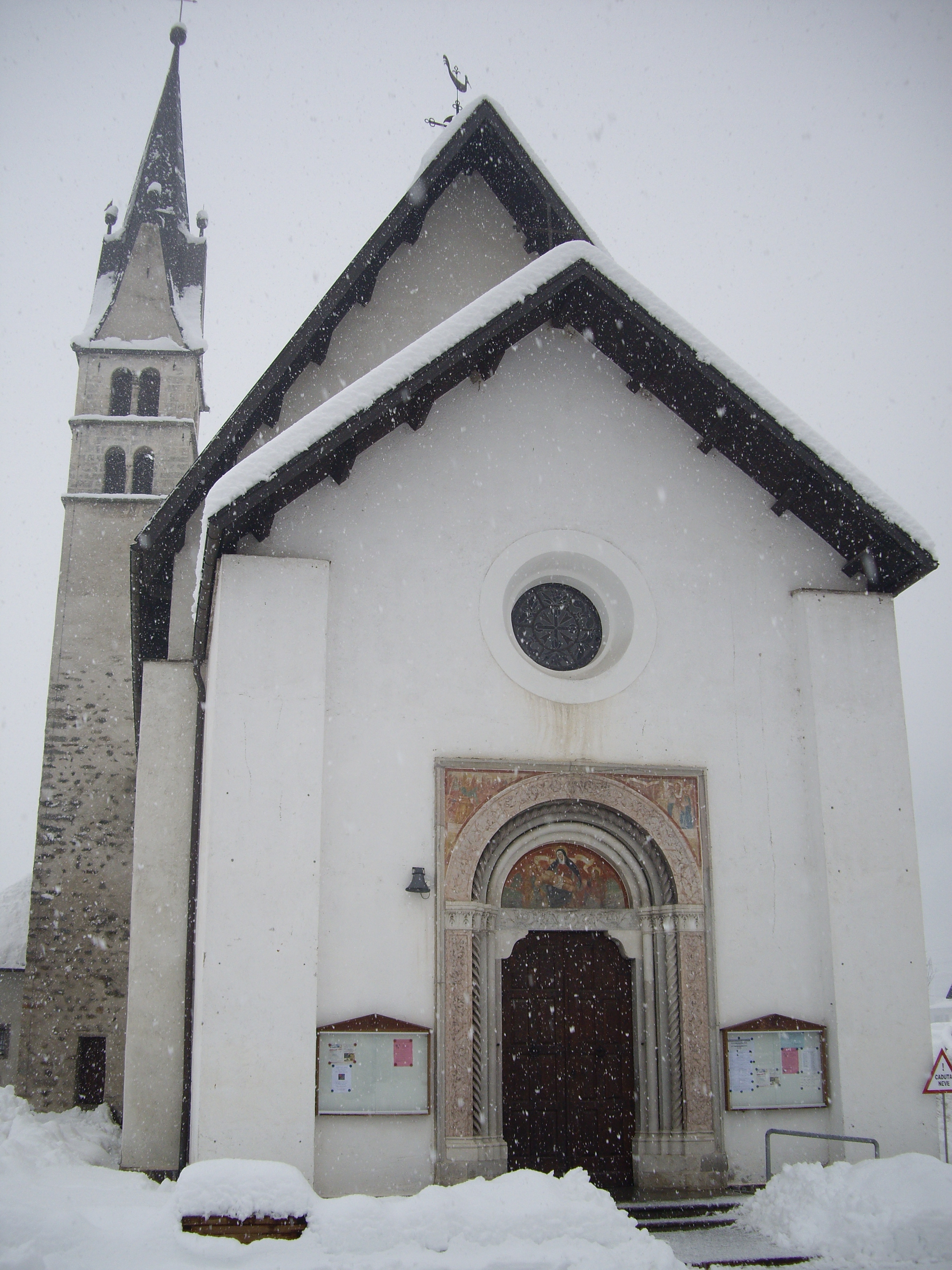
Dimaro Church

Dimaro Folgarida is a comune in Trentino in the northern Italian region Trentino-Alto Adige/Südtirol, located about 34 kilometres (21 mi) northwest of the provincial capital Trento. As of 1 January 2015, it had a population of 2,206 and an area of 36.53 square kilometres (14.10 mi^{2}).

Dimaro Folgarida borders the following municipalities: Cles, Commezzadura, Croviana, Malè, Pinzolo, Ville d'Anaunia.

The comune was established on 1 January 2016 after the merger of the municipalities of Dimaro and Monclassico.
