= Monclassico =

- Comune
- Comune di Monclassico
- Location within Italy Location within Trentino-Alto Adige/Südtirol
- Coordinates: 46°20′N 10°53′E
- Country: Italy
- Region: Trentino-Alto Adige/Südtirol
- Province: Trentino (TN)
- Frazioni: Presson

Area
  - Total: 8.7 km^{2} (3.4 sq mi)
- Elevation: 770 m (2,530 ft)

Population (Dec. 2004)
  - Total: 811
  - Density: 93/km^{2} (240/sq mi)
- Time zone: UTC+1 (CET)
  - Summer (DST): UTC+2 (CEST)
- Postal code: 38020
- Dialing code: 0463

Monclassico (Solandro: Monclàsech) is a comune (municipality) in Trentino in the northern Italian region Trentino-Alto Adige/Südtirol, located about 60 kilometres (37 mi) northwest of Trento. As of 31 December 2004, it had a population of 811 and an area of 8.7 square kilometres (3.4 mi^{2}).

The municipality of Monclassico contains the frazione (subdivision) Presson.

Monclassico borders the following municipalities: Malè, Cles, Croviana and Dimaro.

== Demographic evolution ==
Historical population

Year	Pop.	±%
1861	?	—
1871	?	—
1881	?	—
1901	?	—
1911	?	—

Year	Pop.	±%
1921	689	—
1931	667	−3.2%
1936	629	−5.7%
1951	686	+9.1%
1961	662	−3.5%

Year	Pop.	±%
1971	705	+6.5%
1981	684	−3.0%
1991	715	+4.5%
2001	751	+5.0%

Source: Data from ISTAT
