= Croviana =

- Comune
- Comune di Croviana
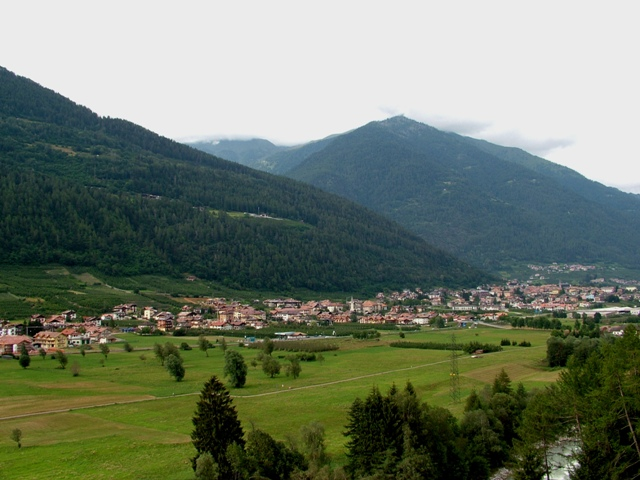

- Location within Italy Location within Trentino-Alto Adige/Südtirol
- Coordinates: 46°21′N 10°54′E
- Country: Italy
- Region: Trentino-Alto Adige/Südtirol
- Province: Trentino (TN)
- Frazioni: Liciasa, Carbonara

Government
  - Mayor: Gianluca Valorz

Area
  - Total: 5.1 km^{2} (2.0 sq mi)
- Elevation: 721 m (2,365 ft)

Population (2026)
  - Total: 677
  - Density: 130/km^{2} (340/sq mi)
- Demonym: Croviani
- Time zone: UTC+1 (CET)
  - Summer (DST): UTC+2 (CEST)
- Postal code: 38027
- Dialing code: 0463
- ISTAT code: 022068
- Patron saint: Sant George
- Saint day: April 23
- Website: Official website

Croviana (local dialect: Croviàna) is a comune (municipality) in Trentino in the northern Italian region Trentino-Alto Adige/Südtirol, located about 35 kilometres (22 mi) northwest of Trento. Croviana borders the following municipalities: Malè, Cles and Dimaro Folgarida

The village of Croviana is an ancient settlement located in the valley floor, historically serving as an agricultural, artisanal, and commercial center. Its location also makes it attractive from a tourist perspective. The village is divided into three areas: Carbonara to the southeast, Liciasa to the southwest towards Monclassico, and Croviana to the north towards Malé.

The origins of Croviana date back to the 1200s, when the toponym was documented for the first time. It derives from the Latin name Corvius with the suffix -ana. Located in the Val di Sole, the territory of Croviana was a Roman colony and hosted human settlements since prehistoric times.

== Demographic evolution ==
Historical population

Year	Pop.	±%
1921	332	—
1931	357	+7.5%
1936	373	+4.5%
1951	417	+11.8%

Year	Pop.	±%
1961	428	+2.6%
1971	464	+8.4%
1981	450	−3.0%
1991	506	+12.4%

Year	Pop.	±%
2001	597	+18.0%
2004	612	+2.5%
2014	689	+12.6%
2024	687	−0.3%

Source: Data from ISTAT

== Monuments ==
=== Religious Architecture ===
Church of San Giorgio. The church, located beside the main road, is noteworthy for its architecture and the works of art it contains. It is mentioned in the 14th century and was rebuilt in the beautiful Gothic style we see today around the late 15th century or early 16th century. The fresco in the tympanum (Saint George; with the Caldes Castle in the background) is from 1611. The tombstone next to the door is from 1551. The interior features a single nave: the ribs of the vaulted ceiling rest on half-columns, without capitals, or in the apse, on anthropomorphic brackets. The decoration is floral. Notable is the Baroque chapel of the Pezzen family, who had their coat of arms prominently displayed there. The ceiling and lunettes feature frescoes from 1661, depicting stories of the Madonna and musical angels (note the details). The wooden altar was commissioned in 1613 by G.B. Pezzen, Baron of Altspaur and Belfort. It features a beautiful 17th-century painting of the Madonna with Saints George and Margaret. To the right of the chapel is a painted panel (18th century) of the crowned Madonna with Saints George, Margaret, Sebastian, and Roch.

=== Military Architecture ===
Castle of Croviana. Near the church stands the 17th-century Pezzen Castle, a family from Valtellina. This noble residence, with a square tower to the northeast, an angular turret, a beautiful Baroque portal, traces of frescoes, and a hall, was, after the Pezzen family, owned by the Thun family and later by the Taddei de Salis family from Tirano. A curious episode is told about a monumental stove in the castle, where a volunteer from the Free Corps hid for several days, with the benevolent complicity of the de Salis family, known Lombard patriots, after the unfortunate battle of Malé on April 20, 1848. In the basement, there is said to be a hidden treasure, and the souls of the "evil castle dwellers" are said to be turned into toads.

Additionally, next to the church is a Monument to the Fallen, commemorating the victims of both World War I and World War II from the village.

Croviana Airport. In Croviana, there was also an airport hastily constructed by the Austrians in 1917, by laying wooden planks on a field in a flat area. This was the base from which aircraft took off during the Great War to "spy" on and photograph the Italian soldiers and their movements in the border area of Lombardy. The Croviana airport, now forgotten, is little more than a white strip of land amidst the green fields surrounding the few houses of the village.

== Culture ==
=== Education ===
==== Croviana Primary School "Bartolomeo Pezzen" ====
The Croviana school building is housed in a recently constructed facility, designed to be functional and well-organized. The school spans four floors and includes seven classrooms, a computer lab, a practical activities lab, a support classroom, a gymnasium (also used by external visitors), and a school canteen. Additionally, the school is equipped with its own photovoltaic system.

Located in the center of Croviana, the school is part of the Comprehensive Institute Bassa Val di Sole "G. Ciccolini," which includes the primary schools of Croviana, Malé, Caldes, Dimaro, and Rabbi, as well as the lower secondary school in Malé.

The school's identification code is TNEE833036.

==== MMape – The Bee Mill Museum ====
The Bee Mill Museum (MMape), inaugurated in 2014, is housed within an old mill located in the protected area of the Ontaneta di Croviana. This museum was established through the collaboration of the Municipality of Croviana, the Beekeepers' Association, and the Edmund Mach Foundation, with the aim of promoting and enhancing mountain beekeeping and the fascinating world of bees.

MMape offers visitors a unique interactive experience, allowing them to explore the habits of bees and their crucial role in the ecosystem. Through guided tours, visitors can observe the life cycle of bees, learn about the daily dangers they face, and participate in tastings of various local honeys.

The museum also serves as the headquarters of the Beekeepers' Association of the Sole, Peio, and Rabbi Valleys, which supports over 140 small beekeepers in the region. MMape is committed to raising public awareness about the importance of protecting these insects, which are essential for biodiversity and food production

== Associations ==
=== Volunteer Firefighters of Croviana ===
The Volunteer Firefighters Corps of Croviana was founded in 1881 in response to the need to ensure the safety of the Croviana community. Its establishment was prompted by the issuance of the fire prevention regulations by Emperor Franz Joseph I. Since its foundation, the Corps has played a central role in civil protection within the territory, undertaking numerous interventions with dedication and commitment, including fires, floods, road accidents, and other emergency situations.

Over the years, the Corps has enhanced its resources and operational capabilities, evolving alongside the community's needs. The organization has always been characterized by a strong spirit of volunteerism and active citizen participation, which have contributed to its continuous strengthening and growth. The Corps has also collaborated with other civil protection agencies and associations, playing a crucial role in managing local and regional emergencies.

The Croviana Firefighters Corps is equipped with modern vehicles and equipment, including fire trucks, off-road vehicles, and technical rescue tools such as pumps, road accident equipment, and personal protective devices. These resources enable the volunteers to respond promptly and effectively to various emergency situations.

The Volunteer Firefighters of Croviana are part of the Federation of Volunteer Firefighters of the Autonomous Province of Trento and the Val di Sole District Union, which includes volunteer firefighter units from several municipalities in the valley, such as Caldes, Cavizzana, Commezzadura, Dimaro, Malé, Mezzana, Monclassico, Ossana, Peio, Pellizzano, Rabbi, Terzolas, and Vermiglio. The District Union coordinates prevention and intervention activities, promoting operational efficiency among the Corps and solidarity among volunteers.

The new barracks for the Volunteer Firefighters of Croviana was inaugurated on 14 September 2013. Located on Via Nazionale at the border with Malé, the facility was built in a year and a half, with an investment of approximately 1.5 million euros.

In 2016, the Croviana Firefighters Corps officially established the Junior Firefighters Group.

=== Associazione Sportiva Croviana ===
The "Associazione Sportiva Croviana" is a local youth volunteer group founded in the 1980s by a group of young people from Croviana who wanted to create a place for socializing, community building, and mutual support. Despite its name, it is not simply a sports association but a broader social and cultural organization aimed at engaging youth in various activities.

Initially focused on social events such as dance evenings and games, the group has expanded its scope to include hiking, sports tournaments, volunteering, and cultural projects. Working closely with other local organizations, including the Volunteer Firefighters of Croviana, and local authorities, the group fosters solidarity, active participation, and community cohesion.

Key activities include:

- Trekking in the surrounding mountains.
- Summer sports tournaments like five-a-side football, beach volleyball, and volleyball.
- Film screenings and thematic evenings at the Busetti Hall.
- Volunteering and charity projects in collaboration with local entities.
- Celebrations of local festivals and traditions.

The group continues to grow, aiming to involve more young people and to increase its social and environmental initiatives, with a focus on sustainability and support for new generations.

Events organized by "Associazione Sportiva Croviana" are regularly published on the official Facebook page of the Municipality of Croviana and are also communicated via flyers and word of mouth within the community.

== Infrastructure and Transport ==
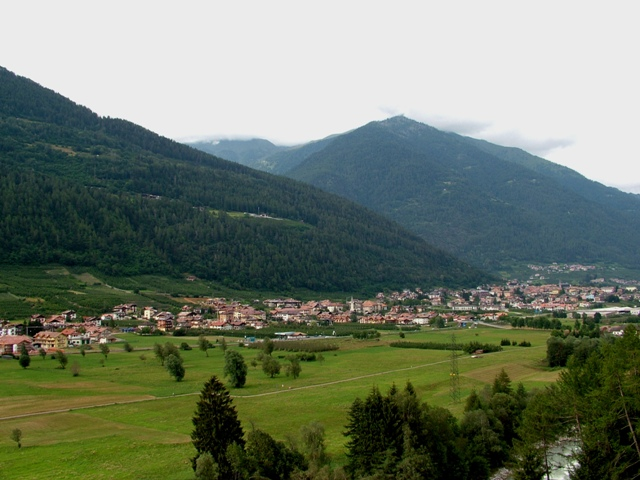
Croviana in Spring

The village is crossed by the Trento–Malè–Mezzana railway, inaugurated in 1964 to replace the pre-existing tramway, and is served by the Croviana Station. The station is the first stop on the Malé-Mezzana railway extension, inaugurated in 2003.

Croviana also has two bus stops: one in front of the elementary school and another at Via Nazionale 174.

== Sports ==
The Croviana Adventure Center offers a wide range of outdoor activities suitable for families and sports enthusiasts. Fun activities such as paintball and bubble football provide opportunities for competition and entertainment among friends. For those who enjoy traditional sports, the center features archery, a five-a-side football pitch, a tennis court, and a beach volleyball court. Adventurous visitors can try canyoning, trekking, and mountain biking, thanks to the many trails and cycling paths in the area. In 1993, the Croviana sports center, located along the Noce River, was also the starting point for the trials of the World Canoe/Kayak Downhill Championships.

The center also offers large green spaces for games and outdoor activities. During the summer, Croviana becomes an ideal meeting place for hikes, picnics, and spending time in nature.

== Administration ==
Term start	Term end	Name	Party/List	Office
4 June 1995	14 May 2000	Flavio Sartori	Civic list – "Insieme"	Mayor
14 May 2000	9 May 2005	Flavio Sartori	Civic list – "Insieme"	Mayor
9 May 2005	16 May 2010	Flavio Sartori	Civic list – "Insieme"	Mayor
16 May 2010	10 May 2015	Laura Ricci	Civic list – "Croviana Partecipa"	Mayor
10 May 2015	21 September 2020	Laura Ricci	Civic list – "Croviana Partecipa"	Mayor
21 September 2020	4 May 2025	Gianluca Valorz	Civic list – "Vivi Croviana"	Mayor
4 May 2025	incumbent	Gianluca Valorz	Civic list – "Vivi Croviana"	Mayor
