= Tommaso Cassissa =

Italian actor, comedian and internet personality

- Cassissa in 2024
- Born: 11 February 2000 (age 26); Genoa, Italy
- Occupations: Actor; comedian; YouTuber
- Years active: 2017–present

Tommaso Cassissa (born 11 February 2000), also known as Tommy Cassi, is an Italian actor, comedian and internet personality.

Born in Genoa, he began posting videos on YouTube as a child and later gained popularity through comedy sketches on social media. In 2020, Cassissa made his television presenting debut with the children's game show Boing Challenge on Boing. He made his feature-film debut as the lead actor in Un oggi alla volta (2024), directed by Nicola Conversa, and appeared in Alessandro Siani's comedy film Io e te dobbiamo parlare the same year. In 2025, he competed in the fifth season of the comedy show LOL - Chi ride è fuori on Amazon Prime Video.

In 2024, Cassissa received the Performance Award in the Entertainment category at the Top Creators Awards, organised by Forbes Italia and Buzzoole. In 2026, he received the Nuovo Imaie Award at the Nastri d'Argento, jointly with Adriano Moretti, for their performances in Notte prima degli esami 3.0.

In January 2026, Cassissa took part in the 2026 Winter Olympics torch relay, carrying the Olympic flame during its passage through Genoa.

== Filmography ==
Film
Year	Title	Role	Notes
2022	La bambola di pezza	Lorenzo	Short film
2024	Un oggi alla volta	Marco	Lead role
2024	Io e te dobbiamo parlare	Angelo Marsala	
2026	Notte prima degli esami 3.0	Giulio Sabatini	Lead role

Television
Year	Title	Role	Notes
2023	Pooh: Un attimo ancora	Andrea	Documentary
2025	Tutta scena	Christian	
2026	Super Market	Edoardo	Main role
