= Rumo, Trentino =

Rumo
- Comune
- Comune di Rumo
- Location within Italy Location within Trentino-Alto Adige/Südtirol
- Coordinates: 46°27′N 11°1′E
- Country: Italy
- Region: Trentino-Alto Adige/Südtirol
- Province: Trentino (TN)
- Frazioni: Lanza, Mocenigo, Corte Superiore, Corte Inferiore, Marcena, Mione

Government
  - Mayor: Michela Noletti

Area
  - Total: 30.8 km^{2} (11.9 sq mi)
- Elevation: 950–1,111 m (3,117–3,645 ft)

Population (Dec. 2004)
  - Total: 833
  - Density: 27.0/km^{2} (70.0/sq mi)
- Time zone: UTC+1 (CET)
  - Summer (DST): UTC+2 (CEST)
- Postal code: 38020
- Dialing code: 0463
- Website: Official website

Rumo (German: Räu or Run, Ladin: Rum) is a comune (municipality) in Trentino in the northern Italian region Trentino-Alto Adige/Südtirol, located about 45 kilometres (28 mi) north of Trento. As of 31 December 2004, it had a population of 833 and an area of 30.8 square kilometres (11.9 mi^{2}).

Rumo borders the following municipalities: Ulten, Proveis, Bresimo, Cagnò, Revò and Livo.

== Demographic evolution ==
Historical population

Year	Pop.	±%
1861	?	—
1871	?	—
1881	?	—
1901	?	—
1911	?	—

Year	Pop.	±%
1921	1,202	—
1931	1,123	−6.6%
1936	1,044	−7.0%
1951	1,137	+8.9%
1961	1,149	+1.1%

Year	Pop.	±%
1971	975	−15.1%
1981	865	−11.3%
1991	822	−5.0%
2001	811	−1.3%

Source: Data from ISTAT
