= Commezzadura =

- Comune
- Comune di Commezzadura
- Location within Italy Location within Trentino-Alto Adige/Südtirol
- Coordinates: 46°19′N 10°50′E
- Country: Italy
- Region: Trentino-Alto Adige/Südtirol
- Province: Trentino (TN)

Government
  - Mayor: Marco Podetti

Area
  - Total: 22.5 km^{2} (8.7 sq mi)

Population (2026)
  - Total: 1,005
  - Density: 44.7/km^{2} (116/sq mi)
- Time zone: UTC+1 (CET)
  - Summer (DST): UTC+2 (CEST)
- Postal code: 38020
- Dialing code: 0463
- Website: Official website

Commezzadura (local dialect: Comezadurå) is a comune (municipality) in Trentino in the northern Italian region Trentino-Alto Adige/Südtirol, located about 35 kilometres (22 mi) northwest of Trento. As of 31 December 2004, it had a population of 944 and an area of 22.5 square kilometres (8.7 mi^{2}).

Commezzadura borders the following municipalities: Rabbi, Malè, Mezzana, Dimaro Folgarida, and Pinzolo.

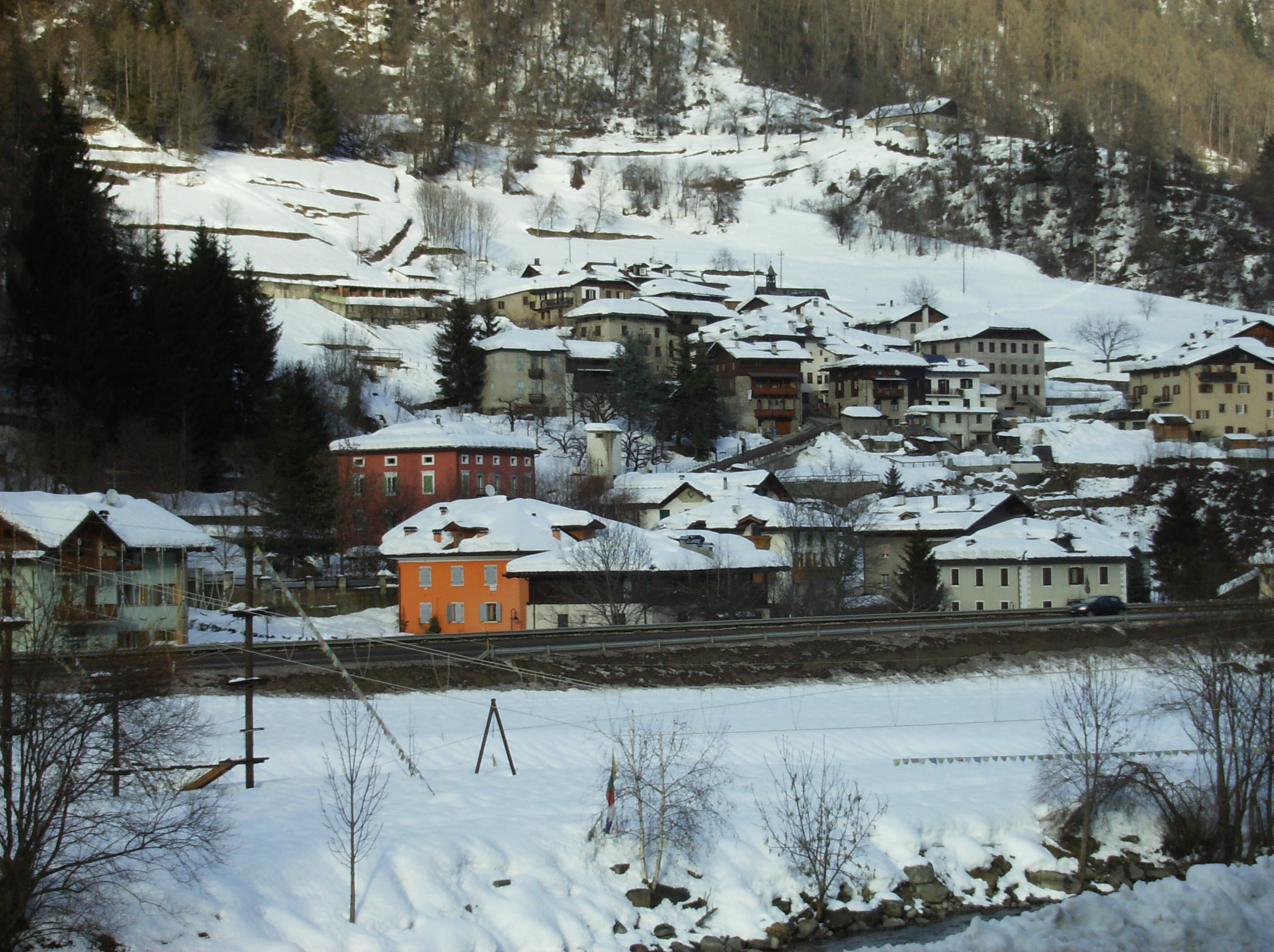
winter view of the town

== Demographic evolution ==
Historical population

Year	Pop.	±%
1861	?	—
1871	?	—
1881	?	—
1901	?	—
1911	?	—

Year	Pop.	±%
1921	865	—
1931	828	−4.3%
1936	855	+3.3%
1951	907	+6.1%
1961	924	+1.9%

Year	Pop.	±%
1971	880	−4.8%
1981	875	−0.6%
1991	906	+3.5%
2001	906	+0.0%

Source: Data from ISTAT
