= Cis, Trentino =

Cis
- Comune
- Comune di Cis
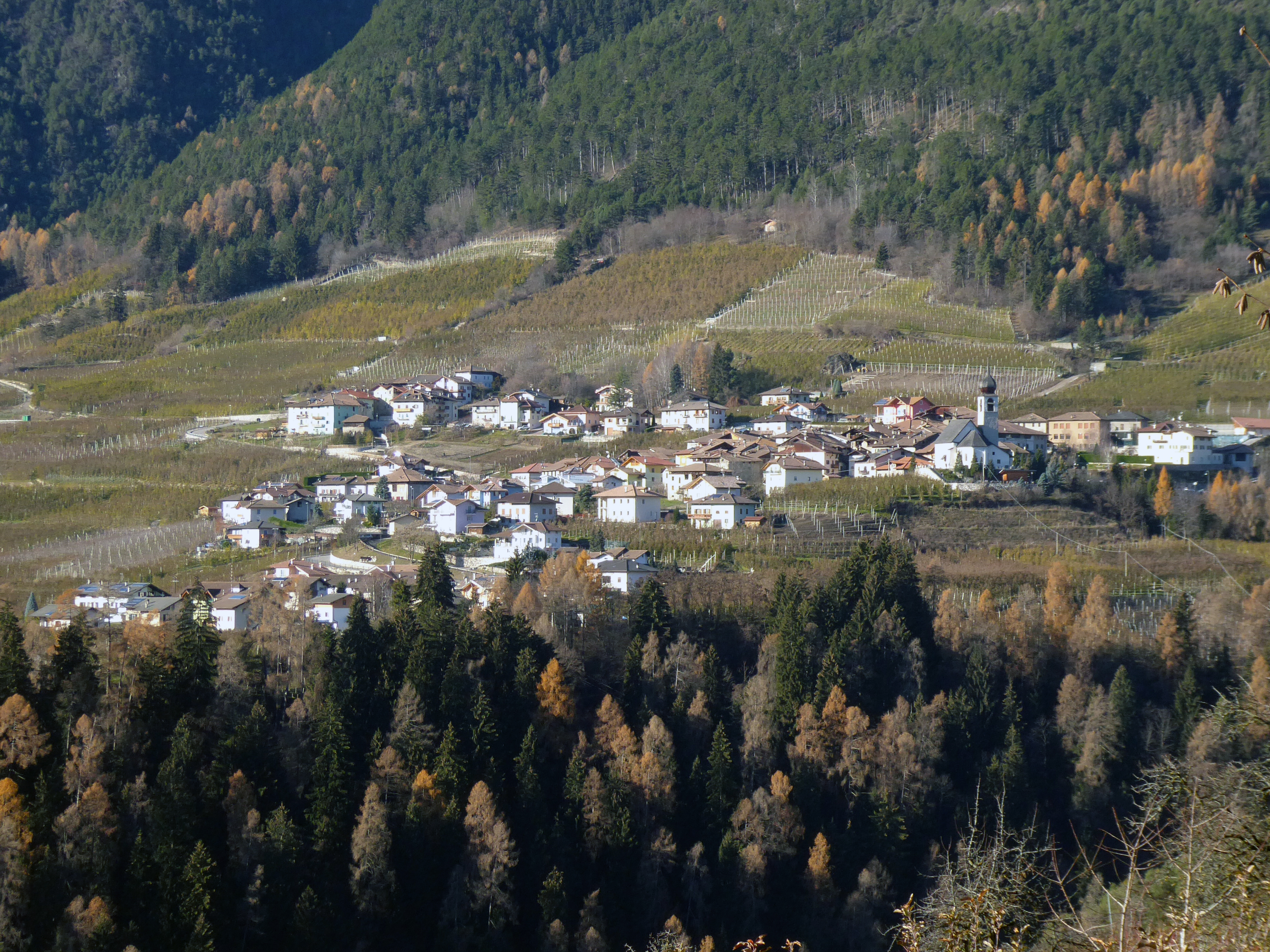
- Cis pictured from Varollo, Livo, Trentino

- Location within Italy Location within Trentino-Alto Adige/Südtirol
- Coordinates: 46°24′N 11°00′E
- Country: Italy
- Region: Trentino-Alto Adige/Südtirol
- Province: Trentino (TN)

Government
  - Mayor: Fabio Mengoni

Area
  - Total: 5.5 km^{2} (2.1 sq mi)

Population (2026)
  - Total: 294
  - Density: 53/km^{2} (140/sq mi)
- Time zone: UTC+1 (CET)
  - Summer (DST): UTC+2 (CEST)
- Postal code: 38020
- Dialing code: 0463
- Website: Official website

Cis is a comune (municipality) in Trentino in the northern Italian region Trentino-Alto Adige/Südtirol, located about 40 kilometres (25 mi) northwest of Trento. As of 31 December 2004, it had a population of 311 and an area of 5.5 square kilometres (2.1 mi^{2}).

Cis borders the following municipalities: Bresimo, Livo, Caldes, and Cles.

== Demographic evolution ==
Historical population

Year	Pop.	±%
1861	?	—
1871	?	—
1881	?	—
1901	?	—
1911	?	—

Year	Pop.	±%
1921	600	—
1931	480	−20.0%
1936	492	+2.5%
1951	454	−7.7%
1961	424	−6.6%

Year	Pop.	±%
1971	361	−14.9%
1981	341	−5.5%
1991	308	−9.7%
2001	299	−2.9%

Source: Data from ISTAT
