= Grignetta =

Mountain in Italy

Coordinates: 45°58′N 9°26′E

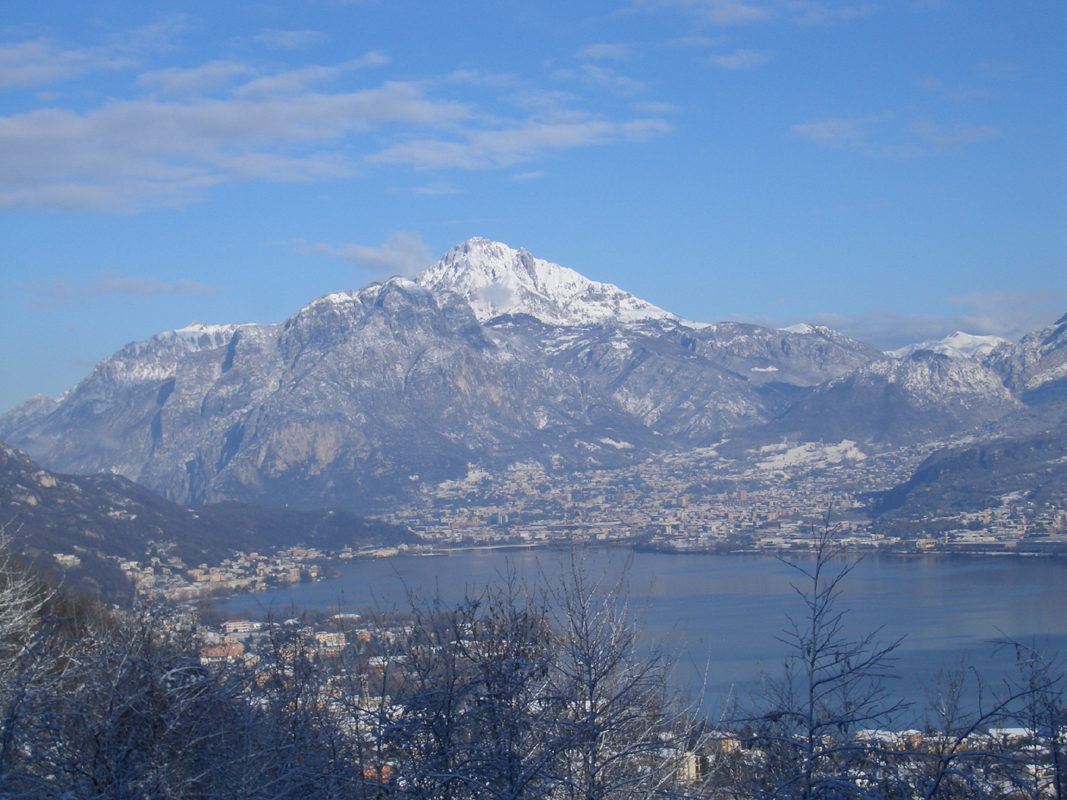
- The Grignetta seen from Consonno

Highest point
- Elevation: 2,184 m (7,165 ft)

Geography
- Location: Lombardy, Italy
- Parent range: Orobic Alps

The Grignetta, also known as Grigna Meridionale, is a mountain of Lombardy, Italy, with an elevation of 2,184 metres (7,165 ft). It is located in the Orobic Alps, in the Grigna massif.

It is located in the territory of Mandello del Lario, south of the Grigna and north of Pian dei Resinelli. It has four main ridges: Cresta Segantini to the west, Cresta Sinigaglia to the south-east, Cresta Cermenati to the south, and Cresta di Campione to the east; a fifth ridge, to the north, connects it to the Grigna.

Its many pinnacles have been a training ground for mountaineers such as Riccardo Cassin, Emilio Comici and Walter Bonatti.

A small mountain shelter, Bivacco Ferrario, is located on its peak, whereas a mountain hut (Rifugio Rosalba) is located farther down, at the foot of Cresta Segantini. The peak can be reached through various hiking paths and climbing routes.

== Rock formations ==
The main rock formations in the Grigna Meridionale (Grignetta) are:

- Sigaro Dones (1,980 m above sea level)
- Torrione Magnaghi Meridionale (First Magnaghi) (2,040 m above sea level)
- Torrione Magnaghi Centrale (Second Magnaghi) (2,045 m above sea level)
- Torrione Magnaghi Settentrionale (Third Magnaghi) (2,078 m above sea level)
- Campaniletto (1,730 m above sea level)
- La Torre (1,728 m above sea level)
- Il Fungo (1,713 m above sea level)
- La Lancia (1,730 m above sea level)
- Guglia Angelina (1,853 m above sea level)
- Ago Teresita (1,860 m above sea level)
- Torrione Clerici (1,930 m above sea level)
- Torrione Palma (1,928 m above sea level)
- Piramide Casati (1,940 m above sea level)
- Torrione del Cinquantenario (1,743 m above sea level)
- Torre Cecilia (1,800 m above sea level)
- Campaniletto del Rifugio (1,780 m above sea level)
- Punta Giulia (1,563 m above sea level)
- La Mongolfiera (1,771 m above sea level)
- Torre Costanza (1,723 m above sea level)
- Torrione del Pertusio (1,557 m above sea level)
- Torrione Vittorio Ratti (1,570 m above sea level)
- Il Dito (1,106 m above sea level)
