= Caldes =

- Comune
- Comune di Caldes
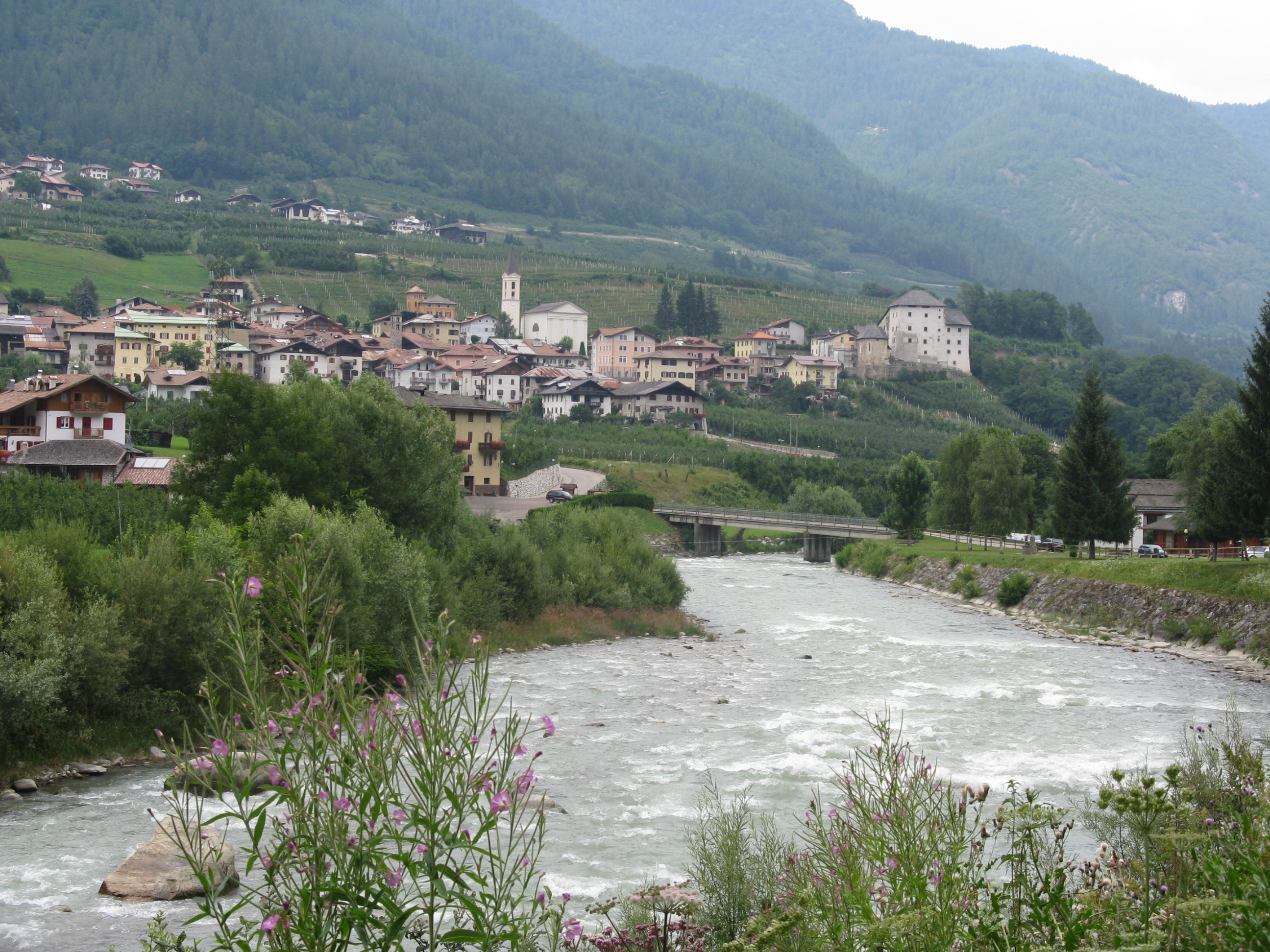

- Coat of arms

- Location within Italy Location within Trentino-Alto Adige/Südtirol
- Coordinates: 46°22′N 10°57′E
- Country: Italy
- Region: Trentino-Alto Adige/Südtirol
- Province: Trentino (TN)
- Frazioni: Bozzana, Bordiana, Tozzaga, Cassana, S. Giacomo, Samoclevo

Government
  - Mayor: Antonio Maini

Area
  - Total: 20.9 km^{2} (8.1 sq mi)

Population (2026)
  - Total: 1,122
  - Density: 53.7/km^{2} (139/sq mi)
- Demonym: Caudesi
- Time zone: UTC+1 (CET)
  - Summer (DST): UTC+2 (CEST)
- Postal code: 38022
- Dialing code: 0463
- Website: Official website

Caldes (Caudés or Cjaudés in local dialect) is a comune (municipality) in Trentino in the northern Italian region Trentino-Alto Adige/Südtirol, located about 35 kilometres (22 mi) northwest of Trento. As of 31 December 2004, it had a population of 1,049 and an area of 20.9 square kilometres (8.1 mi^{2}).

The municipality of Caldes contains the frazioni (subdivisions, mainly villages and hamlets) Bozzana, Bordiana, Tozzaga, Cassana, S. Giacomo, and Samoclevo.

Caldes borders the following municipalities: Bresimo, Cis, Malè, Cles, Terzolas, and Cavizzana. It is one of I Borghi più belli d'Italia ("The most beautiful villages of Italy").

== Demographic evolution ==
Historical population

Year	Pop.	±%
1861	?	—
1871	?	—
1881	?	—
1901	?	—
1911	?	—

Year	Pop.	±%
1921	1,557	—
1931	1,396	−10.3%
1936	1,233	−11.7%
1951	1,336	+8.4%
1961	1,246	−6.7%

Year	Pop.	±%
1971	1,083	−13.1%
1981	1,060	−2.1%
1991	1,028	−3.0%
2001	1,040	+1.2%

Source: Data from ISTAT
