= Livo, Trentino =

Livo
- Comune
- Comune di Livo
- Location within Italy Location within Trentino-Alto Adige/Südtirol
- Coordinates: 46°24′18″N 11°1′6″E
- Country: Italy
- Region: Trentino-Alto Adige/Südtirol
- Province: Trentino (TN)

Government
  - Mayor: Willi Zanotelli

Area
  - Total: 15.2 km^{2} (5.9 sq mi)

Population (2026)
  - Total: 774
  - Density: 50.9/km^{2} (132/sq mi)
- Time zone: UTC+1 (CET)
  - Summer (DST): UTC+2 (CEST)
- Postal code: 38020
- Dialing code: 0463
- Website: Official website

Livo (Liu or Lio in local dialect) is a comune (municipality) in Trentino in the northern Italian region Trentino-Alto Adige/Südtirol, located about 40 kilometres (25 mi) north of Trento. As of 31 December 2004, it had a population of 903 and an area of 15.2 square kilometres (5.9 mi^{2}).

Livo borders the following municipalities: Rumo, Bresimo, Cagnò, Cis and Cles.

== Demographic evolution ==
Historical population

Year	Pop.	±%
1861	?	—
1871	?	—
1881	?	—
1901	?	—
1911	?	—

Year	Pop.	±%
1921	1,159	—
1931	1,045	−9.8%
1936	1,036	−0.9%
1951	1,128	+8.9%
1961	1,081	−4.2%

Year	Pop.	±%
1971	964	−10.8%
1981	854	−11.4%
1991	830	−2.8%
2001	858	+3.4%

Source: Data from ISTAT
