= Dimaro =

- Comune
- Comune di Dimaro
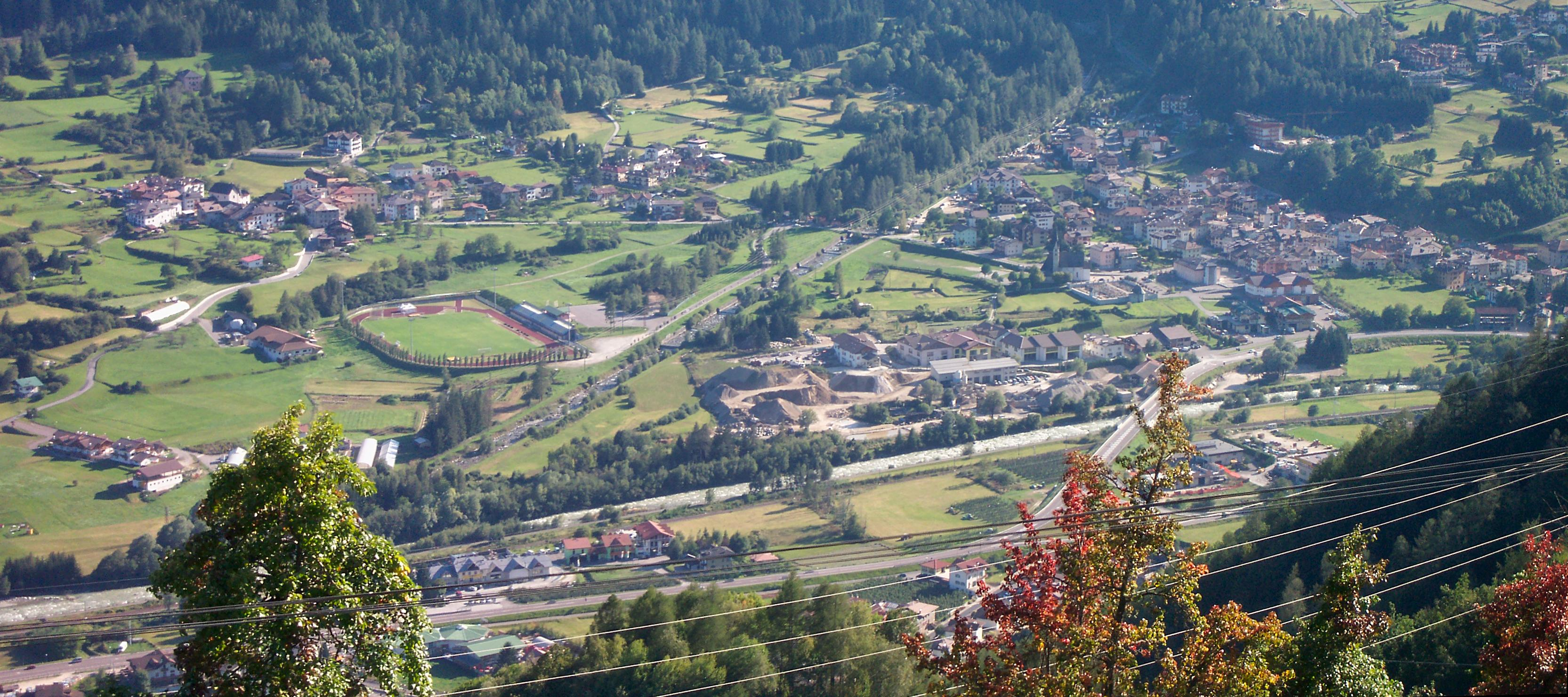
- View of Dimaro and Carciato from Bolentina.

- Coat of arms

- Location within Italy Location within Trentino-Alto Adige/Südtirol
- Coordinates: 46°20′N 10°52′E
- Country: Italy
- Region: Trentino-Alto Adige/Südtirol
- Province: Trentino (TN)
- Frazioni: Folgarida, Carciato

Area
  - Total: 28.3 km^{2} (10.9 sq mi)
- Elevation: 766 m (2,513 ft)

Population (Dec. 2004)
  - Total: 1,193
  - Density: 42.2/km^{2} (109/sq mi)
- Demonym: Dimari
- Time zone: UTC+1 (CET)
  - Summer (DST): UTC+2 (CEST)
- Postal code: 38025
- Dialing code: 0463
- Website: Official website

Dimaro (in local dialect: Dimàr) is a comune (municipality) in Trentino in the northern Italian region Trentino-Alto Adige/Südtirol, located about 66 kilometres (41 mi) northwest of Trento. As of 31 December 2004, it had a population of 1,193 and an area of 28.3 square kilometres (10.9 mi^{2}).

The municipality of Dimaro contains the frazioni (subdivisions, mainly villages and hamlets) Folgarida and Carciato.

Dimaro borders the following municipalities: Malè, Commezzadura, Monclassico.

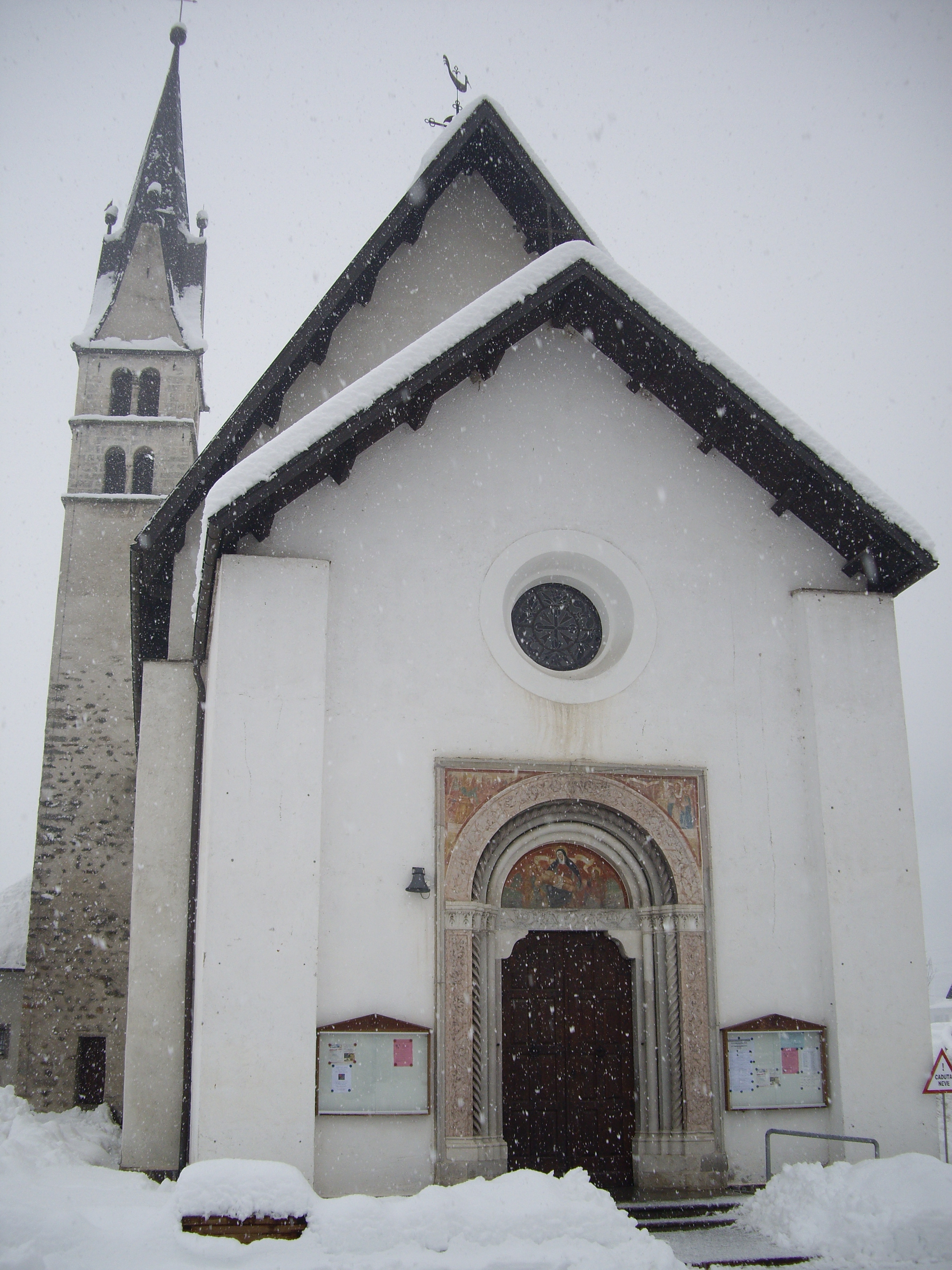
Church

== Demographic evolution ==
Historical population

Year	Pop.	±%
1861	?	—
1871	?	—
1881	?	—
1901	?	—
1911	?	—

Year	Pop.	±%
1921	665	—
1931	637	−4.2%
1936	651	+2.2%
1951	828	+27.2%
1961	800	−3.4%

Year	Pop.	±%
1971	909	+13.6%
1981	995	+9.5%
1991	1,054	+5.9%
2001	1,181	+12.0%

Source: Data from ISTAT
