= Rabbi, Trentino =

Rabbi Radi (Radden)
- Comune
- Comune di Rabbi
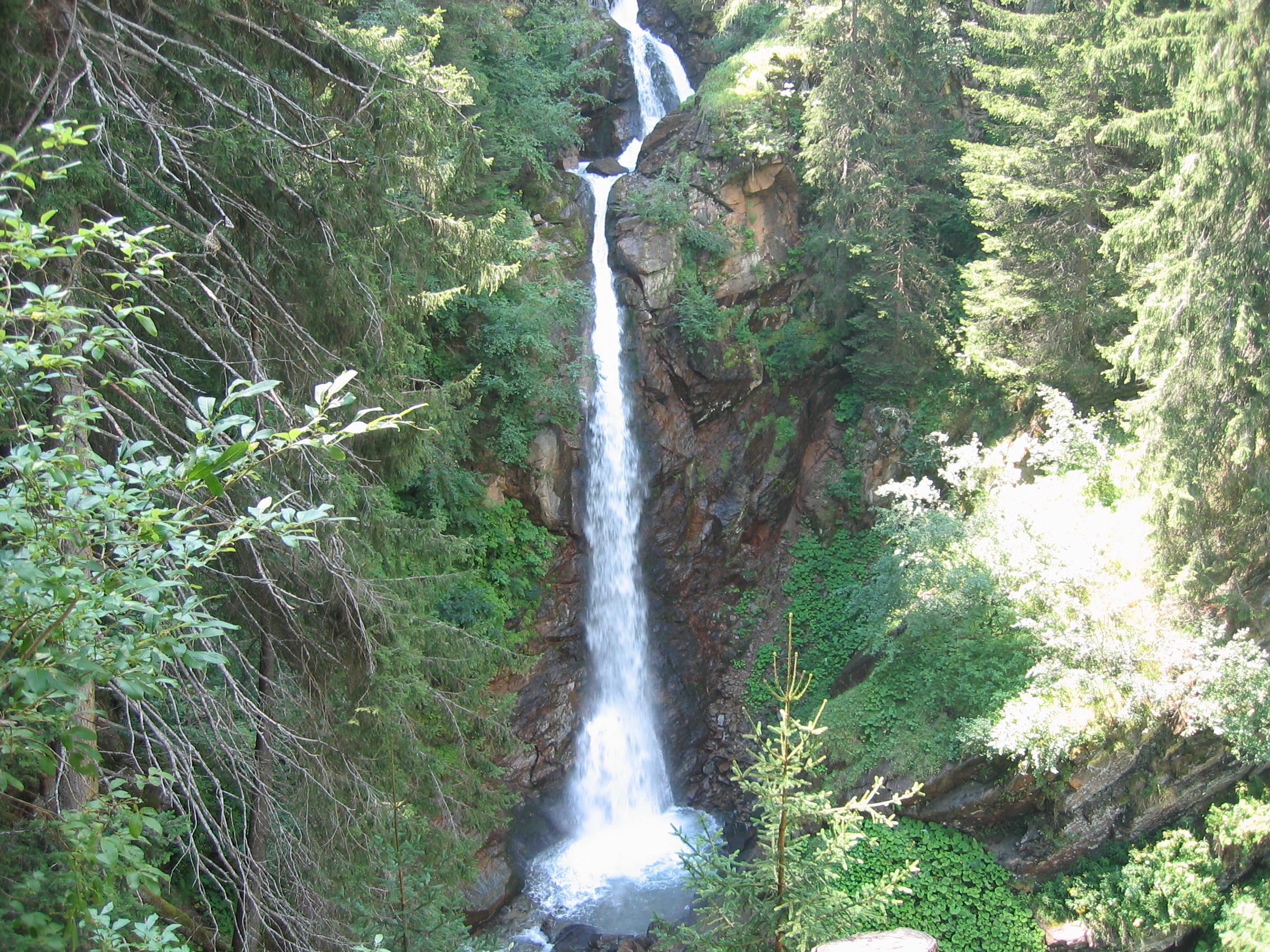
- A waterfall in summer in Rabbi

- Location within Italy Location within Trentino-Alto Adige/Südtirol
- Coordinates: 46°24′N 10°51′E
- Country: Italy
- Region: Trentino-Alto Adige/Südtirol
- Province: Trentino (TN)
- Frazioni: Piazzola, Pracorno, San Bernardo (Municipal Building)

Government
  - Mayor: Lorenzo Cicolini

Area
  - Total: 132.4 km^{2} (51.1 sq mi)

Population (Dec. 2004)
  - Total: 1,447
  - Density: 10.93/km^{2} (28.31/sq mi)
- Demonym(s): called "corvi" in San Bernardo, "chjaore" in Piazzola, and "gósi" in Pracorno
- Time zone: UTC+1 (CET)
  - Summer (DST): UTC+2 (CEST)
- Postal code: 38020
- Dialing code: 0463
- Patron saint: Our Lady of Caravaggio (Pracorno), San Bernardo (St. Bernard), St. John of Nepomuk
- Website: Official website

Rabbi (Rabi in local dialect) is a comune (municipality) in Trentino in the northern Italian region Trentino-Alto Adige/Südtirol, located about 40 kilometres (25 mi) northwest of Trento. As of 31 December 2004, it had a population of 1,447 and an area of 132.4 square kilometres (51.1 mi^{2}).

Rabbi borders the following municipalities: Ulten, Martell, Bresimo, Peio, Malè, Mezzana, Commezzadura and Pellizzano.

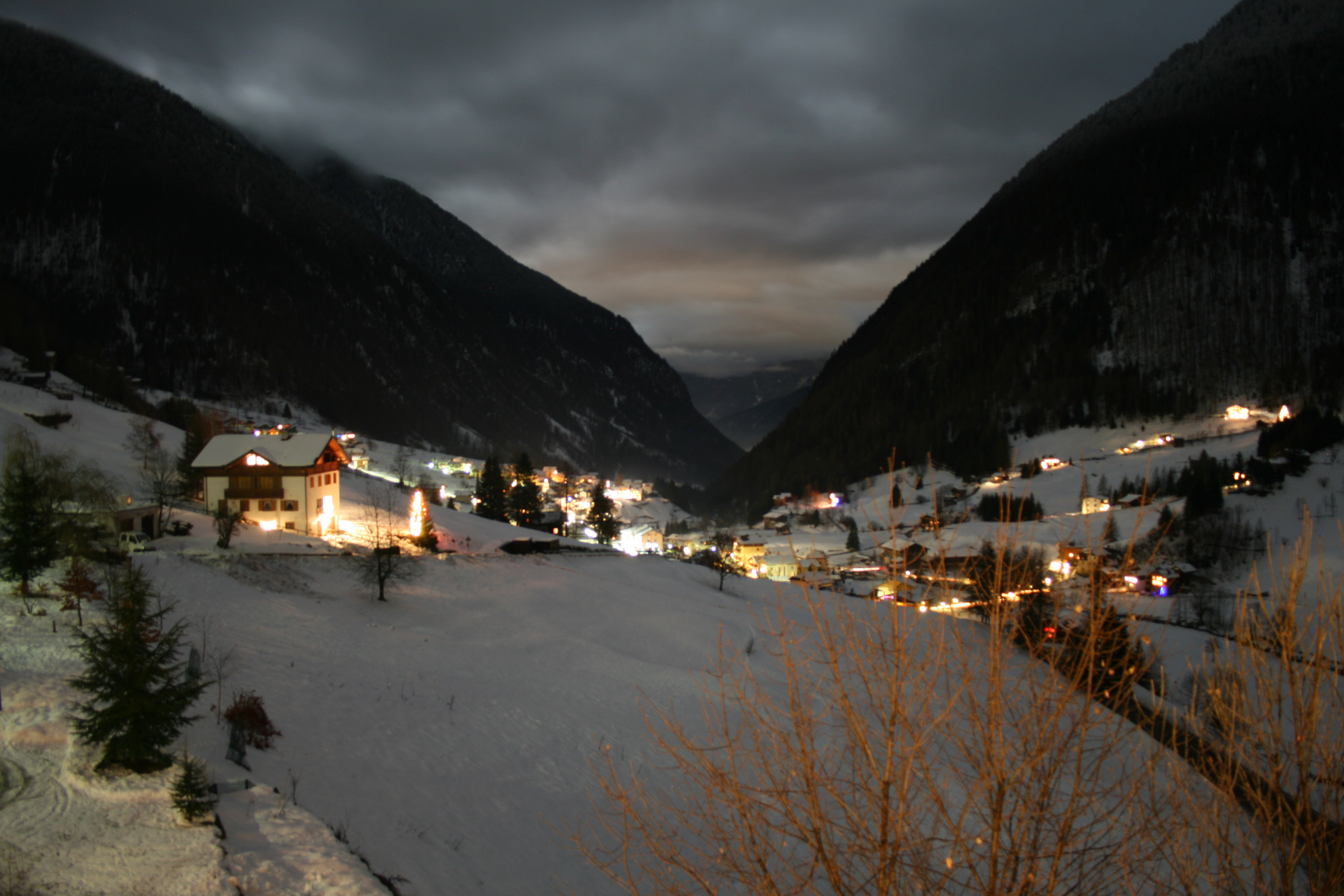
Rabbi at night

== Demographic evolution ==
Historical population

Year	Pop.	±%
1861	?	—
1871	?	—
1881	?	—
1901	?	—
1911	?	—

Year	Pop.	±%
1921	2,726	—
1931	2,547	−6.6%
1936	2,252	−11.6%
1951	2,314	+2.8%
1961	2,139	−7.6%

Year	Pop.	±%
1971	1,856	−13.2%
1981	1,638	−11.7%
1991	1,478	−9.8%
2001	1,456	−1.5%

Source: Data from ISTAT
