= Massimiliano Rota =

Italian bobsledder (born 1970)

Personal information
- Nationality: Italian
- Born: 6 June 1970 (age 54); Terni, Italy

Sport
- Sport: Bobsleigh

Massimiliano Rota (born 6 June 1970) is an Italian bobsledder. He competed at the 1998 Winter Olympics and the 2002 Winter Olympics.
