= Consonno =

Ghost town in Italy

- Ghost town and former village
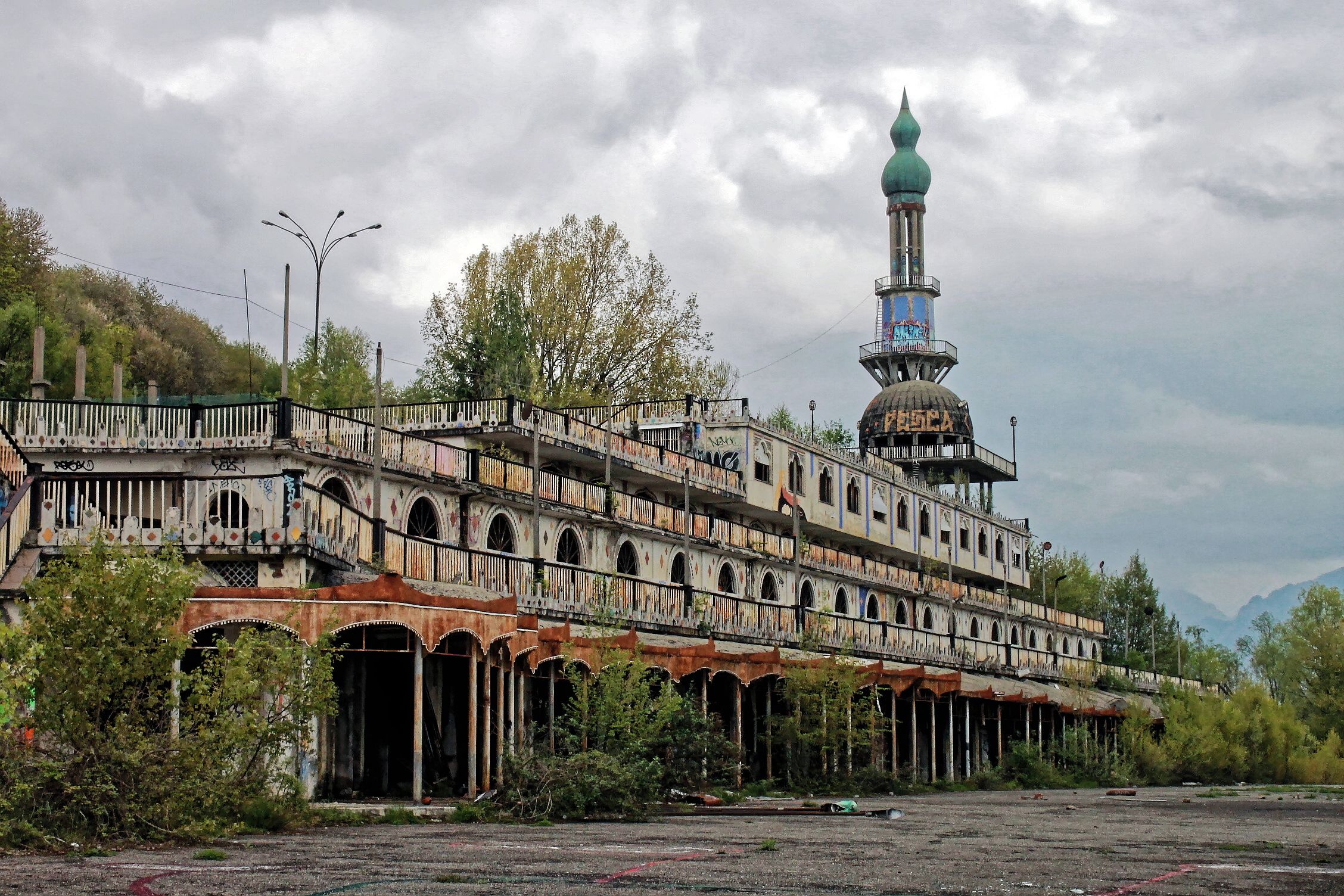
- The Minaret at Consonno

- Location within Lombardy
- Coordinates: 45°47′07″N 09°23′36″E
- Country: Italy
- Region: Lombardy
- Province: Lecco
- Municipality: Olginate

Area
  - Total: 0.30 km^{2} (0.12 sq mi)
- Elevation: 634 m (2,080 ft)
- Time zone: UTC+1 (CET)
  - Summer (DST): UTC+2 (CEST)
- Postal code: 20121–20162

Consonno is a ghost town and former village in the Olginate municipality of the province of Lecco, in Lombardy, northern Italy. The themed Città dei Balocchi ("City of Toys") resort was constructed at Consonno by entrepreneur and developer Mario Bagno in the 1960s and 1970s following the demolition of the previous village. After 1976 and 1977 landslides, Consonno became deserted.

== Geography ==
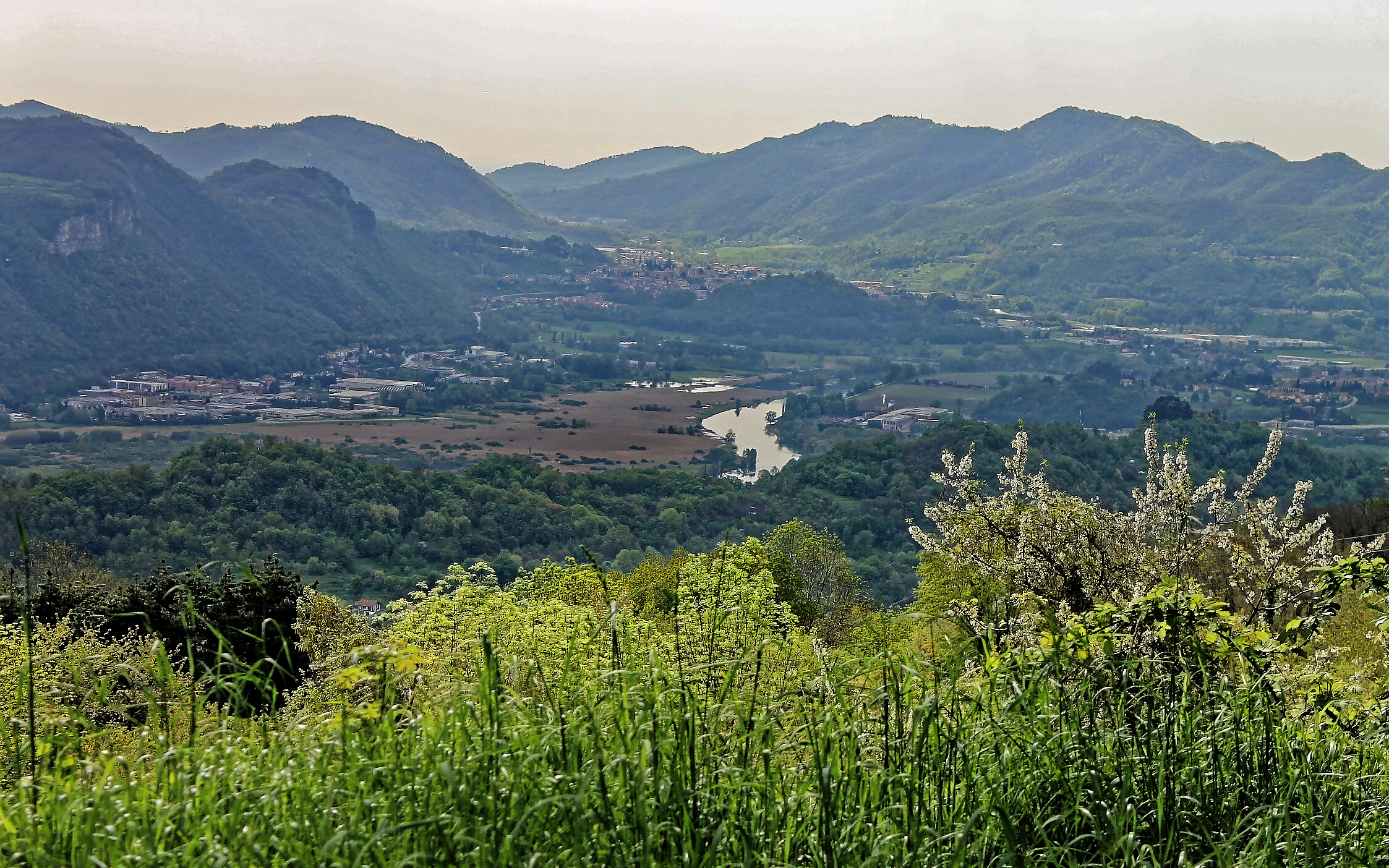
View from Consonno

Consonno is 25 miles (40 km) north-east from the centre of the Lombardy capital city of Milan, is part of the Brianza cross-province geographical, historical and cultural area, and at the southern end of the Lombard Pre-Alps. It covers an area of about 74 acres (30 ha), much of it woodland. At 2,080 feet (634 m) above sea level, Consonno is one of the highest points in the area with views of the settlements of Olginate, Valgreghentino, Garlate and Airuno, the Adda river, Monte Resegone, and the lakes Annone and Garlate. Access is by a winding through-road from the provincial (Strada provinciale), SP59 road at Olginate in the east, to the SP58 between Ravelinno and Villa Vergano in the west. The municipality area is assessed as being under hydrogeological risk from excessive rainfall, the City of Toys development itself having had an adverse effect on the natural environment and geomorphology.

== History ==
=== Political ===
Cosonno from the 10th century was part of the Lombard Leagues, which set up Medieval communes. By the 15th century it fell under the Duchy of Milan, until the duchy was defeated in 1525 by the Hapsburgs. In 1706 the Austrians took and began to control the area as Austrian-Lombardy. This lasted until between 1797 and 1802 when it became part of the Cisalpine Republic, a French Empire sister republic, then until 1805 Bonaparte's Italian Republic, finally Bonaparte's Kingdom of Italy, all three French puppet states. In 1815, Austrian rule was reinstated as the Kingdom of Lombardy–Venetia at the Congress of Vienna, which lasted until the Risorgimento and the establishment of the Kingdom of Italy in 1861.

Consonno was historically in the parish of Garlate (Pieve di Garlate) in the municipality of Monte di Brianza. The name Cosonno was attested in a document of 1085, describing an Albenga, daughter to Alberto "de loco Cussonno' (man from Cusonno), who was married to Andrea Giovanni, who owned vineyards in Vimaggiore, then under the jurisdiction of the parish of Decimo. In 1162 Consonno was a possession of the Benedictine monastery in the municipality of Civate, 4 miles (6 km) north-west from Cosonno on Lake Annone, which, under the authority of Frederick I, had an autonomy which included statutory rights over roads and watercourses within countryside near Milan, and a church at Consonno (or Sansono). By 1412, Consonno was itself a municipality, but still in the ecclesiastical parish of Garlate, which through legal representation took an oath of loyalty to Filippo Maria Visconti, 3rd duke of Milan, by which there was to be no interference or outside jurisdiction over the property of the abbey and its inhabitants. Garlate was the ecclesiastical capital of the Archdiocese of Milan, and also a civil district. The duke had acknowledged earlier tax exemptions to the "Martesana Superiore" (an area covered by today's Brianza), made in 1373 by Bernabò Visconti (Lord of Milan), and in 1385 by Gian Galeazzo Visconti, 1st duke of Milan to the places and settlements of Brianza. Consonno in 1572 was part of those lands in the Duchy of Milan which fell under the salt tax.

By 1751 Consonno, as part of Austrian Lombardy, was still in the parish of Garlate, in the province of Como, with a census finding that the settlement contained 115 taxed, and 27 non-taxed inhabitants; the tax collector was an elected official. There was no local council at Consonno, however it was in a feifdom which also included the parish of Oggiono adjacent to the west. Although being geographically within the feif, Consonno was not under its jurisdiction, but subject to the monastery and its taxes under the approval of Cardinal Mario Millini, and representation could be considered from the inhabitants of Consonno. In 1791 Consonno was included, together with the parishes of Garlate and Oggiono, and Squadra de' Mauri—a parish unit under the former duchy of Milan—in the province of Milan, but because of its geographical position was part of a district of Adda or Brivio. By 1801, under the Cisalpine Republic, Consonno made up one of the municipalities of a district of Lecco in the department of Lario, and in 1802 was relocated to an outer Milanese district, with the town of Oggiono. Consonno at the time had a population of 203. Under the Lombard-Venetian kingdom, the municipality of Consonno was included in a district of Oggiono, in the province of Como, and by 1851 had a population of 228. Following the temporary union of the Lombard provinces with the Kingdom of Sardinia, a territorial division established under a 23 October 1859 law, the municipality of Consonno with 240 inhabitants, governed by a council of fifteen members and a council of four members, was included in district V of Oggiono and district III of Lecco, in the province of Como.

An 1865 law established municipal administration under a mayor, a giunta (executive body), and a council. In 1924 Cosonno municipality was included in the district of Lecco of the province of Como. Following a reform of the municipal system in 1926, Cosonno was administered by a podestà. In 1928 Consonno was aggregated to the municipality of Olginate, and ceased as a municipal entity.

=== Community ===
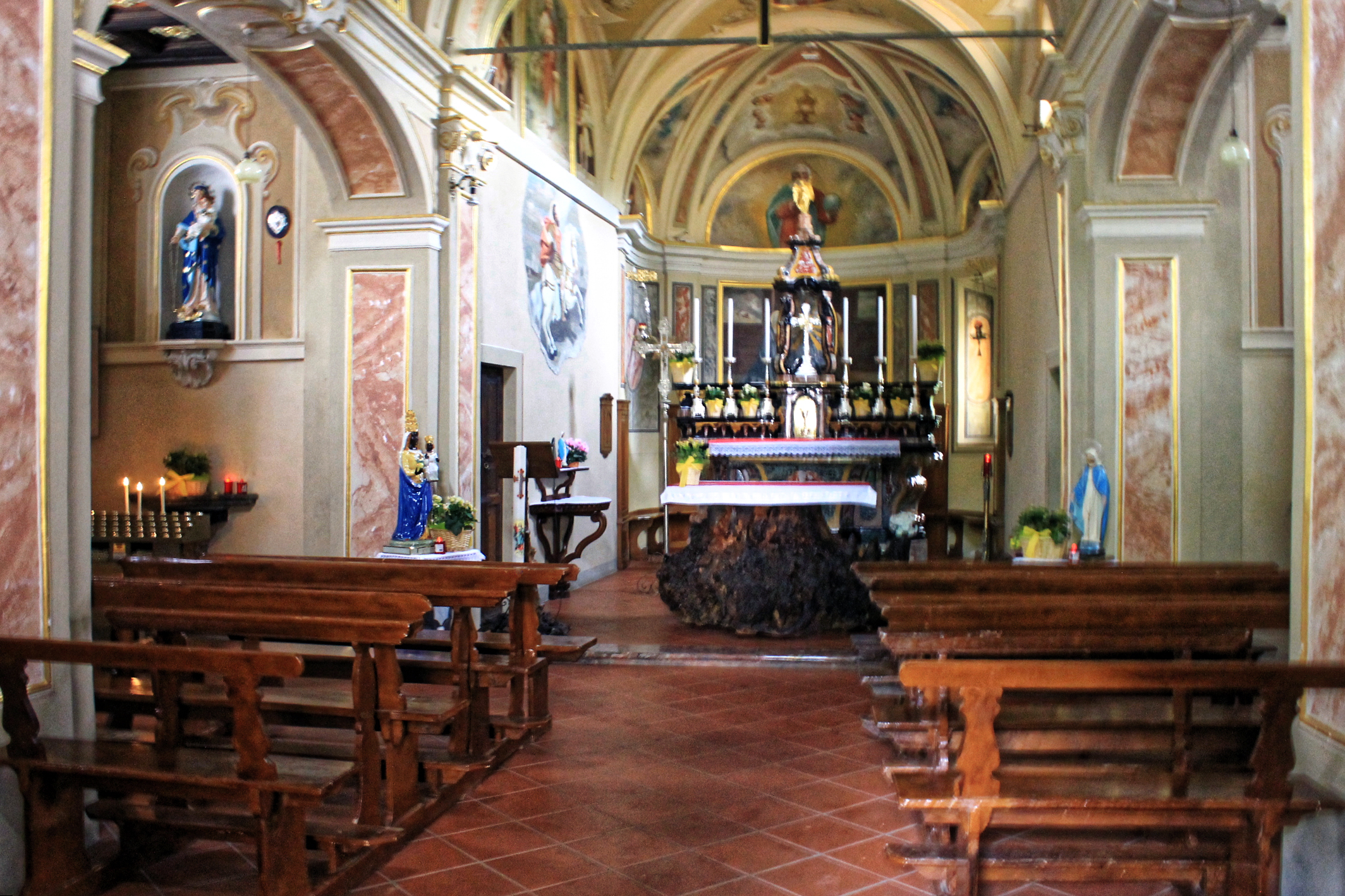
Church of San Maurizio

Consonno has been an agricultural settlement since the Middle Ages, with an historical population of between 200 and 300. Following the Risorgimento and the establishment of the Kingdom of Italy in 1861, Consonno had a population of 244; 267 in 1871; 283 in 1881; 269 in 1901; 265 in 1911; and 282 in 1921. Its economy was based on the farming and processing of chestnuts from surrounding groves, also the harvesting of celery and leek. Agricultural goods were transported to Olginate by mule track, using a transport sled, the 'ul traén.' Inhabitants neither owned their homes nor the land they cultivated. The village, and the 170 acres of land that were farmed, had been owned by the 'Immobiliare Consonno Brianza', a real estate company owned by the Brianza families of Verga and Anghieri. The company sold Consonno on 8 January 1962 to the entrepreneur Mario Bagno, following which agricultural activity ended. The village at the time of Count Bagno's appearance was an agglomeration of rural houses developed around the church dedicated to San Maurizio with adjoining two-storey chaplain's house, and surrounded by forest. The church, dated to the early Middle Ages, comprises a bell tower, central nave, an 18th-century pronaos on the facade, and an interior decorated with religious painting. The village cemetery was situated on a knoll to the north. At the centre of the village, in the town square, was a tavern, the village itself comprising small houses. One of these houses was also a shop, with a further two-storey house of eight rooms used as municipal offices. After the arrival of Count Mario Bagno the population left to find work largely in industries that had sprung up in Olginate.

== City of Toys ==
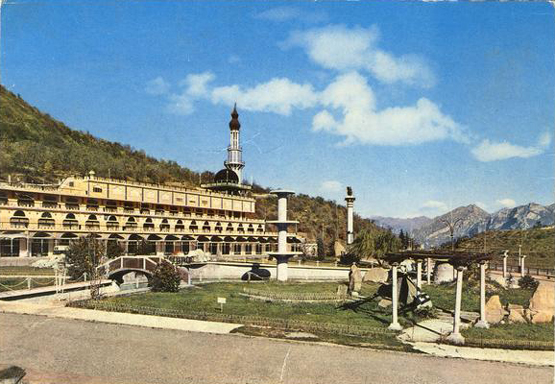
Cosonno at its height

Città dei Balocchi, translated as "City/Town of Toys", "Toy City/Town", "City of Youth", or "City of Novelties", was the brainchild of Count Mario Bagno.

Mario Bagno (born in Vercelli, 24 February 1901 – died 22 October, 1995), was a commercial entrepreneur whose company constructed buildings, neighbourhoods, roads and airport runways. He spent 22,500,000 lire (£9,900) in 1962 to appropriate and become the sole owner of the village of Consonno. The motivation for the acquisition was to exploit Consonno's panoramic position and easy access from Milan. Bagno gained authorization to build an asphalt road suitable for motor traffic to replace the ancient mule track to Olginate. He told inhabitants that he was intending to increase tourism in Brianza by building a few hotels, and would leave the old village intact. However, after bulldozers and trucks arrived, the village inhabitants were forced to abandon their homes. Five villagers, Vittorio Panzeri, Roberto Milani, Margherita Milani, Rosa Milani, and Carmen Milani stated: "The bulldozers attacked the houses with the inhabitants still inside or the animals in the stables - you had to run out quickly". Bagno razed all buildings, saving only the small church with the adjoining chaplain's house and the nearby cemetery. He used explosives to level mountainous reliefs to improve the panorama experienced from Consonno. In place of the small village, an ever-expanding complex quickly arose. On the road leading from Olginate, Bagno added arched structures over the road with banners proclaiming, variously: "In Consonno the sky is bluer", "In Consonno it's always a party", and "Consonno is the smallest but most beautiful town in the world"; these still stand today. He intended an "imposing medieval castle" gatehouse entrance, which today no longer exists, replaced by an unfinished concrete structure.

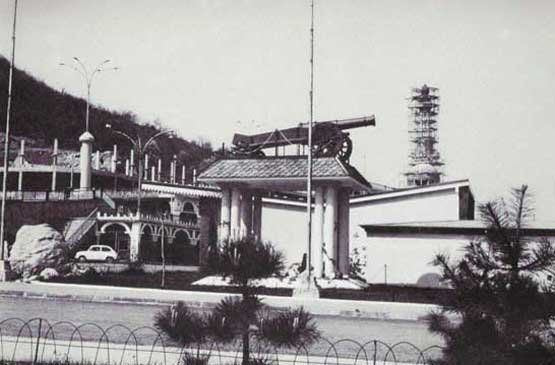
Missile Bagno pagoda

Bagno's intention is reported as wanting to transform Consonno into a "Las Vegas of Brianza", which reached its peak between the late 1960s and early 1970s, when thousands of tourists visited, and presenters such as Pippo Baudo and musicians such as Dik Dik, Mina, Milva, and Adriano Celentano performed, while the complex was favoured by newly married couples. He constructed restaurants, a dance hall (La balera), a luxury hotel, a pagoda topped by a cannon (Missile Bagno), a railway to tour the resort complex (Il Trenino Panoramico), a medieval castle entrance gateway, and the Minaret building (Il Minareto). He planned farther expansion with basketball courts, tennis courts, football pitches, miniature golf, a zoo, and a motor racing circuit. However, the novelty of the City of Toys declined, exacerbated by protests and complaints over what was seen as environmental damage including the consequent ruination of the natural landscape, and the destruction of architectural heritage which was replaced by construction out of character with the landscape.

In 1976 and 1977 heavy rains caused landslides, compounded by the damage to the landscape, which blocked the access road to Consonno. Bagno's attempts to clear the debris proved largely fruitless, and the City of Toys went into terminal decline. However, in 1980 he introduced a plan to convert the project's Gran Hotel Plaza to a retirement home for the elderly, to be managed by the friar Brother Alberto Bosisio, while in 1981 attempted to repair and restore the access road. The home failed following the death of Bagno, and the building fell into disrepair, and was finally closed in 2007, with the whole complex fenced off. The same year a rave party vandalism caused further damage and graffiti defacement to the site.

A Local Government Plan (Piano di Governo del Territorio), approved by Olginate Town Council in April 2008, outlined a recovery program for remedying hydrogeological and environmental instability, and a redevelopment for Consonno, which was still privately owned by the sons of Mario Bagno, but at the time no concrete proposals were presented. In October 2010, the access road was resurfaced, but with no maintenance or demolition carried out. There were unsuccessful attempts by the heirs of Mario Bagno to sell the Consonno complex in 2014 and 2015, with a prospectus that stipulated building hotels, shopping centres, residential facilities including high-end villas, a retirement rest home, cinema, tourist village, shops, and a university centre with student accommodation, under an estimated cost of €12,000,000.

As of 2021, the remaining buildings are unsafe and fenced-off, while access to the neglected site is not recommended for safety concerns. Any access to Consonno is limited to foot traffic, while motor vehicles are prevented by road blocks at either end of the through road, except between October after the La Burollata (chestnut festival), until Easter every Sunday from 10am to 12pm, and the rest of the year every Sunday from 10am to 7pm. Friends of Consonno (Associazione Amici di Consonno), founded in 2007 to Barbara Fumagalli, managed from May 2012 a former restaurant which they converted to a bar with period furniture, which was on loan from heirs of Mario Bagno. The Friends organize Consonno events such as on Easter Monday the Pasquetta a Consonno, Burollata (chestnut festival), recreational activities, a market, and on 22 September Sagra di San Maurizio (Festival of Saint Maurice), this on the saint's the feast day during which a mass is celebrated in the church of San Maurizio after which the saint's statue displayed in the square in front of the Minaret is carried in procession through the streets of the village.
