= Lago di Tovel =

Lake in Trentino, Italy

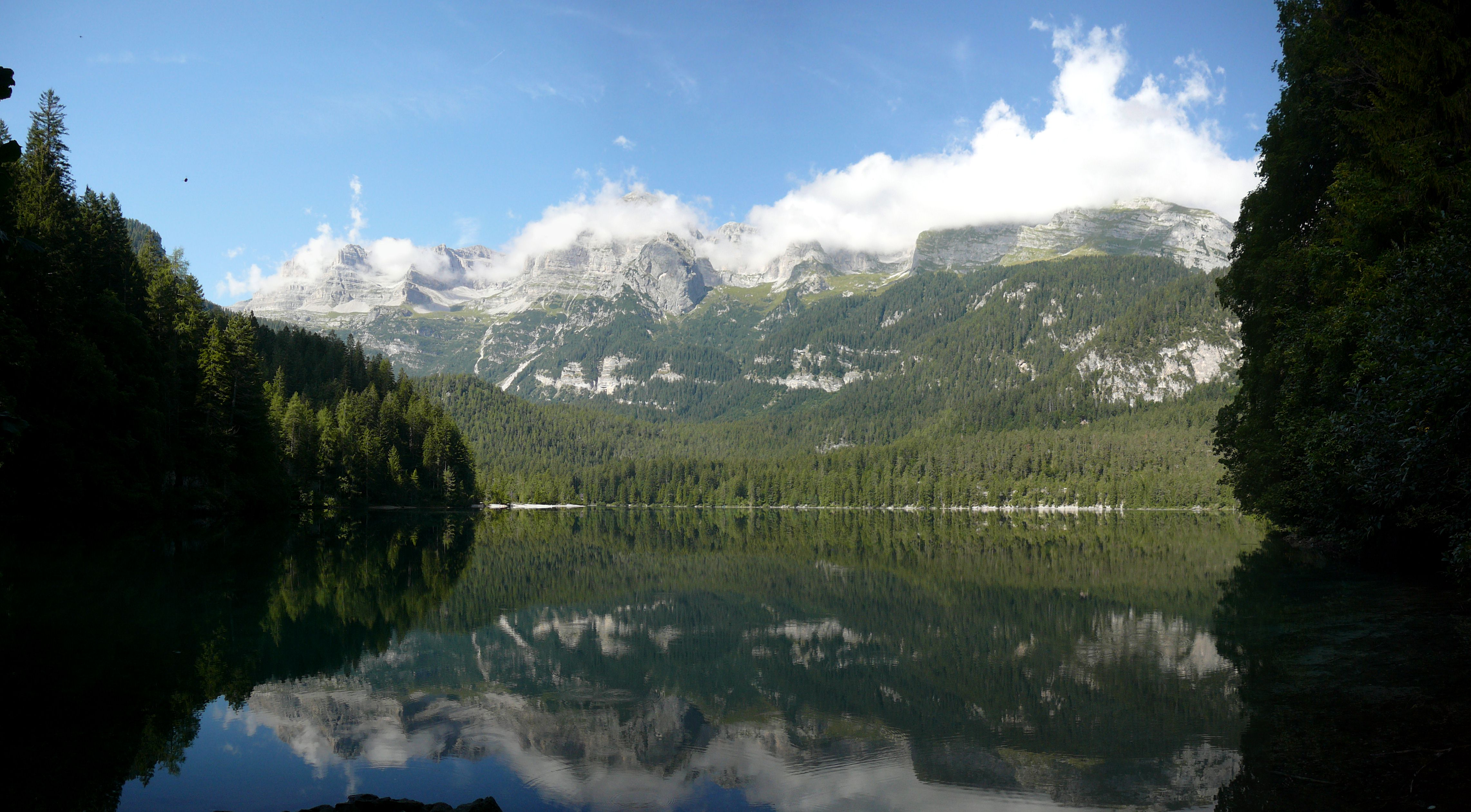

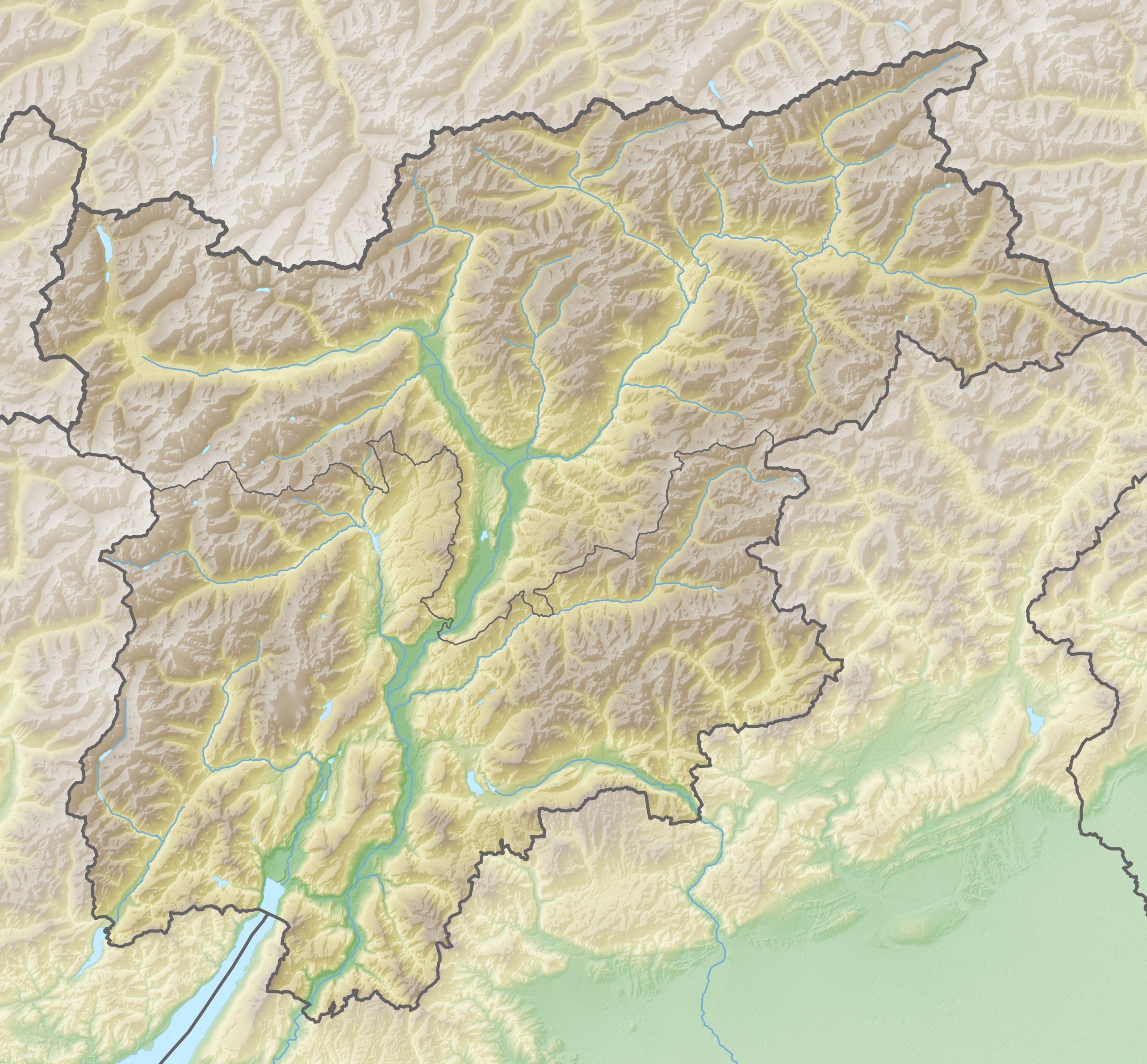
- Location within Trentino-Alto Adige/Südtirol
- Location: Trentino
- Coordinates: 46°15′41.58″N 10°56′52.79″E
- Primary inflows: Rislà, S. Maria Flavona
- Primary outflows: Torrente Tresenga
- Basin countries: Italy
- Surface area: 0.38 km^{2} (0.15 sq mi)
- Surface elevation: 1,178 m (3,865 ft)

Ramsar Wetland
- Designated: 19 September 1980
- Reference no.: 210

Lago di Tovel is a lake in Trentino, Italy. At an elevation of 1178 m, its surface area is 0.38 km^{2}. The lake has been recognised as a wetland of international importance under the Ramsar Convention in 1980.
