= Malé, Italy =

Italian comune

Malé
- Comune
- Comune di Malé
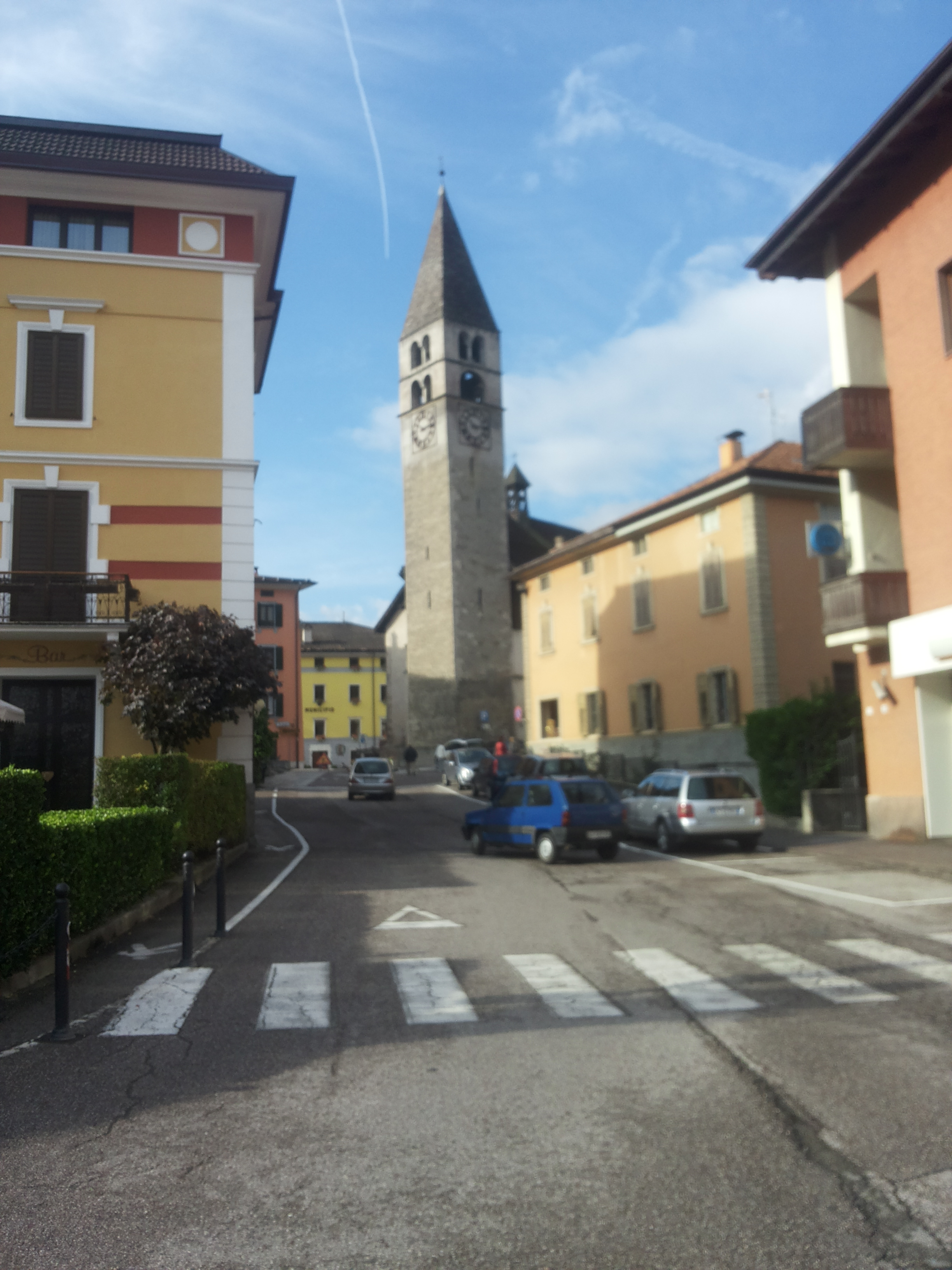

- Location within Italy Location within Trentino-Alto Adige/Südtirol
- Coordinates: 46°21′N 10°54′E
- Country: Italy
- Region: Trentino-Alto Adige/Südtirol
- Province: Trentino (TN)
- Frazioni: Magras, Arnago, Bolentina, Montes, Pondasio, Molini

Government
  - Mayor: Barbara Cunaccia (Civic List)

Area
  - Total: 26.53 km^{2} (10.24 sq mi)
- Elevation: 737 m (2,418 ft)

Population (2026)
  - Total: 2,296
  - Density: 86.54/km^{2} (224.1/sq mi)
- Demonym: Maletani or Maledi
- Time zone: UTC+1 (CET)
  - Summer (DST): UTC+2 (CEST)
- Postal code: 38027
- Dialing code: 0463
- Website: Official website

Malé (Italian pronunciation: [maˈle]) is a comune (municipality) in Trentino in the northern Italian region Trentino-Alto Adige/Südtirol, located about 35 kilometres (22 mi) northwest of the provincial capital Trento. As of 10 October 2023, it had a population of 2,239 and an area of 26.53 square kilometres (10.24 mi^{2}).

The municipality of Malé contains the frazioni (subdivisions, mainly villages and hamlets) Magras, Arnago, Bolentina, Montes, Pondasio and Molini.

Malé borders the following municipalities: Rabbi, Terzolas, Croviana and Dimaro Folgarida.

The economy of Malé is based mainly on tourism, handcraft (typically wooden products), and farming (typically producing apples, cheese and cooked meats). The Trento-Malè-Marilleva railway connects the comune to Trento.

Near Malè is the Stelvio National Park, one of the biggest natural National Parks in Italy, and the Brenta group a UNESCO World Heritage Site.

From 15 to 22 June 2008 Malè was the venue of the mountain bike trials competitions of the UCI Mountain Bike & Trials World Championships "Val di Sole 2008". The sections were set up (for the first time in history) in the town squares.

== Demographic evolution ==
Historical population

Year	Pop.	±%
1861	?	—
1871	?	—
1881	?	—
1901	?	—
1911	?	—

Year	Pop.	±%
1921	2,185	—
1931	2,084	−4.6%
1936	2,030	−2.6%
1951	2,142	+5.5%
1961	2,100	−2.0%

Year	Pop.	±%
1971	2,113	+0.6%
1981	2,027	−4.1%
1991	2,049	+1.1%
2001	2,138	+4.3%

Source: Data from ISTAT
