= Chronological summary of the 2022 Winter Paralympics =

This is a chronological summary of the major events of the 2022 Winter Paralympics held in Beijing, China.

== Calendar ==
In the following calendar for the 2022 Winter Paralympics, each blue box represents an event competition. The yellow boxes represent days during which medal-awarding finals for a sport were held. The number in each yellow box represents the number of finals that were contested on that day. Some events, such as the men's and women's banked slalom snowboarding finals, were moved as a result of warm weather conditions.

All times and dates use China Standard Time (UTC+8)

| OC | Opening ceremony | ● | Event competitions | 1 | Gold medal events | CC | Closing ceremony |

| March 2022 | March | | | | | | | | | | Events |
| March 2022 | 4th Fri | 5th Sat | 6th Sun | 7th Mon | 8th Tue | 9th Wed | 10th Thu | 11th Fri | 12th Sat | 13th Sun | Events |
|---|---|---|---|---|---|---|---|---|---|---|---|
| Ceremonies | OC | | | | | | | | | CC | — |
| Alpine skiing | | 6 | 6 | 6 | | | 3 | 3 | 3 | 3 | 30 |
| Biathlon | | 6 | | | 6 | | | 6 | | | 18 |
| Cross-country skiing | | | 2 | 4 | | 6 | | | 6 | 2 | 20 |
| Para ice hockey | | ● | ● | | ● | ● | | ● | ● | 1 | 1 |
| Snowboarding | | | ● | 4 | | | | 4 | | | 8 |
| Wheelchair curling | | ● | ● | ● | ● | ● | ● | ● | 1 | | 1 |
| Daily medal events | | 12 | 8 | 14 | 6 | 6 | 3 | 13 | 10 | 6 | 78 |
| Cumulative total | | 12 | 20 | 34 | 40 | 46 | 49 | 62 | 72 | 78 | 78 |
| March 2022 | 4th Fri | 5th Sat | 6th Sun | 7th Mon | 8th Tue | 9th Wed | 10th Thu | 11th Fri | 12th Sat | 13th Sun | Total events |
| March 2022 | March | | | | | | | | | | Total events |

== Medal table ==
* Host nation (Host nation)

2022 Winter Paralympics medal table
| Rank | NPC | Gold | Silver | Bronze | Total |
|---|---|---|---|---|---|
| 1 | China* | 18 | 20 | 23 | 61 |
| 2 | Ukraine | 11 | 10 | 8 | 29 |
| 3 | Canada | 8 | 6 | 11 | 25 |
| 4 | France | 7 | 3 | 2 | 12 |
| 5 | United States | 6 | 11 | 3 | 20 |
| 6 | Austria | 5 | 5 | 3 | 13 |
| 7 | Germany | 4 | 8 | 7 | 19 |
| 8 | Norway | 4 | 2 | 1 | 7 |
| 9 | Japan | 4 | 1 | 2 | 7 |
| 10 | Slovakia | 3 | 0 | 3 | 6 |
| 11–19 | Remaining | 8 | 12 | 15 | 35 |
| Totals (19 entries) | | 78 | 78 | 78 | 234 |

== Day-by-day summaries ==
=== Day 0 — Friday 4 March ===
- The opening ceremony was held at Beijing National Stadium at 20:00 China Standard Time (UTC+8).

=== Day 1 — Saturday 5 March ===
Alpine skiing

| Event | Class | Gold | | Silver | | Bronze | |
|---|---|---|---|---|---|---|---|
| Women's downhill | Visually impaired | Henrieta Farkašová; Guide: Martin Motyka; Slovakia | 1:19.50 | Zhu Daqing; Guide: Yan Hanhan; China | 1:21.75 | Millie Knight; Guide: Brett Wild; Great Britain | 1:23.20 |
| Women's downhill | Sitting | Momoka Muraoka; Japan | 1:29.77 | Anna-Lena Forster; Germany | 1:30.59 | Liu Sitong; China | 1:32.10 |
| Women's downhill | Standing | Mollie Jepsen; Canada | 1:21.75 | Zhang Mengqiu; China | 1:21.85 | Ebba Årsjö; Sweden | 1:23.20 |
| Men's downhill | Visually impaired | Johannes Aigner; Guide: Matteo Fleischmann; Austria | 1:13.45 | Mac Marcoux; Guide: Jack Leitch; Canada | 1:13.81 | Hyacinthe Deleplace; Guide: Valentin Giraud Moine; France | 1:14.10 |
| Men's downhill | Sitting | Corey Peters; New Zealand | 1:16.73 | Jesper Pedersen; Norway | 1:17.99 | Taiki Morii; Japan | 1:18.29 |
| Men's downhill | Standing | Arthur Bauchet; France | 1:14.92 | Markus Salcher; Austria | 1:15.25 | Théo Gmür; Switzerland | 1:16.17 |

Biathlon

| Event | Class | Gold | | Silver | | Bronze | |
|---|---|---|---|---|---|---|---|
| Women's 6 kilometres | Visually impaired | Oksana Shyshkova; Guide: Vitaliy Kazakov; Ukraine | 20:09.0 | Linn Kazmaier; Guide: Florian Baumann; Germany | 20:14.6 | Leonie Maria Walter; Guide: Pirmin Strecker; Germany | 20:39.0 |
| Women's 6 kilometres | Sitting | Oksana Masters; United States | 20:51.2 | Shan Yilin; China | 21:06.3 | Kendall Gretsch; United States | 21:52.9 |
| Women's 6 kilometres | Standing | Guo Yujie; China | 19:43.3 | Liudmyla Liashenko; Ukraine | 19:51.7 | Zhao Zhiqing; China | 20:05.1 |
| Men's 6 kilometres | Visually impaired | Vitaliy Lukyanenko; Guide: Borys Babar; Ukraine | 17:05.8 | Oleksandr Kazik; Guide: Serhii Kucheriavyi; Ukraine | 17:31.9 | Dmytro Suiarko; Guide: Oleksandr Nikonovych; Ukraine | 17:33.3 |
| Men's 6 kilometres | Sitting | Liu Zixu; China | 18:51.5 | Taras Rad; Ukraine | 19:09.0 | Liu Mengtao; China | 19:32.3 |
| Men's 6 kilometres | Standing | Grygorii Vovchynskyi; Ukraine | 16:17.6 | Marco Maier; Germany | 17:03.4 | Mark Arendz; Canada | 17:13.6 |

Para ice hockey

- United States won 5–0 against Canada in a preliminary round match.
- Czech Republic won 5–0 against Italy in a preliminary round match.
- China won 7–0 against Slovakia in a preliminary round match.

Wheelchair curling

- Draw 1 and Draw 2 were held.

=== Day 2 — Sunday 6 March ===
Alpine skiing

| Event | Class | Gold | | Silver | | Bronze | |
|---|---|---|---|---|---|---|---|
| Women's Super-G | Visually impaired | Alexandra Rexová; Guide: Eva Trajčíková; Slovakia | 1:17.01 | Menna Fitzpatrick; Guide: Gary Smith; Great Britain | 1:18.79 | Zhu Daqing; Guide: Yan Hanhan; China | 1:19.30 |
| Women's Super-G | Sitting | Momoka Muraoka; Japan | 1:23.73 | Anna-Lena Forster; Germany | 1:23.84 | Zhang Wenjing; China | 1:24.31 |
| Women's Super-G | Standing | Zhang Mengqiu; China | 1:13.54 | Marie Bochet; France | 1:14.97 | Alana Ramsay; Canada | 1:16.84 |
| Men's Super-G | Visually impaired | Neil Simpson; Guide: Andrew Simpson; Great Britain | 1:08.91 | Giacomo Bertagnolli; Guide: Andrea Ravelli; Italy | 1:09.31 | Johannes Aigner; Guide: Matteo Fleischmann; Austria | 1:09.74 |
| Men's Super-G | Sitting | Jesper Pedersen; Norway | 1:09.69 | Corey Peters; New Zealand | 1:10.16 | Taiki Morii; Japan | 1:10.61 |
| Men's Super-G | Standing | Liang Jingyi; China | 1:09.11 | Markus Salcher; Austria | 1:09.35 | Alexis Guimond; Canada | 1:10.02 |

Cross-country skiing

| Event | Class | Gold | | Silver | | Bronze | |
|---|---|---|---|---|---|---|---|
| Women's 15 kilometres | Sitting | Yang Hongqiong; China | 43:06.7 | Oksana Masters; United States | 43:38.8 | Li Panpan; China | 45:17.0 |
| Men's 18 kilometres | Sitting | Zheng Peng; China | 43:09.2 | Mao Zhongwu; China | 43:23.8 | Collin Cameron; Canada | 47:36.6 |

Para ice hockey

- United States won 9–1 against South Korea in a preliminary round match.
- Italy won 2–1 against Slovakia in a preliminary round match.
- China won 5–1 against Czech Republic in a preliminary round match.

Snowboarding

- The qualification rounds of the women's snowboard cross and men's snowboard cross events were held.

Wheelchair curling

- Draw 3, Draw 4 and Draw 5 were held.

=== Day 3 — Monday 7 March ===
Alpine skiing

| Event | Class | Gold | | Silver | | Bronze | |
|---|---|---|---|---|---|---|---|
| Women's super combined | Visually impaired | Henrieta Farkašová; Guide: Michal Červeň; Slovakia | 2:03.39 | Zhu Daqing; Guide: Yan Hanhan; China | 2:04.25 | Menna Fitzpatrick; Guide: Gary Smith; Great Britain | 2:05.98 |
| Women's super combined | Sitting | Anna-Lena Forster; Germany | 2:11.37 | Momoka Muraoka; Japan | 2:12.14 | Liu Sitong; China | 2:15.84 |
| Women's super combined | Standing | Ebba Årsjö; Sweden | 1:56.51 | Zhang Mengqiu; China | 1:58.02 | Alana Ramsay; Canada | 2:06.33 |
| Men's super combined | Visually impaired | Giacomo Bertagnolli; Guide: Andrea Ravelli; Italy | 1:49.80 | Johannes Aigner; Guide: Matteo Fleischmann; Austria | 1:51.98 | Neil Simpson; Guide: Andrew Simpson; Great Britain | 1:52.81 |
| Men's super combined | Sitting | Jesper Pedersen; Norway | 1:50.23 | Jeroen Kampschreur; Netherlands | 1:50.51 | Niels de Langen; Netherlands | 1:53.40 |
| Men's super combined | Standing | Arthur Bauchet; France | 1:50.26 | Santeri Kiiveri; Finland | 1:54.48 | Adam Hall; New Zealand | 1:54.77 |

Cross-country skiing

| Event | Class | Gold | | Silver | | Bronze | |
|---|---|---|---|---|---|---|---|
| Women's 15 kilometres freestyle | Visually impaired | Oksana Shyshkova; Guide: Andriy Marchenko; Ukraine | 51:09.1 | Linn Kazmaier; Guide: Florian Baumann; Germany | 52:05.6 | Leonie Maria Walter; Guide: Pirmin Strecker; Germany | 54:08.8 |
| Women's 15 kilometres freestyle | Standing | Natalie Wilkie; Canada | 48:04.8 | Sydney Peterson; United States | 49:00.2 | Brittany Hudak; Canada | 49:27.8 |
| Men's 20 kilometres classical | Visually impaired | Brian McKeever; Guide: Russell Kennedy; Canada | 55:36.7 | Jake Adicoff; Guide: Sam Wood; United States | 58:54.4 | Zebastian Modin; Guide: Emil Jönsson; Sweden | 1:00:05.4 |
| Men's 20 kilometres classical | Standing | Taiki Kawayoke; Japan | 52:52.8 | Cai Jiayun; China | 54:27.7 | Qiu Mingyang; China | 54:29.7 |

Snowboarding

| Event | Class | Gold | Silver | Bronze |
|---|---|---|---|---|
| Women's snowboard cross | SB-LL2 | Cécile Hernandez; France | Lisa DeJong; Canada | Brenna Huckaby; United States |
| Men's snowboard cross | SB-LL1 | Tyler Turner; Canada | Mike Schultz; United States | Wu Zhongwei; China |
| Men's snowboard cross | SB-LL2 | Matti Suur-Hamari; Finland | Garrett Geros; United States | Ben Tudhope; Australia |
| Men's snowboard cross | SB-UL | Ji Lijia; China | Wang Pengyao; China | Zhu Yonggang; China |

Wheelchair curling

- Draw 6, Draw 7 and Draw 8 were held.

=== Day 4 — Tuesday 8 March ===
Biathlon

| Event | Class | Gold | | Silver | | Bronze | |
|---|---|---|---|---|---|---|---|
| Women's 10 kilometres | Visually impaired | Leonie Maria Walter; Guide: Pirmin Strecker; Germany | 40:56.2 | Oksana Shyshkova; Guide: Vitaliy Kazakov; Ukraine | 40:59.9 | Wang Yue; Guide: Li Yalin; China | 42:50.3 |
| Women's 10 kilometres | Sitting | Kendall Gretsch; United States | 33:12.3 | Oksana Masters; United States | 33:21.0 | Anja Wicker; Germany | 35:45.3 |
| Women's 10 kilometres | Standing | Iryna Bui; Ukraine | 36:43.1 | Oleksandra Kononova; Ukraine | 36:55.9 | Liudmyla Liashenko; Ukraine | 36:56.9 |
| Men's 10 kilometres | Visually impaired | Vitaliy Lukyanenko; Guide: Borys Babar; Ukraine | 34:12.7 | Anatolii Kovalevskyi; Guide: Oleksandr Mukshyn; Ukraine | 34:57.3 | Dmytro Suiarko; Guide: Oleksandr Nikonovych; Ukraine | 35:30.9 |
| Men's 10 kilometres | Sitting | Liu Mengtao; China | 30:37.7 | Martin Fleig; Germany | 31:23.7 | Taras Rad; Ukraine | 31:26.9 |
| Men's 10 kilometres | Standing | Mark Arendz; Canada | 31:45.2 | Grygorii Vovchynskyi; Ukraine | 32:18.0 | Alexandr Gerlits; Kazakhstan | 33:06.5 |

Para ice hockey

- Canada won 6–0 against South Korea in a preliminary round match.
- China won 6–0 against Italy in a preliminary round match.
- Czech Republic won 3–0 against Slovakia in a preliminary round match.

Wheelchair curling

- Draw 9, Draw 10 and Draw 11 were held.

=== Day 5 — Wednesday 9 March ===
Cross-country skiing

| Event | Class | Gold | | Silver | | Bronze | |
|---|---|---|---|---|---|---|---|
| Women's sprint | Visually impaired | Carina Edlinger; Guide: Josef Lorenz; Austria | 3:49.6 | Oksana Shyshkova; Guide: Andriy Marchenko; Ukraine | 3:56.4 | Linn Kazmaier; Guide: Florian Baumann; Germany | 4:05.2 |
| Women's sprint | Sitting | Yang Hongqiong; China | 3:18.2 | Oksana Masters; United States | 3:19.9 | Li Panpan; China | 3:31.0 |
| Women's sprint | Standing | Natalie Wilkie; Canada | 4:05.1 | Vilde Nilsen; Norway | 4:08.1 | Sydney Peterson; United States | 4:12.1 |
| Men's sprint | Visually impaired | Brian McKeever; Guide: Russell Kennedy; Canada | 3:19.5 | Jake Adicoff; Guide: Sam Wood; United States | 3:20.3 | Zebastian Modin; Guide: Emil Jönsson; Sweden | 3:37.8 |
| Men's sprint | Sitting | Zheng Peng; China | 2:42.4 | Mao Zhongwu; China | 2:44.9 | Collin Cameron; Canada | 2:46.3 |
| Men's sprint | Standing | Benjamin Daviet; France | 3:07.5 | Marco Maier; Germany | 3:08.8 | Grygorii Vovchynskyi; Ukraine | 3:09.3 |

Para ice hockey

- South Korea won 4–0 against Italy in a quarterfinal match.
- China won 4–3 against Czech Republic in a quarterfinal match.

Wheelchair curling

- Draw 12, Draw 13 and Draw 14 were held.

=== Day 6 — Thursday 10 March ===
Alpine skiing

| Event | Class | Gold | | Silver | | Bronze | |
|---|---|---|---|---|---|---|---|
| Men's giant slalom | Visually impaired | Johannes Aigner; Guide: Matteo Fleischmann; Austria | 1:49.34 | Giacomo Bertagnolli; Guide: Andrea Ravelli; Italy | 1:51.02 | Miroslav Haraus; Guide: Maroš Hudík; Slovakia | 1:54.92 |
| Men's giant slalom | Sitting | Jesper Pedersen; Norway | 1:54.20 | René De Silvestro; Italy | 1:57.50 | Liang Zilu; China | 2:00.92 |
| Men's giant slalom | Standing | Santeri Kiiveri; Finland | 1:55.40 | Thomas Walsh; United States | 1:55.44 | Arthur Bauchet; France | 1:55.89 |

Wheelchair curling

- Draw 15, Draw 16 and Draw 17 were held.

=== Day 7 — Friday 11 March ===
Alpine skiing

| Event | Class | Gold | | Silver | | Bronze | |
|---|---|---|---|---|---|---|---|
| Women's giant slalom | Visually impaired | Veronika Aigner; Guide: Elisabeth Aigner; Austria | 1:52.54 | Zhu Daqing; Guide: Yan Hanhan; China | 1:59.85 | Barbara Aigner; Guide: Klara Sykora; Austria | 1:59.93 |
| Women's giant slalom | Sitting | Momoka Muraoka; Japan | 2:02.27 | Liu Sitong; China | 2:09.55 | Zhang Wenjing; China | 2:09.55 |
| Women's giant slalom | Standing | Zhang Mengqiu; China | 1:55.12 | Mollie Jepsen; Canada | 2:00.95 | Andrea Rothfuss; Germany | 2:01.91 |

Biathlon

| Event | Class | Gold | | Silver | | Bronze | |
|---|---|---|---|---|---|---|---|
| Women's 12.5 kilometres | Visually impaired | Oksana Shyshkova; Guide: Vitaliy Kazakov; Ukraine | 50:19.6 | Linn Kazmaier; Guide: Florian Baumann; Germany | 50:23.2 | Leonie Maria Walter; Guide: Pirmin Strecker; Germany | 52:27.6 |
| Women's 12.5 kilometres | Sitting | Oksana Masters; United States | 41:17.9 | Kendall Gretsch; United States | 42:23.7 | Shan Yilin; China | 42:36.6 |
| Women's 12.5 kilometres | Standing | Liudmyla Liashenko; Ukraine | 47:22.0 | Zhao Zhiqing; China | 48:06.3 | Brittany Hudak; Canada | 49:03.4 |
| Men's 12.5 kilometres | Visually impaired | Oleksandr Kazik; Guide: Serhii Kucheriavyi; Ukraine | 43:16.1 | Vitaliy Lukyanenko; Guide: Borys Babar; Ukraine | 44:44.3 | Yu Shuang; Guide: Wang Guanyu; China | 46:35.3 |
| Men's 12.5 kilometres | Sitting | Liu Mengtao; China | 38:29.4 | Taras Rad; Ukraine | 39:13.9 | Liu Zixu; China | 39:27.5 |
| Men's 12.5 kilometres | Standing | Benjamin Daviet; France | 37:58.9 | Mark Arendz; Canada | 40:13.0 | Grygorii Vovchynskyi; Ukraine | 40:13.0 |

Para ice hockey

- Canada won 11–0 against South Korea in a semifinal match.
- United States won 11–0 against China in a semifinal match.

Snowboarding

| Event | Class | Gold | | Silver | | Bronze | |
|---|---|---|---|---|---|---|---|
| Women's banked slalom | SB-LL2 | Brenna Huckaby; United States | 1:17.28 | Geng Yanhong; China | 1:17.38 | Li Tiantian; China | 1:17.46 |
| Men's banked slalom | SB-LL1 | Wu Zhongwei; China | 1:10.85 | Chris Vos; Netherlands | 1:12.06 | Tyler Turner; Canada | 1:12.84 |
| Men's banked slalom | SB-LL2 | Sun Qi; China | 1:09.73 | Matti Suur-Hamari; Finland | 1:09.98 | Ollie Hill; Great Britain | 1:10.45 |
| Men's banked slalom | SB-UL | Maxime Montaggioni; France | 1:09.41 | Ji Lijia; China | 1:09.86 | Zhu Yonggang; China | 1:10.14 |

Wheelchair curling

- China won against Canada in a semifinal match.
- Sweden won against Slovakia in a semifinal match.
- Canada won against Slovakia in the bronze medal match.

=== Day 8 — Saturday 12 March ===
Alpine skiing

| Event | Class | Gold | | Silver | | Bronze | |
|---|---|---|---|---|---|---|---|
| Women's slalom | Visually impaired | Veronika Aigner; Guide: Elisabeth Aigner; Austria | 1:31.53 | Barbara Aigner; Guide: Klara Sykora; Austria | 1:33.24 | Alexandra Rexová; Guide: Eva Trajčíková; Slovakia | 1:36.31 |
| Women's slalom | Sitting | Anna-Lena Forster; Germany | 1:37.86 | Zhang Wenjing; China | 1:40.18 | Liu Sitong; China | 2:15.84 |

Cross-country skiing

| Event | Class | Gold | | Silver | | Bronze | |
|---|---|---|---|---|---|---|---|
| Women's 10 kilometres | Visually impaired | Linn Kazmaier; Guide: Florian Baumann; Germany | 41:40.8 | Wang Yue; Guide: Li Yalin; China | 42:20.3 | Carina Edlinger; Guide: Josef Lorenz; Austria | 43:13.9 |
| Women's 10 kilometres | Standing | Oleksandra Kononova; Ukraine | 41:18.0 | Natalie Wilkie; Canada | 41:45.3 | Iryna Bui; Ukraine | 41:47.1 |
| Men's 12.5 kilometres | Visually impaired | Brian McKeever; Guide: Russell Kennedy; Canada | 33:06.6 | Zebastian Modin; Guide: Emil Jönsson; Sweden | 33:59.1 | Dmytro Suiarko; Guide: Oleksandr Nikonovych; Ukraine | 34:08.1 |
| Men's 12.5 kilometres | Standing | Wang Chenyang; China | 33:07.8 | Benjamin Daviet; France | 33:09.1 | Cai Jiayun; China | 33:18.0 |

Para ice hockey

- China won 4–0 against South Korea in the bronze medal match.

Wheelchair curling

- China won against Sweden in the gold medal match.

=== Day 9 — Sunday 13 March ===
Alpine skiing

| Event | Class | Gold | | Silver | | Bronze | |
|---|---|---|---|---|---|---|---|
| Men's slalom | Visually impaired | Giacomo Bertagnolli; Guide: Andrea Ravelli; Italy | 1:26.82 | Johannes Aigner; Guide: Matteo Fleischmann; Austria | 1:27.10 | Miroslav Haraus; Guide: Maroš Hudík; Slovakia | 1:36.22 |
| Men's slalom | Sitting | Jesper Pedersen; Norway | 1:31.10 | Niels de Langen; Netherlands | 1:37.18 | René De Silvestro; Italy | 1:38.44 |
| Men's slalom | Standing | Arthur Bauchet; France | 1:29.61 | Liang Jingyi; China | 1:32.27 | Adam Hall; New Zealand | 1:33.21 |

Cross-country skiing

| Event | Gold | | Silver | | Bronze | |
|---|---|---|---|---|---|---|
| 4 × 2.5 km Mixed Relay | United States (USA); Oksana Masters; Sydney Peterson; Daniel Cnossen; Jake Adicoff; Guide: Sam Wood | 25:59.3 | China (CHN); Shan Yilin; Wang Chenyang; Zheng Peng; Cai Jiayun | 26:25.3 | Canada (CAN); Collin Cameron; Emily Young; Mark Arendz; Natalie Wilkie | 27:00.6 |
| 4 × 2.5 km Open Relay | Ukraine (UKR); Dmytro Suiarko; Guide: Oleksandr Nikonovych; Grygorii Vovchynskyi; Vasyl Kravchuk; Anatolii Kovalevskyi; Guide: Oleksandr Mukshyn | 28:05.3 | France (FRA); Benjamin Daviet; Anthony Chalençon; Guide: Alexandre Pouye; Guide: Brice Ottonello | 28:30.4 | Norway (NOR); Kjartan Haugen; Vilde Nilsen; Thomas Oxaal; Guide: Ole-Martin Lid | 28:41.0 |

Para ice hockey

- United States won 5–0 against Canada in the gold medal match.

Ceremonies

- The closing ceremony was held at Beijing National Stadium at 20:00 China Standard Time (UTC+8).
