= Alpine skiing at the 2022 Winter Paralympics – Men's super-G =

Men's super-G at the XIII Paralympic Winter Games
- Paralympic alpine skiing
- Venue: Yanqing National Alpine Skiing Centre
- Dates: 6 March 2022

Men's super-G (visually impaired) at the XIII Paralympic Winter Games
- Competitors: 10 from 7 nations

Medalists
1st place, gold medalist(s)		Neil Simpson	Great Britain
2nd place, silver medalist(s)		Giacomo Bertagnolli	Italy
3rd place, bronze medalist(s)		Johannes Aigner	Austria

Men's super-G (standing) at the XIII Paralympic Winter Games
- Competitors: 39 from 15 nations

Medalists
1st place, gold medalist(s)		Liang Jingyi	China
2nd place, silver medalist(s)		Markus Salcher	Austria
3rd place, bronze medalist(s)		Alexis Guimond	Canada

Men's super-G (sitting) at the XIII Paralympic Winter Games
- Competitors: 28 from 16 nations

Medalists
1st place, gold medalist(s)		Jesper Pedersen	Norway
2nd place, silver medalist(s)		Corey Peters	New Zealand
3rd place, bronze medalist(s)		Taiki Morii	Japan

The Men's super-G competition of the 2022 Winter Paralympics was held at the Yanqing National Alpine Skiing Centre on 6 March 2022.

== Medal table ==
Rank	Nation	Gold	Silver	Bronze	Total
1	China (CHN)*	1	0	0	1
1	Great Britain (GBR)	1	0	0	1
1	Norway (NOR)	1	0	0	1
4	Austria (AUT)	0	1	1	2
5	Italy (ITA)	0	1	0	1
5	New Zealand (NZL)	0	1	0	1
7	Canada (CAN)	0	0	1	1
7	Japan (JPN)	0	0	1	1
Totals (8 entries)		3	3	3	9

== Visually impaired ==
In the super-G visually impaired, the athlete with a visual impairment has a sighted guide. The two skiers are considered a team, and dual medals are awarded.

Rank	Bib	Name	Country	Time	Difference
1st place, gold medalist(s)	6	Neil Simpson; Guide: Andrew Simpson	Great Britain	1:08.91	–
2nd place, silver medalist(s)	5	Giacomo Bertagnolli; Guide: Andrea Ravelli	Italy	1:09.31	+0.40
3rd place, bronze medalist(s)	1	Johannes Aigner; Guide: Matteo Fleischmann	Austria	1:09.74	+0.83
4	2	Hyacinthe Deleplace; Guide: Valentin Giraud Moine	France	1:09.78	+0.87
5	3	Miroslav Haraus; Guide: Maros Hudik	Slovakia	1:10.29	+1.38
6	8	Patrick Jensen; Guide: Amelia Hodgson	Australia	1:16.25	+7.34
7	10	Logan Leach; Guide: Julien Petit	Canada	1:18.38	+9.47
	7	Mac Marcoux; Guide: Tristan Rodgers	Canada	DNF	—N/a
	9	Marek Kubačka; Guide: Maria Zatovicova	Slovakia	DNF	—N/a
	4	Jakub Krako; Guide: Branislav Brozman	Slovakia	DSQ	—N/a

== Standing ==
Rank	Bib	Name	Country	Time	Difference
1st place, gold medalist(s)	11	Liang Jingyi	China	1:09.11	–
2nd place, silver medalist(s)	14	Markus Salcher	Austria	1:09.35	+0.24
3rd place, bronze medalist(s)	21	Alexis Guimond	Canada	1:10.02	+0.91
4	15	Arthur Bauchet	France	1:10.36	+1.25
5	19	Théo Gmür	Switzerland	1:11.31	+2.20
6	18	Robin Cuche	Switzerland	1:12.92	+3.81
7	22	Thomas Pfyl	Switzerland	1:12.97	+3.86
7	12	Manoel Bourdenx	France	1:12.97	+3.86
9	31	Santeri Kiiveri	Finland	1:13.40	+4.29
10	23	Aaron Lindström	Sweden	1:13.41	+4.30
11	40	Jeffrey Stuut	Netherlands	1:13.65	+4.54
12	34	Spencer Wood	United States	1:13.97	+4.86
13	41	Thomas Grochar	Austria	1:14.12	+5.01
14	27	Jordan Broisin	France	1:14.21	+5.10
15	25	Thomas Walsh	United States	1:14.55	+5.44
16	13	Nico Pajantschitsch	Austria	1:14.58	+5.47
17	30	Andrew Haraghey	United States	1:14.67	+5.56
18	28	Federico Pelizzari	Italy	1:14.70	+5.59
19	45	James Whitley	Great Britain	1:14.88	+5.77
20	39	Oscar Burnham	France	1:15.32	+6.21
21	36	Adam Hall	New Zealand	1:15.80	+6.69
22	38	Davide Bendotti	Italy	1:16.30	+7.19
23	20	Li Biao	China	1:16.35	+7.24
24	42	Gakuta Koike	Japan	1:16.43	+7.32
25	48	Martin France	Slovakia	1:16.79	+7.68
26	29	Christoph Bernhard Schneider	Austria	1:17.66	+8.55
27	43	Leander Kress	Germany	1:18.32	+9.21
28	17	Sun Yanlong	China	1:19.39	+10.28
29	35	Sun Hongsheng	China	1:20.88	+11.77
30	49	Marcus Nilsson Grasto	Norway	1:21.04	+11.93
	16	Connor Hogan	United States	DNF	—N/a
	24	Mitchell Gourley	Australia	DNF	—N/a
	26	Niu Shaojie	China	DNF	—N/a
	32	Hiraku Misawa	Japan	DNF	—N/a
	33	Roger Puig Davi	Andorra	DNF	—N/a
	44	Jules Segers	France	DNF	—N/a
	46	Tyler Carter	United States	DNF	—N/a
	47	Arvid Skoglund	Sweden	DNF	—N/a

== Sitting ==
Rank	Bib	Name	Country	Time	Difference
1st place, gold medalist(s)	55	Jesper Pedersen	Norway	1:09.69	–
2nd place, silver medalist(s)	62	Corey Peters	New Zealand	1:10.16	+0.47
3rd place, bronze medalist(s)	64	Taiki Morii	Japan	1:10.61	+0.92
4	58	René De Silvestro	Italy	1:11.54	+1.85
5	54	Jeroen Kampschreur	Netherlands	1:12.25	+2.56
6	60	Niels de Langen	Netherlands	1:12.66	+2.97
7	59	Floris Meijer	Netherlands	1:15.67	+5.98
8	75	Enrique Plantey	Argentina	1:15.89	+6.20
9	69	Aaron Ewen	New Zealand	1:16.04	+6.35
10	76	Brian Rowland	Canada	1:16.17	+6.48
11	53	Takeshi Suzuki	Japan	1:16.73	+7.04
12	52	Nicolás Bisquertt	Chile	1:17.06	+7.37
13	67	Lou Braz-Dagand	France	1:17.20	+7.51
14	66	Chen Liang	China	1:17.41	+7.72
15	56	Liang Zilu	China	1:18.00	+8.31
16	68	Murat Pelit	Switzerland	1:18.54	+8.85
17	63	Ravi Drugan	United States	1:18.79	+9.10
18	73	Han Sang-min	South Korea	1:19.43	+9.74
19	61	Li Xiang	China	1:20.68	+10.99
20	70	Pavel Bambousek	Czech Republic	1:22.51	+12.82
	50	Gong Zhaolin	China	DNF	—N/a
	51	Akira Kano	Japan	DNF	—N/a
	57	Igor Sikorski	Poland	DNF	—N/a
	65	David Allen Williams	United States	DNF	—N/a
	71	Sam Tait	Australia	DNF	—N/a
	72	Pascal Christen	Switzerland	DNF	—N/a
	74	Yan Hailing	China	DNF	—N/a
	77	Tetsu Fujiwara	Japan	DNF	—N/a

== See also ==
- Alpine skiing at the 2022 Winter Olympics
