= Netherlands at the Paralympics =

- Flag of the Netherlands
- IPC code: NED
- NPC: Nederlands Olympisch Comité * Nederlandse Sport Federatie
- Website: paralympisch.nl (in Dutch)
- Medals: Gold 337 Silver 292 Bronze 265 Total 894

Summer appearances
- 1960; 1964; 1968; 1972; 1976; 1980; 1984; 1988; 1992; 1996; 2000; 2004; 2008; 2012; 2016; 2020; 2024

Winter appearances
- 1984; 1988; 1992; 1994; 1998; 2002; 2006; 2010; 2014; 2018; 2022; 2026

The Netherlands participated in the inaugural Paralympic Games in 1960 in Rome, where it sent a delegation of five athletes. The country has participated in every subsequent edition of the Summer Paralympics. It made its Winter Paralympics début in 1984, and has taken part in every subsequent edition of the Games, except 2006. The Netherlands was the host country of the 1980 Summer Paralympics, in Arnhem.

Dutch athletes have won a total of 622 Paralympic medals, of which 239 gold, 208 silver and 175 bronze. 612 of these medals (including 237 of the gold) were won at the Summer Paralympics. This places the Netherlands ninth on the all-time Paralympic Games medal table - behind the United States, Great Britain, Canada, France, Australia, Germany, Austria and Poland.

The Netherlands’ most successful Games, in terms of ranking, were the 1976 Summer Games in Toronto, when it finished second (behind the United States). Numerically, the country won most medals at the 1984 Summer Games in New York City and Stoke Mandeville: 135 medals, of which 55 gold. The Netherlands consistently ranked in the top ten until 1996, included. Since then, they have experienced something of a decline. The 2004 Games marked the first time since 1964 that the Dutch had failed to win at least ten gold medals; they won five, and ranked at an all-time low of 27th.

Prior to 2014, Marjorie van de Bunt was the only Dutch athlete to have won medals at the Winter Paralympics. She won a gold in biathlon and three bronze in cross-country skiing in 1994, then a silver and a bronze in 1998, and a gold (in biathlon) and three silver (in cross-country skiing) in 2002. She has not competed again at the Paralympics since that date. The Netherlands were absent from the 2006 Games, and sent only a one-man delegation (Kees-Jan van der Klooster) to compete in alpine skiing in 2010; he did not win any medals. In 2014, flag-bearer Bibian Mentel took a gold medal in snowboarding.

== Medals ==
=== Summer Paralympics ===
Games	Athletes	Gold	Silver	Bronze	Total	Ranking
(Italy) 1960 Rome	18	3	6	0	9	8
(Japan) 1964 Tokyo	11	4	6	4	14	10
(Israel) 1968 Tel Aviv	35	12	4	4	20	8
(Germany) 1972 Heidelberg	39	14	13	11	38	5
(Canada) 1976 Toronto	58	45	25	14	84	2
(Netherlands) 1980 Arnhem	108	33	31	36	100	6
(United Kingdom) (United States) 1984 Stoke Mandeville & New York City	61	55	52	28	135	7
(South Korea) 1988 Seoul	110	30	24	29	83	8
(Spain) 1992 Barcelona	99	14	14	12	40	11
(United States) 1996 Atlanta	108	17	11	17	45	8
(Australia) 2000 Sydney	102	12	9	9	30	15
(Greece) 2004 Athens	95	5	11	13	29	27
(China) 2008 Beijing	83	5	10	7	22	19
(United Kingdom) 2012 London	91	10	10	19	39	10
(Brazil) 2016 Rio de Janeiro	126	17	19	26	62	7
(Japan) 2020 Tokyo	72	25	17	17	59	5
(France) 2024 Paris	84	27	17	12	56	4
(United States) 2028 Los Angeles
(Australia) 2032 Brisbane
Total		328	279	258	864	8

=== Winter Paralympics ===
Games	Athletes	Gold	Silver	Bronze	Total	Ranking
(Sweden) 1976 Örnsköldsvik	did not participate					
(Norway) 1980 Geilo	did not participate					
(Austria) 1984 Innsbruck	6	0	0	0	0	-
(Austria) 1988 Innsbruck	8	0	0	0	0	-
(France) 1992 Albertville/Tignes	7	0	0	0	0	-
(Norway) 1994 Lillehammer	6	1	0	3	4	15
(Japan) 1998 Nagano	3	0	1	1	2	20
(United States) 2002 Salt Lake City	4	1	3	0	4	15
(Italy) 2006 Turin	did not participate					
(Canada) 2010 Vancouver	1	0	0	0	0	-
(Russia) 2014 Sochi	7	1	0	0	1	14
(South Korea) 2018 Pyeongchang	9	3	3	1	7	10
(China) 2022 Beijing	8	0	3	1	4	16
(Italy) 2026 Milan/Cortina d'Ampezzo	8	3	3	1	7	9
Total		9	13	7	29	23

=== Medals by summer sport ===
Leading in that sport

Sport	Gold	Silver	Bronze	Total
Swimming	186	133	116	435
Athletics	33	46	42	121
Wheelchair tennis	23	15	13	51
Cycling	19	19	16	54
Table tennis	19	14	23	56
Shooting	5	3	8	16
Equestrian	4	7	12	23
Volleyball	3	3	1	7
Football 7-a-side	3	0	0	3
Archery	2	9	3	14
Wheelchair basketball	2	5	5	12
Triathlon	2	1	0	3
Sailing	1	1	2	4
Wheelchair fencing	0	1	2	3
Boccia	0	1	0	1
Dartchery	0	1	0	1
Rowing	0	1	0	1
Powerlifting	0	0	2	2
Goalball	0	0	1	1
Judo	0	0	1	1
Totals (20 entries)	302	260	247	809

=== Medals by winter sport ===
Leading in that sport

Sport	Gold	Silver	Bronze	Total
Alpine skiing	4	5	2	11
Snowboarding	3	4	1	8
Biathlon	2	0	1	3
Cross-country skiing	0	4	3	7
Totals (4 entries)	9	13	7	29

== Multi-medalists ==
Dutch athletes who have won at least three gold medals or five or more medals of any colour.

=== Summer Paralympics ===
No.	Athlete	Sport	Years	Games	Gender	Gold	Silver	Bronze	Total
1	Marijke Ruiter	Swimming	1972-1976	2	F	10	0	1	11
2	Alwin Houtsma	Swimming	1996-2000	2	M	7	2	1	10
3	Jetze Plat	Cycling; Triathlon	2012-2024	4	M	7	0	1	8
4	Alwin de Groot	Swimming	1992-1996	2	M	6	5	2	13
5	Monique Kalkman-van den Bosch	Wheelchair basketball Wheelchair tennis	1988-1996	4	F	4	2	1	7
6	Tristan Bangma	Cycling	2016-2024	2	M	5	1	0	6
6	Rogier Dorsman	Swimming	2020-2024	2	M	5	1	0	6
8	Irene Schmidt	Table tennis	1972-1980	3	F	5	0	1	6
9	Jennette Jansen	Athletics; Cycling; Wheelchair basketball	1988-2004, 2016-2024	8	F	4	4	3	11
10	Kelly van Zon	Table tennis	2008-2024	5	F	4	1	1	6
11	Ans Bouwmeester	Athletics	1984-1988	2	F	4	1	0	5
12	Patrick Bos	Cycling	2012-2020	3	M	4	0	2	6
13	Mitch Valize	Cycling	2020-2024	2	M	4	0	0	4
14	Liesette Bruinsma	Swimming	2016-2024	3	F	3	4	2	9
14	Willem Noorduin	Athletics	1988-2008	6	M	3	4	2	9
16	Chantalle Zijderveld	Swimming	2016-2024	3	F	3	3	2	8
17	Sanne Voets	Equestrian	2012-2024	4	F	3	3	1	7
18	Jacqueline Nannenberg	Swimming	1988-1996	3	F	3	1	1	5
19	Daniel Abraham	Cycling	2016-2024	3	M	3	0	1	4
20	Fleur Jong	Athletics	2020-2024	2	F	3	0	0	3
21	Diede de Groot	Wheelchair tennis	2016-2024	3	F	2	3	0	5
21	Aniek van Koot	Wheelchair tennis	2012-2020	3	F	2	3	0	5
23	Marlene van Gansewinkel	Athletics	2016-2024	3	F	2	2	3	7
24	Kenny van Weeghel	Athletics	2004-2020	5	M	2	2	2	6
25	Joop Stokkel	Equestrian	1996-2004	3	M	1	3	2	6
26	Lisa Kruger	Swimming	2016-2024	3	F	1	1	5	7

=== Winter Paralympics ===
No.	Athletes	Sport	Years	Games	Gender	Gold	Silver	Bronze	Total
1	Jeroen Kampschreur	Alpine skiing	2022-2026	2	M	4	1	0	4
2	Bibian Mentel	Snowboarding	2014-2018	2	F	3	0	0	3
3	Marjorie van de Bunt	Biathlon	1994-2002	3	F	2	4	3	9
4	Niels de Langen	Alpine skiing	2022-2026	2	M	0	3	2	5

== See also ==
- Netherlands at the Olympics
