= Netherlands at the 2014 Winter Paralympics =

- Flag of the Netherlands
- IPC code: NED
- NPC: Dutch Olympic Committee*Dutch Sports Federation

in Sochi
- Competitors: 7 in 2 sports
- Flag bearers: Bibian Mentel (opening ceremony); Anna Jochemsen (closing ceremony)
- Medals Ranked 14th: Gold 1 Silver 0 Bronze 0 Total 1

Winter Paralympics appearances (overview)
- 1984; 1988; 1992; 1994; 1998; 2002; 2006; 2010; 2014; 2018; 2022; 2026

The Netherlands sent a delegation to compete at the 2014 Winter Paralympics in Sochi, Russia, held between 7–16 March 2014. The Netherlands delegation consisted of seven competitors, all of which were competing in sports under the alpine skiing banner. Bibian Mentel won the nation's only medal at these Paralympics, a gold in women's snowboard cross. With one gold medal, the Netherlands ranked a joint 14th place on the medal table with Switzerland.

== Background ==
The Netherlands have competed in every Summer Paralympics since the inaugural event in 1960. Since making their debut at the third Winter Paralympics in 1984, they have missed the winter edition of the Paralympics only once, in 2006. Before the Sochi Paralympics, the Netherlands had won 10 Winter Paralympic medals, all by one person, Marjorie van de Bunt. The delegation sent to these Paralympics consisted of seven athletes: three skiers and four snowboarders. The Chef de Mission for the Netherlands in Sochi was Andre Cats. Bibian Mentel was chosen as the Dutch flagbearer for the Parade of Nations during the opening ceremony. Anna Jochemsen was selected as the flagbearer for the closing ceremony.

== Disability classification ==
Every participant at the Paralympics has their disability grouped into one of five disability categories; amputation, the condition may be congenital or sustained through injury or illness; cerebral palsy; wheelchair athletes, there is often overlap between this and other categories; visual impairment, including blindness; Les autres, any physical disability that does not fall strictly under one of the other categories, for example dwarfism or multiple sclerosis. Each Paralympic sport then has its own classifications, dependent upon the specific physical demands of competition. Events are given a code, made of numbers and letters, describing the type of event and classification of the athletes competing. Events with "B" in the code are for athletes with visual impairment, codes LW1 to LW9 are for athletes who stand to compete and LW10 to LW12 are for athletes who compete sitting down. Alpine skiing events grouped athletes into separate competitions for sitting, standing and visually impaired athletes.

== Medalists ==
Medal	Name	Sport	Event	Date
Gold	Bibian Mentel	Snowboarding	Women's snowboard cross (SB-LL2)	14 March

== Alpine skiing ==
=== Men ===
Kees-Jan van der Klooster was born in 1977, and broke his back in 2001, leaving him a paraplegic. He had previously represented the Netherlands in the 2010 Vancouver Paralympics. He competes in a sitting position, where he is classified as LW11. He competed in three events, however, he failed to complete any of them, falling in both the downhill and the super-G, recording three DNF's over his Paralympics.

Bart Verbruggen was born in 1988. He is classified as LW9-1 and competes in a standing position. He entered the downhill and the Super-G. In the downhill, he finished with a time of one minute and thirty seconds. The race was competitive, and despite being only six seconds back from gold medal position, he finished 14th and last of all competitors to complete the race. In the super-G, he failed to finish the race.

Athlete	Event	Run 1			Run 2			Final/Total		
Athlete	Event	Time	Diff	Rank	Time	Diff	Rank	Time	Diff	Rank
Kees-Jan van der Klooster	Downhill, sitting	—N/a						DNF		
Kees-Jan van der Klooster	Giant slalom, sitting	DNF								
Kees-Jan van der Klooster	Super-G, sitting	—N/a						DNF		
Bart Verbruggen	Downhill, standing	—N/a						1:30.32	+5.97	14
Bart Verbruggen	Super-G, standing	—N/a						DNF		

=== Women ===
Anna Jochemsen was born in 1985. She entered all five standing races in alpine skiing, and was classified as an LW2. On 8 March 2014 she competed in the downhill, but was unable to complete the race. Two days later, she took part in the Super-G, where she finished with a time of one minute and 35 seconds, good enough for 6th place, finishing roughly four and a half seconds off the podium. The next day, she failed to finish the first run of the Super combined. The slalom was contested the next day, over two legs, with both run times being added together to determine final standing. She was in silver medal position after finishing the first run with a time of one minute and one second; however she was significantly slower in the second run with a time of one minute and thirteen seconds, forcing her to settle for 7th place. The giant slalom was held on 16 March. She posted run times of one minute and thirty-four seconds and one minute and twenty seconds, to finish in 8th place out of 15 competitors.

Athlete	Event	Run 1			Run 2			Final/Total		
Athlete	Event	Time	Diff	Rank	Time	Diff	Rank	Time	Diff	Rank
Anna Jochemsen	Downhill, standing	—N/a						DNF		
Anna Jochemsen	Super-G, standing	—N/a						1:35.23	+ 11.03	6
Anna Jochemsen	Combined, standing	DNF								
Anna Jochemsen	Slalom, standing	1:01.82	+ 2.45	2	1:13.09	+ 12.61	9	2:14.91	+ 15.06	7
Anna Jochemsen	Giant slalom, standing	1:34.32	+ 9.34	12	1:20.20	+ 6.34	7	2:54.52	+ 15.68	8

=== Snowboarding ===
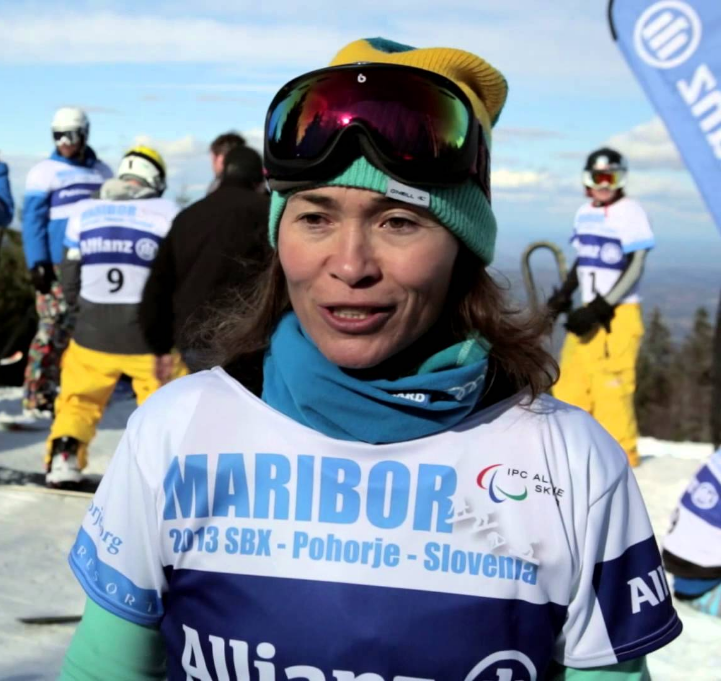
Bibian Mentel won a gold medal in snowboard cross at Sochi.

For the 2014 Winter Paralympics, snowboard cross was considered a discipline of alpine skiing, rather than a separate sport. Snowboarding was offered only for athletes who competed in a standing position. Each competitor was allowed to make three runs down the course, with their two best runs counting towards the final result.

==== Men ====
The Netherlands fielded two competitors for the snowboard cross—Merijn Koek (born in 1990) and Chris Vos (born in 1998)—there were 33 competitors in total. Koek had a slow first run with a time of one minute and twenty-one seconds, but improved dramatically with his second and third runs coming in just fractions of a second above one minute. He finished in 14th overall. Vos was more consistent, but became progressively slower with each run. Counting only his first and second runs, he finished in 13th place.

Athlete	Event	Race 1		Race 2		Race 3		Total	
Athlete	Event	Time	Rank	Time	Rank	Time	Rank	Time	Rank
Merijn Koek	Snowboard cross	1:21.94	26	1:00.78	13	1:00.63	11	2:01.41	14
Chris Vos	Snowboard cross	1:00.03	11	1:00.69	12	1:03.42	17	2:00.72	13

==== Women ====
There were 11 competitors that started in the snowboard cross on 14 March 2014. The Netherlands had two competitors entered, Lisa Bunschoten (born in 1995) and Bibian Mentel (1972–2021). Bunschoten was in 5th place for both her first and second legs, but crashed on her third run. She would finish 7th overall for the competition. Mentel fared much better than her teammate, she posted the best time in each run, and won the gold medal. This was the only Dutch medal in Sochi.

Athlete	Event	Race 1		Race 2		Race 3		Total	
Athlete	Event	Time	Rank	Time	Rank	Time	Rank	Time	Rank
Lisa Bunschoten	Snowboard cross	1:16.31	5	1:39.53	5	DNF	–	2:55.84	7
Bibian Mentel	Snowboard cross	1:00.18	1	58.89	1	58.54	1	1:57.43	1st place, gold medalist(s)

== See also ==
- Netherlands at the Paralympics
- Netherlands at the 2014 Winter Olympics
