= Netherlands at the 1998 Winter Paralympics =

- Flag of the Netherlands
- IPC code: NED
- NPC: Nederlands Olympisch Comité * Nederlandse Sport Federatie
- Website: paralympisch.nl (in Dutch)

in Nagano
- Competitors: 3 (2 men and 1 women) in 3 sports
- Medals Ranked 20thth: Gold 0 Silver 1 Bronze 1 Total 2

Winter Paralympics appearances (overview)
- 1984; 1988; 1992; 1994; 1998; 2002; 2006; 2010; 2014; 2018; 2022; 2026

Netherlands competed at the 1998 Winter Paralympics in Nagano, Japan. The team included 3 athletes, 2 men and 1 women. Competitors from Netherlands won 2 medals, including 1 silver and 1 bronze to finish 20th in the medal table.

== Medalists ==
Medal	Name	Sport	Event
Silver	Marjorie van de Bunt	Cross-country skiing	Women's 5 km Free Technique LW2-9
Bronze	Marjorie van de Bunt	Biathlon	Women's 7.5 km Free Technique LW2-4,6/8,9

Source: www.paralympic.org & www.olympischstadion.nl

== Alpine skiing ==
- Kjeld Punt
- Martijn Wijsman

== Biathlon ==
- Marjorie van de Bunt

== Cross-country skiing ==
- Marjorie van de Bunt

== See also ==
- Netherlands at the Paralympics
- Netherlands at the 1998 Winter Olympics
