= Netherlands at the 1994 Winter Paralympics =

- Flag of the Netherlands
- IPC code: NED
- NPC: Nederlands Olympisch Comité * Nederlandse Sport Federatie
- Website: paralympisch.nl (in Dutch)

in Lillehammer
- Competitors: 6 (5 men and 1 women) in 4 sports
- Medals Ranked 15thth: Gold 1 Silver 0 Bronze 3 Total 4

Winter Paralympics appearances (overview)
- 1984; 1988; 1992; 1994; 1998; 2002; 2006; 2010; 2014; 2018; 2022; 2026

Netherlands competed at the 1994 Winter Paralympics in Lillehammer, Norway. The team included 6 athletes, 5 men and 1 women. Competitors from Netherlands won 4 medals, including 1 gold and 3 bronze to finish 15th in the medal table.

== Medalists ==
Medal	Name	Sport	Event
Gold	Marjorie van de Bunt	Biathlon	Women's 7.5 km Free Technique LW2-9
Bronze	Marjorie van de Bunt	Cross-country skiing	Women's 10 km Classical Technique LW6/8/9
Bronze	Marjorie van de Bunt	Cross-country skiing	Women's 5 km Classical Technique LW6/8/9
Bronze	Marjorie van de Bunt	Cross-country skiing	Women's 5 km Free Technique LW6/8/9

Source: www.paralympic.org & www.olympischstadion.nl

== Alpine skiing ==
- Kjeld Punt
- Robert Reijmers
- Martijn Wijsman

== Biathlon ==
- Marjorie van de Bunt

== Cross-country skiing ==
- Marjorie van de Bunt

== Ice sledge speed racing ==
- Eelco Kooistra
- Arthur Overtoom

== See also ==
- Netherlands at the Paralympics
- Netherlands at the 1994 Winter Olympics
