= Austria at the 2022 Winter Paralympics =

- Flag of Austria
- IPC code: AUT
- NPC: Austrian Paralympic Committee
- Website: www.oepc.at (in German)

in Beijing, China 4 March 2022 – 13 March 2022
- Competitors: 16 (on foot) in 4 sports
- Flag bearers: Barbara Aigner; Markus Salcher
- Medals Ranked 6th: Gold 5 Silver 5 Bronze 3 Total 13

Winter Paralympics appearances (overview)
- 1976; 1980; 1984; 1988; 1992; 1994; 1998; 2002; 2006; 2010; 2014; 2018; 2022; 2026

Austria competed at the 2022 Winter Paralympics in Beijing, China which took place between 4–13 March 2022. In total, 16 athletes competed in four sports.

== Medalists ==
The following Austrian competitors won medals at the games. In the discipline sections below, the medalists' names are bolded.

Medal	Name	Sport	Event	Date
Gold	Veronika Aigner; Guide: Elisabeth Aigner	Alpine skiing	Women's slalom, visually impaired	12 March
Gold	Veronika Aigner; Guide: Elisabeth Aigner	Alpine skiing	Women's giant slalom, visually impaired	11 March
Gold	Johannes Aigner; Guide: Matteo Fleishmann	Alpine skiing	Men's giant slalom, visually impaired	10 March
Gold	Carina Edlinger; Guide: Lorenz Joseph Lampl	Cross-country skiing	Women's sprint, visually impaired	9 March
Gold	Johannes Aigner; Guide: Matteo Fleishmann	Alpine skiing	Men's downhill, visually impaired	5 March
Silver	Johannes Aigner; Guide: Matteo Fleishmann	Alpine skiing	Men's slalom, visually impaired	13 March
Silver	Barbara Aigner; Guide: Klara Sykora	Alpine skiing	Women's slalom, visually impaired	12 March
Silver	Johannes Aigner; Guide: Matteo Fleishmann	Alpine skiing	Men's super combined, visually impaired	7 March
Silver	Markus Salcher	Alpine skiing	Men's super-G, standing	6 March
Silver	Markus Salcher	Alpine skiing	Men's downhill, standing	5 March
Bronze	Carina Edlinger; Guide: Lorenz Joseph Lampl	Cross-country skiing	Women's 10 km, visually impaired	9 March
Bronze	Barbara Aigner; Guide: Klara Sykora	Alpine skiing	Women's giant slalom, visually impaired	11 March
Bronze	Johannes Aigner; Guide: Matteo Fleishmann	Alpine skiing	Men's super-G, visually impaired	6 March

**Medals by sport**
**Sport**	1st place, gold medalist(s)	2nd place, silver medalist(s)	3rd place, bronze medalist(s)	**Total**
Alpine skiing	2	5	2	**11**
Cross-country	1	0	1	**2**
**Total**	**5**	**5**	**3**	**13**

**Medals by gender**
**Gender**	1st place, gold medalist(s)	2nd place, silver medalist(s)	3rd place, bronze medalist(s)	**Total**
Male	2	4	1	**7**
Female	3	1	2	**6**
Mixed	0	0	0	**0**
**Total**	**5**	**5**	**3**	**13**

== Administration ==
Julia Wenninger served as Chef de Mission.

== Competitors ==
The following is the list of number of competitors participating at the Games per sport/discipline.

Sport	Men	Women	Total
Alpine skiing	9	4	13
Biathlon	0	1	1
Cross-country skiing	0	1	1
Snowboarding	2	0	2
Total	11	5	16

== Alpine skiing ==
Austria competed in alpine skiing.

Men

Athlete	Event	Run 1		Run 2		Total	
Athlete	Event	Time	Rank	Time	Rank	Time	Rank
Johannes Aigner; Guide: Matteo Fleischmann	Downhill, visually impaired	—N/a				1:13.45	1st place, gold medalist(s)
Johannes Aigner; Guide: Matteo Fleischmann	Giant slalom, visually impaired	55.91	2	53.43	1	1:49.34	1st place, gold medalist(s)
Johannes Aigner; Guide: Matteo Fleischmann	Slalom, visually impaired	40.22	2	46.88	1	1:27.10	2nd place, silver medalist(s)
Johannes Aigner; Guide: Matteo Fleischmann	Super combined, visually impaired	1:10.65	2	41.33	2	1:51.98	2nd place, silver medalist(s)
Johannes Aigner; Guide: Matteo Fleischmann	Super-G, visually impaired	—N/a				1:09.74	3rd place, bronze medalist(s)
Markus Gfatterhofer	Slalom, sitting	DNS					
Thomas Grochar	Giant slalom, standing	DNF					
Thomas Grochar	Slalom, standing	43.88	5	DNF			
Thomas Grochar	Super combined, standing	1:14.26	11	41.66	7	1:55.92	6
Thomas Grochar	Super-G, standing	—N/a				1:14.12	13
Nico Pajantschitsch	Downhill, standing	—N/a				1:19.21	10
Nico Pajantschitsch	Giant slalom, standing	1:00.05	9	58.57	8	1:58.62	9
Nico Pajantschitsch	Slalom, standing	DNS					
Nico Pajantschitsch	Super combined, standing	1:13.84	7	43.23	10	1:57.07	9
Nico Pajantschitsch	Super-G, standing	—N/a				1:14.58	16
Roman Rabl	Downhill, sitting	—N/a				DNF	
Manuel Rachbauer	Giant slalom, standing	1:08.35	29	1:04.97	27	2:13.32	27
Manuel Rachbauer	Slalom, standing	51.42	29	1:00.19	20	1:51.61	21
Markus Salcher	Downhill, standing	—N/a				1:15.25	2nd place, silver medalist(s)
Markus Salcher	Giant slalom, standing	1:00.27	11	59.44	10	1:59.71	11
Markus Salcher	Super-G, standing	—N/a				1:09.35	2nd place, silver medalist(s)
Michael Scharnagl; Guide: Florian Erharter	Downhill, visually impaired	—N/a				DNS	
Michael Scharnagl; Guide: Florian Erharter	Slalom, visually impaired	DNS					
Christoph Bernhard Schneider	Downhill, standing	—N/a				1:22.73	23
Christoph Bernhard Schneider	Super-G, standing	—N/a				1:17.66	26

Women

Athlete	Event	Run 1		Run 2		Total	
Athlete	Event	Time	Rank	Time	Rank	Time	Rank
Barbara Aigner; Guide: Klara Sykora	Giant slalom, visually impaired	58.04	3	1:01.89	2	1:58.93	3rd place, bronze medalist(s)
Barbara Aigner; Guide: Klara Sykora	Slalom, visually impaired	45.11	2	48.13	2	1:33.24	2nd place, silver medalist(s)
Veronika Aigner; Guide: Elisabeth Aigner	Giant slalom, visually impaired	54.08	1	58.46	1	1:52.54	1st place, gold medalist(s)
Veronika Aigner; Guide: Elisabeth Aigner	Slalom, visually impaired	44.12	1	47.41	1	1:31.53	1st place, gold medalist(s)
Eva-Maria Jöchl	Giant slalom, standing	DNF					
Eva-Maria Jöchl	Slalom, standing	DNF					
Elina Stary; Guide: Celine Arthofer	Giant slalom, visually impaired	58.82	4	1:02.13	3	2:00.95	4
Elina Stary; Guide: Celine Arthofer	Slalom, visually impaired	48.08	6	49.76	4	1:37.84	6

== Biathlon ==
Carina Edlinger competed in biathlon.

Women

Athlete	Events	Final		
Athlete	Events	Missed Shots	Result	Rank
Carina Edlinger; Guide: Lorenz Joseph Lampl	6 km, visually impaired	4	DNF	
Carina Edlinger; Guide: Lorenz Joseph Lampl	12.5 km, visually impaired	3	DNF	

== Cross-country skiing ==
Carina Edlinger competed in cross-country skiing.

Women

Athlete	Event	Qualification		Semifinal		Final	
Athlete	Event	Result	Rank	Result	Rank	Result	Rank
Carina Edlinger; Guide: Lorenz Joseph Lampl	1.5 km sprint visually impaired	3:23.38	1 Q	4:08.0	1 Q	3:49.6	1st place, gold medalist(s)
Carina Edlinger; Guide: Lorenz Joseph Lampl	10 km free, visually impaired	—N/a				43:13.9	3rd place, bronze medalist(s)
Carina Edlinger; Guide: Lorenz Joseph Lampl	15 km classic, visually impaired	—N/a				DNF	

== Snowboarding ==
Two snowboarders represented Austria.

Banked slalom

Athlete	Event	Run 1	Run 2	Best	Rank
Rene Eckhart	Men's SB-LL1	1:22.12	1:20.82	1:20.82	12
Bernhard Hammerl	Men's SB-LL2	1:38.00	1:25.15	1:25.15	24

Snowboard cross

Athlete	Event	Qualification			Quarterfinal	Semifinal	Final
Athlete	Event	Run 1	Run 2	Rank	Position	Position	Position
Rene Eckhart	Men's SB-LL1	1:13.15	1:14.87	12 Q	3	did not advance	
Bernhard Hammerl	Men's SB-LL2	1:18.47	DNF	21	did not advance		

Qualification legend: Q - Qualify to next round; FA - Qualify to medal final; FB - Qualify to consolation final

== See also ==
- Austria at the Paralympics
- Austria at the 2022 Winter Olympics
