= Netherlands at the 2002 Winter Paralympics =

- Flag of the Netherlands
- IPC code: NED
- NPC: Nederlands Olympisch Comité * Nederlandse Sport Federatie
- Website: paralympisch.nl (in Dutch)

in Salt Lake City
- Competitors: 4 (3 men and 1 women) in 2 sports
- Medals Ranked 15thth: Gold 1 Silver 3 Bronze 0 Total 4

Winter Paralympics appearances (overview)
- 1984; 1988; 1992; 1994; 1998; 2002; 2006; 2010; 2014; 2018; 2022; 2026

Netherlands competed at the 2002 Winter Paralympics in Salt Lake City, United States. The team included 4 athletes, 3 men and 1 women. Competitors from Netherlands won 4 medals, including 1 gold and 3 silver to finish 15th in the medal table.

== Medalists ==
Medal	Name	Sport	Event
Gold	Marjorie van de Bunt	Biathlon	Women's 7.5 km Free Technique standing
Silver	Marjorie van de Bunt	Cross-country skiing	Women's 10 km Free Technique standing
Silver	Marjorie van de Bunt	Cross-country skiing	Women's 15 km Free Technique standing
Silver	Marjorie van de Bunt	Cross-country skiing	Women's 5 km Classical Technique standing

Source: www.paralympic.org & www.olympischstadion.nl

== Biathlon ==
- Arnold Polderman
- Marjorie van de Bunt

== Cross-country skiing ==
- Kjeld Punt
- Martijn Wijsman
- Arnold Polderman
- Marjorie van de Bunt

== See also ==
- Netherlands at the Paralympics
- Netherlands at the 2002 Winter Olympics
