= Netherlands at the 2010 Winter Paralympics =

- Flag of the Netherlands
- IPC code: NED
- NPC: Nederlands Olympisch Comité * Nederlandse Sport Federatie
- Website: paralympisch.nl (in Dutch)

in Vancouver
- Competitors: 1 (1 men) in 1 sport
- Flag bearer: Falco Jeitsma
- Medals Ranked 22nd: Gold 0 Silver 0 Bronze 0 Total 0

Winter Paralympics appearances (overview)
- 1984; 1988; 1992; 1994; 1998; 2002; 2006; 2010; 2014; 2018; 2022; 2026

Netherlands competed at the 2010 Winter Paralympics in Vancouver, British Columbia, Canada. The team included 1 athletes, 1 men and 0 women. Competitors from Netherlands did not win any medals.

== Medalists ==
No medals are won during these Paralympic games.

== Alpine skiing ==
Athlete	Event	Final					
Athlete	Event	Run 1		Run 2		Total	
Athlete	Event	Time	Rank	Time	Rank	Time	Rank
Kees-Jan van der Klooster	Men's Downhill - Sitting					DNF	
Kees-Jan van der Klooster	Men's Giant Slalom - Sitting	1:31.03	23	1:36.08	19	3:07.11	17
Kees-Jan van der Klooster	Men's Super-G - Sitting					1:31.95	23

== See also ==
- Netherlands at the Paralympics
- Netherlands at the 2002 Winter Olympics
