= 2017 World Para Alpine Skiing Championships =

2017 World Para Alpine Skiing World Championships
- Host city: Tarvisio, Italy
- Nations: 30
- Events: Downhill, giant slalom, slalom, super combined, super-G
- Dates: 22–31 January

The 2017 World Para Alpine Skiing Championships was an international disability sport alpine skiing event held in Tarvisio, Italy from 22 to 31 January 2017.

The Championship is held biannually by the International Paralympic Committee (IPC). This was the first time the championship was held under the name World Para Alpine Skiing Championships.

== Events ==
=== Men ===
Event	Class	Gold	Time	Silver	Time	Bronze	Time
Downhill	Visually impaired	Mac Marcoux (CAN); Guide: Jack Leitch	1:10.98	Yon Santacana Maiztegui (ESP); Guide: Miguel Galindo Garces	1:11.55	Miroslav Haraus (SVK); Guide: Maros Hudik	1:11.80
Downhill	Sitting	Andrew Kurka (USA)	1:11.55	Corey Peters (NZL)	1:12.16	Akira Kano (JPN)	1:13.77
Downhill	Standing	Markus Salcher (AUT)	1:12.22	Kirk Schornstein (CAN)	1:13.84	Jeffrey Stuut (NED)	1:14.00
Super-G	Visually impaired	Mac Marcoux (CAN); Guide: Jack Leitch	1:04.22	Jakub Krako (SVK); Guide: Branislav Brozman	1:05.22	Giacomo Bertagnolli (ITA); Guide: Fabrizio Casal	1:05.82
Super-G	Sitting	Christoph Kunz (SUI)	1:04.35	Corey Peters (NZL)	1:05.05	Andrew Kurka (USA)	1:05.08
Super-G	Standing	Markus Salcher (AUT)	1:03.88	Arthur Bauchet (FRA)	1:04.09	Jeffrey Stuut (NED)	1:04.65
Slalom	Visually impaired	Mac Marcoux (CAN); Guide: Jack Leitch	1:23.79	Yon Santacana Maiztegui (ESP); Guide: Miguel Galindo Garces	1:25.09	Jakub Krako (SVK); Guide: Branislav Brozman	1:29.60
Slalom	Sitting	Jeroen Kampschreur (NED)	1:24.61	Igor Sikorski (POL)	1:24.98	Niels de Langen (NED)	1:26.76
Slalom	Standing	Arthur Bauchet (FRA)	1:25.33	Thomas Grochar (AUT)	1:26.27	Adam Hall (NZL)	1:26.71
Super combined	Visually impaired	Giacomo Bertagnolli (ITA); Guide: Fabrizio Casal	1:50.49	Mac Marcoux (CAN); Guide: Jack Leitch	1:51.97	Jakub Krako (SVK); Guide: Branislav Brozman	1:52.28
Super combined	Sitting	Jeroen Kampschreur (NED)	1:51.25	Taiki Morii (JPN)	1:52.29	Takeshi Suzuki (JPN)	1:52.70
Super combined	Standing	Mitchell Gourley (AUS)	1:51.51	Robin Cuche (SUI)	1:53.15	Markus Salcher (AUT)	1:53.81
Giant slalom	Visually impaired	Mac Marcoux (CAN); Guide: Jack Leitch	2:09.92	Giacomo Bertagnolli (ITA); Guide: Fabrizio Casal	2:12.92	Yon Santacana Maiztegui (ESP); Guide: Miguel Galindo Garces	2:14.86
Giant slalom	Sitting	Jeroen Kampschreur (NED)	2:16.75	Andrew Kurka (USA)	2:17.32	Markus Gfatterhofer (AUT)	2:18.41
Giant slalom	Standing	Arthur Bauchet (FRA)	2:13.63	Theo Gmur (SUI)	2:14.34	Alexis Guimond (CAN)	2:15.24

=== Women ===
Event	Class	Gold	Time	Silver	Time	Bronze	Time
Downhill	Visually impaired	Millie Knight (GBR); Guide: Brett Wild	1:13.42	Henrieta Farkasova (SVK); Guide: Natalia Subrtova	1:14.62	Eleonor Sana (BEL); Guide: Chloe Sana	1:19.02
Downhill	Sitting	Anna Schaffelhuber (GER)	1:18.05	Claudia Loesch (AUT)	1:18.28	Momoka Muraoka (JPN)	1:22.73
Downhill	Standing	Marie Bochet (FRA)	1:16.28	Andrea Rothfuss (GER)	1:17.91	Alana Ramsay (CAN)	1:18.63
Super-G	Visually impaired	Henrieta Farkasova (SVK); Guide: Natalia Subrtova	1:10.02	Eleonor Sana (BEL); Guide: Chloe Sana	1:14.34	Danelle Umstead (USA); Guide: Robert Umstead	1:16.53
Super-G	Sitting	Claudia Loesch (AUT)	1:08.97	Anna Schaffelhuber (GER)	1:09.42	Momoka Muraoka (JPN)	1:13.43
Super-G	Standing	Marie Bochet (FRA)	1:08.92	Alana Ramsay (CAN)	1:09.39	Andrea Rothfuss (GER)	1:10.93
Slalom	Visually impaired	Henrieta Farkasova (SVK); Guide: Natalia Subrtova	1:32.91	Millie Knight (GBR); Guide: Brett Wild	1:35.13	Noemi Ewa Ristau (GER); Guide: Lucien Gerkau	1:36.05
Slalom	Sitting	Anna Schaffelhuber (GER)	1:34.31	Anna-Lena Forster (GER)	1:34.80	Claudia Loesch (AUT)	1:36.84
Slalom	Standing	Andrea Rothfuss (GER)	1:36.51	Marie Bochet (FRA)	1:36.54	Anna-Maria Rieder (GER)	1:37.70
Super combined	Visually impaired	Henrieta Farkasova (SVK); Guide: Natalia Subrtova	1:58.89	Millie Knight (GBR); Guide: Brett Wild	2:03.62	Staci Mannella (USA); Guide: Sadie de Baun	2:07.92
Super combined	Sitting	Anna Schaffelhuber (GER)	2:00.27	Claudia Loesch (AUT)	2:06.25	Anna-Lena Forster (GER)	2:06.88
Super combined	Standing	Marie Bochet (FRA)	2:00.63	Andrea Rothfuss (GER)	2:03.13	Alana Ramsay (CAN)	2:05.18
Giant slalom	Visually impaired	Henrieta Farkasova (SVK); Guide: Natalia Subrtova	2:21.05	Millie Knight (GBR); Guide: Brett Wild	2:27.60	Menna Fitzpatrick (GBR); Guide: Jennifer Kehoe	2:30.63
Giant slalom	Sitting	Claudia Loesch (AUT)	2:22.12	Anna Schaffelhuber (GER)	2:24.90	Momoka Muraoka (JPN)	2:27.47
Giant slalom	Standing	Andrea Rothfuss (GER)	2:22.42	Marie Bochet (FRA)	2:23.13	Alana Ramsay (CAN)	2:28.46

== Medal table ==
Germany topped the medal tally with 14 medals. Hosts Italy finished 10th with 3 medals.

* Host nation (Italy)

Rank	Nation	Gold	Silver	Bronze	Total
1	Germany (GER)	5	5	4	14
2	France (FRA)	5	3	0	8
3	Canada (CAN)	4	3	4	11
4	Austria (AUT)	4	3	3	10
5	Slovakia (SVK)	4	2	3	9
6	Netherlands (NED)	3	0	3	6
7	Great Britain (GBR)	1	3	1	5
8	Switzerland (SUI)	1	2	0	3
9	United States (USA)	1	1	3	5
10	Italy (ITA)*	1	1	1	3
11	Australia (AUS)	1	0	0	1
12	New Zealand (NZL)	0	2	1	3
12	Spain (ESP)	0	2	1	3
14	Japan (JPN)	0	1	5	6
15	Belgium (BEL)	0	1	1	2
16	Poland (POL)	0	1	0	1
Totals (16 entries)		30	30	30	90

== Participating nations ==
30 nations participated.

- Andorra
- Argentina
- Australia
- Austria
- Belgium
- Bosnia and Herzegovina
- Canada
- Croatia
- Czech Republic
- Finland
- France
- Germany
- United Kingdom
- Hungary
- Iceland
- Italy
- Japan
- Netherlands
- New Zealand
- Norway
- Poland
- South Korea
- Romania
- Serbia
- Slovakia
- Slovenia
- Spain
- Sweden
- Switzerland
- United States
