= Netherlands at the 2026 Winter Paralympics =

- Flag of Netherlands
- IPC code: NED
- NPC: NOC*NSF

in Milan & Cortina d'Ampezzo, Italy 6 March 2026 – 15 March 2026
- Competitors: 8 (5 men and 3 women) in 2 sports
- Flag bearers: Claire Petit; Jeroen Kampschreur
- Medals Ranked 9th: Gold 3 Silver 3 Bronze 1 Total 7

Winter Paralympics appearances (overview)
- 1984; 1988; 1992; 1994; 1998; 2002; 2006; 2010; 2014; 2018; 2022; 2026

Netherlands will compete at the 2026 Winter Paralympics in Milan & Cortina d'Ampezzo, Italy, which will take place between 6–15 March 2026.

== Medallists ==
Medal	Name	Sport	Event	Date
Gold	Jeroen Kampschreur	Para alpine skiing	Men's super-G, sitting	9 March
Gold	Jeroen Kampschreur	Para alpine skiing	Men's super combined, sitting	10 March
Gold	Jeroen Kampschreur	Para alpine skiing	Men's slalom, sitting	15 March
Silver	Niels de Langen	Para alpine skiing	Men's downhill, sitting	7 March
Silver	Lisa Bunschoten-Vos	Para snowboard	Women's banked slalom, SB-LL2	13 March
Silver	Niels de Langen	Para alpine skiing	Men's giant slalom, sitting	13 March
Bronze	Niels de Langen	Para alpine skiing	Men's super combined, sitting	10 March

Medals by sport
Sport	1st place, gold medalist(s)	2nd place, silver medalist(s)	3rd place, bronze medalist(s)	Total
Alpine skiing	3	2	1	6
Snowboarding	0	1	0	1
Total	3	3	1	7

Medals by date
Day	Date	1st place, gold medalist(s)	2nd place, silver medalist(s)	3rd place, bronze medalist(s)	Total
Day 1	7 March	0	1	0	1
Day 3	9 March	1	0	0	1
Day 4	10 March	1	0	1	2
Day 7	13 March	0	2	0	2
Day 9	15 March	1	0	0	1
Total		3	3	1	7

Medals by gender
Gender	1st place, gold medalist(s)	2nd place, silver medalist(s)	3rd place, bronze medalist(s)	Total
Female	0	1	0	0
Male	3	2	1	6
Mixed	0	0	0	0
Total	3	3	1	7

== Competitors ==
The following is the list of number of competitors participating at the Games per sport/discipline.

Sport	Men	Women	Total
Para alpine skiing	3	2	5
Para snowboard	2	1	3
Total	5	3	8

== Para alpine skiing ==
Athlete	Class	Event	Run 1		Run 2		Total	
Athlete	Class	Event	Time	Rank	Time	Rank	Time	Rank
Niels de Langen	LW12–2	Men's downhill, sitting	—N/a				1:19.24	2nd place, silver medalist(s)
Niels de Langen	LW12–2	Men's super-G, sitting	—N/a				1:14.54	6
Niels de Langen	LW12–2	Men's giant slalom, sitting	1:06.40	2	1:04.61	1	2:11.01	2nd place, silver medalist(s)
Niels de Langen	LW12–2	Men's slalom, sitting	DNF					
Niels de Langen	LW12–2	Men's super combined, sitting	1:13.44	2	44.15	8	1:57.59	3rd place, bronze medalist(s)
Jeroen Kampschreur	LW12–2	Men's downhill, sitting	—N/a				DNF	
Jeroen Kampschreur	LW12–2	Men's super-G, sitting	—N/a				1:13.08	1st place, gold medalist(s)
Jeroen Kampschreur	LW12–2	Men's giant slalom, sitting	DNF					
Jeroen Kampschreur	LW12–2	Men's slalom, sitting	45.27	1	44.45	5	1:29.72	1st place, gold medalist(s)
Jeroen Kampschreur	LW12–2	Men's super combined, sitting	1:12.50	1	43.83	6	1:56.33	1st place, gold medalist(s)
Thijn Speksnijder	LW12–1	Men's downhill, sitting	—N/a				1:26.22	10
Thijn Speksnijder	LW12–1	Men's super-G, sitting	—N/a				1:22.67	17
Thijn Speksnijder	LW12–1	Men's giant slalom, sitting	1:12.39	12	1:15.17	13	2:27.56	11
Thijn Speksnijder	LW12–1	Men's slalom, sitting	54.53	15	51.96	15	1:46.49	14
Thijn Speksnijder	LW12–1	Men's super combined, sitting	DNF					
Claire Petit	LW2	Women's downhill, standing	—N/a				1:28.29	7
Claire Petit	LW2	Women's super-G, standing	—N/a				1:20.34	6
Claire Petit	LW2	Women's giant slalom, standing	1:15.95	8	DQ			
Claire Petit	LW2	Women's slalom, standing	DNF					
Claire Petit	LW2	Women's super combined, standing	1:23.00	7	52.24	10	2:15.24	10
Barbara van Bergen	LW11	Women's downhill, sitting	—N/a				DNF	
Barbara van Bergen	LW11	Women's super-G, sitting	—N/a				DNS	
Barbara van Bergen	LW11	Women's giant slalom, sitting	1:19.96	5	1:24.16	5	2:44.12	5
Barbara van Bergen	LW11	Women's super combined, sitting	DNS					

== Para snowboard ==
Banked slalom

Athlete	Event	Run 1	Run 2	Best	Rank
Dean van Kooij	Men's banked slalom, SB-UL	1:00.26	1:00.29	1:00.26	8
Chris Vos	Men's banked slalom, SB-LL1	1:02.84	1:02.70	1:02.70	7
Lisa Bunschoten-Vos	Women's banked slalom, SB-LL2	1:04.95	1:03.53	1:03.53	2nd place, silver medalist(s)

Snowboard cross

Athlete	Event	Seeding		1/8 final	Quarterfinal	Semifinal	Final	
Athlete	Event	Time	Rank	Position	Position	Position	Position	Rank
Dean van Kooij	Men's snowboard cross, SB-UL	54.09	12 Q	Bye	2 Q	4 FB	1	5
Chris Vos	Men's snowboard cross, SB-LL1	53.05	2	—N/a	2 Q	4 FB	1	4

== See also ==
- Netherlands at the Paralympics
- Netherlands at the 2026 Winter Olympics
