= Netherlands at the 1984 Winter Paralympics =

- Flag of the Netherlands
- IPC code: NED (HOL used at these Games)
- NPC: Nederlands Olympisch Comité * Nederlandse Sport Federatie
- Website: paralympisch.nl (in Dutch)

in Innsbruck
- Competitors: 6 (5 men and 1 women) in 3 sports
- Medals Ranked 15th: Gold 0 Silver 0 Bronze 0 Total 0

Winter Paralympics appearances (overview)
- 1984; 1988; 1992; 1994; 1998; 2002; 2006; 2010; 2014; 2018; 2022; 2026

Netherlands competed at the 1984 Winter Paralympics in Innsbruck, Austria. The team included six athletes, five men and one woman. Competitors from Netherlands won 0 medals to finish 15th in the medal table.

== Medalists ==
No medals are won during these Paralympic games.

== Alpine skiing ==
- Wiel Bouten
- Karel Hanse

== Cross-country skiing ==
- Tineke Hekman
- Jan Visser

== Ice Sledge Speed Racing ==
- Willem Hofma
- Henk de Jong

== See also ==
- Netherlands at the Paralympics
- Netherlands at the 1984 Winter Olympics
