= Netherlands at the 1992 Winter Paralympics =

- Flag of the Netherlands
- IPC code: NED
- NPC: Nederlands Olympisch Comité * Nederlandse Sport Federatie
- Website: paralympisch.nl (in Dutch)

in Tignes-Albertville
- Competitors: 7 (5 men and 2 women) in 3 sports
- Medals Ranked 20thth: Gold 0 Silver 0 Bronze 0 Total 0

Winter Paralympics appearances (overview)
- 1984; 1988; 1992; 1994; 1998; 2002; 2006; 2010; 2014; 2018; 2022; 2026

Netherlands competed at the 1992 Winter Paralympics in Tignes-Albertville, France. The team included 7 athletes, 5 men and 2 women. Competitors from Netherlands won 0 medals to finish 20th in the medal table.

== Medalists ==
No medals are won during these Paralympic games.

== Alpine skiing ==
- Thea Bongers
- Wiel Bouten
- Karel Hanse
- Robert Reijmers
- Martijn Wijsman

== Biathlon ==
- Jan Visser

== Cross-country skiing ==
- Tineke Hekman
- Jan Visser

== See also ==
- Netherlands at the Paralympics
- Netherlands at the 1992 Winter Olympics
