= Amelia Hodgson =

Australian skier and sighted guide

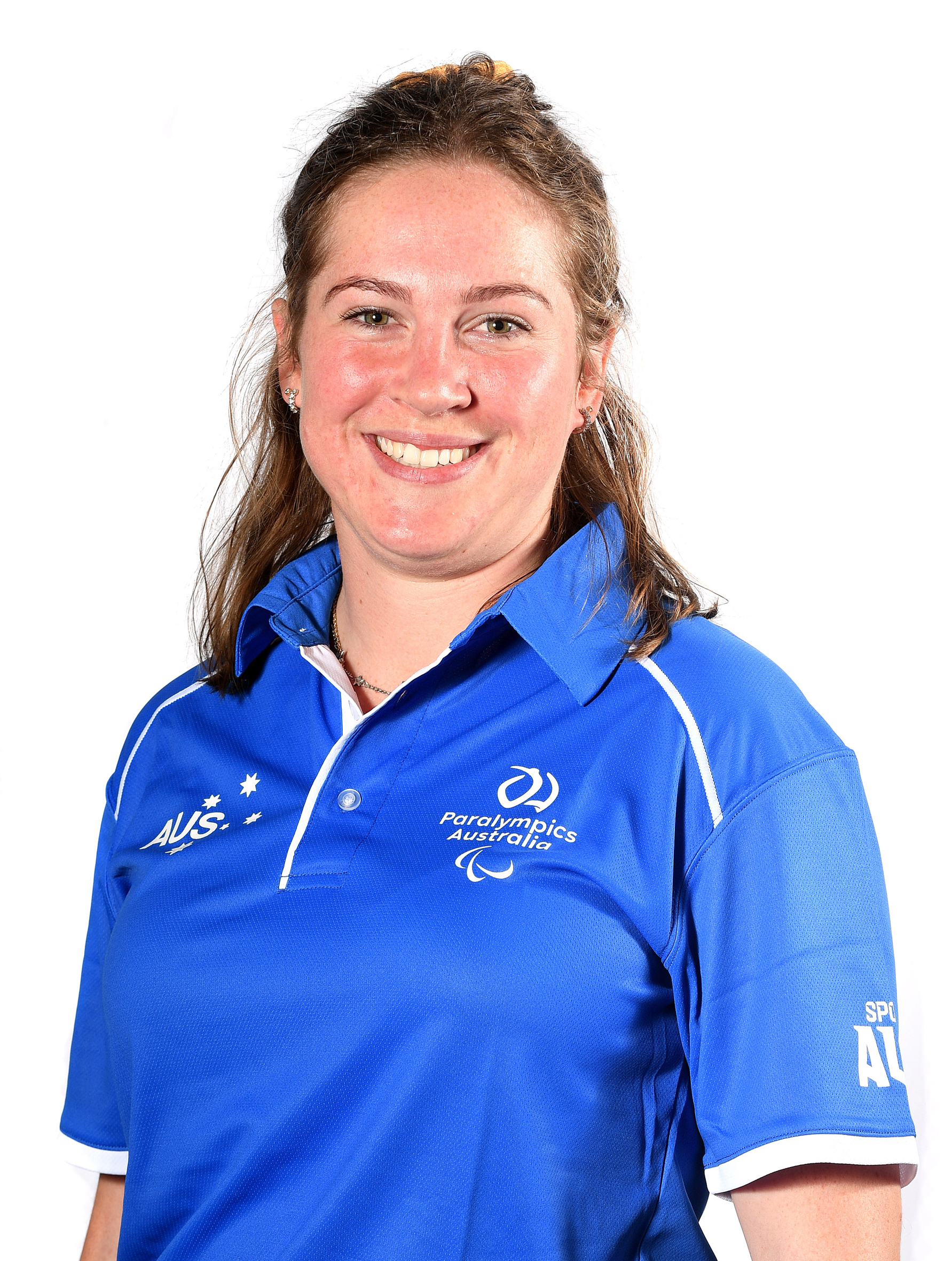
- Amelia Hodgson in 2021

Personal information
- Nationality: Australia
- Born: 29 June 1997 (age 28)

Sport
- Country: Australia
- Sport: Para-alpine skiing
- Event: Giant slalom slalom
Medal record
Guide for women's para-alpine skiing

Amelia Hodgson (born 29 June 1997) is an Australian skier and sighted guide for visually impaired skiers. She was Patrick Jensen's guide at the 2022 Winter Paralympics.

== Skiing ==
Hodgson lives in Jindabyne, New South Wales. She grew up ski racing and is a ski instructor and coach. Since 2019, Hodgson has been the sighted guide with Para-alpine skier Patrick Jensen. In the 2019–20 season, Jensen and Hodgson won three bronze medals in World Cup events.

At the 2022 Winter Paralympics Jensen with his guide Amelia Hodgson, competed in five events - 6th in Super G and 8th in the downhill and Slalom Visually Impaired events. He failed to finish in the giant slalom and Super G Combined.
