= Netherlands at the 2022 Winter Paralympics =

- Flag of the Netherlands
- IPC code: NED
- NPC: Nederlands Olympisch Comité * Nederlandse Sport Federatie
- Website: paralympisch.nl (in Dutch)

in Beijing, China 4 March 2022 – 13 March 2022
- Competitors: 8 (5 men and 3 women) in 2 sports
- Flag bearers (opening): Lisa Bunschoten; Chris Vos
- Flag bearer (closing): Niels de Langen
- Medals Ranked 16th: Gold 0 Silver 3 Bronze 1 Total 4

Winter Paralympics appearances (overview)
- 1984; 1988; 1992; 1994; 1998; 2002; 2006; 2010; 2014; 2018; 2022; 2026

Netherlands competed at the 2022 Winter Paralympics in Beijing, China which took place between 4–13 March 2022. In total, eight competitors competed in two sports.

== Administration ==
Retired wheelchair tennis player Esther Vergeer served as Chef de Mission.

Para-snowboarders Lisa Bunschoten and Chris Vos were the flagbearers for the Netherlands during the opening ceremony. Para-alpine skier Niels de Langen was the flagbearer during the closing ceremony.

== Medalists ==
Medal	Name	Sport	Event	Date
Silver	Chris Vos	Snowboarding	Men's banked slalom (SB-LL1)	11 March
Silver	Jeroen Kampschreur	Alpine skiing	Men's super combined (sitting)	7 March
Silver	Niels de Langen	Alpine skiing	Men's slalom (sitting)	13 March
Bronze	Niels de Langen	Alpine skiing	Men's super combined (sitting)	7 March

== Competitors ==
The following is the list of number of competitors participating at the Games per sport/discipline.

Sport	Men	Women	Total
Alpine skiing	4	1	5
Snowboarding	1	2	3
Total	5	3	8

== Alpine skiing ==
Barbara van Bergen, Floris Meijer, Jeroen Kampschreur, Niels de Langen and Jeffrey Stuut competed in alpine skiing. The sit skis used by the sitting alpine skiers were enhanced based on research by the Delft University of Technology.

Men

Athlete	Event	Class	Run 1		Run 2		Final/Total	
Athlete	Event	Class	Time	Rank	Time	Rank	Time	Rank
Jeroen Kampschreur	Downhill	Sitting	—N/a				1:19.08	5
Niels de Langen	Downhill	Sitting	—N/a				1:20.29	6
Floris Meijer	Downhill	Sitting	—N/a				DNF	
Jeffrey Stuut	Downhill	Standing	—N/a				1:20.89	17
Jeroen Kampschreur	Super-G	Sitting	—N/a				1:12.25	5
Niels de Langen	Super-G	Sitting	—N/a				1:12.66	6
Floris Meijer	Super-G	Sitting	—N/a				1:15.67	7
Jeffrey Stuut	Super-G	Standing	—N/a				1:20.89	17
Jeroen Kampschreur	Super combined	Sitting	1:11.99	3	38.52	1	1:50.51	2nd place, silver medalist(s)
Niels de Langen	Super combined	Sitting	1:13.04	4	40.36	4	1:53.40	3rd place, bronze medalist(s)
Floris Meijer	Super combined	Sitting	1:14.25	5	Did not finish			
Jeffrey Stuut	Super combined	Standing	Did not finish					
Jeroen Kampschreur	Giant slalom	Sitting	59.00	2	38.52	Did not finish		
Niels de Langen	Giant slalom	Sitting	1:06.92	15	59.58	4	2:06.50	7
Floris Meijer	Giant slalom	Sitting	1:07.01	17	1:02.18	8	2:09.19	10
Jeffrey Stuut	Giant slalom	Standing	1:04.85	20	1:02.25	19	2:07.10	20
Jeroen Kampschreur	Slalom	Sitting	41.58	2	Did not finish			
Niels de Langen	Slalom	Sitting	44.89	5	52.29	2	1:37.18	2nd place, silver medalist(s)
Floris Meijer	Slalom	Sitting	Did not finish					
Jeffrey Stuut	Slalom	Standing	51.32	28	1:00.72	21	1:52.04	22

Women

Athlete	Event	Class	Run 1		Run 2		Final/Total	
Athlete	Event	Class	Time	Rank	Time	Rank	Time	Rank
Barbara van Bergen	Downhill	Sitting	—N/a				DNF	
Barbara van Bergen	Super-G	Sitting	—N/a				1:28.42	4
Barbara van Bergen	Super combined	Sitting	1:23.76	3	Did not finish			
Barbara van Bergen	Giant slalom	Sitting	1:02.15	3	1:09.65	5	2:11.80	5
Barbara van Bergen	Slalom	Sitting	DSQ		—N/a			

== Snowboarding ==
Renske van Beek, Lisa Bunschoten and Chris Vos competed in snowboarding.

Banked slalom

Athlete	Event	Run 1	Run 2	Best	Rank
Chris Vos	Men's SB-LL1	1:12.08	1:12.06	1:12.06	2nd place, silver medalist(s)
Renske van Beek	Women's SB-LL2	1:23.26	1:23.35	1:23.26	11
Lisa Bunschoten	Women's SB-LL2	1:19.02	1:19.00	1:19.00	7

Snowboard cross

Athlete	Event	Qualification			Quarterfinal	Semifinal	Final
Athlete	Event	Run 1	Run 2	Rank	Position	Position	Position
Chris Vos	Men's SB-LL1	1:25.48	1:09.02	8 Q	2 Q	2 FA	4
Renske van Beek	Women's SB-LL2	DNF	1:25.99	12 Q	4	Did not advance	
Lisa Bunschoten	Women's SB-LL2	1:12.09	1:12.63	3 Q	2 Q	1 FA	DNF

Qualification legend: Q - Qualify to next round; FA - Qualify to medal final; FB - Qualify to consolation final

== See also ==
- Netherlands at the Paralympics
- Netherlands at the 2022 Winter Olympics
