= Alpine skiing at the 2014 Winter Paralympics – Women's snowboard cross =

Women's snowboard cross at the XI Paralympic Winter Games
- Paralympic alpine skiing
- Venue: Rosa Khutor Extreme Park, Krasnaya Polyana, Russia
- Dates: 14 March 2014
- Competitors: 12 from 7 nations

Medalists
1st place, gold medalist(s)		Bibian Mentel	Netherlands
2nd place, silver medalist(s)		Cécile Hernandez	France
3rd place, bronze medalist(s)		Amy Purdy	United States

The women's snowboard cross competition of the 2014 Winter Paralympics was held at Rosa Khutor Extreme Park near Krasnaya Polyana, Russia on 14 March 2014. It made its Winter Paralympics debut. The only classification taking part in this event were the standing athletes.

== Results ==
Each athlete will race the course 3 times and their top 2 times will be added together to get the total time.

Results of the women's snowboard cross
Rank	Bib	Name	Country	Race 1	Rank	Race 2	Rank	Race 3	Rank	Total	Difference
1st place, gold medalist(s)	4	Bibian Mentel	Netherlands	1:00.18	1	58.89	1	58.54	1	1:57.43	-
2nd place, silver medalist(s)	5	Cécile Hernandez	France	1:03.60	2	1:04.56	2	1:03.71	2	2:07.31	+9.88
3rd place, bronze medalist(s)	3	Amy Purdy	United States	1:08.61	3	1:06.88	3	1:07.41	3	2:14.29	+16.86
4	1	Cristina Albert	United States	1:10.55	4	1:30.75	4	1:24.71	5	2:35.26	+37.83
5	12	Heidi Jo Duce	United States	1:17.40	6	DSQ		1:20.03	4	2:37.43	+40.00
6	11	Astrid Fina Paredes	Spain	1:23.80	7	1:41.42	6	1:25.42	6	2:48.82	+51.39
7	6	Lisa Bunschoten	Netherlands	1:16.31	5	1:39.53	5	DNF		2:55.84	+58.41
8	7	Nicole Roundy	United States	1:24.10	8	1:59.54	10	1:35.47	7	2:59.57	+1:02.14
9	2	Michelle Salt	Canada	1:34.43	9	1:49.80	7	1:46.85	8	3:21.28	+1:23.85
10	8	Megan Harmon	United States	1:40.07	10	1:55.84	9	1:51.02	10	3:31.09	+1:33.66
11	9	Veronica Yoko Plebani	Italy	1:54.06	11	1:52.98	8	1:49.36	9	3:42.34	+1:44.91
DNS	10	Joany Badenhorst	Australia								

== See also ==
- Alpine skiing at the 2014 Winter Olympics
