= 2025 World Para Alpine Skiing Championships =

International para skiing competition

2025 World Para Alpine Skiing World Championships
- Host city: Maribor, Slovenia
- Events: Downhill, giant slalom, slalom, super combined, super-G
- Dates: 4–11 February

The 2025 World Para Alpine Skiing Championships was an international disability sport alpine skiing event held in Maribor, Slovenia from 4 to 11 February 2025. The championships are held biannually by the International Ski and Snowboard Federation (FIS).

== Medal summary ==
=== Men's ===
Event	Class	Gold	Time	Silver	Time	Bronze	Time
Downhill	Visually impaired	Cancelled					
Downhill	Sitting	Cancelled					
Downhill	Standing	Cancelled					
Super-G	Visually impaired	Cancelled					
Super-G	Sitting	Cancelled					
Super-G	Standing	Cancelled					
Giant slalom	Visually impaired	Giacomo Bertagnolli (ITA); Guide: Andrea Ravelli	2:05.84	Kalle Ericsson (CAN); Guide: Sierra Smith	2:06.16	Michał Gołaś (POL); Guide: Kacper Walas	2:08.25
Giant slalom	Sitting	René De Silvestro (ITA)	2:04.71	Jesper Pedersen (NOR)	2:05.38	Jeroen Kampschreur (NED)	2:06.34
Giant slalom	Standing	Arthur Bauchet (FRA)	2:03.40	Alexis Guimond (CAN)	2:06.14	Jules Segers (FRA)	2:08.05
Slalom	Visually impaired	Giacomo Bertagnolli (ITA); Guide: Andrea Ravelli	2:00.56	Kalle Ericsson (CAN); Guide: Sierra Smith	2:00.81	Michał Gołaś (POL); Guide: Kacper Walas	2:02.35
Slalom	Sitting	Jesper Pedersen (NOR)	1:58.44	René De Silvestro (ITA)	1:59.81	Niels de Langen (NED)	2:01.09
Slalom	Standing	Arthur Bauchet (FRA)	1:57.85	Robin Cuche (SUI)	2:02.85	Jules Segers (FRA)	2:03.66
Alpine combined	Visually impaired	Cancelled					
Alpine combined	Sitting	Cancelled					
Alpine combined	Standing	Cancelled					

=== Women's ===
Event	Class	Gold	Time	Silver	Time	Bronze	Time
Downhill	Visually impaired	Cancelled					
Downhill	Sitting	Cancelled					
Downhill	Standing	Cancelled					
Super-G	Visually impaired	Cancelled					
Super-G	Sitting	Cancelled					
Super-G	Standing	Cancelled					
Giant slalom	Visually impaired	Veronika Aigner (AUT); Guide: Elisabeth Aigner	2:05.96	Chiara Mazzel (ITA); Guide: Fabrizio Casal	2:09.82	Elina Stary (AUT); Guide: Vanessa Josefa Arnold	2:11.10
Giant slalom	Sitting	Momoka Muraoka (JPN)	2:17.96	Anna-Lena Forster (GER)	2:19.70	Liu Sitong (CHN)	2:23.05
Giant slalom	Standing	Ebba Årsjö (SWE)	2:07.93	Zhang Mengqiu (CHN)	2:12.23	Audrey Crowley (USA)	2:17.17
Slalom	Visually impaired	Veronika Aigner (AUT); Guide: Elisabeth Aigner	2:09.29	Chiara Mazzel (ITA); Guide: Fabrizio Casal	2:12.00	Alexandra Rexová (SVK); Guide: Sophia Polak	2:18.88
Slalom	Sitting	Anna-Lena Forster (GER)	2:19.72	Audrey Pascual Seco (ESP)	2:20.67	Liu Sitong (CHN)	2:21.65
Slalom	Standing	Ebba Årsjö (SWE)	2:06.87	Zhang Mengqiu (CHN)	2:11.90	Anna-Maria Rieder (GER)	2:18.02
Alpine combined	Visually impaired	Cancelled					
Alpine combined	Sitting	Cancelled					
Alpine combined	Standing	Cancelled					

== Medal table ==
* Host nation (Slovenia)

Rank	Nation	Gold	Silver	Bronze	Total
1	Italy	3	3	0	6
2	France	2	0	2	4
3	Austria	2	0	1	3
4	Sweden	2	0	0	2
5	Germany	1	1	1	3
6	Norway	1	1	0	2
7	Japan	1	0	0	1
8	Canada	0	3	0	3
9	China	0	2	2	4
10	Spain	0	1	0	1
10	Switzerland	0	1	0	1
12	Netherlands	0	0	2	2
12	Poland	0	0	2	2
14	Slovakia	0	0	1	1
14	United States	0	0	1	1
Totals (15 entries)		12	12	12	36
