= Els van Breda Vriesman =

Dutch sports administrator and jurist

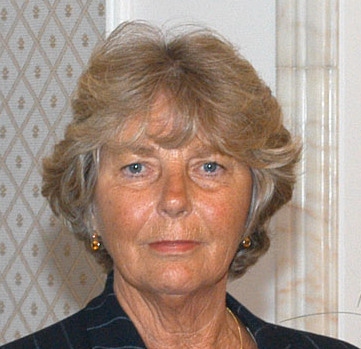
- Born: Els Commandeur; 18 March 1941 (age 85); Enschede, Netherlands
- Occupation: Sports administrator
- Children: 3
- Awards: Office of the Order of Orange-Nassau; 2010

Els van Breda Vriesman-Commandeur (née Els Commandeur, 18 March 1941) is a Dutch sports administrator and jurist.

Els Commandeur was born in 1941 in the Dutch city of Enschede. She studied law and was a field hockey player, achieving a position in the Dutch national youth team. She has been a sports administrator since the early 1980s, best known for her positions in field hockey. She was a board member of the Royal Dutch Hockey Association (the Dutch governing body of field hockey) for 14 years (until 1994), and was a representative to the International Hockey Federation. Between 1989 and 1993 she was also board member of the Dutch Olympic Committee.

In 1987 she was appointed as the technical delegate for the female field hockey tournament at the 1988 Summer Olympics in Seoul. She was chair of the technical commission of the Federation, and was from 1994 its secretary-general. In 2001 she was elected as president of the Federation, with an agenda for renewal of the sport. As such, she was also a representative in the International Olympic Committee and member of various IOC committees. After she lost her re-election in 2008 from Leandro Negre, she also resigned from those positions.

In 2010 van Breda Vriesman was appointed as Officer in the Order of Orange-Nassau for her work as volunteer for field hockey and sports.

== Personal life ==
Van Breda Vriesman is married has three children. Besides field hockey, she has also cycled and played golf.
