= Patrick Jensen =

Australia para-alpine skier

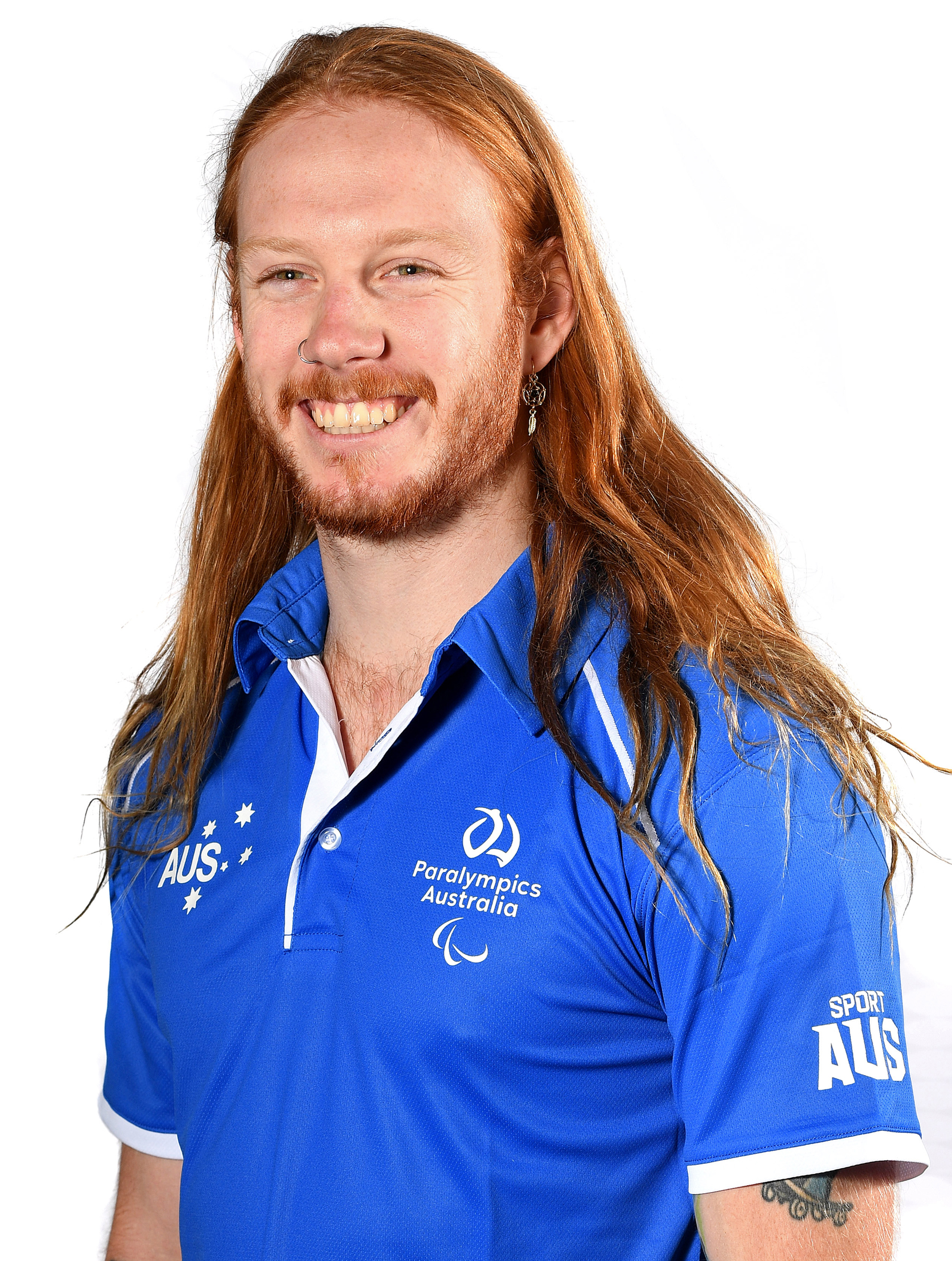
- 2022 Winter Paralympics Portrait

Personal information
- Nickname: Blinky
- Nationality: Australia
- Born: 2 February 1996 (age 30)

Sport
- Country: Australia
- Sport: Para-alpine skiing
- Disability class: B2
- Event(s): Downhill; Super-G; Giant Slalom; Slalom; Super Combined

Patrick Jensen (born 27 February 1996) is a B2 classified visually impaired Para-alpine skier from Australia. He represented Australia at the 2018 Winter Paralympics and the 2022 Winter Paralympics.

== Personal ==
At the age of seven, Jensen was diagnosed with macular dystrophy and Stargardt disease at the age of seven. Jensen has 70 per cent sight in his left eye, but his right is 70 per cent blind. He is the drummer of Newcastle, New South Wales based skramz band George Booth. In 2018, he was studying massage therapy at Evolve College and considering a career in physiotherapy after 2018 Winter Paralympics.

== Skiing ==
In 2013, Jensen attended a Disabled Wintersport Australia camp. In 2013, he debuted for Australia at the IPC Alpine Skiing World Cup in Thredbo, New South Wales. With his guide Lara Falk, they finished third in the Men's Giant Slalom B2 and Super-G B2 at the 2017 IPC Alpine Skiing Europa Cup in Veysonnaz, Switzerland. At the 2017 World Para-alpine Skiing Championships in Tarvisio, Italy, they finished ninth in the Men's Slalom B2.

At the 2018 Winter Paralympics, he competed in two events - 11th in the Men's Giant Slalom Visually Impaired and did not finish in the Men's Slalom Visually Impaired.

At the 2019 World Para Alpine Skiing Championships in Kranjska Gora, Slovenia, he finished seventh in both the Men's Downhill and Slalom Visually Impaired and ninth in the Men's Giant Slalom Visually Impaired.

At the 2022 Winter Paralympics with his guide Amelia Hodgson, he competed in five events - 6th in Super G and 8th in the Downhill and Slalom Visually Impaired events. He failed to finish in the Giant Slalom and Super G Combined.
