= Jeffrey Stuut =

Dutch para-alpine skier (born 1995)

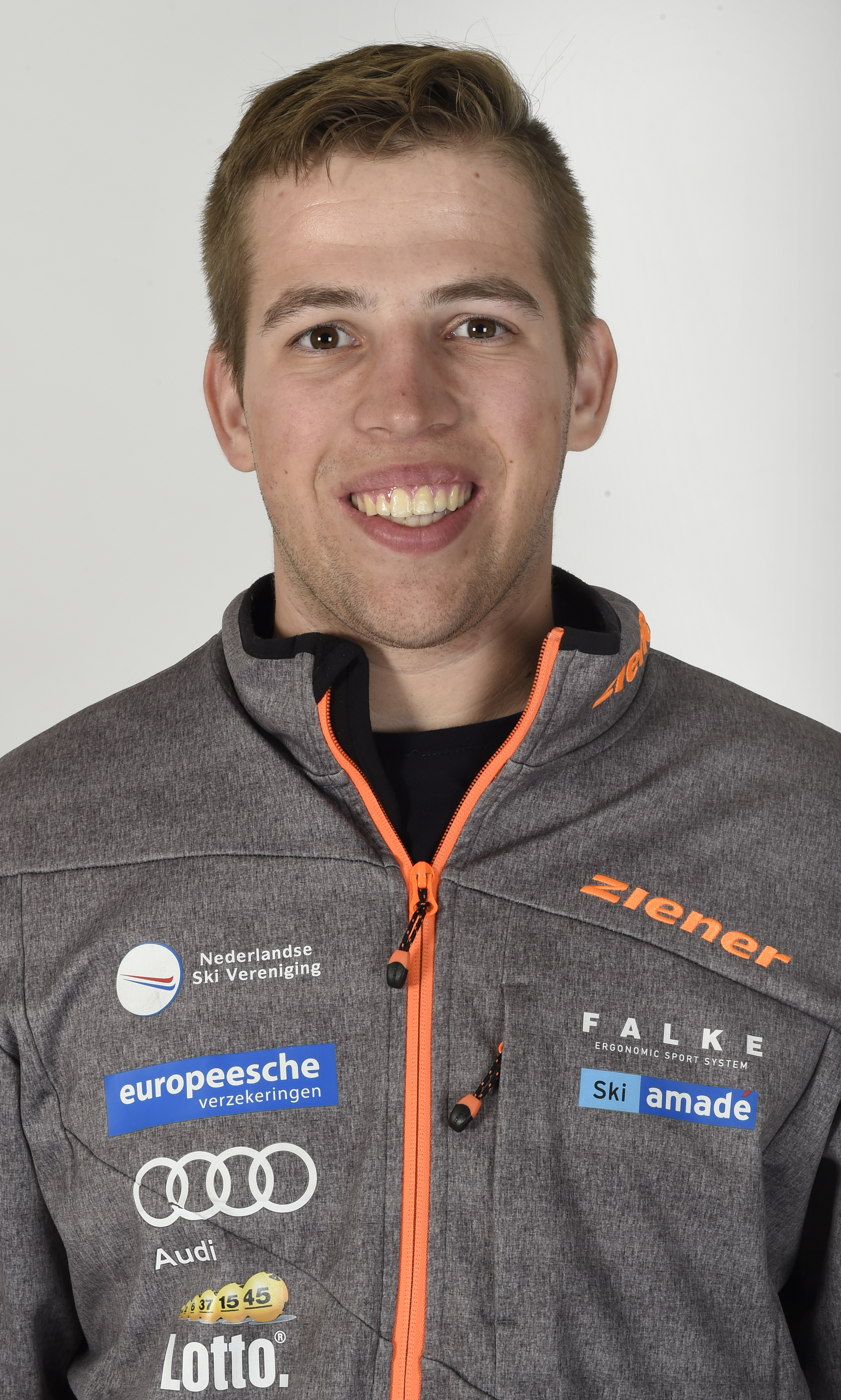

Personal information
- Born: 25 May 1995 (age 31) Hoorn, Netherlands

Sport
- Country: Netherlands
- Sport: Para-alpine skiing
- Disability class: LW3
Medal record
IPC Alpine Skiing World Championships
Bronze medal – third place	2017 Tarvisio	Downhill, standing
Bronze medal – third place	2017 Tarvisio	Super-G, standing

Jeffrey Stuut (born 25 May 1995) is a Dutch para-alpine skier.

He won bronze medals at the 2017 World Para Alpine Skiing Championships in both the Downhill and Super-G events. He represented the Netherlands at the 2018 Winter Paralympics held in Pyeongchang, South Korea.

He represented the Netherlands at the 2022 Winter Paralympics in Beijing, China. He competed in several alpine skiing events.
