= Jules Segers =

French Para alpine skier (born 2002)

Personal information
- Born: 18 November 2002 (age 23) Ambilly, Haute-Savoie, France

Sport
- Country: France
- Sport: Para alpine skiing
- Disability class: LW9-2
Medal record
Men's Para alpine skiing
Representing France
Paralympic Games
Bronze medal – third place	2026 Milano Cortina	Super-G standing
World Championships
Bronze medal – third place	2025 Maribor	Slalom standing
Bronze medal – third place	2025 Maribor	Giant slalom standing
World University Games
Silver medal – second place	2025 Turin	Giant slalom standing
Bronze medal – third place	2025 Turin	Super-G standing

Jules Segers (born 18 November 2002) is a French Para alpine skier. He represented France at the 2022 Winter Paralympics.

== Career ==
Segers represented France at the 2022 Winter Paralympics.

In January 2025, he competed at the 2025 Winter World University Games in para-alpine skiing and won a silver medal in the giant slalom and a bronze medal in the Super-G standing events. The next month he competed at the 2025 World Para Alpine Skiing Championships and won bronze medals in the slalom and giant slalom standing events.

In February 2026, he was selected to represent France at the 2026 Winter Paralympics.
