= Alexis Guimond =

Canadian para-alpine skier (born 1999)

Personal information
- Nationality: Canadian
- Born: 11 June 1999 (age 27) Houston, Texas, U.S.

Sport
- Country: Canada
- Sport: Paralympic alpine skiing
- Disability class: LW9
Medal record
Men's paralympic alpine skiing
Representing Canada
Winter Paralympics
Bronze medal – third place	2018 Pyeongchang	Giant slalom standing
Bronze medal – third place	2022 Beijing	Giant slalom standing
World Championships
Silver medal – second place	2025 Maribor	Giant slalom standing
Bronze medal – third place	2023 Lleida	Downhill standing

Alexis Guimond (born 11 June 1999) is an American-born Canadian male Paralympic alpine skier.

== Career ==
He made his first Paralympic appearance during the 2018 Winter Paralympics and competed in alpine skiing events. He claimed his first Paralympic medal, a bronze medal, in the men's giant slalom standing event at the 2018 Winter Paralympics.

He won the bronze medal in the men's super-G standing event at the 2022 Winter Paralympics.
