= Veronika Aigner =

Austrian Para alpine skier (born 2003)

Personal information
- Born: 13 February 2003 (age 23) Neunkirchen, Austria

Sport
- Country: Austria
- Sport: Para alpine skiing
- Disability: Visually impaired
- Disability class: AS3
Medal record
Women's Para alpine skiing
Representing Austria
Event	1st	2nd	3rd
Paralympic Games	6	1	0
World Championships	4	0	0
Total	10	1	0
Paralympic Games
Gold medal – first place	2022 Beijing	Giant slalom
Gold medal – first place	2022 Beijing	Slalom
Gold medal – first place	2026 Milano Cortina	Downhill
Gold medal – first place	2026 Milano Cortina	Super combined
Gold medal – first place	2026 Milano Cortina	Giant slalom
Gold medal – first place	2026 Milano Cortina	Slalom
Silver medal – second place	2026 Milano Cortina	Super-G
World Championships
Gold medal – first place	2023 Lleida	Giant slalom
Gold medal – first place	2023 Lleida	Slalom
Gold medal – first place	2025 Maribor	Giant slalom
Gold medal – first place	2025 Maribor	Slalom

Veronika Aigner (born 13 February 2003) is an Austrian visually impaired Para alpine skier. She is a six-time Paralympic gold medalist and four-time World Champion.

== Early life ==
Veronika Aigner was born with a visual impairment in 2003 to parents Petra, who is also visually impaired, and Christian Aigner. She was raised on the family farm in Gloggnitz in the Neunkirchen District of Austria with her four siblings. She began skiing before the age of two.

== Career ==
Aigner began competing in para alpine skiing when she was nine. She made her FIS Para Alpine Ski World Cup debut during the 2018–19 season, competing with her guide and sister, Elisabeth, in January 2019. At only 15 years old, she was too young to compete in that year's World Para Alpine Skiing Championships. She won five gold medals in the 2018–19 World Cup season and the season's crystal globe in slalom. Aigner won six races at the start of the 2019–20 season, but had an injury that, in combination with the COVID-19 pandemic, ended her season early.

In the first race of the 2020–21 World Cup in Veysonnaz, she won four of her five races. She tore a ligament and meniscus in both knees in January 2021 while training, ending her season. She was then in a car accident in November 2021 and was unable to compete in the 2022 World Championships. The giant slalom at the 2022 Winter Paralympics was her first race of the season. She won gold medals in the giant slalom and slalom events at the 2022 Paralympics.

Aigner competed at the 2023 World Para Alpine Skiing Championships and won gold in slalom and giant slalom events. She and her guide, Elisabeth, were awarded the Breakthrough Award at the 2023 Para Sport Awards. During the 2024–25 World Cup, she won the slalom, giant slalom, Super-G, and overall crystal globes. She again competed at the 2025 World Para Alpine Skiing Championships and won gold in slalom and giant slalom events.

She won the 2025–26 FIS Para Alpine Ski World Cup downhill and Super-G crystal globes. Despite being unable to compete in the final stop of the World Cup due to injury, she retained the overall crystal globe for the second consecutive year.

She competed at the 2026 Winter Paralympics and won a gold medal in the downhill event with a time of 1:22.55.

== Personal life ==
Aigner's siblings, twins Barbara, and Johannes, are both visually impaired para skiers. Her older sister, Elisabeth, is Aigner's sighted guide.

== World Cup results ==
=== Season standings ===
Season
Season	Age	Overall	Slalom	Giant slalom	Super-G	Downhill
2019	16	3	1	3	—	—
2020	17	3	2	2	—	—
2021	18	2	2	1	—	—
2023	20	1	1	1	—	—
2024	21	2	1	1	—	—
2025	22	1	1	1	1	—
2026	23	1	2	2	1	1
