= Kees-Jan van der Klooster =

Dutch para-alpine skier (born 1977)

Personal information
- Nationality: Dutch
- Born: 3 July 1977 (age 48) Vlissingen
- Website: www.sjeesonline.nl

Sport
- Country: Netherlands
- Sport: alpine skiing sitting
- Event(s): Downhill; Giant slalom Super G Monoski Cross
- Coached by: Falco Teitsma
Medal record
Men's Alpine skiing
Representing the Netherlands
Winter X Games
| Gold medal – first place | 2008 Aspen | Monoski Cross |
| Bronze medal – third place | 2007 Aspen | Monoski Cross |
| Bronze medal – third place | 2009 Aspen | Monoski Cross |
Extremity Games
| Gold medal – first place | 2008 Michigan | Sit wakeboarding |
EuroCup
| Gold medal – first place | 2008 La Molina | Super-G |
IPC Alpine Skiing World Championships
| Bronze medal – third place | 2011 Sestriere | Downhill |

Kees-Jan van der Klooster (born 3 July 1977) is a Paralympian athlete from Netherlands competing in alpine skiing events. In March 2001 he had a snowboard accident and broke his back. Since then he is paralysed from his waist down. His coach is Falco Teitsma.

He studied Marketing and Communication and is runnings his own business K-J Projects Unlimited Abilities, a company working on a better lifestyle for disabled people. His nicknames are Sjees or Sjace.

== Winter X Games ==
He is participating in the Winter X Games in the Monoski Cross. In 2007 and 2009 he won the bronze medal and in 2008 he won the Gold medal.

== 2010 Winter Paralympics ==
He competed in the 2010 Winter Paralympics in Vancouver, British Columbia, Canada. He participated in the Men's Downhill – Sitting where he did not finish, the Men's giant slalom – Sitting where he became 17th and the Men's Super-G – Sitting where he became 23rd.
