= Barbara Aigner =

Austrian para alpine skier (born 2005)

Personal information
- Born: 29 April 2005 (age 21) Gloggnitz, Lower Austria, Austria

Sport
- Country: Austria
- Sport: Para alpine skiing
- Disability: Visually impaired
- Disability class: B2
Medal record
Women's Para alpine skiing
Representing Austria
Paralympic Games
Silver medal – second place	2022 Beijing	Slalom
Bronze medal – third place	2022 Beijing	Giant slalom
World Championships
Gold medal – first place	2021 Lillehammer	Giant slalom
Silver medal – second place	2023 Lleida	Slalom
Bronze medal – third place	2023 Lleida	Giant slalom

Barbara Aigner (born 29 April 2005) is a former Austrian visually impaired Para alpine skier who competed at the 2022 Winter Paralympics.

== Career ==
Aigner made her debut at the 2021 World Para Snow Sports Championships where she won the gold medal in the giant slalom event. She then competed at the 2022 Winter Paralympics and won a silver medal in the slalom and a bronze medal in the giant slalom.

In January 2025, Aigner retired from competitive Para alpine skiing.

== Personal life ==
Aigner's twin brother, Johannes, and older sister Veronika are both visually impaired para skiers. She and her siblings have the congenital cataract condition as well as their mother.
