= Jeroen Kampschreur =

Dutch Para alpine skier

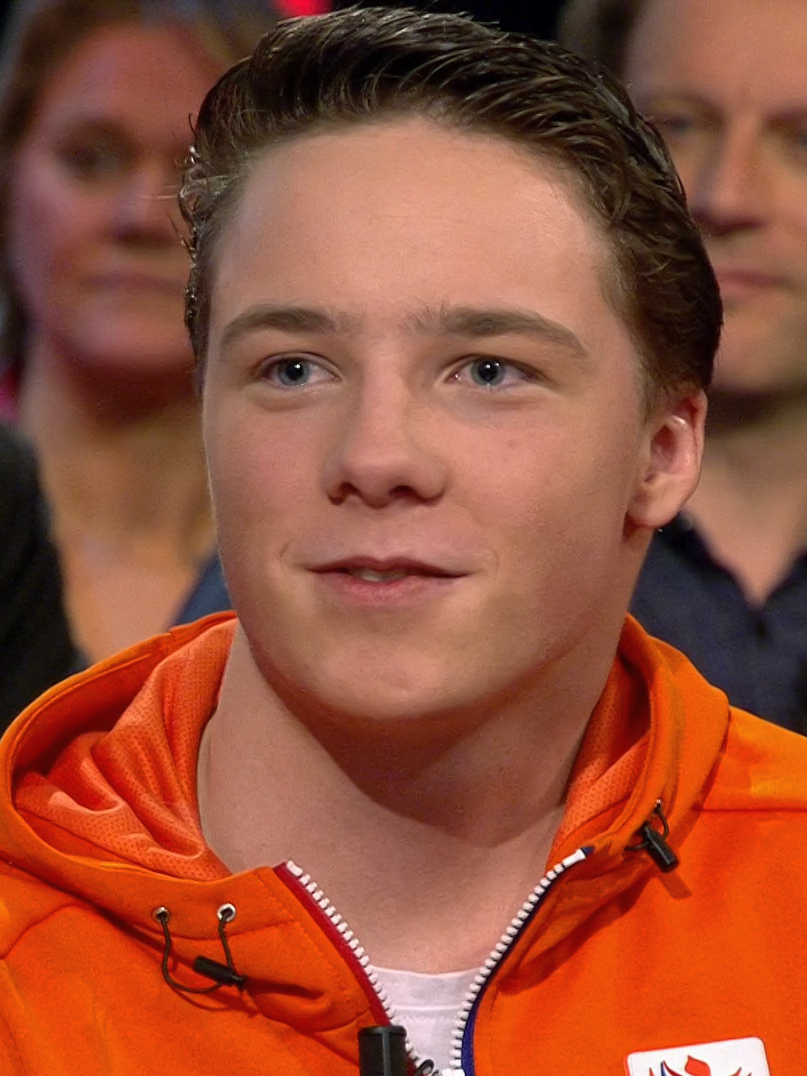
- Kampschreur in 2018

Personal information
- Nationality: Dutch
- Born: 9 April 1999 (age 27) Leiderdorp, Netherlands
- Height: 1.15 m (3 ft 9 in)
- Website: JeroenUnlimited.com

Sport
- Country: Netherlands
- Sport: Para alpine skiing; Wheelchair basketball
- Disability class: LW12-2
- Coached by: Falco Teitsma, Nick Elsewaerd
Medal record
Men's Para alpine skiing
Representing the Netherlands
Paralympic Games
Gold medal – first place	2018 Pyeongchang	Super combined sitting
Gold medal – first place	2026 Milano Cortina	Super-G sitting
Gold medal – first place	2026 Milano Cortina	Super combined sitting
Gold medal – first place	2026 Milano Cortina	Slalom sitting
Silver medal – second place	2022 Beijing	Super combined sitting
World Championships
Gold medal – first place	2017 Tarvisio	Giant slalom sitting
Gold medal – first place	2017 Tarvisio	Slalom sitting
Gold medal – first place	2017 Tarvisio	Super combined sitting
Gold medal – first place	2019 Sella Nevea	Giant slalom sitting
Gold medal – first place	2019 Sella Nevea	Slalom sitting
Gold medal – first place	2019 Sella Nevea	Super combined sitting
Gold medal – first place	2019 Sella Nevea	Downhill sitting
Gold medal – first place	2019 Sella Nevea	Super-G sitting
Gold medal – first place	2021 Lillehammer	Super-G sitting
Silver medal – second place	2021 Lillehammer	Downhill sitting
Silver medal – second place	2023 Lleida	Super-G sitting
Silver medal – second place	2023 Lleida	Giant slalom sitting
Bronze medal – third place	2023 Lleida	Downhill sitting
Bronze medal – third place	2023 Lleida	Alpine combined sitting
Bronze medal – third place	2025 Maribor	Giant slalom sitting
Para Alpine Skiing World Cup
Gold medal – first place	2017 Pyeongchang	Super-G sitting
Gold medal – first place	2017 Hakuba	Giant slalom sitting
Gold medal – first place	2017 Kransjka Gora	Slalom sitting
Gold medal – first place	2016 St. Moritz	Slalom sitting
Silver medal – second place	2017 Pyeongchang	Giant slalom sitting
Silver medal – second place	2017 Pyeongchang	Slalom sitting
Bronze medal – third place	2016 Kühtai	Slalom sitting
Bronze medal – third place	2016 Kransjka Gora	Giant slalom sitting
Para Alpine Skiing Europa Cup
Gold medal – first place	2015 Landgraaf	Slalom sitting

Jeroen Kampschreur (born 9 April 1999 in Leiderdorp) is a Dutch Para alpine skier and four-time Paralympic gold medalist. Kampschreur was born without shinbones, which resulted in both of his legs being amputated above the knee at age one. Consequently, he began using a wheelchair.

== Education ==
Kampschreur was a student at the Beekdal Lyceum in Arnhem, Netherlands. He followed a havo education and passed his exams in 2018.

== Career ==
Kampschreur practiced wheelchair basketball, and represented the Netherlands in U18 and U22 level competitions, at one point being the youngest player in the U22 team, but decided to focus on Para alpine skiing. He won three gold medals on the 2017 World Para Alpine Skiing Championships. Kampschreur has also achieved several podium placements in the Para alpine skiing World Cup and Europa Cup spread over the events slalom, giant slalom and Super-G. He won five gold medals at the 2019 World Para Alpine Skiing Championships

Kampschreur trains at the National Sports Centre Papendal in Arnhem, Netherlands. He has sessions twice a day, five days a week.

=== 2018 Winter Paralympics ===
Kampschreur participated in the 2018 Winter Paralympics where he won a gold medal in the men's super combined. This achievement made him the first Dutch athlete to win a medal in Para alpine skiing at the Paralympics. He was chosen to be the flag bearer during the closing ceremony.

=== 2022 Winter Paralympics ===
He represented the Netherlands at the 2022 Winter Paralympics in Beijing, China. He won the silver medal in the men's super combined sitting event.

=== 2026 Winter Paralympics ===
Kampschreur was selected as one of the Netherlands' flag bearers for the opening ceremony of the 2026 Winter Paralympics. He won his second career Paralympic gold medal on 9 March 2026, winning the men's Super-G sitting event in a time of 1:13.08. One day later, he secured another gold, winning the men's super combined sitting in a total time of 1:56.33. With this victory, Kampschreur surpassed former Para snowboarder Bibian Mentel as the most successful Dutch Winter Paralympian in history. On 15 March, Kampschreur took his third gold of the 2026 Games, winning the men's slalom sitting in a total time of 1:29.72 after establishing a dominant lead in the first run. Kampschreur and Para snowboarder Lisa Bunschoten were selected as the Dutch flag bearers for the closing ceremony.

== Awards and nominations ==
- Received the Zilveren Erespeld from the Municipal Government of Leiderdorp.
- Was named Allianz Athlete of the Month for January 2017 by the International Paralympic Committee.
- Was nominated for Paralympian of the Year 2017 by the NOC*NSF.
- Kampschreur was knighted in the Order of Orange-Nassau on 23 March 2018.
