= Johannes Aigner (alpine skier) =

Austrian Para alpine skier (born 2005)

Personal information
- Born: 29 April 2005 (age 21) Gloggnitz, Lower Austria, Austria

Sport
- Country: Austria
- Sport: Para alpine skiing
- Disability: Visually impaired
- Disability class: AS2
Medal record
Men's Para alpine skiing
Representing Austria
Event	1st	2nd	3rd
Paralympic Games	5	2	2
World Championships	4	4	0
Total	9	6	2
Paralympic Games
Gold medal – first place	2022 Beijing	Downhill
Gold medal – first place	2022 Beijing	Giant slalom
Gold medal – first place	2026 Milano Cortina	Downhill
Gold medal – first place	2026 Milano Cortina	Super-G
Gold medal – first place	2026 Milano Cortina	Giant slalom
Silver medal – second place	2022 Beijing	Super combined
Silver medal – second place	2022 Beijing	Slalom
Bronze medal – third place	2022 Beijing	Super-G
Bronze medal – third place	2026 Milano Cortina	Super combined
World Championships
Gold medal – first place	2021 Lillehammer	Slalom
Gold medal – first place	2021 Lillehammer	Parallel event
Gold medal – first place	2023 Lleida	Downhill
Gold medal – first place	2023 Lleida	Alpine combined
Silver medal – second place	2021 Lillehammer	Super-G
Silver medal – second place	2021 Lillehammer	Giant slalom
Silver medal – second place	2023 Lleida	Super-G
Silver medal – second place	2023 Lleida	Giant slalom

Johannes Aigner (born 29 April 2005) is an Austrian visually impaired Para alpine skier. He is a five-time Paralympic gold medalist, and four-time World Champion.

== Career ==
Aigner made his debut at the 2021 World Para Snow Sports Championships where he won gold medals in the slalom, and parallel event, and silver medals in the super-g and giant slalom events.

Aigner competed at the 2022 Winter Paralympics and won gold medals in the downhill and giant slalom. He also won silver medals in the super combined and slalom and a bronze medal in the Super-G.

He competed at the 2023 World Para Alpine Skiing Championships and won gold medals in the downhill and alpine combined, and silver medals in the Super- G and giant slalom events. He was subsequently awarded the Rising Star Award at the 2023 Para Sport Awards.

He won the 2025–26 FIS Para Alpine Ski World Cup overall crystal globe for the fifth consecutive season.

== Personal life ==
Aigner's twin sister, Barbara, and older sister Veronika are both visually impaired para skiers.

== World Cup results ==
=== Season titles ===
- 20 titles – (5 Overall, 5 Super-G, 4 Downhill, 3 Slalom, 3 Giant slalom)

Season	
Season	Discipline
2022	Overall
2022	Slalom
2022	Giant slalom
2022	Super-G
2023	Overall
2023	Downhill
2023	Slalom
2023	Super-G
2024	Overall
2024	Downhill
2024	Giant slalom
2024	Super-G
2025	Overall
2025	Downhill
2025	Super-G
2026	Overall
2026	Downhill
2026	Slalom
2026	Giant slalom
2026	Super-G

=== Season standings ===
Season
Season	Age	Overall	Slalom	Giant slalom	Super-G	Downhill
2021	15	6	—	—	—	—
2022	16	1	1	1	1	—
2023	17	1	1	3	1	1
2024	18	1	2	1	1	1
2025	19	1	2	2	1	1
2026	20	1	1	1	1	1
