= Niels de Langen =

Dutch Para alpine skier (born 1998)

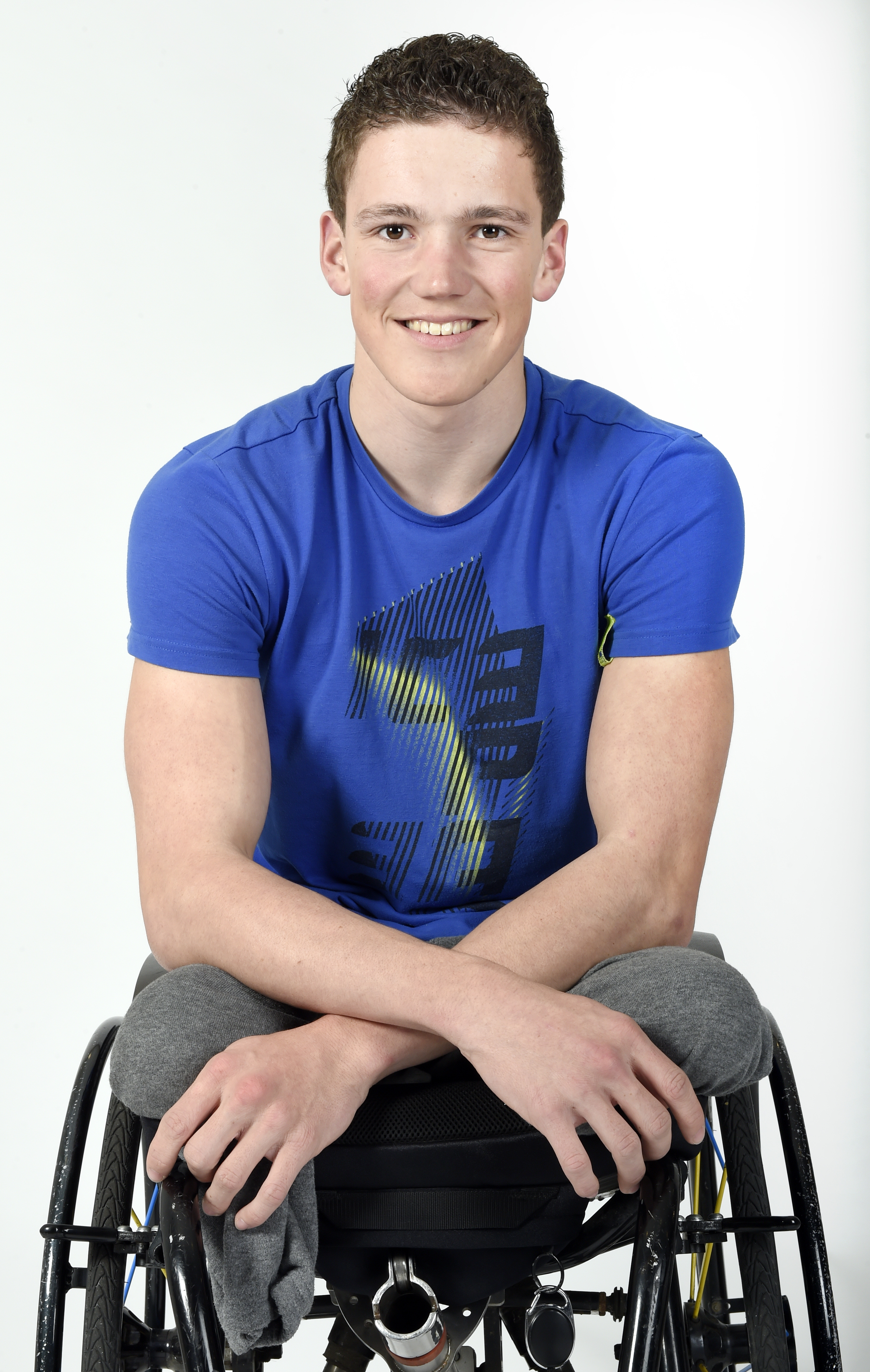
- Niels de Langen (2015)

Personal information
- Nationality: Dutch
- Born: 30 November 1998 (age 27) Arnhem, Netherlands

Sport
- Country: Netherlands
- Sport: Para alpine skiing
- Disability class: LW12.2
- Coached by: Falco Teitsma
Medal record
Men's Para alpine skiing
Representing the Netherlands
Paralympic Games
Silver medal – second place	2022 Beijing	Slalom sitting
Silver medal – second place	2026 Milano Cortina	Downhill sitting
Silver medal – second place	2026 Milano Cortina	Giant slalom sitting
Bronze medal – third place	2022 Beijing	Super combined sitting
Bronze medal – third place	2026 Milano Cortina	Super combined sitting
World Championships
Silver medal – second place	2019 Sella Nevea/Kranjska Gora	Giant slalom sitting
Bronze medal – third place	2017 Tarvisio	Slalom sitting
Bronze medal – third place	2023 Lleida	Giant slalom sitting
Bronze medal – third place	2025 Maribor	Slalom sitting

Niels de Langen (born 30 November 1998) is a Dutch Para alpine skier and five-time Paralympic medalist.

== Early life ==
De Langen was born in 1998 in Arnhem, Netherlands. In the first year of his life he lost his right leg due to meningococcal disease. At 16 years of age, in June 2015, he decided to amputate his left leg which was also damaged as a result of the infection.

== Career ==
De Langen won a bronze medal at the 2017 World Para Alpine Skiing Championships at the slalom event.

De Langen represented the Netherlands at the 2018 Winter Paralympics and competed in all five disciplines: the Men's downhill, Men's super-G, Men's super combined, Men's giant slalom and Men's slalom events.

In 2019, De Langen won a silver medal at the World Para Alpine Skiing Championships in the giant slalom event. In 2022, he won the bronze medal in the men's sitting super combined event at the 2021 World Para Snow Sports Championships. He also won the bronze medal in the men's sitting slalom event.

He represented the Netherlands at the 2022 Winter Paralympics. He won the silver medal in the men's slalom and the bronze medal in the men's super combined sitting events. De Langen was the flagbearer for the Netherlands during the closing ceremony of the 2022 Winter Paralympics.

He won the bronze medal in the men's sitting giant slalom event at the 2023 World Para Alpine Skiing Championships held in Lleida, Spain.

De Langen represented the Netherlands at the 2026 Winter Paralympics. He won the silver medal in the men's downhill sitting event. Three days later, he took bronze in the men's super combined sitting. On 13 March, De Langen secured his third medal of the 2026 Games, taking silver in the giant slalom sitting.

== Personal life ==
He studies physiotherapy.
