= Marjorie van de Bunt =

Dutch Paralympic athlete

Personal information
- Nationality: Dutch
- Born: 1 July 1968 (age 57) Reeuwijk, Netherlands

Sport
- Country: Netherlands
- Sport: Biathlon; Cross-country skiing
Medal record
Women's Skiing
Representing the Netherlands
Paralympic Games
Gold medal – first place	2002; Salt Lake City	Biathlon (7.5 km Free)
Gold medal – first place	1994 Lillehammer	Biathlon (7.5 km Free)
Bronze medal – third place	1998 Nagano	Biathlon (7.5 km Free)
Silver medal – second place	2002; Salt Lake City	Cross-country skiing (5 km Classical)
Silver medal – second place	1998 Nagano	Cross-country skiing (5 km Classical)
Bronze medal – third place	1994 Lillehammer	Cross-country skiing (5 km Classical)
Bronze medal – third place	1994 Lillehammer	Cross-country skiing (10 km Classical)
Bronze medal – third place	1994 Lillehammer	Cross-country skiing (5 km Free)
Silver medal – second place	2002; Salt Lake City	Cross-country skiing (10 km Free)
Silver medal – second place	2002; Salt Lake City	Cross-country skiing (15 km Free)
IPC Biathlon and Cross-Country Skiing World Championships
Silver medal – second place	2000 Crans Montana	Biathlon
Silver medal – second place	2000 Crans Montana	Cross-country skiing (15 km)
Silver medal – second place	2000 Crans Montana	Cross-country skiing (10 km)
- Updated on October 2012

Marjorie van de Bunt (born in Reeuwijk, 1 July 1968) is a Dutch Paralympian athlete competing in biathlon and cross-country skiing events.

Van de Bunt has had a handicap on her left arm since she was five years old. At the age of thirteen she started with cross-country skiing as well as biathlon.

She took part in three Winter Paralympic Games competing in the biathlon and cross-country skiing events. Over the course of her Paralympic career, she won a total of 10 medals. She retired from competition in 2002.

== Winter Paralympic Games ==
=== Biathlon ===
Year	Rank	Real Time	Misses	Factor	Finish Time
1994	1st place, gold medalist(s)	32:16.5	0	95%	30:39.6
1998	3rd place, bronze medalist(s)	36:16.5	2	95%	34:33.6
2002	1st place, gold medalist(s)	22:42.3	0	97%	22:01.4

Source: www.paralympic.org

=== Cross-country skiing ===
Year	Rank	Real Time	Factor	Finish Time
Women's 5 km Classical Technique
1994	3rd place, bronze medalist(s)	18:07.0	92%	16:40.0
2002	2nd place, silver medalist(s)	16:26.9	92%	15:07.9
Women's 5 km Free Technique
1994	3rd place, bronze medalist(s)	15:12.5	95%	14:26.8
1998	2nd place, silver medalist(s)	16:27.4	95%	15:38.0
Women's 10 km Classical Technique
1994	3rd place, bronze medalist(s)	55:02.0	92%	50:37.8
Women's 10 km Free Technique
2002	2nd place, silver medalist(s)	30:17.4	97%	29:22.8
Women's 15 km Free Technique
2002	2nd place, silver medalist(s)	49:22.8	97%	47:53.9

Source: www.paralympic.org
