= NOC*NSF =

Dutch sports organisation

- Country: Netherlands
- Code: NED
- Created: 1912 (Olympic committee)
- Recognized: 1912
- Continental Association: EOC
- Headquarters: National Sports Centre Papendal, near Arnhem, Netherlands
- President: Anneke van Zaken-Nieberg
- Secretary General: Marc van den Tweel
- Website: www.nocnsf.nl
- Notes: Also includes the following constituent countries: Curaçao; Sint Maarten

NPC*NEDERLAND

National Paralympic Committee
- Country: Netherlands
- Code: NED
- Created: 2007
- Recognized: 2007
- Continental association: EPC
- Headquarters: National Sports Centre Papendal, near Arnhem, Netherlands
- President: Raymon Blondel
- Secretary General: Marc van den Tweel
- Website: www.paralympisch.nl
- Notes: Also includes the following constituent countries: Curaçao; Sint Maarten

The Dutch Olympic Committee*Dutch Sports Federation (Dutch: Nederlands Olympisch Comité*Nederlandse Sport Federatie; IOC Code: NED), generally abbreviated NOC*NSF, is the overall coordinating Dutch sports organisation that also functions as the Dutch National Olympic Committee and National Paralympic Committee. NOC*NSF, based at the National Sports Centre Papendal in Arnhem, is the umbrella organisation for sports in the Netherlands, representing more than 23,000 sports clubs and 5.2 million Dutch people involved in sports.

== IOC members ==
Member	Term
Baron Frits van Tuyll van Serooskerken	1898–1924
Baron Alphert Schimmelpenninck van der Oye	1925–1943
P. W. Scharroo	1924–1957
Charles Pahud de Mortanges	1946–1964
Herman Adriaan van Karnebeek (1903-1989)	1964–1977
Kees Kerdel	1977–1986
Els van Breda Vriesman	2001–2008
Anton Geesink	1987–2010
Hein Verbruggen	1998–2008
Willem-Alexander of the Netherlands	1998–2013
Camiel Eurlings	2013–2018

== Team NL ==
Team NL is the sports team project with the goal of closer association of athletes and fans. It was created joined forces 29 sports associations and NOC*NSF that represents the Dutch athletes 365 days a year at an international top level at European Championships, World Championships and Olympic and Paralympic Games.

== Controversy ==
In 2024, the Committee nominated beach volleyball player Steven van de Velde for its 2024 Olympic team, disregarding the fact that he is a convicted child rapist and has been placed on the sex offender registry in the United Kingdom for life since 2016. The Committee stood by their nomination despite his criminal record for sex crimes and even after the outcry from the British and American public, asserting that van de Velde has "served his sentence".

== See also ==
- Netherlands at the Olympics
- Netherlands at the Paralympics
