= Alpine skiing at the 2006 Winter Paralympics – Men's super-G =

Alpine skiing – Men's Super-G at the IX Paralympic Winter Games
- Venue: Sestriere

Men's super-G events at the 2006 Winter Paralympics were contested at Sestriere on 13—14 March.

There were 3 events. Each was contested by skiers from a range of disability classes, and the standings were decided by applying a disability factor to the actual times achieved.

== Visually impaired ==
The visually impaired event took place on 14 March. It was won by Gianmaria Dal Maistro, representing Italy.

Rank	Name	Country	Class	Real Time	Calc Time	Difference
1st place, gold medalist(s)	Gianmaria Dal Maistro; Guide: Tommaso Balasso	Italy	B3	1:23.32	1:14.16	
2nd place, silver medalist(s)	Radomir Dudas; Guide: Maros Hudik	Slovakia	B2	1:27.03	1:14.37	+0.21
3rd place, bronze medalist(s)	Chris Williamson; Guide: Robert Taylor	Canada	B3	1:23.74	1:14.53	+0.37
4	Eric Villalon; Guide: Hodei Yurrita	Spain	B2	1:28.17	1:15.35	+1.19
5	Miroslav Haraus; Guide: Miroslav Bulovsky	Slovakia	B2	1:33.69	1:20.06	+5.90
6	Jakub Krako; Guide: Juraj Medera	Slovakia	B3	1:35.58	1:25.07	+10.91
7	Julian Hadschieff; Guide: Stefan Schoner	Austria	B2	1:42.07	1:27.22	+13.06
8	Stefan Kopcik; Guide: Dusan Simo	Slovakia	B2	1:42.74	1:27.80	+13.64
-	Daniel Cintula; Guide: Michal Cerven	Slovakia	B2	DNF		
-	Nicolas Berejny; Guide: Sophie Troc	France	B2	DNF		
-	Gerd Gradwohl; Guide: Karl Heinz Vachenauer	Germany	B2	DSQ		
-	Luigi Bertanza; Guide: Ivan Morlotti	Italy	B1	DSQ		

== Sitting ==
The sitting event took place on 14 March. It was won by Martin Braxenthaler, representing Germany.

Rank	Name	Country	Class	Real Time	Calc Time	Difference
1st place, gold medalist(s)	Martin Braxenthaler	Germany	LW10-2	1:30.90	1:12.83	
2nd place, silver medalist(s)	Harald Eder	Austria	LW11	1:29.57	1:14.43	+1.60
3rd place, bronze medalist(s)	Robert Froehle	Austria	LW11	1:30.30	1:15.04	+2.21
4	Nick Catanzarite	United States	LW10-1	1:33.99	1:15.12	+2.29
5	Reinhold Sampl	Austria	LW12-1	1:29.38	1:15.37	+2.54
6	Taiki Morii	Japan	LW11	1:30.81	1:15.46	+2.63
7	Klaus Salzmann	Austria	LW11	1:32.03	1:16.48	+3.65
8	Fabrizio Zardini	Italy	LW11	1:32.10	1:16.53	+3.70
9	Shannon Dallas	Australia	LW11	1:33.22	1:17.46	+4.63
10	Kevin Bramble	United States	LW12-1	1:32.14	1:17.69	+4.86
11	Tyler Walker	United States	LW12-2	1:31.13	1:17.75	+4.92
12	Yohann Taberlet	France	LW12-1	1:32.47	1:17.97	+5.14
13	Juergen Egle	Austria	LW11	1:33.85	1:17.99	+5.16
14	Thomas Bechter	Austria	LW10-1	1:38.30	1:18.57	+5.74
15	Akira Taniguchi	Japan	LW11	1:34.56	1:18.58	+5.75
16	Michael Stampfer	Italy	LW10-2	1:40.52	1:20.54	+7.71
17	Christian Junghanns	Germany	LW11	1:37.16	1:20.74	+7.91
18	Vindicio Vescovi	Italy	LW11	1:37.35	1:20.90	+8.07
19	Roger Lee	United States	LW11	1:37.53	1:21.05	+8.22
20	Christoph Kunz	Switzerland	LW10-1	1:41.73	1:21.31	+8.48
21	Martin Krivos	Slovakia	LW12-2	1:35.56	1:21.53	+8.70
22	Sean Rose	Great Britain	LW11	1:38.26	1:21.65	+8.82
23	Russell Docker	Great Britain	LW12-1	1:37.20	1:21.96	+9.13
24	Jeffery Penner	Canada	LW11	1:38.98	1:22.25	+9.42
25	Bradley Lennea	Canada	LW12-1	1:37.63	1:22.32	+9.49
26	Radim Kozlovsky	Czech Republic	LW10-2	1:43.02	1:22.55	+9.72
27	Markus Pfisterer	Switzerland	LW12-1	1:38.14	1:22.75	+9.92
28	Joseph Tompkins	United States	LW11	1:40.20	1:23.27	+10.44
29	Dragan Scepanovic	Finland	LW10-1	1:44.44	1:23.48	+10.65
30	Cyril More	France	LW12-1	1:39.49	1:23.89	+11.06
31	Carl Burnett	United States	LW11	1:41.40	1:24.26	+11.43
32	Gerald Hayden	United States	LW12-1	1:40.20	1:24.49	+11.66
33	Hiroshi Nojima	Japan	LW11	1:42.78	1:25.41	+12.58
34	Peter Sutor	Slovakia	LW12-1	1:41.92	1:25.94	+13.11
-	Denis Barbet	France	LW11	DNF		
-	Christopher Devlin-Young	United States	LW12-1	DNF		
-	Junichi Hasegawa	Japan	LW10-2	DNF		
-	Emanuele Pagnini	Italy	LW12-1	DNF		
-	Scott Patterson	Canada	LW12-1	DNF		
-	Thomas von Daeniken	Switzerland	LW12-1	DNF		
-	Hans Joerg Arnold	Switzerland	LW12-1	DNS		
-	Luca Maraffio	Italy	LW12-1	DNS		
-	Takeshi Suzuki	Japan	LW12-2	DNS		

== Standing ==
The standing event took place on 13 March. It was won by Walter Lackner, representing Austria.

Rank	Name	Country	Class	Real Time	Calc Time	Difference
1st place, gold medalist(s)	Walter Lackner	Austria	LW6/8-2	1:11.87	1:11.87	
2nd place, silver medalist(s)	Gerd Schönfelder	Germany	LW5/7-2	1:12.76	1:11.89	+0.02
3rd place, bronze medalist(s)	Toby Kane	Australia	LW2	1:18.06	1:12.03	+0.16
4	Thomas Pfyl	Switzerland	LW9-2	1:18.21	1:12.25	+0.38
5	Masahiko Tokai	Japan	LW3-2	1:17.85	1:12.61	+0.74
6	Robert Meusburger	Austria	LW4	1:13.44	1:13.08	+1.21
7	Frank Pfortmueller	Germany	LW6/8-2	1:13.23	1:13.23	+1.36
8	Hans Burn	Switzerland	LW4	1:13.61	1:13.25	+1.38
9	Simon Raaflaub	Switzerland	LW2	1:19.45	1:13.31	+1.44
10	Lionel Brun	France	LW6/8-1	1:13.51	1:13.36	+1.49
11	Romain Riboud	France	LW9-2	1:19.44	1:13.39	+1.52
12	Michael Milton	Australia	LW2	1:19.77	1:13.61	+1.74
13	Christian Lanthaler	Italy	LW2	1:19.89	1:13.72	+1.85
14	Matthias Hoell	Austria	LW4	1:14.15	1:13.79	+1.92
15	Hubert Mandl	Austria	LW4	1:14.23	1:13.87	+2.00
15	Florian Planker	Italy	LW2	1:20.05	1:13.87	+2.00
17	Monte Meier	United States	LW2	1:20.39	1:14.18	+2.31
18	Asle Tangvik	Norway	LW2	1:20.51	1:14.29	+2.42
19	Fritz Berger	Switzerland	LW2	1:20.71	1:14.47	+2.60
20	Timothy Fox	United States	LW4	1:15.03	1:14.66	+2.79
21	Hiraku Misawa	Japan	LW2	1:21.05	1:14.79	+2.92
22	James Lagerstrom	United States	LW4	1:15.31	1:14.94	+3.07
22	Michael Bruegger	Switzerland	LW4	1:15.31	1:14.94	+3.07
24	George Sansonetis	United States	LW9-2	1:21.46	1:15.26	+3.39
25	Wolfgang Moosbrugger	Austria	LW6/8-2	1:15.35	1:15.35	+3.48
26	Martin France	Slovakia	LW9-1	1:31.05	1:15.55	+3.68
27	Manfred Auer	Austria	LW4	1:15.93	1:15.56	+3.69
28	Josef Schoesswendter	Austria	LW4	1:15.99	1:15.62	+3.75
29	Andreas Preiss	Austria	LW6/8-2	1:15.75	1:15.75	+3.88
30	Bradley Washburn	United States	LW4	1:16.30	1:15.93	+4.06
31	Daniil Anokhin	Russia	LW2	1:23.59	1:17.13	+5.26
32	Christopher Canfield	United States	LW2	1:23.88	1:17.40	+5.53
33	Nicholas Watts	Australia	LW4	1:18.01	1:17.63	+5.76
34	Andreas Schmid	Austria	LW2	1:24.14	1:17.64	+5.77
35	Michal Nevrkla	Czech Republic	LW2	1:24.16	1:17.66	+5.79
36	Juerg Gadient	Switzerland	LW2	1:24.19	1:17.69	+5.82
37	Matthew Hallat	Canada	LW2	1:24.65	1:18.11	+6.24
38	Bruce Warner	South Africa	LW2	1:24.89	1:18.33	+6.46
39	Stanislav Loska	Czech Republic	LW6/8-1	1:18.57	1:18.41	+6.54
40	Reed Robinson	United States	LW6/8-1	1:18.62	1:18.46	+6.59
41	Eduardo Carrera	Spain	LW6/8-2	1:18.48	1:18.48	+6.61
42	Toshihiro Abe	Japan	LW6/8-1	1:19.10	1:18.94	+7.07
43	Jan Dostal	Czech Republic	LW2	1:25.65	1:19.03	+7.16
44	Gakuta Koike	Japan	LW6/8-2	1:19.59	1:19.59	+7.72
45	Simon Voit	Germany	LW2	1:26.88	1:20.17	+8.30
46	Scott Adams	Australia	LW4	1:21.47	1:21.07	+9.20
47	Dean Calabrese	Australia	LW9-2	1:27.96	1:21.26	+9.39
48	Alexander Alyabyev	Russia	LW6/8-2	1:21.42	1:21.42	+9.55
49	Anthony James Field	New Zealand	LW6/8-1	1:21.90	1:21.74	+9.87
50	Adam Hall	New Zealand	LW1	1:40.13	1:22.00	+10.13
-	Cameron Rahles Rahbula	Australia	LW2	DNF		
-	Cedric Amafroi Broisat	France	LW4	DNF		
-	Ralph Green	United States	LW2	DNF		
-	Marty Mayberry	Australia	LW3-1	DNF		
-	Naoya Maruyama	Japan	LW4	DNF		
