= Alpine skiing at the 2006 Winter Paralympics – Men's giant slalom =

Alpine skiing - Men's giant slalom at the IX Paralympic Winter Games
- Venue: Sestriere
- Dates: 16–17 March 2006

Men's giant slalom events at the 2006 Winter Paralympics were contested at Sestriere on 16 & 17 March.

There were 3 events. Each was contested by skiers from a range of disability classes, and the standings were decided by applying a disability factor to the actual times achieved. All times shown below are calculated times, except for the final "Real Time" column.

== Visually impaired ==
The visually impaired event took place on 17 March. It was won by Nicolas Berejny, representing France.

Rank	Name	Country	Class	Run1	Run2	Result	Diff	Real Time
1st place, gold medalist(s)	Nicolas Berejny; Guide: Sophie Troc	France	B2	57.98 (1)	52.68 (1)	1:50.66		2:05.70
2nd place, silver medalist(s)	Gianmaria Dal Maistro; Guide: Tommaso Balasso	Italy	B3	58.55 (2)	54.22 (2)	1:52.77	+2.11	2:03.81
3rd place, bronze medalist(s)	Eric Villalon; Guide: Hodei Yurrita	Spain	B2	58.84 (3)	55.18 (5)	1:54.02	+3.36	2:09.52
4	Radomir Dudas; Guide: Maros Hudik	Slovakia	B2	1:01.17 (4)	54.68 (4)	1:55.85	+5.19	2:11.61
5	Norbert Holík; Guide: Martin Pavlak	Slovakia	B3	1:03.00 (6)	54.53 (3)	1:57.53	+6.87	2:09.04
6	Luigi Bertanza; Guide: Ivan Morlotti	Italy	B1	1:02.79 (5)	57.16 (6)	1:59.95	+9.29	3:28.57
7	Miroslav Haraus; Guide: Miroslav Bulovsky	Slovakia	B2	1:03.78 (7)	58.57 (7)	2:02.35	+11.69	2:18.98
8	Andrew Parr; Guide: Alexander Walker	United States	B3	1:04.90 (9)	59.11 (9)	2:04.01	+13.35	2:16.14
9	Daniel Cintula; Guide: Michal Cerven	Slovakia	B2	1:04.52 (8)	59.79 (10)	2:04.31	+13.65	2:21.22
10	Julian Hadschieff; Guide: Stefan Schoner	Austria	B2	1:06.55 (10)	59.06 (8)	2:05.61	+14.95	2:22.69
11	Marek Kubacka; Guide: Jozef Cirbus	Slovakia	B1	1:12.22 (12)	1:00.67 (11)	2:12.89	+22.23	3:51.09
12	Andres Boira; Guide: Beatriz Arceredillo	Spain	B3	1:10.36 (11)	1:03.62 (12)	2:13.98	+23.32	2:27.10
-	Junichi Fujisaku; Guide: Akihisa Ishiguro	Japan	B2	1:16.95 (13)	DSQ			
-	Gerd Gradwohl; Guide: Karl Heinz Vachenauer	Germany	B2	DNF				

== Sitting ==
The sitting event took place on 17 March. It was won by Martin Braxenthaler, representing Germany.

Rank	Name	Country	Class	Run1	Run2	Result	Diff	Real Time
1st place, gold medalist(s)	Martin Braxenthaler	Germany	LW10-2	58.19 (1)	52.64 (1)	1:50.83		2:19.44
2nd place, silver medalist(s)	Taiki Morii	Japan	LW11	58.56 (2)	53.88 (3)	1:52.44	+1.61	2:12.72
3rd place, bronze medalist(s)	Juergen Egle	Austria	LW11	59.25 (3)	53.54 (2)	1:52.79	+1.96	2:13.12
4	Christopher Devlin-Young	United States	LW12-1	59.41 (4)	55.96 (10)	1:55.37	+4.54	2:14.58
5	Harald Eder	Austria	LW11	1:01.25 (7)	54.43 (5)	1:55.68	+4.85	2:16.54
6	Tyler Walker	United States	LW12-2	1:01.08 (6)	55.10 (6)	1:56.18	+5.35	2:13.97
7	Michael Stampfer	Italy	LW10-2	1:02.48 (12)	54.38 (4)	1:56.86	+6.03	2:27.02
8	Christoph Kunz	Switzerland	LW10-1	1:01.34 (8)	55.94 (9)	1:57.28	+6.45	2:27.92
9	Thomas Bechter	Austria	LW10-1	1:02.10 (9)	55.80 (8)	1:57.90	+7.07	2:28.70
10	Klaus Salzmann	Austria	LW11	1:02.31 (11)	56.37 (12)	1:58.68	+7.85	2:20.08
11	Denis Barbet	France	LW11	1:02.98 (13)	56.54 (13)	1:59.52	+8.69	2:21.08
12	Robert Froehle	Austria	LW11	1:04.20 (17)	55.59 (7)	1:59.79	+8.96	2:21.39
13	Radim Kozlovsky	Czech Republic	LW10-2	1:03.35 (14)	57.20 (14)	2:00.55	+9.72	2:31.66
14	Junichi Hasegawa	Japan	LW10-2	1:04.72 (18)	55.96 (10)	2:00.68	+9.85	2:31.83
15	Andreas Kapfinger	Austria	LW10-1	1:03.97 (16)	59.76 (23)	2:03.73	+12.90	2:36.05
16	Thomas Von Daeniken	Switzerland	LW12-1	1:05.02 (19)	58.74 (17)	2:03.76	+12.93	2:24.37
17	Brad Lennea	Canada	LW12-1	1:05.24 (20)	59.57 (21)	2:04.81	+13.98	2:25.60
18	Shannon Dallas	Australia	LW11	1:07.90 (34)	57.32 (15)	2:05.22	+14.39	2:27.80
19	Akira Taniguchi	Japan	LW11	1:07.06 (29)	58.21 (16)	2:05.27	+14.44	2:27.86
20	Gerald Hayden	United States	LW12-1	1:06.59 (26)	59.51 (20)	2:06.10	+15.27	2:27.10
21	Christian Junghanns	Germany	LW11	1:06.91 (28)	59.36 (19)	2:06.27	+15.44	2:29.03
22	Carl Burnett	United States	LW11	1:07.65 (32)	59.20 (18)	2:06.85	+16.02	2:29.73
23	Roger Lee	United States	LW11	1:07.27 (30)	59.77 (24)	2:07.04	+16.21	2:29.95
24	Vindicio Vescovi	Italy	LW11	1:05.88 (23)	1:01.28 (28)	2:07.16	+16.33	2:30.09
25	John Knudsen	United States	LW12-2	1:06.42 (25)	1:01.14 (27)	2:07.56	+16.73	2:27.09
26	Markus Pfisterer	Switzerland	LW12-1	1:07.45 (31)	1:00.45 (25)	2:07.90	+17.07	2:29.20
27	Jaroslaw Rola	Poland	LW12-2	1:07.88 (33)	1:00.51 (26)	2:08.39	+17.56	2:28.05
28	Martin Krivos	Slovakia	LW12-2	1:08.79 (36)	59.70 (22)	2:08.49	+17.66	2:28.16
29	Russell Docker	Great Britain	LW12-1	1:08.54 (35)	1:01.35 (29)	2:09.89	+19.06	2:31.53
30	Alexander Wechselberger	Austria	LW11	1:06.29 (24)	1:03.70 (33)	2:09.99	+19.16	2:33.43
31	Dragan Scepanovic	Finland	LW10-1	1:09.22 (38)	1:02.35 (30)	2:11.57	+20.74	2:45.94
32	Jeffery Penner	Canada	LW11	1:10.73 (39)	1:02.57 (31)	2:13.30	+22.47	2:37.33
33	Erik Bayindirli	United States	LW11	1:11.98 (40)	1:03.87 (34)	2:15.85	+25.02	2:40.35
34	Nick Catanzarite	United States	LW10-1	1:03.73 (15)	1:12.62 (38)	2:16.35	+25.52	2:51.97
35	Peter Sutor	Slovakia	LW12-1	1:12.18 (41)	1:06.58 (37)	2:18.76	+27.93	2:41.87
36	Park Jong Serk	South Korea	LW11	1:13.78 (43)	1:05.91 (36)	2:19.69	+28.86	2:44.88
37	Joseph Tompkins	United States	LW11	1:14.75 (44)	1:05.41 (35)	2:20.16	+29.33	2:45.43
38	Tomas Del Villar	Chile	LW10-2	1:22.90 (47)	1:03.17 (32)	2:26.07	+35.24	3:03.77
39	Sandor Navratyil	Hungary	LW11	1:27.68 (49)	1:18.93 (39)	2:46.61	+55.78	3:16.65
40	Xavier Barios	Andorra	LW10-1	1:27.67 (48)	1:20.94 (40)	2:48.61	+57.78	3:32.67
41	Armando Ruiz	Mexico	LW11	2:56.68 (50)	2:46.77 (41)	5:43.45	+52.62	6:45.38
-	Takeshi Suzuki	Japan	LW12-2	1:01.00 (5)	DNF			
-	Jean Yves Le Meur	France	LW12-2	1:02.23 (10)	DSQ			
-	Hans Joerg Arnold	Switzerland	LW12-1	1:05.26 (21)	DNS			
-	Fabrizio Zardini	Italy	LW11	1:05.78 (22)	DNS			
-	Sean Rose	Great Britain	LW11	1:06.89 (27)	DNF			
-	Han Sang Min	South Korea	LW12-1	1:08.91 (37)	DSQ			
-	Lee Hwan Kyung	South Korea	LW12-2	1:12.21 (42)	DSQ			
-	Cyril More	France	LW12-1	1:14.90 (45)	DSQ			
-	Akira Kano	Japan	LW11	1:16.13 (46)	DSQ			
-	Reini Sampl	Austria	LW12-1	DNF				
-	Scott Patterson	Canada	LW12-2	DNF				
-	Emanuele Pagnini	Italy	LW12-1	DNF				
-	Kevin Lindner	Germany	LW12-1	DNF				
-	Ziga Breznik	Slovenia	LW10-1	DNF				
-	Hiroshi Nojima	Japan	LW11	DNF				
-	Yohann Taberlet	France	LW12-1	DSQ				
-	Luca Maraffio	Italy	LW12-1	DNS				

== Standing ==
The standing event took place on 16 March. It was won by Gerd Schönfelder, representing Germany.

Rank	Name	Country	Class	Run1	Run2	Result	Diff	Real Time
1st place, gold medalist(s)	Gerd Schönfelder	Germany	LW5/7-2	57.12 (1)	51.49 (7)	1:48.61		1:50.45
2nd place, silver medalist(s)	Masahiko Tokai	Japan	LW3-2	59.50 (3)	50.43 (2)	1:49.93	+1.32	1:57.64
3rd place, bronze medalist(s)	Thomas Pfyl	Switzerland	LW9-2	1:00.16 (5)	50.66 (3)	1:50.82	+2.21	1:59.29
4	Martin France	Slovakia	LW9-1	1:00.44 (7)	50.41 (1)	1:50.85	+2.24	2:16.10
5	Robert Meusburger	Austria	LW4	59.67 (4)	51.22 (6)	1:50.89	+2.28	1:51.70
6	Hans Burn	Switzerland	LW4	1:00.63 (9)	50.74 (4)	1:51.37	+2.76	1:52.18
7	Walter Lackner	Austria	LW6/8-2	1:00.55 (8)	50.92 (5)	1:51.47	+2.86	1:51.47
8	Timothy Fox	United States	LW4	59.21 (2)	52.61 (13)	1:51.82	+3.21	1:52.63
9	Frank Pfortmueller	Germany	LW6/8-2	1:00.35 (6)	52.20 (10)	1:52.55	+3.94	1:52.55
10	Hiraku Misawa	Japan	LW2	1:00.99 (10)	51.82 (8)	1:52.81	+4.20	2:02.83
11	Romain Riboud	France	LW9-2	1:02.09 (16)	52.36 (11)	1:54.45	+5.84	2:03.20
12	Lionel Brun	France	LW6/8-1	1:02.00 (15)	52.51 (12)	1:54.51	+5.90	1:54.74
13	Michael Milton	Australia	LW2	1:02.81 (19)	51.93 (9)	1:54.74	+6.13	2:04.93
14	Wolfgang Moosbrugger	Austria	LW6/8-2	1:01.60 (14)	53.71 (14)	1:55.31	+6.70	1:55.31
15	Bradley Washburn	United States	LW4	1:01.53 (13)	54.07 (16)	1:55.60	+6.99	1:56.45
16	Stanislav Loska	Czech Republic	LW6/8-1	1:01.16 (11)	56.70 (28)	1:57.86	+9.25	1:58.09
17	Josef Schoesswendter	Austria	LW4	1:03.92 (23)	54.34 (17)	1:58.26	+9.65	1:59.13
18	George Sansonetis	United States	LW9-2	1:03.38 (20)	54.96 (21)	1:58.34	+9.73	2:07.39
19	Gakuta Koike	Japan	LW6/8-2	1:03.93 (24)	54.60 (19)	1:58.53	+9.92	1:58.53
20	James Lagerstrom	United States	LW4	1:05.03 (29)	53.71 (14)	1:58.74	+10.13	1:59.61
21	Marty Mayberry	Australia	LW3-1	1:04.52 (26)	54.62 (20)	1:59.14	+10.53	2:08.47
22	Alexander Alyabyev	Russia	LW6/8-2	1:03.61 (21)	55.70 (24)	1:59.31	+10.70	1:59.31
23	Hubert Mandl	Austria	LW4	1:01.21 (12)	58.16 (35)	1:59.37	+10.76	2:00.24
24	Reed Robinson	United States	LW6/8-1	1:03.76 (22)	55.70 (24)	1:59.46	+10.85	1:59.70
25	Simon Raaflaub	Switzerland	LW2	1:05.61 (31)	54.34 (17)	1:59.95	+11.34	2:10.61
26	Martin Falch	Austria	LW4	1:04.64 (27)	55.61 (23)	2:00.25	+11.64	2:01.13
27	Nicholas Watts	Australia	LW4	1:06.09 (34)	56.81 (29)	2:02.90	+14.29	2:03.79
28	Robert Durcan	Slovakia	LW6/8-2	1:06.02 (33)	57.08 (30)	2:03.10	+14.49	2:03.10
29	Juerg Gadient	Switzerland	LW2	1:07.38 (35)	56.09 (27)	2:03.47	+14.86	2:14.43
30	Naoya Maruyama	Japan	LW4	1:05.65 (32)	58.06 (34)	2:03.71	+15.10	2:04.61
31	Christopher Canfield	United States	LW2	1:08.13 (37)	56.02 (26)	2:04.15	+15.54	2:15.17
32	Matthew Hallat	Canada	LW2	1:11.46 (43)	55.17 (22)	2:06.63	+18.02	2:17.88
33	Michal Nevrkla	Czech Republic	LW2	1:08.83 (38)	58.22 (36)	2:07.05	+18.44	2:18.33
34	Dean Calabrese	Australia	LW9-2	1:09.59 (39)	57.98 (33)	2:07.57	+18.96	2:17.32
35	Anthony James Field	New Zealand	LW6/8-1	1:09.69 (41)	57.96 (32)	2:07.65	+19.04	2:07.91
36	Jan Dostal	Czech Republic	LW2	1:09.64 (40)	1:00.22 (40)	2:09.86	+21.25	2:21.39
37	Asle Tangvik	Norway	LW2	1:13.48 (49)	57.23 (31)	2:10.71	+22.10	2:22.32
38	Sadegh Kalhor	Iran	LW2	1:12.18 (45)	59.06 (37)	2:11.24	+22.63	2:22.90
39	Bogdan Mirski	Poland	LW6/8-2	1:11.84 (44)	1:01.40 (43)	2:13.24	+24.63	2:13.24
40	Scott Adams	Australia	LW4	1:13.40 (47)	1:00.06 (39)	2:13.46	+24.85	2:14.44
41	Ugo Bregant	Italy	LW2	1:13.62 (50)	1:00.85 (41)	2:14.47	+25.86	2:26.41
42	Simon Voit	Germany	LW2	1:15.72 (55)	59.31 (38)	2:15.03	+26.42	2:27.02
43	Adam Hall	New Zealand	LW1	1:13.40 (47)	1:02.09 (44)	2:15.49	+26.88	2:43.86
44	Joshua Sundquist	United States	LW2	1:14.77 (52)	1:01.29 (42)	2:16.06	+27.45	2:28.14
45	Bruce Warner	South Africa	LW2	1:10.54 (42)	1:08.85 (49)	2:19.39	+30.78	2:31.76
46	Ralph Green	United States	LW2	1:14.15 (51)	1:06.71 (47)	2:20.86	+32.25	2:33.36
47	Zlatko Pesjak	Croatia	LW6/8-2	1:15.71 (54)	1:06.88 (48)	2:22.59	+33.98	2:22.59
48	Mher Avanesyan	Armenia	LW5/7-1	1:17.02 (56)	1:06.68 (46)	2:23.70	+35.09	2:26.43
49	Lukasz Szeliga	Poland	LW2	1:17.41 (57)	1:06.31 (45)	2:23.72	+35.11	2:36.48
50	Ramon Homs	Spain	LW6/8-1	1:13.23 (46)	1:11.84 (50)	2:25.07	+36.46	2:25.36
51	Maris Nimrods	Latvia	LW6/8-2	1:23.85 (58)	1:13.65 (51)	2:37.50	+48.89	2:37.50
-	Cameron Rahles Rahbula	Australia	LW2	1:02.21 (17)	DNF			
-	Andreas Preiss	Austria	LW6/8-2	1:02.62 (18)	DNF			
-	Michael Bruegger	Switzerland	LW4	1:04.10 (25)	DNF			
-	Fritz Berger	Switzerland	LW2	1:04.69 (28)	DNF			
-	Monte Meier	United States	LW2	1:05.39 (30)	DNF			
-	Christian Lanthaler	Italy	LW2	1:07.46 (36)	DNF			
-	Alexey Moshkin	Russia	LW3-1	1:15.44 (53)	DNS			
-	Matthias Hoell	Austria	LW4	DNF				
-	Toby Kane	Australia	LW2	DNF				
-	Toshihiro Abe	Japan	LW6/8-1	DNF				
-	Florian Planker	Italy	LW2	DNF				
-	Daniil Anokhin	Russia	LW2	DNF				
-	Jorge Migueles	Chile	LW2	DNF				
-	Cedric Amafroi Broisat	France	LW4	DNS				
-	Eduardo Carrera	Spain	LW6/8-2	DNS				
