= Alpine skiing at the 2006 Winter Paralympics – Men's slalom =

Alpine skiing - Men's slalom at the IX Paralympic Winter Games
- Venue: Sestriere
- Dates: 18–19 March 2006

The Men's slalom events of the 2006 Winter Paralympics took place March 18—19, 2006, at Sestriere.

There were 3 events. Each was contested by skiers from a range of disability classes, and the standings were decided by applying a disability factor to the actual times achieved. All times shown below are calculated times, except for the final "Real Time" column.

== Visually impaired ==
The visually impaired event took place on 19 March. It was won by Nicolas Berejny, representing France.

Rank	Name	Country	Class	Run1	Run2	Result	Diff	Real Time
1st place, gold medalist(s)	Nicolas Berejny; Guide: Sophie Troc	France	B2	45.36 (1)	41.48 (2)	1:26.84		1:48.60
2nd place, silver medalist(s)	Eric Villalon; Guide: Hodei Yurrita	Spain	B2	46.11 (4)	41.05 (1)	1:27.16	+0.32	1:49.00
3rd place, bronze medalist(s)	Gerd Gradwohl; Guide: Karl Heinz Vachenauer	Germany	B2	45.78 (2)	41.48 (2)	1:27.26	+0.42	1:49.12
4	Radomir Dudas; Guide: Maros Hudik	Slovakia	B2	45.84 (3)	42.13 (4)	1:27.97	+1.13	1:50.02
5	Norbert Holík; Guide: Martin Pavlak	Slovakia	B3	47.82 (6)	42.18 (5)	1:30.00	+3.16	1:46.93
6	Daniel Cintula; Guide: Michal Cerven	Slovakia	B2	47.51 (5)	43.56 (7)	1:31.07	+4.23	1:53.90
7	Jon Santacana; Guide: Miguel Galindo	Spain	B2	49.03 (9)	42.49 (6)	1:31.52	+4.68	1:54.46
8	Miroslav Haraus; Guide: Miroslav Bulovsky	Slovakia	B2	48.64 (7)	45.55 (9)	1:34.19	+7.35	1:57.79
9	Andrew Parr; Guide: Alexander Walker	United States	B3	50.42 (10)	44.41 (8)	1:34.83	+7.99	1:52.66
10	Andres Boira; Guide: Beatriz Arceredillo	Spain	B3	54.58 (11)	50.21 (10)	1:44.79	+17.95	2:04.51
11	Junichi Fujisaku; Guide: Akihisa Ishiguro	Japan	B2	59.51 (12)	55.18 (11)	1:54.69	+27.85	2:23.43
-	Julian Hadschieff; Guide: Stefan Schoner	Austria	B2	DNF				
-	Gianmaria Dal Maistro; Guide: Tommaso Balasso	Italy	B3	DNF				

== Sitting ==
The sitting event took place on 19 March. It was won by Martin Braxenthaler, representing Germany.

Rank	Name	Country	Class	Run1	Run2	Result	Diff	Real Time
1st place, gold medalist(s)	Martin Braxenthaler	Germany	LW10-2	43.74 (1)	39.45 (1)	1:23.19		1:58.66
2nd place, silver medalist(s)	Harald Eder	Austria	LW11	45.10 (2)	41.68 (4)	1:26.78	+3.59	1:53.58
3rd place, bronze medalist(s)	Juergen Egle	Austria	LW11	47.24 (4)	41.15 (2)	1:28.39	+5.20	1:55.69
4	Taiki Morii	Japan	LW11	47.08 (3)	41.60 (3)	1:28.68	+5.49	1:56.06
5	Denis Barbet	France	LW11	48.71 (6)	42.76 (5)	1:31.47	+8.28	1:59.71
6	Andreas Kapfinger	Austria	LW10-1	48.50 (5)	43.04 (8)	1:31.54	+8.35	2:10.95
7	Reini Sampl	Austria	LW12-1	49.82 (8)	42.91 (6)	1:32.73	+9.54	1:58.36
8	Christopher Devlin-Young	United States	LW12-1	50.10 (10)	43.26 (9)	1:33.36	+10.17	1:59.17
9	Jean Yves Le Meur	France	LW12-2	50.94 (14)	43.61 (10)	1:34.55	+11.36	1:59.07
10	Jaroslaw Rola	Poland	LW12-2	49.88 (9)	44.69 (13)	1:34.57	+11.38	1:59.09
11	Akira Taniguchi	Japan	LW11	50.94 (14)	43.80 (11)	1:34.74	+11.55	2:03.99
12	Takeshi Suzuki	Japan	LW12-2	52.12 (17)	43.01 (7)	1:35.13	+11.94	1:59.79
13	Cyril More	France	LW12-1	50.86 (13)	44.44 (12)	1:35.30	+12.11	2:01.64
14	Tyler Walker	United States	LW12-2	49.61 (7)	45.88 (16)	1:35.49	+12.30	2:00.26
15	Robert Froehle	Austria	LW11	50.51 (11)	45.07 (14)	1:35.58	+12.39	2:05.09
16	Carl Burnett	United States	LW11	51.06 (16)	45.92 (18)	1:36.98	+13.79	2:06.93
17	Martin Krivos	Slovakia	LW12-2	52.55 (21)	45.75 (15)	1:38.30	+15.11	2:03.80
17	Roger Lee	United States	LW11	52.39 (19)	45.91 (17)	1:38.30	+15.11	2:08.66
19	Gerald Hayden	United States	LW12-1	52.44 (20)	46.53 (20)	1:38.97	+15.78	2:06.32
20	Christoph Kunz	Switzerland	LW10-1	54.31 (24)	46.13 (19)	1:40.44	+17.25	2:23.68
21	Sean Rose	Great Britain	LW11	54.04 (23)	49.88 (25)	1:43.92	+20.73	2:16.00
22	Dragan Scepanovic	Finland	LW10-1	57.20 (27)	48.67 (23)	1:45.87	+22.68	2:31.46
23	Christian Junghanns	Germany	LW11	56.55 (26)	49.49 (24)	1:46.04	+22.85	2:18.78
24	Han Sang Min	South Korea	LW12-1	58.83 (31)	47.26 (21)	1:46.09	+22.90	2:15.41
25	Brad Lennea	Canada	LW12-1	59.07 (32)	50.70 (26)	1:49.77	+26.58	2:20.12
26	Markus Pfisterer	Switzerland	LW12-1	58.18 (28)	51.79 (27)	1:49.97	+26.78	2:20.37
27	Akira Kano	Japan	LW11	1:01.93 (34)	48.08 (22)	1:50.01	+26.82	2:23.98
28	Tomas Del Villar	Chile	LW10-2	1:01.55 (33)	53.07 (29)	1:54.62	+31.43	2:43.50
29	Sandor Navratyil	Hungary	LW11	1:08.13 (36)	55.84 (31)	2:03.97	+40.78	2:42.24
30	Park Jong Serk	South Korea	LW11	1:13.47 (37)	55.34 (30)	2:08.81	+45.62	2:48.59
31	Scott Patterson	Canada	LW12-2	1:18.57 (38)	51.86 (28)	2:10.43	+47.24	2:44.25
32	Lee Hwan Kyung	South Korea	LW12-2	1:03.72 (35)	1:07.28 (32)	2:11.00	+47.81	2:44.98
-	Vindicio Vescovi	Italy	LW11	50.61 (12)	DNF			
-	Hans Joerg Arnold	Switzerland	LW12-1	52.32 (18)	DNS			
-	Thomas Von Daeniken	Switzerland	LW12-1	53.46 (22)	DNS			
-	Radim Kozlovsky	Czech Republic	LW10-2	55.65 (25)	DNF			
-	Hiroshi Nojima	Japan	LW11	58.54 (29)	DNF			
-	Peter Sutor	Slovakia	LW12-1	58.57 (30)	DNF			
-	Yohann Taberlet	France	LW12-1	DNF				
-	Klaus Salzmann	Austria	LW11	DNF				
-	Junichi Hasegawa	Japan	LW10-2	DNF				
-	Nick Catanzarite	United States	LW10-1	DNF				
-	Kevin Lindner	Germany	LW12-1	DNF				
-	Jeffery Penner	Canada	LW11	DNF				
-	Armando Ruiz	Mexico	LW11	DNF				
-	Xavier Barios	Andorra	LW10-1	DNF				
-	Alexander Wechselberger	Austria	LW11	DNS				
-	Russell Docker	Great Britain	LW12-1	DNS				

== Standing ==
The standing event took place on 18 March. It was won by Robert Meusburger, representing Austria.

Rank	Name	Country	Class	Run1	Run2	Result	Diff	Real Time
1st place, gold medalist(s)	Robert Meusburger	Austria	LW4	42.86 (2)	39.15 (4)	1:22.01		1:22.81
2nd place, silver medalist(s)	Thomas Pfyl	Switzerland	LW9-2	42.81 (1)	39.49 (8)	1:22.30	+0.29	1:32.24
3rd place, bronze medalist(s)	Gerd Schönfelder	Germany	LW5/7-2	43.44 (4)	39.10 (3)	1:22.54	+0.53	1:23.66
4	Masahiko Tokai	Japan	LW3-2	43.11 (3)	39.85 (9)	1:22.96	+0.95	1:33.49
5	Simon Raaflaub	Switzerland	LW2	44.18 (8)	39.02 (2)	1:23.20	+1.19	1:23.20
5	Hiraku Misawa	Japan	LW2	44.02 (7)	39.18 (5)	1:23.20	+1.19	1:23.20
7	Martin France	Slovakia	LW9-1	43.75 (6)	39.97 (11)	1:23.72	+1.71	1:43.38
8	Monte Meier	United States	LW2	45.72 (16)	38.31 (1)	1:24.03	+2.02	1:24.03
9	Michael Milton	Australia	LW2	44.88 (10)	39.32 (6)	1:24.20	+2.19	1:24.20
10	Bradley Washburn	United States	LW4	44.89 (11)	40.10 (12)	1:24.99	+2.98	1:25.81
11	Hubert Mandl	Austria	LW4	45.15 (14)	39.95 (10)	1:25.10	+3.09	1:25.93
12	Michael Bruegger	Switzerland	LW4	45.86 (18)	39.32 (6)	1:25.18	+3.17	1:26.00
13	Wolfgang Moosbrugger	Austria	LW6/8-2	44.97 (12)	40.83 (14)	1:25.80	+3.79	1:26.58
14	Cameron Rahles Rahbula	Australia	LW2	44.65 (9)	41.22 (17)	1:25.87	+3.86	1:25.87
15	Lionel Brun	France	LW6/8-1	45.38 (15)	40.72 (13)	1:26.10	+4.09	1:27.05
16	Toby Kane	Australia	LW2	46.05 (22)	41.05 (16)	1:27.10	+5.09	1:27.10
17	Martin Falch	Austria	LW4	46.39 (23)	40.91 (15)	1:27.30	+5.29	1:28.15
18	Stanislav Loska	Czech Republic	LW6/8-1	46.05 (21)	41.43 (18)	1:27.48	+5.47	1:28.45
19	Marty Mayberry	Australia	LW3-1	45.99 (19)	41.77 (20)	1:27.76	+5.75	1:39.88
20	Manfred Auer	Austria	LW4	46.68 (25)	41.54 (19)	1:28.22	+6.21	1:29.07
21	Romain Riboud	France	LW9-2	46.39 (23)	42.47 (24)	1:28.86	+6.85	1:39.59
22	Josef Schoesswendter	Austria	LW4	47.21 (28)	42.23 (21)	1:29.44	+7.43	1:30.31
23	James Lagerstrom	United States	LW4	48.17 (30)	42.44 (23)	1:30.61	+8.60	1:31.49
24	Fritz Berger	Switzerland	LW2	48.54 (33)	42.42 (22)	1:30.96	+8.95	1:30.96
25	Frank Pfortmueller	Germany	LW6/8-2	47.99 (29)	43.04 (26)	1:31.03	+9.02	1:31.86
26	Michal Nevrkla	Czech Republic	LW2	48.23 (31)	43.01 (25)	1:31.24	+9.23	1:31.24
27	Bruce Warner	South Africa	LW2	49.48 (37)	43.81 (27)	1:33.29	+11.28	1:33.29
28	Reed Robinson	United States	LW6/8-1	49.29 (36)	44.34 (28)	1:33.63	+11.62	1:34.67
29	Jan Dostal	Czech Republic	LW2	49.20 (35)	44.58 (29)	1:33.78	+11.77	1:33.78
30	Nicholas Watts	Australia	LW4	49.02 (34)	45.20 (30)	1:34.22	+12.21	1:35.13
31	Matthew Hallat	Canada	LW2	48.52 (32)	48.18 (36)	1:36.70	+14.69	1:36.70
32	Alexey Moshkin	Russia	LW3-1	51.17 (40)	45.99 (31)	1:37.16	+15.15	1:50.59
33	Anthony James Field	New Zealand	LW6/8-1	52.09 (42)	48.00 (35)	1:40.09	+18.08	1:41.20
34	Joshua Sundquist	United States	LW2	52.88 (46)	47.38 (34)	1:40.26	+18.25	1:40.26
35	Ugo Bregant	Italy	LW2	53.29 (48)	47.32 (33)	1:40.61	+18.60	1:40.61
36	Ralph Green	United States	LW2	52.29 (44)	48.64 (39)	1:40.93	+18.92	1:40.93
37	Dean Calabrese	Australia	LW9-2	52.66 (45)	48.44 (38)	1:41.10	+19.09	1:53.30
38	Scott Adams	Australia	LW4	52.94 (47)	48.23 (37)	1:41.17	+19.16	1:42.15
39	Sadegh Kalhor	Iran	LW2	54.99 (49)	46.75 (32)	1:41.74	+19.73	1:41.74
40	Bogdan Mirski	Poland	LW6/8-2	55.10 (50)	50.79 (40)	1:45.89	+23.88	1:46.85
41	Florian Planker	Italy	LW2	52.20 (43)	1:01.44 (42)	1:53.64	+31.63	1:53.64
42	Maris Nimrods	Latvia	LW6/8-2	1:05.65 (52)	58.91 (41)	2:04.56	+42.55	2:05.69
43	Jorge Migueles	Chile	LW2	1:22.82 (53)	1:09.02 (43)	2:31.84	+9.83	2:31.84
-	Hans Burn	Switzerland	LW4	43.60 (5)	DNF			
-	Cedric Amafroi Broisat	France	LW4	45.82 (17)	DNF			
-	Walter Lackner	Austria	LW6/8-2	44.97 (13)	DNF			
-	Andreas Preiss	Austria	LW6/8-2	45.99 (19)	DNF			
-	Robert Durcan	Slovakia	LW6/8-2	46.85 (26)	DNF			
-	Alexander Alyabyev	Russia	LW6/8-2	47.16 (27)	DNF			
-	Christopher Canfield	United States	LW2	49.88 (38)	DSQ			
-	Adam Hall	New Zealand	LW1	50.60 (39)	DNF			
-	Daniil Anokhin	Russia	LW2	51.28 (41)	DNF			
-	Lukasz Szeliga	Poland	LW2	56.30 (51)	DNF			
-	Shinji Inoue	Japan	LW6/8-2	DNS				
-	Timothy Fox	United States	LW4	DNF				
-	George Sansonetis	United States	LW9-2	DNF				
-	Toshihiro Abe	Japan	LW6/8-1	DNF				
-	Naoya Maruyama	Japan	LW4	DNF				
-	Gakuta Koike	Japan	LW6/8-2	DNF				
-	Zlatko Pesjak	Croatia	LW6/8-2	DNF				
-	Juerg Gadient	Switzerland	LW2	DSQ				
-	Simon Voit	Germany	LW2	DSQ				
-	Ramon Homs	Spain	LW6/8-1	DSQ				
-	Mher Avanesyan	Armenia	LW5/7-1	DSQ				
