= Alpine skiing at the 2006 Winter Paralympics – Men's downhill =

Alpine skiing - Men's downhill at the IX Paralympic Winter Games
- Venue: Sestriere

Men's downhill skiing events at the 2006 Winter Paralympics were contested at Sestriere on 11 & 12 March.

There were 3 events. Each was contested by skiers from a range of disability classes, and the standings were decided by applying a disability factor to the actual times achieved.

== Visually impaired ==
The visually impaired event took place on 12 March. It was won by Gerd Gradwohl, representing Germany.

Rank	Name	Country	Class	Real Time	Calc Time	Difference
1st place, gold medalist(s)	Gerd Gradwohl; Guide: Karl Heinz Vachenauer	Germany	B2	1:30.12	1:17.22	
2nd place, silver medalist(s)	Chris Williamson; Guide: Robert Taylor	Canada	B3	1:26.89	1:17.99	+0.77
3rd place, bronze medalist(s)	Nicolas Berejny; Guide: Sophie Troc	France	B2	1:31.49	1:18.39	+1.17
4	Radomir Dudas; Guide: Maros Hudik	Slovakia	B2	1:32.48	1:19.24	+2.02
5	Gianmaria Dal Maistro; Guide: Tommaso Balasso	Italy	B3	1:31.56	1:22.19	+4.97
6	Eric Villalon; Guide: Hodei Yurrita	Spain	B2	1:37.04	1:23.15	+5.93
7	Daniel Cintula; Guide: Michal Cerven	Slovakia	B2	1:40.27	1:25.92	+8.70
8	Miroslav Haraus; Guide: Miroslav Bulovsky	Slovakia	B2	1:41.06	1:26.60	+9.38
-	Luigi Bertanza; Guide: Ivan Morlotti	Italy	B1	DSQ		

== Sitting ==
The sitting event took place on 12 March. It was won by Kevin Bramble, representing United States.

Rank	Name	Country	Class	Real Time	Calc Time	Difference
1st place, gold medalist(s)	Kevin Bramble	United States	LW12-1	1:36.26	1:21.03	
2nd place, silver medalist(s)	Christopher Devlin-Young	United States	LW12-1	1:37.46	1:22.04	+1.01
3rd place, bronze medalist(s)	Denis Barbet	France	LW11	1:39.35	1:22.20	+1.17
4	Takeshi Suzuki	Japan	LW12-2	1:36.61	1:22.29	+1.26
5	Carl Burnett	United States	LW11	1:39.68	1:22.48	+1.45
6	Sean Rose	Great Britain	LW11	1:39.96	1:22.71	+1.68
7	Harald Eder	Austria	LW11	1:40.50	1:23.16	+2.13
8	Fabrizio Zardini	Italy	LW11	1:40.76	1:23.37	+2.34
9	Taiki Morii	Japan	LW11	1:41.24	1:23.77	+2.74
10	Thomas Von Daeniken	Switzerland	LW12-1	1:40.42	1:24.54	+3.51
11	Brad Lennea	Canada	LW12-1	1:40.76	1:24.82	+3.79
12	Martin Braxenthaler	Germany	LW10-2	1:44.97	1:25.13	+4.10
13	Robert Froehle	Austria	LW11	1:42.94	1:25.17	+4.14
14	Akira Taniguchi	Japan	LW11	1:43.07	1:25.28	+4.25
15	Tyler Walker	United States	LW12-2	1:40.71	1:25.79	+4.76
16	Christian Junghanns	Germany	LW11	1:43.93	1:25.99	+4.96
17	Martin Krivos	Slovakia	LW12-2	1:41.51	1:26.47	+5.44
18	Cyril More	France	LW12-1	1:44.12	1:27.65	+6.62
19	Dragan Scepanovic	Finland	LW10-1	1:54.08	1:32.40	+11.37
20	Scott Patterson	Canada	LW12-2	1:49.00	1:32.85	+11.82
-	Roger Lee	United States	LW11	DNS		
-	Gerald Hayden	United States	LW12-1	DNS		
-	Shannon Dallas	Australia	LW11	DNF		
-	Joseph Tompkins	United States	LW11	DNF		
-	Russell Docker	Great Britain	LW12-1	DNF		
-	Yohann Taberlet	France	LW12-1	DNF		
-	Emanuele Pagnini	Italy	LW12-1	DNF		
-	Hiroshi Nojima	Japan	LW11	DNF		
-	Nick Catanzarite	United States	LW10-1	DNF		
-	Jeffery Penner	Canada	LW11	DNF		
-	Reini Sampl	Austria	LW12-1	DNF		

== Standing ==
The standing event took place on 11 March. It was won by Gerd Schönfelder, representing Germany.

Rank	Name	Country	Class	Real Time	Calc Time	Difference
1st place, gold medalist(s)	Gerd Schönfelder	Germany	LW5/7-2	1:19.86	1:18.49	
2nd place, silver medalist(s)	Michael Milton	Australia	LW2	1:24.40	1:19.86	+1.37
3rd place, bronze medalist(s)	Walter Lackner	Austria	LW6/8-2	1:20.19	1:20.19	+1.70
4	Hans Burn	Switzerland	LW4	1:20.54	1:20.34	+1.85
5	Manfred Auer	Austria	LW4	1:22.66	1:22.45	+3.96
6	James Lagerstrom	United States	LW4	1:22.70	1:22.49	+4.00
7	Masahiko Tokai	Japan	LW3-2	1:27.72	1:22.68	+4.19
8	Thomas Pfyl	Switzerland	LW9-2	1:26.86	1:22.80	+4.31
9	Toby Kane	Australia	LW2	1:27.92	1:23.20	+4.71
10	Robert Meusburger	Austria	LW4	1:23.50	1:23.29	+4.80
11	Frank Pfortmueller	Germany	LW6/8-2	1:23.43	1:23.43	+4.94
12	Lionel Brun	France	LW6/8-1	1:23.72	1:23.55	+5.06
13	Michael Bruegger	Switzerland	LW4	1:23.83	1:23.62	+5.13
14	Hubert Mandl	Austria	LW4	1:24.11	1:23.90	+5.41
15	Cedric Amafroi Broisat	France	LW4	1:24.25	1:24.04	+5.55
16	Simon Raaflaub	Switzerland	LW2	1:28.83	1:24.06	+5.57
17	Monte Meier	United States	LW2	1:29.10	1:24.31	+5.82
18	Fritz Berger	Switzerland	LW2	1:29.47	1:24.66	+6.17
19	Wolfgang Moosbrugger	Austria	LW6/8-2	1:24.83	1:24.83	+6.34
19	Christian Lanthaler	Italy	LW2	1:29.65	1:24.83	+6.34
21	Bradley Washburn	United States	LW4	1:25.26	1:25.05	+6.56
22	Josef Schoesswendter	Austria	LW4	1:25.27	1:25.06	+6.57
23	Matthias Hoell	Austria	LW4	1:25.47	1:25.26	+6.77
24	Romain Riboud	France	LW9-2	1:29.97	1:25.77	+7.28
25	Asle Tangvik	Norway	LW2	1:31.00	1:26.11	+7.62
26	George Sansonetis	United States	LW9-2	1:30.37	1:26.15	+7.66
27	Florian Planker	Italy	LW2	1:31.77	1:26.84	+8.35
28	Andreas Preiss	Austria	LW6/8-2	1:27.22	1:27.22	+8.73
29	Reed Robinson	United States	LW6/8-1	1:27.51	1:27.33	+8.84
30	Hiraku Misawa	Japan	LW2	1:32.33	1:27.37	+8.88
31	Nicholas Watts	Australia	LW4	1:27.89	1:27.67	+9.18
32	Juerg Gadient	Switzerland	LW2	1:32.67	1:27.69	+9.20
33	Marty Mayberry	Australia	LW3-1	1:33.96	1:27.94	+9.45
34	Eduardo Carrera	Spain	LW6/8-2	1:29.48	1:29.48	+10.99
35	Naoya Maruyama	Japan	LW4	1:29.81	1:29.58	+11.09
36	Bruce Warner	South Africa	LW2	1:36.36	1:31.18	+12.69
37	Jan Dostal	Czech Republic	LW2	1:36.41	1:31.23	+12.74
37	Gakuta Koike	Japan	LW6/8-2	1:31.23	1:31.23	+12.74
39	Michal Nevrkla	Czech Republic	LW2	1:36.48	1:31.30	+12.81
40	Scott Adams	Australia	LW4	1:32.40	1:32.17	+13.68
41	Adam Hall	New Zealand	LW1	1:47.05	1:32.20	+13.71
42	Andreas Schmid	Austria	LW2	1:38.36	1:33.07	+14.58
43	Anthony James Field	New Zealand	LW6/8-1	1:34.85	1:34.66	+16.17
44	Dean Calabrese	Australia	LW9-2	1:40.23	1:35.55	+17.06
-	Cameron Rahles Rahbula	Australia	LW2	DNF		
-	Matthew Hallat	Canada	LW2	DNF		
-	Ralph Green	United States	LW2	DNF		
-	Simon Voit	Germany	LW2	DNF		
-	Daniil Anokhin	Russia	LW2	DNF		
