= 2007 IPC Alpine Skiing World Cup =

The 2007 edition of the IPC Alpine Skiing World Cup was held from January to March 2007. It was the eighth season of official World Cup competition in alpine skiing where athletes with a disability compete.

== Calendar ==
| Date | Place | Discipline | Women's winners | Men's winners |
|---|---|---|---|---|
| January 17, 2007 | Aspen, Colo. United States | SG 1 | (Austria) Sabine Gasteiger (VI) (United States) Laurie Stephens (sit) (Canada) Lauren Woolstencroft (stand) | (Canada) Chris Williamson (VI) (Germany) Martin Braxenthaler (sit) (Switzerland) Thomas Pfyl (stand) |
| January 17, 2007 | Aspen, Colo. United States | SG 2 | no finishers (VI) (Canada) Kimberly Joines (sit) (Canada) Lauren Woolstencroft (stand) | (Canada) Chris Williamson (VI) (Germany) Martin Braxenthaler (sit) (Switzerland) Thomas Pfyl (stand) |
| January 18, 2007 | Aspen, Colo. United States | GS | (Austria) Sabine Gasteiger (VI) (United States) Stephani Victor (sit) (Germany) Andrea Rothfuss (stand) | (Germany) Gerd Gradwohl (VI) (Germany) Martin Braxenthaler (sit) (Australia) Cameron Rahls-Rahbula (stand) |
| January 19, 2007 | Aspen, Colo. United States | GS | (Austria) Sabine Gasteiger (VI) (Austria) Claudia Lösch (sit) (Germany) Andrea Rothfuss (stand) | (Spain) Jon Santacana (VI) (Germany) Martin Braxenthaler (sit) (Switzerland) Thomas Pfyl (stand) |
| January 20, 2007 | Aspen, Colo. United States | SL | (Austria) Sabine Gasteiger (VI) (United States) Stephani Victor (sit) (Canada) Lauren Woolstencroft (stand) | (Canada) Chris Williamson (VI) (Germany) Martin Braxenthaler (sit) (Australia) Marty Mayberry (stand) |
| January 21, 2007 | Aspen, Colo. United States | SL | (Austria) Sabine Gasteiger (VI) (United States) Stephani Victor (sit) (Canada) Lauren Woolstencroft (stand) | (Canada) Chris Williamson (VI) (Austria) Jürgen Egle (sit) (Japan) Masahiko Tokai (stand) |
| January 24, 2007 | Kimberley, B.C. Canada | SG | (Austria) Sabine Gasteiger (VI) (United States) Laurie Stephens (sit) (Canada) Lauren Woolstencroft (stand) | (Canada) Chris Williamson (VI) (Australia) Shannon Dallas (sit) (Switzerland) Thoms Pfyl (stand) |
| January 25, 2007 | Kimberley, B.C. Canada | GS | (Austria) Sabine Gasteiger (VI) (Japan) Kuniko Obinata (sit) (Canada) Lauren Woolstencroft (stand) | (Canada) Chris Williamson(VI) (Germany) Martin Braxenthaler (sit) (Switzerland) Thoms Pfyl (stand) |
| January 26, 2007 | Kimberley, B.C. Canada | SL | (Austria) Sabine Gasteiger (VI) (United States) Stephani Victor (sit) (Canada) Lauren Woolstencroft (stand) | (Spain) Jon Santacana (VI) (Japan) Takeshi Suzuki (sit) (Japan) Masahiko Tokai (stand) |
| ~~March 5, 2007~~ | ~~Abtenau, Tennengau Austria~~ | ~~SL~~ | canceled | canceled |
| ~~March 6, 2007~~ | ~~Abtenau, Tennengau Austria~~ | ~~GS~~ | canceled | canceled |
| ~~March 7, 2007~~ | ~~Abtenau, Tennengau Austria~~ | ~~GS~~ | canceled | canceled |
| ~~March 8, 2007~~ | ~~Abtenau, Tennengau Austria~~ | ~~SC~~ | canceled | canceled |
| March 12, 2007 | Arta Terme/Zoncolan, Italy | SL | | |
| March 13, 2007 | Arta Terme/Zoncolan, Italy | GS | | |
| March 14, 2007 | Arta Terme/Zoncolan, Italy | SG 1 | | |
| ~~March 9, 2007~~; March 14, 2007 | ~~Abtenau, Tennengau Austria~~; Arta Terme/Zoncolan, Italy | SG 2 | rescheduled | rescheduled |

== Standings ==
=== Women (overall) ===
==== Visually impaired ====
| Pos. | | Points |
|---|---|---|
| 1. | (Austria) (x) Sabine Gasteiger (B 3) | 800 |
| 2. | (Canada) Kathleen Forestell (B 3) | 320 |
| 3. | (Czech Republic) Anna Kuliskova (B 2) | 220 |

(x) clinched World Cup title

==== Sitting ====
| Pos. | | Points |
|---|---|---|
| 1. | (United States) Stephani Victor (LW 12–2) | 640 |
| 2. | (Austria) Claudia Lösch (LW 11) | 555 |
| 3. | (United States) Laurie Stephens (LW 12–1) | 410 |

==== Standing ====
| Pos. | | Points |
|---|---|---|
| 1. | (Canada) Lauren Woolstencroft (LW 3–1) | 780 |
| 2. | (Germany) Andrea Rothfuss (LW 6/8-2) | 660 |
| 3. | (France) Solène Jambaqué (LW 9–2) | 405 |

=== Men's (overall) ===
==== Visually impaired ====
| Pos. | | Points |
|---|---|---|
| 1. | (Canada) Chris Williamson (B 3) | 680 |
| 2. | (Spain) Jon Santacana (B 2) | 605 |
| 3. | (Italy) Gianmaria Dal Maistro (B 3) | 565 |

==== Sitting ====
| Pos. | | Points |
|---|---|---|
| 1. | (Germany) Martin Braxenthaler (LW 10–2) | 790 |
| 2. | (Austria) Jürgen Egle (LW 11) | 476 |
| 3. | (Austria) Klaus Salzmann (LW 11) | 341 |

==== Standing ====
| Pos. | | Points |
|---|---|---|
| 1. | (Switzerland) Thomas Pfyl (LW 9–2) | 656 |
| 2. | (Japan) Masahiko Tokai (LW 3–2) | 583 |
| 3. | (Austria) Walter Lackner (LW 6/8-2) | 376 |

=== Nations Cup ===
| Pos. | | Points |
|---|---|---|
| 1. | Austria | 4370 |
| 2. | United States | 2335 |
| 3. | Germany | 2330 |
