= 2009 IPC Alpine Skiing World Championships =

The 2009 IPC Alpine Skiing World Championships were held at High 1 resort, Pyeongchang, South Korea.

== Events ==
=== Men ===
Event	Class	Gold	Time	Silver	Time	Bronze	Time
Downhill	Visually impaired	Gerd Gradwohl (GER) (Guide: Karl-Heinz Vachenauer)	1:44.51	Jon Santacana (ESP) (Guide: Miguel Galindo)	1:44.52	Christopher Williamson (CAN) (Guide: Nicholas Brush)	1:44.56
Downhill	Sitting	Joshua Dueck (CAN)	1:49.66	Harald Eder (AUT)	1:49.70	Christopher Devlin-Young (USA)	1:50.49
Downhill	Standing	Gerd Schoenfelder (GER)	1:50.19	Michael Bruegger (SUI)	1:51.56	Martin France (SVK)	1:52.39
Super-G	Visually impaired	Christopher Williamson (CAN) (Guide: Nicholas Brush)	58.46	Jon Santacana (ESP) (Guide: Miguel Galindo)	59.79	Miroslav Haraus (SVK) (Guide: Martin Makovnik)	1:00.17
Super-G	Sitting	Shannon Dallas (AUS)	1:00.52	Akira Kano (JPN)	1:01.50	Taiki Morii (JPN)	1:01.98
Super-G	Standing	Robert Meusburger (AUT)	1:02.39	Gerd Schoenfelder (GER)	1:03.41	Lionel Brun (FRA)	1:03.79
Super combined	Visually impaired	Jon Santacana (ESP) (Guide: Miguel Galindo)	1:53.69	Jakub Krako (SVK) (Guide: Juraj Medera)	1:56.15	Gianmaria dal Maistro (ITA) (Guide: Tommaso Balasso)	1:58.36
Super combined	Sitting	Martin Braxenthaler (GER)	1:54.08	Taiki Morii (JPN)	1:55.28	Juergen Egle (AUT)	1:55.55
Super combined	Standing	Gerd Schoenfelder (GER)	1:54.37	Robert Meusburger (AUT)	1:55.13	Michael Bruegger (SUI)	1:55.99
Giant slalom	Visually impaired	Nicolas Berejny (FRA) (Guide: Sophie Troc)	2:14.20	Jakub Krako (SVK) (Guide: Juraj Medera)	2:17.36	Gianmaria dal Maistro (ITA) (Guide: Tommaso Balasso)	2:17.48
Giant slalom	Sitting	Takeshi Suzuki (JPN)	2:11.79	Akira Kano (JPN)	2:12.97	Andreas Kapfinger (AUT)	2:14.72
Giant slalom	Standing	Gerd Schoenfelder (GER)	2:12.55	Robert Meausburger (AUT)	2:13.35	Cameron Rahls-Rahbula (AUS)	2:13.70
Slalom	Visually impaired	Jakub Krako (SVK) (Guide: Juraj Medera)	1:41.96	Christopher Williamson (CAN) (Guide: Nicholas Brush)	1:43.53	Miroslav Haraus (SVK) (Guide: Martin Makovnik)	1:43.60
Slalom	Sitting	Juergen Egle (AUT)	1:42.29	Jean Yves le Meur (FRA)	1:43.24	Martin Braxenthaler (GER)	1:43.47
Slalom	Standing	Cameron Rahls-Rahbula (AUS)	1:40.97	Adam Hall (NZL)	1:41.47	Hiraku Misawa (JPN)	1:42.64

=== Women ===
Event	Class	Gold	Time	Silver	Time	Bronze	Time
Downhill	Visually impaired	Henrieta Farkasova (SVK) (Guide: Natalia Subrtova)	1:56.61	Viviane Forest (CAN) (Guide: Lindsay Debou	2:05.59	Anna Kuliskova (CZE) (Guide: Michaela Hubacova	2:06.03
Downhill	Sitting	Kimberly Joines (CAN)	1:58.39	Kuniko Obinata (JPN)	2:01.16	Tatsuko Aoki (JPN)	2:17.55
Downhill	Standing	Laure Woolstencroft (CAN)	1:56.61	Melania Corradini (ITA)	1:59.96	Andrea Rothfuss (GER)	2:00.66
Super-G	Visually impaired	Henrieta Farkasova (SVK) (Guide: Natalia Subrtova)	1:07.96	Viviane Forest (CAN) (Guide: Lindsay Debou	1:08.11	Anna Kuliskova (CZE) (Guide: Michaela Hubacova	1:11.62
Super-G	Sitting	Kimberly Joines (CAN)	1:06.29	Stephani Victor (USA)	1:06.65	Kuniko Obinata (JPN)	1:08.09
Super-G	Standing	Laure Woolstencroft (CAN)	1:03.06	Danja Haslacher (AUT)	1:05.97	Melania Corradini (ITA)	1:06.57
Super combined	Visually impaired	Viviane Forest (CAN) (Guide: Lindsay Debou	2:07.88	Henrieta Farkasova (SVK) (Guide: Natalia Subrtova)	2:11.29	Natasha de Troyer (BEL) (Guide: Diego Van de Voorde)	2:17.40
Super combined	Sitting	Stephani Victor (USA)	2:07.63	Claudia Loesch (AUT)	2:09.68	Kuniko Obinata (JPN)	2:11.31
Super combined	Standing	Melania Corradini (ITA)	2:05.41	Allison Jones (USA)	2:05.94	Andrea Rothfuss (GER)	2:06.06
Giant slalom	Visually impaired	Sabine Gasteiger (AUT) (Guide: Emil Gasteiger	2:25:46	Viviane Forest (CAN) (Guide: Lindsay Debou	2:30.27	Anna Kuliskova (CZE) (Guide: Michaela Hubacova	2:39.90
Giant slalom	Sitting	Stephani Victor (USA)	2:26.12	Claudia Loesch (AUT)	2:33.06	Tatsuko Aoki (JPN)	2:33.98
Giant slalom	Standing	Laure Woolstencroft (CAN)	2:13.78	Melania Corradini (ITA)	2:19.67	Andrea Rothfuss (GER)	2:25.18
Slalom	Visually Impaired	Sabine Gasteiger (AUT) (Guide: Emil Gasteiger	1:59.75	Viviane Forest (CAN) (Guide: Lindsay Debou	2:00.12	Anna Cohi (ESP) (Guide: Raquel Garcia)	2:02.11
Slalom	Sitting	Stephani Victor (USA)	2:07.86	Kimberly Joines (CAN)	2:09.50	Yoshiko Tanaka (JPN)	2:12.74
Slalom	Standing	Laure Woolstencroft (CAN)	1:48.43	Allison Jones (USA)	1:50.96	Andrea Rothfuss (GER)	1:52.57

=== Team ===
Event	Gold	Time	Silver	Time	Bronze	Time
Team	Germany (GER)	7:20.36	Austria (AUT)	7:25.37	Switzerland (SUI)	7:32.32

== Medal table ==
* Host nation (South Korea)

Rank	Nation	Gold	Silver	Bronze	Total
1	Canada (CAN)	9	6	1	16
2	Germany (GER)	6	1	5	12
3	Austria (AUT)	4	7	2	13
4	Slovakia (SVK)	3	3	3	9
5	United States (USA)	3	3	1	7
6	Australia (AUS)	2	0	1	3
7	Japan (JPN) (Note: Source incorrectly reports 5 silvers and 6 bronzes)	1	4	7	12
8	Italy (ITA)	1	2	3	6
9	Spain (ESP)	1	2	1	4
10	France (FRA)	1	1	1	3
11	Switzerland (SUI)	0	1	2	3
12	New Zealand (NZL)	0	1	0	1
13	Czech Republic (CZE)	0	0	3	3
14	Belgium (BEL)	0	0	1	1
Totals (14 entries)		31	31	31	93

== Participating nations ==
25 nations participated.

- Australia
- Austria
- Belgium
- Canada
- Croatia
- Czech Republic
- Finland
- France
- Germany
- Hungary
- Italy
- Iran
- Japan
- Netherlands
- New Zealand
- Poland
- Russia
- Serbia
- Slovakia
- South Africa
- South Korea
- Spain
- Switzerland
- United Kingdom
- United States
