= Alpine skiing at the 2006 Winter Paralympics – Women's giant slalom =

Alpine skiing - Women's giant slalom at the IX Paralympic Winter Games
- Venue: Sestriere
- Dates: 16–17 March 2006

Women's giant slalom events at the 2006 Winter Paralympics were contested at Sestriere on 16 and 17 March.

There were 3 events. Each was contested by skiers from a range of disability classes, and the standings were decided by applying a disability factor to the actual times achieved. All times shown below are calculated times, except for the final "Real time" column.

== Visually impaired ==
The visually impaired event took place on 17 March. It was won by Silvia Parente, representing Italy.

Rank	Name	Country	Class	Run1	Run2	Result	Diff	Real time
1st place, gold medalist(s)	Silvia Parente; Guide: Lorenzo Migliari	Italy	B1	1:03.79 (1)	1:00.72 (3)	2:04.51		3:36.51
2nd place, silver medalist(s)	Pascale Casanova; Guide: Benedicte Sainas	France	B2	1:06.51 (3)	58.27 (1)	2:04.78	+0.27	2:21.75
3rd place, bronze medalist(s)	Sabine Gasteiger; Guide: Emil Gasteiger	Austria	B3	1:05.56 (2)	1:00.27 (2)	2:05.83	+1.32	2:18.15
4	Anna Kuliskova; Guide: Martin Kulisek	Czech Republic	B2	1:14.53 (5)	1:05.46 (4)	2:19.99	+15.48	2:39.03
5	Natasha De Troyer; Guide: Eric Maurice Dejager	Belgium	B2	1:12.34 (4)	1:08.38 (6)	2:20.72	+16.21	2:39.86
6	Carmen Garcia Rigav; Guide: Marina Romero	Spain	B3	1:15.49 (6)	1:07.98 (5)	2:23.47	+18.96	2:37.51
7	Anna Cohi; Guide: Marc Oliveras	Spain	B3	1:22.47 (7)	1:17.34 (8)	2:39.81	+35.30	2:55.45
8	Alba De Toro; Guide: Anna Maresma	Spain	B1	1:28.36 (9)	1:15.00 (7)	2:43.36	+38.85	4:44.07
9	Anna Coma; Guide: Francisco Manuel Borromeo	Spain	B1	1:23.74 (8)	1:41.92 (10)	3:05.66	+1.15	5:22.84
10	Francesca Ramirez; Guide: Manel Fernandez	Andorra	B2	1:41.48 (10)	1:30.32 (9)	3:11.80	+7.29	3:37.88

== Sitting ==
The sitting event took place on 17 March. It was won by Kuniko Obinata, representing Japan.

Rank	Name	Country	Class	Run1	Run2	Result	Diff	Real time
1st place, gold medalist(s)	Kuniko Obinata	Japan	LW12-2	1:05.82 (1)	59.21 (2)	2:05.03		2:24.18
2nd place, silver medalist(s)	Laurie Stephens	United States	LW12-1	1:06.65 (3)	58.46 (1)	2:05.11	+0.08	2:25.95
3rd place, bronze medalist(s)	Daila Dameno	Italy	LW10-2	1:05.85 (2)	1:02.23 (4)	2:08.08	+3.05	2:41.13
4	Stephani Victor	United States	LW12-2	1:09.96 (4)	1:02.67 (5)	2:12.63	+7.60	2:32.94
5	Claudia Loesch	Austria	LW11	1:12.45 (5)	1:03.57 (7)	2:16.02	+10.99	2:40.55
6	Tatsuko Aoki	Japan	LW10-2	1:13.79 (6)	1:02.85 (6)	2:16.64	+11.61	2:51.91
7	Kimberly Joines	Canada	LW12-1	1:19.96 (9)	1:00.52 (3)	2:20.48	+15.45	2:43.88
8	Lacey Heward	United States	LW11	1:14.56 (7)	1:07.94 (8)	2:22.50	+17.47	2:48.20
9	Christiane Singhammer	Germany	LW12-2	1:15.80 (8)	1:09.00 (9)	2:24.80	+19.77	2:46.96
10	Agnes Vass	Hungary	LW11	1:35.75 (10)	1:25.65 (10)	3:01.40	+56.37	3:34.11
11	Greta Khndzrtsyan	Armenia	LW12-2	2:01.24 (11)	1:42.05 (11)	3:43.29	+38.26	4:17.47
-	Yoshiko Tanaka	Japan	LW12-2	DNF				

== Standing ==
The standing event took place on 16 March. It was won by Lauren Woolstencroft, representing Canada.

Rank	Name	Country	Class	Run1	Run2	Result	Diff	Real time
1st place, gold medalist(s)	Lauren Woolstencroft	Canada	LW3-1	1:02.99 (1)	54.82 (2)	1:57.81		2:07.03
2nd place, silver medalist(s)	Andrea Rothfuss	Germany	LW6/8-2	1:04.26 (2)	55.16 (3)	1:59.42	+1.61	1:59.42
3rd place, bronze medalist(s)	Solène Jambaqué	France	LW9-2	1:05.40 (3)	54.41 (1)	1:59.81	+2.00	2:08.97
4	Iveta Chlebakova	Slovakia	LW6/8-2	1:05.73 (4)	56.16 (4)	2:01.89	+4.08	2:01.89
5	Allison Jones	United States	LW2	1:06.57 (6)	56.59 (5)	2:03.16	+5.35	2:14.10
6	Theresa Kempfle	Germany	LW6/8-2	1:06.12 (5)	59.09 (12)	2:05.21	+7.40	2:05.21
7	Evgenia Ponomareva	Russia	LW6/8-2	1:07.62 (7)	57.64 (7)	2:05.26	+7.45	2:05.26
8	Sandy Dukat	United States	LW2	1:08.52 (9)	56.84 (6)	2:05.36	+7.55	2:16.50
9	Reinhild Möller	Germany	LW4	1:08.10 (8)	58.41 (10)	2:06.51	+8.70	2:07.44
10	Danja Haslacher	Austria	LW2	1:11.00 (11)	57.80 (8)	2:08.80	+10.99	2:20.24
11	Elitsa Storey	United States	LW2	1:12.12 (13)	58.37 (9)	2:10.49	+12.68	2:22.08
12	Petra Smarzova	Slovakia	LW6/8-2	1:11.86 (12)	1:00.03 (13)	2:11.89	+14.08	2:11.89
13	Inga Medvedeva	Russia	LW2	1:14.52 (16)	58.75 (11)	2:13.27	+15.46	2:25.11
14	Liz Miller	Great Britain	LW4	1:12.53 (14)	1:00.93 (14)	2:13.46	+15.65	2:14.44
15	Arly Fogarty	Canada	LW5/7-2	1:10.87 (10)	1:03.46 (16)	2:14.33	+16.52	2:16.60
16	Naomi Sasaki	Japan	LW6/8-2	1:13.17 (15)	1:01.21 (15)	2:14.38	+16.57	2:14.38
17	Oxana Miryasova	Russia	LW2	1:14.74 (17)	1:04.23 (17)	2:18.97	+21.16	2:31.31
18	Slava Janasova	Slovakia	LW9-2	1:14.99 (18)	1:05.57 (20)	2:20.56	+22.75	2:31.31
19	Hannah Pennington	United States	LW3-2	1:15.88 (19)	1:04.92 (19)	2:20.80	+22.99	2:30.68
20	Katja Saarinen	Finland	LW2	1:16.98 (20)	1:04.75 (18)	2:21.73	+23.92	2:34.32
21	Emily Jansen	Australia	LW2	1:25.97 (21)	1:10.21 (21)	2:36.18	+38.37	2:50.06
-	Melania Corradini	Italy	LW6/8-1	DNS				
