= Czech Republic at the 2006 Winter Paralympics =

- IPC code: CZE
- NPC: Czech Paralympic Committee
- Website: www.paralympic.cz

in Turin
- Competitors: 5 in 1 sport
- Flag bearer: Anna Kulíšková
- Medals Ranked 17th: Gold 0 Silver 1 Bronze 0 Total 1

Winter Paralympics appearances (overview)
- 1994; 1998; 2002; 2006; 2010; 2014; 2018; 2022; 2026

Other related appearances
- Czechoslovakia (1976–1992)

The Czech Republic participated in the ninth Winter Paralympics in Turin, Italy.

== Competitors ==
The following is the list of number of competitors participating at the Games per sport/discipline.

Sport	Men	Women	Total
Alpine skiing	4	1	5
Total	4	1	5

They were:

- Stanislav Loska - amputation of upper limb
- Michal Nevrkla - above-knee amputation
- Jan Dostál - above-knee amputation
- Radim Kozlovský - paraplegic
- Anna Kulíšková - vision-impaired

At the opening ceremonies of these Paralympic Games, the flag-bearer for the Czech Republic was Anna Kulíšková.

== Medalists ==
Medal	Name	Sport	Event	Date
Silver	Anna Kulíšková	Alpine skiing	Women's super-G, visually impaired	14 March

== Alpine skiing ==
All five athletes representing the Czech republic participated in the Alpine skiing event.

=== Results ===
Men

Athlete	Event	Run 1			Run 2			Final/Total		
Athlete	Event	Time	Diff	Rank	Time	Diff	Rank	Time	Diff	Rank
Stanislav Loska	Men's super-G standing	—N/a						1:18.41	+6.54	39
Stanislav Loska	Men's giant slalom standing	1:01.16	+4.04	11	56.70	+6.29	28	1:57.86	+9.25	16
Stanislav Loska	Men's slalom standing	46.05	+3.24	21	41.43	+3.12	18	1:27.48	+5.47	18
Jan Dostál	Men's downhill standing	—N/a						1:31.23	+12.74	37
Jan Dostál	Men's super-G standing	—N/a						1:19.03	+7.16	43
Jan Dostál	Men's giant slalom standing	1:09.64	+12.52	40	1:00.22	+9.81	40	2:21.39	+21.25	36
Jan Dostál	Men's slalom standing	49.20	+6.39	35	44.58	+6.27	29	1:33.78	+11.78	29
Michal Nevrkla	Men's downhill standing	—N/a						1:31.30	+12.81	39
Michal Nevrkla	Men's super-G standing	—N/a						1:17.66	+5.79	35
Michal Nevrkla	Men's giant slalom standing	1:08.83	+11.71	38	58.22	+7.81	36	2:07.05	+18.44	33
Michal Nevrkla	Men's slalom standing	48.23	+5.42	31	43.01	+4.70	25	1:31.24	+9.23	26
Radim Kozlovský	Men's super-G sitting	—N/a						1:22.55	+9.72	26
Radim Kozlovský	Men's giant slalom sitting	1:03.35	+5.16	14	57.20	+4.56	14	2:00.55	+9.72	13
Radim Kozlovský	Men's slalom sitting	55.65	+11.91	25	DNF					

Women

Athlete	Event	Run 1			Run 2			Final/Total		
Athlete	Event	Time	Diff	Rank	Time	Diff	Rank	Time	Diff	Rank
Anna Kulíšková; Guide: Martin Kulíšek	Women's downhill Visually impaired	—N/a						DNF		
Anna Kulíšková; Guide: Martin Kulíšek	Women's super-G Visually impaired	—N/a						1:25.99	+1.75	Silver medal
Anna Kulíšková; Guide: Martin Kulíšek	Women's giant slalom Visually impaired	1:14.53	+9.74	5	1:05.46	+7.19	4	2:19.99	+15.48	4
Anna Kulíšková; Guide: Martin Kulíšek	Women's slalom Visually impaired	DNQ								

=== Downhill ===
The first competition for members of the team was downhill skiing at the Borgata ski slope, one of the most dreaded, and the results were disappointing. Anna Kulíšková did not finish her runs in the competition. She lost her footing and ended up in the safety net. Her teammate Michal Nevrkla lost control at the same place in the course, but he regained his footing, finishing the competition in 39th place. In the same competition, Jan Dostál finished in 37th place. Stanislav Loska and Radim Kozlovský did not take part in this competition.

=== Super-G ===
Two days later was the super G competition. In this event Anna Kulíšková won the silver medal; her first medal in her 4-year-long competitive career. Sabine Gasteiger from Austria took home the gold medal. Radim Kozlovský also entered the super G events, finishing in 26th place.

=== Giant slalom ===
In the giant slalom, the Czech men were not as successful as Anna Kulíšková. Stanislav Loska started very well in first round, and from 11th place, he was shooting for a place in top ten. Taking big risks in the second round, he ended up in a collision, and he finished in 16th place. Michal Nevrkla and Jan Dostál also participated in this competition, finishing in 33rd and 36th place, respectively.

The next day was the giant slalom event with Anna Kulíšková. She wanted to repeat her silver medal success from the super G event. She was too slow and cautious in the first round and ending up finishing just short of medal standing in 4th place.

Thirteenth place in the giant slalom was a big individual success for Radim Kozlovský.

=== Slalom ===
The last event for the Czech team in Turin was the special slalom. The Czech men were not very successful, and failed to place anywhere in the top ten. Jan Dostál took 30th place, Michal Nevrkla 26th place, with the best ranking being Stanislav Loska at 18th place. Stanislav Loska took the bronze medal in the slalom in Lillehammer in 1994. But now that all men with some type of amputation compete together in one category, the competitive field has grown larger.

The most successful Czech Paralympic skier is Kateřina Teplá. She did not get her start in Turin. Kateřina is vision-impaired and belongs to category B3, because she is "only" shortsighted. Today, she is the best Czech skier with 3 gold medals and 1 silver medal from Nagano 1998 and 2 gold medals and 1 silver medal from Salt Lake City. In 2002, she was named the best Czech Paralympic athlete.

== See also ==
- 2006 Winter Paralympics
- Czech Republic at the 2006 Winter Olympics
