= Alpine skiing at the 2006 Winter Paralympics – Women's downhill =

Alpine skiing - Women's downhill at the IX Paralympic Winter Games
- Venue: Sestriere

Women's downhill skiing events at the 2006 Winter Paralympics were contested at Sestriere on 11 and 12 March.

There were three events. Each was contested by skiers from a range of disability classes, and the standings were decided by applying a disability factor to the actual times achieved.

== Visually impaired ==
The visually impaired event took place on 12 March. It was won by Pascale Casanova, representing France.

Rank	Name	Country	Class	Real time	Calc time	Difference
1st place, gold medalist(s)	Pascale Casanova; Guide: Benedicte Sainas	France	B2	1:43.62	1:28.79	
2nd place, silver medalist(s)	Sabine Gasteiger; Guide: Emil Gasteiger	Austria	B3	1:43.17	1:32.61	+3.82
3rd place, bronze medalist(s)	Silvia Parente; Guide: Lorenzo Migliari	Italy	B1	2:48.42	1:34.37	+5.58
4	Carmen Garcia Rigav; Guide: Marina Romero	Spain	B3	1:57.44	1:45.42	+16.63
5	Natasha De Troyer; Guide: Eric Maurice Dejager	Belgium	B2	2:04.91	1:47.03	+18.24
-	Anna Kuliskova; Guide: Martin Kulisek	Czech Republic	B2			

== Sitting ==
The sitting event took place on 12 March. It was won by Laurie Stephens, representing United States.

Rank	Name	Country	Class	Real time	Calc time	Difference
1st place, gold medalist(s)	Laurie Stephens	United States	LW12-1	1:46.86	1:29.96	
2nd place, silver medalist(s)	Kuniko Obinata	Japan	LW12-2	1:46.70	1:30.89	+0.93
3rd place, bronze medalist(s)	Claudia Loesch	Austria	LW11	1:50.34	1:31.30	+1.34
4	Lacey Heward	United States	LW11	1:56.71	1:36.57	+6.61
-	Stephani Victor	United States	LW12-2	DNS		
-	Tatsuko Aoki	Japan	LW10-2	DNF		
-	Kimberly Joines	Canada	LW12-1	DNF		

== Standing ==
The standing event took place on 11 March. It was won by Solène Jambaqué, representing France.

Rank	Name	Country	Class	Real time	Calc time	Difference
1st place, gold medalist(s)	Solène Jambaqué	France	LW9-2	1:32.31	1:28.00	
2nd place, silver medalist(s)	Reinhild Möller	Germany	LW4	1:30.23	1:30.00	+2.00
3rd place, bronze medalist(s)	Iveta Chlebakova	Slovakia	LW6/8-2	1:30.43	1:30.43	+2.43
4	Lauren Woolstencroft	Canada	LW3-1	1:37.91	1:31.64	+3.64
5	Danja Haslacher	Austria	LW2	1:38.33	1:33.05	+5.05
6	Melania Corradini	Italy	LW6/8-1	1:33.31	1:33.12	+5.12
7	Allison Jones	United States	LW2	1:40.58	1:35.18	+7.18
8	Sandy Dukat	United States	LW2	1:40.95	1:35.53	+7.53
9	Elitsa Storey	United States	LW2	1:42.69	1:37.17	+9.17
10	Liz Miller	Great Britain	LW4	1:40.44	1:40.19	+12.19
11	Arly Fogarty	Canada	LW5/7-2	1:43.36	1:41.59	+13.59
12	Katja Saarinen	Finland	LW2	1:50.33	1:44.40	+16.40
13	Naomi Sasaki	Japan	LW6/8-2	1:50.03	1:50.03	+22.03
