= Austria at the 2006 Winter Paralympics =

- IPC code: AUT
- NPC: Austrian Paralympic Committee
- Website: www.oepc.at (in German)

in Turin
- Competitors: 25 in 2 sports
- Medals Ranked 7th: Gold 3 Silver 4 Bronze 7 Total 14

Winter Paralympics appearances (overview)
- 1976; 1980; 1984; 1988; 1992; 1994; 1998; 2002; 2006; 2010; 2014; 2018; 2022; 2026

Austria participated in the ninth Winter Paralympics in Turin, Italy.

== Team ==
Austria entered 25 athletes in the following sports:

- Alpine skiing: 20 male, 3 female
- Nordic skiing: 2 male

== Medalists ==
Medal	Name	Sport	Event	Date
Gold	Walter Lackner	Alpine skiing	Men's super-G, standing	13 March
Gold	Sabine Gasteiger	Alpine skiing	Women's super-G, visually impaired	14 March
Gold	Robert Meusburger	Alpine skiing	Men's slalom, standing	19 March
Silver	Sabine Gasteiger	Alpine skiing	Women's downhill, visually impaired	12 March
Silver	Harald Eder	Alpine skiing	Men's super-G, sitting	14 March
Silver	Sabine Gasteiger	Alpine skiing	Women's slalom, visually impaired	19 March
Silver	Harald Eder	Alpine skiing	Men's slalom, sitting	19 March
Bronze	Walter Lackner	Alpine skiing	Men's downhill, standing	11 March
Bronze	Claudia Lösch	Alpine skiing	Women's downhill, sitting	12 March
Bronze	Danja Haslacher	Alpine skiing	Women's super-G, standing	13 March
Bronze	Robert Fröhle	Alpine skiing	Men's super-G, sitting	14 March
Bronze	Sabine Gasteiger	Alpine skiing	Women's giant slalom, visually impaired	17 March
Bronze	Jürgen Egle	Alpine skiing	Men's giant slalom, sitting	17 March
Bronze	Jürgen Egle	Alpine skiing	Men's slalom, sitting	19 March

== See also ==
- 2006 Winter Paralympics
- Austria at the 2006 Winter Olympics
