= Alpine skiing at the 2006 Winter Paralympics – Women's super-G =

Alpine skiing – women's super-G at the IX Paralympic Winter Games
- Venue: Sestriere

Women's super-G events at the 2006 Winter Paralympics were contested at Sestriere on 13 and 14 March.

There were 3 events. Each was contested by skiers from a range of disability classes, and the standings were decided by applying a disability factor to the actual times achieved.

== Visually impaired ==
The visually impaired event took place on 14 March. It was won by Sabine Gasteiger, representing Austria.

Rank	Name	Country	Class	Real time	Calc time	Difference
1st place, gold medalist(s)	Sabine Gasteiger; Guide: Emil Gasteiger	Austria	B3	1:34.64	1:24.24	
2nd place, silver medalist(s)	Anna Kuliskova; Guide: Martin Kulisek	Czech Republic	B2	1:40.63	1:25.99	+1.75
3rd place, bronze medalist(s)	Silvia Parente; Guide: Lorenzo Migliari	Italy	B1	2:33.46	1:26.79	+2.55
4	Carmen Garcia Rigav; Guide: Marina Romero	Spain	B3	1:45.97	1:34.32	+10.08
5	Natasha De Troyer; Guide: Eric Maurice Dejager	Belgium	B2	1:57.01	1:39.99	+15.75
6	Anna Cohi; Guide: Marc Oliveras	Spain	B3	2:06.04	1:52.18	+27.94
-	Pascale Casanova; Guide: Benedicte Sainas	France	B2	DSQ		
-	Alba De Toro; Guide: Anna Maresma	Spain	B1	DSQ		

== Sitting ==
The sitting event took place on 14 March. It was won by Laurie Stephens, representing United States.

Rank	Name	Country	Class	Real time	Calc time	Difference
1st place, gold medalist(s)	Laurie Stephens	United States	LW12-1	1:33.88	1:19.16	
2nd place, silver medalist(s)	Kuniko Obinata	Japan	LW12-2	1:36.36	1:22.22	+3.06
3rd place, bronze medalist(s)	Kimberly Joines	Canada	LW12-1	1:38.48	1:23.04	+3.88
4	Stephani Victor	United States	LW12-2	1:37.80	1:23.44	+4.28
5	Tatsuko Aoki	Japan	LW10-2	1:47.03	1:25.76	+6.60
6	Daila Dameno	Italy	LW10-2	1:47.35	1:26.02	+6.86
7	Claudia Loesch	Austria	LW11	1:44.35	1:26.71	+7.55
8	Lacey Heward	United States	LW11	1:45.42	1:27.60	+8.44

== Standing ==
The standing event took place on 13 March. It was won by Solène Jambaqué, representing France.

Rank	Name	Country	Class	Real time	Calc time	Difference
1st place, gold medalist(s)	Solène Jambaqué	France	LW9-2	1:20.24	1:14.13	
2nd place, silver medalist(s)	Lauren Woolstencroft	Canada	LW3-1	1:22.67	1:16.13	+2.00
3rd place, bronze medalist(s)	Danja Haslacher	Austria	LW2	1:25.04	1:18.47	+4.34
4	Allison Jones	United States	LW2	1:26.04	1:19.39	+5.26
5	Andrea Rothfuss	Germany	LW6/8-2	1:19.49	1:19.49	+5.36
6	Sandy Dukat	United States	LW2	1:26.85	1:20.14	+6.01
7	Elitsa Storey	United States	LW2	1:27.22	1:20.48	+6.35
8	Evgenia Ponomareva	Russia	LW6/8-2	1:21.25	1:21.25	+7.12
9	Theresa Kempfle	Germany	LW6/8-2	1:21.63	1:21.63	+7.50
10	Arly Fogarty	Canada	LW5/7-2	1:26.31	1:25.28	+11.15
11	Petra Smarzova	Slovakia	LW6/8-2	1:26.47	1:26.47	+12.34
12	Inga Medvedeva	Russia	LW2	1:34.44	1:27.14	+13.01
13	Oxana Miryasova	Russia	LW2	1:35.10	1:27.75	+13.62
14	Katja Saarinen	Finland	LW2	1:36.13	1:28.70	+14.57
15	Naomi Sasaki	Japan	LW6/8-2	1:29.14	1:29.14	+15.01
16	Liz Miller	Great Britain	LW4	1:29.64	1:29.20	+15.07
-	Melania Corradini	Italy	LW6/8-1	DNF		
-	Reinhild Möller	Germany	LW4	DNF		
-	Iveta Chlebakova	Slovakia	LW6/8-2	DNF		
