= Andreas Schmid (alpine skier) =

Austrian para-alpine skier

Sport
- Country: Austria
- Sport: Para-alpine skiing
Medal record
Paralympic Games
| Silver medal – second place | 1998 Nagano | Downhill LW2 |

Andreas Schmid is an Austrian para-alpine skier. He represented Austria at the 1998 Winter Paralympics and at the 2006 Winter Paralympics.

In 1998, he won the silver medal at the Men's Downhill LW2 event.

== Achievements ==
| Year | Competition | Location | Position | Event | Time |
|---|---|---|---|---|---|
| 1998 | 1998 Winter Paralympics | Nagano, Japan | 2nd | Men's Downhill LW2 | 1:08.55 |
| 1998 | 1998 Winter Paralympics | Nagano, Japan | 6th | Men's Giant Slalom LW2 | 2:42.53 |
| 1998 | 1998 Winter Paralympics | Nagano, Japan | 9th | Men's Super-G LW2 | 1:15.76 |
| 1998 | 1998 Winter Paralympics | Nagano, Japan | 8th | Men's Slalom LW2 | 2:02.15 |
| 2006 | 2006 Winter Paralympics | Turin, Italy | 42nd | Men's Downhill Standing | 1:33.07 |
| 2006 | 2006 Winter Paralympics | Turin, Italy | 34th | Men's super-G standing | 1:17.64 |

== See also ==
- List of Paralympic medalists in alpine skiing
