= Hungary at the 2002 Winter Paralympics =

- IPC code: HUN
- NPC: Hungarian Paralympic Committee
- Website: www.hparalimpia.hu

in Salt Lake City, United States
- Competitors: 1 (1 man and 0 women) in 1 sport and 2 events
- Medals: Gold 0 Silver 0 Bronze 0 Total 0

Winter Paralympics appearances (overview)
- 2002; 2006; 2010; 2014; 2018; 2022; 2026

Hungary competed at the 2002 Winter Paralympics in Salt Lake City, United States. One competitor, Sandor Navratyil, from Hungary won no medals and so did not place in the medal table.

== See also ==
- Hungary at the Paralympics
- Hungary at the 2002 Winter Olympics
