= Hungary at the 2010 Winter Paralympics =

- IPC code: HUN
- NPC: Hungarian Paralympic Committee
- Website: www.hparalimpia.hu

in Vancouver
- Competitors: 2 in 1 sport
- Flag bearer: Balázs Koleszár
- Medals: Gold 0 Silver 0 Bronze 0 Total 0

Winter Paralympics appearances (overview)
- 2002; 2006; 2010; 2014; 2018; 2022; 2026

Hungary sent a delegation to compete at the 2010 Winter Paralympics, in Vancouver. It fielded a total of two athletes (one man and one woman), both in alpine skiing.

== Alpine skiing ==
The following two athletes represented Hungary in alpine skiing:

Athlete	Event	Final					
Athlete	Event	Run 1	Run 2	Run 3	Total Time	Calculated Time	Rank
Gyöngyi Dani							
Balázs Koleszár							

== See also ==
- Hungary at the 2010 Winter Olympics
- Hungary at the Paralympics
