= Hungary at the 2018 Winter Paralympics =

- IPC code: HUN
- NPC: Hungarian Paralympic Committee
- Website: www.hparalimpia.hu

in Pyeongchang
- Competitors: 2 in 2 sports
- Flag bearer: Zsolt Balogh
- Medals: Gold 0 Silver 0 Bronze 0 Total 0

Winter Paralympics appearances (overview)
- 2002; 2006; 2010; 2014; 2018; 2022; 2026

Hungary sent a delegation to compete at the 2018 Winter Paralympics, in Pyeongchang. It fielded a total of two athletes (one man and one woman).

== Alpine skiing ==
Men
