= Juergen Egle =

Austrian para-alpine skier

Sport
- Country: Austria
- Sport: Para-alpine skiing
- Disability class: LW11
Medal record
Paralympic Games
Gold medal – first place	1998 Nagano	Slalom LW11
Silver medal – second place	2002 Salt Lake City	Slalom LW11
Silver medal – second place	2002 Salt Lake City	Giant Slalom LW11
Bronze medal – third place	2006 Torino	Slalom Sitting
Bronze medal – third place	2006 Torino	Giant Slalom Sitting
Silver medal – second place	2010 Vancouver	Super Combined Sitting

Juergen Egle is an Austrian para-alpine skier. He represented Austria in alpine skiing at four Winter Paralympics: in 1998, 2002, 2006 and 2010. In total, he won one gold medal, three silver medals and two bronze medals.

== Career ==
In 1998, he won the gold medal in one alpine skiing event: the Men's Slalom LW11. In 2002 he won two silver medals: at the Men's Slalom LW11 event and at the Men's Giant Slalom LW11 event.

In 2006, he won two bronze medals: at the Men's Slalom Sitting event and at the Men's Giant Slalom Sitting event. He also competed in the men's super-G sitting event where he finished 13th.

In 2010, he won the silver medal at the Men's Super Combined Sitting event.

He also won one gold medal and one bronze medal at the 2009 IPC Alpine Skiing World Championships.

== Private life ==
He also participated in Race Across America in 2006 and the Race Across Australia in 2010 with a handcycle.

== See also ==
- List of Paralympic medalists in alpine skiing
