= Hungary at the 2022 Winter Paralympics =

- Flag of Hungary
- IPC code: HUN
- NPC: Hungarian Paralympic Committee
- Website: www.hparalimpia.hu

in Beijing, China 4 March 2022 – 13 March 2022
- Competitors: 1 (1 man) in 1 sport
- Medals: Gold 0 Silver 0 Bronze 0 Total 0

Winter Paralympics appearances (overview)
- 2002; 2006; 2010; 2014; 2018; 2022; 2026

Hungary competed at the 2022 Winter Paralympics in Beijing, China which took place between 4–13 March 2022.

== Competitors ==
The following is the list of number of competitors participating at the Games per sport/discipline.

| Sport | Men | Women | Total |
|---|---|---|---|
| Alpine skiing | 1 | 0 | 1 |
| Total | 1 | 0 | 1 |

== Alpine skiing ==
Richard Dumity competed in alpine skiing.

| Athlete | Event | Run 1 | | Run 2 | | Total | |
| Athlete | Event | Time | Rank | Time | Rank | Time | Rank |
|---|---|---|---|---|---|---|---|
| Richard Dumity | Men's giant slalom, sitting | 1:24.04 | 34 | 1:30.18 | 30 | 2:54.22 | 30 |
| Richard Dumity | Men's slalom, sitting | 1:12.11 | 27 | 1:21.86 | 16 | 2:33.97 | 16 |

== See also ==
- Hungary at the Paralympics
- Hungary at the 2022 Winter Olympics
