= Silvia Parente =

Italian para-alpine skier

Personal information
- Nationality: Italian

Sport
- Country: Italy
- Sport: Para-alpine skiing
- Event(s): Downhill slalom Giant slalom Super-G
Medal record
Women's para-alpine skiing
Representing Italy
Winter Paralympics
Gold medal – first place	2006 Turin	Giant slalom, visually impaired
Bronze medal – third place	1994 Lillehammer	Slalom, visually imparied
Bronze medal – third place	2006 Turin	Downhill, visually imparied
Bronze medal – third place	2006 Turin	Super-G, visually impaired
Bronze medal – third place	2006 Turin	Slalom, visually imparied

Silvia Parente is an Italian Paralympic gold medallist.

She won a gold medal, and three bronze at the 2006 Winter Paralympics in Turin.
