= Hannah Pennington =

American para-alpine skier

Hannah Pennington is an American alpine skier and Paralympian from Winter Park, Colorado.

== Early life ==
Pennington was diagnosed with spastic diplegia cerebral palsy at birth (a disease that affects the control, coordination and flexibility in the lower abdomen and leg muscles). She began skiing at the age of 6 with the Children's Hospital Handicapped Sports Program located in Denver, Colorado, and remained with the program until she graduated high school. She went on to attend university at Fort Lewis College in Durango, Colorado on a pre-med track studying both Biology and Spanish. During her freshman year, she joined the university's ski racing team. Pennington later continued her education at Metropolitan State University in Denver, Colorado and graduated in May 2014. Later in 2014, Pennington went on a trip to Finland where she met a fellow olympian who was a bronze medalist in sprint kayaking. She began training with him in Finland, and then sought out another trainer in Seattle, WA who helped her improve at the sport and work towards participating on the U.S. Paracanoe World Cup Team in 2015.

== Achievements ==
During the winter of 2001, Pennington earned a place on the U.S. Disabled Ski Team, from which she transitioned to the Paralympic team at the end of the same season. At the Winter Paralympic Games in 2002, she placed 5th and 7th in slalom ski racing. She participated in the Paralympics games again in 2010. In 2014, Pennington became the Paracanoe National Champion in both the 200m and 500m races. She was on the 2015 U.S. Paracanoe World Cup Team, winning the U.S. National Team Trials, and coming second place in KL2.

== Health complications ==
Pennington developed transverse myelitis in 2009, which paralyzed her for 15 days. During dinner one night, she discovered she could not stand up again after sitting down for a while. The paralysis eventually dissipated and Pennington reclaimed up to 80% of her strength, despite doctors being unable to discover the root cause. A year prior, Pennington had undergone hip surgery to implant screws in her pelvis and decided to have them removed in July 2009 after this episode.

== Personal life ==
In the summer of 2007, Pennington summited Mount Kilimanjaro with four other women with disabilities. She decided to pursue a career in sonography attending Labette Community College in Parsons, Kansas.
