= Robert Fröhle =

Austrian para-alpine skier

Sport
- Country: Austria
- Sport: Para-alpine skiing
Medal record
Paralympic Games
Bronze medal – third place	2006 Turin	Super-G sitting

Robert Fröhle is an Austrian para-alpine skier. He represented Austria at the Winter Paralympics in 2002, 2006 and 2010.

In 2006 he won one bronze medal in the Men's super-G sitting event.

== Achievements ==
Year	Competition	Location	Position	Event	Time
2002	2002 Winter Paralympics	Salt Lake City, United States	5th	Men's Downhill LW11	1:24.98
2006	2006 Winter Paralympics	Turin, Italy	15th	Men's Slalom Sitting	1:35.58
2006	2006 Winter Paralympics	Turin, Italy	3rd	Men's super-G sitting	1:15.04
2006	2006 Winter Paralympics	Turin, Italy	12th	Men's Giant Slalom Sitting	1:59.79
2006	2006 Winter Paralympics	Turin, Italy	13th	Men's Downhill Sitting	1:25.17
2010	2010 Winter Paralympics	Vancouver, Canada	6th	Men's super-G sitting	1:24.00
2010	2010 Winter Paralympics	Vancouver, Canada	8th	Men's Giant Slalom Sitting	2:49.83

== See also ==
- List of Paralympic medalists in alpine skiing
