= Solène Jambaqué =

French para-alpine skier (born 1988)

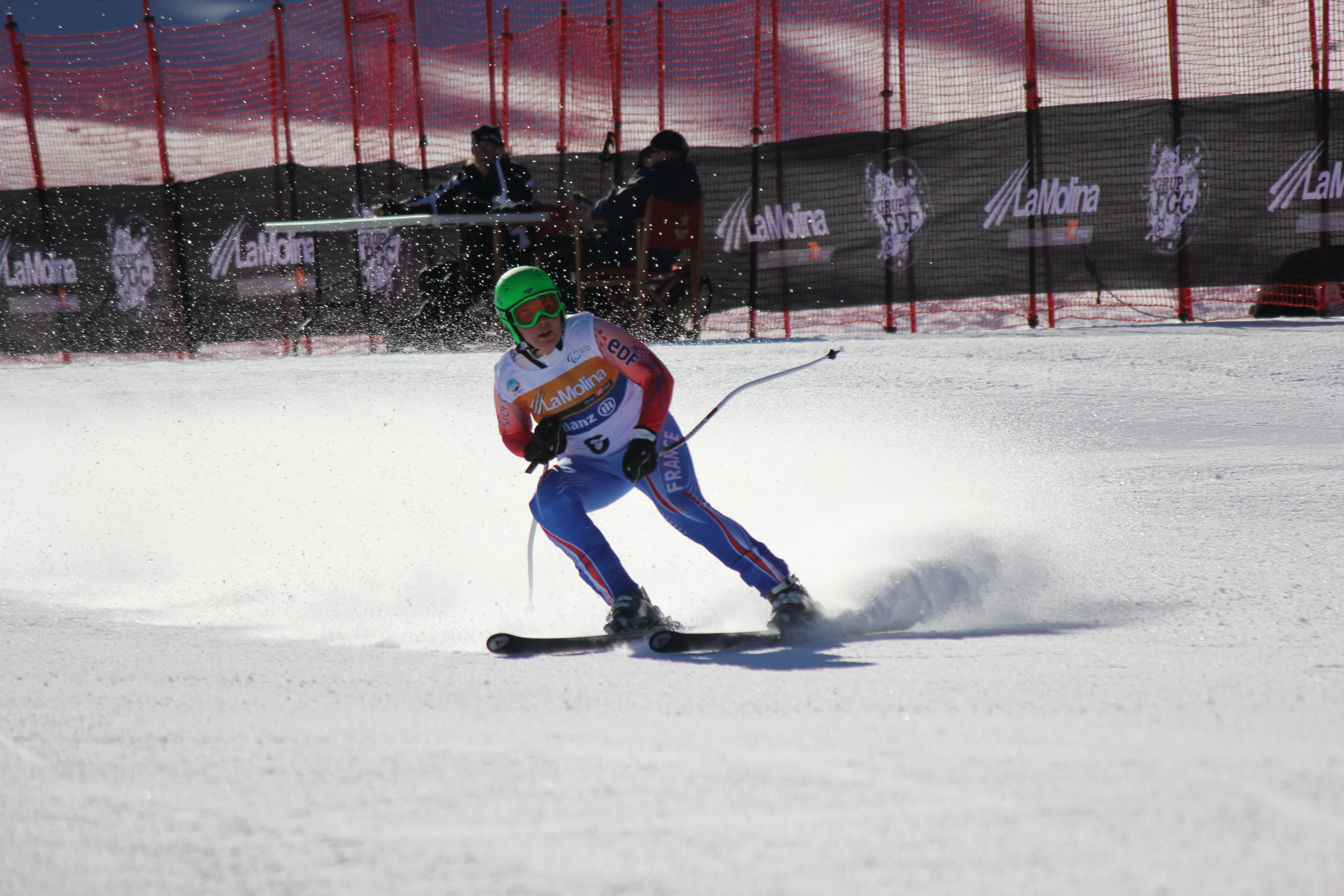
- Jambaqué at the 2013 World Championships

Personal information
- Nationality: French
- Born: 14 April 1988 (age 38) Toulouse, Haute-Garonne, France

Sport
- Country: France
- Sport: alpine skiing
- Event(s): Downhill slalom Giant slalom Super combined Super G
Medal record
Women's para alpine skiing
Representing France
Paralympic Games
| Gold medal – first place | 2006 Turin | Super-G, standing |
| Gold medal – first place | 2006 Turin | Downhill, standing |
| Silver medal – second place | 2006 Turin | Slalom, standing |
| Silver medal – second place | 2010 Vancouver | Downhill, standing |
| Silver medal – second place | 2010 Vancouver | Super combined, standing |
| Silver medal – second place | 2014 Sochi | Super-G, standing |
| Bronze medal – third place | 2006 Turin | Giant slalom, standing |
| Bronze medal – third place | 2014 Sochi | Giant slalom, standing |
World Championships
| Silver medal – second place | 2013 La Molina | Super-G, standing |
| Bronze medal – third place | 2013 La Molina | Downhill, standing |

Solène Jambaqué (born 14 April 1988 in Toulouse) is a French alpine skier and two time Paralympic Champion.

She competed in the 2006 Winter Paralympics in Turin, Italy. She won a gold medal in the super-G and Downhill, a silver medal in Slalom, and a bronze medal in the Giant slalom, standing.

She competed in the 2010 Winter Paralympics in Vancouver, Canada, where she won a silver medal in the Downhill and the Super combined, standing. She became 6th in the Giant slalom, 4th at the super-G and 8th at the Slalom, standing.
