= Ramón Homs =

Personal information
- Nationality: Spanish
- Born: Ramón Homs Miralpeix; 5 March 1974 (age 52) Vic, Barcelona, Spain

Sport
- Country: Spain
- Sport: Para-alpine skiing
- Events: Downhill; Slalom; Giant slalom Super combined Super G
- Club: Club Excursionista Taradell

Ramón Homs Miralpeix (born 5 March 1974) is a Spanish para-alpine LW6/8 classified standing skier. He represented Spain at the 2006 Winter Paralympics where he did not earn a medal. He has also competed at the Spanish national championships, the European Cup and the IPC Alpine Skiing World Cup.

== Personal ==
Homs was born on 5 March 1974 in Vic, Barcelona, with Barcelona being his hometown. He has a physical disability, a left missing arm that he lost in a motorcycle accident. It took him to years to recover physically and mentally from the accident.

== Skiing ==
Homs is a para-alpine LW6/8 classified standing skier, who has an arm amputation and competes in the standing group. He is a member of Club Excursionista Taradell. He has represented the Federación Catalana Minusvalids Fisics (FCMF) in at least one international skiing event.

Homs took up para-alpine skiing two years after his arm was amputated. He competed at a European Cup event in La Molina in early 2006. The event was used as the basis for selecting the Spanish Paralympic team for the 2006 Games. He represented Spain at the 2006 Winter Paralympics. He was disqualified from the slalom event after missing a gate on his first run down the hill. He did not medal in any of his other races. The Games were his first. In 2007, he competed at the Spanish national championships, where he represented the Catalan region of Spain. He won several gold medals at the competition. In February 2007, he competed at a World Cup event in La Molina, Spain. At the 2007 Paralympic Winter World Cup, he finished seventeenth in the overall standings. At the March 2008 Italian National Championships, he finished third in the Super G, fifth in the giant slalom and was disqualified from the slalom. At the last round of the European Cup in March 2008, an event held in La Molina, Spain, he was one of several non-vision impaired Spanish skiers competing at the event. At the first IPC Alpine Skiing World Cup event in the 2008/2009 ski season, he failed to finish one of his races. In January 2009, he participated in a World Cup event in La Molina. He finished seventeenth in the slalom event. At the February 2009 Paralympic World Cup I event, he finished seventeenth overall. In March 2009, he competed at a European Cup event. He finished twelfth overall with 264 points. In April 2009, he competed at the Spanish national championships, where he finished first in the men's standing category. At the January 2010 European Cup, he finished ninth in the Super Combined event.
