= Switzerland at the 2006 Winter Paralympics =

- IPC code: SUI
- NPC: Swiss Paralympic Committee
- Website: www.swissparalympic.ch

in Turin
- Competitors: 21 in 3 sports
- Medals Ranked 13th: Gold 0 Silver 1 Bronze 1 Total 2

Winter Paralympics appearances (overview)
- 1976; 1980; 1984; 1988; 1992; 1994; 1998; 2002; 2006; 2010; 2014; 2018; 2022; 2026

Switzerland participated in the ninth Winter Paralympics in Turin, Italy.

Switzerland entered 21 athletes in the following sports:

- Alpine skiing: 10 male, 1 female
- Nordic skiing: 4 male, 1 female
- Wheelchair curling: 4 male, 1 female

== Medalists ==
Medal	Name	Sport	Event	Date
Silver	Thomas Pfyl	Alpine skiing	Men's slalom, standing	18 March
Bronze	Thomas Pfyl	Alpine skiing	Men's giant slalom, standing	16 March

== See also ==
- 2006 Winter Paralympics
- Switzerland at the 2006 Winter Olympics
