= Chris Williamson (alpine skier) =

Canadian para-alpine skier (born 1972)

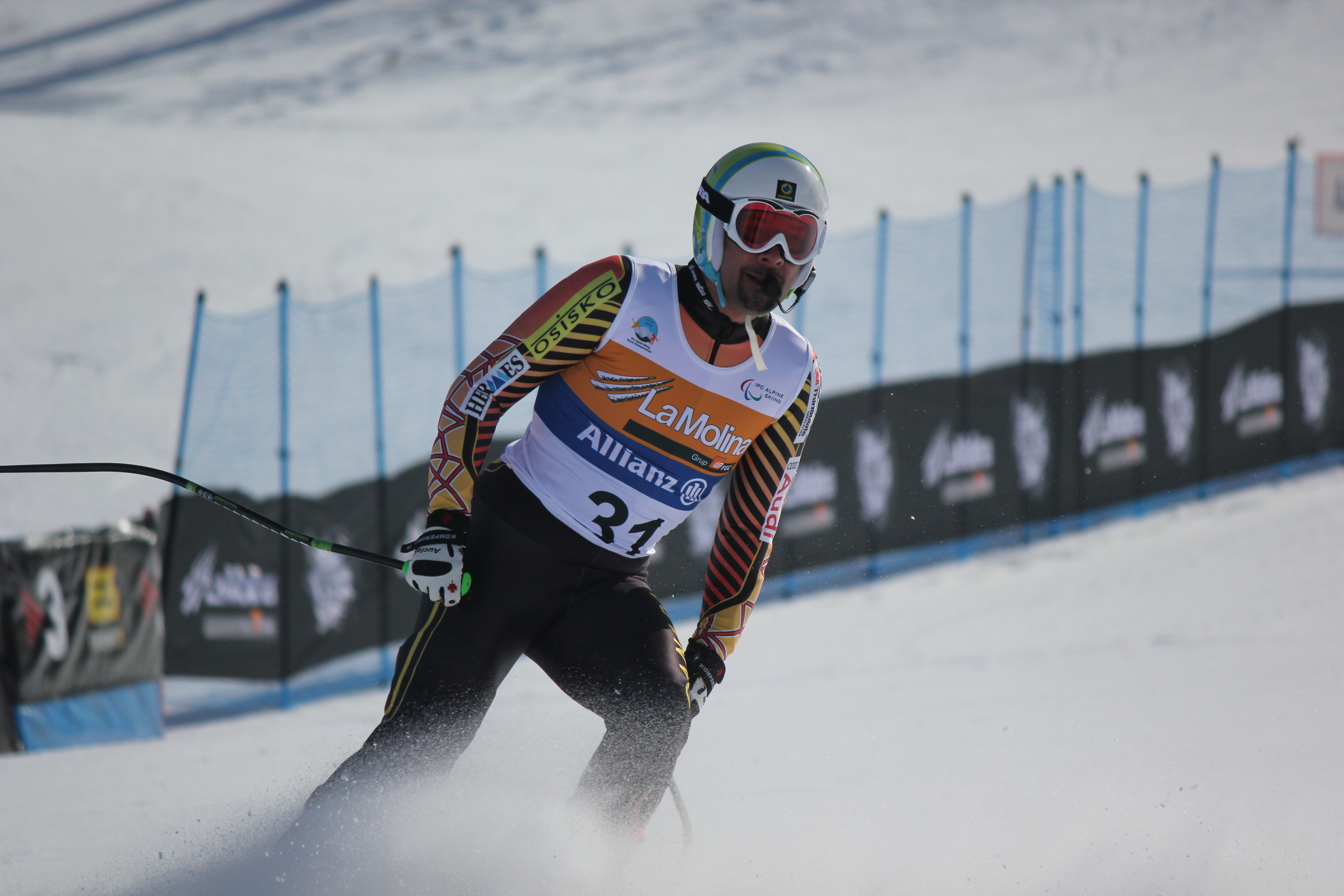
- Williamson at the 2013 IPC World Championships

Personal information
- Born: May 5, 1972 (age 54) Edmonton, Alberta, Canada

Sport
- Country: Canada
- Sport: Alpine skiing
- Event(s): Downhill slalom Giant slalom Super combined Super G
Medal record
Men's para alpine skiing
Representing Canada
Paralympic Games
Gold medal – first place	2002 Salt Lake	Slalom, visually impaired
Silver medal – second place	2006 Torino	Downhill, visually impaired
Bronze medal – third place	2006 Torino	Super-G, visually impaired
Bronze medal – third place	2014 Sochi	Slalom, visually impaired
IPC Alpine Skiing World Championships
Gold medal – first place	2013 La Molina	Super combined, visually impaired
Bronze medal – third place	2013 La Molina	Downhill, visually impaired
Bronze medal – third place	2013 La Molina	Giant slalom, visually impaired

Chris Williamson (born May 5, 1972) is a Canadian alpine skier and Paralympic Champion. His father, Peter, was a speed skater for Canada in the 1968 Winter Olympics and subsequently coached stars such as Mike Ireland and Clara Hughes.

Williamson competed in the 2010 Winter Paralympics in Vancouver, Canada. He became 4th in the Giant slalom, 6th in the Slalom, 4th in the Super combined, visually impaired, and 6th in the Super-G, visually impaired. His sighted guide at Vancouver 2010 and Sochi 2014 was Nick Brush.

== Awards and honours ==
In 2014, Williamson was inducted into the Canadian Disability Hall of Fame.
