= Danja Haslacher =

Austrian para alpine skier

Personal information
- Born: Salzburg, Austria

Sport
- Sport: Alpine skiing
- Disability class: LW2, Standing

Achievements and titles
- Paralympic finals: 1998, 2002, 2006
- World finals: 2004
Medal record
Representing Austria
Winter Paralympic Games
| Gold medal – first place | 1998 Nagano | Super G |
| Gold medal – first place | 1998 Nagano | Giant Slalom |
| Gold medal – first place | 2002 Salt Lake City | Downhill |
| Gold medal – first place | 2002 Salt Lake City | Slalom |
| Gold medal – first place | 2002 Salt Lake City | Giant Slalom |
| Bronze medal – third place | 2006 Turin | Super-G |

Danja Haslacher is an Austrian alpine skier who won five gold medals and one bronze medal at the Paralympic Games between 1998 and 2006. She also claimed victory in the super-G LW2 event at the 2004 IPC Alpine Skiing World Championships.

== Personal life ==
Haslacher has worked as a shop assistant and as a draughtswoman. She had her leg amputated in 1988 at the age of 17 after an accident.

== Career ==
Haslacher started skiing in 1994. At the 1998 Winter Paralympics, Haslacher won the super-G and giant slalom LW2 events. At the 2002 Winter Paralympics, she won the Downhill, slalom and giant slalom LW2 events. In 2004, Haslacher won the IPC Alpine Skiing World Championships super-G LW2 event. At the 2006 Winter Paralympics, Haslacher was the Austrian flag bearer at the Opening Ceremony. At the Games, she came third in the Super-G standing event and fifth in the downhill standing event. Haslacher competed at the 2009 IPC Alpine Skiing World Championships in Pyeongchang, South Korea. In the same year, Haslacher fractured her leg in four places and required a long period of rehabilitation. She came second in the standing event at the 2011–12 FIS Alpine Ski Europa Cup.

Haslacher was unable to compete at the 2014 Winter Paralympics in Sochi, Russia, due to a tibia injury. In March 2014, she retired from skiing.

== Honours ==
In 2002, Haslacher was named Austrian Disabled Sportsperson of the Year.
