= Nicolas Berejny =

French para-alpine skier (born 1968)

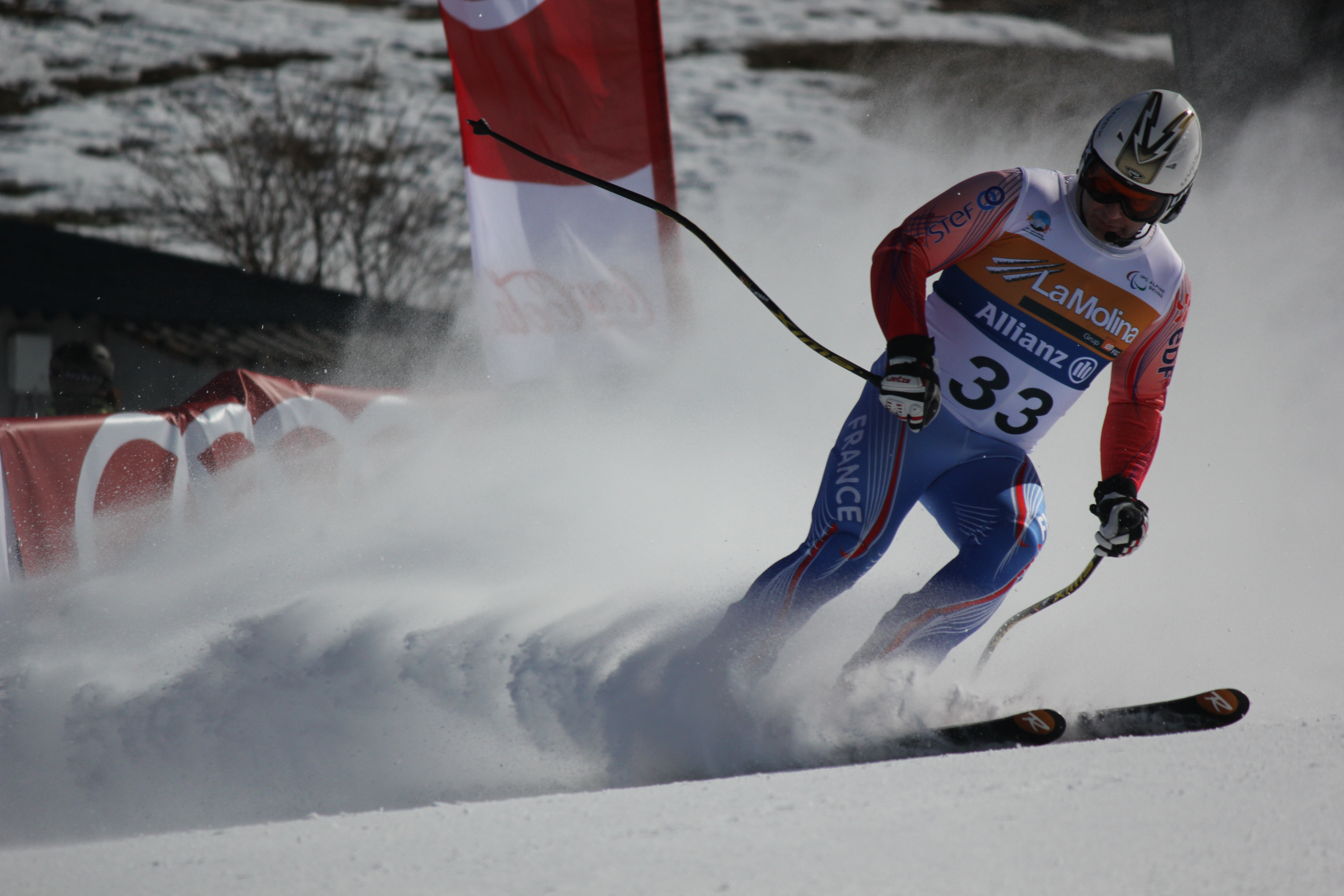

Personal information
- Nationality: French
- Born: 27 June 1968 (age 58) Condom, Gers, France

Sport
- Country: France
- Sport: alpine skiing
- Event(s): Downhill slalom Giant slalom Super combined Super G
- Coached by: Leina Doo
Medal record
Men's para alpine skiing
Representing France
Paralympic Games
Gold medal – first place	2006 Turin	Slalom, visually impaired
Gold medal – first place	2006 Turin	Giant slalom, visually impaired
Gold medal – first place	2010 Vancouver	Super-G, visually impaired
Bronze medal – third place	2006 Turin	Downhill, visually impaired

Nicolas Berejny (born 27 June 1968) is a French alpine skier and 3-time Paralympic Champion.

He competed in the 2006 Winter Paralympics in Turin, Italy. He won a gold medal in the Slalom and the Giant slalom, visually impaired, and a bronze medal in the Downhill, visually impaired.

At the 2010 Winter Paralympics in Vancouver, Canada, he won a gold medal in the Super-G, visually impaired.

His sighted guide at Turin 2006 and Vancouver 2010 was Sophie Troc.
