= Walter Lackner =

Austrian para-alpine skier

Sport
- Country: Austria
- Sport: Para-alpine skiing
Medal record
Paralympic Games
| Gold medal – first place | 2006 Turin | Super-G Standing |
| Bronze medal – third place | 2006 Turin | Downhill Standing |

Walter Lackner is an Austrian para-alpine skier. He represented Austria at the 2002 Winter Paralympics and at the 2006 Winter Paralympics.

In 2006, he won the gold medal in the men's super-G standing event and the bronze medal in the men's downhill standing event.

He also finished in 3rd place in Men's Standing at the 2007 IPC Alpine Skiing World Cup.

== See also ==
- List of Paralympic medalists in alpine skiing
