= Sophie Troc =

French Paralympic alpine skier

Personal information
- Nationality: French
- Born: France

Sport
- Country: France
- Sport: Alpine skiing
- Event(s): Downhill slalom Giant slalom Super combined Super G
- Coached by: Leina Doo
Medal record
Guide for men's alpine skiing
Representing France
Paralympic Games
| Gold medal – first place | 2006 Turin | Slalom, visually impaired |
| Gold medal – first place | 2006 Turin | Giant slalom, visually impaired |
| Gold medal – first place | 2010 Vancouver | Super-G, visually impaired |
| Bronze medal – third place | 2006 Turin | Downhill, visually impaired |

Sophie Troc is a French alpine skier, sighted guide and 3-time Paralympic Champion.

She was Nicolas Berejny's sighted guide at Turin 2006 and Vancouver 2010.

They competed in the 2006 Winter Paralympics in Turin, Italy, and won gold in the Slalom and the Giant slalom, visually impaired, and bronze in the Downhill, visually impaired.

At the 2010 Winter Paralympics in Vancouver, British Columbia, Canada, Troc and Berejny won gold in the Super-G, visually impaired.
