= Klaus Salzmann =

Austrian para-alpine skier

Sport
- Country: Austria
- Sport: Para-alpine skiing; Wheelchair tennis
Medal record
Paralympic Games
Bronze medal – third place	1998 Nagano	Giant Slalom LW11

Klaus Salzmann is an Austrian para-alpine skier and wheelchair tennis player. He won the gold medal in the Men's Giant Slalom LW11 event in alpine skiing at the 1998 Winter Paralympics. He also represented Austria at the 1994 Winter Paralympics and at the 2006 Winter Paralympics. He also competed in wheelchair tennis at the 1996 Summer Paralympics.

== See also ==
- List of Paralympic medalists in alpine skiing
