= Sabine Gasteiger =

Austrian para-alpine skier (born 1956)

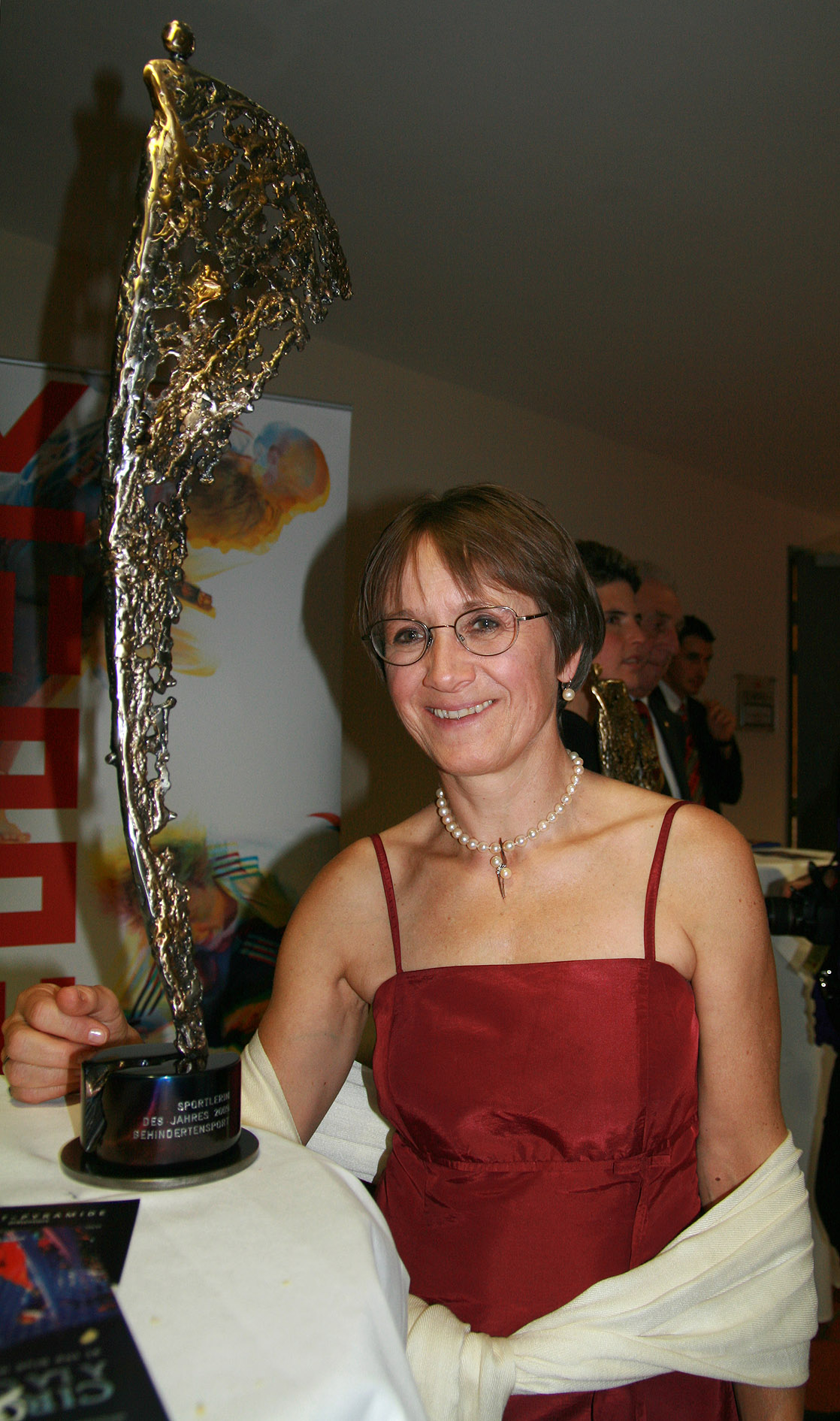
- Gasteiger taking the 2009 Disabled Athlete of the year

Personal information
- Nationality: Austrian
- Born: October 28, 1956 (age 69)

Sport
- Country: Austria
- Sport: Para-alpine skiing
- Event(s): Downhill; Slalom; Giant slalom Super combined Super-G
Medal record
Women's Para-alpine skiing
Representing Austria
Winter Paralympics
Silver medal – second place	2006 Turin	Downhill, visually imparied
Gold medal – first place	2006 Turin	Super-G, visually impaired
Bronze medal – third place	2006 Turin	Giant slalom, visually impaired
Silver medal – second place	2006 Turin	Slalom, visually impaired
Silver medal – second place	2010 Vancouver	Giant slalom, visually impaired
Gold medal – first place	2010 Vancouver	Slalom, visually impaired

Sabine Gasteiger (born 28 October 1956) is an Austrian Paralympic gold medallist. She was awarded a gold medal in 2006, as part of her Decoration of Honour for Services to the Republic of Austria.

== Life ==
Gasteiger was born in 1956. She has very poor eyesight and she therefore competes as a paralympian. She skis for the Austrian national team.

She won a gold medal, two bronze and a silver at the 2006 Winter Paralympics in Turin.

She has two silver medals at the 2010 Winter Paralympics in Vancouver. She won the second silver medal in the women's giant slalom, visually impaired. She was the 2009 Austrian disabled sportsperson of the year.

== Personal life ==
Gasteiger is married to Emil who is also her companion as at 2007.
