= Hungary at the 2006 Winter Paralympics =

- IPC code: HUN
- NPC: Hungarian Paralympic Committee
- Website: www.hparalimpia.hu

in Turin
- Competitors: 2 in 1 sport
- Medals Ranked 20th: Gold 0 Silver 0 Bronze 0 Total 0

Winter Paralympics appearances (overview)
- 2002; 2006; 2010; 2014; 2018; 2022; 2026

Hungary participated in the ninth Winter Paralympics in Turin, Italy.

Hungary entered two athletes in the following sports:

- Alpine skiing: 1 male, 1 female

== Medalists ==
	(gold)	(silver)	(bronze)	Total
Hungary	0	0	0	0

== See also ==
- 2006 Winter Paralympics
- Hungary at the 2006 Winter Olympics
