= George Sansonetis =

American para-alpine skier

Sport
- Country: United States
- Sport: Alpine skiing
Medal record
Paralympic Games
Silver medal – second place	1998 Nagano	Giant Slalom LW9
Bronze medal – third place	1998 Nagano	Super-G LW9

George Sansonetis is an American para-alpine skier. He represented the United States at four Winter Paralympics: in 1998, 2002, 2006 and 2010.

In 1998, he won the silver medal in the Men's Giant Slalom LW9 event and the bronze medal in the Men's Super-G LW9 event.
