= Tyler Walker (skier) =

American para-alpine skier

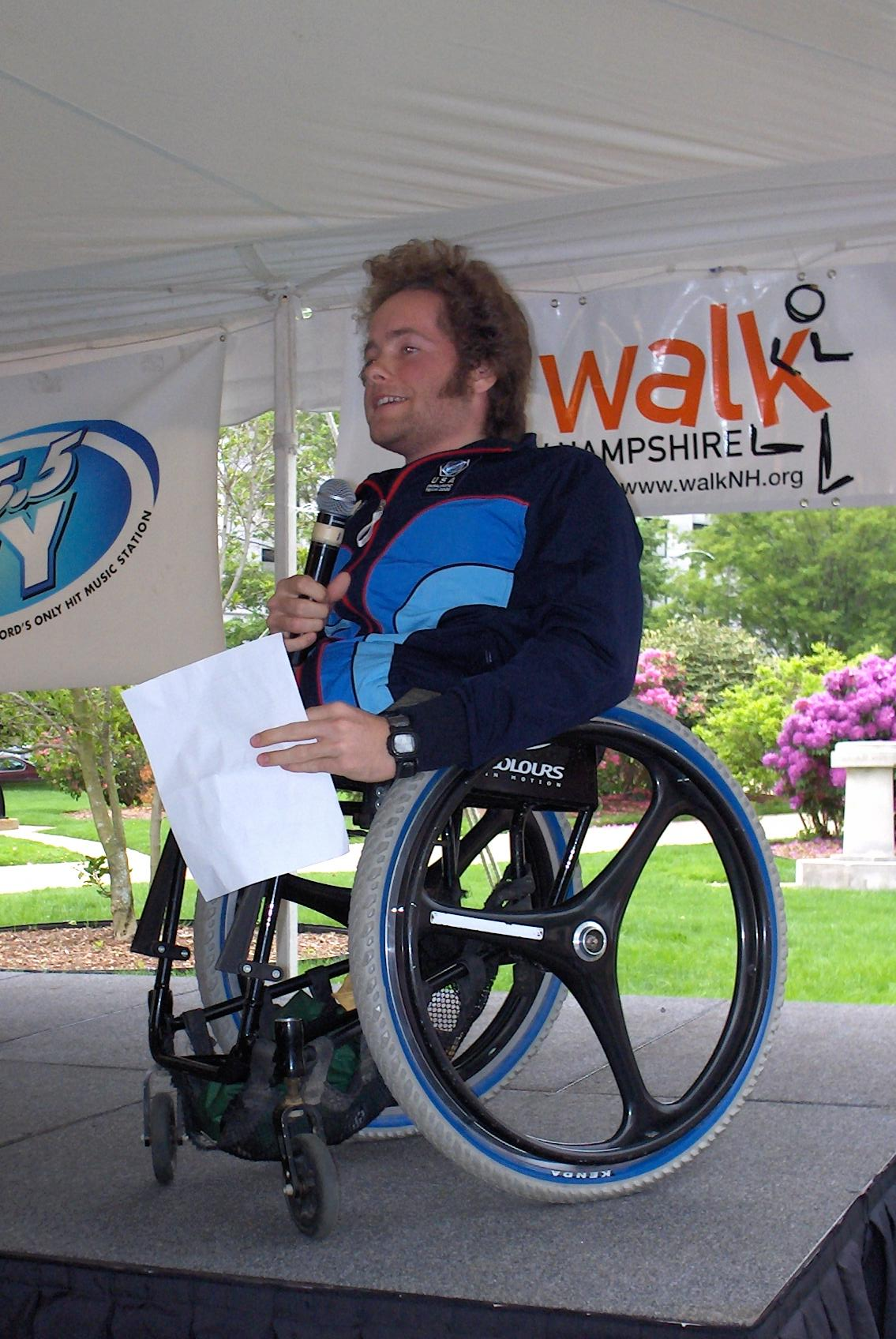

Personal information
- Born: April 10, 1986 (age 40) Franconia, New Hampshire, U.S.
Medal record
Men's para-alpine skiing
Representing United States
Winter Paralympics
Silver medal – second place	2018 Pyeongchang	Slalom, sitting
Silver medal – second place	2018 Pyeongchang	Giant slalom, sitting

Tyler Walker (born April 10, 1986) is a sit-skier with lumbar sacral agenesis. He competed for the United States at the 2014 Winter Paralympics where a crash caused him to not finish. During the 2018 Winter Paralympics he won two silver medals.
