= Anna Kulíšková =

Czech para-alpine skier (born 1986)

Anna Pešková
Personal information
- National team: Czech Republic
- Born: Anna Kulíšková; 9 March 1986 (age 40) Plzeň, Czechoslovakia
- Education: Charles University

Sport
- Country: Czech Republic
- Sport: Alpine skiing
- Disability: Tunnel vision
- Disability class: Visually impaired
Medal record
Women's para-alpine skiing
Representing Czech Republic
Paralympic Games
Silver medal – second place	2006 Turin	Visually impaired Super-G
Bronze medal – third place	2010 Vancouver	Visually impaired Super-G

Anna Pešková (née Kulíšková, born 9 March 1986) is a Czech para-alpine skier, who competes in the visual impairment disability class. She won a silver and a bronze medal in the Super-G events at the 2006 and 2010 Winter Paralympics, respectively.

== Career ==
Kulíšková has experienced visual impairment from birth, with her only able to see a four degrees through tunnel vision. She later explained that this limited ability to see means that she could read books and enable her to study. While as a child, she competed in a variety of sports at the national Sports Games of Visually Impaired Youth. Following this she took up cross-country skiing, and then para-alpine skiing after discovering that downhill skiing was a possibility.

She first competed at the Winter Paralympics in the 2006 at Turin, Italy. She placed second in the Super-G, winning the silver medal. She also competed in the giant slalom, where she finished in fourth position outside of the podium places. Kulíšková competed once again at the Paralympics at the 2010 Games in Vancouver, Canada. This time she won the bronze medal in the super-G competition for visually impaired athletes. It was the only medal won by an athlete from the Czech Republic at the 2010 Winter Paralympics.

After graduating with a bachelor's degree from the Faculty of Social Sciences at Charles University in Prague, Kulíšková moved to Vancouver. She found getting accommodation difficult, as she needed to live somewhere that would allow her to keep a guide dog. While there, she undertook lessons to improve her understanding of the English language. Outside of sports, she was seeking a career in journalism.

After returning from Canada, she got married and in 2016 gave birth to twin babies. Then she came back to alpine skiing. She participated at the 2018 Paralympics in Pyeongchang, where she stood 11th in super-G and did not finish two other races.
