= Scott Adams (skier) =

Australian Paralympic skier (born 1971)

Scott Adams (born 17 March 1971 in Sydney) is an Australian Paralympic skier. He was from Toongabbie and lives in Kimberley, British Columbia, Canada. He is a below-knee amputee (LW4 classification).

At the 2002 Winter Paralympics, he competed in four events – 12th in the Men's Downhill LW4, 9th in the Men's Slalom LW4 and did not finish in the Men's Giant Slalom LW4 and Men's Super-G LW4. At the 2006 Winter Paralympics, he competed in four events – 40th in the Men's Downhill standing, 40th in the Men's Giant Slalom standing, 38th Men's Slalom standing and 46th in the Men's Super-G standing.
