= Stanislav Loska =

Czech alpine skier (born 1968)

Personal information
- Born: 21 June 1968 (age 58) Ostrava, Czech Republic

Sport
- Sport: Para alpine skiing
- Disability class: LW6/8
Medal record
Paralympic Games
Bronze medal – third place	1994 Lillehammer	Slalom LW6/8

Stanislav Loska (Czech pronunciation: [ˈstaɲɪslav ˈloska]; born 21 June 1968) is a veteran on the Czech paralympic team, competing in alpine skiing. The 2010 Winter Paralympics in Vancouver were his fifth Paralympic Games. At the 1994 Winter Paralympics in Lillehammer he won the bronze medal in slalom. He won the same medal in the world championship in Lech in Austria. At the 1998 Winter Paralympics in Nagano he placed fourth and fifth. In the world championships in Anzère he won the bronze medal in the slalom and an invitation to the 2002 Winter Paralympic Games in Salt Lake City.

Stanislav Loska was born in Ostrava. He learned to ski as soon as he could stand. His coming ski career broke an accident in 1988. He studied in Brno the Faculty of Civil Engineering of the Brno University of Technology. He used to come back home by train through Přerov, where he had to wait until the locomotive was changed. One day it was changed earlier and Loska almost missed the train. He tried to jump into the accelerating train, but he fell under it and lost his left arm.
