= Gianmaria Dal Maistro =

Italian para-alpine skier (born 1980)

Personal information
- National team: Italy
- Born: 4 December 1980 (age 45) Schio, Italy
- Height: 1.70 m (5 ft 7 in)
- Weight: 71 kg (157 lb)

Sport
- Sport: Para-alpine skiing
- Disability class: B3
- Club: Fiamme Azzurre
Medal record
Event	1st	2nd	3rd
Paralympic Games	1	5	3
World Championships	0	2	3
Total	1	7	6

Gianmaria Dal Maistro (born 4 December 1980) is a visually impaired Italian male paralympic alpine skier who won medals at the Paralympic Games. He lit the cauldron of the 2026 Winter Paralympics in Milan.
