= Shannon Dallas =

Australian sit skier

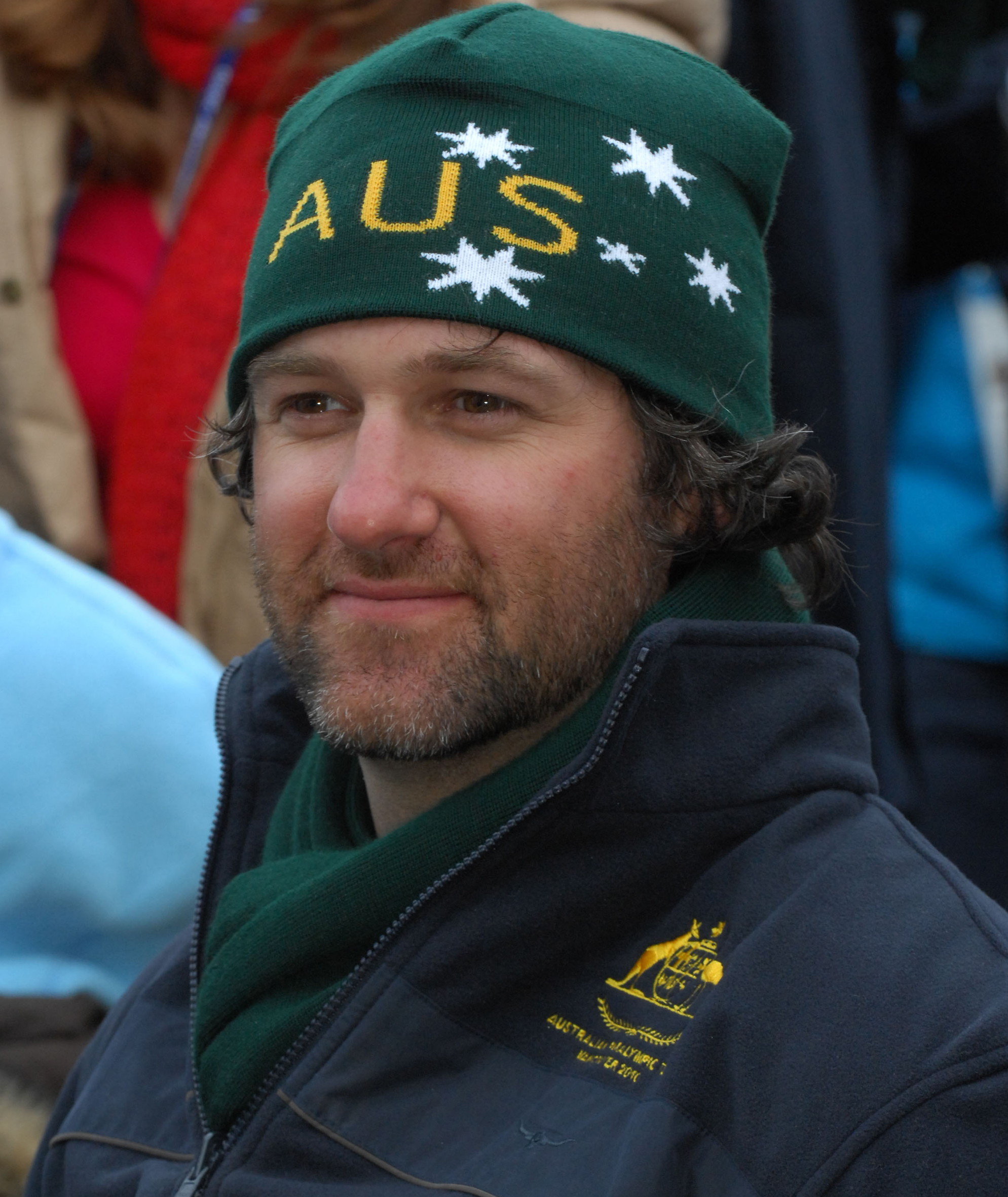
- Shannon Dallas prior to the Vancouver 2010 Paralympic Games.

Personal information
- Nationality: Australia
- Born: 16 August 1977 (age 49)

Sport
- Country: Australia
- Sport: Para-alpine skiing
- Events: Downhill; Super-G; Giant slalom Slalom; Super combined

Achievements and titles
- Paralympic finals: 2010 Winter Paralympics
Medal record
Alpine skiing
IPC Alpine Skiing World Championships
Gold medal – first place	2009 High 1 Resort, Korea	Super G Sitting

Shannon Dallas (born 16 August 1977) is an Australian sit skier who receives support from the New South Wales Institute of Sport. Dallas participated in the 2006 Winter Paralympics in Turin, Italy, and the 2010 Winter Paralympics in Vancouver, Canada.

== Personal ==
Born on 16 August 1977, Dallas was a carpenter prior to an accident in 2000 where he broke his back after falling through a roof. He also used to be a surfie. When he was young, he moved around a lot. After finishing his HSC, he moved to Toongabbie where he lived with a friend in a loungeroom. Dallas is from Terrigal, New South Wales. He moved there in around 2003.

Dallas does work as a public speaker. In 2010, he spoke at the Concord Library about his experiences with disability sport. That same year, he also spoke at Delfin Lend Lease about workplace safety.

In 2009 and 2010, Dallas worked in wheelchair basketball development on New South Wales's central coast. He also worked as a newspaper columnist. In 2010, he played wheelchair basketball for the Sydney University Wheelkings. He had four relationships in four years in the lead up to the 2010 Winter Paralympics. The demands of high level skiing was a factor in the relationships not working. In 2009, he had a shoulder reconstruction, and other rehabilitation at the Mount Wilga Rehabilitation Hospital. He also dealt with necrotising fasciitis, a flesh-eating bug, that sidelined him for seven months. The flesh-eating bug treatment involved a skin graft.

Dallas was featured on the Australian Broadcasting Corporation's X Paralympic Games in March 2010.

== Skiing ==
Dallas is a sit-skier. When skiing, he can go 100 kilometres (62 mi) an hour. He receives support from the New South Wales Institute of Sport, the Australian Institute of Sport and the Australian Government Sports Training Grants program. In 2003, he competed at the Hartford Ski Spectacular. During the 2005/2006 World Cup skiing season, he had a second and third place finish in the giant slalom events.

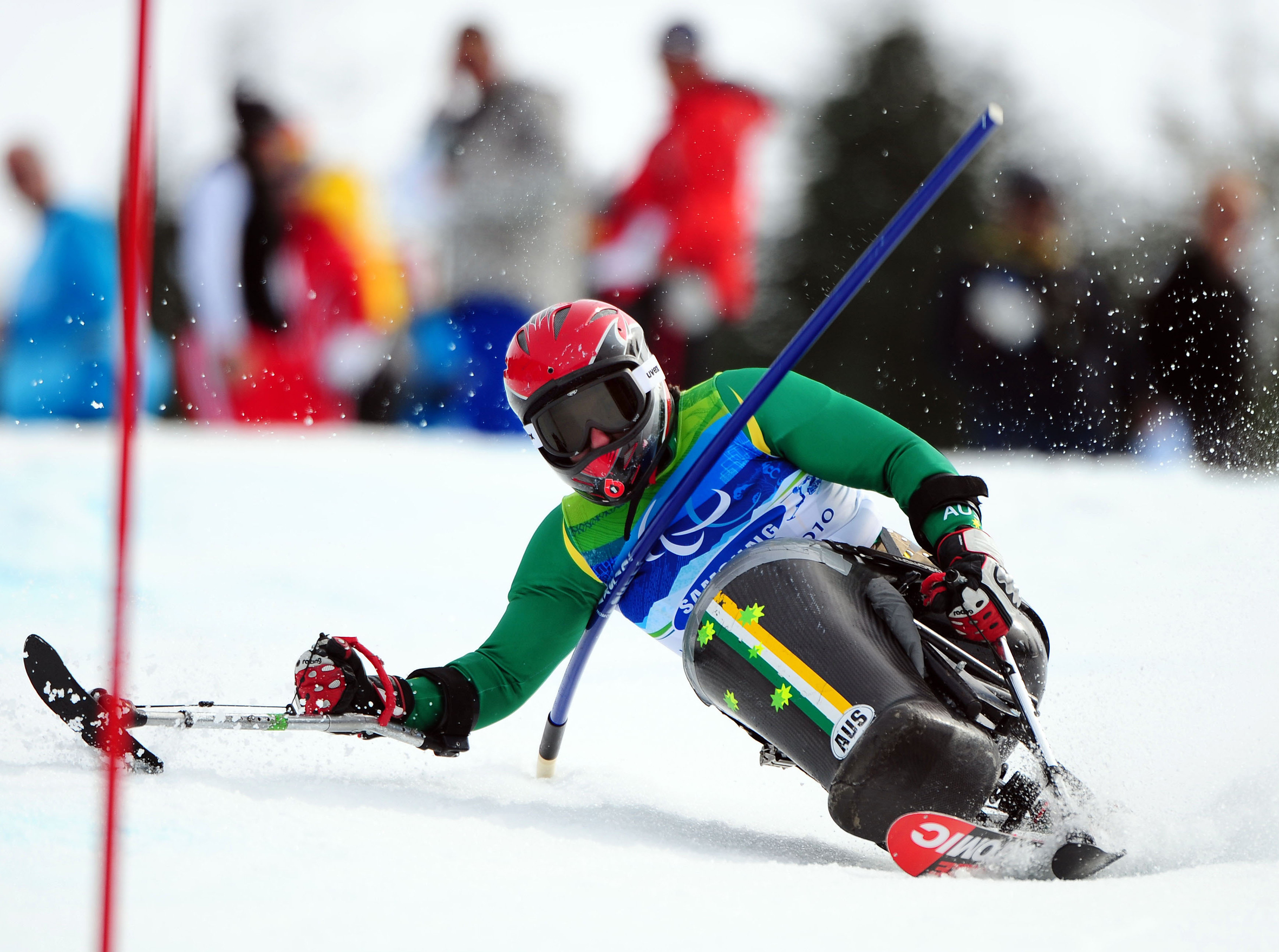
Shannon Dallas competing in the slalom event at the Vancouver 2010 Paralympic Games.

Dallas competed at the 2006 Winter Paralympics, where he was the team captain. Coming into the Games, he was ranked in the top five in the world in the downhill and super-G. While in Turin, his grandmother died. He finished ninth in the super-G and crashed in the downhill. Following his first run in the giant slalom, he was 34th with a time of 1:07.90. He climbed back to finish 18th overall in the giant slalom following his second run which had a time of 57.32 seconds. He withdrew from the Games before the slalom event, his last scheduled one.

In 2007, Dallas won a World Cup. In 2009, he won the World Championships for the super-G. He had a high speed crash at the 2009 IPC Alpine Skiing World Championships in Korea in the downhill event, which resulted in severe injuries that doctors thought might end his career.

Dallas was officially named to the Australian 2010 Winter Paralympics team in November 2009. A ceremony was held in Canberra with Australian Paralympic Committee president Greg Hartung and Minister for Sport Kate Ellis making the announcement. He and the rest of Australia's para-alpine team arrived in the Paralympic village on 9 March 2010. At the Games, he competed in the super-G event, when he was the super-G world champion at the time. In the super-G, he finished 12th. He also competed in the super combined, downhill and giant slalom events. He did not place in the super combined event as he failed to finish his second run because he crashed. He had been sitting in the sixth spot after his first run and kept sixth spot after his second run. He finished 11th in the super-G. He finished ninth in the super combined. He did not finish in the slalom. He overskied the giant slalom and finished sixth. The giant slalom course was difficult, and Dallas was one of only 30 out of 54 skiers to finish the course. Following the 2010 Winter Olympic Games, Dallas took a break from the sport, and had originally planned as a retirement that he announced before the 2010 Games.
