= Gerd Gradwohl =

German para-alpine skier (born 1960)

Gerd Gradwohl (born 16 January 1960 in Kempten) is a visually impaired alpine skier from Germany. He won a gold medal and a bronze medal in Alpine skiing at the 2006 Winter Paralympics. He was disqualified for a gold medal due to a rules violation concerning distance from his guide
