= Slovakia at the 2006 Winter Paralympics =

- IPC code: SVK
- NPC: Slovak Paralympic Committee
- Website: www.spv.sk

in Turin
- Competitors: 35 in 2 sports
- Medals Ranked 13th: Gold 0 Silver 1 Bronze 1 Total 2

Winter Paralympics appearances (overview)
- 1994; 1998; 2002; 2006; 2010; 2014; 2018; 2022; 2026

Other related appearances
- Czechoslovakia (1976–1992)

Slovakia participated in the ninth Winter Paralympics in Turin, Italy.

Slovakia entered 35 athletes in the following sports:

- Alpine skiing: 11 male, 4 female
- Nordic skiing: 2 male

== Medalists ==
Medal	Name	Sport	Event
Silver	Radomir Dudas; Guide: Maros Hudik	Alpine skiing	Men's Super-G visually impaired
Bronze	Iveta Chlebakova	Alpine skiing	Women's Downhill standing

== See also ==
- 2006 Winter Paralympics
- Slovakia at the 2006 Winter Olympics
