= Spain at the 2010 Winter Paralympics =

- IPC code: ESP
- NPC: Spanish Paralympic Committee
- Website: www.paralimpicos.es (in Spanish)

in Vancouver, British Columbia, Canada
- Competitors: 5 in 1 sport
- Medals Ranked 13th: Gold 1 Silver 2 Bronze 0 Total 3

Winter Paralympics appearances (overview)
- 1984; 1988; 1992; 1994; 1998; 2002; 2006; 2010; 2014; 2018; 2022; 2026

Spain sent 5 competitors to compete in one discipline at the 2010 Winter Paralympics in Vancouver, British Columbia, Canada.

== Medalists ==
The following Spanish athletes won medals at the Games.

Medal	Name	Sport	Event	Date
Gold	Jon Santacana; Guide: Miguel Galindo	Alpine skiing	Men's downhill, visually impaired	March 18
Silver	Jon Santacana; Guide: Miguel Galindo	Alpine skiing	Men's slalom, visually impaired	March 14
Silver	Jon Santacana; Guide: Miguel Galindo	Alpine skiing	Men's giant slalom, visually impaired	March 16

== Alpine skiing ==
Women

Athlete	Event	Run 1			Run 2			Total		
Athlete	Event	Time	Diff	Rank	Time	Diff	Rank	Time	Diff	Rank
Anna Cohí	Slalom visually impaired	1:17.90	+22.00	11	1:06.42	+1.76	4	2:24.32	+23.76	9
Anna Cohí	Giant slalom visually impaired	1:37.12	+11.68	5	1:38.54	+7.33	5	3:15.66	+19.01	5
Anna Cohí	Downhill visually impaired							1:45.94	+18.43	7
Anna Cohí	Super-G visually impaired							1:46.12	+12.31	6
Anna Cohí	Super combined visually impaired	1:50.51	+15.25	5	1:01.34	+1.99	3	2:51.85	+17.24	4
Úrsula Pueyo	Slalom standing	DNF								n/a
Úrsula Pueyo	Giant slalom standing	DSQ								n/a

Men

Athlete	Event	Run 1			Run 2			Total		
Athlete	Event	Time	Diff	Rank	Time	Diff	Rank	Time	Diff	Rank
Andrés Boira	Slalom visually impaired	54.17	+4.29	11	1:00.61	+5.20	7	1:54.78	+8.96	7
Andrés Boira	Giant slalom visually impaired	1:32.19	+12.82	16	1:36.61	+15.18	12	3:08.80	+26.81	12
Andrés Boira	Super-G visually impaired							1:36.71	+15.16	15
Andrés Boira	Super combined visually impaired	1:40.70	+16.85	11	53.61	+3.14	8	2:34.31	+19.70	9
Gabriel Gorce	Slalom visually impaired	52.10	+2.22	6	DSQ					n/a
Gabriel Gorce	Giant slalom visually impaired	1:28.18	+8.81	11	1:33.51	+11.08	9	3:01.69	+19.70	10
Gabriel Gorce	Downhill visually impaired							DSQ		n/a
Gabriel Gorce	Super-G visually impaired							1:35.40	+13.85	14
Gabriel Gorce	Super combined visually impaired	1:28.86	+5.01	8	55.18	+4.71	9	2:24.04	+9.43	8
Jon Santacana; Guide: Miguel Galindo	Slalom visually impaired	49.88	0.00	1	57.03	+1.62	3	1:46.91	+1.09	2nd place, silver medalist(s)
Jon Santacana; Guide: Miguel Galindo	Giant slalom visually impaired	1:19.77	+0.40	2	1:22.43	0.00	1	2:42.20	+0.21	2nd place, silver medalist(s)
Jon Santacana; Guide: Miguel Galindo	Downhill visually impaired							1:18.23	0.00	1st place, gold medalist(s)
Jon Santacana; Guide: Miguel Galindo	Super-G visually impaired							1:23.21	+1.66	5
Jon Santacana; Guide: Miguel Galindo	Super combined visually impaired	1:24.87	+1.02	3	DNF					n/a

== See also ==
- Spain at the 2010 Winter Olympics
