= Disabled sports in Spain =

Disabled sports in Spain started in the 1910s with the emergence of deaf sport. Blind sport began in the 1930s. Sport for people with physical disabilities began in the 1950s, and was primarily rehabilitative. The first major organization for disabled sports was created in 1968 at the direction of then president of the Spanish Olympic Committee Juan Antonio Samaranch. Spain competed at its first Paralympic Games that same year. ONCE became the official organization for organizing Spanish representation in international blind sport competitions in 1986. Spanish sport was restructured because of changes in law during the early 1990s, resulting in the creation of four new disability sport organizations and the Spanish Paralympic Committee. During the 1990s and 2000s, funding opportunities for disabled sports improved.

== History ==
=== Pre-Paralympic Movement ===
The first deaf sports club was created in Spain in 1917 when Deaf Sports Circle of Barcelona was formed. It was not until 1949 that the Spanish Committee of Silent Sports was created; Marcos Anavi Benavideste was the group's first president, a position he would stay in for ten years.

Blind sports were being organized in schools for the blind in Spain by 1938. Early sports blind children participated in included chess, swimming and athletics. Competitive blind sport started by 1958 at Colegio Inmaculada Concepción de Madrid when an organized race took place between visually impaired and sighted students.

During the 1950s, the Spanish Red Cross was involved in organizing disabled sports opportunities in the country, including organizing the first Olimpiadas de la Esperanza held in Tarragona. In 1956, the Hogares Mundet was created as a residential facility for children with physical disabilities who had no parents. A key part of care was the integration of sport.

In 1960, Spanish Committee of Silent Sports joined the International Committee of Sports for the Deaf. A year later, in 1961, Spain sent its first delegation to the Deaflympics. The first national deaf sport championship was held in the 1960s. Initially, the competition had only two sports on the program, chess and football.

Early disabled sports for physically disabled people practiced in Spain during this period included wheelchair basketball, wheelchair tennis, boccia and archery. Much of it was focused around large hospitals.

=== Early Paralympic Movement ===
As a result of the increase in participation and interest in sport for people with physical disabilities, then president of the Spanish Olympic Committee Juan Antonio Samaranch charged Guillermo Cabezas to create the Spanish Sports Federation for the Physically Disabled (FEDDF), which was done in 1968. While originally created only for people with physical disabilities, it soon became a catchall organization representing multiple disability types. During the 1960s, FEDDF then known as FEDM lacked funding. A number of public institutions were indifferent to needs of sportspeople with disabilities, did not understand what role the organization should play and, consequently, they provided little assistance. Many disabled sportspeople at the time had to fund their own activities. Key people involved in pioneering disabled sports during the 1960s included Diego Monreal, Mary Tamayo, Lojo Jaramillo, Juan Peris, Jose Barbero, Olga Martinez, Juan Palau, Jesus Maza, Antonio Marco, Isabel de Cubas, J. Antonio Jiménez, Gaspar Anaya, and Alfonso Otero.

Spain sent its first delegation to compete at the Paralympic Games in 1968.

Wheelchair basketball was first played in Spain in 1969. During the 1970s, wheelchair basketball began developing in the country. Its organizers offered a model of success that was then duplicated in other Spanish sports including swimming and skiing.

When sport for people physical disabilities really began in Spain during the 1970s, it was intended to aid in patient rehabilitation. By the early 2000, disabled sports has evolved and become a competitive thing.

The first international contact between Spain's blind sport community and the international community took place in 1970 in France. In 1972, the first National Sports Championships for the Physically Disabled (Spanish: Juegos Nacionales Minusválidos) were held. Spain sent a 30-member strong delegation to the 1972 Summer Paralympics. In 1973, the program for the national deaf sports championships expanded to include basketball, tennis, table tennis, and bowls.

For the 1976 Summer Paralympics, blind sports were introduced on the Paralympic programme. A Special Olympics was first held in the country in Madrid in 1978. Spain sent its first delegation to the Winter Deaflympics in 1983.

During the 1970s and early 1980s, FEDDF was dominated by people with physical disabilities and other disabilities types like vision impairment did not get as much support inside the organization. This served to push for the creation of ONCE to promote blind sport. In 1986, ONCE became the official organization for organizing Spanish representation in international blind sport competitions. It would continue in this role until the conclusion of the 1994 blind sport world championships held in Berlin.

In 1991, the Catalan Tennis Federation began to work on integrating wheelchair tennis into its organization. By 1995, the Royal Spanish Tennis Federation and International Tennis Federation also began working on integration. FEDDF built wheelchair tennis into the organization based on these examples of integration attempts. The partnership between the Royal Spanish Tennis Federation and FEDMF provided additional funding and competition opportunities for FEDMF wheelchair tennis players.

=== Barcelona and Post Barcelona ===
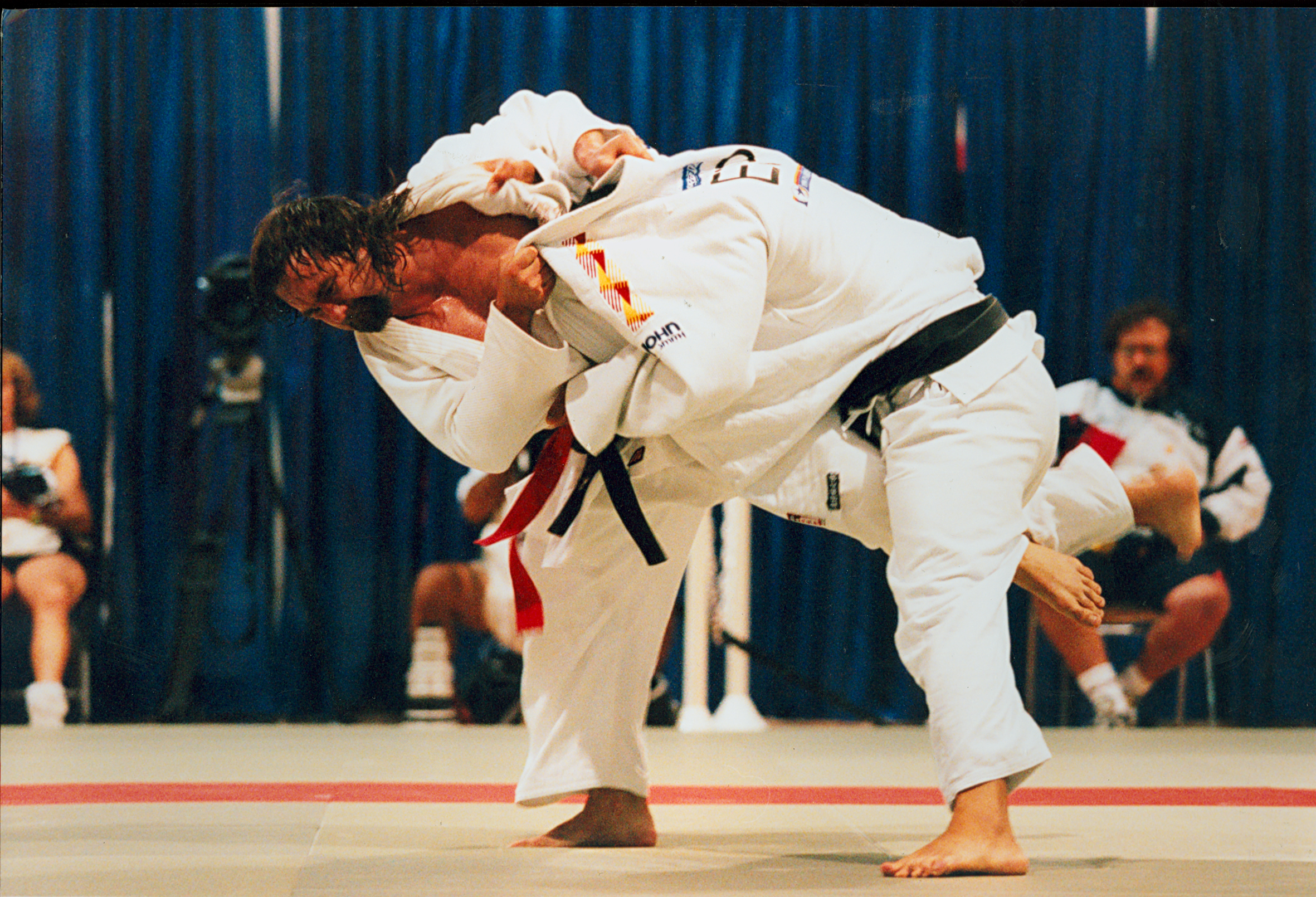
A Spanish judo competitor at the 1996 Summer Paralympics

In 1990, the General Law of Sports was passed, (Spanish: Ley General del Deporte) which led to changes in how sport was organized inside Spain. Eventually, changes in response to the law assisted in creating a landscape that resulted in the creation of several national Spanish disabled sports organizations for specific disability types. This included the creation of Spanish Federation of Sports for the Blind, Spanish Federation of Sportspeople with Intellectual Disabilities, Spanish Federation of Sports for the Deaf and Spanish Federation of Sportspeople with Cerebral Palsy. The law meant that while these sport organizations are private ones, they serve a public interest.

When Barcelona hosted the 1992 Summer Paralympics, this edition turned a defining moment for disabled sports in Spain and the world. It ended up assisting the definition of Spanish sport organizations connected to people with disabilities. Following the entire administrative process of reorganization of world Paralympic sport, the Spanish Paralympic Committee was created in 1995, following the 1992 Summer Paralympics and worked to select the spanish team to the 1996 Summer Paralympics.

Following the 1992 Games, the Catalan Federation of Sports for Disabled developed a program called HospiSport designed at formalizing the integration of sport into rehabilitation by taking patients out of the hospital and having them participate in programs at sport facilities. 26% of the athletes competing at the Barcelona Games had incurred an injury that resulted in their disability before they were fifteen years old. Of these, 80% had participated in some type of sports prior to acquiring their disability.

By the time the 1996 Summer Paralympics arrived, Spanish disability sportspeople were regularly training alongside their able bodied counterparts. In 1996, the Madrid Federation of Physically Disabled Sport (Spanish: Federación Madrileña de Deportes de Minusválidos Físicos) (FMDMF) was created. By 2008, the FMDMF would have 37 Madrid based clubs and specific sport federations aligned with it.

During the late 1990s, the national disabled sports organizations received a grants from Ministry of Education, Culture and Sport (Spanish: Ministerio de Educación, Cultura y Deporte).

=== Sydney and Beyond ===
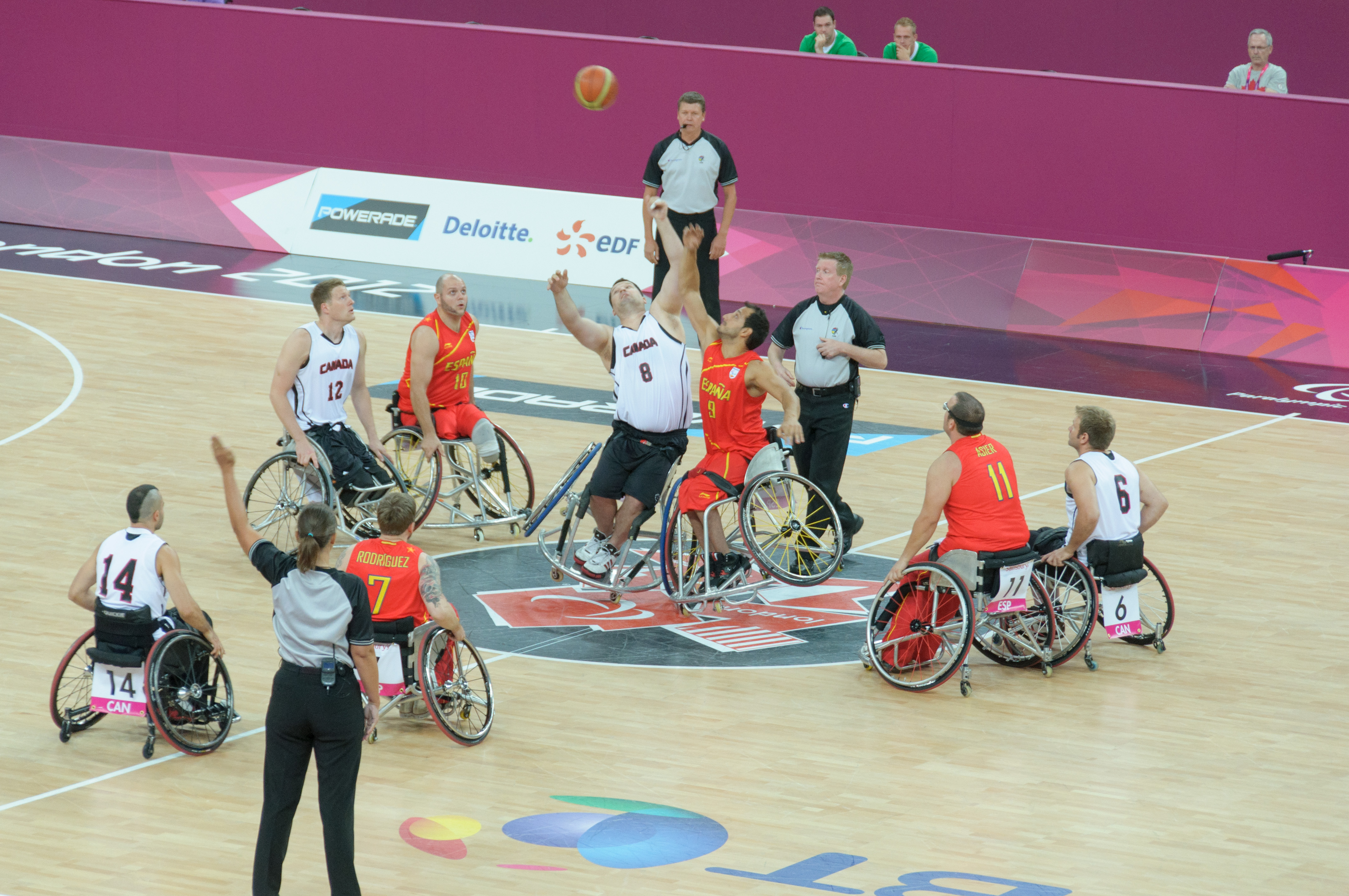
Spain's men play Canada at the 2012 London Games

Domestic wheelchair basketball being played in Madrid in 2013

During the 2000s and 2010s, the national disabled sports organizations received a number of grants from Ministry of Education, Culture and Sport(Spanish: Ministerio de Educación, Cultura y Deporte). In June 2005, Plan ADOP was created to better support Paralympic competitors in their quest to qualify for the Games. It was signed into law by Prime Minister, José Luis Rodríguez Zapatero. The budget for Beijing Games Paralympic cycle was €7 million. Funding for the London cycle, which started following the conclusion of the 2008 Summer Paralympics was €17.5 million with funding drawn from 20 different companies and organizations.

From 2004 to 2008, participation in disabled sports in Madrid grew at a rate of 33.10% a year. By 2008, 60 different Paralympic athletes had been integrated into programs run at Spain's regional High Performance Centers.

== Participation ==
To participate in sanctioned events on the local level, sportspeople need to be licensed. In Madrid, you can be licensed by FMDMF for an eighteen sports including athletics, swimming, wheelchair basketball, canoeing, badminton, wheelchair tennis, boccia, table tennis, diving, archery, cycling, sports shooting, fencing, sailing, alpine skiing, powerchair soccer and powerlifting. In the 2010, there were around 800 wheelchair basketball players in Spain playing for 42 different teams.

== Funding ==
There are two major funding bodies for disabled sports in Spain, ONCE and the Consejo Superior de Deportes.
