= Spain at the 2014 Winter Paralympics =

- IPC code: ESP
- NPC: Spanish Paralympic Committee
- Website: www.paralimpicos.es (in Spanish)

in Sochi
- Competitors: 7 in 1 sport
- Flag bearer: Jon Santacana Maiztegui
- Medals Ranked 13th: Gold 1 Silver 1 Bronze 1 Total 3

Winter Paralympics appearances (overview)
- 1984; 1988; 1992; 1994; 1998; 2002; 2006; 2010; 2014; 2018; 2022; 2026

Spain competed at the 2014 Winter Paralympics in Sochi, Russia, held between 7–16 March 2014.

== Alpine skiing ==
Men

Athlete	Event	Run 1			Run 2			Final/Total		
Athlete	Event	Time	Diff	Rank	Time	Diff	Rank	Time	Diff	Rank
Oscar Antonio Espallargas Juarez	Slalom, sitting	1:06.65	+13.91	23	1:16.92	+17.49	14	2:23.57	+29.79	14
Oscar Antonio Espallargas Juarez	Giant slalom, sitting	1:24.07	+5.97	15	1:19.94	+5.84	13	2:44.01	+11.28	13
Gabriel Juan Gorce Yepes; Guide: Josep Arnau Ferrer Ventura	Downhill, visually impaired	—N/a						1:24.59	+2.83	7
Gabriel Juan Gorce Yepes; Guide: Josep Arnau Ferrer Ventura	Super-G, visually impaired	—N/a						DNF		
Gabriel Juan Gorce Yepes; Guide: Josep Arnau Ferrer Ventura	Combined, visually impaired	56.22	+5.62	2	1:24.14	+6.68	3	2:20.36	+4.49	3rd place, bronze medalist(s)
Gabriel Juan Gorce Yepes; Guide: Josep Arnau Ferrer Ventura	Slalom, visually impaired	52.14	+2.45	6	DNF					
Gabriel Juan Gorce Yepes; Guide: Josep Arnau Ferrer Ventura	Giant slalom, visually impaired	1:25.04	+9.02	12	1:17.14	+3.89	6	2:42.18	+12.56	7
Yon Santacana Maiztegui; Guide: Miguel Galindo Garces	Downhill, visually impaired	—N/a						1:21.76	-	1st place, gold medalist(s)
Yon Santacana Maiztegui; Guide: Miguel Galindo Garces	Super-G, visually impaired	—N/a						1:22.27	+1.69	4
Yon Santacana Maiztegui; Guide: Miguel Galindo Garces	Combined, visually impaired	DNF								
Yon Santacana Maiztegui; Guide: Miguel Galindo Garces	Slalom, visually impaired	53.21	+3.52	7	53.61	+0.09	2	1:46.82	+3.61	2nd place, silver medalist(s)
Yon Santacana Maiztegui; Guide: Miguel Galindo Garces	Giant slalom, visually impaired	1:19.61	+3.59	3	1:15.21	+1.96	4	2:34.82	+5.20	4

Women

Athlete	Event	Run 1			Run 2			Final/Total		
Athlete	Event	Time	Diff	Rank	Time	Diff	Rank	Time	Diff	Rank
Ursula Pueyo Marimon	Super-G, standing	—N/a						DNF		
Ursula Pueyo Marimon	combined, standing	DSQ								
Ursula Pueyo Marimon	Slalom, standing	DNF								
Ursula Pueyo Marimon	Giant slalom, standing	1:36.26	+11.28	13	1:22.95	+9.09	10	2:59.21	+20.37	11

=== Snowboarding ===
Para-snowboarding is making its debut at the Winter Paralympics and it will be placed under the Alpine skiing program during the 2014 Games.

Men

Athlete	Event	Race 1		Race 2		Race 3		Total	
Athlete	Event	Time	Rank	Time	Rank	Time	Rank	Time	Rank
Urko Egea Zabalza	Snowboard cross	1:03.89	15	1:11.76	19	1:02.60	15	2:06.49	17
Aitor Martin Puertas	Snowboard cross	DSQ		1:29.54	30	1:17.50	25	2:47.04	30

Women

Athlete	Event	Race 1		Race 2		Race 3		Total	
Athlete	Event	Time	Rank	Time	Rank	Time	Rank	Time	Rank
Astrid Fina Paredes	Snowboard cross	1:23.80	7	1:41.42	6	1:25.42	6	2:48.82	6

== See also ==
- Spain at the Paralympics
- Spain at the 2014 Winter Olympics
