= Spain at the 1992 Winter Paralympics =

- IPC code: ESP
- NPC: Spanish Paralympic Committee
- Website: www.paralimpicos.es (in Spanish)

in Tignes-Albertville
- Medals: Gold 0 Silver 1 Bronze 3 Total 4

Winter Paralympics appearances (overview)
- 1984; 1988; 1992; 1994; 1998; 2002; 2006; 2010; 2014; 2018; 2022; 2026

Athletes from Spain competed at the 1992 Winter Paralympics, which were held in Albertville, France, and won four medals, one silver and three bronze.
