= Spain at the 2022 Winter Paralympics =

- IPC code: ESP
- NPC: Spanish Paralympic Committee

in Beijing, China 4 March 2022 – 13 March 2022
- Competitors: 2 (2 men) in 2 sports
- Flag bearer (opening): Víctor González
- Flag bearer (closing): Pol Makuri Redolad
- Medals: Gold 0 Silver 0 Bronze 0 Total 0

Winter Paralympics appearances (overview)
- 1984; 1988; 1992; 1994; 1998; 2002; 2006; 2010; 2014; 2018; 2022; 2026

Spain competed at the 2022 Winter Paralympics in Beijing, China which took place between 4–13 March 2022.

== Competitors ==
The following is the list of number of competitors participating at the Games per sport/discipline.

Sport	Men	Women	Total
Cross-country skiing	1	0	1
Snowboarding	1	0	1
Total	2	0	2

== Cross-country skiing ==
One skier competed in cross-country skiing.

Standing cross-country

Athlete	Event	Time	Result
Pol Makuri Redolad	Men's 1.5 km sprint freestyle	4:27.32	25
Pol Makuri Redolad	Men's 12.5 km freestyle	52:08.5	22
Pol Makuri Redolad	Men's 20 km classical	1:05:08.8	14

== Snowboarding ==
One snowboarder qualified to compete in snowboarding.

Snowboard cross

Athlete	Event	Qualification			Quarterfinal	Semifinal	Final
Athlete	Event	Run 1	Run 2	Rank	Position	Position	Position
Víctor González	Men's SB-LL1	DQB			did not advance		

== See also ==
- Spain at the Paralympics
- Spain at the 2022 Winter Olympics
