= Spain at the 1998 Winter Paralympics =

Spain at the 1988 Winter Paralympics
- IPC code: ESP
- NPC: Spanish Paralympic Committee
- Website: www.paralimpicos.es (in Spanish)

in Innsbruck
- Medals: Gold 8 Silver 0 Bronze 0 Total 8

Winter Paralympics appearances (overview)
- 1984; 1988; 1992; 1994; 1998; 2002; 2006; 2010; 2014; 2018; 2022; 2026

Spain competed at these games.

The 1998 Games were held in Nagano, Japan. The Games used the same venues as the Winter Olympics.
