= Spain at the 2006 Winter Paralympics =

- IPC code: ESP
- NPC: Spanish Paralympic Committee
- Website: www.paralimpicos.es (in Spanish)

in Turin
- Competitors: 9 in 1 sport
- Medals Ranked 13th: Gold 0 Silver 1 Bronze 1 Total 2

Winter Paralympics appearances (overview)
- 1984; 1988; 1992; 1994; 1998; 2002; 2006; 2010; 2014; 2018; 2022; 2026

Spain participated in the ninth Winter Paralympics in Turin, Italy.

Spain entered nine athletes in the following sports:

- Alpine skiing: 5 male, 4 female

== Medalists ==
Medal	Name	Sport	Event	Date
Silver	Eric Villalon	Alpine skiing	Men's slalom, visually impaired	19 March
Bronze	Eric Villalon	Alpine skiing	Men's giant slalom, visually impaired	17 March

== See also ==
- 2006 Winter Paralympics
- Spain at the 2006 Winter Olympics
