= Spain at the 2026 Winter Paralympics =

- IPC code: ESP
- NPC: Spanish Paralympic Committee

in Milan and Cortina d'Ampezzo, Italy 6 March 2026 – 15 March 2026
- Competitors: 7 (3 men and 4 women) in 4 sports
- Medals Ranked 15th: Gold 2 Silver 1 Bronze 1 Total 4

Winter Paralympics appearances (overview)
- 1984; 1988; 1992; 1994; 1998; 2002; 2006; 2010; 2014; 2018; 2022; 2026

Spain competes at the 2026 Winter Paralympics in Milan and Cortina d'Ampezzo, Italy which takes place between 6–15 March 2026. With 2 golds, a silver and a bronze medal, this is Spain's best performance at a Winter Paralympics since the 2002 edition.

== Medallists ==
Medal	Name	Sport	Event	Date
Gold	Audrey Pascual Seco	Para alpine skiing	Women's super-G, sitting	9 March
Gold	Audrey Pascual Seco	Para alpine skiing	Women's super combined, sitting	10 March
Silver	Audrey Pascual Seco	Para alpine skiing	Women's downhill, sitting	7 March
Bronze	Audrey Pascual Seco	Para alpine skiing	Women's slalom, sitting	14 March

Medals by sport
Sport	1st place, gold medalist(s)	2nd place, silver medalist(s)	3rd place, bronze medalist(s)	Total
Alpine skiing	2	1	1	4
Total	2	1	1	4

Medals by date
Day	Date	1st place, gold medalist(s)	2nd place, silver medalist(s)	3rd place, bronze medalist(s)	Total
Day 1	7 March	0	1	0	1
Day 3	9 March	1	0	0	1
Day 4	10 March	1	0	0	1
Day 8	14 March	0	0	1	1
Total		2	1	1	4

Medals by gender
Gender	1st place, gold medalist(s)	2nd place, silver medalist(s)	3rd place, bronze medalist(s)	Total
Male	0	0	0	0
Female	2	1	1	4
Mixed	0	0	0	0
Total	2	1	1	4

== Competitors ==
The following is the list of number of competitors participating at the Games per sport/discipline.

Sport	Men	Women	Total
Alpine skiing	1	4	5
Biathlon	1	0	1
Cross-country skiing	1	0	1
Snowboarding	1	0	1
Total	4	4	8

== Para alpine skiing ==
Spain qualified 5 athletes, 1 man and 4 women, for the para alpine skiing events.

Men

Athlete	Class	Event	Run 1	Run 2	Rank
Javier Marcos Arteaga	LW11	Giant slalom, sitting	DNF		
Javier Marcos Arteaga	LW11	Slalom, sitting	1:01.08 (21)	DSQ	

Women

Athlete	Class	Event	Super-G		Slalom				Total	
Athlete	Class	Event	Time	Rank	Time	Rank	Run 1	Run 2	Time	Rank
Audrey Pascual Seco	LW12-2	Downhill, sitting	—N/a						1:25.84	2nd place, silver medalist(s)
Audrey Pascual Seco	LW12-2	Super-G, sitting	—N/a						1:17.82	1st place, gold medalist(s)
Audrey Pascual Seco	LW12-2	Combined, sitting	1:21.88	1	49.34	4	—N/a		2:11.22	1st place, gold medalist(s)
Audrey Pascual Seco	LW12-2	Giant slalom, sitting	—N/a				DNF			
Audrey Pascual Seco	LW12-2	Slalom, sitting	—N/a				43.02 (1)	45.02 (4)	1:28.04	3rd place, bronze medalist(s)
Alejandra Requesens Leibenger	AS3	Giant slalom, vision impaired	—N/a				1:43.71 (13)	1:38.01 (12)	3:21.72	12
Alejandra Requesens Leibenger	AS3	Slalom, vision impaired	—N/a				58.55 (12)	57.92 (12)	1:56.47	12
Iraide Rodríguez	LW10-2	Giant slalom, sitting	—N/a				1:34.06 (14)	1:37.20 (11)	3:11.26	11
Iraide Rodríguez	LW10-2	Slalom, sitting	—N/a				56.58 (9)	57.87 (9)	1:54.45	9
María Martín-Granizo	LW2	Giant slalom, standing	—N/a				1:16.24 (9)	DNF		
María Martín-Granizo	LW2	Slalom, standing	—N/a				45.66 (8)	47.82 (9)	1:33.48	8

== Para Biathlon ==
Spain qualified 1 athlete to compete in biathlon.

Men

Athlete	Event	Classification	Factor	Time	Misses	Factored time	Qualification		Final	
Athlete	Event	Classification	Factor	Time	Misses	Factored time	Time	Rank	Time	Rank
Higinio Rivero Hernández	Sprint, sitting	LW10.5	87%	27:05.4	2+1	23:34.1	—N/a			20
Higinio Rivero Hernández	Individual, sitting	LW10.5	87%	51:51.3	7 (1+4+1+1)	45:06.8	—N/a			23
Higinio Rivero Hernández	Pursuit, sitting	LW10.5	87%	—N/a			9:32.8	13 Q	13:08.9	16

== Cross-country skiing ==
One skier competed in cross-country skiing.

Standing cross-country

Athlete	Event	Classification	Factor	Qualification			Semifinals			Final		
Athlete	Event	Classification	Factor	Time	Factored time	Result	Time	Factored time	Result	Time	Factored time	Result
Higinio Rivero Hernández	Men's sprint sitting	LW10.5	87%	2:31.04	2:53.61	24	Did not advance					
Higinio Rivero Hernández	Men's 20km Sitting	LW10.5	87%	—N/a						59:49.0	1:08:45.3	20

== Snowboarding ==
One snowboarder qualified to compete in snowboarding.

Snowboard cross

Athlete	Event	Qualification			Quarterfinal	Semifinal	Final
Athlete	Event	Run 1	Run 2	Rank	Position	Position	Position
Emilio Redondo Simón	Men's SB-LL2	54.91	59.60	14	4	Did not advance	

Snowboard slalom

Athlete	Event	Final		
Athlete	Event	Run 1	Run 2	Rank
Emilio Redondo Simón	Men's SB-LL2	1:00.04 (9)	1:00.21 (12)	12

== See also ==
- Spain at the Paralympics
- Spain at the 2026 Winter Olympics
