= Spain at the 1994 Winter Paralympics =

- IPC code: ESP
- NPC: Spanish Paralympic Committee
- Website: www.paralimpicos.es (in Spanish)

in Lillehammer
- Medals: Gold 1 Silver 6 Bronze 3 Total 10

Winter Paralympics appearances (overview)
- 1984; 1988; 1992; 1994; 1998; 2002; 2006; 2010; 2014; 2018; 2022; 2026

Spain competed at these games.

The 1994 Games were held in Lillehammer, Norway. The Games used the same venues as the Winter Olympics.
