= Spain at the 2002 Winter Paralympics =

- IPC code: ESP
- NPC: Spanish Paralympic Committee
- Website: www.paralimpicos.es (in Spanish)

in Salt Lake City
- Medals Ranked 12th: Gold 3 Silver 2 Bronze 2 Total 7

Winter Paralympics appearances (overview)
- 1984; 1988; 1992; 1994; 1998; 2002; 2006; 2010; 2014; 2018; 2022; 2026

Spain participated in the eighth Winter Paralympics in Salt Lake City, United States. It won 3 gold, 2 silver and 2 bronze medals.

== See also ==
- 2002 Winter Paralympics
- Spain at the 2002 Winter Olympics
