= Spain at the 1988 Winter Paralympics =

- IPC code: ESP
- NPC: Spanish Paralympic Committee
- Website: www.paralimpicos.es (in Spanish)

in Innsbruck
- Medals: Gold 1 Silver 2 Bronze 1 Total 4

Winter Paralympics appearances (overview)
- 1984; 1988; 1992; 1994; 1998; 2002; 2006; 2010; 2014; 2018; 2022; 2026

Spain competed at these games.

The 1988 Winter Paralympics were held in Innsbruck, Austria. The Games did not have the same venues as the 1988 Winter Olympics.
