= Aleix Suñé =

Spanish para-alpine ski guide

Personal information
- Nationality: Spanish
- Born: 21 May 1986 (age 40) Girona, Catalonia, Spain

Sport
- Country: Spain
- Sport: Para-alpine skiing
- Events: Downhill slalom Giant slalom Super combined Super G

Aleix Suñé (born 21 May 1986) is a Spanish para-alpine ski guide. He competed at the 2009 IPC Alpine Skiing World Championships while serving as the guide skier for Gabriel Gorce and the 2010 Winter Paralympics with Andrés Boira.

== Personal ==
Suñé was born on 21 May 1986 and was honoured at the 2010 Sports Gala XV.

== Skiing ==
Suñé was the sighted guide skier for Gabriel Gorce and Andrés Boira. At the 2007 Paralympic Winter World Cup, he earned a medal with Gorce. In March 2009, he competed with visually impaired Gorce at the European Cup Alpine skiing for the Disabled. He finished second in the slalom event. The pair finished sixth overall with 437 points. At the 2009 IPC Alpine Skiing World Championships, he and Gorce finished fifth in the Super Combined event.

In November 2009, Suñé attended an event in Madrid organised by Programa de Alto Rendimiento Paralímpico (Programa ARPA) as part of the preparation for the Vancouver Games. Following this, he participated in additional team training at Centre de Tecnificació de La Cerdanya (Girona). At the 2010 IPC Alpine Skiing World Cup in Abtenau, Austria, serving as Andrés Boira's guide skier, the pair finished seventh in the slalom following a first run where they were in the sixth position and a second run where they were in the seventh position. He was unable to compete in the Super Combined event because it was cancelled. He then competed with Boira in the third round of the European Cup later in January 2010 at La Molina in Spain. He won a gold medal in the slalom event. He came into the Aspen World Cup event with 220 World Cup points, ranking ninth in the competition as Boira's guide. This was the last World Cup event before the 2010 Games.

Before departing for the 2010 Winter Paralympics in Vancouver, Suñé participated in a departure ceremony attended by State Secretary for Sport Sport Jaime Lissavetzky, secretary general of Social Policy Francisco Moza, the President of the Spanish Paralympic Committee Miguel Carballeda, and managing director of the Spanish Paralympic Committee Alberto Jofre. Fog in Vancouver resulted in a change in scheduling for his ski events. Following the Games, the Spanish Paralympic team attended a welcome back celebration at the ONCE Foundation that was also attended by Infanta Elena, Duchess of Lugo.
