= Félix Aznar =

Spanish paralympic alpine skier

Personal information
- Nationality: Spanish
- Born: Spain

Sport
- Country: Spain
- Sport: Para-alpine skiing
- Event(s): Downhill; Slalom; Giant slalom Super combined Super G

Félix Aznar is a Spanish skier who has served as para-alpine guide for Paralympic skiers including Andrés Boira and Gabriel Gorce. He skied with Gorce at the 2010 Winter Paralympics in Vancouver. He has competed in the European Cup and the IPC Alpine Skiing World Cup as a guide skier.

== Skiing ==
Aznar was the guide-skier for Andrés Boira and Gabriel Gorce.

Skiing with Boira, Aznar finished the 2006/2007 European Cup season in second place. At the 2007 Paralympic Winter World Cup, he earned a medal. At the March 2008 Italian National Championships, Boria and Aznar finished second in the Super G, were disqualified in the giant slalom and finished second in the slalom. At the last round of the European Cup in March 2008, an event held in La Molina, Spain, Boria and Aznar were some of the Spanish skiers competing at the event. He finished the 2007/2008 European Cup season in eighth place after the five test events.

At the February 2009 IPC Alpine Skiing World Championships, while continuing to ski with Boira, Aznar finished sixth in the Super Combined event. In March 2009, he competed at the European Cup Alpine skiing for the Disabled. He finished first in the slalom event. He finished fifth in the giant slalom, seventh in Super G and eighth in Super Combined event. Overall, the pair finished fourth with 475 points. In November 2009, he attended an event in Madrid organised by Programa de Alto Rendimiento Paralímpico (Programa ARPA) as part of the preparation for the Vancouver Games as Gorce's guide skier. Following this, he participated in additional team training at Centro de Tecnificación de La Cerdanya (Gerona).

Aznar came into the 2010 Aspen, Colorado IPC Alpine Skiing World Cup event with 199 World Cup points, ranking eleventh in the competition. This event was the final one before the 2010 Games.

Before departing for Vancouver for the 2010 Games, Aznar participated in a departure ceremony attended by State Secretary for Sport Jaime Lissavetzky, secretary-general of Social Policy Francisco Moza, the President of the Spanish Paralympic Committee Miguel Carballeda, and managing director of the Spanish Paralympic Committee Alberto Jofre. His youth was one of the contributing factors in being chosen for the 2010 Paralympic team as the Spanish Paralympic Committee believed investing in him then would result in a skier who would be around for several Paralympic Games. The whole Spanish team arrived in Whistler ahead of the 2010 Games by 7 February. He was Gabriel Gorce's guide during the Games. Skier and guide shared a room in the Paralympic Village during the Games. The pair did not finish and were disqualified from the downhill event after Gorce missed a gate. Fog in Vancouver resulted in a change in scheduling for his ski events. Following the Games, the Spanish Paralympic team attended a welcome back celebration at the ONCE Foundation that was also attended by Infanta Elena, Duchess of Lugo.
