= Arnau Ferrer =

Spanish para-alpine ski guide

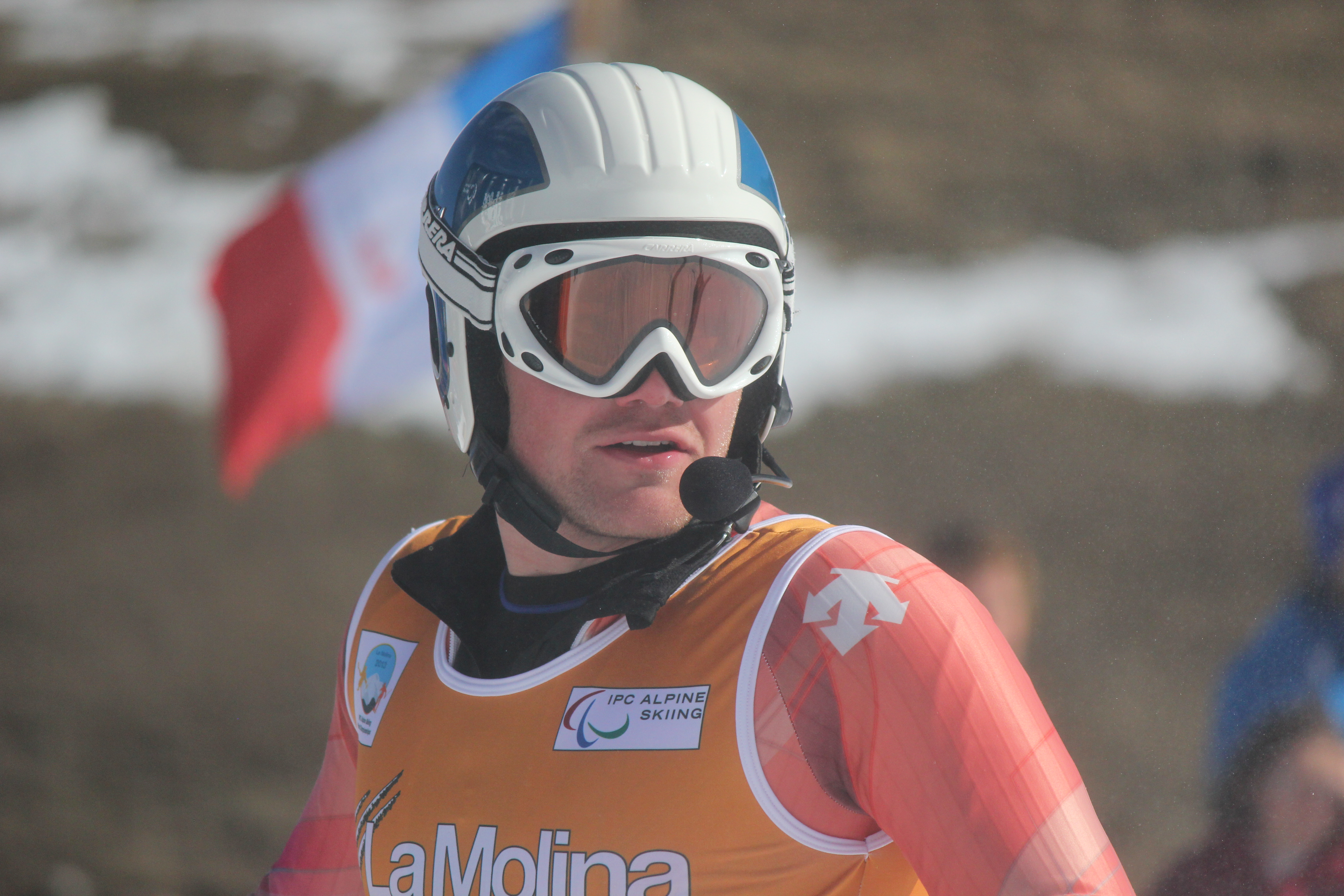
- Arnau Ferrer 6.

Personal information
- Nationality: Spanish
- Born: September 3, 1990 (age 34); Spain
- Website: http://www.gabrielgorce.blogspot.com.es/

Sport
- Country: Spain
- Sport: Para-alpine skiing
- Event(s): Downhill; Slalom; Giant slalom Super combined Super G
- Club: LMCE

Arnau Ferrer (born 3 September 1990) is a Spanish para-alpine ski guide. He was Gabriel Gorce's guide in 2010, 2011 and 2012.

== Personal ==
Ferrer was born on 3 September 1990, and is from Barcelona.

== Skiing ==
Ferrer is a para-alpine ski guide. He was Gabriel Gorce's guide in 2010, 2011 and 2012. He is a member of the LMCE ski club.

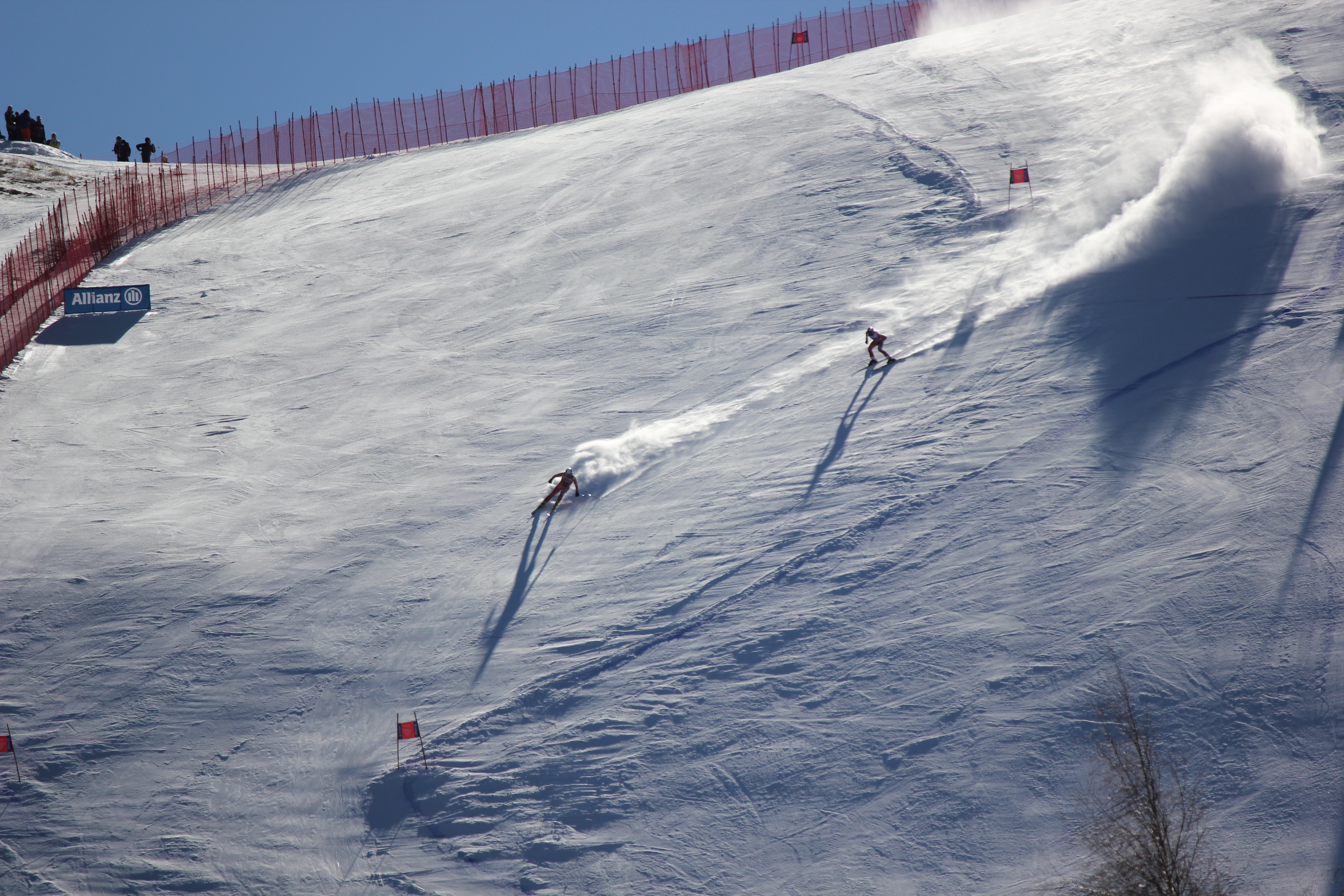
Gorce and Ferrer at the 2013 IPC Alpine World Championships in the downhill event

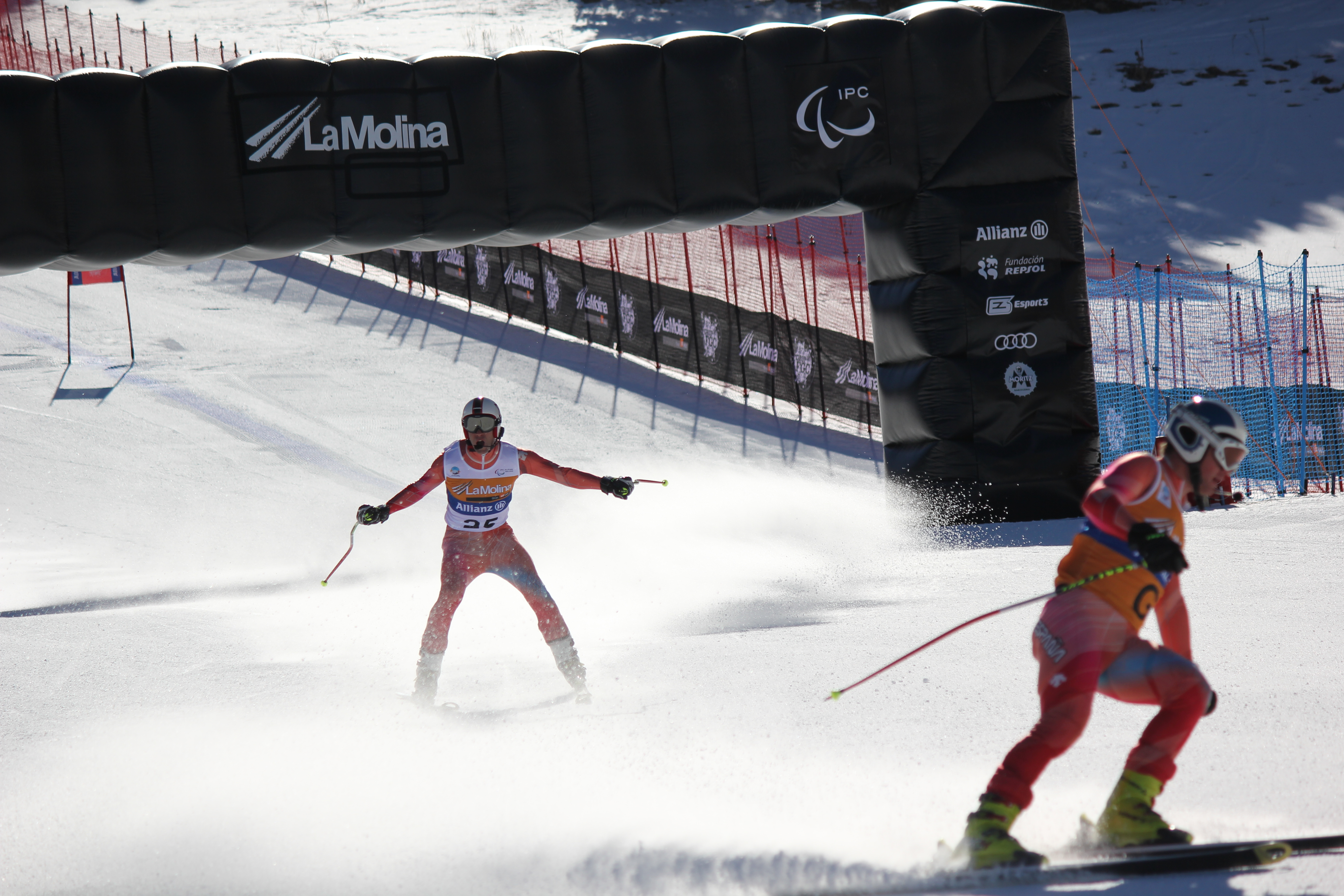
Gorce and Ferrer at the 2013 IPC Alpine World Championships in the downhill event

At the first World Cup event in the 2010/2011 season, which was held in Arta Terme, Italy, Ferrer guided Gorce. The pair finished fifth in the first of the four events held. Ferrer competed in a November 2010 ski competition in Landgraaf, Netherlands. He earned a gold medal in the downhill event while skiing with Gorce. He was the only Spaniard at the competition who had not competed at the 2010 Winter Paralympics. In December 2010, he competed in the second stage of the European Cup with Gorce at a competition in Austria. The pair earned an eighth and eleventh-place finish, and a DNF in the slalom event. He skied with Gorce again at a January 2011 World Cup event. This one was held in Arta Terme, Italy. They finished fifth in the slalom, and sixth in the giant slalom with a combined run time of 2'45"93. The pair failed to finish in the slalom event. The pair competed at Spain's national championship in April 2011. They finished second in the slalom event with a combined time of 1'13"79.

In November 2011 at the first IPC sanctioned event of the year which was held in the Netherlands, the pair had times of 56"75 and 30"43 for a combined time of 1'27 "18 in the slalom event. This time earned them a first place. In January 2012, the pair competed in the World Cup event held in Arta Terme, Italy. The pair finished fifth in the giant slalom event with a combined time of 2'43"24. The pair did not medal in any other events at that Cup event. He participated in the 2012 Campeonatos de España de Esquí held in Valle de Arán, where the slalom, giant slalom and Super G events were contested. Skiing with Gorce, they earned silvers in every event. In a February 2012 European Cup event held in Tignes, he skied with Gorce. The pair was unable to finish any of the races they competed in at the event. In early March 2012, he competed in a World Cup event in Colorado with Gorce, where the pair earned a bronze medal in the giant slalom. His performance at the competition was the best for the pair during 2011/2012 season. In March 2012, he competed at the Canadian hosted World Cup Alpine skiing with Gorce. They finished their first run in the Super G with a time of 1'42"19, which left them in sixth place. They had a time of 1'38"18 in their second run, which left them fourth overall. At the end of the event, they had 460 total World Cup points. Near the end of the 2011/2012 ski season, he participated in a World Cup event in Italy where he failed to finish in the giant slalom event while skiing with Gorce. At a January 2013 World Cup event in Switzerland, skiing with Gorce, he finished sixth in the slalom event.
