= Spain at the Paralympics =

- IPC code: ESP
- NPC: Spanish Paralympic Committee
- Website: www.paralimpicos.es (in Spanish)
- Medals Ranked 11th: Gold 239 Silver 263 Bronze 268 Total 770

Summer appearances
- 1968; 1972; 1976; 1980; 1984; 1988; 1992; 1996; 2000; 2004; 2008; 2012; 2016; 2020; 2024

Winter appearances
- 1984; 1988; 1992; 1994; 1998; 2002; 2006; 2010; 2014; 2018; 2022; 2026

Athletes from Spain have competed at the Paralympic Games since the 1968 Summer events and the country hosted the 1992 Summer Paralympics. Competitors have represented Spain in ten of the twelve Summer Paralympics, missing only the first two events in Rome and Tokyo.

Spain's breakthrough year came in 1992 when they hosted the event; their medal tally rocketed with a level of performance that would be maintained for the following two events. The 2000 Summer Paralympics in Sydney saw their greatest achievements at the Games but the medal victories were overshadowed by a cheating controversy that would change the way that intellectually disabled competitors were tested for their disability (see Cheating at the Paralympic Games).

== Medal tables ==
Red border color indicates host nation status.

=== Medals by Summer Games ===
Games	Gold	Silver	Bronze	Total	Rank
(Italy) 1960 Rome	did not participate				
(Japan) 1964 Tokyo	did not participate				
(Israel) 1968 Tel-Aviv	0	3	1	4	20
(West Germany) 1972 Heidelberg	0	4	0	4	27
(Canada) 1976 Toronto	4	6	2	12	22
(Netherlands) 1980 Arnhem	1	13	9	23	28
(United States) 1984 New York (United Kingdom) 1984 Stoke Mandeville	22	10	12	44	11
(South Korea) 1988 Seoul	18	13	12	43	13
(Spain) 1992 Barcelona-Madrid	39	32	49	107	5
(United States) 1996 Atlanta	39	31	36	106	5
(Australia) 2000 Sydney	38	30	38	106	4
(Greece) 2004 Athens	20	27	24	71	7
(China) 2008 Beijing	15	21	22	58	10
(United Kingdom) 2012 London	8	18	16	42	17
(Brazil) 2016 Rio de Janeiro	9	14	8	31	11
(Japan) 2020 Tokyo	9	15	12	36	15
(France) 2024 Paris	7	11	22	40	17
(United States) 2028 Los Angeles	Future event				
Total	224	247	256	727	11

=== Medals by Winter Games ===
Games	Gold	Silver	Bronze	Total	Rank
(Sweden) 1976 Örnsköldsvik	did not participate				
(Norway) 1980 Geilo	did not participate				
(Austria) 1984 Innsbruck	0	0	0	0	–
(Austria) 1988 Innsbruck	1	2	1	4	11
(France) 1992 Tignes-Albertville	0	1	3	4	17
(Norway) 1994 Lillehammer	1	6	3	10	13
(Japan) 1998 Nagano	8	0	0	8	7
(United States) 2002 Salt Lake City	3	2	2	7	12
(Italy) 2006 Turin	0	1	1	2	13
(Canada) 2010 Vancouver-Whistler	1	2	0	3	13
(Russia) 2014 Sochi	1	1	1	3	13
(South Korea) 2018 PyeongChang	0	1	1	2	23
(China) 2022 Beijing	0	0	0	0	–
(Italy) 2026 Milan-Cortina	2	1	1	4	14
Total	17	17	12	46	18

=== Medals by summer sport ===
After the 2024 Paris Paralympics.

Leading in that sport

Rank	Sport	Gold	Silver	Bronze	Total
1	Swimming	112	130	125	367
2	Athletics	82	69	61	212
3	Cycling	15	18	24	57
4	Boccia	5	7	7	19
5	Judo	4	9	8	21
6	Triathlon	3	2	4	9
7	Table tennis	1	6	13	20
8	Shooting	1	2	3	6
9	Wheelchair fencing	1	0	5	6
10	Archery	0	2	1	3
11	Goalball	0	1	1	2
12	Wheelchair basketball	0	1	0	1
13	Football 5-a-side	0	0	2	2
14	Football 7-a-side	0	0	1	1
14	Wheelchair tennis	0	0	1	1
16	Paracanoeing	0	0	0	0
16	Parataekwondo	0	0	0	0
16	Powerlifting	0	0	0	0
16	Rowing	0	0	0	0
Totals (19 entries)		224	247	256	727

=== Medals by winter sport ===
Leading in that sport

Sport	Gold	Silver	Bronze	Total
Alpine skiing	17	15	11	43
Cross-country skiing	0	2	1	3
Snowboarding	0	0	1	1
Totals (3 entries)	17	17	13	47

== Summary by sport ==
=== Archery ===
Games	Gold	Silver	Bronze	Total	Ranking
(United States) 1984 Los Angeles	0	1	0	1	13
(South Korea) 1988 Seoul	0	0	1	1	9
(Spain) 1992 Barcelona	0	1	0	1	7
Total	0	2	1	3	35

=== Athletics ===
Games	Gold	Silver	Bronze	Total	Ranking
(Canada) 1976 Toronto	2	3	1	6	24
(Russia) 1980 Moscow	0	3	3	6	28
(United States) 1984 Los Angeles	3	1	3	7	25
(South Korea) 1988 Seoul	6	3	3	12	19
(Spain) 1992 Barcelona	22	14	12	48	2
(United States) 1996 Atlanta	21	15	13	49	2
(Australia) 2000 Sydney	14	12	11	37	4
(Greece) 2004 Athens	2	6	3	11	26
(China) 2008 Beijing	1	1	5	7	32
(United Kingdom) 2012 London	3	2	0	5	17
(Brazil) 2016 Rio de Janeiro	3	2	2	7	17
(Japan) 2020 Tokyo	4	4	1	9	15
(France) 2024 Paris	1	3	4	8	30
Total	82	69	61	212	8

=== Boccia ===
Games	Gold	Silver	Bronze	Total	Ranking
(Spain) 1992 Barcelona	2	0	0	2	1
(United States) 1996 Atlanta	2	1	1	4	1
(Australia) 2000 Sydney	0	3	2	5	5
(Greece) 2004 Athens	1	2	2	5	3
(China) 2008 Beijing	0	1	2	3	6
Total	5	7	7	19	7

=== Wheelchair basketball ===
Games	Gold	Silver	Bronze	Total	Ranking
(Brazil) 2016 Rio de Janeiro	0	1	0	1	2
Total	0	1	0	1	11

Event	First medal	First gold medal	Gold	Silver	Bronze	Total	Best finish
Men's tournament	2016	—N/a	0	1	0	1	(silver) (2016)
Women's tournament	—N/a	—N/a	0	0	0	0	8th (2020,2024)

=== Cycling ===
Games	Gold	Silver	Bronze	Total	Ranking
(Spain) 1992 Barcelona	1	0	3	4	6
(United States) 1996 Atlanta	1	1	3	5	6
(Australia) 2000 Sydney	1	2	3	6	6
(Greece) 2004 Athens	3	4	0	7	2
(China) 2008 Beijing	3	5	3	11	5
(United Kingdom) 2012 London	2	2	3	7	8
(Brazil) 2016 Rio de Janeiro	0	1	2	3	16
(Japan) 2020 Tokyo	2	0	4	6	11
(France) 2024 Paris	2	3	3	8	7
Total	15	18	24	57	8

=== Wheelchair fencing ===
Games	Gold	Silver	Bronze	Total	Ranking
(Spain) 1992 Barcelona	1	0	2	3	4
(United States) 1996 Atlanta	0	0	1	1	7
(Australia) 2000 Sydney	0	0	1	1	7
(France) 2024 Paris	0	0	1	1	11
Total	1	0	5	6	16

=== Football 5-a-side ===
Games	Gold	Silver	Bronze	Total	Ranking
(Greece) 2004 Athens	0	0	1	1	3
(United Kingdom) 2012 London	0	0	1	1	3
Total	0	0	2	2	6

=== Football 7-a-side ===
Games	Gold	Silver	Bronze	Total	Ranking
(United States) 1996 Atlanta	0	0	1	1	3
Total	0	0	1	1	12

=== Goalball ===
Games	Gold	Silver	Bronze	Total	Ranking
(United States) 1996 Atlanta	0	0	1	1	3
(Australia) 2000 Sydney	0	1	0	1	2
Total	0	1	1	2	16

Event	First medal	First gold medal	Gold	Silver	Bronze	Total	Best finish
Men's tournament	1996	—N/a	0	0	1	1	(bronze) (1996)
Women's tournament	2000	—N/a	0	1	0	1	(silver) (2000)

=== Judo ===
Games	Gold	Silver	Bronze	Total	Ranking
(Spain) 1992 Barcelona	1	1	0	2	2
(United States) 1996 Atlanta	0	1	1	2	9
(Australia) 2000 Sydney	0	2	1	3	6
(Greece) 2004 Athens	1	3	2	6	4
(China) 2008 Beijing	1	1	1	3	5
(United Kingdom) 2012 London	1	0	2	3	6
(Japan) 2020 Tokyo	0	1	0	1	11
(France) 2024 Paris	0	0	1	1	17
Total	4	9	8	21	9

Event	First medal	First gold medal	Gold	Silver	Bronze	Total	Best finish
Men's Heavyweight	2000	—N/a	0	1	0	1	(silver) (2000)
Men's Half-heavyweight	—N/a	—N/a	0	0	0	0	Quarterfinals (2004)
Men's Middleweight	1996	—N/a	0	1	1	2	(silver) (1996)
Men's Half-middleweight	1996	—N/a	0	0	1	1	(bronze) (1996)
Men's lightweight	1992	—N/a	0	1	0	1	(silver) (1992)
Men's Half-lightweight	1992	1992	1	3	0	4	(gold) (1992)
Men's Extra-lightweight	2000	—N/a	0	0	1	1	(bronze) (2000)
Women's Heavyweight	2004	—N/a	0	1	0	1	(silver) (2004)
Women's Middleweight	2004	2004	3	0	0	3	(gold) (2004, 2008, 2012)
Women's Half-middleweight	2004	—N/a	0	1	2	3	(silver) (2008)
Women's Lightweight	2004	—N/a	0	1	2	3	(silver) (2004)
Women's Half-lightweight	—N/a	—N/a	0	0	0	0	4th (2008)
Women's Extra-lightweight	—N/a	—N/a	0	0	0	0	Quarterfinals (2008, 2012)

=== Shooting ===
Games	Gold	Silver	Bronze	Total	Ranking
(Spain) 1992 Barcelona	0	1	0	1	11
(United States) 1996 Atlanta	1	0	0	1	7
(Australia) 2000 Sydney	0	0	1	1	13
(United Kingdom) 2012 London	0	1	0	1	11
(Japan) 2020 Tokyo	0	0	1	1	14
(France) 2024 Paris	0	0	1	1	17
Total	1	2	3	6	28

=== Swimming ===
Games	Gold	Silver	Bronze	Total	Ranking
(Israel) 1968 Tel Aviv	0	3	1	4	17
(Germany) 1972 Heidelberg	0	4	0	4	16
(Canada) 1976 Toronto	2	3	1	6	14
(Russia) 1980 Moscow	1	10	6	17	14
(United States) 1984 Los Angeles	19	8	9	36	10
(South Korea) 1988 Seoul	12	10	8	30	10
(Spain) 1992 Barcelona	7	14	22	43	10
(United States) 1996 Atlanta	14	13	14	41	5
(Australia) 2000 Sydney	22	9	16	47	2
(Greece) 2004 Athens	13	12	15	40	5
(China) 2008 Beijing	10	12	9	31	6
(United Kingdom) 2012 London	2	11	9	22	14
(Brazil) 2016 Rio de Janeiro	6	8	3	17	7
(Japan) 2020 Tokyo	2	9	3	14	18
(France) 2024 Paris	2	4	9	15	14
Total	112	130	125	367	9

=== Table tennis ===
Games	Gold	Silver	Bronze	Total	Ranking
(Spain) 1992 Barcelona	0	0	3	3	19
(United States) 1996 Atlanta	0	0	1	1	21
(Australia) 2000 Sydney	1	1	3	5	8
(Greece) 2004 Athens	0	0	1	1	16
(China) 2008 Beijing	0	1	2	3	11
(United Kingdom) 2012 London	0	2	1	3	14
(Brazil) 2016 Rio de Janeiro	0	2	0	2	14
(Japan) 2020 Tokyo	0	0	1	1	21
(France) 2024 Paris	0	0	1	1	25
Total	1	6	13	20	32

=== Wheelchair tennis ===
Games	Gold	Silver	Bronze	Total	Ranking
(France) 2024 Paris	0	0	1	1	4
Total	0	0	1	1	11

Event	First medal	First gold medal	Gold	Silver	Bronze	Total	Best finish
Men's singles	—N/a	—N/a	0	0	0	0	4th (2024)
Men's doubles	2024	—N/a	0	0	1	1	(bronze) (2024)
Women's singles	—N/a	—N/a	0	0	0	0	Round of 16 (1992)
Women's doubles	—N/a	—N/a	0	0	0	0	Round of 16 (2004, 2012)

=== Triathlon ===
Games	Gold	Silver	Bronze	Total	Ranking
(Brazil) 2016 Rio de Janeiro	0	0	1	1	8
(Japan) 2020 Tokyo	1	1	2	4	2
(France) 2024 Paris	2	1	1	4	3
Total	3	2	4	9	3

== Teams ==
Traditionally, Spain has sent three times as many male competitors as female competitors. At the same time, women have won 48.39% of all Spain's Paralympic medals compared to 24.32% for men.

=== Multi medalists ===
Spanish athletes who have won at least three gold medals or five medals.

Years in Italics mean the athlete participated but did not win any medal.

No.	Athlete	Sport	Participations	Gender	Gold	Silver	Bronze	Total
1	Purificacion Santamarta	Athletics	1980, 1984, 1988, 1992, 1996, 2000, 2004	F	11	4	1	16
2	Richard Oribe	Swimming	1992, 1996, 2000, 2004, 2008, 2012	M	9	6	2	17
3	Sebastián Rodríguez	Swimming	2000, 2004, 2008, 2012	M	8	3	4	15
4	Teresa Perales	Swimming	2000, 2004, 2008, 2012, 2016, 2020, 2024	F	7	10	11	28
5	Javier Conde	Athletics	1992,1996, 2000, 2004, 2008	M	7	2	0	9
6	Sara Carracelas Garcia	Swimming	1996, 2000, 2004, 2008	F	6	1	3	10
7	Javier Torres	Swimming	1992, 1996, 2000, 2004, 2008	M	5	5	6	16
8	Júlio Requena	Athletics	1992, 1996, 2000	M	5	1	2	8
9	Ricardo Ten	Swimming Cycling	1996, 2000, 2004, 2008, 2012, 2016, 2020, 2024	M	4	2	5	11
10	Enhamed Enhamed	Swimming	2004, 2008, 2012	M	4	2	3	9
11	David Casinos	Athletics	2000, 2004, 2008, 2012, 2016	M	4	0	1	5
12	Antonio Cid	Boccia	1992, 1996, 2000, 2004	M	3	2	1	6
13	Jesus Collado Alarcon	Swimming	2000, 2004, 2008, 2012	M	3	0	3	6
14	Carmen Herrera	Judo	2004, 2008, 2012	F	3	0	0	3
14	Michelle Alonso	Swimming	2012, 2016, 2020	F	3	0	0	3
16	Enrique Floriano	Swimming	2000, 2004, 2008, 2012	M	2	4	2	8
17	Miguel Luque	Swimming	2000, 2004, 2008, 2012, 2016, 2020, 2024	M	2	3	3	8
18	Christian Venge	Cycling	2000, 2004, 2008, 2012	M	2	2	1	5
19	Beatriz Mendoza	Athletics	1992, 1996, 2000	F	2	1	3	6
19	Alfonso Cabello	Cycling	2012, 2016, 2020, 2024	M	2	1	3	6
21	Juan Viedma	Athletics	1992, 1996, 2000	M	2	1	2	5
22	Núria Marquès	Swimming	2016, 2020, 2024	F	1	4	2	7
23	Álvaro Valera	Table tennis	2000, 2004, 2008, 2012, 2016, 2020, 2024	M	1	3	2	6
24	Deborah Font	Swimming	2000, 2004, 2008, 2012	F	1	2	4	7
25	Marta Fernández Infante	Swimming	2020, 2024	F	1	2	3	6
26	Sarai Gascón Moreno	Swimming	2008, 2012, 2016, 2020, 2024	F	0	6	2	8
27	José Manuel Ruiz Reyes	Table tennis	2000, 2004, 2008, 2012, 2016	M	0	3	2	5

== See also ==
- Spain at the Olympics
- Spain at the Deaflympics
