= Andrés Boira =

Spanish Paralympic alpine skier

Personal information
- Full name: Andrés Paulo Boira Díaz
- Nationality: Spanish
- Born: 17 November 1987 (age 38) Vilanova i la Geltrú, Spain

Sport
- Country: Spain
- Sport: Para-alpine skiing
- Event(s): Downhill slalom Giant slalom Super combined Super G

Andrés Paulo Boira Díaz (born 17 November 1987) is a Spanish vision impaired B3 classified para-alpine skier. His guide skiers have included Félix Aznar and Aleix Suñé. He has competed at the 2006 Winter Paralympics, 2009 IPC Alpine Skiing World Championships and the 2010 Winter Paralympics.

== Personal ==
Boira was born in Vilanova i la Geltrú, Barcelona, and has a visual impairment.

== Skiing ==
Boira is a B3 classified skier. His guide skiers included Félix Aznar and Aleix Suñé.

Boira competed at the 2006 Winter Paralympics. At the 2007 Paralympic Winter World Cup, he earned two silver medals and two bronzes. He finished the 2006/2007 European Cup season in second place. At the March 2008 Italian National Championships, Boira and Aznar finished second in the Super G, were disqualified in the giant slalom and finished second in the slalom. At the last round of the European Cup in March 2008, an event held in La Molina, Spain, Boira and Aznar were some of the Spanish skiers competing at the event. He finished the 2007/2008 European Cup season in eighth place after the five test events.

At the first IPC Alpine Skiing World Cup event in the 2008/2009 ski season, which was held at La Molina in Spain, Boira finished fourth overall. At the February 2009 IPC Alpine Skiing World Championships, while skiing with Anzar, he finished sixth in the Super Combined event. In March 2009, with guide Aznar, he competed at the European Cup Alpine skiing for the Disabled. He finished first in the slalom event. He finished fifth in the giant slalom, seventh in Super G and eighth in Super Combined. Overall, the pair finished fourth with 475 points. In November 2009, he attended an event in Madrid organised by Programa de Alto Rendimiento Paralímpico (Programa ARPA) as part of the preparation for the Vancouver Games. Following this, he participated in additional team training at the Centro de Tecnificación de La Cerdanya (Girona). At the 2010 World Cup Alpine skiing for Disabled in Abtenau, Austria, he and his guide finished seventh in the slalom following a first run where they were in the sixth position and a second run where they in the seventh position. He was unable to compete in the Super Combined event because it was cancelled. He then competed with guide Suñé in the third round of the European Cup later in January 2010 at La Molina in Spain. He won a gold medal in the slalom event. At the final event of the 2009/2010 World Cup season, an event held in March 2010 in Aspen, Colorado, he finished sixth in one event with a time of 1:15.57. He finished fifth in the Super Combined. This was the last major event before the 2010 Games. He came into the Aspen World Cup event with 220 World Cup points, ranking ninth in the competition with Suñé as his guide.

Before departing for 2010 Winter Paralympics in Vancouver, Boira participated in a departure ceremony attended by State Secretary for Sport Jaime Lissavetzky, secretary general of Social Policy Francisco Moza, the President of the Spanish Paralympic Committee Miguel Carballeda, and managing director of the Spanish Paralympic Committee Alberto Jofre. The whole Spanish team arrived in Whistler ahead of the 2010 Games by 7 February. Skier and guide shared a room in the Paralympic Village during the Games. Fog in Vancouver resulted in a change in scheduling for his ski events. He finished in last place in the super giant race after he fell in one of his runs. Following the Games, the Spanish Paralympic team attended a welcome back celebration at the ONCE Foundation that was also attended by Infanta Elena, Duchess of Lugo.

Boira participated in the Spanish national championships from 5 to 7 April 2010, which was organised by the Federación Española de Deportes de Personas con Discapacidad Física, Federación Española de Deportes para Paralíticos Cerebrales and Federación Española de Deportes para Ciegos. The Super Giant event is not his specialty.
