= Spanish Federation of Sportspeople with Intellectual Disabilities =

Federación Española de Deportes para Discapacitados Intelectuales
- Purpose: Sports
- Location: Madrid
- Region served: Spain
- Website: https://www.feddi.org/

Spanish Federation of Sportspeople with Intellectual Disabilities (Spanish: Federación Española de Deportes para Discapacitados Intelectuales (FEDDI)) is one of five disability sport organizations that deals with sport on the national level. It focuses on intellectual disabilities, one of two in the country to do so nationally. It has a high performance focus.

== Governance ==
FEDDI, based in Madrid, is one of five disability sport organizations that belongs to the Spanish Paralympic Committee. They have a goal of hosting and governing disability sport on the local level around the country. While a private organization, by law it serves a public interest. Part of the work FEDDI does involves improving social inclusion and acceptance of sportspeople with intellectual disabilities by their peers. Another part of their work is supporting high performance sport at the Paralympic Games, world championships and European championships.

The organization is one of two in the country that support sportspeople with intellectual disabilities. The other is the Special Olympics. FEDDI focuses more on providing competitive sporting opportunities. Members of FEDDI are eligible for some events on the Paralympic program while members of the Special Olympics are not.

FEDDI is composed of regional sport federations including the Andalusian Federation of Sports for the Intellectually Disabled.

The Federation is governed by an executive committee, a general assembly and a president. The President is elected to a four-year post in Winter Paralympic years, with recognized autonomous federations, sports clubs, coaches and athletes eligible to vote in a secret ballot. The President has the role of appointing three vice-presidents, one for economic issues related to the organization, one for sports and one for organization management. In 2013, the President was Antonio Carlos Gomez Oliveros.

Sports FEDDI supports include athletics, basketball, cycling, winter sports, swimming, tennis, table tennis, sport shooting, volleyball, equestrian, gymnastics, futsal, chess, badminton, boccia, handball and soccer. Every year, FEDDI organizes 14 sporting championships in 10 sports with over 4,000 sportspeople competing on one of the three competitive levels found in Spanish sport.

There are two major funding bodies for FEDDI, ONCE and the Consejo Superior de Deportes. Through the Spanish Paralympic Committee, one of their sponsors is Renfe Operadora.

The organization's website provides information on regional intellectual disability sport federations.

== History ==
As a result of the increase in participation and interest in the disability during the late 1960s, then president of the Spanish Olympic Committee Juan Antonio Samaranch directed Guillermo Cabezas to create the Spanish Sports Federation for the Physically Disabled. While originally created only for people with physical disabilities, it soon became a catchall organization representing multiple disability types including people with intellectual disabilities. In 1990, the General Law of Sports was passed, (Spanish: Ley General del Deporte) which led to changes in how sport was organized inside Spain. Eventually, changes in response to the law assisted in creating a landscape that resulted in the creation of several national Spanish disability sport organizations including this one, which was created in 1993. FEDDI was originally named Spanish Sports Federation for Intellectual Disability (Spanish: Federación Española de Deportes para la Discapacidad Intelectual).

The Spanish intellectual disability basketball team cheated at the 2000 Summer Paralympics in Sydney, Australia. At the time, former Madrid Councillor and International Paralympic Committee Executive Executive Board member, Spanish Paralympic Committee (CPE) Vice-President and FEDDI President Fernando Vicente Martin was connected to the cheating. When allegations of cheating first surfaced, he denied any of it took place and claimed all members of the Spanish intellectual disability sport delegation at the Games actually had intellectual disabilities. The CPE launched a full investigation into the claims in November 2000 and concluded that Vicente was partly responsible for the cheating.

In the first half of 1999, they received a grant from Ministry of Education and Culture (Spanish: Ministerio de Educación y Cultura) for 935.000 ₧. In the second half of 2001, they received a grant from Ministry of Education, Culture and Sport (Spanish: Ministerio de Educación, Cultura y Deporte) for 20,706,000 ₧. In the fourth quarter of 2011, they received funding from the Ministry of Education, Culture and Sport (Spanish: Ministerio de Educación, Cultura y Deporte).
