= Spanish Federation of Sports for the Blind =

Spanish Federation of Sports for the Blind (Spanish: Federación Española de Deportes para Ciegos (FEDC)) is the national governing body for blind sport in Spain. It is one of five disability organizations that are part of the Spanish Paralympic Committee. Prior to its creation in 1995, blind sport in Spain was governed by Spanish Sports Federation for the Physically Disabled and Organización Nacional de Ciegos Españoles (ONCE).

== History ==
As a result of the increase in participation and interest in sport for people with physical disabilities during the late 1960s, then president of the Spanish Olympic Committee Juan Antonio Samaranch tasked Guillermo Cabezas to create the Spanish Sports Federation for the Physically Disabled (FEDDF) in 1968. While originally created only for people with physical disabilities, it soon became a catchall organization representing multiple disability types including people with vision impairments.

Prior the creation of FEDC, blind sports was governed by two organizations, FEDDF and ONCE. ONCE officially took over the governance of blind sport from FEDDF in 1987 following the creation of the Bureau of Integrated Sports (Spanish: Negociado de Deportes integrado) in the Culture Section of the Directorate General Spanish: Sección de Cultura de la Dirección General). It officially stopped governing blind sport in Spain following the 1994 World Championships in Berlin. ONCE's organization is the one that FEDC was built from.

In 1990, the General Law of Sports was passed, (Spanish: Ley General del Deporte) which led to changes in how sport was organized inside Spain. Eventually, changes in response to the law assisted in creating a landscape that resulted in the creation of several national Spanish disability sport organizations including FEDC, which was formally created in 1995.

FEDC hosted the first IBSA World Championships and Games with assistance from the International Blind Sports Association in Madrid in 1998, an event which had four sports on the program, athletics, goalball, judo and swimming.

In the first half of 2000, FEDC received a grant from the Ministry of Education, Culture and Sport (Spanish: Ministerio de Educación, Cultura y Deporte) for 5,000,000 ₧ and an additional 804.000 ₧ specifically set aside for the a sports talent screening program. In the second half of 2001, they received a grant from Ministry of Education, Culture and Sport for 3,150,000 ₧. In the fourth quarter of 2011, they received funding from the Ministry of Education, Culture and Sport.

== Governance ==
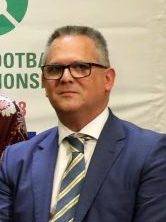
Ángel Luis Gómez Blázquez, President of the federation.

Based in Madrid, FEDC is one of five disability sport organizations that belongs to the Spanish Paralympic Committee. They have a goal of hosting and governing disability sport on the local level around the country. The organization is composed of regional sport federations including the Catalan Federation for the Blind. As of December 2013, Ángel Luis Gómez Blázquez is the President of the federation, having been elected in June 2011. They have access to two major funding bodies, Organización Nacional de Ciegos Españoles (ONCE) and the Consejo Superior de Deportes. Through the Spanish Paralympic Committee, one of their sponsors is Renfe Operadora.

FEDC's website provides information about blind sports, and other information in a format that blind people can use.

== Sports ==
FEDC has historically supported athletics, equestrian, cycling, winter sports, swimming, goalball, sport shooting, sailing, judo, chess and mountaineering. In 2013, the organization had 1,500 licensed vision impaired sportspeople competing in athletics, swimming, judo, chess, futsal, goalball, mountaineering, skiing and sport shooting.
