= Gabriel Gorce =

Spanish para-alpine skier

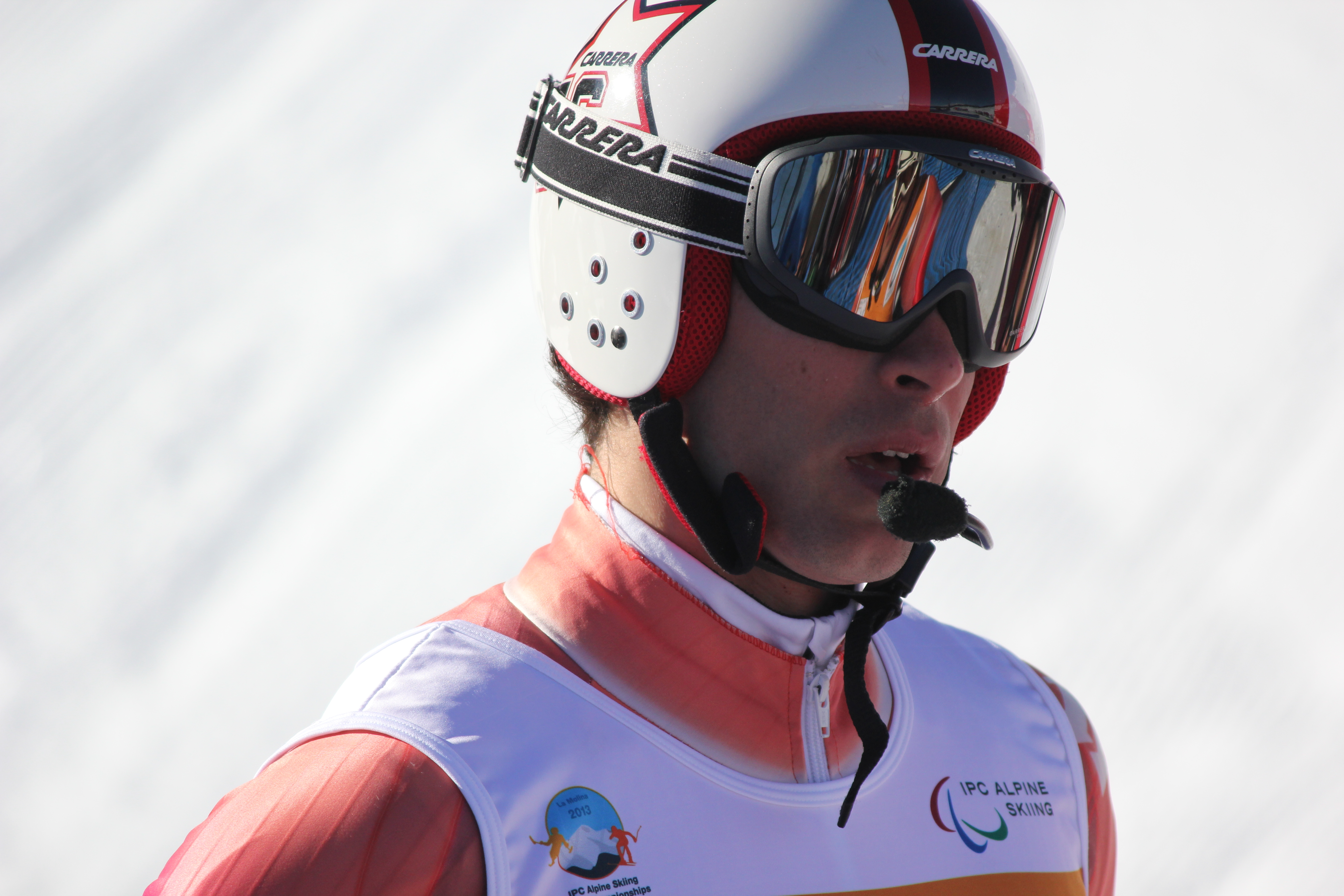

Personal information
- Full name: Gabriel Juan Gorce Yepes
- Nationality: Spanish
- Born: 2 August 1990 (age 35) Madrid, Spain

Sport
- Country: Spain
- Sport: Para-alpine skiing
- Event(s): Downhill; Slalom; Giant slalom Super combined Super G
- Coached by: Sylvana Mestre, Jordi Carbonell

Gabriel Juan Gorce Yepes (born 2 August 1990 in Madrid) is a visually impaired Spanish B2 classified para-alpine skier. He has had several guide skiers including Aleix Suñé, Félix Aznar and Arnau Ferrer. He competed in the European Cup and the IPC Alpine Skiing World Cup, at the 2009 IPC Alpine Skiing World Championships 2011 IPC Alpine Skiing World Championships, 2013 IPC Alpine Skiing World Championships and the 2010 Winter Paralympics. He was also a competitor in the Sochi 2014 Paralympic Winter Games.

== Personal ==
Gorce lives in Escadarcs, La Cerdanya and become a Catalan citizen in 2007, and has a visual impairment. He was honoured at the 2010 Sports Gala XV.

== Skiing ==
Gorce is a B2 classified visually impaired skier. His guide skier was Aleix Suñé. For the 2007/2008 season, he was guided by Aitor Martínez. For the 2009/2010 season and the 2010 Winter Paralympics, his guide was Félix Aznar. Arnau Ferrer was his guide in 2012.

Gorce competed at the 2007 European Cup Alpine skiing for the disabled. At the 2007 Paralympic Winter World Cup, he earned a gold medal and a bronze. He finished the 2006/2007 European Cup season in eighth place. At the March 2008 Italian National Championships, Gorce and Martinez finished fourth in the Super G, third in the giant slalom and third in the slalom. At the last round of the European Cup in March 2008, an event held in La Molina, Spain, Gorce and guide Aitor Martínez were some of the Spanish skiers competing at the event. He finished the 2007/2008 European Cup season in eleventh place after the five test events. At the first IPC Alpine Skiing World Cup event in the 2008/2009 ski season, which was held at La Molina in Spain, he finished third overall. In March 2009, he competed with guide Suñé at the European Cup Alpine skiing for the Disabled. He finished second in the slalom event. The pair finished sixth overall with 437 points. At the 2009 IPC Alpine Skiing World Championships, he and his guide finished fifth in the Super Combined event. It was the first World Championship he had competed in.

In November 2009, Gorce attended an event in Madrid organised by the Programa de Alto Rendimiento Paralímpico (Programa ARPA) as part of the preparation for the Vancouver Games. Following this, he participated in additional team training at the Centro de Tecnificación de La Cerdanya (Gerona). He competed in the third round of the European Cup in January 2010 at La Molina in Spain with guide Anzar. At the January 2010 Austrian World Cup event, he finished eleventh in the giant slalom event. He was unable to compete in the Super Combined event because it was cancelled. At the final event of the 2009/2010 World Cup season, an event held in March 2010 in Aspen, Colorado, he earned an eleventh position in the giant slalom with a time of 1:24.99. He finished seventh in the Super Combined. This was the last major event before the 2010 Games. He came into the Aspen World Cup event with 199 World Cup points, ranking eleventh in the competition.

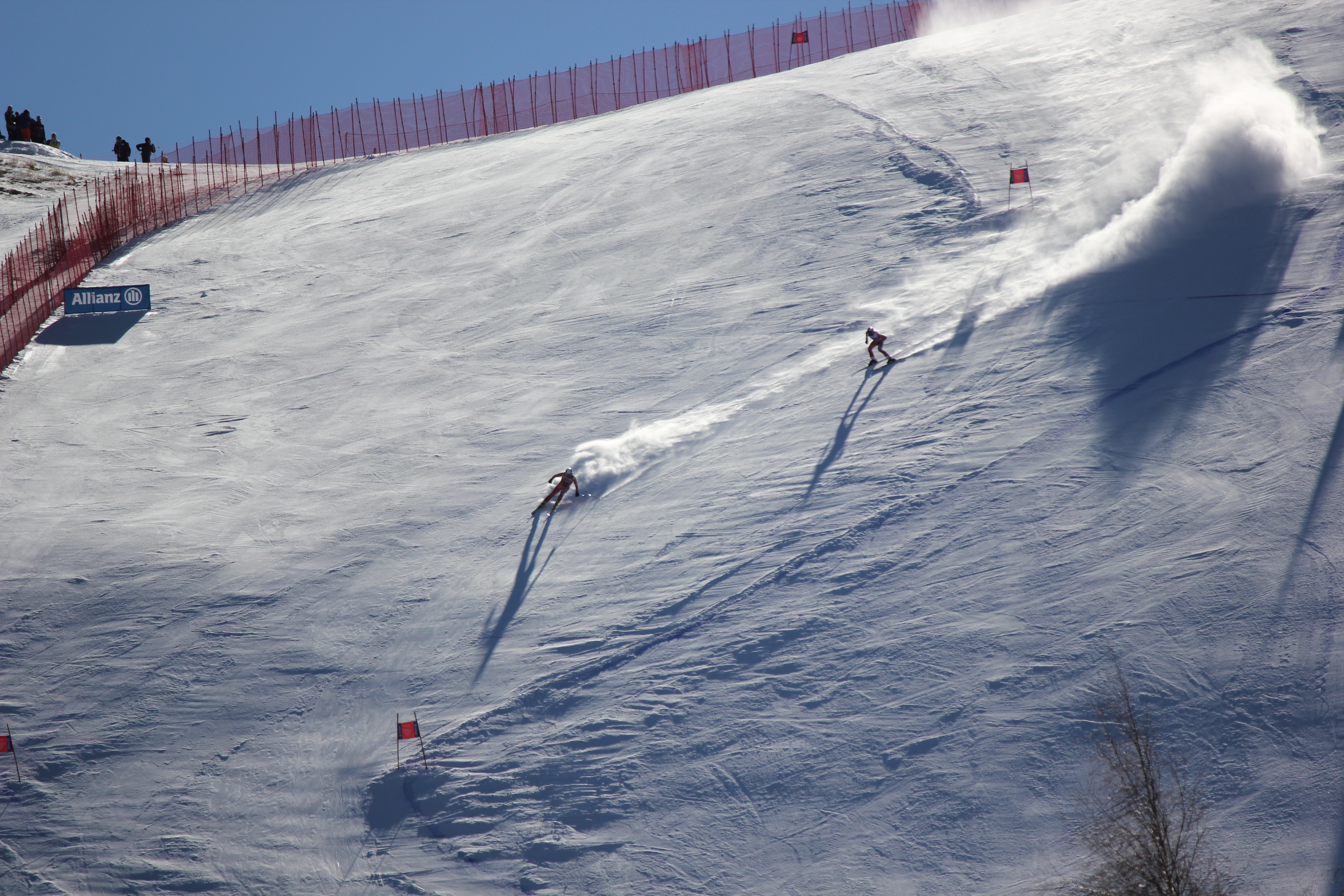
Gorce and Ferrer at the 2013 IPC Alpine World Championships in the downhill event

Before departing for Vancouver, he participated in a departure ceremony attended by State Secretary for Sport Jaime Lissavetzky, secretary general of Social Policy Francisco Moza, the President of the Spanish Paralympic Committee Miguel Carballeda, and managing director of the Spanish Paralympic Committee Alberto Jofre. His youth was one of the contributing factors in being chosen for the 2010 Paralympic team as the Spanish Paralympic Committee believed investing in him then would result in a skier who would be around for several Paralympic Games. The entire Spanish team arrived in Whistler ahead of the 2010 Games by 7 February. He was the youngest member of the Spanish team, competing as a nineteen-year-old. He was guided by Félix Aznar. Skier and guide shared a room in the Paralympic Village during the Games. Fog in Vancouver resulted in a change in scheduling for his ski events. At the 2010 Games, he and his guide were disqualified from the downhill event after missing a gate. He fell twice in two different events at the 2010 Games. Following the Games, the Spanish Paralympic team attended a welcome back celebration at the ONCE Foundation that was also attended by Infanta Elena, Duchess of Lugo.

Gorce played in Vancouver from 5 to 7 April 2010. It was organised by the Federación Española de Deportes de Personas con Discapacidad Física (FEDDF), Federación Española de Deportes para Paralíticos Cerebrales (FEDPC) yand Federación Española de Deportes para Ciegos (FEDC). He competed in a November 2010 ski competition in Landgraaf, Netherlands. He earned a gold medal in the downhill event while skiing with guide Arnau Ferrer. At the first World Cup event in the 2010/2011 season, which was held in Arta Terme, Italy, he was guided by Ferrer. The pair finished fifth in the first of the four events held. He participated in the 2012 Campeonatos de España de Esquí held in Valle de Arán, where the slalom, giant slalom and Super G events were contested. He finished second in all three events where Arnau Ferrer was his guide. At the 2011 World Championships held in Sestriere, Italy, he finished eighth in the Super G event. Near the end of the 2011/2012 ski season, he participated in a World Cup event in Italy where he failed to finish in the giant slalom event while skiing with guide Ferrer. At a January 2013 World Cup event in Switzerland, skiing with Ferrer, he finished sixth in the slalom event.

Gorce was a competitor in the Sochi 2014 Paralympic Winter Games, where he won a bronze medal in the men's combined – visually impaired.
