= Spanish Federation of Sportspeople with Cerebral Palsy =

Federación Española de Deportes de Paralíticos Cerebrales
- Purpose: Sports
- Region served: Spain

Spanish Federation of Sportspeople with the Cerebral Palsy (Spanish: Federación Española de Deportes de Paralíticos Cerebrales (FEDPC)) is the national sports federation for people with cerebral palsy. It is composed of regional federations. It supports a number of sports.

== Governance ==
FEDPC is one of five disability sport organizations that belongs to the Spanish Paralympic Committee. They have a goal of hosting and governing disability sport on the local level around the country. While the organization is a private non-profit entity, by law it also serves a public interest. FEDPC is composed of a number of regional cerebral palsy sport federations including Andalusian Federation of Cerebral Palsy Sports (FADPC) Balearic Islands Federation of Sports for Persons with Disabilities (FEBED), Canary Islands Sports Federation for Persons with Disabilities (FCDPD), Disability Sports Federation for Castile and Leon (FECLEDMI), Catalan Sports Federation of Cerebral Palsy (FECPC), Adapted Sports Federation of the Valencian Community (FESA), Extremadura Sports Federation of Cerebral Palsy (FEXDPC), Madrid Sports Federation for Cerebral Palsy (FMDPC), Federation of Adapted Sports Navarre (FNDA) and Adapted Sports Basque Federation (FVDA). The election of the oFEDPC's president occurs during Winter Paralympic Games years. The organization is a member of and complies with the World Anti-Doping Agency.

There are two major funding bodies for FEDPC, ONCE and the Consejo Superior de Deportes. Through the Spanish Paralympic Committee, one of their sponsors is Renfe Operadora.

The organization's website provides information about the rules of sports, a calendar of events, and information on classification.

== History ==
As a result of the increase in participation and interest in the disability during the late 1960s, then president of the Spanish Olympic Committee Juan Antonio Samaranch charged Guillermo Cabezas to create the Spanish Sports Federation for the Physically Disabled. While originally created only for people with physical disabilities, it soon became a catchall organization representing multiple disability types including people with cerebral palsy. In 1990, the General Law of Sports was passed, (Spanish: Ley General del Deporte) which led to changes in how sport was organized inside Spain. Eventually, changes in response to the law assisted in creating a landscape that resulted in the creation of several national Spanish disability sport organizations including this one, which was created in 1993. Prior to this, cerebral palsy sport in the country was handled by Federación ASPACE. At the time of its founding, Madrid had a regional federation for cerebral palsy sport, founded two years prior in 1991. The organization was originally named Spanish Sports Federation for Cerebral Palsy (Spanish: Federación Española de Deportes para Paralíticos Cerebrales). At the time of the organization's creation, it supported only athletics, cycling, table tennis, swimming, 7-a-side soccer, boccia, and skiing.

FEDPC amended its statues in September 1995, May 2005 February 2007, and June 2012.

In the first half of 1999, they received a grant from Ministry of Education and Culture (Spanish: Ministerio de Educación y Cultura) for 18,443,000 ₧. In the first half of 2000, they received a grant from the Ministry of Education, Culture and Sports (Spanish: Ministerio de Educación, Cultura y Deporte) for 19,000,000 ₧. In the second half of 2001, they received a grant from Ministry of Education, Culture and Sport (Spanish: Ministerio de Educación, Cultura y Deporte) for 13,500,000₧. In the fourth quarter of 2011, they received funding from the Ministry of Education, Culture and Sport (Spanish: Ministerio de Educación, Cultura y Deporte).

== Sports ==
Sports the organization supports include athletics, equestrian, cycling, swimming, boccia, table tennis, 7-a-side football, and powerchair football. There are eight classes of disability severity for competitions in Spain that are supported by FEDPC.

In 2007, FEDPC formally supported a number of sports including athletics, coccia, cycling, skiing, 7-a-side football, powerlifting, powerchair hockey, swimming, table tennis, archery and sailing. The organization had 18 representatives at the 2008 Summer Paralympics. In 2010, the Benasque Handix Foundation, Asociación Amigos Corazón Grande, Spanish Federation of Sports for Persons with Physical Disabilities (FEDDF), FEDPC and Spanish Blind Sports Federation (FEDC) were involved with organizing a national skiing competition in Benasque in which over 80 disability skiers participated.
