= Spanish Federation of Sports for the Deaf =

Federación Española de Deportes para Sordos
- Sport: Deaflympics
- Jurisdiction: Spain
- Abbreviation: FEDS
- Founded: 1993
- Affiliation: CISS
- Location: Córdoba, Spain
- President: Antonio Jesús de la Rosa del Pino
- Secretary: Roberto Sánchez Barea

Official website
- www.feds.es
- (Spain)

Spanish Federation of Sports for the Deaf (Spanish: Federación Española de Deportes para Sordos (FEDS)) is the national governing body for deaf sports in Spain. Based in Madrid and created in 1993, they are one of five disability sport organizations that are members of the Spanish Paralympic Committee.

The Spanish Federation of Sports for the Deaf is responsible for sending, supporting and funding deaf athletes representing Spain at the Deaflympics and in other Deaf Championships.

== Governance ==
FEDS is one of five disability sport organizations that belongs to the Spanish Paralympic Committee which has the goal of hosting and governing disability sport on the local level around the country. While it is a private organization, by law it has a public interest. They are based in Madrid. As of November 2013, Santiago Poveda García became the President of the organization.

The organization is composed of regional sport federations including the Catalan Federation for the Deaf Andalusian Federation of Sports for the Deaf. Deaf Sports Federation of the Principality of Asturias, Disabled Federation of Castilla-León, Galician Federation of Sports for the Deaf, Madrid Federation of Sports for the Deaf and FESA Division of the Deaf Valencia. Each autonomous region of Spain is allowed to have its own regional deaf sport organization belonging to FEDS. The presidents of these federations make up the general assembly for FEDS.

The organization is a member of the Spanish National Anti-Doping Commission. They are affiliated with International Committee of Sports for the Deaf (CISS), the International Committee of Deaf Chess (ICSC), the European Deaf Sports Organization (EDSO), the Spanish Olympic Committee (COE) and the Spanish Paralympic Committee (CPE). Through the Spanish Paralympic Committee, one of their sponsors is Renfe Operadora.

Sports the organization supports include athletics, basketball, cycling, tennis, table tennis, football, futsal, 7-a-side football and pétanque. For competition purposes in events organized by FEDS, sportspeople must have hearing loss of at least 55 decibels.

== History ==
The Spanish Committee of Silent Sports was created in 1949. Marcos Anavi Benavideste was the group's first president, a position he would stay in for ten years. As a result of the increase in participation and interest in the disability during the late 1960s, then president of the Spanish Olympic Committee Juan Antonio Samaranch charged Guillermo Cabezas to create the Spanish Sports Federation for the Physically Disabled. While originally created only for people with physical disabilities, it soon became a catchall organization representing multiple disability types including people with hearing impairments. In 1990, the General Law of Sports was passed, (Spanish: Ley General del Deporte) which led to changes in how sport was organized inside Spain. Eventually, changes in response to the law assisted in creating a landscape that resulted in the creation of several national Spanish disability sport organizations including this one, which was created in May 1993.
