= Sylvana Mestre =

Spanish Paralympic administrator

- Born: 1956 (age 69–70); Barcelona, Spain
- Known for: Chairperson of the International Paralympic Committee Alpine Skiing Sport Technical Committee
- Awards: Paralympic Order

Sylvana Mestre (born 1956) is a former chairperson of the International Paralympic Committee Alpine Skiing Sport Technical Committee. She was awarded the Paralympic Order in 2015.

== Early life ==
Mestre was born in Barcelona, Spain in 1956. She considers herself Catalan and has taught her daughters the language. Mestre admitted to having a difficult time learning both Catalan and Spanish in school after her family moved to Puigcerdà.

== Career ==
After her husband's death, Mestre began working as a guide, and later a trainer, for children with disabilities. She first participated in the Paralympic Games during the 1998 Winter Paralympics as a guide for visually impaired skiers. From there, she was appointed a member of the International Paralympic Committee Alpine Skiing Sport Technical Committee from 2002 to 2006 before being elected chairperson. While serving in her role as chairperson, Mestre co-founded a Spain-based program called Play and Train which provides disabled athletes a place to practice, learn and train and served as the Alpine Skiing Technical Director for the Spanish Sports Federation for the Blind until 2010. She was also elected to the World Anti-Doping Agency Education Committee. While on this committee, Mestre helped introduce stricter measures against doping such as increasing the sanction ban from two to four years.

In 2012, Mestre was awarded the “Spirit of Sport Award” for her commitment and humanitarian spirit by the Global Association of International Sports Federations and in 2013 was awarded the "2013 International Women’s Day Recognition Award" by the International Paralympic Committee Women in Sport Committee. After the 2014 Sport Technical Committee election, Mestre was replaced as chairperson and undertook a new role overseeing development and youth programmes. In 2015, she was awarded the Paralympic Order, the highest award of the International Paralympic Committee. In 2017, Mestre was the recipient of the Pitu Figueras Prize by the Winter Sports Catalan Federation. In 2018, Mestre was honoured with the "Mireia Tapiador Prize for the promotion of sport" by the City Council of Barcelona.
