= Jon Santacana =

Spanish para-alpine skier (born 1980)

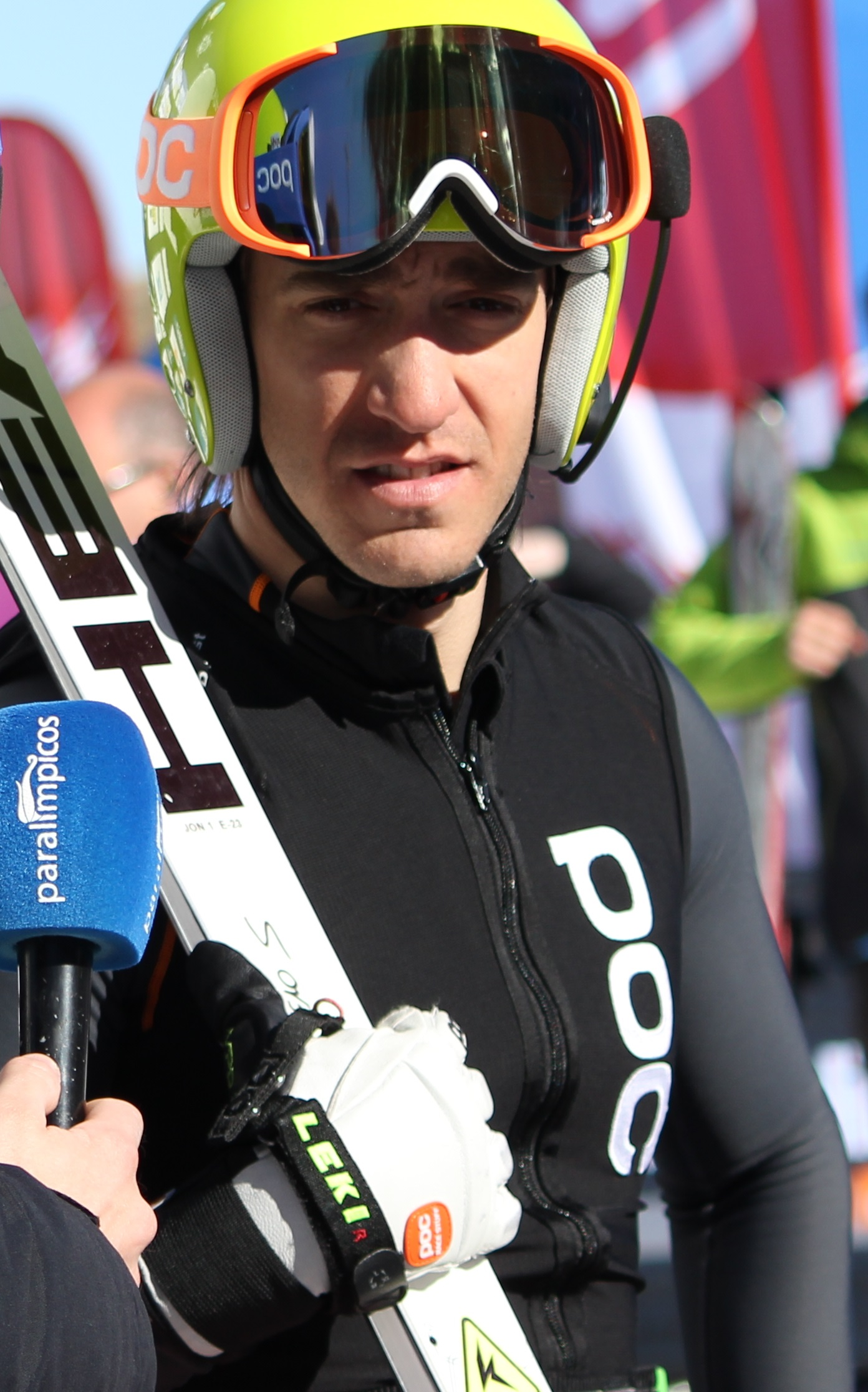
- Jon Santacana at the 2013 IPC World Championships held in La Molina, Spain.

Personal information
- Full name: Jon Santacana Maiztegui
- Nationality: Spanish
- Born: 1 November 1980 (age 45) San Sebestian, Guipúzcoa, Spain

Sport
- Country: Spain
- Sport: Alpine skiing
- Event(s): Downhill; Slalom; Giant slalom Super combined Super G
- Coached by: Jordi 'Carbu' Carbonell
Medal record
Men's para alpine skiing
Representing Spain
Paralympic Games
Gold medal – first place	2002 Salt Lake City	Giant slalom, visually impaired
Gold medal – first place	2010 Vancouver	Downhill, visually impaired
Gold medal – first place	2014 Sochi	Downhill, visually impaired
Silver medal – second place	2010 Vancouver	Slalom, visually impaired
Silver medal – second place	2010 Vancouver	Giant slalom, visually impaired
Silver medal – second place	2014 Sochi	Slalom, visually impaired
Silver medal – second place	2018 Pyeongchang	Super combined, visually impaired
Bronze medal – third place	2002 Salt Lake City	Downhill, visually impaired
Bronze medal – third place	2002 Salt Lake City	Super-G, visually impaired
World Championships
Gold medal – first place	2013 La Molina	Downhill, visually impaired
Gold medal – first place	2013 La Molina	Giant slalom, visually impaired
Silver medal – second place	2015 Panorama	Giant slalom, visually impaired
Silver medal – second place	2017 Tarvisio	Downhill, visually impaired
Silver medal – second place	2017 Tarvisio	Slalom, visually impaired
Bronze medal – third place	2015 Panorama	Super combined, visually impaired
Bronze medal – third place	2015 Panorama	Slalom, visually impaired
Bronze medal – third place	2017 Tarvisio	Giant slalom, visually impaired

Jon Santacana Maiztegui (born 1 November 1980) is a Spanish B2 classified visually impaired para-alpine skier. His sighted ski guide is Miguel Galindo Garces. Santacana has competed at the IPC Alpine Skiing World Championships, in the European Cup and the IPC Alpine Skiing World Cup, and Spanish national competitions. He represented Spain at the 2002 Winter Paralympics, 2006 Winter Paralympics and 2010 Winter Paralympics, earning a gold medal and a pair of silver medals at the 2010 Games.

== Personal ==
Santacana was born on 1 November 1980 in San Sebestian, Guipúzcoa, in the Basque region of Spain. As of 2012, he lives in Getxo, Vizcaya, Spain and is an INEF student.

Santacana has a vision impairment, which is the result of a genetic problem that manifested itself when he was eight years old.

== Skiing ==
Santacana is a B2 classified visually impaired skier. Miguel Galindo Garces is his guide.

Santacana earned a gold medal at the Switzerland hosted 2000 IPC Alpine Skiing World Championships. In 2005, while skiing at La Molina, Spain, he fell and seriously injured himself and was unable to ski until near the start of the 2006 Winter Paralympics.

Santacana earned a gold medal for the overall 2006/2007 European Cup season. He finished the 2006/2007 IPC Alpine Skiing World Cup season in second place. At the last round of the European Cup in March 2008, an event held in La Molina, he was one of several Spanish skiers competing. He finished the 2007/2008 European Cup season in second place after the five test events. Galindo was his guide for the season. He finished the 2007/2008 World Cup season in third place. At the conclusion of the first World Cup event in the 2008/2009 season, he sat in first place in the World Cup standings. It was his eighth career World Cup event. He earned a gold medal and two silver medals at the 2009 World Championships in South Korea. His first gold came in the Super Combined event. He was one of six skiers and four guides making up the Spanish team at the World Championships.

At the 2010 World Cup Alpine skiing for Disabled in Abtenau, Austria, Santacana and his guide earned a bronze in the giant slalom event following a first run where they finished fifth and a second run where they finished second. He was unable to compete in the Super Combined event because it was cancelled. He then competed in the third round of the European Cup later in January at La Molina. He finished fifth in the slalom event. At the final event of the 2009/2010 World Cup season, an event held in March 2010 in Aspen, Colorado, he earned a gold medal in one event with guide Galindo. This was the last major event before the 2010 Games. He also earned a bronze medal in the giant slalom event, while finishing sixth in the Super Combined. He came into the Aspen World Cup event with 625 World Cup points.

Santacana participated in an April 2010 Vancouver hosted competition organised by the Federación Española de Deportes de Personas con Discapacidad Física (FEDDF), Federación Española de Deportes para Paralíticos Cerebrales (FEDPC) and Federación Española de Deportes para Ciegos (FEDC). He competed in a November 2010 ski competition in Landgraaf, Netherlands where he earned a gold medal in the downhill event. At the first World Cup event in the 2010/2011 season, which was held in Arta Terme, Italy, Santacana and Galindo finished second in the first of the four events held. At the 2011 World Championships held in Sestriere, Italy, he finished first in the Super-G event. He participated in the 2012 Campeonatos de España de Esquí held in Valle de Arán, where the slalom, giant slalom and Super G events were contested. He won gold in all three events. Near the end of the 2011/2012 ski season, he participated in a World Cup event in Italy where he finished first in the giant slalom event in the men's vision impaired group. In September 2012, he tore his Achilles tendon. At a January 2013 World Cup event in Switzerland, skiing with Galindo, he earned a gold medal in the giant slalom event. While he did not medal in any other events at the competition, he maintained his place on the top of the World Cup leader board for the season. He won three gold medals at the IPC Alpine Skiing World Championships.

At the 2017 World Championships Santacana won two silver medals in the downhill, and slalom, a bronze medal in the giant slalom, and fished fourth in the super combined.

=== Paralympics ===
Santacana earned a gold medal and two bronzes at the 2002 Winter Paralympics.

In November 2009, Santacana attended an event in Madrid organised by Programa de Alto Rendimiento Paralímpico (Programa ARPA) as part of the preparation for the Vancouver Games. Before departing for Vancouver, he participated in a departure ceremony attended by State Secretary for Sport Jaime Lissavetzky, secretary general of Social Policy Francisco Moza, the President of the Spanish Paralympic Committee Miguel Carballeda, and managing director of the Spanish Paralympic Committee Alberto Jofre. The whole Spanish team arrived in Whistler ahead of the 2010 Games by 7 February.

His guide for the 2010 Winter Paralympics was Galindo. Fog in Vancouver resulted in a change in scheduling for his ski events. The pair won a gold medal in the men's vision impaired downhill event. His gold medal was the first gold won by a Spaniard at the Games. Going into Vancouver, he was ranked second in the world in the downhill. He was second in the first and second runs of the men's vision impaired giant slalom event. He finished fifth in the super giant event at the Games. He finished the 2010 Games with one gold medal and two silver medals. Following the Games, the Spanish Paralympic team attended a welcome back celebration at the ONCE Foundation that was also attended by Infanta Elena, Duchess of Lugo.

Games	Test	Place	Run	Time	Date
2010 Winter Paralympics	Downhill		End	1:18.23	18 March 2010
2010 Winter Paralympics	Slalom		2nd run	1:46.91	14 March 2010
2010 Winter Paralympics	Slalom	1	1st Round	0:49.88 Q	14 March 2010
2010 Winter Paralympics	Giant slalom		2nd run	2:42.20	16 March 2010
2010 Winter Paralympics	Giant slalom	2	1st Round	1:19.77 Q	16 March 2010
2010 Winter Paralympics	Super Combined		2nd run	DNF	20 March 2010
2010 Winter Paralympics	Super Combined	3	1st Round	1:24.87 Q	20 March 2010
2010 Winter Paralympics	Super Giant	5	End	1:23.21	19 March 2010
2006 Winter Paralympics	Slalom	7	2nd run	1:31.52	19 March 2006
2006 Winter Paralympics	Slalom	9	1st Round	49.03Q	19 March 2006
2006 Winter Paralympics	Giant slalom		1st Round	DNS	17 March 2006
2002 Winter Paralympics	Downhill		End	1:21.57	9 March 2002
2002 Winter Paralympics	Slalom		1st Round	DNF	16 March 2002
2002 Winter Paralympics	Giant slalom		2nd run	1:05.07	14 March 2002
2002 Winter Paralympics	Giant slalom		1st Round	1:03.26 Q	14 March 2002
2002 Winter Paralympics	Super Giant		End	1:11.22	11 March 2002
