= Miguel Galindo =

Spanish alpine skier and para-alpine sighted guide

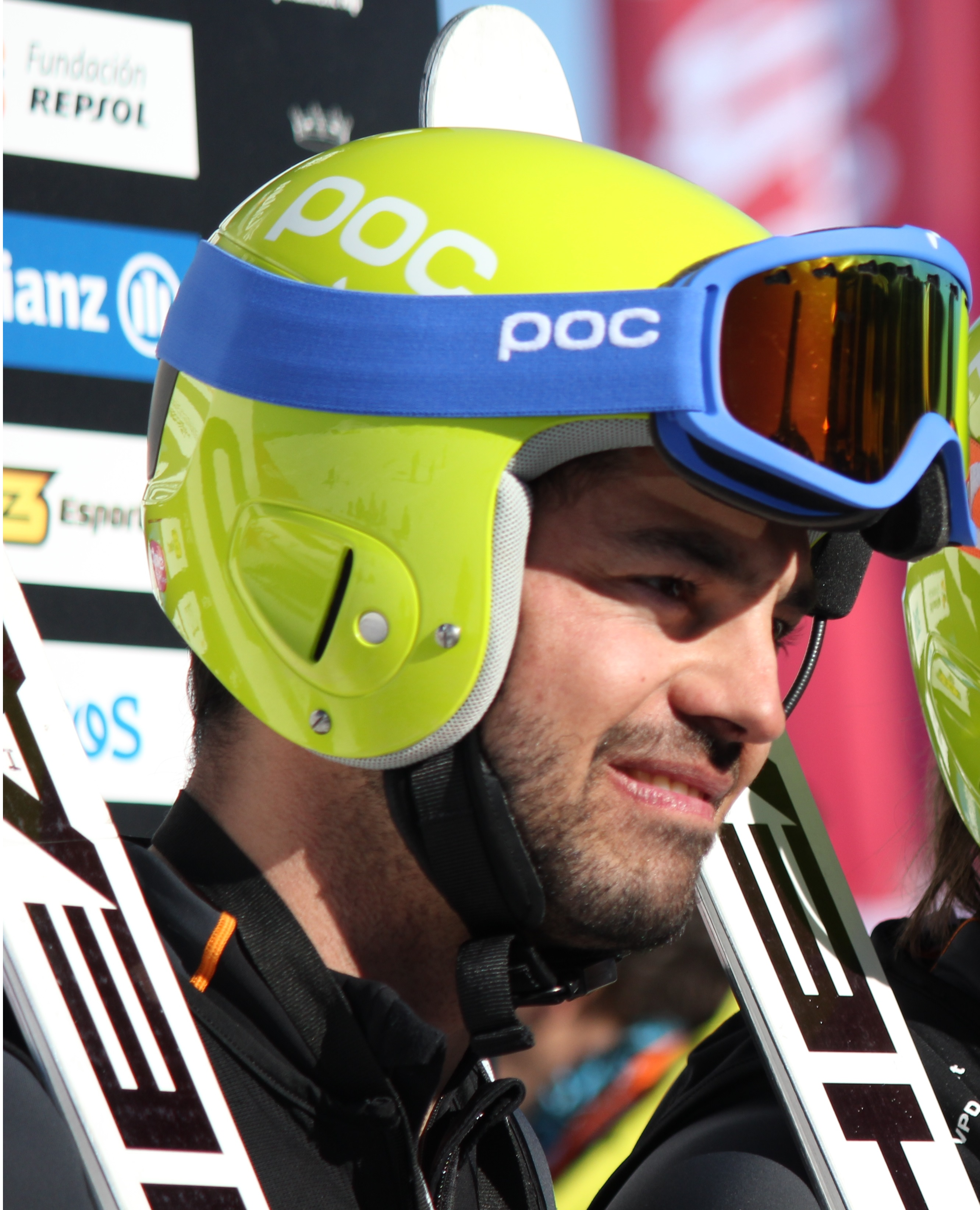
- Miguel Galindo at the 2013 IPC World Championships held at La Molina, Spain.

Personal information
- Nationality: Spanish
- Born: Miguel Galindo Garcés Spain

Sport
- Country: Spain
- Sport: Alpine skiing
- Event(s): Downhill; Slalom; Giant slalom Super combined Super G
Medal record
Men's Alpine skiing
Representing Spain
Paralympic Games
Gold medal – first place	2010 Vancouver	Downhill, visually impaired
Silver medal – second place	2010 Vancouver	Slalom, visually impaired
Silver medal – second place	2010 Vancouver	Giant slalom, visually impaired
Bronze medal – third place	2002 Salt Lake City	Alpine skiing
Bronze medal – third place	2002 Salt Lake City	Alpine skiing

Miguel Galindo Garcés is a Spanish alpine skier, and para-alpine sighted guide. As Jon Santacana's guide, he competed at the 2002 Winter Paralympics where he earned three medals. He also competed in the European Cup, the World Cup, the World Championships and a national team camp with Santacana.

== Personal ==
Galindo is from the Aragon region of Spain.

== Skiing ==
Galindo is the sighted ski guide for visually impaired skier Jon Santacana. In this role, he earned a gold medal at the Switzerland hosted 2000 World Championships. He earned a gold medal and two bronze medals at the 2002 Winter Paralympics.

Galindo earned a gold medal for the overall 2006/2007 European Cup season. During the following ski season he recovered from a knee injury. At the last round of the European Cup in March 2008, an event held in La Molina, Spain, he was one of several Spanish skiers competing. He finished the 2007/2008 European Cup season in second place after the five test events. Galindo continued to be Santacana's guide for that season. He earned a gold medal at the 2009 World Championships in South Korea. His first gold came in the super combined event. He was one of six skiers and four guides which made up the Spanish team.

In November 2009, Galindo attended an event in Madrid organised by Programa de Alto Rendimiento Paralímpico (Programa ARPA) as part of the preparation for the 2010 Winter Paralympics in Vancouver, Canada. At the 2010 World Cup Alpine skiing for Disabled in Abtenau, Austria, the pair earned a bronze in the giant slalom event following a first run where they finished fifth and a second run where they finished second. He was unable to compete in the super combined event because it was cancelled. He then competed in the third round of the European Cup later in January 2010 at La Molina. He finished fifth in the slalom event. At the final event of the 2009/2010 World Cup season, an event held in March 2010 in Aspen, Colorado, he earned a gold medal in one event while skiing with Santacana. This was the last major event before the 2010 Games. He also earned a bronze medal in the giant slalom event, while finishing sixth in the super combined. He came into the Aspen World Cup event with 625 World Cup points.

Going into Vancouver, Santacana and Galindo were ranked second in the world in the downhill. He guided Santacana during the 2010 Winter Paralympics. Before departing for Vancouver, he participated in a departure ceremony attended by State Secretary for Sport Jaime Lissavetzky, secretary general of Social Policy Francisco Moza, the President of the Spanish Paralympic Committee Miguel Carballeda, and managing director of the Spanish Paralympic Committee Alberto Jofre. The whole Spanish team arrived in Whistler ahead of the 2010 Games by 7 February. Fog in Vancouver resulted in a change in scheduling for his ski events. The pair won a gold medal in the men's vision impaired downhill event. His gold medal was the first gold medal won by a Spaniard at the Games. He finished the 2010 Games with one gold medal and two silver medals. Following the Games, the Spanish Paralympic team attended a welcome back celebration at the ONCE Foundation that was also attended by Infanta Elena, Duchess of Lugo.

Galindo participated in a Spanish national team competition from 5 to 7 April 2010 in Vancouver. It was organised by the Federación Española de Deportes de Personas con Discapacidad Física (FEDDF), Federación Española de Deportes para Paralíticos Cerebrales (FEDPC) and Federación Española de Deportes para Ciegos (FEDC). At the first World Cup event in the 2010/2011 season, which was held in Arta Terme, Italy, Santacana and Galindo finished second in the first of the four events held. At the 2011 World Championships held in Sestriere, Italy, he finished first in the super G event. He participated in the 2012 Los Campeonatos de España de Esquí held in Valle de Arán, where the slalom, giant slalom and super G events were contested. He won gold in all three events. Near the end of the 2011/2012 ski season, he participated in a World Cup event in Italy where he finished first in the giant slalom event in the men's vision impaired group. At a January 2013 World Cup event in Switzerland, skiing with Santacana, he earned a gold medal in the giant slalom event. While he did not medal in any other events at the competition, they maintained their place on the top of the World Cup leader board for the season.
