= Paralympic Winter World Cup =

The Paralympic Winter World Cup is a biannual international multi-sport event where athletes with a disability compete. The World Cup has been hosted in Sollefteå, Sweden since 2009. It is organized by the Swedish Paralympic Committee (SPC) in coordination with the International Paralympic Committee (IPC).

== History ==
The Paralympic Winter World Cup replaced the Sollefteå Winter Games, that had taken place biannually since 1995.

== Sports ==
- Alpine skiing (2009–present)
- Biathlon (2009–present)
- Cross-country skiing (2009–present)
- Ice sledge hockey (2009–present)

== Editions ==
Games	Date	Nations	Athletes	Sports	Notes
2009 Paralympic Winter World Cup	3- February	26	ca 350	4	
2011 Paralympic Winter World Cup	12–20 February	19		4	Included the 2011 IPC Ice Sledge Hockey European Championships

== See also ==
- Paralympic World Cup
- Paralympic Games
