= Spanish Sports Federation for Persons with Physical Disabilities =

Federación Española de Deportes de Personas con Discapacidad Física
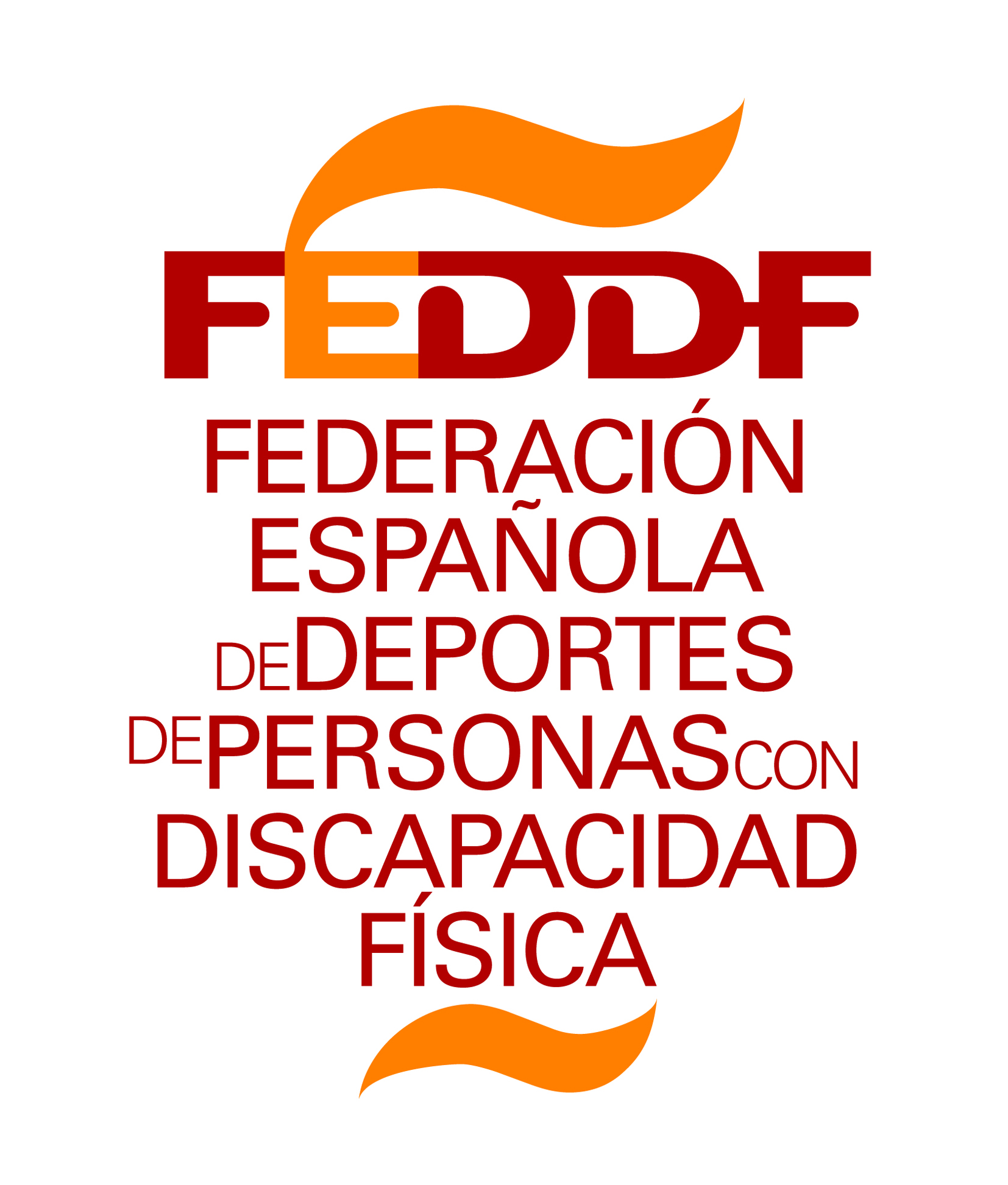
- Purpose: Sports
- Region served: Spain

Spanish Sports Federation for Persons with Physical Disabilities (Spanish: Federación Española de Deportes de Personas con Discapacidad Física (FEDDF)) is one of five disability sport organizations aligned with the Spanish Paralympic Committee that works towards support disability sport in Spain, and in this case specifically for people with physical disabilities.

== Governance ==
FEDDF is one of five disability sport organizations that belongs to the Spanish Paralympic Committee. They have a goal of hosting and governing disability sport on the local level around the country. The organization is composed of regional sport federations including the Catalan Federation for the Physically Disabled and Andalusian Federation of Sports for the Physically Disabled.

There are two major funding bodies for FEDDF, ONCE and the Consejo Superior de Deportes. Through the Spanish Paralympic Committee, one of their sponsors is Renfe Operadora.

== History ==
In 1968, as a result of the increase in participation and interest in disability sport, then president of the Spanish Olympic Committee Juan Antonio Samaranch directed Guillermo Cabezas to create the Spanish Sports Federation for Persons with Physical Disabilities. While originally created only for people with physical disabilities, it soon became a catchall organization representing multiple disability types. In 1990, the General Law of Sports was passed, (Spanish: Ley General del Deporte) which led to changes in how sport was organized inside Spain. Eventually, changes in response to the law assisted in creating a landscape that resulted in the creation of several national Spanish disability sport organizations, removing responsibility of governance for other disability types from this organization. The organization was originally named Spanish Sports Federation for the Physically Disabled (Spanish: Federación Española de Deportes para Minusválidos Físicos). They officially changed to their current name in November 2007.

In September 1992, the first Paralympic Congress was held in Barcelona. ONCE, FEDMF and ASPACE were the three Spanish disability sport organizations key to hosting the event, which was attended by over 800 people from 86 countries.

In the first half of 1999, they received a grant from Ministry of Education and Culture (Spanish: Ministerio de Educación y Cultura) for 779,000 ₧ and another for 40,248,000. In the first half of 2000, they received a grant from the Ministry of Education, Culture and Sports (Spanish: Ministerio de Educación, Cultura y Deporte) for 49,000,000 ₧. In the second half of 2001, they received a grant from Ministry of Education, Culture and Sport (Spanish: Ministerio de Educación, Cultura y Deporte) for 23,250,000 ₧. In the fourth quarter of 2011, they received funding from the Ministry of Education, Culture and Sport (Spanish: Ministerio de Educación, Cultura y Deporte).

== Sports ==
Sports FEDDF supports include athletics, wheelchair basketball, cycling, fencing, winter sport, swimming, boccia, wheelchair tennis, table tennis, sports shooting, archery, volleyball, powerlifting and sailing.

In 1991, the Catalan Tennis Federation began to work on integrating wheelchair tennis into its organization. By 1995, the Royal Spanish Tennis Federation and International Tennis Federation also began working on integration. FEDDF built wheelchair tennis into the organization based on these examples of integration attempts. The partnership between the Royal Spanish Tennis Federation and FEDMF provided additional funding and competition opportunities for FEDMF wheelchair tennis players.

The organization had 58 representatives at the 2008 Summer Paralympics. In 2010, the Benasque Handix Foundation, Asociación Amigos Corazón Grande, Spanish Federation of Sports for Persons with Physical Disabilities (FEDDF) Spanish Sports Federation for Cerebral Palsy (FEDPC) and Spanish Blind Sports Federation (FEDC) were involved with organizing a national skiing competition in Benasque in which over 80 disability skiers participated.
