= Spanish Paralympic Committee =

National Paralympic Committee of Spain

National Paralympic Committee
- Country: Spain
- Code: ESP
- Created: 1995
- Continental association: EPC
- Headquarters: Madrid, Spain
- President: Miguel Carballeda Piñeiro
- Secretary General: Miguel Sagarra Gadea
- Website: www.paralimpicos.es

Spanish Paralympic Committee (Spanish: Comité Paralímpico Español, CPE) is a Spanish non-profit sport organisation founded in 1995, that oversees five national disability sport federations. The organisation has a secretary general and a president. Since 2005, they have been supported by Plan ADO. In 2000, the CPE was involved in a cheating scandal at the 2000 Summer Paralympics.

== History ==
The CPE was created in 1995 in response to the success of Spanish competitors at the 1992 Summer Paralympics. Organización Nacional de Ciegos Españoles (ONCE) assisted in setting up the CPE. In 1998, the Spanish government changed the laws, which impacted the status of the CPE to recognise it as equal to that of the Spanish Olympic Committee. At the same time, the organisation was received legal status, "declaración de utilidad pública", as being useful to the general public.

== Governance and funding ==
The organisation is a non-profit, and is set up and taxed in the same manner as the Spanish Olympic Committee. Income by the CPE are not subject 40% tax levied by the national government on admission fees for organisations except in the cases of sporting events.

The CPE includes the five Spanish disability sport federations, which represent over 13,000 sportspeople, to host and govern disability sport on the local level around the country. They are the Federación Española de Deportes para Ciegos (FEDC), Federación Española de Deportes de Personas con Discapacidad Física (FEDDF), Federación Española de Deportes para Discapacitados Intelectuales (FEDDI), Federación Española de Deportes para Sordos (FEDS) and Federación Española de Deportes de Paralíticos Cerebrales (FEDPC).

Since 2005, as a result of Plan ADO, the CPE received additional institutional and financial support from companies and businesses in sponsoring athletes, events, federations and teams. Between 2005 and 2008, including in Plan ADO brought in an additional €17.5 million to support preparations for the Spanish Paralympic team delegations at the 2006 Winter Paralympics, 2008 Summer Paralympics and 2010 Winter Paralympics. The funds directly benefited 390 competitors and 135 technical support personnel like coaches. The CPE manages the allocation of the Plan ADO funding to athletes and others.

In 2013, CPE Secretary General Miguel Segarra accompanied the Madrid 2020 Olympic and Paralympic Bid Delegation to Bonn to submit the city's bid for the Games.

== Board members ==
Past members of the board include Fernando Vicente Martin, who was the committee's vice president in the late 1990s. The President was in 2008 and 2009 Miguel Carballeda. Miguel Segarra was the Committee's Secretary General in 2008 and 2009, a role he continued to hold in 2013.

Infanta Elena, Duchess of Lugo is the Honorary President of the Spanish Paralympic Committee. In this role she has led the Spanish delegation at the 2008 Summer Paralympics.

== Scandal ==
Following the 2000 Summer Paralympics, Fernando Vicente Martin was expelled from the board of the Committee because they found him to be one of the biggest participants in fraudulent activities involving the Spanish delegation at the Games, following an investigation initiated in November 2000 at the behest of the International Paralympic Committee. The Committee found that 10 of the 12 members of the Spanish intellectually disabled basketball team did not meet the standards for such players. The Committee also ordered members of the ID basketball team to return the gold medal they won at the 2000 Games.

== See also ==
- Spain at the Paralympics
