= 2011 IPC Alpine Skiing World Championships – Slalom =

Slalom at the 2011 IPC Alpine Skiing World Championships
- Alpine skiing
- Venue: Kandahar Banchetta Giovanni N.
- Location: Sestriere
- Date: January 20

The Slalom competitions of the 2011 IPC Alpine Skiing World Championships were held at Kandahar Banchetta Giovanni N., in Sestriere, Italy on January 20.

== Women ==
=== Visually impaired ===
In the slalom visually impaired, the athlete with a visual impairment has a sighted guide. The two skiers are considered a team, and dual medals are awarded.

Rank	Bib	Name	Country	Run 1	Rank	Run 2	Rank	Total	Difference
1st place, gold medalist(s)	4	Henrieta Farkasova; Guide: Natalia Subrtova	Slovakia	50.67	1	52.04	1	1:42.71	
2nd place, silver medalist(s)	5	Kelly Gallagher; Guide: Charlotte Evans	United Kingdom	53.20	2	54.47	2	1:47.67	+4.96
3rd place, bronze medalist(s)	2	Alexandra Frantseva; Guide: Evgenia Kolosovskaya	Russia	54.02	3	55.96	4	1:49.98	+7.27
4	6	Melissa Perrine; Guide: Andrew Bor	Australia	55.53	4	55.64	3	1:51.17	+8.46
5	3	Natasha de Troyer; Guide: Werner de Troyer	Belgium	56.76	5	58.53	5	1:55.29	+12.58
6	1	Danelle Umstead; Guide: Robert Umstead	United States	1:09.40	6	59.57	6	2:08.97	+26.26
7	7	Anna Kuliskova; Guide: Michaela Hubacova	Czech Republic	1:13.21	7	1:10.55	7	2:23.76	+41.05

=== Standing ===
Rank	Bib	Name	Country	Run 1	Rank	Run 2	Rank	Total	Difference
1st place, gold medalist(s)	10	Andrea Rothfuss	Germany	49.38	1	50.60	1	1:39.98	
2nd place, silver medalist(s)	12	Petra Smarzova	Slovakia	52.50	3	51.22	2	1:43.72	+3.74
3rd place, bronze medalist(s)	11	Karolina Wisniewska	Canada	52.17	2	53.36	4	1:45.53	+5.55
4	15	Melania Corradini	Italy	54.72	5	52.95	3	1:47.67	+7.69
5	13	Solène Jambaqué	France	53.95	4	54.68	5	1:48.63	+8.65
6	18	Mariya Papulova	Russia	55.35	6	55.96	7	1:51.31	+11.33
7	9	Katja Saarinen	Finland	56.45	7	55.07	6	1:51.52	+11.54
8	14	Anna Jochemsen	Netherlands	1:00.09	8	57.21	8	1:57.30	+17.32
9	17	Elena Kudyakova	Russia	1:00.65	9	1:00.21	9	2:00.86	+20.88
	16	Ursula Pueyo Marimon	Spain	DNF					
	8	Danja Haslacher	Austria	DNS					

=== Sitting ===
Rank	Bib	Name	Country	Run 1	Rank	Run 2	Rank	Total	Difference
1st place, gold medalist(s)	21	Anna Schaffelhuber	Germany	53.99	1	54.81	1	1:48.80	
2nd place, silver medalist(s)	19	Claudia Loesch	Austria	55.31	2	57.31	2	1:52.62	+3.82
3rd place, bronze medalist(s)	20	Alana Nichols	United States	1:07.69	3	1:19.80	3	2:27.49	+38.69
	22	Anna Turney	United Kingdom	DNF					

== Men ==
=== Visually impaired ===
In the slalom visually impaired, the athlete with a visual impairment has a sighted guide. The two skiers are considered a team, and dual medals are awarded.

Rank	Bib	Name	Country	Run 1	Rank	Run 2	Rank	Total	Difference
1st place, gold medalist(s)	33	Jakub Krako; Guide: Dusan Simo	Slovakia	44.29	2	44.54	1	1:28.83	
2nd place, silver medalist(s)	27	Yon Santacana Maiztegui; Guide: Miguel Galindo Garces	Spain	44.09	1	45.02	2	1:29.11	+0.28
3rd place, bronze medalist(s)	31	Chris Williamson; Guide: Robin Femy	Canada	45.65	3	45.03	3	1:30.68	+1.85
4	34	Nicolas Berejny; Guide: Gregory Nouhaud	France	45.77	4	46.05	4	1:31.82	+2.99
5	25	Radomir Dudas; Guide: Maros Hudik	Slovakia	46.82	6	46.17	5	1:32.99	+4.16
6	26	Ivan Frantsev; Guide: Evgeny Pinaev	Russia	46.31	5	46.98	7	1:33.29	+4.46
7	32	Norbert Holik; Guide: Lubos Bosela	Slovakia	47.44	7	46.57	6	1:34.01	+5.18
8	29	Valery Redkozubov; Guide: Viacheslav Molodtsov	Russia	47.45	8	47.71	8	1:35.16	+6.33
9	28	Gabriel Juan Gorce Yepes; Guide: Josep Arnau Ferrer Ventura	Spain	47.87	10	48.91	9	1:36.78	+7.95
10	23	Michal Beladic; Guide: Martin Pavlak	Slovakia	49.39	11	50.31	10	1:39.70	+10.87
11	35	Mikhail Simanov; Guide: Dmitry Smirnov	Russia	59.72	12	1:01.06	11	2:00.78	+31.95
	36	Marek Kubacka; Guide:	Slovakia	DNF					
	37	Luigi Bertanza; Guide:	Italy	DNS					
	24	Daniel Cintula; Guide: Mario Babinsky	Slovakia	DNS					
	30	Miroslav Haraus; Guide: Martin Makovnik	Slovakia			DNF			

=== Standing ===
Rank	Bib	Name	Country	Run 1	Rank	Run 2	Rank	Total	Difference
1st place, gold medalist(s)	38	Vincent Gauthier-Manuel	France	44.19	4	42.86	1	1:27.05	
2nd place, silver medalist(s)	49	Gerd Schönfelder	Germany	43.83	1	43.39	3	1:27.22	+0.17
3rd place, bronze medalist(s)	44	Toby Kane	Australia	45.19	8	43.30	2	1:28.49	+1.44
4	41	Cameron Rahles-Rahbula	Australia	44.77	6	43.89	4	1:28.66	+1.61
5	43	Michael Bruegger	Switzerland	44.14	2	44.95	6	1:29.09	+2.04
6	39	Alexandr Alyabyev	Russia	45.15	7	44.00	5	1:29.15	+2.10
7	53	Mitchell Gourley	Australia	44.56	5	45.05	7	1:29.61	+2.56
8	42	Thomas Pfyl	Switzerland	44.18	3	45.49	9	1:29.67	+2.62
9	48	Matt Hallat	Canada	46.12	10	45.17	8	1:31.29	+4.24
10	50	Adam Hall	New Zealand	45.34	9	46.00	11	1:31.34	+4.29
11	52	Hiraku Misawa	Japan	46.33	11	45.62	10	1:31.95	+4.90
12	51	Andreas Preiss	Austria	46.51	13	46.16	12	1:32.67	+5.62
13	46	Martin Falch	Austria	46.33	11	46.95	13	1:33.28	+6.23
14	47	Stanislav Loska	Czech Republic	47.89	14	47.73	14	1:35.62	+8.57
15	57	Aleksandr Vetrov	Russia	48.95	15	49.47	16	1:38.42	+11.37
16	55	Kirk Schornstein	Canada	50.68	18	49.32	15	1:40.00	+12.95
17	56	Martin France	Slovakia	50.66	17	50.05	17	1:40.71	+13.66
18	59	Jacob Guilera Casas	Spain	50.01	16	51.01	18	1:41.02	+13.97
19	58	Hansjoerg Lantschner	Italy	51.31	19	51.21	19	1:42.52	+15.47
20	60	Bart Verbruggen	Netherlands	51.86	20	51.71	21	1:43.57	+16.52
21	40	Ralph Green	United States	1:00.44	22	51.68	20	1:52.12	+25.07
22	61	Martin Hewitt	United Kingdom	57.75	21	57.43	22	1:55.18	+28.13
	62	Ugo Bregant	Italy	DNF					
	54	Wolfgang Moosbrugger	Austria	DNF					
	45	Markus Salcher	Austria	DNS					

=== Sitting ===
Rank	Bib	Name	Country	Run 1	Rank	Run 2	Rank	Total	Difference
1st place, gold medalist(s)	69	Takeshi Suzuki	Japan	43.64	1	45.67	1	1:29.31	
2nd place, silver medalist(s)	77	Yohann Taberlet	France	46.04	2	46.20	2	1:32.24	+2.93
3rd place, bronze medalist(s)	76	Thomas Nolte	Germany	46.82	4	46.94	4	1:33.76	+4.45
4	73	Philipp Bonadimann	Austria	47.40	6	46.65	3	1:34.05	+4.74
5	88	Roman Rabl	Austria	48.48	8	48.77	8	1:37.25	+7.94
6	67	Sean Rose	United Kingdom	49.37	10	48.55	7	1:37.92	+8.61
7	66	Taiki Morii	Japan	49.60	11	48.51	6	1:38.11	+8.80
8	63	Tyler Walker	United States	50.79	12	48.45	5	1:39.24	+9.93
9	81	Sang Min Han	South Korea	48.76	9	51.57	10	1:40.33	+11.02
10	82	Frederic Francois	France	47.87	7	53.05	13	1:40.92	+11.61
11	75	Dietmar Dorn	Austria	50.79	12	51.23	9	1:42.02	+12.71
12	72	Christopher Devlin-Young	United States	51.10	14	52.42	12	1:43.52	+14.21
13	87	Dino Sokolovic	Croatia	53.70	17	55.72	14	1:49.42	+20.11
14	83	Jong Seork Park	South Korea	52.46	16	57.02	15	1:49.48	+20.17
15	79	Jasmin Bambur	Serbia	1:00.54	19	51.88	11	1:52.42	+23.11
16	92	Simon Jacobsen	Sweden	59.50	18	1:02.47	18	2:01.97	+32.66
17	91	Enrico Giorge	Italy	1:02.87	21	1:01.50	17	2:04.37	+35.06
18	90	Oscar Espallargas	Spain	1:01.86	20	1:07.01	19	2:08.87	+39.56
19	95	Michael Brennan	United Kingdom	1:14.35	25	1:00.99	16	2:15.34	+46.03
20	93	Peter Dunning	United Kingdom	1:04.34	22	1:22.09	20	2:26.43	+57.12
	94	Gal Jakic	Slovenia	DNF					
	89	Oldrich Jelinek	Czech Republic	DNF					
	80	Akira Taniguchi	Japan	DNF					
	78	Franz Hanfstingl	Germany	DNF					
	74	Scott Meyer	United States	DNF					
	71	Andreas Kapfinger	Austria	DNF					
	70	Jean Yves Le Meur	France	DNF					
	68	Akira Kano	Japan	DNS					
	86	Miroslav Sperk	Czech Republic			DNF			
	84	Georg Kreiter	Germany			DNF			
	65	Cyril More	France			DNF			
	64	Josh Dueck	Canada			DNF			
	85	Kees-Jan van der Klooster	Netherlands			DNS			
