= 2011 IPC Alpine Skiing World Championships – Giant slalom =

Giant slalom at the 2011 IPC Alpine Skiing World Championships
- Alpine skiing
- Venue: Kandahar Banchetta Giovanni N.
- Location: Sestriere
- Date: January 22

The Giant slalom competitions of the 2011 IPC Alpine Skiing World Championships were held at Kandahar Banchetta Giovanni N., in Sestriere, Italy on January 22.

== Women ==
=== Visually impaired ===
In the giant slalom visually impaired, the athlete with a visual impairment has a sighted guide. The two skiers are considered a team, and dual medals are awarded.

Rank	Bib	Name	Country	Run 1	Rank	Run 2	Rank	Total	Difference
1st place, gold medalist(s)	1	Henrieta Farkasova; Guide: Natalia Subrtova	Slovakia	1:08.27	1	1:10.93	1	2:19.20	
2nd place, silver medalist(s)	5	Alexandra Frantseva; Guide: Evgenia Kolosovskaya	Russia	1:12.10	2	1:16.63	2	2:28.73	+9.53
3rd place, bronze medalist(s)	2	Kelly Gallagher; Guide: Charlotte Evans	United Kingdom	1:13.96	3	1:17.72	3	2:31.68	+12.48
4	7	Melissa Perrine; Guide: Andrew Bor	Australia	1:18.44	4	1:22.25	5	2:40.69	+21.49
5	4	Natasha de Troyer; Guide: Werner de Troyer	Belgium	1:20.75	6	1:22.99	6	2:43.74	+24.54
6	3	Anna Kuliskova; Guide: Michaela Hubacova	Czech Republic	1:24.40	7	1:20.18	4	2:44.58	+25.38
7	8	Gemma Pedrini; Guide: Ivan Morlotti	Italy	1:27.51	8	1:36.04	7	3:03.55	+44.35
	6	Danelle Umstead; Guide: Robert Umstead	United States			DNS			

=== Standing ===
Rank	Bib	Name	Country	Run 1	Rank	Run 2	Rank	Total	Difference
1st place, gold medalist(s)	13	Marie Bochet	France	1:10.65	2	1:12.67	1	2:23.32	
2nd place, silver medalist(s)	15	Petra Smarzova	Slovakia	1:10.71	3	1:13.84	2	2:24.55	+1.23
3rd place, bronze medalist(s)	14	Andrea Rothfuss	Germany	1:10.52	1	1:14.47	3	2:24.99	+1.67
4	9	Solène Jambaqué	France	1:10.92	4	1:14.56	4	2:25.48	+2.16
5	10	Melania Corradini	Italy	1:11.45	5	1:16.28	6	2:27.73	+4.41
6	11	Karolina Wisniewska	Canada	1:13.24	6	1:16.10	5	2:29.34	+6.02
7	20	Mariya Papulova	Russia	1:19.14	8	1:20.20	7	2:39.34	+16.02
8	16	Anna Jochemsen	Netherlands	1:19.20	9	1:24.73	8	2:43.93	+20.61
9	18	Ursula Pueyo Marimon	Spain	1:22.64	10	1:29.39	9	2:52.03	+28.71
10	19	Elena Kudyakova	Russia	1:23.31	11	1:37.47	10	3:00.78	+37.46
	12	Danja Haslacher	Austria	DNS					
	17	Katja Saarinen	Finland			DNF			

=== Sitting ===
Rank	Bib	Name	Country	Run 1	Rank	Run 2	Rank	Total	Difference
1st place, gold medalist(s)	24	Anna Schaffelhuber	Germany	1:12.69	1	1:19.04	2	2:31.73	
2nd place, silver medalist(s)	23	Claudia Loesch	Austria	1:13.91	2	1:18.52	1	2:32.43	+0.70
3rd place, bronze medalist(s)	22	Alana Nichols	United States	1:17.16	3	1:21.06	3	2:38.22	+6.49
4	25	Anna Turney	United Kingdom	1:29.57	5	1:58.29	4	3:27.86	+56.13
	21	Laurie Stephens	United States			DNF			

== Men ==
=== Visually impaired ===
In the giant slalom visually impaired, the athlete with a visual impairment has a sighted guide. The two skiers are considered a team, and dual medals are awarded.

Rank	Bib	Name	Country	Run 1	Rank	Run 2	Rank	Total	Difference
1st place, gold medalist(s)	26	Yon Santacana Maiztegui; Guide: Miguel Galindo Garces	Spain	1:03.76	1	1:07.02	1	2:10.78	
2nd place, silver medalist(s)	35	Jakub Krako; Guide: Dusan Simo	Slovakia	1:04.50	3	1:07.60	2	2:12.10	+1.32
3rd place, bronze medalist(s)	30	Radomir Dudas; Guide: Maros Hudik	Slovakia	1:07.22	5	1:10.20	3	2:17.42	+6.64
4	38	Nicolas Berejny; Guide: Gregory Nouhaud	France	1:06.07	4	1:11.50	6	2:17.57	+6.79
5	39	Ivan Frantsev; Guide: Evgeny Pinaev	Russia	1:09.05	7	1:10.88	4	2:19.93	+9.15
6	28	Miroslav Haraus; Guide: Martin Makovnik	Slovakia	1:10.81	9	1:11.19	5	2:22.00	+11.22
7	34	Marek Kubacka; Guide: Branislav Mazgut	Slovakia	1:10.04	8	1:12.98	8	2:23.02	+12.24
8	32	Valery Redkozubov; Guide: Viacheslav Molodtsov	Russia	1:12.16	10	1:12.36	7	2:24.52	+13.74
9	36	Michal Beladic; Guide: Martin Pavlak	Slovakia	1:13.73	12	1:14.79	9	2:28.52	+17.74
10	27	Daniel Cintula; Guide: Michal Cerven	Slovakia	1:12.88	11	1:18.42	10	2:31.30	+20.52
11	40	Mikhail Simanov; Guide: Dmitry Smirnov	Russia	1:22.74	13	1:24.20	11	2:46.94	+36.16
	41	Luigi Bertanza; Guide:	Italy	DNF					
	37	Christoph Prettner; Guide:	Austria	DNF					
	31	Gabriel Juan Gorce Yepes; Guide: Josep Arnau Ferrer Ventura	Spain	DNF					
	33	Chris Williamson; Guide: Robin Femy	Canada			DNS			
	29	Norbert Holik; Guide: Lubos Bosela	Slovakia			DNF			

=== Standing ===
Rank	Bib	Name	Country	Run 1	Rank	Run 2	Rank	Total	Difference
1st place, gold medalist(s)	44	Vincent Gauthier-Manuel	France	1:03.32	1	1:07.66	2	2:10.98	
2nd place, silver medalist(s)	48	Thomas Pfyl	Switzerland	1:03.33	2	1:08.08	3	2:11.41	+0.43
3rd place, bronze medalist(s)	56	Gerd Schönfelder	Germany	1:04.26	3	1:07.21	1	2:11.47	+0.49
4	51	Alexandr Alyabyev	Russia	1:04.46	4	1:09.46	5	2:13.92	+2.94
5	45	Mitchell Gourley	Australia	1:04.96	5	1:09.45	4	2:14.41	+3.43
6	49	Markus Salcher	Austria	1:06.27	8	1:09.77	6	2:16.04	+5.06
7	50	Lionel Brun	France	1:06.03	7	1:10.43	7	2:16.46	+5.48
8	46	Cameron Rahles-Rahbula	Australia	1:05.80	6	1:11.97	12	2:17.77	+6.79
9	55	Michael Bruegger	Switzerland	1:07.11	9	1:10.91	8	2:18.02	+7.04
10	47	Toby Kane	Australia	1:07.67	11	1:11.31	9	2:18.98	+8.00
11	42	Andreas Preiss	Austria	1:07.14	10	1:12.53	14	2:19.67	+8.69
12	53	Stanislav Loska	Czech Republic	1:08.56	12	1:11.50	10	2:20.06	+9.08
13	43	Hiraku Misawa	Japan	1:08.92	13	1:11.56	11	2:20.48	+9.50
14	59	Kirk Schornstein	Canada	1:09.94	16	1:12.25	13	2:22.19	+11.21
15	61	Martin Falch	Austria	1:09.63	14	1:13.50	15	2:23.13	+12.15
16	52	Martin France	Slovakia	1:09.76	15	1:13.97	16	2:23.73	+12.75
17	62	Aleksandr Vetrov	Russia	1:11.23	18	1:14.00	17	2:25.23	+14.25
18	65	Hansjoerg Lantschner	Italy	1:10.07	17	1:17.67	19	2:27.74	+16.76
19	58	Jacob Guilera Casas	Spain	1:11.86	19	1:16.94	18	2:28.80	+17.82
20	63	Bernhard Habersatter	Austria	1:13.92	20	1:17.81	20	2:31.73	+20.75
21	64	Ralph Green	United States	1:14.23	21	1:19.44	21	2:33.67	+22.69
22	66	Ugo Bregant	Italy	1:18.33	22	1:22.09	22	2:40.42	+29.44
23	67	Martin Hewitt	United Kingdom	1:19.99	23	1:23.29	23	2:43.28	+32.30
	60	Wolfgang Moosbrugger	Austria	DNS					
	57	Bart Verbruggen	Netherlands	DNF					
	54	Matt Hallat	Canada	DNF					

=== Sitting ===
Rank	Bib	Name	Country	Run 1	Rank	Run 2	Rank	Total	Difference
1st place, gold medalist(s)	79	Taiki Morii	Japan	1:08.07	6	1:07.72	1	2:15.79	
2nd place, silver medalist(s)	82	Takeshi Suzuki	Japan	1:05.71	2	1:10.19	4	2:15.90	+0.11
3rd place, bronze medalist(s)	71	Christoph Kunz	Switzerland	1:06.08	3	1:10.03	3	2:16.11	+0.32
4	80	Christopher Devlin-Young	United States	1:04.01	1	1:12.32	10	2:16.33	+0.54
5	68	Cyril More	France	1:06.41	4	1:10.70	6	2:17.11	+1.32
6	85	Georg Kreiter	Germany	1:09.23	10	1:08.94	2	2:18.17	+2.38
7	75	Josh Dueck	Canada	1:08.44	7	1:10.41	5	2:18.85	+3.06
8	70	Sang Min Han	South Korea	1:07.36	5	1:11.67	7	2:19.03	+3.24
9	84	Thomas Nolte	Germany	1:09.13	9	1:11.99	9	2:21.12	+5.33
10	76	Robert Froehle	Austria	1:08.78	8	1:13.25	12	2:22.03	+6.24
11	86	Kees-Jan van der Klooster	Netherlands	1:11.08	19	1:11.94	8	2:23.02	+7.23
12	72	Dietmar Dorn	Austria	1:10.32	16	1:13.10	11	2:23.42	+7.63
13	93	Roman Rabl	Austria	1:09.47	12	1:14.04	16	2:23.51	+7.72
14	87	Scott Meyer	United States	1:10.68	17	1:13.26	13	2:23.94	+8.15
15	78	Yohann Taberlet	France	1:10.98	18	1:13.95	15	2:24.93	+9.14
16	77	Tyler Walker	United States	1:09.68	13	1:15.92	20	2:25.60	+9.81
17	94	Miroslav Sperk	Czech Republic	1:11.21	20	1:15.46	19	2:26.67	+10.88
18	73	Sean Rose	United Kingdom	1:11.67	21	1:15.30	18	2:26.97	+11.18
19	83	Akira Taniguchi	Japan	1:13.77	23	1:14.87	17	2:28.64	+12.85
20	88	Frederic Francois	France	1:15.00	28	1:13.77	14	2:28.77	+12.98
21	100	Oldrich Jelinek	Czech Republic	1:11.99	22	1:16.99	21	2:28.98	+13.19
22	90	Jong Seork Park	South Korea	1:13.97	24	1:17.66	22	2:31.63	+15.84
23	96	Michael Brennan	United Kingdom	1:14.86	26	1:18.38	23	2:33.24	+17.45
24	89	Jasmin Bambur	Serbia	1:14.02	25	1:21.21	24	2:35.23	+19.44
25	81	Jean Yves Le Meur	France	1:09.33	11	1:27.09	28	2:36.42	+20.63
26	98	Oscar Espallargas	Spain	1:21.25	29	1:24.11	26	2:45.36	+29.57
27	101	Peter Dunning	United Kingdom	1:24.32	31	1:23.69	25	2:48.01	+32.22
28	99	Simon Jacobsen	Sweden	1:25.14	32	1:26.61	27	2:51.75	+35.96
29	102	Dino Sokolovic	Croatia	1:23.97	30	1:28.52	29	2:52.49	+36.70
	69	Philipp Bonadimann	Austria	DSQ					
	95	Gal Jakic	Slovenia	DNF					
	91	Andreas Kapfinger	Austria	DNF					
	97	Enrico Giorge	Italy			DNF			
	92	Franz Hanfstingl	Germany			DNF			
	74	Akira Kano	Japan			DNF			

== See also ==
- 2011 IPC Alpine Skiing World Championships - Team event
