= 2011 IPC Alpine Skiing World Championships – Super combined =

Super combined at the 2011 IPC Alpine Skiing World Championships
- Alpine skiing
- Venue: Kandahar Banchetta Giovanni N.
- Location: Sestriere
- Date: January 19

The Super combined competitions of the 2011 IPC Alpine Skiing World Championships were held at Kandahar Banchetta Giovanni N., in Sestriere, Italy on January 19.

== Women ==
=== Visually impaired ===
In the super combined visually impaired, the athlete with a visual impairment has a sighted guide. The two skiers are considered a team, and dual medals are awarded.

| Rank | Bib | Name | Country | Super G | Rank | Slalom | Rank | Total | Difference |
|---|---|---|---|---|---|---|---|---|---|
| 1st place, gold medalist(s) | 1 | Henrieta Farkasova; Guide: Natalia Subrtova | Slovakia | 1:30.31 | 1 | 55.52 | 1 | 2:25.83 | |
| 2nd place, silver medalist(s) | 3 | Alexandra Frantseva; Guide: Evgenia Kolosovskaya | Russia | 1:34.56 | 2 | 57.75 | 3 | 2:32.31 | +6.48 |
| 3rd place, bronze medalist(s) | 2 | Melissa Perrine; Guide: Andrew Bor | Australia | 1:35.36 | 3 | 57.48 | 2 | 2:32.84 | +7.01 |
| 4 | 5 | Danelle Umstead; Guide: Robert Umstead | United States | 1:41.38 | 4 | 1:00.81 | 4 | 2:42.19 | +16.36 |
| 5 | 4 | Natasha de Troyer; Guide: Werner de Troyer | Belgium | 1:47.52 | 5 | 1:01.52 | 5 | 2:49.04 | +23.21 |
| 6 | 6 | Anna Kuliskova; Guide: Michaela Hubacova | Czech Republic | 1:54.69 | 6 | 1:12.12 | 6 | 3:06.81 | +40.98 |

=== Standing ===
| Rank | Bib | Name | Country | Super G | Rank | Slalom | Rank | Total | Difference |
|---|---|---|---|---|---|---|---|---|---|
| 1st place, gold medalist(s) | 12 | Solène Jambaqué | France | 1:25.62 | 1 | 56.32 | 4 | 2:21.94 | |
| 2nd place, silver medalist(s) | 7 | Andrea Rothfuss | Germany | 1:28.13 | 2 | 54.15 | 1 | 2:22.28 | +0.34 |
| 3rd place, bronze medalist(s) | 13 | Karolina Wisniewska | Canada | 1:30.20 | 4 | 55.59 | 3 | 2:25.79 | +3.85 |
| 4 | 9 | Petra Smarzova | Slovakia | 1:32.76 | 6 | 55.26 | 2 | 2:28.02 | +6.08 |
| 5 | 14 | Katja Saarinen | Finland | 1:45.84 | 7 | 59.71 | 5 | 2:45.55 | +23.61 |
| | 8 | Marie Bochet | France | DNF | | | | | |
| | 11 | Danja Haslacher | Austria | | | DNF | | | |
| | 10 | Melania Corradini | Italy | | | DNF | | | |

=== Sitting ===
| Rank | Bib | Name | Country | Super G | Rank | Slalom | Rank | Total | Difference |
|---|---|---|---|---|---|---|---|---|---|
| 1st place, gold medalist(s) | 17 | Anna Schaffelhuber | Germany | 1:35.27 | 3 | 56.35 | 1 | 2:31.62 | |
| 2nd place, silver medalist(s) | 15 | Claudia Loesch | Austria | 1:32.47 | 1 | 1:00.64 | 2 | 2:33.11 | +1.49 |
| 3rd place, bronze medalist(s) | 18 | Laurie Stephens | United States | 1:33.89 | 2 | 1:08.79 | 3 | 2:42.68 | +11.06 |
| | 16 | Alana Nichols | United States | DNF | | | | | |

== Men ==
=== Visually impaired ===
In the super combined visually impaired, the athlete with a visual impairment has a sighted guide. The two skiers are considered a team, and dual medals are awarded.

| Rank | Bib | Name | Country | Super G | Rank | Slalom | Rank | Total | Difference |
|---|---|---|---|---|---|---|---|---|---|
| 1st place, gold medalist(s) | 28 | Yon Santacana Maiztegui; Guide: Miguel Galindo Garces | Spain | 1:20.97 | 3 | 46.46 | 2 | 2:07.43 | |
| 2nd place, silver medalist(s) | 24 | Jakub Krako; Guide: Dusan Simo | Slovakia | 1:21.95 | 4 | 46.41 | 1 | 2:08.36 | +0.93 |
| 3rd place, bronze medalist(s) | 25 | Chris Williamson; Guide: Robin Femy | Canada | 1:19.95 | 1 | 49.34 | 5 | 2:09.29 | +1.86 |
| 4 | 19 | Miroslav Haraus; Guide: Martin Makovnik | Slovakia | 1:20.81 | 2 | 48.75 | 3 | 2:09.56 | +2.13 |
| 5 | 21 | Radomir Dudas; Guide: Maros Hudik | Slovakia | 1:25.25 | 5 | 50.39 | 6 | 2:15.64 | +8.21 |
| 6 | 22 | Ivan Frantsev; Guide: Evgeny Pinaev | Russia | 1:25.53 | 6 | 50.47 | 7 | 2:16.00 | +8.57 |
| 7 | 23 | Gabriel Juan Gorce Yepes; Guide: Josep Arnau Ferrer Ventura | Spain | 1:27.92 | 8 | 50.79 | 8 | 2:18.71 | +11.28 |
| 8 | 29 | Valery Redkozubov; Guide: Viacheslav Molodtsov | Russia | 1:37.68 | 10 | 49.30 | 4 | 2:26.98 | +19.55 |
| 9 | 26 | Michal Beladic; Guide: Martin Pavlak | Slovakia | 1:26.27 | 7 | 1:01.65 | 9 | 2:27.92 | +20.49 |
| | 30 | Christoph Prettner; Guide: Stefan Schoner | Austria | DNF | | | | | |
| | 27 | Norbert Holik; Guide: Lubos Bosela | Slovakia | DNF | | | | | |
| | 20 | Nicolas Berejny; Guide: Gregory Nouhaud | France | DNF | | | | | |
| | 31 | Daniel Cintula; Guide: Mario Babinsky | Slovakia | | | DNS | | | |

=== Standing ===
| Rank | Bib | Name | Country | Super G | Rank | Slalom | Rank | Total | Difference |
|---|---|---|---|---|---|---|---|---|---|
| 1st place, gold medalist(s) | 33 | Vincent Gauthier-Manuel | France | 1:19.76 | 1 | 45.55 | 1 | 2:05.31 | |
| 2nd place, silver medalist(s) | 35 | Gerd Schönfelder | Germany | 1:20.24 | 2 | 46.82 | 4 | 2:07.06 | +1.75 |
| 3rd place, bronze medalist(s) | 44 | Thomas Pfyl | Switzerland | 1:22.25 | 4 | 46.63 | 2 | 2:08.88 | +3.57 |
| 4 | 46 | Toby Kane | Australia | 1:21.51 | 3 | 47.56 | 5 | 2:09.07 | +3.76 |
| 5 | 32 | Alexandr Alyabyev | Russia | 1:23.70 | 8 | 46.69 | 3 | 2:10.39 | +5.08 |
| 6 | 34 | Michael Bruegger | Switzerland | 1:23.24 | 7 | 47.82 | 7 | 2:11.06 | +5.75 |
| 7 | 47 | Mitchell Gourley | Australia | 1:24.56 | 10 | 47.62 | 6 | 2:12.18 | +6.87 |
| 8 | 42 | Adam Hall | New Zealand | 1:23.98 | 9 | 50.00 | 9 | 2:13.98 | +8.67 |
| 9 | 38 | Markus Salcher | Austria | 1:22.45 | 5 | 53.15 | 14 | 2:15.60 | +10.29 |
| 10 | 40 | Matt Hallat | Canada | 1:28.12 | 11 | 48.67 | 8 | 2:16.79 | +11.48 |
| 11 | 37 | Stanislav Loska | Czech Republic | 1:28.53 | 12 | 50.96 | 10 | 2:19.49 | +14.18 |
| 12 | 41 | Ralph Green | United States | 1:29.30 | 14 | 52.77 | 11 | 2:22.07 | +16.76 |
| 13 | 52 | Kirk Schornstein | Canada | 1:29.24 | 13 | 53.00 | 13 | 2:22.24 | +16.93 |
| 14 | 49 | Jacob Guilera Casas | Spain | 1:31.88 | 17 | 52.80 | 12 | 2:24.68 | +19.37 |
| 15 | 39 | Martin France | Slovakia | 1:35.16 | 18 | 54.78 | 15 | 2:29.94 | +24.63 |
| | 51 | Bernhard Habersatter | Austria | DNS | | | | | |
| | 48 | Andreas Preiss | Austria | DNS | | | | | |
| | 45 | Cameron Rahles-Rahbula | Australia | DNS | | | | | |
| | 43 | Lionel Brun | France | | | DNS | | | |
| | 50 | Bart Verbruggen | Netherlands | | | DNF | | | |
| | 36 | Hiraku Misawa | Japan | | | DNF | | | |

=== Sitting ===
| Rank | Bib | Name | Country | Super G | Rank | Slalom | Rank | Total | Difference |
|---|---|---|---|---|---|---|---|---|---|
| 1st place, gold medalist(s) | 58 | Takeshi Suzuki | Japan | 1:20.94 | 3 | 46.85 | 1 | 2:07.79 | |
| 2nd place, silver medalist(s) | 55 | Cyril More | France | 1:19.89 | 1 | 49.04 | 5 | 2:08.93 | +1.14 |
| 3rd place, bronze medalist(s) | 60 | Yohann Taberlet | France | 1:21.55 | 5 | 48.43 | 3 | 2:09.98 | +2.19 |
| 4 | 54 | Philipp Bonadimann | Austria | 1:23.52 | 12 | 48.08 | 2 | 2:11.60 | +3.81 |
| 5 | 65 | Frederic Francois | France | 1:21.01 | 4 | 51.06 | 7 | 2:12.07 | +4.28 |
| 6 | 56 | Jean Yves Le Meur | France | 1:23.41 | 10 | 48.87 | 4 | 2:12.28 | +4.49 |
| 7 | 59 | Franz Hanfstingl | Germany | 1:23.51 | 11 | 49.73 | 6 | 2:13.24 | +5.45 |
| 8 | 62 | Sang Min Han | South Korea | 1:22.46 | 9 | 51.81 | 8 | 2:14.27 | +6.48 |
| 9 | 70 | Sean Rose | United Kingdom | 1:21.62 | 6 | 53.43 | 10 | 2:15.05 | +7.26 |
| 10 | 64 | Josh Dueck | Canada | 1:20.11 | 2 | 55.55 | 12 | 2:15.66 | +7.87 |
| 11 | 57 | Akira Kano | Japan | 1:25.36 | 13 | 53.42 | 9 | 2:18.78 | +10.99 |
| 12 | 66 | Akira Taniguchi | Japan | 1:27.37 | 15 | 54.45 | 11 | 2:21.82 | +14.03 |
| 13 | 75 | Jong Seork Park | South Korea | 1:29.84 | 17 | 56.56 | 13 | 2:26.40 | +18.61 |
| | 68 | Thomas Nolte | Germany | DSQ | | | | | |
| | 53 | Taiki Morii | Japan | DSQ | | | | | |
| | 73 | Christoph Kunz | Switzerland | DNF | | | | | |
| | 72 | Kees-Jan van der Klooster | Netherlands | DNF | | | | | |
| | 74 | Oldrich Jelinek | Czech Republic | | | DSQ | | | |
| | 71 | Jasmin Bambur | Serbia | | | DSQ | | | |
| | 69 | Scott Meyer | United States | | | DNF | | | |
| | 67 | Tyler Walker | United States | | | DNF | | | |
| | 63 | Dietmar Dorn | Austria | | | DNF | | | |
| | 61 | Christopher Devlin-Young | United States | | | DNF | | | |
