= 2011 IPC Alpine Skiing World Championships – Super-G =

Super-G at the 2011 IPC Alpine Skiing World Championships
- Alpine skiing
- Venue: Kandahar Banchetta Giovanni N.
- Location: Sestriere
- Date: January 18

The Super-G competitions of the 2011 IPC Alpine Skiing World Championships was held at Kandahar Banchetta Giovanni N., in Sestriere, Italy on January 18.

== Women ==
=== Visually impaired ===
In the Super-G visually impaired, the athlete with a visual impairment has a sighted guide. The two skiers are considered a team, and dual medals are awarded.

Rank	Bib	Name	Country	Time	Difference
1st place, gold medalist(s)	1	Anna Kuliskova; Guide: Michaela Hubacova	Czech Republic	1:34.28	
2nd place, silver medalist(s)	2	Alexandra Frantseva; Guide: Evgenia Kolosovskaya	Russia	1:35.49	+1.21
3rd place, bronze medalist(s)	5	Melissa Perrine; Guide: Andrew Bor	Australia	1:38.08	+3.80
4	4	Danelle Umstead; Guide: Robert Umstead	United States	1:38.57	+4.29
5	6	Natasha de Troyer; Guide: Werner de Troyer	Belgium	1:42.80	+8.52
	3	Henrieta Farkasova; Guide: Natalia Subrtova	Slovakia	DNF	

=== Standing ===
Rank	Bib	Name	Country	Time	Difference
1st place, gold medalist(s)	8	Solène Jambaqué	France	1:25.08	
2nd place, silver medalist(s)	13	Marie Bochet	France	1:25.48	+0.40
3rd place, bronze medalist(s)	10	Andrea Rothfuss	Germany	1:26.48	+1.40
4	7	Melania Corradini	Italy	1:28.09	+3.01
5	9	Danja Haslacher	Austria	1:29.61	+4.53
6	14	Karolina Wisniewska	Canada	1:31.13	+6.05
7	11	Petra Smarzova	Slovakia	1:32.47	+7.39
8	12	Katja Saarinen	Finland	1:44.09	+19.01

=== Sitting ===
Rank	Bib	Name	Country	Time	Difference
1st place, gold medalist(s)	17	Alana Nichols	United States	1:27.56	
2nd place, silver medalist(s)	18	Laurie Stephens	United States	1:28.66	+1.10
3rd place, bronze medalist(s)	16	Claudia Loesch	Austria	1:29.04	+1.48
4	15	Anna Schaffelhuber	Germany	1:33.56	+6.00

== Men ==
=== Visually impaired ===
In the Super-G visually impaired, the athlete with a visual impairment has a sighted guide. The two skiers are considered a team, and dual medals are awarded.

Rank	Bib	Name	Country	Time	Difference
1st place, gold medalist(s)	24	Yon Santacana Maiztegui; Guide: Miguel Galindo Garces	Spain	1:19.20	
2nd place, silver medalist(s)	29	Chris Williamson; Guide: Robin Femy	Canada	1:19.50	+0.30
3rd place, bronze medalist(s)	26	Nicolas Berejny; Guide: Gregory Nouhaud	France	1:20.47	+1.27
4	27	Jakub Krako; Guide: Dusan Simo	Slovakia	1:21.94	+2.74
5	30	Miroslav Haraus; Guide: Martin Makovnik	Slovakia	1:22.45	+3.25
6	20	Christoph Prettner; Guide: Stefan Schoner	Austria	1:25.81	+6.61
7	22	Ivan Frantsev; Guide: Evgeny Pinaev	Russia	1:26.22	+7.02
8	19	Gabriel Juan Gorce Yepes; Guide: Josep Arnau Ferrer Ventura	Spain	1:28.00	+8.80
T9	28	Norbert Holik; Guide: Lubos Bosela	Slovakia	1:28.23	+9.03
T9	23	Michal Beladic; Guide: Martin Pavlak	Slovakia	1:28.95	+9.75
11	25	Daniel Cintula; Guide: Mario Babinsky	Slovakia	1:29.07	+9.87
	21	Radomir Dudas; Guide: Maros Hudik	Slovakia	DNS	

=== Standing ===
Rank	Bib	Name	Country	Time	Difference
1st place, gold medalist(s)	41	Gerd Schönfelder	Germany	1:19.22	
2nd place, silver medalist(s)	37	Vincent Gauthier-Manuel	France	1:19.26	+0.04
3rd place, bronze medalist(s)	40	Thomas Pfyl	Switzerland	1:19.95	+0.73
4	32	Toby Kane	Australia	1:21.87	+2.65
5	33	Michael Bruegger	Switzerland	1:22.39	+3.17
6	31	Lionel Brun	France	1:22.45	+3.23
7	34	Mitchell Gourley	Australia	1:22.89	+3.67
8	36	Alexandr Alyabyev	Russia	1:23.61	+4.39
9	43	Markus Salcher	Austria	1:23.73	+4.51
10	44	Adam Hall	New Zealand	1:25.98	+6.76
11	46	Christian Lanthaler	Italy	1:26.93	+7.71
12	48	Stanislav Loska	Czech Republic	1:27.40	+8.18
13	51	Kirk Schornstein	Canada	1:27.94	+8.72
14	42	Bart Verbruggen	Netherlands	1:27.98	+8.76
15	39	Bernhard Habersatter	Austria	1:28.29	+9.07
16	38	Martin France	Slovakia	1:28.93	+9.71
17	49	Ralph Green	United States	1:29.96	+10.74
18	52	Jacob Guilera Casas	Spain	1:30.39	+11.17
	50	Matt Hallat	Canada	DNF	
	47	Andreas Preiss	Austria	DNF	
	45	Cameron Rahles-Rahbula	Australia	DNF	
	35	Hiraku Misawa	Japan	DNF	

=== Sitting ===
Rank	Bib	Name	Country	Time	Difference
1st place, gold medalist(s)	64	Christopher Devlin-Young	United States	1:17.67	
2nd place, silver medalist(s)	62	Taiki Morii	Japan	1:18.29	+0.62
3rd place, bronze medalist(s)	68	Cyril More	France	1:19.50	+1.83
4	63	Philipp Bonadimann	Austria	1:20.35	+2.68
5	56	Yohann Taberlet	France	1:21.20	+3.53
6	71	Kees-Jan van der Klooster	Netherlands	1:21.24	+3.57
7	54	Christoph Kunz	Switzerland	1:22.10	+4.43
8	61	Josh Dueck	Canada	1:22.27	+4.60
9	65	Robert Froehle	Austria	1:22.42	+4.75
10	75	Sang Min Han	South Korea	1:22.45	+4.78
11	57	Jean Yves Le Meur	France	1:22.76	+5.09
12	70	Thomas Nolte	Germany	1:22.93	+5.26
13	53	Takeshi Suzuki	Japan	1:23.43	+5.76
14	76	Franz Hanfstingl	Germany	1:23.78	+6.11
15	55	Frederic Francois	France	1:24.77	+7.10
16	67	Tyler Walker	United States	1:25.02	+7.35
17	74	Akira Taniguchi	Japan	1:26.30	+8.63
18	73	Jong Seork Park	South Korea	1:26.36	+8.69
19	58	Dietmar Dorn	Austria	1:27.46	+9.79
20	72	Talan Skeels-Piggins	United Kingdom	1:29.14	+11.47
21	78	Oldrich Jelinek	Czech Republic	1:30.52	+12.85
	77	Scott Meyer	United States	DNF	
	69	Jasmin Bambur	Serbia	DNF	
	66	Sean Rose	United Kingdom	DNF	
	59	Akira Kano	Japan	DNF	
	60	Reinhold Sampl	Austria	DNS	
