= 2011 IPC Alpine Skiing World Championships – Downhill =

Alpine skiing competition

Downhill at the 2011 IPC Alpine Skiing World Championships
- Alpine skiing
- Venue: Kandahar Banchetta Giovanni N.
- Location: Sestriere
- Date: January 16

The Downhill competitions of the 2011 IPC Alpine Skiing World Championships was held at Kandahar Banchetta Giovanni N., in Sestriere, Italy on January 16.

== Women ==
=== Visually impaired ===
In the downhill visually impaired, the athlete with a visual impairment has a sighted guide. The two skiers are considered a team, and dual medals are awarded.

| Rank | Bib | Name | Country | Time | Difference |
|---|---|---|---|---|---|
| 1st place, gold medalist(s) | 2 | Henrieta Farkasova; Guide: Natalia Subrtova | Slovakia | 1:28.36 | |
| 2nd place, silver medalist(s) | 1 | Melissa Perrine; Guide: Andrew Bor | Australia | 1:40.50 | +12.14 |
| 3rd place, bronze medalist(s) | 5 | Alexandra Frantseva; Guide: Evgenia Kolosovskaya | Russia | 1:41.87 | +13.51 |
| | 3 | Anna Kuliskova; Guide: Michaela Hubacova | Czech Republic | DNF | |
| | 4 | Danelle Umstead; Guide: Robert Umstead | United States | DSQ | |

=== Standing ===
| Rank | Bib | Name | Country | Time | Difference |
|---|---|---|---|---|---|
| 1st place, gold medalist(s) | 10 | Andrea Rothfuss | Germany | 1:29.62 | |
| 2nd place, silver medalist(s) | 7 | Marie Bochet | France | 1:29.86 | +0.24 |
| 3rd place, bronze medalist(s) | 8 | Solène Jambaqué | France | 1:30.09 | +0.47 |
| 4 | 11 | Melania Corradini | Italy | 1:30.94 | +1.32 |
| 5 | 9 | Karolina Wisniewska | Canada | 1:35.56 | +5.94 |
| 6 | 6 | Danja Haslacher | Austria | 1:36.26 | +6.64 |
| 7 | 12 | Petra Smarzova | Slovakia | 1:37.52 | +7.90 |

=== Sitting ===
| Rank | Bib | Name | Country | Time | Difference |
|---|---|---|---|---|---|
| 1st place, gold medalist(s) | 14 | Alana Nichols | United States | 1:30.45 | |
| 2nd place, silver medalist(s) | 13 | Laurie Stephens | United States | 1:33.05 | +2.60 |
| 3rd place, bronze medalist(s) | 15 | Claudia Loesch | Austria | 1:35.35 | +4.90 |
| 4 | 16 | Anna Schaffelhuber | Germany | 1:37.59 | +7.14 |

== Men ==
=== Visually impaired ===
In the downhill visually impaired, the athlete with a visual impairment has a sighted guide. The two skiers are considered a team, and dual medals are awarded.

| Rank | Bib | Name | Country | Time | Difference |
|---|---|---|---|---|---|
| 1st place, gold medalist(s) | 20 | Nicolas Berejny; Guide: Gregory Nouhaud | France | 1:21.40 | |
| 2nd place, silver medalist(s) | 21 | Yon Santacana Maiztegui; Guide: Miguel Galindo Garces | Spain | 1:21.59 | +0.19 |
| 3rd place, bronze medalist(s) | 25 | Chris Williamson; Guide: Robin Femy | Canada | 1:22.76 | +1.36 |
| 4 | 19 | Miroslav Haraus; Guide: Martin Makovnik | Slovakia | 1:22.84 | +1.44 |
| 5 | 26 | Jakub Krako; Guide: Dusan Simo | Slovakia | 1:25.11 | +3.71 |
| 6 | 22 | Radomir Dudas; Guide: Maros Hudik | Slovakia | 1:26.35 | +4.95 |
| 7 | 18 | Christoph Prettner; Guide: Stefan Schoner | Austria | 1:28.42 | +7.02 |
| 8 | 27 | Ivan Frantsev; Guide: Evgeny Pinaev | Russia | 1:29.79 | +8.39 |
| T9 | 24 | Michal Beladic; Guide: Martin Pavlak | Slovakia | 1:30.24 | +8.84 |
| T9 | 17 | Norbert Holik; Guide: Lubos Bosela | Slovakia | 1:30.24 | +8.84 |
| 11 | | Gabriel Juan Gorce Yepes; Guide: Josep Arnau Ferrer Ventura | Spain | 1:30.84 | +9.44 |

=== Standing ===
| Rank | Bib | Name | Country | Time | Difference |
|---|---|---|---|---|---|
| 1st place, gold medalist(s) | 36 | Gerd Schönfelder | Germany | 1:21.84 | |
| 2nd place, silver medalist(s) | 39 | Vincent Gauthier-Manuel | France | 1:22.08 | +0.24 |
| 3rd place, bronze medalist(s) | 34 | Thomas Pfyl | Switzerland | 1:22.96 | +1.12 |
| 4 | 28 | Toby Kane | Australia | 1:24.13 | +2.29 |
| 5 | 45 | Markus Salcher | Austria | 1:24.48 | +2.64 |
| 6 | 30 | Mitchell Gourley | Australia | 1:25.83 | +3.99 |
| 7 | 29 | Michael Bruegger | Switzerland | 1:25.84 | +4.00 |
| 8 | 33 | Andreas Preiss | Austria | 1:27.20 | +5.36 |
| 9 | 38 | Bernhard Habersatter | Austria | 1:27.28 | +5.44 |
| 10 | 44 | Alexandr Alyabyev | Russia | 1:27.60 | +5.76 |
| 11 | 35 | Christian Lanthaler | Italy | 1:28.21 | +6.37 |
| 12 | 42 | Kirk Schornstein | Canada | 1:29.18 | +7.34 |
| 13 | 37 | Hiraku Misawa | Japan | 1:31.37 | +9.53 |
| 14 | 31 | Ralph Green | United States | 1:34.75 | +12.91 |
| 15 | 43 | Martin France | Slovakia | 1:37.02 | +15.18 |
| | 41 | Matt Hallat | Canada | DNF | |
| | 40 | Bart Verbruggen | Netherlands | DNF | |
| | 32 | Cameron Rahles-Rahbula | Australia | DNF | |

=== Sitting ===
Great Britain's Talan Skeels-Piggins did not compete in the Downhill race, as he had a crash in a training run the day before.

| Rank | Bib | Name | Country | Time | Difference |
|---|---|---|---|---|---|
| 1st place, gold medalist(s) | 55 | Akira Kano | Japan | 1:20.94 | |
| 2nd place, silver medalist(s) | 60 | Taiki Morii | Japan | 1:21.39 | +0.45 |
| 3rd place, bronze medalist(s) | 48 | Kees-Jan van der Klooster | Netherlands | 1:21.63 | +0.69 |
| 4 | 56 | Takeshi Suzuki | Japan | 1:22.04 | +1.10 |
| 5 | 49 | Josh Dueck | Canada | 1:22.41 | +1.47 |
| 6 | 50 | Sean Rose | United Kingdom | 1:23.00 | +2.06 |
| 7 | 47 | Thomas Nolte | Germany | 1:23.95 | +3.01 |
| 8 | 62 | Philipp Bonadimann | Austria | 1:24.09 | +3.15 |
| 9 | 63 | Franz Hanfstingl | Germany | 1:24.81 | +3.87 |
| 10 | 61 | Sang Min Han | South Korea | 1:25.04 | +4.10 |
| 11 | 65 | Cyril More | France | 1:25.05 | +4.11 |
| 12 | 54 | Frederic Francois | France | 1:25.51 | +4.57 |
| 13 | 64 | Robert Froehle | Austria | 1:30.12 | +9.18 |
| 14 | 46 | Christopher Devlin-Young | United States | 1:31.15 | +10.21 |
| 15 | 66 | Akira Taniguchi | Japan | 1:36.20 | +15.26 |
| | 51 | Jasmin Bambur | Serbia | DNF | |
| | 52 | Jong Seork Park | South Korea | DNF | |
| | 59 | Christoph Kunz | Switzerland | DNF | |
| | 58 | Reinhold Sampl | Austria | DNF | |
| | 57 | Yohann Taberlet | France | DNF | |
| | 53 | Tyler Walker | United States | DNS | |
