= Anna Schaffelhuber =

German para-alpine skier

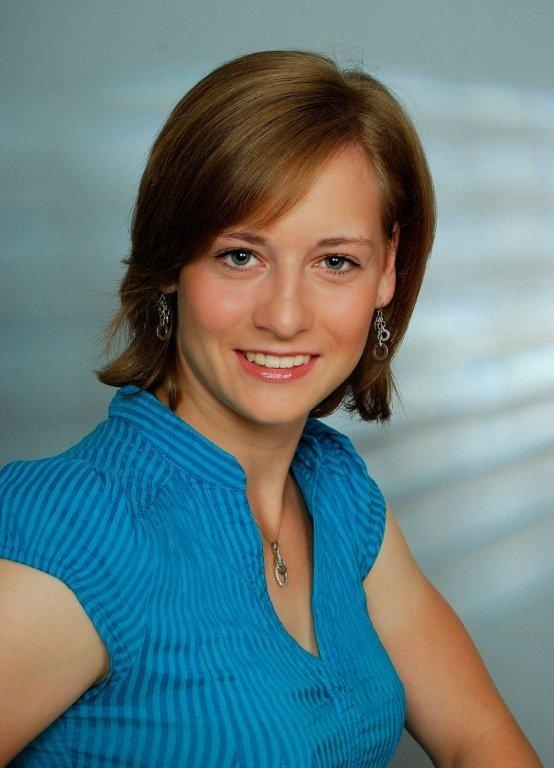

Personal information
- Full name: Anna Katharina Schaffelhuber
- Nationality: German
- Born: 26 January 1993 (age 33) Regensburg, Germany
- Height: 1.50 m (4 ft 11 in)

Sport
- Sport: Para-alpine skiing
- Club: TSV Bayerbach
Medal record
Event	1st	2nd	3rd
Paralympic Games	7	1	1
World Championships	9	7	3
Total	16	8	4
Women's Alpine skiing
Representing Germany
Winter Paralympic Games
Gold medal – first place	2014 Sochi	Downhill
Gold medal – first place	2014 Sochi	Super-G
Gold medal – first place	2014 Sochi	Slalom
Gold medal – first place	2014 Sochi	Combined
Gold medal – first place	2014 Sochi	Giant slalom
Gold medal – first place	2018 Pyeongchang	Downhill
Gold medal – first place	2018 Pyeongchang	Super-G
Silver medal – second place	2018 Pyeongchang	Super combined
Bronze medal – third place	2010 Vancouver	Super-G
IPC Alpine Skiing World Championships
Gold medal – first place	2011 Sestriere	Super combined
Gold medal – first place	2011 Sestriere	Slalom
Gold medal – first place	2011 Sestriere	Giant slalom
Gold medal – first place	2013 La Molina	Slalom
Gold medal – first place	2015 Panorama	Super-G
Gold medal – first place	2015 Panorama	Giant slalom
Gold medal – first place	2017 Tarvisio	Downhill
Gold medal – first place	2017 Tarvisio	Slalom
Gold medal – first place	2017 Tarvisio	Super combined
Silver medal – second place	2011 Sestriere	Team event
Silver medal – second place	2013 La Molina	Giant slalom
Silver medal – second place	2013 La Molina	Super-G
Silver medal – second place	2015 Panorama	Slalom
Silver medal – second place	2015 Panorama	Super combined
Silver medal – second place	2017 Tarvisio	Giant slalom
Silver medal – second place	2017 Tarvisio	Super-G
Bronze medal – third place	2013 La Molina	Downhill
Bronze medal – third place	2013 La Molina	Super combined
Bronze medal – third place	2015 Panorama	Downhill

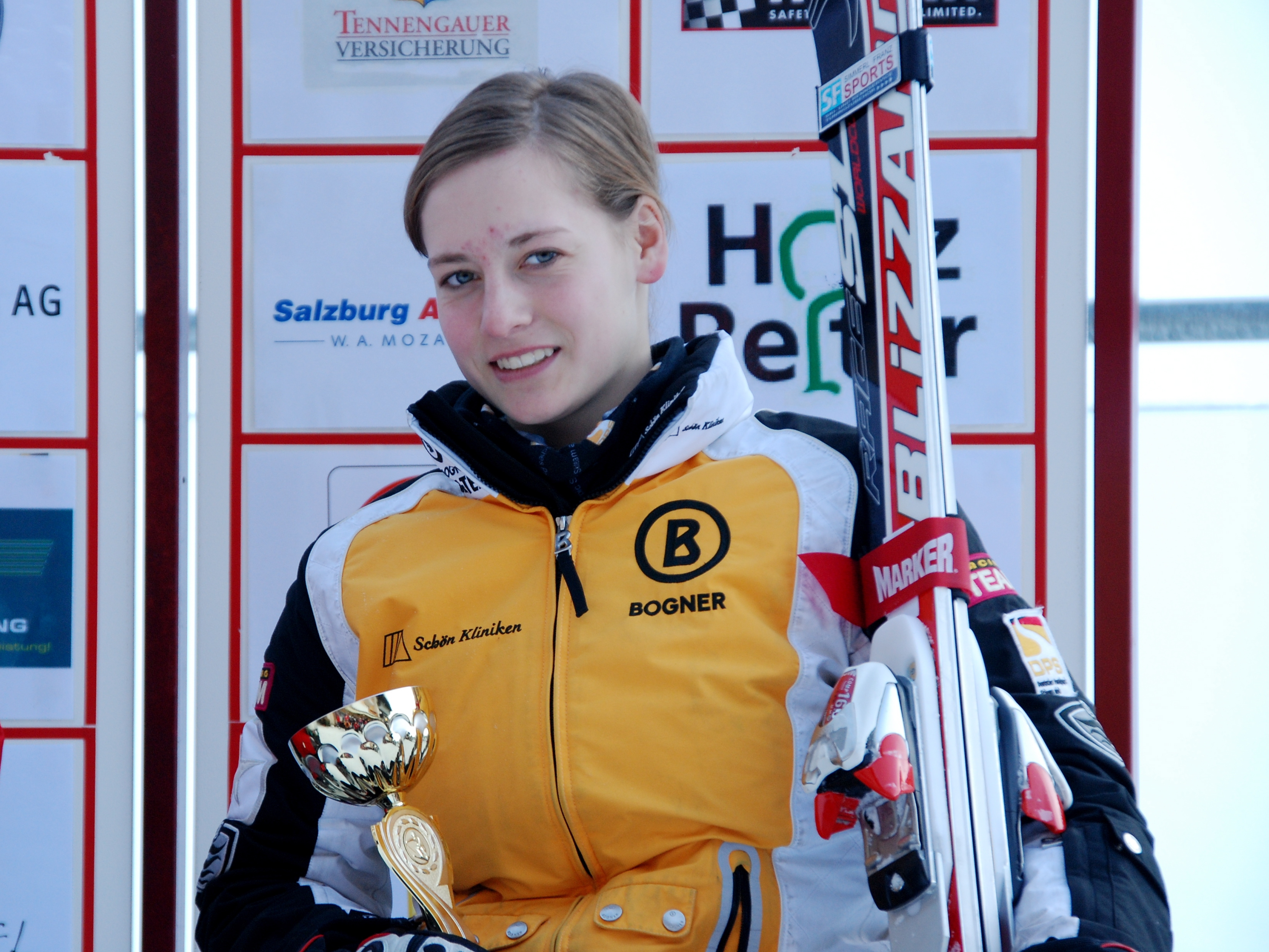
Schaffelhuber on the podium at an event in Austria

Anna Katharina Schaffelhuber (born 26 January 1993) is a German para-alpine skier. At the 2014 Winter Paralympics she won five gold medals, becoming only the second athlete to sweep the alpine skiing events.

== Early life ==
Schaffelhuber was born in Regensburg, Bavaria, Germany. She was born with an incomplete spinal cord and as a result has paraplegia and uses a wheelchair. She began monoskiing at age five and at age fourteen received a scholarship to join a national junior skiing programme.

== Career ==
Schaffelhuber competes in the LW10 para-alpine skiing classification using a sitting mono-ski and outriggers.

She was selected for the German team at the 2010 Winter Paralympics held in Vancouver, British Columbia, Canada where she competed in four events. She won the bronze medal in the super-G finishing behind Claudia Lösch of Austria and American Alana Nichols in a time of 1 minute 38.25 seconds. She also finished fourth in two events, the super combined and the slalom, and seventh in the giant slalom. During the closing ceremony of the Games she carried the German flag.

She skied at the 2011 IPC Alpine Skiing World Championships, held in Sestriere, Italy. She won the three gold medals, in the sitting women's super-combined, slalom and giant slalom, a silver in the team event, as well as finishing fourth in both the downhill and super-G.

At the 2013 IPC Alpine Skiing World Championships held in La Molina, Spain, she successfully defended her title in the slalom, winning the gold medal in a time of 2 minutes 26.18 seconds. She won four other medals; silver medals in the giant slalom and super-G; and bronze medals in the super combined and downhill.

She competed in her second Paralympics at the 2014 Winter Games in Sochi, Russia. She claimed her first Paralympic gold medal by winning the sitting downhill in a time of 1 minute 35.55 seconds. She won a second gold medal in the super-G, finishing first in a time of 1 minute 29.11 seconds. Competing in the slalom she was initially disqualified for not having her outriggers in a stationary position at the start of her first run and compatriot Anna-Lena Forster was identified as the gold medal winner in press releases. Following an appeal Schaffelhuber was reinstated and awarded her third gold medal of the Games with Forster winning the silver medal. Schaffelhuber won a fourth gold medal in the combined, with Forster again taking silver as the two German skiers were the only athletes to complete the race. She won her fifth gold medal, completing a clean sweep in the sitting events, by winning the giant slalom in a combined time of 2 minutes 51.26 seconds. She became the second athlete to sweep the alpine skiing events after Lauren Woolstencroft in 2010. For her performance at the Games, Schaffelhuber was awarded Best Female at the Paralympic Sports Awards.

== Awards ==
In November 2010 Schaffelhuber was voted the International Paralympic Committee's athlete of the month, taking 45% of the public vote. In November 2011 she was named Germany's Disabled Athlete of the Year and she was the German National Paralympic Committee's 2013 Female Disabled Athlete of Year.
