= Martin Falch =

Austrian para-alpine skier

Sport
- Country: Austria
- Sport: Para-alpine skiing
Medal record
Paralympic Games
Bronze medal – third place	2002 Salt Lake City	Slalom LW4

Martin Falch is an Austrian para-alpine skier. He represented Austria in four Winter Paralympics: in 2002, 2006, 2010 and 2014.

He won the bronze medal in the men's slalom LW4 event at the 2002 Winter Paralympics.

He also represented Austria in the Slalom event and the Giant slalom event at the 2011 IPC Alpine Skiing World Championships. He did not win a medal in either event.

== See also ==
- List of Paralympic medalists in alpine skiing
