= Andrea Rothfuss =

German para-alpine skier (born 1989)

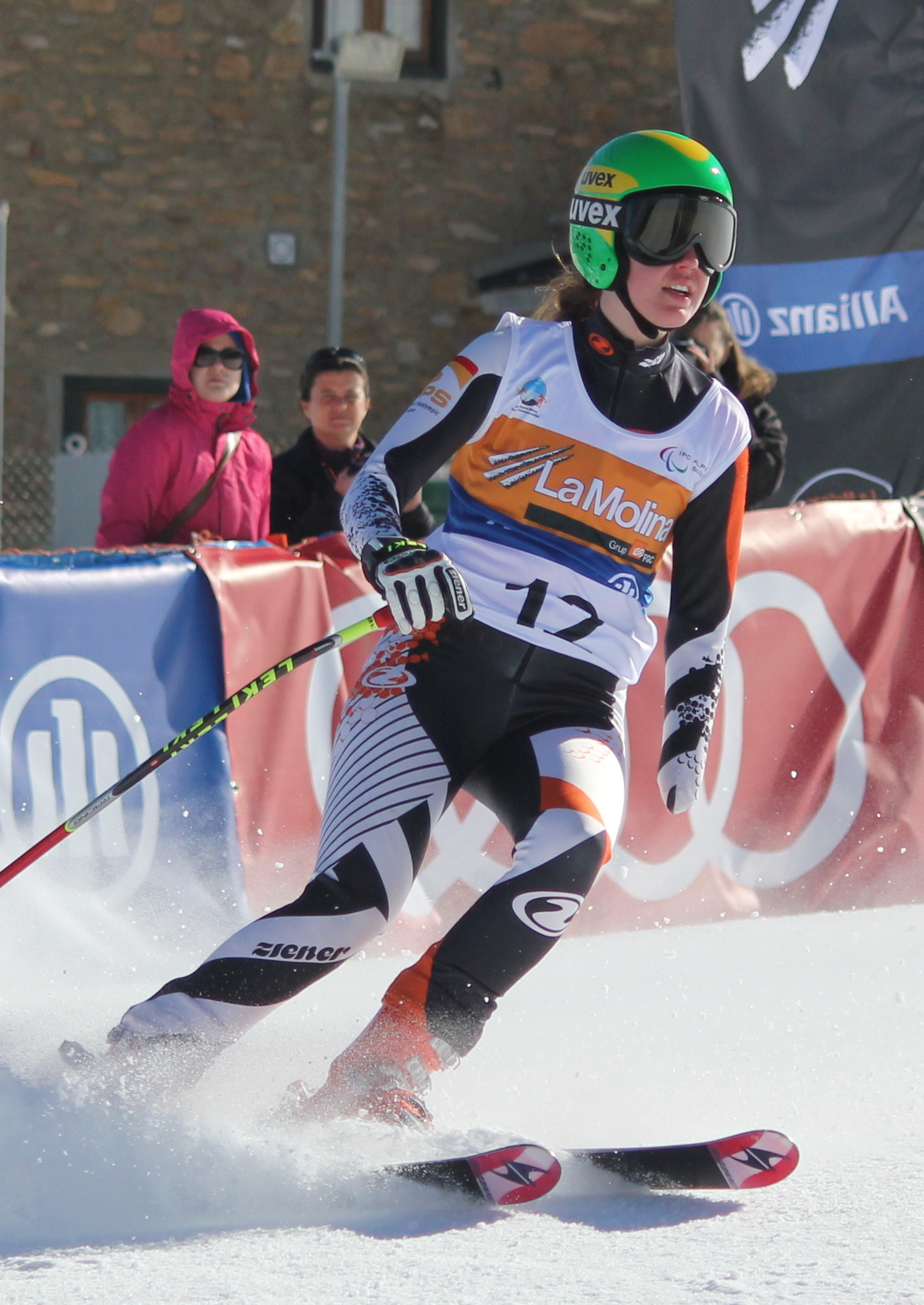
- Rothfuss at the 2013 IPC Alpine Skiing World Champions

Personal information
- Nationality: German
- Born: 20 October 1989 (age 36) Freudenstadt, West Germany
- Years active: 2004–

Sport
- Country: Germany
- Sport: Para-alpine skiing
- Disability class: LW6/8-2
- Event(s): Downhill, slalom, giant slalom, super combined, super-G
- Coached by: Justus Wolf
Medal record
Event	1st	2nd	3rd
Paralympic Games	1	9	4
World Championships	5	16	8
Total	6	25	12
Women's Para-alpine skiing
Representing Germany
Winter Paralympics
Gold medal – first place	2014 Sochi	Slalom, standing
Silver medal – second place	2006 Turin	Giant slalom, standing
Silver medal – second place	2010 Vancouver	Giant slalom, standing
Silver medal – second place	2010 Vancouver	Slalom, standing
Silver medal – second place	2014 Sochi	Combined, standing
Silver medal – second place	2014 Sochi	Giant slalom, standing
Silver medal – second place	2018 Pyeongchang	Downhill, standing
Silver medal – second place	2018 Pyeongchang	Giant slalom, standing
Silver medal – second place	2018 Pyeongchang	Super-G, standing
Silver medal – second place	2018 Pyeongchang	Super combined, standing
Bronze medal – third place	2010 Vancouver	Downhill, standing
Bronze medal – third place	2010 Vancouver	Super-G, standing
Bronze medal – third place	2018 Pyeongchang	Slalom, standing
Bronze medal – third place	2022 Beijing	Giant slalom, standing
World Championships
Gold medal – first place	2009 Pyeongchang	Team event
Gold medal – first place	2011 Sestriere	Downhill, standing
Gold medal – first place	2011 Sestriere	Slalom, standing
Gold medal – first place	2017 Tarvisio	Giant slalom, standing
Gold medal – first place	2017 Tarvisio	Slalom, standing
Silver medal – second place	2011 Sestriere	Super combined, standing
Silver medal – second place	2011 Sestriere	Team event
Silver medal – second place	2013 La Molina	Downhill, standing
Silver medal – second place	2013 La Molina	Giant slalom
Silver medal – second place	2013 La Molina	Slalom, standing
Silver medal – second place	2013 La Molina	Super combined, standing
Silver medal – second place	2015 Panorama	Downhill, standing
Silver medal – second place	2015 Panorama	Giant slalom, standing
Silver medal – second place	2015 Panorama	Super-G, standing
Silver medal – second place	2015 Panorama	Super combined, standing
Silver medal – second place	2017 Tarvisio	Downhill, standing
Silver medal – second place	2017 Tarvisio	Super combined, standing
Silver medal – second place	2019 Sella Nevea	Downhill, standing
Silver medal – second place	2019 Sella Nevea	Super-G, standing
Silver medal – second place	2019 Sella Nevea	Super combined, standing
Silver medal – second place	2023 Lleida	Super-G, standing
Bronze medal – third place	2009 Pyeongchang	Downhill, standing
Bronze medal – third place	2009 Pyeongchang	Giant slalom, standing
Bronze medal – third place	2009 Pyeongchang	Slalom, standing
Bronze medal – third place	2009 Pyeongchang	Super combined, standing
Bronze medal – third place	2011 Sestriere	Super-G, standing
Bronze medal – third place	2011 Sestriere	Giant slalom, standing
Bronze medal – third place	2017 Tarvisio	Super-G, standing
Bronze medal – third place	2019 Sella Nevea	Slalom, standing
Bronze medal – third place	2023 Lleida	Slalom, standing
Bronze medal – third place	2023 Lleida	Giant slalom, standing

Andrea Rothfuss (born 20 October 1989) is a German para-alpine skier. She has a disability: she was born without a left hand.

== Career ==
She skied at the 2011 IPC Alpine Skiing World Championships. She was the first skier to finish in the standing women's downhill race and the slalom race. She was the second skier to finish in the Super Combined. She was the third skier to finish in the Super-G race and the giant slalom Race.
