= 2011 IPC Alpine Skiing World Championships =

- Host city: Sestriere, Italy
- Nations: 23
- Athletes: 130
- Dates: January 14 – 23

The 2011 IPC Alpine Skiing World Championships was held in Sestriere, Italy, from January 14 to 23, 2011. IPC stands for International Paralympic Committee.

Skiers competed in sitting, standing or visually impaired classification categories in Downhill, giant slalom, Slalom, Super-G, Super Combined and Team events.

Over 130 skiers competed, including German multiple-Paralympic medalist Gerd Schönfelder, who competed in classification-category standing events.

Sestriere hosted the Paralympic alpine skiing competition, at the 2006 Winter Paralympics.

The internet-TV channel ParalympicSport.TV, owned by the International Paralympic Committee (IPC) broadcast daily live coverage of the Championships, from January 18–23, also available after the Championships as Video on Demand (VOD). They also added some interview clips to their YouTube channel.

== Opening ceremony ==
On January 15, the opening ceremony was held at the Palazzetto dello Sport in the town square of Sestriere, and included a series of performances by three dance couples. The dancers were to represent the people of the region. Among the dignitaries in attendance was the IPC President Sir Philip Craven.

== Medal winners ==
The men's events and the women's events were held at Kandahar Banchetta Giovanni N., in Sestriere. Visually impaired skiers compete with the help of a sighted guide. The skier with the visual impairment and the guide are considered a team, and dual medals are awarded.

=== Men ===
Event	Date	Class	Gold	Time	Silver	Time	Bronze	Time
Downhill details	Jan 16	Visually impaired	Nicolas Berejny; Guide: Gregory Nouhaud; France	1:21.40	Yon Santacana Maiztegui; Guide: Miguel Galindo Garces; Spain	1:21.59	Chris Williamson; Guide: Robin Femy; Canada	1:22.76
Downhill details	Jan 16	Standing	Gerd Schönfelder; Germany	1:21.84	Vincent Gauthier-Manuel; France	1:22.08	Thomas Pfyl; Switzerland	1:22.96
Downhill details	Jan 16	Sitting	Akira Kano; Japan	1:20.94	Taiki Morii; Japan	1:21.39	Kees-Jan van der Klooster; Netherlands	1:21.63
Super-G details	Jan 18	Visually impaired	Yon Santacana Maiztegui; Guide: Miguel Galindo Garces; Spain	1:19.20	Chris Williamson; Guide: Robin Femy; Canada	1:19.50	Nicolas Berejny; Guide: Gregory Nouhaud; France	1:20.47
Super-G details	Jan 18	Standing	Gerd Schönfelder; Germany	1:19.22	Vincent Gauthier-Manuel; France	1:19.26	Thomas Pfyl; Switzerland	1:19.95
Super-G details	Jan 18	Sitting	Christopher Devlin-Young; United States	1:17.67	Taiki Morii; Japan	1:18.29	Cyril More; France	1:19.50
Super Combined details	Jan 19	Visually impaired	Yon Santacana Maiztegui; Guide: Miguel Galindo Garces; Spain	2:07.43	Jakub Krako; Guide: Dusan Simo; Slovakia	2:08.36	Chris Williamson; Guide: Robin Femy; Canada	2:09.29
Super Combined details	Jan 19	Standing	Vincent Gauthier-Manuel; France	2:05.31	Gerd Schönfelder; Germany	2:07.06	Thomas Pfyl; Switzerland	2:08.88
Super Combined details	Jan 19	Sitting	Takeshi Suzuki; Japan	2:07.79	Cyril More; France	2:08.93	Yohann Taberlet; France	2:09.98
Slalom details	Jan 20	Visually impaired	Jakub Krako; Guide: Dusan Simo; Slovakia	1:28.83	Yon Santacana Maiztegui; Guide: Miguel Galindo Garces; Spain	1:29.11	Chris Williamson; Guide: Robin Femy; Canada	1:30.68
Slalom details	Jan 20	Standing	Vincent Gauthier-Manuel; France	1:27.05	Gerd Schönfelder; Germany	1:27.22	Toby Kane; Australia	1:28.49
Slalom details	Jan 20	Sitting	Takeshi Suzuki; Japan	1:29.31	Yohann Taberlet; France	1:32.24	Thomas Nolte; Germany	1:33.76
Giant slalom details	Jan 22	Visually impaired	Yon Santacana Maiztegui; Guide: Miguel Galindo Garces; Spain	2:10.78	Jakub Krako; Guide: Dusan Simo; Slovakia	2:12.10	Radomir Dudas; Guide: Maros Hudik; Slovakia	2:17.42
Giant slalom details	Jan 22	Standing	Vincent Gauthier-Manuel; France	2:10.98	Thomas Pfyl; Switzerland	2:11.41	Gerd Schönfelder; Germany	2:11.47
Giant slalom details	Jan 22	Sitting	Taiki Morii; Japan	2:15.79	Takeshi Suzuki; Japan	2:15.90	Christoph Kunz; Switzerland	2:16.11

=== Women ===
Event	Date	Class	Gold	Time	Silver	Time	Bronze	Time
Downhill details	Jan 16	Visually impaired	Henrieta Farkasova; Guide: Natalia Subrtova; Slovakia	1:28.36	Melissa Perrine; Guide: Andrew Bor; Australia	1:40.50	Alexandra Frantseva; Guide: Evgenia Kolosovskaya; Russia	1:41.87
Downhill details	Jan 16	Standing	Andrea Rothfuss; Germany	1:29.62	Marie Bochet; France	1:29.86	Solène Jambaqué; France	1:30.09
Downhill details	Jan 16	Sitting	Alana Nichols; United States	1:30.45	Laurie Stephens; United States	1:33.05	Claudia Loesch; Austria	1:35.35
Super-G details	Jan 18	Visually impaired	Anna Kuliskova; Guide: Michaela Hubacova; Czech Republic	1:34.28	Alexandra Frantseva; Guide: Evgenia Kolosovskaya; Russia	1:35.49	Melissa Perrine; Guide: Andrew Bor; Australia	1:38.08
Super-G details	Jan 18	Standing	Solène Jambaqué; France	1:25.08	Marie Bochet; France	1:25.48	Andrea Rothfuss; Germany	1:26.48
Super-G details	Jan 18	Sitting	Alana Nichols; United States	1:27.56	Laurie Stephens; United States	1:28.66	Claudia Loesch; Austria	1:29.04
Super Combined details	Jan 19	Visually impaired	Henrieta Farkasova; Guide: Natalia Subrtova; Slovakia	2:25.83	Alexandra Frantseva; Guide: Evgenia Kolosovskaya; Russia	2:32.31	Melissa Perrine; Guide: Andrew Bor; Australia	2:32.84
Super Combined details	Jan 19	Standing	Solène Jambaqué; France	2:21.94	Andrea Rothfuss; Germany	2:22.28	Karolina Wisniewska; Canada	2:25.79
Super Combined details	Jan 19	Sitting	Anna Schaffelhuber; Germany	2:31.62	Claudia Loesch; Austria	2:33.11	Laurie Stephens; United States	2:42.68
Slalom details	Jan 20	Visually impaired	Henrieta Farkasova; Guide: Natalia Subrtova; Slovakia	1:42.71	Kelly Gallagher; Guide: Charlotte Evans; Great Britain	1:47.67	Alexandra Frantseva; Guide: Evgenia Kolosovskaya; Russia	1:49.98
Slalom details	Jan 20	Standing	Andrea Rothfuss; Germany	1:39.98	Petra Smarzova; Slovakia	1:43.72	Karolina Wisniewska; Canada	1:45.53
Slalom details	Jan 20	Sitting	Anna Schaffelhuber; Germany	1:48.80	Claudia Loesch; Austria	1:52.62	Alana Nichols; United States	2:27.49
Giant slalom details	Jan 22	Visually impaired	Henrieta Farkasova; Guide: Natalia Subrtova; Slovakia	2:19.20	Alexandra Frantseva; Guide: Evgenia Kolosovskaya; Russia	2:28.73	Kelly Gallagher; Guide: Charlotte Evans; Great Britain	2:31.68
Giant slalom details	Jan 22	Standing	Marie Bochet; France	2:23.32	Petra Smarzova; Slovakia	2:24.55	Andrea Rothfuss; Germany	2:24.99
Giant slalom details	Jan 22	Sitting	Anna Schaffelhuber; Germany	2:31.73	Claudia Loesch; Austria	2:32.43	Alana Nichols; United States	2:38.22

=== Team ===
Event	Date	Class	Gold	Time	Silver	Time	Bronze	Time
Nations team event details	Jan 23	Open	France; Vincent Gauthier-Manuel, Nicolas Berejny; Guide: Gregory Nouhaud, Marie Bochet. Cyril More, Yohann Taberlet.	6:55.09	Germany; Gerd Schönfelder, Andrea Rothfuss, Thomas Nolte. Georg Kreiter, Franz Hanfstingl, Anna Schaffelhuber.	6:56.28	Slovakia; Henrieta Farkasova; Guide: Natalia Subrtova, Jakub Krako; Guide: Dusan Simo, Martin France. Norbert Holik; Guide: Lubos Bosela.	7:03.86

== Medals table ==
Rank	Nation	Gold	Silver	Bronze	Total
1	France (FRA)	8	6	4	18
2	Germany (GER)	7	4	4	15
3	Slovakia (SVK)	5	4	2	11
4	Japan (JPN)	4	3	0	7
5	United States (USA)	3	2	3	8
6	Spain (ESP)	3	2	0	5
7	Czech Republic (CZE)	1	0	0	1
8	Austria (AUT)	0	3	2	5
8	Russia (RUS)	0	3	2	5
10	Canada (CAN)	0	1	5	6
11	Switzerland (SUI)	0	1	4	5
12	Australia (AUS)	0	1	3	4
13	Great Britain (GBR)	0	1	1	2
14	Netherlands (NED)	0	0	1	1
Totals (14 entries)		31	31	31	93

== Participating nations ==
Over 130 participants from 23 nations competed.

- Australia
- Austria
- Belgium
- Canada
- Croatia
- Czech Republic
- Finland
- France
- Germany
- Italy
- Japan
- Netherlands
- New Zealand
- Russia
- Serbia
- Slovakia
- Slovenia
- South Korea
- Spain
- Sweden
- Switzerland
- United Kingdom
- United States

== Classifications ==
Skiers compete in sitting, standing or visually impaired events, after what classification of disability they have.

Standing

- LW2 – single leg amputation above the knee
- LW3 – double leg amputation below the knee, mild cerebral palsy, or equivalent impairment
- LW4 – single leg amputation below the knee
- LW5/7 – double arm amputation
- LW6/8 – single arm amputation
- LW9 – amputation or equivalent impairment of one arm and one leg

Sitting

- LW 10 – paraplegia with no or some upper abdominal function and no functional sitting balance
- LW 11 – paraplegia with fair functional sitting balance
- LW 12 – double leg amputation above the knees, or paraplegia with some leg function and good sitting balance

Visually impaired

- B1 – no functional vision
- B2 – up to ca 3–5% functional vision
- B3 – under 10% functional vision

== See also ==
- FIS Alpine World Ski Championships 2011
