= Mick Brennan (alpine skier) =

British alpine skier

Personal information
- Full name: Michael Brennan
- Nationality: British
- Born: 29 October 1979 (age 46)

Sport
- Country: Great Britain
- Sport: Alpine skiing
- Event(s): Super-G; Downhill; Super combined Slalom; Giant Slalom

Achievements and titles
- Paralympic finals: 2014 Sochi

Michael Brennan (born 29 October 1979) is a British alpine skier. Brennan lost both his lower legs in a bomb attack whilst serving in the British army in Iraq in 2004. His rehabilitation saw him first attempt to compete in the Summer Paralympics in Beijing before switching to alpine ski sports. In 2014 he qualified for the Great Britain team for the Winter Paralympics in Sochi as a sit-skier.

== Personal history ==
Brennan was born in 1979 and comes from the English town of Doncaster. He became a career soldier and joined the British Army. In January 2004, while on duty in Iraq, he answered a volunteer call to join the Royal Signal Bomb Squad, and became part of the Army's bomb disposal team. In late 2004, at the rank of sergeant, he was caught within the blast of a suicide bomb. The blast removed both of his legs below the knees and he landed heavily on his head placing him in a coma for two weeks. He was flown to Germany where he awoke from his coma, and spent the next three years attending Headley Court rehabilitation centre.

Brennan's physical recovery was hampered by mental health issues, caused by damage sustained to his head during the bomb attack. In a 2014 interview Brennan stated that people have difficulty reading his emotive state, and that he has difficulty handling his anger. In 2011 his anger management issues led to the collapse of his marriage and his discharge from the Army after being sent home for misbehaviour from a Combined Services skiing camp.

== Sports career ==
While at Headley Court, Brennan became first involved in parasport, joining the British Rowing project in 2007. Although not a favourite to break into an already established team, Brennan harboured aspirations to compete at the 2008 Summer Paralympics in Beijing. Although Brennan failed to make the team for Beijing, he continued entering sporting programs and in March 2008 he began to learn adaptive skiing. His natural ability saw him selected to join the Combined Services Disabled Ski Team and from there he was offered a place on the British Disabled Ski Team (BDST). In 2010 he made his first appearance on the slopes for the British national team.

In the 2011 World Championships he finished 19th in the sitting Slalom and 23rd in the sitting Giant Slalom. At the 2013 IPC Alpine Skiing World Championships in La Molina, Spain, he took 9th place in the super combined, but broke his sternum the next day while preparing to compete in the giant slalom. His broken sternum resulted in a six-month absence from the slopes. In an international event at Thredbo, Australia, in September 2013, he received a bronze medal for a third-place finish in the sitting giant slalom. However, after returning to competitive skiing in the Southern Hemisphere he broke his wrist, which limited his ability to practice and compete prior to the 2014 Winter Paralympics. Despite this lack of practice he qualified for the Great Britain team that would be competing at the Winter Paralympics in Sochi, Russia; competing in the sit-ski events. The Sochi Games was his Paralympic debut.

On arrival at Sochi, Brennan announced that he would not be competing at the downhill event, describing the slope as 'scary'. Expressing concerns shared by other competitors regarding the speed of the slope, Brennan was worried that it would be too dangerous to take part so soon after his recent injuries. Although out of the opening downhill competition, the next day Brennan took part in the Super-G event, finishing tenth, one of only 12 athletes out of the starting 31 to complete the course.
