= Andy Bor =

Australian ski coach & sighted guide

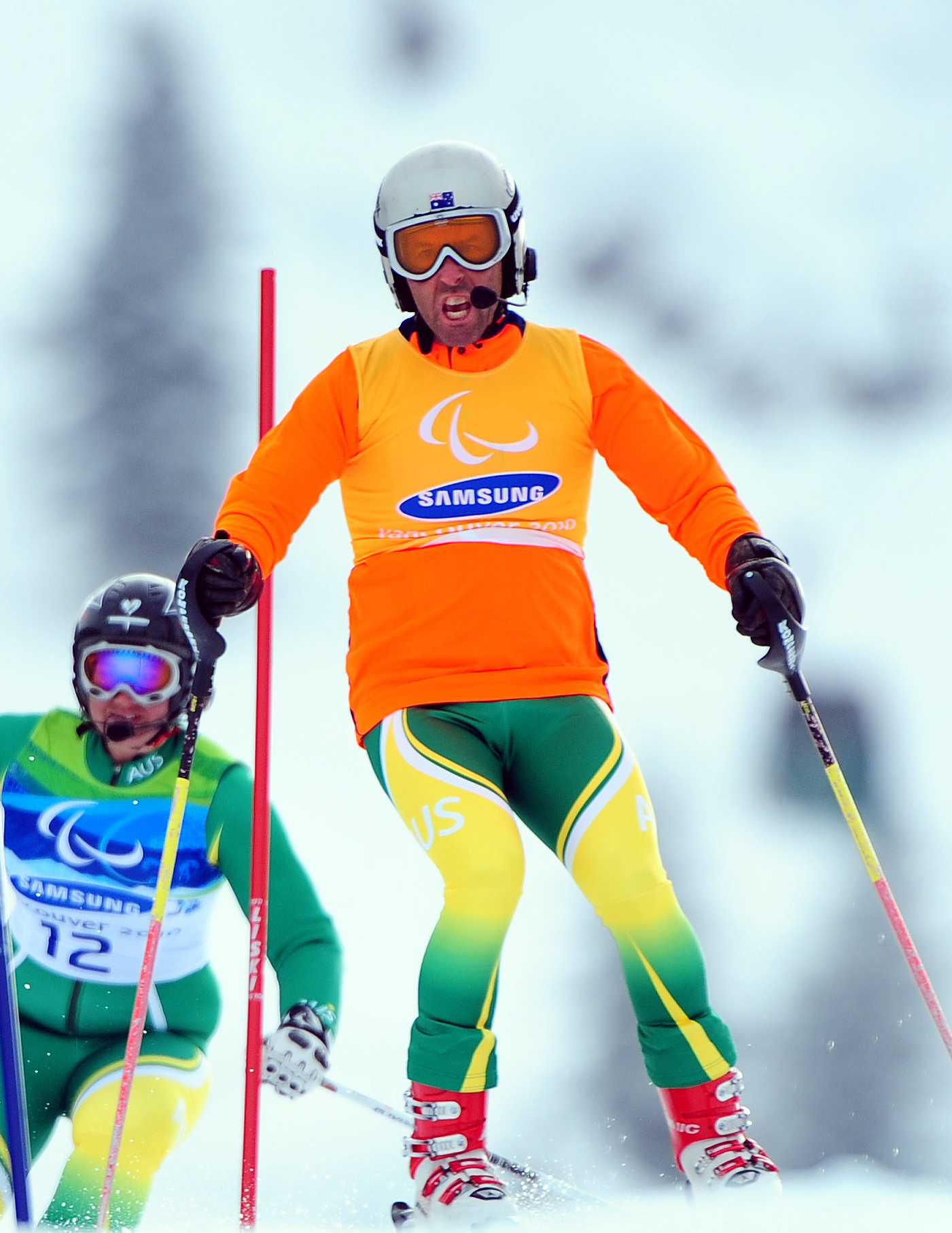
- Bor in 2014

Personal information
- Full name: Andrew Bor
- Born: 14 April 1963 (age 63)

Sport
- Country: Australia
- Sport: Para-alpine skiing
- Events: Downhill, super-G, giant slalom, slalom, super combined
Medal record
Guide for women's para-alpine skiing
Representing Australia
World Championships
Silver medal – second place	2011 Sestriere	Women's downhill VI
Bronze medal – third place	2011 Sestriere	Women's super-G
Bronze medal – third place	2011 Sestriere	Women's super combined
New Zealand Winter Games
Gold medal – first place	2011 Queenstown	Giant slalom visually impaired
Gold medal – first place	2011 Queenstown	Slalom visually impaired
Gold medal – first place	2011 Queenstown	Super G visually impaired

Andy Bor (born 14 April 1963) is an Australian former ski coach and sighted guide for visually impaired skiers. He was a coach at the 2006 Winter Paralympics in Turin, and was Melissa Perrine's guide skier at the 2010 Winter Paralympics in Vancouver and 2014 Winter Paralympics in Sochi.

Bor became Melissa Perrine's guide in 2009. He first skied with her in competition at the IPC North America Cup in Colorado, in 2009, where the pair finished second in the super-G. As Perrine's guide skier, he competed in the downhill, super-G, super combined, giant slalom and slalom events at Vancouver. They won silver in the downhill and bronze medals in super-G and super combined at the 2011 IPC Alpine Skiing World Championships in Sestriere. At an August 2011 Winter Games IPC event at Coronet Peak, Perrine and Bor finished first in the women's slalom visually impaired event.

At the 2014 Winter Paralympics in Sochi, Bor and Perrine finished fourth in the women's downhill for visually impaired. They were disqualified from the super combined event for a technical breach relating to a visor. They did not finish in the other events. https://mobile.abc.net.au/news/2014-03-12/perrine-disqualification-inexcusable3a-apc-boss/5315104 Perrine went on to win two bronze medals at the 2018 winter Paralympics in South Korea with another guide Christian Geiger. https://mobile.abc.net.au/news/2018-03-14/winter-paralympics-melissa-perrine-wins-second-pyeongchang-medal/9548398

Andy Bor has retired from competitive skiing and lives on the Gold Coast with his wife, herself a former Canadian winter Paralympian.

== Personal ==
Bor was born on 14 April 1963. He lives in the Gold Coast suburb of Tugun, Queensland, and works as a skiing coach.

== Skiing ==
Bor is a guide for visually impaired skiers. In this role, he skis in front of the visually impaired skier and gives him or her direction to get down the course using speakers and a microphone. At the 2006 Winter Paralympics in Turin, Bor served as an Australian assistant coach. In 2009, following those Games, he shifted his role to serve as Melissa Perrine's guide as Perrine advanced further in the sport. He first skied with Perrine at a World Cup event in January 2010 where they finished fourth.

Bor first represented Australia internationally in skiing in 2006. He first skied with Perrine in 2009 in competition at the IPC North America Cup in Colorado, where the pair finished second in the super-G. He was officially named to the Australian 2010 Winter Paralympics team in November 2009. A ceremony was held in Canberra with Australian Paralympic Committee president Greg Hartung and Minister for Sport Kate Ellis making the announcement. He and the rest of Australia's Para-alpine team arrived in the Paralympic village on 9 March 2010 for the 2010 Winter Paralympics. As Perrine's guide skier, he competed in the downhill, super-G, super combined, giant slalom and slalom events. He finished seventh in the visually impaired super-G, approximately 12.54 seconds behind gold medal-winning Slovak skier Henrieta Farkasova. He and Perrine finished fifth in the 2,139 metres (7,018 ft) long downhill course.

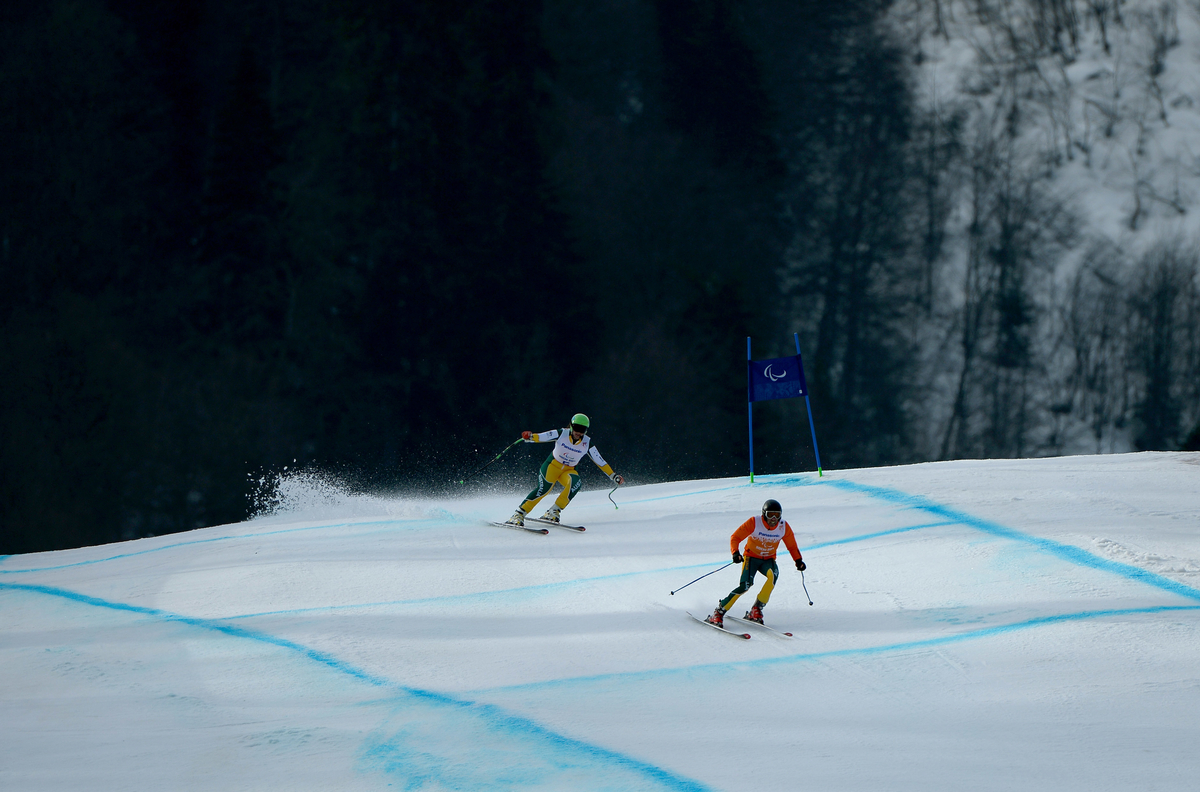
Melissa Perrine and her guide Andy Bor in the women's downhill at the 2014 Winter Paralympics

Andrew Bor interview originally conducted for Wikinews

Bor skied with Perrine at the 2011 IPC Alpine Skiing World Championships in Sestriere, where Perrine won a silver medal in the downhill and bronze medals in super-G and super combined. At an August 2011 Winter Games IPC event at Coronet Peak, she and Bor finished first in the women's slalom visually impaired event with a time of 1:58.63, about 50 seconds faster than the event's silver medallist, Jae Rim Yang skier with guide Ko Woon Chung.

Bor was Perrine's guide at a February 2012 World Cup event in Italy in the slalom, and finished third. For her two runs, she had a combined time of 2:11.03, less than a second behind the silver medal-finishing Danielle Umstead. She won a silver medal in the giant slalom, with a combined run time of 2:28.13, ten seconds behind the gold medallist.

At the 2014 Winter Paralympics in Sochi, Bor was again Melissa Perrine's guide. She finished fourth in the women's downhill for visually impaired, and did not finish in three other events. She was disqualified after the slalom leg of the women's super combined for wearing a visor which was taped to her helmet in order to keep rain from her goggles. This was a breach of the IPC Alpine Skiing rules. Jason Hellwig, CEO of the Australian Paralympic Committee, described it as a "mindnumbingly-dumb mistake", as it was not picked up by relevant team officials. He indicated that it was an honest mistake and there was no intention to cheat.
