= Jacob Guilera =

Personal information
- Nationality: Spanish
- Born: 30 March 1979 (age 46); Spain

Sport
- Country: Spain
- Sport: Para-alpine skiing
- Event(s): Downhill; Slalom; Giant slalom Super combined Super G
- Club: CE Taradell

Jacob Guilera Casas (born 30 March 1979) is a Spanish single arm amputee para-alpine standing skier. He has competed at the European Cup, the Paralympic Winter World Cup, the Italian National Championships, the World Cup, and the World Championships.

== Personal ==
Guilera is a left arm amputee. He is a trainer and coordinator for the Spanish disabled sports organisation, Play and Train. He resides in Bourg-Madame commune, France.

== Skiing ==
Guilera is a LW6/8-1 classified skier. He competes in the standing group, one of the three general disability types in para-alpine skiing. He has represented the Federación Catalana Minusvalids Fisics (FCMF) in at least one international skiing event.

Guilera competed at the 2007 IPC Alpine Skiing European Cup. At the last round of the European Cup in March 2008, an event held in La Molina, Spain, he was one of several Spanish skiers competing. He finished the 2007/2008 European Cup season in twenty-fourth place. He finished fifth in the super G, third in the giant slalom and fifth in the slalom at the 2008 Italian Alpine Skiing Championships, held in Sestriere. In January 2009, he participated at the IPC Alpine Skiing World Cup in La Molina. He was disqualified during the second run of the slalom event. He finished seventh in the overall standings of the giant slalom at the 2009 Paralympic Winter World Cup, held in Sollefteå, Sweden. Guilera competed in the super-G event of the 2009 IPC Alpine Skiing World Championships held in Jeongseon, South Korea; he did not advance to the finals. It was the first World Championship he had competed in. At the 2009 IPC Alpine Skiing European Cup, he finished eighth overall with 296 points.

Guilera was one of five – nine when guides are counted – Spanish skiers competing at the 2010 IPC Disabled Alpine Skiing World Cup, hosted in Sestriere. He finished the event in twenty-seventh place. At the 2010 European Cup, he finished fourth in the super combined event. At the January 2010 World Cup event in Austria, he finished twenty-fourth with a time of 2:28:29 in the giant slalom event. He was unable to compete in the super combined event because it was cancelled. He earned a bronze in the slalom event at the third European Cup event held in La Molina in late January 2010. He had two fourth places finished prior to earning his bronze. The Campionat de Catalunya Open d'Esquí Alpí took place in late January 2010 with skiers representing the five regions of Spain including Aragon, Galicia, Catalonia, Madrid and the Basque Country. He represented Catalonia as a member of the ski club, CE Taradell, and came in first in the standing category events. He participated in the standing category at the first World Cup event in the 2010/2011 season, which was held in Arta Terme, Italy in early January 2011. He finished sixteenth overall in the giant slalom with a time of 2:57.10. At the 2011 World Championships held in Sestriere, he finished eighteenth in the slalom event. Near the end of the 2011/2012 ski season, he participated in a World Cup event in Italy where he finished eighteenth in the giant slalom event.
