= Toby Kane =

Australian para-alpine skier (born 1986)

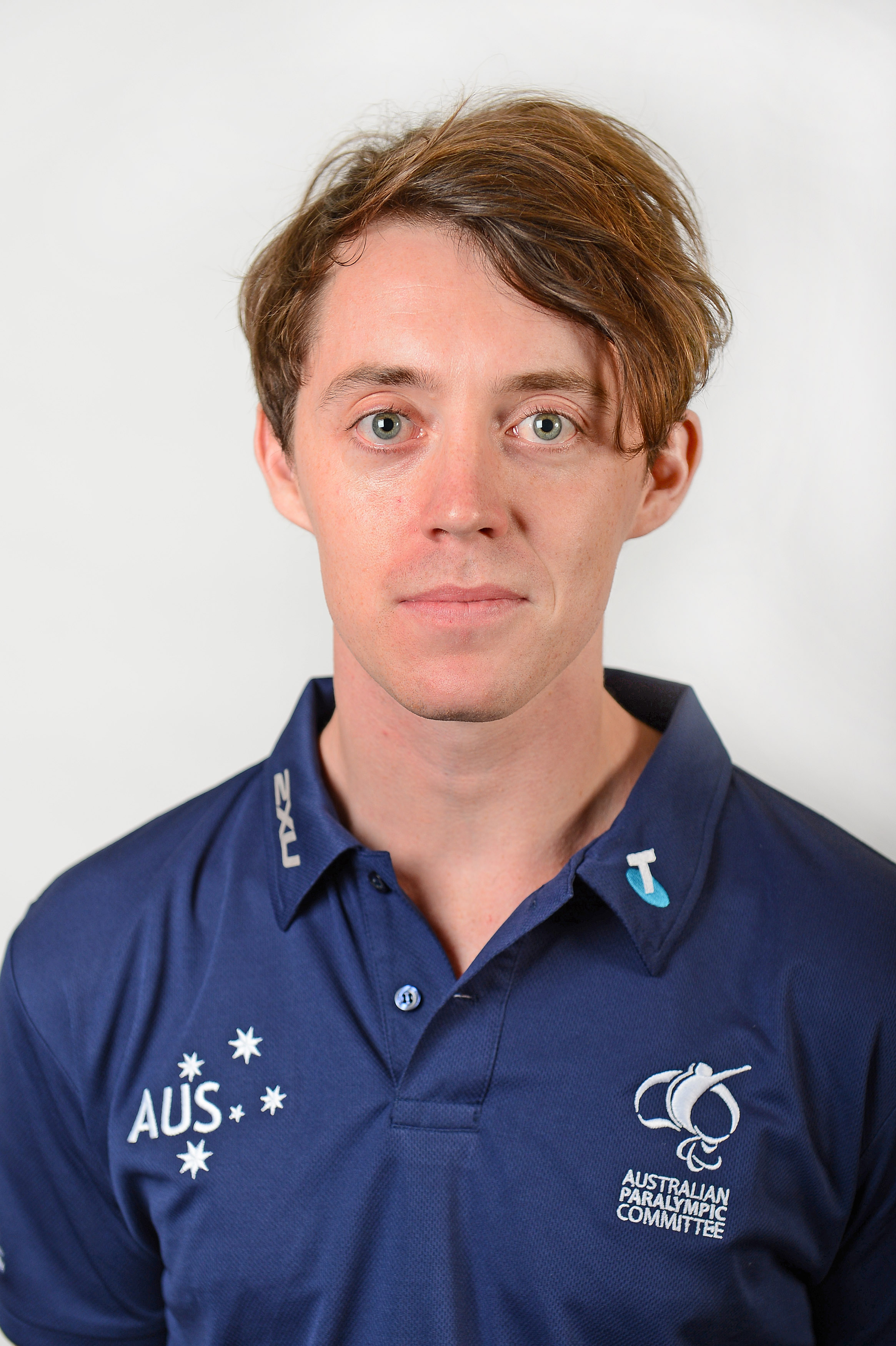
- Kane in 2013

Personal information
- Nickname: Tobes
- Nationality: Australian
- Born: 30 December 1986 (age 39) Sydney, Australia

Sport
- Disability class: LW2
Medal record
Men's para alpine skiing
Representing Australia
Paralympic Games
Bronze medal – third place	2006 Turin	Super-G
Bronze medal – third place	2014 Sochi	Super-G
World Championships
Bronze medal – third place	2004 Wildschönau	Super-G LW2
Bronze medal – third place	2011 Sestriere	Slalom Standing

Toby Kane (born 30 December 1986) is an Australian Paralympian who won a bronze medal in the men's super G Standing at the 2006 Winter Paralympics in Turin and a bronze medal in the men's super G standing in his third Winter Paralympics at the 2014 Winter Paralympics in Sochi. Invited to join the Australian Winter Paralympic Development team when he was just 11, he became the youngest member of the Australian team in Turin at the age of 19. He had the honour of being Australia's flag bearer at the closing ceremony in Turin, and at the opening ceremony in Vancouver. Towards the end of the Sochi Games, Kane and Dutch snowboarder Bibian Mentel-Spee were named winners of the Whang Youn Dai Achievement Award, which is presented at every Paralympic Games for outstanding performances and overcoming adversity.

== Personal ==
Cameron Rahles Rahbula, Mitchell Gourley and Toby Kane interview originally done for Wikinews

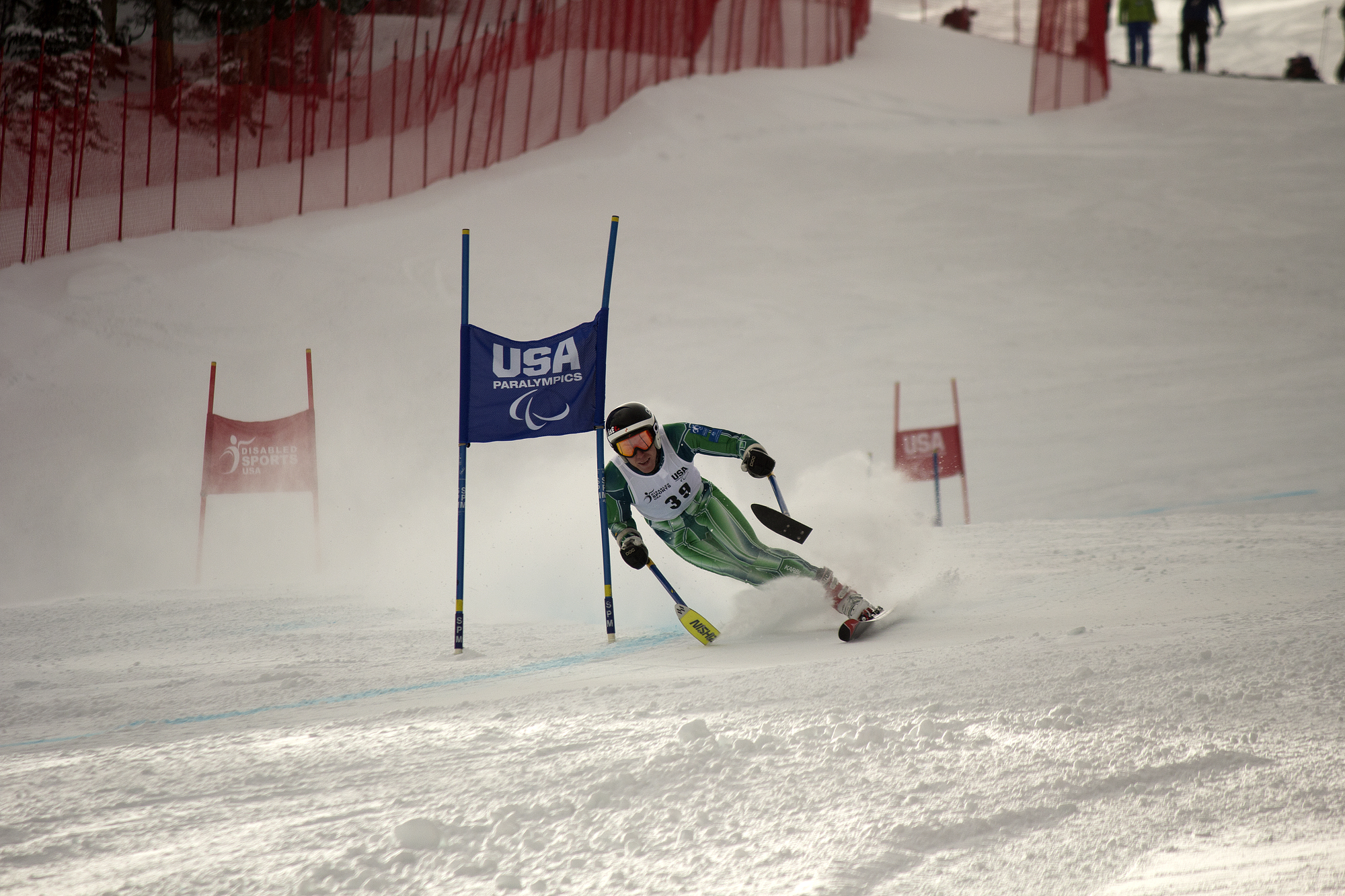
Toby Kane competing in the super-G during the second day of the 2012 IPC Nor Am Cup at Copper Mountain

Toby Kane was born in Sydney on 30 December 1986, the oldest son of Sally and Steve Kane. He has an older brother Tim. At the age of two, he lost his lower right leg after being run over by a car on the footpath. He took up skiing because his aunt and uncle owned a chalet in the Snowy Mountains at Smiggin Holes, New South Wales. He has a Bachelor of Medical Science, and studied for a double degree in medicine and surgery at the University of Notre Dame in Sydney.

== Skiing ==
Kane's talent was identified whilst skiing at Smiggin Holes, New South Wales, and he was invited to join the Australian Winter Paralympic Development team when he was 11. At the age of 19, Kane was the youngest member of the Australian team at 2006 Winter Paralympics in Turin. Classified as LW2, he won a bronze medal in the men's super G, emerging from the shadows of legendary Australian Le2 alpine skier Michael Milton. He also competed in the downhill, coming 9th; slalom, coming 16th; and the giant slalom, in which he did not finish.

At the 2010 Winter Paralympics in Vancouver, Kane competed in five men's events – downhill, coming tenth, giant slalom placing tenth, slalom, coming eleventh, and super Combined and super G, in which he did not finish. He had the honour of being Australia's flag bearer at two Winter Paralympic Games – carrying the flag at the closing ceremony in Turin, and at the opening ceremony in Vancouver.

Kane won a bronze medal in the men's super G LW2 at the 2004 IPC Alpine Skiing World Championships in Wildschönau, Austria. After a break from sport, he returned to the slopes at the 2011 IPC Alpine Skiing World Championships in Sestriere, Italy, where he won a bronze medal in the slalom after posting a string of frustrating fourth places in the downhill, super G and super combined. During the 2011/12 IPC Alpine Skiing World Cup season, he won another bronze in the giant slalom, and during the 2012/13 season, won a gold, two silvers and a bronze medal at the 2012 North America Cup. He followed this up with bronze in the giant slalom in the World Cup series.

Kane was an Australian Institute of Sport and New South Wales Institute of Sport scholarship holder from 2002 to 2014. In 2011, he received a Sport Achievement Award from the Australian Institute of Sport.

Kane competed in five events at the 2014 Winter Paralympics in Sochi, winning a bronze medal in the men's super G behind Russia's Alexey Bugaev and Austria's Matthias Lanzinger. It was Australia's first medal at the Sochi Games. On winning his bronze medal, he announced that he would retire at the conclusion of the Games, ending his career on a high note. He went on to finish fourth in the men's slalom standing and sixth in the men's downhill standing, and failed to finish in two events. Towards the end of the Games, Kane and Dutch snowboarder Bibian Mentel-Spee were named winners of the Whang Youn Dai Achievement Award, which is presented at every Paralympic Games for outstanding performances and overcoming adversity.

Kane announced his retirement following the 2014 Paralympics, with the intent to pursue a career in medicine.

In September 2025, Kane was appointed Deputy chef de mission for the upcoming 2026 Winter Paralympics in Milano Cortina.
