= Yohann Taberlet =

French para-alpine skier (born 1981)

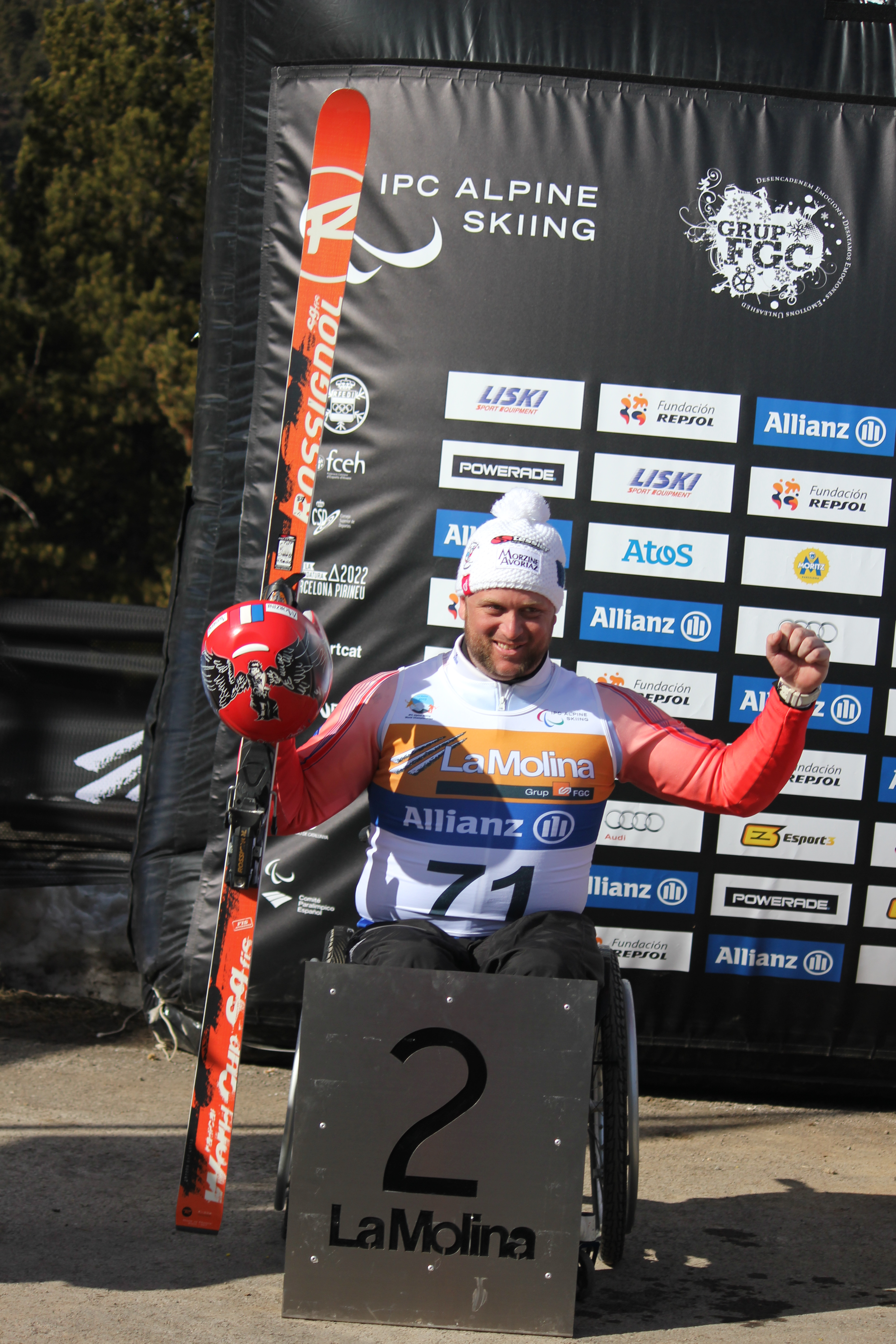
Yohann Taberlet at the 2013 IPC Alpine Skiing World Champions

Yohann Taberlet (born 29 March 1981) is a French skier. He has a disability and uses a wheelchair. He skied at the 2011 IPC Alpine Skiing World Championships. He was the second skier to finish in the men's sitting slalom race and was the third skier to finish in the sitting men's Super Combined race.
