= Kirk Schornstein =

Canadian paralympic alpine skier (born 1993)

Personal information
- Born: 19 March 1993 (age 33) Edmonton, Alberta, Canada

Sport
- Country: Canada
- Sport: Para-alpine skiing
Medal record
Representing Canada
World Para Championships
Para-alpine skiing
Silver medal – second place	2017 Tarvisio	Men's downhill standing

Kirk Schornstein (born 19 March 1993) is a Canadian paralympic alpine skier. He participated at the 2010, 2014 and 2018 Winter Paralympics in the alpine skiing competition. Schornstein also participated at the 2017 World Para Alpine Skiing Championships, being awarded the silver medal in the men's downhill standing event.
