= Robin Femy =

Canadian para-alpine skier

Robin Karl Femy
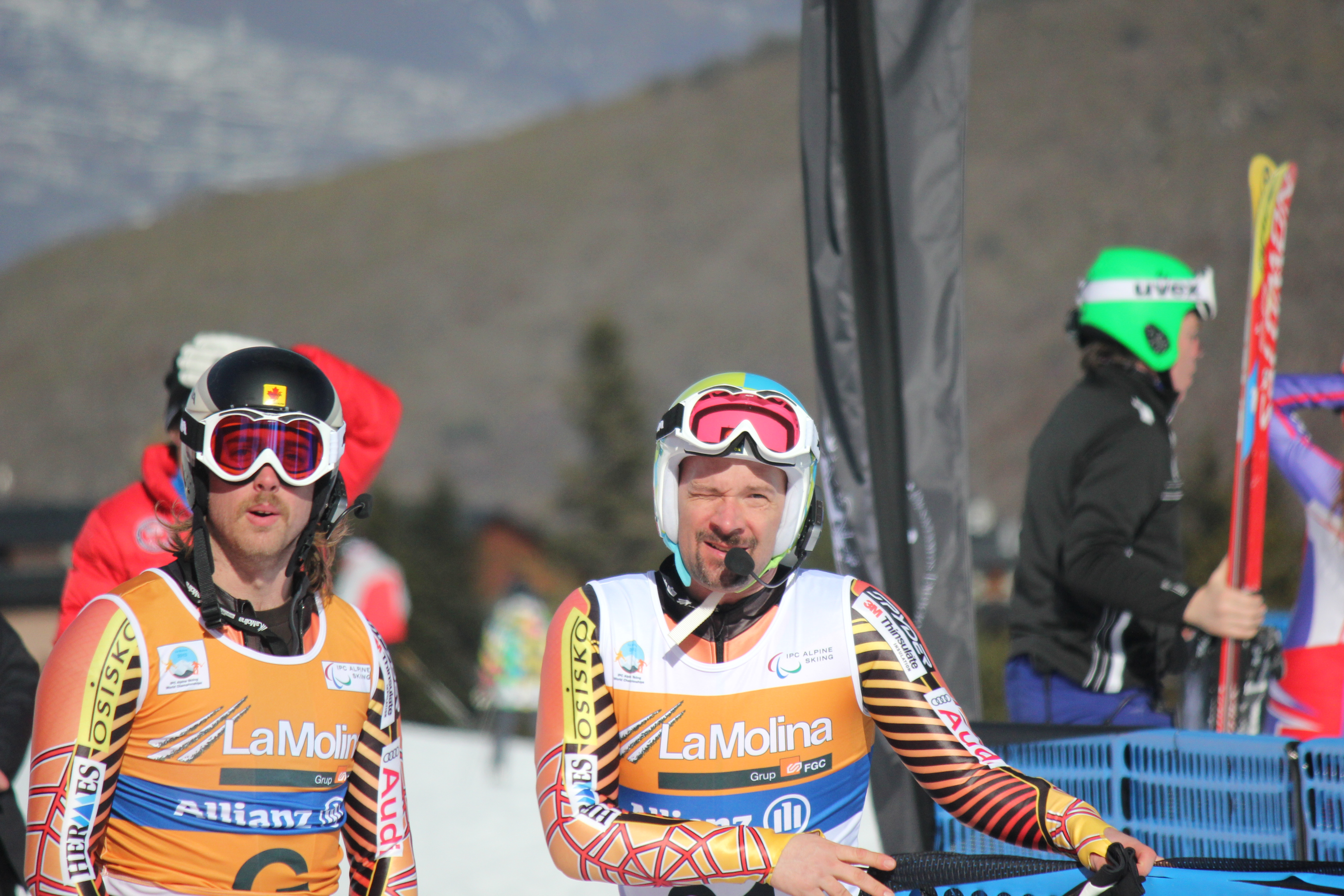

Personal information
- Born: 19 October 1989 (age 36)
- Height: 6'1

Sport
- Sport: Skiing
Medal record
Alpine skiing
Representing Canada
Paralympic Games
Gold medal – first place	2014 Sochi	Giant slalom (guide)
Bronze medal – third place	2014 Sochi	Super-G (guide)
Bronze medal – third place	2014 Sochi	Downhill (guide)

Robin Femy (born 19 October 1989) is a skier and sighted guide from Canada. He currently serves as Mac Marcoux's guide. The pair won three medals in alpine skiing at the 2014 Winter Paralympics, including gold in the men's visually impaired giant slalom.

Femy skied at the 2011 IPC Alpine Skiing World Championships with Chris Williamson. The pair scored a handful of medals; this included second in the men's visually impaired Super-G race, third in the visually impaired men's downhill, men's visually impaired Super Combined and slalom races.
