= Petra Smaržová =

Slovak para-alpine skier (born 1990)

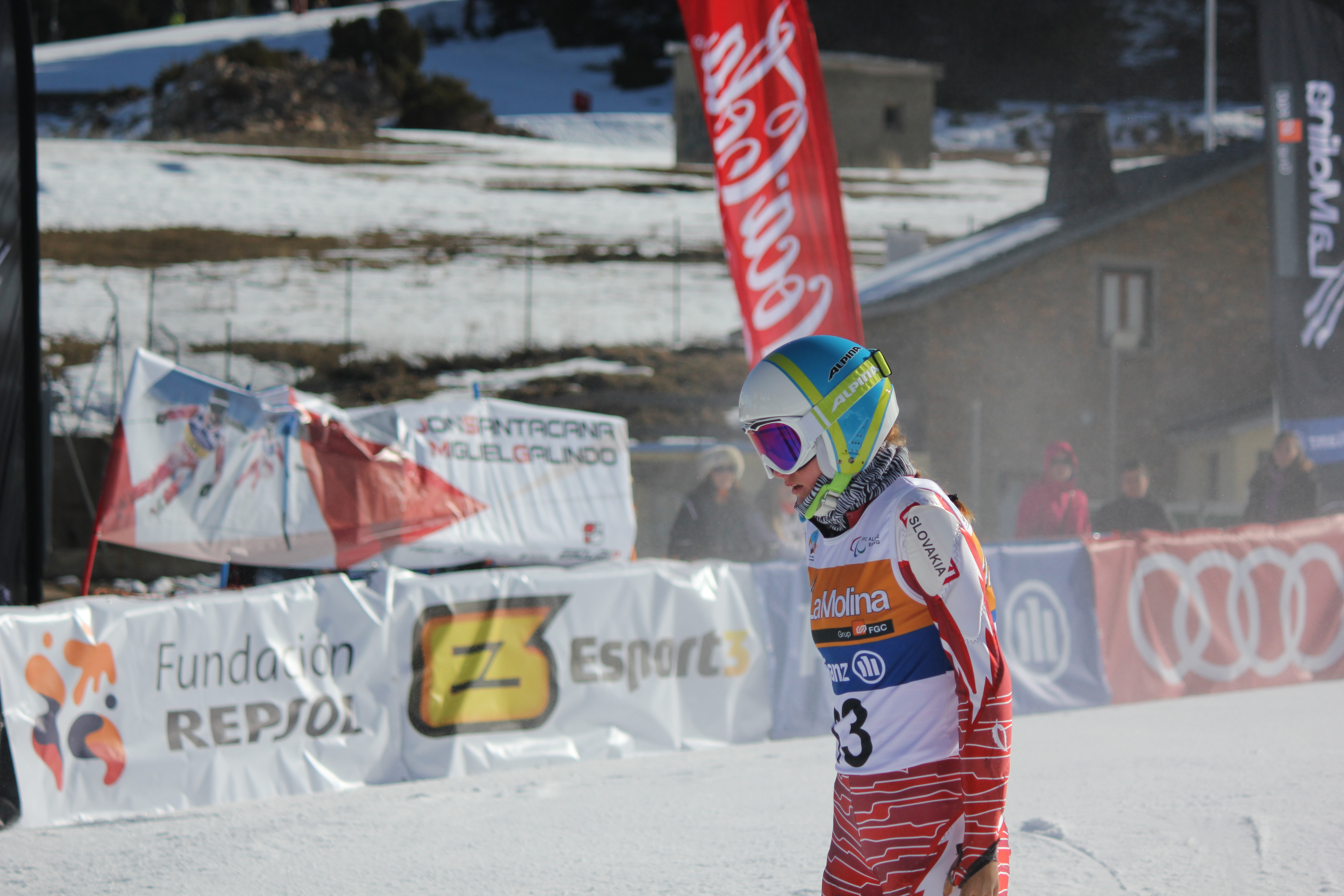
- Smaržová at the 2013 IPC Alpine Skiing World Champions

Personal information
- Born: 4 June 1990 (age 36) Valašské Meziříčí, Czechoslovakia

Sport
- Sport: Skiing
Medal record
Women's para alpine skiing Standing
Representing Slovakia
Paralympic Games
Bronze medal – third place	2010 Vancouver	Giant slalom
Bronze medal – third place	2014 Sochi	Slalom
IPC Alpine Skiing World Championships
Silver medal – second place	2011 Sestriere	Slalom
Silver medal – second place	2011 Sestriere	Giant slalom
Bronze medal – third place	2019 Kranjska Gora	Giant slalom

Petra Smaržová (born 4 June 1990) is a disabled skier from Slovakia.

== Life ==
Smaržová was born in Valašské Meziříčí on 4 June 1990. Smaržová speaks English, German and Slovak. She started her skiing career at the World Championships in Austria in 2002.

She was the second skier to finish in the standing women's slalom race and giant slalom race at the 2011 IPC Alpine Skiing World Championships.

Smaržová also took part in the 2014 Winter Olympic Games in Sochi, where she again competed in the women's slalom. She is coached by Peter Matiasko and Branislav Mazgut.

In 2021 she was at the World Cup in St. Moritz in Switzerland. There were five Slovaks representing their country.
