= Takeshi Suzuki (alpine skier) =

Japanese Para alpine skier (born 1988)

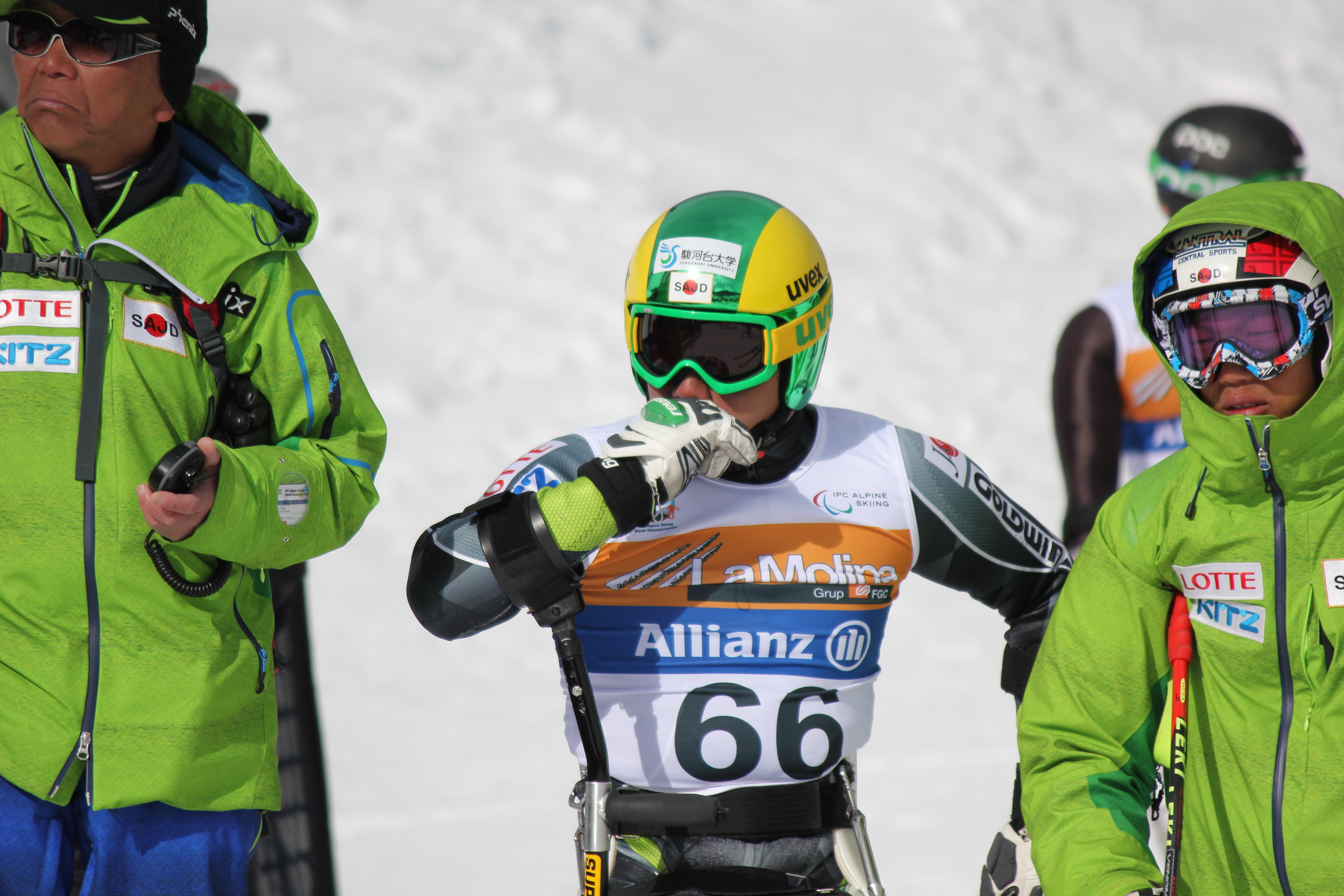
- Suzuki at the 2013 World Championships

Personal information
- Born: May 1, 1988 (age 38) Inawashiro, Fukushima, Japan

Sport
- Country: Japan
- Sport: Para alpine skiing
- Disability class: LW12-2
- Events: Downhill slalom Giant slalom Super combined Super G
Medal record
Men's Para alpine skiing
Representing Japan
Paralympic Games
| Gold medal – first place | 2014 Sochi | Slalom, sitting |
| Bronze medal – third place | 2010 Vancouver | Giant slalom, sitting |
| Bronze medal – third place | 2014 Sochi | Downhill, sitting |
| Bronze medal – third place | 2026 Milano Cortina | Slalom, sitting |
IPC Alpine Skiing World Championships
| Gold medal – first place | 2015 Panorama | Slalom, sitting |
| Silver medal – second place | 2013 La Molina | Super combined, sitting |
| Silver medal – second place | 2013 La Molina | Giant slalom, sitting |

Takeshi Suzuki (鈴木 猛史, Suzuki Takeshi; born May 1, 1988) is a Japanese Para alpine skier and Paralympic athlete. He won a gold medal in the slalom event at the 2014 Winter Paralympics in Sochi, Russia.

== Career ==
He competed in the 2006 Winter Paralympics in Turin, Italy, where he became 4th in the Downhill and 12th in the Slalom, sitting.

He competed in the 2010 Winter Paralympics in Vancouver, Canada. He won a bronze medal in the Giant slalom, sitting. He became 5th at the Super combined, 5th in the Super-G, 11th at the Downhill and 15th at the Slalom, sitting.
