= Alana Nichols =

U.S. athlete

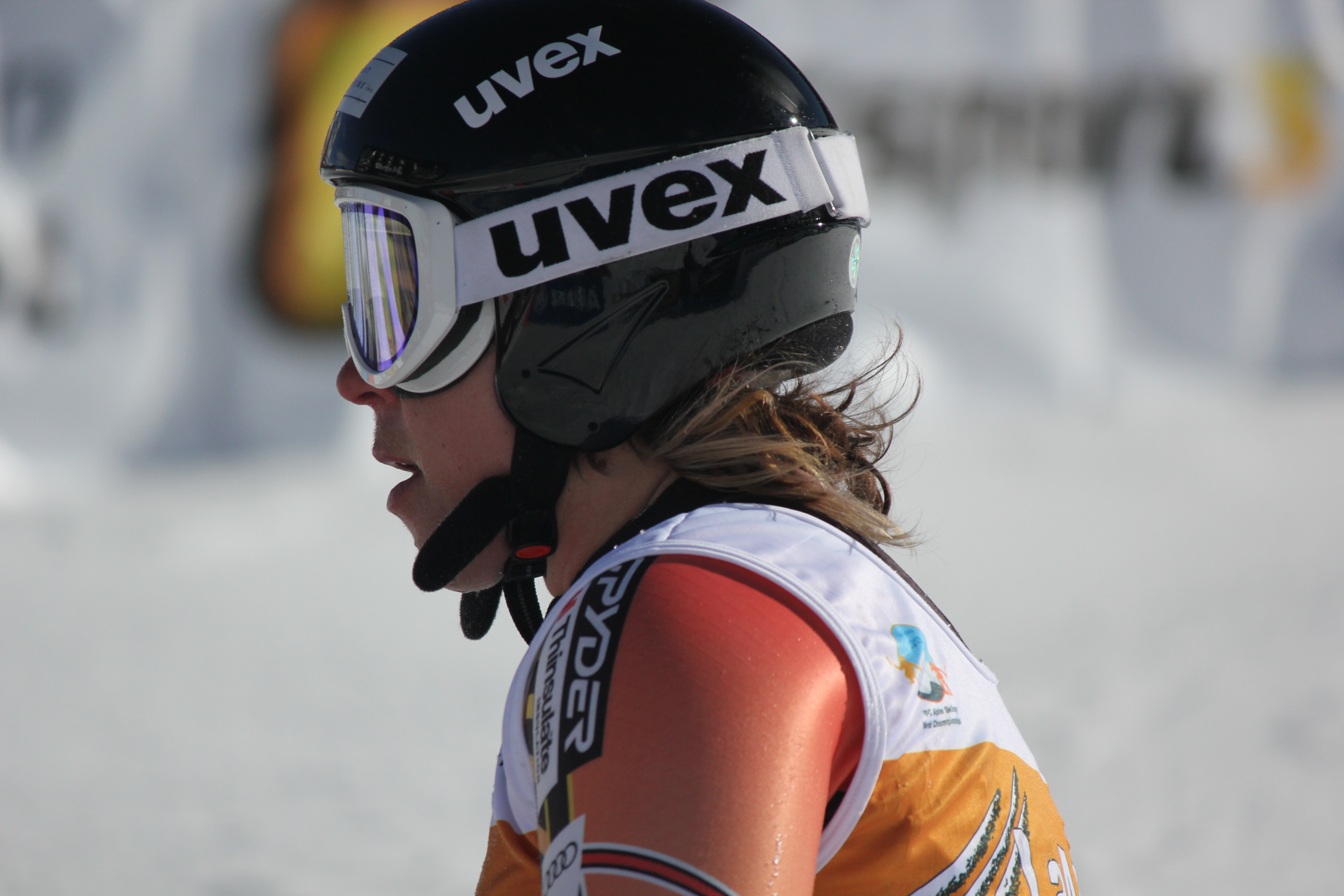
- IPC Alpine World Championships in La Molina, Spain. Super-G event on Thursday. Women's sit skier Alana Nichols of the United States

Personal information
- Full name: Alana Jane Nichols
- Nationality: American
- Born: March 21, 1983 (age 43)

Sport
- Country: United States
- Sport: Wheelchair basketball, Alpine skiing
Medal record
Representing United States
Wheelchair basketball
Paralympic Games
Gold medal – first place	2008 Beijing	Women's team
Alpine skiing
Paralympic Games
Gold medal – first place	2010 Vancouver	Downhill sitting
Gold medal – first place	2010 Vancouver	Giant slalom sitting
Silver medal – second place	2010 Vancouver	Super-G sitting
Silver medal – second place	2014 Sochi	Downhill sitting
Bronze medal – third place	2010 Vancouver	Super combined sitting

Alana Jane Nichols (born March 21, 1983) is an American Paralympic wheelchair basketball player and alpine skier.

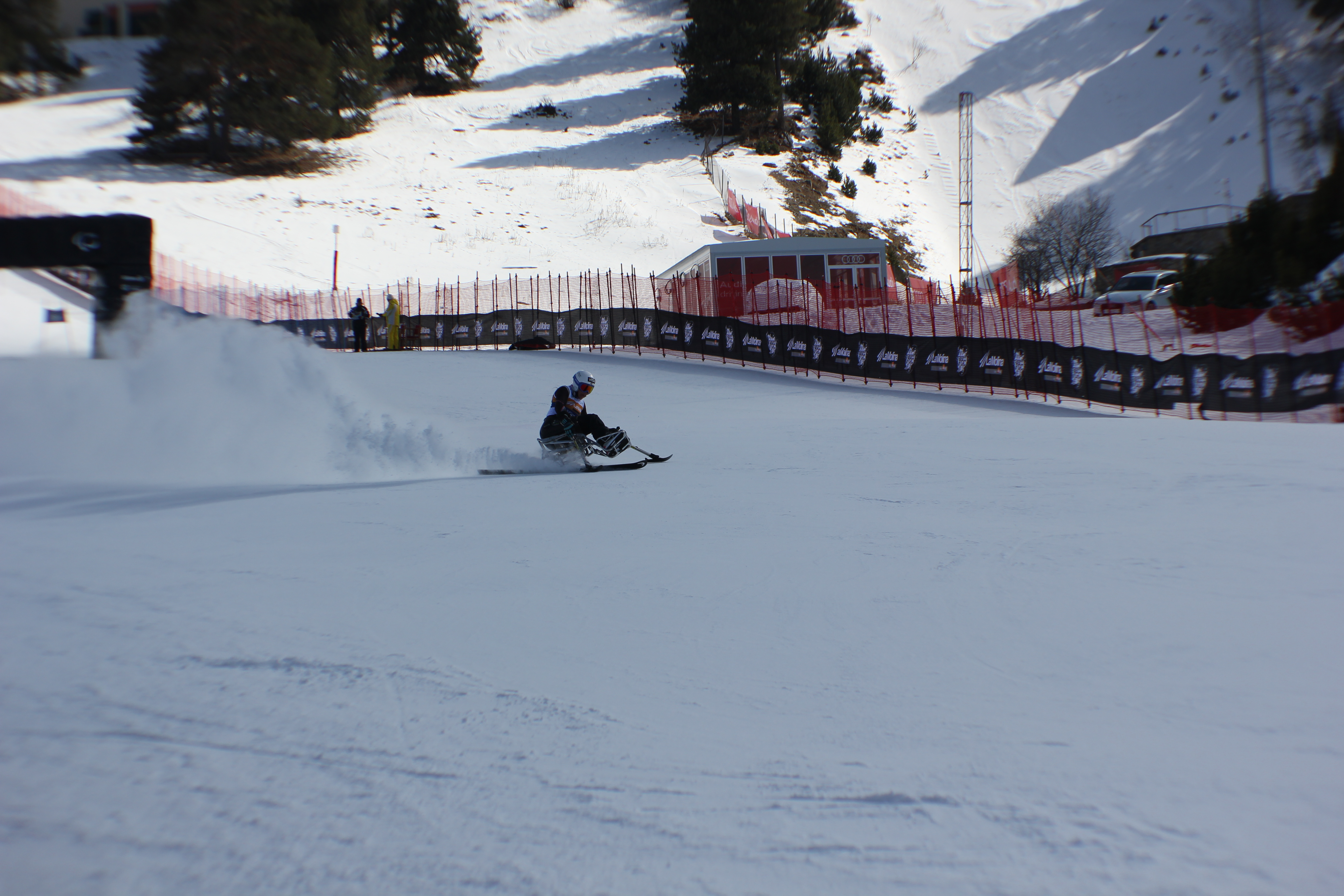
IPC Alpine World Championships. Women's giant slalom.

== Childhood ==
Alana Nichols was born in New Mexico and when she was nine months old, her father was killed by a drunk driver. Because her mother was struggling to raise Nichols and three other siblings, Nichols and her older sister, Jovan, were sent to their grandparents in Farmington, New Mexico. Growing up, Nichols spent winters snowboarding in Colorado. During one such snowboarding trip in 2000, she attempted a back flip but over-rotated and landed back-first on a rock. When the accident occurred, Nichols was taken by helicopter to the San Juan Regional Medical Center in Farmington and it took eight hours of surgery to reconstruct her back with two rods and three pins. The injury broke her T10/11 vertebrae and left her paralyzed from the waist down.

== College years ==
Nine months after her accident, Nichols headed to the University of New Mexico to join her sister. It was there, in 2002, that Nichols was introduced to wheelchair basketball and quickly excelled at the sport. After discovering the sport Nichols transferred to the University of Arizona, where she studied special education rehab and school psychology. She later attended graduate school at the University of Alabama, eventually graduating with a master's degree in kinesiology.

== Olympic career ==
Nichols is a five-time Paralympian (2008, 2010, 2012, 2014, 2016) and a six-time medalist (3 gold, 2 silver, 1 bronze). After serving as an alternate for the U.S. women's team at the 2004 Summer Paralympics in Athens, was named to the national team in 2005, and helped the team win a silver medal in the 2006 Wheelchair Basketball World Championship. Her Paralympic debut came in 2008 when, as part of the U.S. women's team, she won a gold medal in wheelchair basketball at the Beijing games.

One month after the Beijing Paralympics, Nichols moved from Alabama to Colorado to begin training in alpine skiing. She had tried adaptive skiing in 2002, but at the time had chosen to focus on basketball instead. After watching the skiing events at the 2006 Winter Paralympics and learning of the National Sports Center for the Disabled (NSCD) in Winter Park, Colorado, she decided to pursue the sport as soon as the 2008 Summer Paralympics were completed. She began practicing with the NSCD program and showed quick improvement. Her first win came in February 2009 when she beat Paralympic gold medalist Laurie Stephens to take first in the super-G at a North American Cup event in Kimberley, British Columbia. She won the downhill event and placed third in the super combined at the U.S. Adaptive Nationals later that year. In March 2010, she completed her first IPC Alpine World Cup season with a first place in the downhill, second in super combined, and third in super-G. Later in March, she competed in the 2010 Winter Paralympic Games in Vancouver, BC, Canada where she won two gold medals, a silver medal and a bronze medal. She placed first in the downhill and the giant slalom, second in the super-G, and third in the super combined. Nichols is the first American woman with gold medals in the summer and winter games.

In 2012, Nichols competed in the London Paralympics, where the United States women's wheelchair basketball team placed fourth. Leading up to the 2014 Paralympic Winter Games in Sochi, Russia, Nichols tore three ligaments while training. Despite this injury, she was able to recover and earn a silver medal in the downhill. In 2016, Nichols made her debut in the paracanoe at the Paralympic Games Rio.

== Media career ==
Nichols commentated for NBC during the 2021 Tokyo Paralympics.
