= List of flag bearers for South Africa at the Olympics =

South Africa at the Olympics
- IOC code: RSA
- NOC: South African Sports Confederation and Olympic Committee
- Website: www.sascoc.co.za
- Medals: Gold 28 Silver 36 Bronze 31 Total 95

Summer appearances
- 1904; 1908; 1912; 1920; 1924; 1928; 1932; 1936; 1948; 1952; 1956; 1960; 1964–1988; 1992; 1996; 2000; 2004; 2008; 2012; 2016; 2020; 2024

Winter appearances
- 1960; 1964–1992; 1994; 1998; 2002; 2006; 2010; 2014; 2018; 2022; 2026

This is a list of flag bearers who have represented South Africa at the Olympics.

Flag bearers carry the national flag of their country at the opening ceremony of the Olympic Games.

#	Event year	Season	Flag bearer	Sport
1	1908	Summer	Doug Stupart	Athletics
2	1912	Summer		
3	1920	Summer		
4	1924	Summer		
5	1928	Summer		
6	1932	Summer	Harry Hart	Athletics
7	1936	Summer	Clarke Scholtz	Athletics
8	1948	Summer		
9	1952	Summer	Schalk Booysen	Athletics
10	1956	Summer		
11	1960	Winter		
12	1960	Summer	Manie van Zyl	Wrestling
13	1992	Summer	Jan Tau (Note: Tau carried a special sporting flag for South Africa, rather than an official national flag.)	Athletics
14	1994	Winter	Dino Quattrocecere	Figure Skating
15	1996	Summer	Masibulele Makepula	Boxing
16	1998	Winter	Shirene Human	Figure Skating
17	2000	Summer	Hezekiel Sepeng	Athletics
18	2002	Winter	Alexander Heath	Alpine Skiing
19	2004	Summer	Mbulaeni Mulaudzi	Athletics
20	2006	Winter	Alexander Heath	Alpine Skiing
21	2008	Summer	Natalie du Toit	Swimming
22	2010	Winter	Oliver Kraas	Cross-Country Skiing
23	2012	Summer	Caster Semenya	Athletics
24	2016	Summer	Wayde van Niekerk	Athletics
25	2018	Winter	Connor Wilson	Alpine skiing
26	2020	Summer	Chad le Clos	Swimming
26	2020	Summer	Phumelela Mbande	Field hockey
27	2024	Summer	Akani Simbine	Athletics
27	2024	Summer	Caitlin Rooskrantz	Gymnastics

== See also ==
- South Africa at the Olympics
