= Figure skating at the 1960 Winter Olympics – Pair skating =

Pair skating at the VIII Olympic Winter Games
- Venue: Blyth Arena; Squaw Valley, California, United States
- Dates: 19 February 1960
- Competitors: 26 from 7 nations

Medalists
1st place, gold medalist(s)		Barbara Wagner; Robert Paul	Canada
2nd place, silver medalist(s)		Marika Kilius; Hans-Jürgen Bäumler	United Team of Germany
3rd place, bronze medalist(s)		Nancy Ludington; Ronald Ludington	United States

The pair skating competition of the 1960 Winter Olympics was held at the Blyth Arena in Squaw Valley, California, United States. The event took place on Friday 19 February 1960. Each judge ranked the skaters by Ordinal Placement from first to last place. If a skater was ranked first by a majority of the judges, that skater was placed first overall; this process was repeated for each place. If more than one skater had a majority ranking for the same position, then a series of tiebreaks were in place, indicated in order in the Results section below.

Barbara Wagner / Robert Paul won gold for Canada, having not been beaten since the 1956 Winter Olympics.

== Results ==
Pl.	Name	Nation	MP	TOOM	TO	TP
1	Barbara Wagner / Robert Paul	Canada	7x1+	7.0	7.0	80.4
2	Marika Kilius / Hans-Jürgen Bäumler	United Team of Germany	4x2+	8.0	19.0	76.8
3	Nancy Ludington / Ronald Ludington	United States	4x3+	11.0	27.5	76.2
4	Maria Jelinek / Otto Jelinek	Canada	6x4+	19.0	26.0	75.9
5	Margret Göbl / Franz Ningel	United Team of Germany	5x5+	20.0	36.0	72.5
6	Nina Zhuk / Stanislav Zhuk	Soviet Union	5x5+	25.0	38.0	72.3
7	Rita Blumenberg / Werner Mensching	United Team of Germany	4x7+	26.5	53.0	70.2
8	Diana Hinko / Heinz Döpfl	Austria	5x8+	35.5	54.5	69.8
9	Liudmila Belousova / Oleg Protopopov	Soviet Union	4x9+	30.0	60.5	68.6
10	Maribel Owen / Dudley Richards	United States	5x10+	46.0	69.0	67.5
11	Ila Ray Hadley / Ray Hadley	United States	4x11+	41.0	78.0	65.7
12	Jacqueline Mason / Mervyn Bower	Australia	5x12+	57.0	83.0	63.7
13	Marcelle Matthews / Gwyn Jones	South Africa	7x13+	85.5	85.5	63.6

Referee:

- Walter S. Powell

Assistant Referee:

- Alexander D.C. Gordon

Judges:

- (Australia) Sydney R. Croll
- (Austria) Franz Wojtanowskyj
- (Canada) John Greig
- (West Germany) Theo Klemm
- (Italy) Giovanni de Mori
- (Switzerland) Emile Finsterwald
- (United States) Howell Janes
