= South Africa at the 2006 Winter Paralympics =

- IPC code: RSA
- NPC: South African Sports Confederation and Olympic Committee
- Website: www.sascoc.co.za

in Turin
- Competitors: 1 in 1 sport
- Medals Ranked 20th: Gold 0 Silver 0 Bronze 0 Total 0

Winter Paralympics appearances (overview)
- 1998; 2002; 2006; 2010; 2014–2026

South Africa participated in the ninth Winter Paralympics in Turin, Italy. The team consisted of a single athlete, alpine skier Bruce Warner. Warner did not win any medals.

== See also ==
- 2006 Winter Paralympics
- South Africa at the 2006 Winter Olympics
