= South Africa at the 2010 Winter Paralympics =

- IPC code: RSA
- NPC: South African Sports Confederation and Olympic Committee
- Website: www.sascoc.co.za

in Vancouver
- Competitors: 1 in 1 sport
- Flag bearer: David Warner
- Medals: Gold 0 Silver 0 Bronze 0 Total 0

Winter Paralympics appearances (overview)
- 1998; 2002; 2006; 2010; 2014–2026

South Africa competed at the 2010 Winter Paralympics in Vancouver, British Columbia, Canada. The appearance marked the nation's fourth appearance at a Winter Paralympics since its debut at the 1998 Games; to athlete has won any medals. As with the previous four occasions, the country's only representative at the 2010 Paralympics was alpine skier Bruce Warner. He acted as the flag bearer in the Parade of Nations during the opening ceremony. Warner competed in four standing skiing events, but did not place on the medal podiums.

== Background ==
South Africa made its Winter Paralympics debut at the 1998 Games in Nagano, Japan. It was the second nation from Africa to take at a Winter Paralympics, after the appearances of Uganda at the 1976 and 1980 Games. On both occasions, Uganda was represented by Tofiri Kibuuka, who was the first African competitor at a Winter Paralympics. When South Africa debuted in 1998, their sole competitor, Bruce Warner, became the second African to compete at a Winter Paralympics. He would continue to compete for the nation for the following four Winter Paralympics, until the 2010 Games.

== Alpine skiing ==
The sole South African athlete at the 2010 Winter Paralympics, Bruce Warner, competed in five standing alpine skiing events. He also acted as the nation's flag bearer in the Parade of Nations during the opening ceremony. The skiing events for the games took place in Whistler, Canada, but suffered from delays due to poor weather.

In the single run of the men's downhill standing, Warner recorded a time of one minute and 34.82 seconds. This placed him last overall in a field of 25 competitors who completed the race, although there were three skiers who failed to finish the course. A larger field competed in the slalom standing, where Warner finished in 32nd position with a combined time of two minutes and 6.25 seconds just ahead of Michael Klos of Poland (two minutes and 8.25 seconds) and behind Canada's Matt Hallatt (two minutes and 4.2 seconds).

He finished 31st overall from a field of 40 skiers who completed their runs in the giant slalom standing with a time of two minutes and 52.09 seconds. However, in the super-G standing, he finished near the back of the field again in 32nd position out of the 33 skiers with a time of one minute and 38.52 seconds. His final competition, the super combined standing, had a smaller field once again with only 21 skiers taking part. Warner finished last of those who completed the course, in 18th position with an overall time of two minutes and 34.3 seconds.

Skiing events

Athlete	Event	Run 1 (SG)		Run 2 (Sl)		Final/Total		
Athlete	Event	Time	Rank	Time	Rank	Time	Diff	Rank
Bruce Warner	Downhill standing	N/A				1:34.82	+14.02	25
Bruce Warner	Slalom standing	1:04.44	36	1:01.81	31	2:06.25	+20.85	32
Bruce Warner	Giant slalom standing	1:26.04	32			2:52.09		31
Bruce Warner	Super G standing	N/A				1:38.52	+18.51	32
Bruce Warner	Super combined standing	1:37.92	18	56.38	15	2:34.30	+22.46	18

Key

- Note–Ranks given for skiing events are an overall placement based on all competitors
- Diff - The difference between the individual athlete's time and the overall winner's time
- N/A = Round not applicable for the event

== See also ==
- South Africa at the Paralympics
- South Africa at the 2010 Winter Olympics
- South Africa at the 2006 Winter Paralympics
