= Alpine skiing at the 2010 Winter Olympics – Men's giant slalom =

Men's giant slalom at the XXI Olympic Winter Games
- Alpine skiing
- Venue: Whistler Creekside; Whistler, British Columbia; Canada
- Date: February 23, 2010
- Competitors: 103 from 60 nations
- Winning time: 2:37.83

Medalists
1st place, gold medalist(s)		Carlo Janka	Switzerland
2nd place, silver medalist(s)		Kjetil Jansrud	Norway
3rd place, bronze medalist(s)		Aksel Lund Svindal	Norway

The men's giant slalom competition of the Vancouver 2010 Olympics was held at Whistler Creekside in Whistler, British Columbia. Originally scheduled for February 21, it was rescheduled to February 23, due to delays of preceding alpine events.

Carlo Janka of Switzerland won the gold, with Kjetil Jansrud of Norway taking the silver medal. Fellow countryman Aksel Lund Svindal won the bronze, his third medal at the 2010 Winter Olympics.

== Results ==
Rank	Bib	Name	Country	Run 1	Rank	Run 2	Rank	Total	Diff.
1st place, gold medalist(s)	6	Carlo Janka	Switzerland	1:17.27	1	1:20.56	3	2:37.83	
2nd place, silver medalist(s)	4	Kjetil Jansrud	Norway	1:18.07	11	1:20.15	1	2:38.22	+0.39
3rd place, bronze medalist(s)	14	Aksel Lund Svindal	Norway	1:17.43	3	1:21.01	8	2:38.44	+0.61
4	1	Marcel Hirscher	Austria	1:17.48	5	1:21.04	9	2:38.52	+0.69
5	8	Romed Baumann	Austria	1:17.29	2	1:21.51	20	2:38.80	+0.97
6	5	Benjamin Raich	Austria	1:17.66	6	1:21.17	12	2:38.83	+1.00
7	16	Ivica Kostelić	Croatia	1:18.05	10	1:20.83	6	2:38.88	+1.05
8	33	Felix Neureuther	Germany	1:18.24	13	1:20.82	5	2:39.06	+1.23
9	7	Ted Ligety	United States	1:17.87	8	1:21.24	15	2:39.11	+1.28
10	25	Aleš Gorza	Slovenia	1:17.95	9	1:21.26	17	2:39.21	+1.38
11	3	Massimiliano Blardone	Italy	1:17.47	4	1:21.88	24	2:39.35	+1.52
12	15	Philipp Schörghofer	Austria	1:18.37	14	1:21.00	7	2:39.37	+1.54
13	18	Steve Missillier	France	1:18.20	12	1:21.23	14	2:39.43	+1.60
14	2	Didier Cuche	Switzerland	1:18.75	21	1:20.70	4	2:39.45	+1.66
15	19	Sandro Viletta	Switzerland	1:18.37	14	1:21.17	12	2:39.54	+1.71
16	44	Erik Guay	Canada	1:19.38	29	1:20.25	2	2:39.63	+1.80
17	22	Ondřej Bank	Czech Republic	1:18.39	16	1:21.25	16	2:39.64	+1.81
18	10	Alexander Ploner	Italy	1:18.67	20	1:21.10	11	2:39.77	+1.94
19	35	Janez Jazbec	Slovenia	1:18.92	22	1:21.04	9	2:39.96	+2.13
19	9	Davide Simoncelli	Italy	1:18.52	17	1:21.44	19	2:39.96	+2.13
21	17	Truls Ove Karlsen	Norway	1:18.93	23	1:21.27	18	2:40.20	+2.37
22	13	Manfred Mölgg	Italy	1:18.94	24	1:21.57	21	2:40.51	+2.68
23	30	Kryštof Krýzl	Czech Republic	1:18.57	18	1:22.16	27	2:40.73	+2.90
24	26	Robbie Dixon	Canada	1:19.20	28	1:21.78	22	2:40.98	+3.15
25	41	Andrej Šporn	Slovenia	1:19.19	27	1:21.86	23	2:41.05	+3.22
26	29	Tommy Ford	United States	1:19.10	26	1:22.05	26	2:41.15	+3.32
27	20	Markus Larsson	Sweden	1:19.46	30	1:21.97	25	2:41.43	+3.60
28	24	Leif Kristian Haugen	Norway	1:19.58	32	1:22.10	28	2:41.78	+3.95
29	12	Marc Berthod	Switzerland	1:19.00	25	1:23.10	31	2:42.10	+4.27
30	37	Andreas Romar	Finland	1:19.79	33	1:22.52	30	2:42.31	+4.48
31	28	Jake Zamansky	United States	1:19.85	34	1:22.50	29	2:42.35	+4.52
32	40	Paul de la Cuesta	Spain	1:20.06	35	1:23.16	33	2:43.22	+5.39
33	59	Andrej Križaj	Slovenia	1:20.48	36	1:23.74	36	2:44.22	+6.39
34	38	Cristian Javier Simari Birkner	Argentina	1:20.87	39	1:23.76	37	2:44.63	+6.80
35	51	Patrick Biggs	Canada	1:21.71	44	1:23.12	32	2:44.83	+7.00
36	48	Andrew Noble	Great Britain	1:20.79	38	1:24.06	38	2:44.85	+7.02
37	49	Edward Drake	Great Britain	1:21.65	43	1:23.48	34	2:45.13	+7.30
38	52	Aleksandr Khoroshilov	Russia	1:21.28	41	1:24.08	39	2:45.36	+7.53
39	62	Filip Trejbal	Czech Republic	1:21.74	45	1:23.67	35	2:45.41	+7.58
40	45	Sergei Maitakov	Russia	1:21.13	40	1:24.53	42	2:45.66	+7.83
41	66	Natko Zrnčić-Dim	Croatia	1:21.84	46	1:24.17	40	2:46.01	+8.18
42	32	Brad Spence	Canada	1:20.61	37	1:25.63	47	2:46.24	+8.41
43	56	Björgvin Björgvinsson	Iceland	1:21.44	42	1:25.27	45	2:46.71	+8.88
44	53	Jaroslav Babušiak	Slovakia	1:22.22	50	1:24.90	43	2:47.12	+9.29
44	54	Christophe Roux	Moldova	1:22.70	51	1:24.42	41	2:47.12	+9.29
46	60	Iason Abramashvili	Georgia	1:21.85	47	1:25.38	36	2:47.23	+9.40
47	50	David Ryding	Great Britain	1:21.97	49	1:26.06	48	2:48.03	+10.20
48	65	Stefan Georgiev	Bulgaria	1:23.82	53	1:25.09	44	2:48.91	+11.08
49	68	Ioan-Gabriel Nan	Romania	1:23.86	54	1:26.15	49	2:50.01	+12.18
50	78	Jaba Gelashvili	Georgia	1:23.61	52	1:26.71	51	2:50.32	+12.49
51	81	Igor Zakurdaev	Kazakhstan	1:24.50	57	1:26.86	52	2:51.36	+13.53
52	55	Jorge Mandrú	Chile	1:24.96	60	1:26.59	50	2:51.55	+13.72
53	77	Antonio Ristevski	Macedonia	1:24.29	55	1:27.61	53	2:51.90	+14.07
54	69	Agustin Torres	Argentina	1:25.14	61	1:28.12	55	2:53.26	+15.43
55	73	Mykhaylo Renzhyn	Israel	1:25.77	62	1:28.04	54	2:53.81	+15.98
56	70	Jhonatan Longhi	Brazil	1:24.76	59	1:29.27	56	2:54.03	+16.20
57	71	Andrei Drygin	Tajikistan	1:25.82	63	1:29.47	57	2:55.29	+17.46
58	76	Marko Rudić	Bosnia and Herzegovina	1:26.85	66	1:29.51	58	2:56.36	+18.53
59	87	Vitalij Rumiancev	Lithuania	1:27.27	68	1:29.52	59	2:56.79	+18.96
60	67	Pouria Saveh-Shemshaki	Iran	1:26.44	65	1:31.26	63	2:57.70	+19.87
61	88	Bojan Kosić	Montenegro	1:27.74	70	1:30.29	60	2:58.03	+20.20
62	75	Kristaps Zvejnieks	Latvia	1:28.29	71	1:30.33	61	2:58.62	+20.79
63	90	Erjon Tola	Albania	1:27.57	69	1:31.70	65	2:59.27	+21.44
64	57	Stepan Zuev	Russia	1:26.32	64	1:33.41	68	2:59.73	+21.90
65	82	Stephanos Tsimikalis	Greece	1:29.21	73	1:30.95	62	3:00.16	+22.33
66	80	Deyvid Oprja	Estonia	1:29.27	74	1:31.51	64	3:00.78	+22.95
67	100	Manfred Oettl Reyes	Peru	1:29.56	76	1:32.49	66	3:02.05	+24.22
68	92	Rostyslav Feshchuk	Ukraine	1:29.79	77	1:32.74	67	3:02.53	+24.70
69	101	Dow Travers	Cayman Islands	1:29.39	75	1:33.50	69	3:02.89	+25.06
70	74	Hossein Saveh-Shemshaki	Iran	1:31.31	81	1:34.56	71	3:05.87	+28.04
71	79	Márton Bene	Hungary	1:31.08	80	1:34.89	73	3:05.97	+28.14
72	91	Jedrij Notz	Azerbaijan	1:30.78	79	1:35.20	74	3:05.98	+28.15
73	99	Leyti Seck	Senegal	1:32.32	85	1:33.82	70	3:06.14	+28.31
74	98	Samir Azzimani	Morocco	1:32.02	83	1:34.61	72	3:06.63	+28.80
75	89	Li Lei	China	1:30.36	78	1:36.90	76	3:07.26	+29.43
76	95	Dmitry Trelevski	Kyrgyzstan	1:31.61	82	1:36.40	75	3:08.01	+30.18
77	86	Oleg Shamaev	Uzbekistan	1:32.20	84	1:36.98	78	3:09.18	+31.35
78	103	Hubertus of Hohenlohe	Mexico	1:34.50	86	1:36.97	77	3:11.47	+33.64
79	96	Muhammad Abbas	Pakistan	1:38.27	87	1:42.31	79	3:20.58	+42.75
80	94	Marino Cardelli	San Marino	1:40.88	88	1:44.88	80	3:25.76	+47.93
81	102	Jamyang Namgial	India	1:46.77	89	1:48.15	81	3:34.92	+57.09
	21	Gauthier de Tessières	France	1:19.50	31	DNS			
	11	Cyprien Richard	France	1:17.86	7	DNF			
	27	Marcus Sandell	Finland	1:18.58	19	DNF			
	64	Roger Vidosa	Andorra	1:21.91	48	DNF			
	34	André Myhrer	Sweden	1:24.37	56	DNF			
	72	Vassilis Dimitriadis	Greece	1:24.64	58	DNF			
	85	Ghassan Achi	Lebanon	1:27.19	67	DNF			
	93	Christopher Papamichalopoulos	Cyprus	1:29.02	72	DNF			
	36	Hans Olsson	Sweden	DNS					
	47	Kilian Albrecht	Bulgaria	DNS					
	23	Thomas Mermillod-Blondin	France	DNF					
	31	Bode Miller	United States	DNF					
	39	Martin Vráblík	Czech Republic	DNF					
	42	Dalibor Samsal	Croatia	DNF					
	43	Ferran Terra	Spain	DNF					
	46	Benjamin Griffin	New Zealand	DNF					
	83	Erdinç Türksever	Turkey	DNF					
	84	Arsen Nersisyan	Armenia	DNF					
	97	Peter Scott	South Africa	DNF					
	58	Kim Woo-sung	South Korea	DSQ					
	61	Danko Marinelli	Croatia	DSQ					
	63	Markus Kilsgaard	Denmark	DSQ					
