= South Africa at the 1998 Winter Paralympics =

- IPC code: RSA
- NPC: South African Sports Confederation and Olympic Committee
- Website: www.sascoc.co.za

in Nagano
- Competitors: 1 in 1 sport
- Medals: Gold 0 Silver 0 Bronze 0 Total 0

Winter Paralympics appearances (overview)
- 1998; 2002; 2006; 2010; 2014–2026

South Africa made its Winter Paralympic Games début at the 1998 Winter Paralympics in Nagano, Japan. The country entered only one athlete, Bruce Warner, who competed in alpine skiing. He did not win any medals.

South Africa thus became the second African country ever to compete at the Winter Paralympics, following Uganda in 1976.

== Alpine skiing ==
Bruce Warner, South Africa's only representative, entered four events:

- In the Men's downhill LW2, he finished 25th (out of 30), with a calculated time of 1:19.25.
- In the Men's giant slalom LW2, he finished 19th (out of 37), with a calculated time of 3:08.90.
- In the Men's slalom LW2, he finished 20th (out of 38), with a calculated time of 2:21.57.
- In the Men's super-G LW2, he finished 21st (out of 34), with a calculated time of 1:25.61.
