= South Africa at the 2028 Summer Olympics =

- IOC code: RSA
- NOC: South African Sports Confederation and Olympic Committee
- Website: www.sascoc.co.za

in Los Angeles, United States 11 July 2028 – 30 July 2028
- Competitors: 15 in 1 sport
- Medals: Gold 0 Silver 0 Bronze 0 Total 0

Summer Olympics appearances (overview)
- 1904; 1908; 1912; 1920; 1924; 1928; 1932; 1936; 1948; 1952; 1956; 1960; 1964–1988; 1992; 1996; 2000; 2004; 2008; 2012; 2016; 2020; 2024; 2028

South Africa is scheduled to compete at the 2028 Summer Olympics in Los Angeles, from 14 to 30 July 2028. It will be the nation's tenth consecutive appearance at the Games in the post-apartheid era and twenty-first overall in Summer Olympic history.

== Competitors ==
The following is the list of number of competitors in the Games.

Sport	Men	Women	Total
Cricket	0	15	15
Total	0	15	15

== Cricket ==
=== Women's tournament ===
South Africa women's national cricket team qualified for the Olympics by finishing as the highest ranked Africa team at the 2026 Women's T20 World Cup, held in England and Wales.
