= South Africa at the 2024 Winter Youth Olympics =

- Flag of South Africa
- IOC code: RSA
- NOC: South African Sports Confederation and Olympic Committee

in Gangwon, South Korea 19 January 2024 – 1 February 2024
- Competitors: 1 in 1 sport
- Flag bearer (opening): Lara Markthaler
- Flag bearer (closing): TBD
- Medals: Gold 0 Silver 0 Bronze 0 Total 0

Winter Youth Olympics appearances
- 2012; 2016; 2020; 2024

South Africa competed at the 2024 Winter Youth Olympics in Gangwon, South Korea, from 19 January to 1 February 2024. This was South Africa's fourth appearance at the Winter Youth Olympic Games, having competed at every Games since the inaugural edition in 2012.

The South African team consisted of one female alpine skier. Alpine skier Lara Markthaler was the country's flagbearer during the opening ceremony.

== Competitors ==
The following is the list of number of competitors (per gender) participating at the games per sport/discipline.

Sport	Men	Women	Total
Alpine skiing	0	1	1
Total	0	1	1

== Alpine skiing ==
South Africa qualified one female alpine skier.

Women

Athlete	Event	Run 1		Run 2		Total	
Athlete	Event	Time	Rank	Time	Rank	Time	Rank
Lara Markthaler	Super-G	—N/a				57.13	33
Lara Markthaler	Giant slalom	DNF					
Lara Markthaler	Slalom	DNF					
Lara Markthaler	Combined	1:00.59	41	DNF			

== See also ==
- South Africa at the 2024 Summer Olympics
