= South Africa at the 2002 Winter Olympics =

- IOC code: RSA
- NOC: South African Sports Confederation and Olympic Committee
- Website: www.sascoc.co.za

in Salt Lake City
- Competitors: 1 (man) in 1 sport
- Flag bearer: Alexander Heath
- Medals: Gold 0 Silver 0 Bronze 0 Total 0

Winter Olympics appearances (overview)
- 1960; 1964–1992; 1994; 1998; 2002; 2006; 2010; 2014; 2018; 2022; 2026

South Africa sent a delegation to compete at the 2002 Winter Olympics in Salt Lake City, United States from 8–24 February 2002. This was South Africa's fourth time appearing at a Winter Olympic Games. The nation's delegation consisted of a single alpine skier, Alexander Heath. In his best performance, he finished 27th in the men's slalom.

== Background ==
South Africa first entered Olympic competition at the 1904 St. Louis Summer Olympics. They made their debut at a Winter Olympic Games in the 1960 Winter Olympics. From 1964 until 1991, South Africa was banned from the Olympics due to its practice of Apartheid. South Africa was reinstated by the International Olympic Committee in 1991 following the end of Apartheid. They returned to the Olympics for the 1992 Summer Olympics and the 1994 Winter Olympics. These Salt Lake City Olympics were their fourth ever appearance at a Winter Olympics. The 2002 Winter Olympics were held from 8–24 February 2002; a total of 2,399 athletes representing 77 National Olympic Committees took part. The South African delegation to Salt Lake City consisted of a single alpine skier, Alexander Heath. He was selected as the flag bearer for the opening ceremony.

== Alpine skiing ==
Heath was 23 years old at the time of the Salt Lake City Olympics. He was returning to the Olympics after representing South Africa at the 1998 Winter Olympics. On 10 February he participated in the downhill, finishing the race in a time of 1 minute and 48.84 seconds, which put him in 51st place out of 53 competitors who finished the contest. The gold medal was won by Fritz Strobl of Austria in a time of 1 minute and 39.13 seconds. On 13 February the combined was held; the competition consisted of one run of downhill and two runs of slalom, with the total time of all three legs determining the final positions. Heath finished the downhill portion of the combined in 1 minute and 47.27 seconds, but failed to finish the first of the two slalom runs.

Over a week later, on 21 February, he was part of the giant slalom, finishing his first run in 1 minute and 19.32 seconds. Heath was faster on his second run, finishing in 1 minute and 17.95 seconds. His total time was 2 minutes and 37.27 seconds, which put him in 48th position; the gold medal was won by Austria's Stephan Eberharter in 2 minutes and 23.28 seconds. His final event, on 23 February, was the slalom, where he finished his runs in 56.37 seconds and 1 minute and 0.56 seconds. His total time for the event was 1 minute and 56.93 seconds, which placed him 27th out of 33 classified finishers; the gold medalist was Jean-Pierre Vidal of France, who turned in a time of 1 minute and 41.06 seconds. Heath would later represent South Africa at the 2006 Winter Olympics.

Athlete	Event	Race 1	Race 2	Total	
Athlete	Event	Time	Time	Time	Rank
Alexander Heath	Downhill			1:48.84	51
Alexander Heath	Giant slalom	1:19.32	1:17.95	2:37.27	48
Alexander Heath	Slalom	56.37	1:00.56	1:56.93	27

Men's combined

Athlete	Downhill	Slalom		Total	
Athlete	Time	Time 1	Time 2	Total time	Rank
Alexander Heath	1:47.27	DNF	–	DNF	–

== See also ==
- South Africa at the 2002 Winter Paralympics
