= South Africa at the 2006 Winter Olympics =

- IOC code: RSA
- NOC: South African Sports Confederation and Olympic Committee
- Website: www.sascoc.co.za

in Turin
- Competitors: 3 (3 men) in 3 sports
- Flag bearers: Alexander Heath (opening); Tyler Botha (closing)
- Medals: Gold 0 Silver 0 Bronze 0 Total 0

Winter Olympics appearances (overview)
- 1960; 1964–1992; 1994; 1998; 2002; 2006; 2010; 2014; 2018; 2022; 2026

Three men from South Africa competed at the 2006 Winter Olympics in Turin, Italy. One of them, Alexander Heath, became the first African to compete in all 5 alpine events. The three-man South African team was the largest from the continent in Turin.

== Alpine skiing ==
Alexander Heath, competing in his third Olympics, qualified in all five events, with his best finish a 27th in the giant slalom.

Athlete	Event	Final				
Athlete	Event	Run 1	Run 2	Run 3	Total	Rank
Alexander Heath	Men's downhill	n/a			1:59.79	52
Alexander Heath	Men's super-G	n/a			1:37.77	50
Alexander Heath	Men's giant slalom	1:25.61	1:25.81	n/a	2:51.42	27
Alexander Heath	Men's slalom	did not finish				
Alexander Heath	Men's combined	1:47.62	did not finish			

Note: In the men's combined, run 1 is the downhill, and runs 2 and 3 are the slalom. In the women's combined, run 1 and 2 are the slalom, and run 3 the downhill.

== Cross-country skiing ==
Kraas competed in three events in Turin, but finished in only one, the sprint, where he finished 57th out of 80 competitors.

Distance

Athlete	Event	Final	
Athlete	Event	Total	Rank
Oliver Kraas	Men's 15 km classical	Did not finish	
Oliver Kraas	Men's 50 km freestyle	Did not finish	

Sprint

Athlete	Event	Qualifying		Quarterfinal		Semifinal		Final	
Athlete	Event	Total	Rank	Total	Rank	Total	Rank	Total	Rank
Oliver Kraas	Men's sprint	2:27.68	57	Did not finish					57

== Skeleton ==
Tyler Botha finished second in a pair of Challenge Cup events that allowed him to qualify for the Games, where he ended up in 21st place.

Athlete	Event	Final			
Athlete	Event	Run 1	Run 2	Total	Rank
Tyler Botha	Men's	59.43	1:00.63	2:00.06	21
