= South Africa at the 2010 Winter Olympics =

- IOC code: RSA
- NOC: South African Sports Confederation and Olympic Committee
- Website: www.sascoc.co.za

in Vancouver
- Competitors: 2 in 2 sports
- Flag bearer: Oliver Kraas
- Medals: Gold 0 Silver 0 Bronze 0 Total 0

Winter Olympics appearances (overview)
- 1960; 1964–1992; 1994; 1998; 2002; 2006; 2010; 2014; 2018; 2022; 2026

South Africa sent a delegation to compete at the 2010 Winter Olympics in Vancouver, British Columbia, Canada from 12–28 February 2010. The South African team consisted of two athletes in two sports: alpine skier Peter Scott and cross-country skier Oliver Kraas. Neither of the South African athletes won a medal.

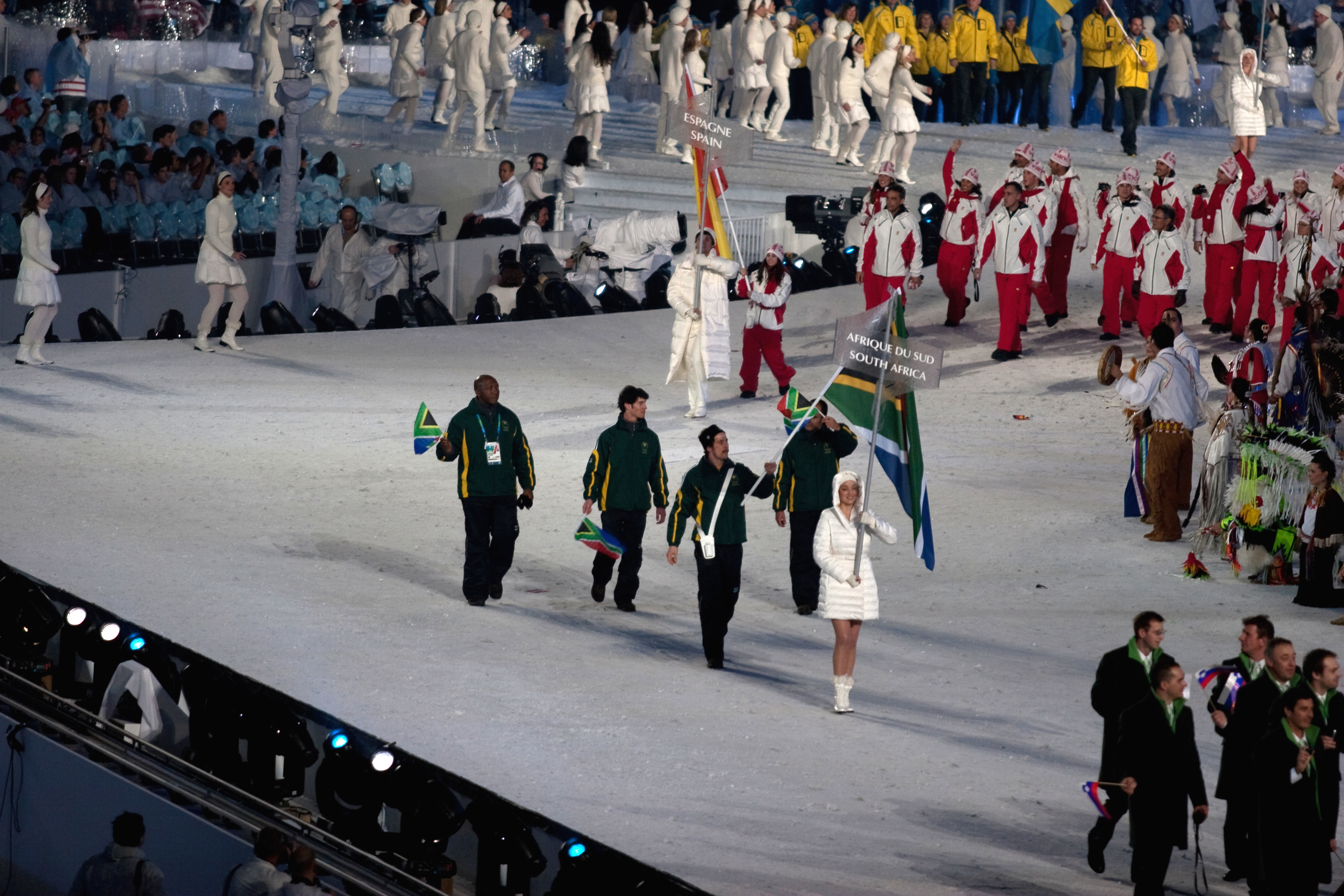
The athletes entering the stadium during the opening ceremonies.

== Background ==
South Africa first entered Olympic competition at the 1904 St. Louis Summer Olympics. They made their debut at a Winter Olympic Games in the 1960 Winter Olympics. From 1964 until 1991, South Africa was banned from the Olympics due to its practice of Apartheid. South Africa was reinstated by the International Olympic Committee in 1991 following the end of Apartheid. They returned to the Olympics for the 1992 Summer Olympics and the 1994 Winter Olympics. The nation competed in every Winter Olympics from 1994 to these Vancouver Olympics in 2010. The South African team consisted of two athletes; alpine skier Peter Scott and cross-country skier Oliver Kraas. Krass was chosen as the flag bearer for the opening ceremony, while Alex Heath, a team coach, was chosen for the closing ceremony.

== Alpine skiing ==
South Africa qualified one entrant in alpine skiing. That entrant, Peter Scott, was 19 years old at the time of the Vancouver Olympics. In the men's giant slalom, held on 23 February, he failed to finish the first leg of the race. His failure to finish was caused by leaving the starting gate too early, and then attempting to walk back up a "few meters". Samir Azzimani, a fellow competitor, said Scott was disqualified, though the official records list him as a did not finish.

Athlete	Event	Run 1	Run 2	Total	Rank
Peter Scott	Men's giant slalom	DNF	did not advance		

== Cross-country skiing ==
South Africa qualified one entrant in cross-country skiing, Oliver Kraas, who was 34 at the time of the Games. In his event, the men's sprint, he posted a time of 4 minutes and 4 seconds in the qualifying round, which placed him in 61st position. As only the top 30 competitors advanced to the event's next stage, he was eliminated.

Athlete	Event	Qualifying		Quarterfinals		Semifinals		Final	
Athlete	Event	Time	Rank	Time	Rank	Time	Rank	Time	Rank
Oliver Kraas	Sprint	4:04.19	61	did not advance					
