= Peter Scott (skier) =

South African alpine skier (born 1990)

Personal information
- Born: November 27, 1990 Cape Town, South Africa
- Height: 1.78 m (5 ft 10 in)

Sport
- Sport: Skiing
- Updated on 19 February 2010

Peter Scott (born 27 November 1990) is an alpine skier from South Africa. He was part of the 2010 Winter Olympics team of South Africa, participating in the men's giant slalom competition. He trains at Peyragudes Ski Club in France.

Scott was born in Cape Town. His family moved to France when he was nine years old. There, he took up skiing, and his family later moved to Gazave, in the Pyrenees so he "could do more training and racing". He is coached by Alexander Heath.
