= Tsimikalis =

Tsimikalis is a surname. Notable people with the surname include:

- Stephanos Tsimikalis
- Efthymios Tsimikalis
- Athanasios Tsimikalis
