= South Africa at the 2020 Winter Youth Olympics =

South Africa in the Olympics

- IOC code: RSA
- NOC: South African Sports Confederation and Olympic Committee
- Website: www.sascoc.co.za

in Lausanne
- Competitors: 2 in 1 sport
- Flag bearer: Thabo Rateleki
- Medals: Gold 0 Silver 0 Bronze 0 Total 0

Winter Youth Olympics appearances
- 2012; 2016; 2020; 2024

South Africa competed at the 2020 Winter Youth Olympics in Lausanne, Switzerland from 9 to 22 January 2020.

South Africa's team consisted of two athletes (one male and one female) competing in alpine skiing. Thabo Rateleki served as the country's flag bearer during the opening ceremony.

== Alpine skiing ==
Athlete	Event	Run 1		Run 2		Total	
Athlete	Event	Time	Rank	Time	Rank	Time	Rank
Thabo Rateleki	Boys' giant slalom	1:30.63	59	DSQ			
Thabo Rateleki	Boys' slalom	54.08	51	1:05.82	40	1:59.90	39
Hanle van der Merwe	Girls' giant slalom	1:34.18	54	DNS			
Hanle van der Merwe	Girls' slalom	1:17.60	47	1:17.48	37	2:35.08	37

== See also ==
- South Africa at the 2020 Summer Olympics
