= South Africa at the 2012 Winter Youth Olympics =

- IOC code: RSA
- NOC: South African Sports Confederation and Olympic Committee

in Innsbruck
- Competitors: 1 in 1 sport
- Flag bearer: Sive Speelman
- Medals: Gold 0 Silver 0 Bronze 0 Total 0

Winter Youth Olympics appearances
- 2012; 2016; 2020; 2024

South Africa competed at the 2012 Winter Youth Olympics in Innsbruck, Austria. The South African team was made up of one athlete and two officials. Chantelle Jardim was the Chef De Mission of the team.

The athlete selected became the first black athlete to represent the country at any Winter Olympics.

== Alpine skiing ==
South Africa has qualified one boy in alpine skiing.

Boy

Athlete	Event	Final			
Athlete	Event	Run 1	Run 2	Total	Rank
Sive Speelman	Slalom	53.13	52.04	1:45.17	32
Sive Speelman	Giant slalom	1:08.96	1:03.25	2:12.21	35
Sive Speelman	Super-G			1:18.31	41
Sive Speelman	Combined	1:18.22	58.10	2:16.32	33

== See also ==
- South Africa at the 2012 Summer Olympics
