= South Africa at the 2002 Winter Paralympics =

- IPC code: RSA
- NPC: South African Sports Confederation and Olympic Committee
- Website: www.sascoc.co.za

in Salt Lake City
- Competitors: 1
- Medals: Gold 0 Silver 0 Bronze 0 Total 0

Winter Paralympics appearances (overview)
- 1998; 2002; 2006; 2010; 2014–2026

South Africa competed at the 2002 Winter Paralympics in Salt Lake City, United States. One competitor from South Africa won no medals and so did not place in the medal table.

== See also ==
- South Africa at the Paralympics
- South Africa at the 2002 Winter Olympics
