= South Africa at the 2026 Winter Olympics =

- Flag of South Africa
- IOC code: RSA
- NOC: South African Sports Confederation and Olympic Committee
- Website: www.sascoc.co.za

in Milan and Cortina d'Ampezzo, Italy 6 February 2026 – 22 February 2026
- Competitors: 5 (2 men and 3 women) in 4 sports
- Flag bearers (opening): Matthew Smith & Nicole Burger
- Flag bearer (closing): Thomas Weir
- Medals: Gold 0 Silver 0 Bronze 0 Total 0

Winter Olympics appearances (overview)
- 1960; 1964–1992; 1994; 1998; 2002; 2006; 2010; 2014; 2018; 2022; 2026

South Africa competed at the 2026 Winter Olympics in Milan and Cortina d'Ampezzo, Italy, from 6 to 22 February 2026. The 2026 games were its first participation in the Winter Olympics since 2018 after missing the 2022 games.

Cross-country skier Matthew Smith and skeleton athlete Nicole Burger were the country's flagbearer during the opening ceremony. Meanwhile, Thomas Weir was the country's flagbearer during the closing ceremony.

== Competitors ==
The following is the list of number of competitors participating at the Games per sport/discipline.

Sport	Men	Women	Total
Alpine skiing	1	1	2
Cross-country skiing	1	0	1
Freestyle skiing	0	1	1
Skeleton	0	1	1
Total	2	3	5

== Alpine skiing ==
South Africa qualified one female and one male alpine skier through the basic quota.

Athlete	Event	Run 1		Run 2		Total	
Athlete	Event	Time	Rank	Time	Rank	Time	Rank
Thomas Weir	Men's giant slalom	1:29.55	68	1:22.48	62	2:52.03	63
Thomas Weir	Men's slalom	DNF					
Lara Markthaler	Women's giant slalom	1:12.17	51	1:19.29	48	2:31.46	47
Lara Markthaler	Women's slalom	52.72	46	56.95	40	1:49.67	39

== Cross-country skiing ==
South Africa qualified one male cross-country skier through the basic quota. 34-year-old Matt Smith qualified to represent the country in the sport. Smith had only taken up the sport two years ago after moving from South Africa to Norway. This will mark the country's first participation in the sport in 16 years, after last competing at the 2010 Winter Olympics.

Athlete	Event	Final		
Athlete	Event	Time	Deficit	Rank
Matthew Smith	Men's 10 km freestyle	30:04.4	+9:28.2	108

== Freestyle skiing ==
South Africa qualified a female athlete in moguls and dual moguls through the World Cup and 2025 World Championship event.

Moguls

Athlete	Event	Qualification								Final							
Athlete	Event	Run 1				Run 2				Run 1				Run 2			Rank
Athlete	Event	Time	Points	Total	Rank	Time	Points	Total	Rank	Time	Points	Total	Rank	Time	Points	Total	Rank
Malica Malherbe	Women's moguls	30.39	43.58	55.85	25	30.05	46.19	58.86	17	Did not advance							

Dual moguls

Athlete	Event	Round of 32	Round of 16	Quarterfinal	Semifinal	Final	
Athlete	Event	Opposition Result	Opposition Result	Opposition Result	Opposition Result	Opposition Result	Rank
Malica Malherbe	Women's dual moguls	Anthony (AUS); L DNF-35	Did not advance				

== Skeleton ==
South Africa qualified a single female skeleton racer, securing one quota spot based on the IBSF Ranking List for the 2025–26 season.

Athlete	Event	Run 1		Run 2		Run 3		Run 4		Total	
Athlete	Event	Time	Rank	Time	Rank	Time	Rank	Time	Rank	Time	Rank
Nicole Burger	Women's	59.63	25	59.43	25	1:00.06	25	58.98	24	3:58.10	25
