= Connor Wilson =

South African alpine skier

Personal information
- National team: South Africa
- Born: 18 December 1996 (age 29) Johannesburg, South Africa
- Height: 175 cm (5 ft 9 in)
- Weight: 70 kg (154 lb)

Sport
- Country: South Africa
- Sport: Alpine skiing
- Rank: 54th (giant slalom); 71st (slalom)
- Coached by: Cedric Maret & Grant Stockman

Achievements and titles
- Olympic finals: 2018 Pyeongchang

Connor Wilson (born in Johannesburg, South Africa, on 18 December 1996) is a South African alpine skier. He was the sole athlete competing for South Africa at the 2018 Winter Olympics.

== Biography ==
Wilson was born in Johannesburg, South Africa. He is an Active Club member. He is attending the University of Vermont in veterinary sciences. where he skis with Mount Mansfield Ski Club in Vermont. He trains at various locations but his main base is the Afriski Mountain Resort in Lesotho where he skis with Afriski Race Club.

Wilson started skiing at age five but started alpine racing at age 15 when he attended Eaglebrook School in the US for two years which had a race program. Once he returned to South Africa he was determined to carry on alpine ski racing and would drive six hours to Afriski Resort, Lesotho, first from Kwazulu Natal where he attended Kearsney College later from Johannesburg where he attended St. John's College. Wilson has been trained by Grant Stockman of Stockman Sports, New Zealand, and by Cedric Maret of Switzerland. In 2016/2017 he took a gap year and studied at the Carrabassett Valley Academy and trained at Sugarloaf Mountain in Maine.

Connor Wilson is an accomplished equestrian, a certified rescue scuba diver, and a helicopter pilot. He got provincial riding colors in both Kwazulu Natal and Gauteng and represented SA at the All Africa Mauritian Friendship cup in 2015. He received the gold President's (Duke of Edinburgh) Award in 2015 while attending St. John's College, Johannesburg.

== FIS tournaments ==
Wilson is the current South African National Slalom Champion. He won the South African National Alpine Ski Championships in 2016 and 2017. He was the South African National Junior Champion in 2014. Wilson competed at the annual FIS championships held in Tiffindell, South Africa and came in 16th at the CIT Arnold Lunn World Cup.

At the FIS World Ski Championships in St. Moritz, Switzerland, Wilson ranked 71st in the slalom finals and 54th at the giant slalom finals.

== 2018 Winter Olympics ==
On 1 February 2018, Wilson and three other South African athletes qualified to represent South Africa at the Olympics. Wilson the current South African slalom champion was chosen for South Africa's only slot in Alpine Skiing due to his superior FIS ranking, FIS points and also being the only South African athlete to have qualified for the Olympics in giant slalom. He was the flag bearer for South Africa at the 2018 Winter Olympics Parade of Nations.

He was accompanied by Peter Pilz and Sive Speelman and competed in the men's giant slalom and men's slalom tournaments.

Olympic Games
Preceded by Wayde van Niekerk	Flag bearer for South Africa; 2018 Pyeongchang	Succeeded by Phumelela Mbande; Chad le Clos
