= South Africa at the 2016 Winter Youth Olympics =

- IOC code: RSA
- NOC: South African Sports Confederation and Olympic Committee

in Lillehammer
- Competitors: 1 in 1 sport
- Medals: Gold 0 Silver 0 Bronze 0 Total 0

Winter Youth Olympics appearances
- 2012; 2016; 2020; 2024

South Africa was scheduled to compete at the 2016 Winter Youth Olympics in Lillehammer, Norway from 12 to 21 February 2016. The team consisted of one female athlete in alpine skiing.

== Competitors ==
Sport	Men	Women	Total
Alpine skiing		1	1
Total		1	1

== Alpine skiing ==
South Africa had qualified one girl.

Girls

Athlete	Event	Run 1		Run 2		Total	
Athlete	Event	Time	Rank	Time	Rank	Time	Rank
Rachel Olivier	Slalom	1:15.00	37	1:09.12	31	2:24.12	31
Rachel Olivier	Giant slalom	1:46.60	42	1:42.07	36	3:28.67	36

== See also ==
- South Africa at the 2016 Summer Olympics
