= Apartheid-era South Africa and the Olympics =

Olympics with respect to South Africa during apartheid-era

South Africa did not compete at Olympic Games from 1964 to 1988, as a part of the sporting boycott of South Africa during the apartheid era. The South African National Olympic Committee (NOC) was expelled from the International Olympic Committee (IOC) in 1970. As part of the transition to racial integration in the early 1990s, South Africa was re-admitted to the IOC in 1991, and competed at the 1992 Summer Olympics held in Barcelona.

== Background ==
All sport in South Africa under apartheid was segregated by race, with separate clubs and governing bodies. Only white bodies were affiliated to the South African Olympic and Empire [later Commonwealth] Games Association (SAOEGA, later SAOCGA) so only white South Africans competed at the Olympic Games and the Empire (later Commonwealth) Games. The IOC under Avery Brundage regarded this as an internal matter for South Africa, and, committed to keeping politics and sports separate, took no action. From 1948, black athletes and their federations complained to the IOC about their exclusion, but were told to take the matter up with the SAOCGA.

In the 1950s, NOCs from the Eastern Bloc led by the Soviet Union began to question this stance. With the decolonisation of Africa from the late 1950s, NOCs from newly independent states opposed to apartheid began affiliating to the IOC. However, the IOC itself was not representative of NOCs but rather a group of co-opted individuals, still mostly from First World countries. On the other hand, the international federations (IFs), the governing bodies of the Olympic sports, were quicker to give a voice to newer members.

== 1957–60 ==
In 1957, the SAOCGA prohibited mixed-race competitions within its member bodies. In 1959, Dennis Brutus and others founded the South African Sports Association (SASA), which campaigned to allow non-white athletes to represent South Africa. The same year, IOC delegates questioned whether SAOCGA's operation violated the Olympic Charter's ban on discrimination. Reginald Honey, South Africa's IOC member, contended that nonwhite competitors had not been selected because none were of Olympic standard, and promised that any selected in future would be given passports. Brundage felt the discrimination rule only applied at the Olympics itself, not at domestic competition, and so South Africa was allowed to compete at the 1960 Olympics in Rome. The same year, it competed at the Winter Olympics for the first time. Its delegations were all white.

== 1961–64 ==
South Africa's isolation increased in 1960–61 when it declared a republic and left the Commonwealth. SAOCGA was renamed SAONGA (the South African Olympic and National Games Association) as it was no longer eligible for the Commonwealth Games; it was later more usually called SANOC (South Africa National Olympic Committee). In 1962, Jan de Klerk announced a ban on South Africans appearing in mixed-race competition inside or outside the country. In 1963, Dennis Brutus founded the South African Non-Racial Olympic Committee (SANROC) which lobbied the IOC to expel SAONGA. Brutus was subjected to travel restrictions and forbidden from attending meetings, so he fled to London. The IOC moved its 1963 conference from Nairobi to Baden-Baden after the Kenyan government refused to grant a visa to the South African delegate. To bypass its own ban on mixed-race competition, SANOC was prepared to stage its Olympic trials abroad, but the events would still be segregated. The IOC voted to revoke SANOC's invitation to the 1964 Summer Olympics unless it declared its opposition to the government's policy. SANOC did not do so and was excluded from the Games, although it remained affiliated to the IOC.

== 1965–68 ==
In 1965, SANROC was banned by the South African government, and Dennis Brutus re-established it in exile in London. In 1966, the Organisation of African Unity established the Supreme Council for Sport in Africa (SCSA), which committed itself to expelling South Africa from the Olympics and to boycott the Games if South Africa was present. The Association of National Olympic Committees of Africa (ANOCA) allowed SANROC to affiliate in place of SANOC. (Brundage later made SANROC change "Olympic" to "Open" in its name.) At the 1967 IOC conference in Tehran, SANOC committed to sending a single mixed-race team to the 1968 Summer Olympics in Mexico City. Separate racial committees would nominate athletes for each race to the combined team. Members from different races could compete against each other at the Games, though not in South Africa. The IOC deferred decision till its meeting at the 1968 Winter Olympics in Grenoble. In September 1967, a three-member IOC commission visited South Africa, reporting back in January 1968. It was led by Lord Killanin, a future IOC president, who resigned from the Irish Anti-Apartheid Society to forestall allegations of bias; the other members were Ade Ademola, a black Nigerian, and Reginald Alexander, a white Kenyan. Killanin later recalled that Ademola was repeatedly snubbed in South Africa, and that of whites they interviewed, athletes favoured integrated competition, administrators less so, and politicians Frank Waring and John Vorster not at all. To Killanin's surprise, a postal ballot of IOC members decided in February that SANOC had made sufficient progress in to be invited to the 1968 Games, on the understanding that its team would be multiracial and remaining discrimination would be ended by the 1972 Games. This verdict prompted the SCSA countries to withdraw; in the US, the American Committee on Africa organised a boycott by African American athletes; the Eastern Bloc also threatened a boycott. The Mexican organising committee was worried that its Games would be a fiasco and asked the IOC to reconsider. Brundage flew to South Africa in an unsuccessful bid to ask it to withdraw voluntarily. The IOC executive board met on 21 April 1968 to seek a diplomatic formula under which to exclude South Africa, finally agreeing that "due to the international climate, the executive committee was of the opinion it would be most unwise for South Africa to participate".

== 1969–70 ==
In response to its exclusion from the 1968 Games, SANOC organised a multi-sport tournament called the South African Open Games in February 1969, to which foreign white athletes were invited. A team from West Germany withdrew after the SCSA said its members would otherwise boycott the 1972 Summer Olympics in Munich. The IOC felt that expelling a member required a greater degree of due process than mere exclusion from the Games. At its 1969 conference it appointed a committee to investigate and produce specific charges of violation of the Olympic Charter. The committee's report at the 1970 conference in Amsterdam detailed seven allegations of discrimination, as well as the unauthorised use of the Olympic rings at the South African Open Games. IOC members voted to expel SANOC, by 35 to 28, with 3 abstentions. The conference coincided with a cancelled South African cricket tour of England and the banning of South Africa from the Davis Cup. Reginald Honey stated his intention to resign from the IOC, but because he personally opposed SANOC's policies, SCSA president Abraham Ordia persuaded him to remain a member until his death in 1982.

== 1971–88 ==
South Africa was the indirect cause of the 1976 Olympic boycott. A New Zealand rugby union tour of South Africa prompted African countries to demand that the New Zealand Olympic team be excluded from the games. The IOC demurred on the grounds that rugby union was not an Olympic sport and the New Zealand Rugby Union was not affiliated to the New Zealand Olympic Committee. Of 28 African invitees, 26 boycotted the Games, joined by Iraq and Guyana.

South Africa continued to compete at the (Summer) Paralympics until excluded by the Dutch government from the 1980 Games. The country had a racially desegregated parasport team from 1975. South Africa was expelled from the International Paralympic Committee in 1985.

The IOC adopted a declaration against "apartheid in sport" on 21 June 1988, for the total isolation of apartheid sport.

== Return to competition ==
In 1988, the IOC formed the Apartheid and Olympism Commission, including Kevan Gosper, the SCSA, and SANROC. While SANOC agreed it could not seek readmission to the IOC until apartheid was dismantled, negotiations to prepare the way for South Africa's reintegration into world sport proceeded in tandem with the political negotiations to end apartheid. Within South Africa, in each sport there were competing race-specific and multi-racial bodies, which would have to merge into one in order to affiliate into both a nonracial NOC and the IF for its sport. ANOCA took the lead in negotiations in 1990 and 1991, and an Interim National Olympic Committee of South Africa (INOCSA) was formed with Sam Ramsamy as president. Ramsamy had been a leading anti-apartheid campaigner and advocate of sports boycotts.

In June 1991, the Population Registration Act, 1950, a cornerstone of apartheid legislation, was repealed by the government of F. W. de Klerk, and in July an INOCSA delegation met with the Apartheid and Olympism Commission at the IOC headquarters in Lausanne. The IOC recognised INOCSA on 9 July 1991, such that the "interim" was removed from its name (NOCSA). It first competed at the 1992 Summer Olympics in Barcelona. The official flag of South Africa and national anthem "Die Stem van Suid-Afrika" were still the apartheid-era ones, but the Olympic team competed under an interim flag and Ludwig van Beethoven's "Ode to Joy". Likewise it decided not to use the Springbok emblem or green-and-gold colours of white sports teams. These decisions were unpopular with white South Africans, and as a concession the green-and-gold colours were adopted. NOCSA in 2004 merged with other bodies to form the South African Sports Confederation and Olympic Committee (SASCOC).

== See also ==
- Rhodesia at the Olympics

== Sources ==
- Espy, Richard (1981). The Politics of the Olympic Games: With an Epilogue, 1976–1980. University of California Press. ISBN 9780520043954.
- Honey, Andrew (2000). "South Africa and the Olympic Movement" (PDF). In K.B. Wamsley; S.G. Martyn; G. H. MacDonald; R.K. Barney (eds.). Bridging Three Centuries: Intellectual Crossroads and the Modern Olympic Movement. International Symposium for Olympic Research. pp. 177–184.
- Killanin, Michael Morris, Lord (1983). "V: South Africa". My Olympic Years. New York: Morrow. pp. 33–45. ISBN 978-0-688-02209-9 – via Internet Archive.
- Ramsamy, Sam (1991). "Apartheid and Olympism: on the Abolishment of Institutionalized Discrimination in International Sport". In Fernand Landry; Marc Landry; Magdeleine Yerlès (eds.). Sport, the Third Millennium: Proceedings of the International Symposium, Quebec City, Canada, May 21-25, 1990. Presses Université Laval. pp. 539–548. ISBN 9782763772677.
