= Phumelela Mbande =

South African field hockey player

Phumelela Hlophe (née Mbande)
Personal information
- Born: 8 March 1993 (age 33) Umtata, South Africa
- Height: 1.63 m (5 ft 4 in)
- Weight: 68 kg (150 lb)

Sport
- Sport: Field hockey
- Position: Goalkeeper
Senior career
Years	Team	Caps	Goals
2017-2019	Northern Blues	-	-
2021-present	KZN Coastals	-	-
2017-2019	Blyde River Bunters	-	-
National team
Years	Team	Caps	Goals
2013	South Africa U21	6	(0)
2013-present	South Africa	57	(0)
Medal record
Africa Cup of Nations
Gold medal – first place	2013 Nairobi
Gold medal – first place	2017 Ismailia
Gold medal – first place	2022 Accra

Phumelela Luphumlo Mbande (born 8 March 1993) is a South African field hockey player for the South African national team.

== International career ==
She participated at the 2018 Women's Hockey World Cup.

She captained the South African women's hockey team while she competed at the 2020 Summer Olympics. On 23 July 2021, Mbande shared the honour of serving as a flag bearer for South Africa, alongside swimmer player Chad le Clos, at the Parade of Nations during the opening ceremony of the 2020 Summer Olympics in Tokyo, Japan.

== Personal life ==
She studied a Bcom Accounting sciences degree and a post graduate diploma in accounting at the university of Pretoria, graduating in 2016. She qualified as a chartered accountant (South Africa) in 2019 and is an external audit manager at PricewaterhouseCoopers.

In September 2022, she married Malusi Hlophe.

Olympic Games
Preceded by Connor Wilson	Flagbearer for South Africa; Tokyo 2020 with Chad le Clos	Succeeded by Caitlin Rooskrantz; Akani Simbine
