= South Africa at the 2018 Winter Olympics =

- Flag of South Africa
- IOC code: RSA
- NOC: South African Sports Confederation and Olympic Committee
- Website: www.sascoc.co.za

in Pyeongchang, South Korea 9–25 February 2018
- Competitors: 1 in 1 sport
- Flag bearer: Connor Wilson
- Medals: Gold 0 Silver 0 Bronze 0 Total 0

Winter Olympics appearances (overview)
- 1960; 1964–1992; 1994; 1998; 2002; 2006; 2010; 2014; 2018; 2022; 2026

South Africa competed at the 2018 Winter Olympics in Pyeongchang, South Korea, from 9 to 25 February 2018. The country's participation in Pyeongchang marked its seventh appearance in the Winter Olympics.

South Africa was represented by a lone athlete Connor Wilson, who served as the country's flag-bearer during the opening and closing ceremony. South Africa did not win any medals in the Games.

== Background ==
South Africa competed in the 1904 Summer Olympics as Cape Colony, and as South Africa from the 1912 Summer Olympics. The nation made its Winter Olympics debut in 1960 Games. However, the nation was suspended from competing in the games due to the practice of apartheid. The South African Sports Confederation and Olympic Committee was re-admitted by the International Olympic Committee in 1992. The nation made its first Winter Olympics appearance post the same at the 1994 Winter Olympics. The current edition marked its seventh appearance at the Winter Games.

The 2018 Winter Olympics were held in Pyeongchang, South Korea between 9 and 25 February 2018. South Africa was represented by a lone athlete. Connor Wilson served as the country's flag-bearer during the opening, and closing ceremony. He did not win a medal.

== Competitors ==
South Africa was represented by a lone athlete alpine skier Connor Wilson.

Sport	Men	Women	Total
Alpine skiing	1	0	1
Total	1	0	1

== Alpine skiing ==
South Africa qualified one male athlete.

Wilson was born in Johannesburg and trained in Afriski Mountain Resort in Lesotho. He trained during the youth years in the United States, before having stints in New Zealand and Switzerland.

The Alpine skiing events were held at the Jeongseon Alpine Centre in Bukpyeong. The course for the events was designed by former Olympic champion Bernhard Russi. The weather was cold and windy during the events, and it was the coldest since the 1994 Winter Olympics at Lillehammer. Wilson did not record a finish in men's giant slalom and men's slalom events.

Athlete	Event	Run 1		Run 2		Total	
Athlete	Event	Time	Rank	Time	Rank	Time	Rank
Connor Wilson	Men's giant slalom	DNF					
Connor Wilson	Men's slalom	DNF					

== See also ==
- South Africa at the 2018 Summer Youth Olympics
