= South Africa at the Paralympics =

- IPC code: RSA
- NPC: South African Sports Confederation and Olympic Committee
- Website: www.sascoc.co.za
- Medals Ranked 18th: Gold 121 Silver 95 Bronze 88 Total 304

Summer appearances
- 1964; 1968; 1972; 1976; 1980–1988; 1992; 1996; 2000; 2004; 2008; 2012; 2016; 2020; 2024

Winter appearances
- 1998; 2002; 2006; 2010; 2014–2026

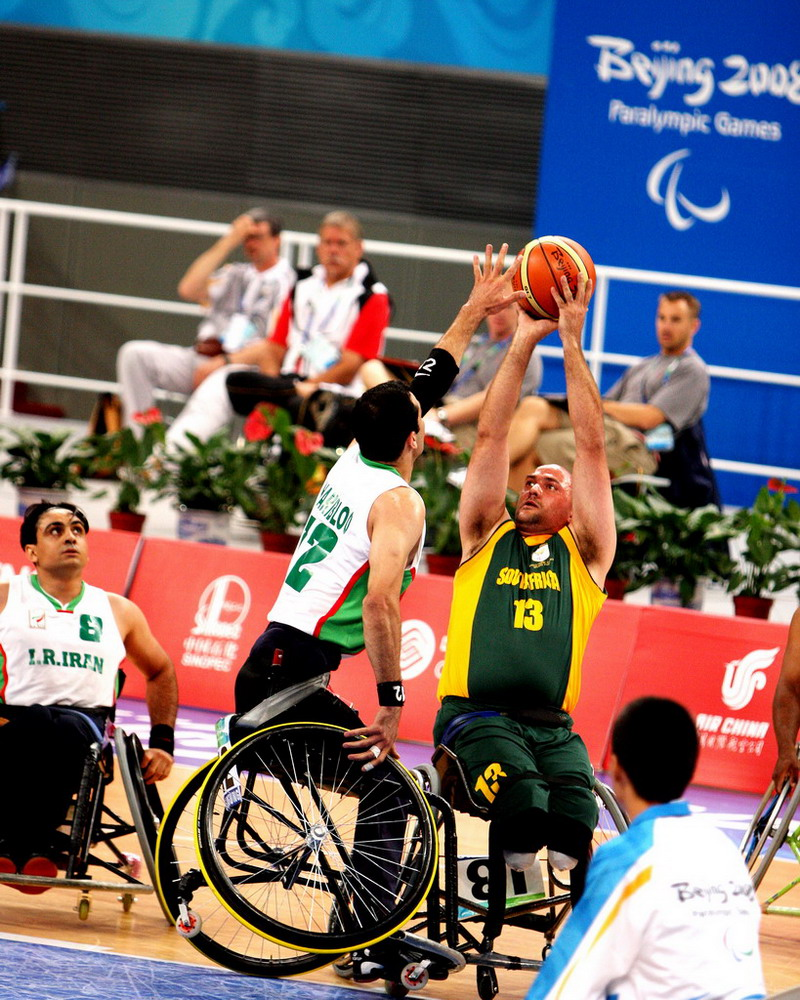
Wheelchair basketball at the 2008 Summer Paralympics between South Africa and Iran.

South Africa has competed at both the Summer and Winter Paralympic Games.

The country made its Paralympic début at the 1964 Summer Games in Tokyo, Japan, where it sent nine athletes to compete in archery, athletics, swimming and weightlifting. They finished sixth on the medal table with nineteen medals, of which eight gold. Paradoxically, South Africa thus began to compete at the Paralympics just after being barred from competing at the Olympics. South Africa had been banned from the Olympic Games following the passing of United Nations General Assembly Resolution 1761 which, in 1962, condemned the country's policy of apartheid. South Africa was not, however, banned from the Paralympics, and was therefore present at the 1964 Paralympics despite being absent from the 1964 Summer Olympics.

The country continued to compete at the Summer Paralympics until 1976, included.

The States-General (national Parliament) of the Netherlands, the host country of the 1980 Summer Paralympics, adopted a motion declaring South Africa's participation in the 1980 Games "undesirable". South Africa was subsequently absent from the Paralympic Games until 1992, at which point it also made its return to the Olympics, in the context of the dismantling of apartheid. It has competed at the Summer Games ever since.

South Africa made its Winter Paralympics début at the 1998 Games in Nagano, Japan. It thus became the second African country to compete at the Winter Paralympics, following Uganda in 1976. South Africa has competed at every edition of the Winter Paralympics since then. To date, only one athlete, alpine skier Bruce Warner, has represented South Africa at the Winter Games. He has yet to win a medal.

== Medal tables ==
=== Medals by Summer Games ===
Games	Gold	Silver	Bronze	Total
1964 Tokyo	8	8	3	19
1968 Tel Aviv	9	10	7	26
1972 Heidelberg	16	12	13	41
1976 Toronto	6	9	11	26
1992 Barcelona	4	1	3	8
1996 Atlanta	10	8	10	28
2000 Sydney	13	12	13	38
2004 Athens	15	13	7	35
2008 Beijing	21	3	6	30
2012 London	8	12	9	29
2016 Rio de Janeiro	7	6	4	17
2020 Tokyo	4	1	2	7
2024 Paris	2	0	4	6
Totals (13 entries)	123	95	92	310

=== Medals by Winter Games ===
Games	Gold	Silver	Bronze	Total
1998 Nagano	0	0	0	0
2002 Salt Lake City	0	0	0	0
2006 Turin	0	0	0	0
2010 Vancouver	0	0	0	0
Totals (4 entries)	0	0	0	0

== Multi-medalists ==
South African athletes who have won at least three gold medals or five or more medals of any colour.

No.	Athlete	Sport	Years	Games	Gender	Gold	Silver	Bronze	Total
1	Natalie du Toit	Swimming	2004-2012	3	F	13	2	0	15
2	Fanie Lombaard	Athletics	2000-2008	3	M	6	2	1	9
3	Oscar Pistorius	Athletics	2004-2012	3	M	6	1	1	8
4	Daniel Erasmus	Athletics	1964-1972	3	M	5	6	1	12
5	Hilton Langenhoven	Athletics	2004-2016	4	M	4	2	0	6
6	Malcolm Pringle	Athletics	1996-2004	3	M	3	3	1	7
7	Ebert Kleynhans	Swimming	1996-2004	3	M	3	1	0	4
8	Michael Louwrens	Swimming	1996-2008	4	M	3	0	1	4
8	Fanie van der Merwe	Athletics	2008-2016	3	M	3	0	1	4
10	Ilse Hayes	Athletics	2004-2016	4	F	2	4	1	7
11	Ernst van Dyk	Athletics; Cycling	2000-2016	5	M	2	3	3	8
12	Tadhg Slattery	Swimming	1992-2012	6	M	2	3	1	6

== See also ==
- South Africa at the Olympics
