= Marion Sage =

South African figure skater

Personal information
- Full name: Marion Sage
- Born: 26 March 1943 (age 83) Cape Town

Figure skating career
- Country: South Africa

Marion "Penny" Sage (born 26 March 1943 in Cape Town) is a South African figure skater. She represented South Africa at the 1960 Winter Olympics where she placed 23rd.
