= South Africa at the 1936 Summer Olympics =

- IOC code: RSA (ZAF used at these Games)
- NOC: South African Olympic and Empire Games Association

in Berlin
- Competitors: 32 (27 men, 5 women) in 6 sports
- Flag bearer: Clarke Scholtz
- Medals Ranked 25th: Gold 0 Silver 1 Bronze 0 Total 1

Summer Olympics appearances (overview)
- 1904; 1908; 1912; 1920; 1924; 1928; 1932; 1936; 1948; 1952; 1956; 1960; 1964–1988; 1992; 1996; 2000; 2004; 2008; 2012; 2016; 2020; 2024

The Union of South Africa competed at the 1936 Summer Olympics in Berlin, Germany. 32 competitors, 27 men and 5 women, took part in 26 events in 6 sports.

== Medalists ==
=== Silver ===
- Charles Catterall – Boxing, Men's Featherweight

== Athletics ==
Hurdler Sid Kiel, the holder of the South African record for the 110 metres hurdles, was selected in the South African delegation but boycotted to protest the antisemitism of the German government.

== Cycling ==
Two cyclists, both men, represented South Africa in 1936.

Individual road race

- Hennie Binneman
- Ted Clayton

Sprint

- Ted Clayton

Time trial

- Ted Clayton

== Rowing ==
South Africa had one rower participate in one out of seven rowing events in 1936.

Men's single sculls

- Walter Youell
