= Atlanta Figure Skating Club =

The Atlanta Figure Skating Club (AFSC) was founded in 1956 (69 years ago) and became a member club of US Figure Skating in 1958. It is the oldest figure skating club in Georgia and one of the largest figure skating clubs in the United States.

Annually the AFSC hosts the Magnolia Open and the Atlanta Open.

The AFSC hosted the 1976, 1985, 2000, and 2015 South Atlantic Regional Championships, the 1980 and 2004 National Championships, and the 2006 Eastern Sectional Championships.

In October 1992, the AFSC hosted Skate America International at the Omni arena.

== Skaters who have represented the club ==
- Alexander Aiken
- Brittney McConn Bottoms
- Allen Davis
- Timothy Dolensky
- Jackie Farrell
- Brad Griffies
- Todd Hansen
- Kaysi Kitsell
- Alice Qiao
- Jabe Roberts
- Leslie Sikes
- Laura Steele
- Colin Vander Veen
- Valory Vennes
- Debbie Walls
- Elizabeth Wright-Johnson

== Notable coaches and judges ==
Barbara Wagner, Olympic Gold Medalist and four-time Worlds' Champion in Pairs Skating coaches at The Cooler, the primary skating rink of the Atlanta figure skating club, as well as Herbert Wiesinger German Figure Skating Championships, three time Gold Medalist in German Figure Skating Championships.
