= Matthew Smith (cross-country skier) =

South African cross-country skier (born 1990)

Personal information
- Citizenship: South Africa
- Born: 16 November 1990 (age 35) Cape Town, South Africa

Sport
- Sport: Cross-country skiing

Matthew C. Smith (born 16 November 1990) is a South African cross-country skier.

== Biography ==
Smith qualified to represent South Africa in the 10km freestyle cross-country skiing event at the 2026 Winter Olympics. He had only taken up the sport in 2023 after moving from Cape Town to Oslo, where he was trained by Ole Ensrud and Mexican skier Allan Corona. This marked the country's first participation in the sport in 16 years, after last competing at the 2010 Winter Olympics.
