= Nicole Burger =

South African skeleton racer (born 1994)

Personal information
- Nationality: South African
- Born: 11 May 1994 (age 32) Bellville, South Africa

Sport
- Country: South Africa
- Sport: Skeleton

Nicole Burger (born 11 May 1994) is a South African skeleton racer.

== Biography ==
Burger moved to the United Kingdom as a child, initially taking up athletics, rugby, and the heptathlon. She joined the Royal Air Force in 2019, later began skeleton racing as it was a sport offered by the military. She competed in her first international event in the Europe Cup in Bludenz in December 2023.

She qualified to represent South Africa in the skeleton racing event at the 2026 Winter Olympics, and was the country's flag bearer.
