= Robert Paul (figure skater) =

Canadian pair skater (1937–2024)

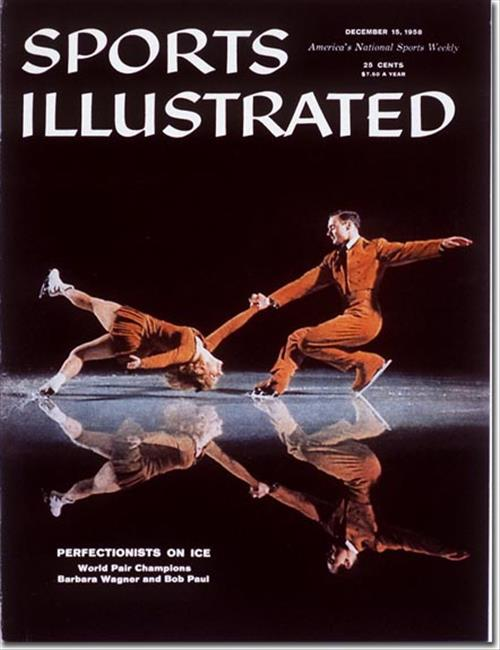
- Paul with Barbara Wagner

Personal information
- Born: June 2, 1937 Toronto, Ontario, Canada
- Died: December 19, 2024 (aged 87) Minneapolis, Minnesota, U.S.

Figure skating career
- Country: Canada
- Retired: 1960
Medal record
Representing Canada
Pairs' figure skating
Olympic Games
Gold medal – first place	1960 Squaw Valley	Pairs
World Championships
Gold medal – first place	1960 Vancouver	Pairs
Gold medal – first place	1959 Colorado Springs	Pairs
Gold medal – first place	1958 Paris	Pairs
Gold medal – first place	1957 Colorado Springs	Pairs
North American Championships
Gold medal – first place	1959 Toronto	Pairs
Gold medal – first place	1957 Rochester	Pairs
Bronze medal – third place	1955 Regina	Pairs

Robert Paul (June 2, 1937 – December 19, 2024) was a Canadian pair skater. He teamed up with Barbara Wagner in 1952. They became the 1960 Olympic champions, four-time World champions, and five-time Canadian national champions. After retiring from competition, the pair toured with Ice Capades.

== Biography ==
Paul choreographed for Peggy Fleming, Dorothy Hamill, Linda Fratianne, and Donny and Marie. He was one of Mirai Nagasu's coaches. He appeared in the Bewitched episode "Samantha on Thin Ice".

Paul starred in the first full-length television skating special in Canada, "Planet Ice".

Paul died in Minneapolis, Minnesota on December 19, 2024, at the age of 87.

== Results ==
(with Wagner)

International
Event	1953	1954	1955	1956	1957	1958	1959	1960
Winter Olympics				6th				1st
World Championships			5th	5th	1st	1st	1st	1st
North American Championships			3rd		1st		1st	
National
Canadian Championships	3rd J	1st J	2nd	1st	1st	1st	1st	1st

(Men's singles)

National
Event	1955	1956
Canadian Championships	2nd J	2nd J
