= South Africa at the 1994 Winter Olympics =

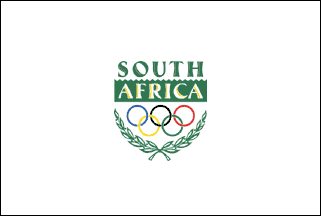
- Flag of Olympic Committee of South Africa, used at the 1994 Winter Games
- IOC code: RSA
- NOC: South African Sports Confederation and Olympic Committee
- Website: www.sascoc.co.za

in Lillehammer
- Competitors: 2 in 2 sports
- Flag bearer: Dino Quattrocecere
- Medals: Gold 0 Silver 0 Bronze 0 Total 0

Winter Olympics appearances (overview)
- 1960; 1964–1992; 1994; 1998; 2002; 2006; 2010; 2014; 2018; 2022; 2026

South Africa competed at the 1994 Winter Olympics in Lillehammer, Norway. These were the first Winter Olympic games South Africa competed in since the 1960 Winter Olympics at Squaw Valley, United States.

== Flag, anthem and team logo ==
As the design for a new post-apartheid flag had yet to be finalised, the team used a white banner charged with the emblem of Olympic Committee of South Africa, which depicted Olympic rings surrounded by olive branches, with the name of the country above.

== Competitors ==
The following is the list of number of competitors in the Games.

Sport	Men	Women	Total
Figure skating	1	0	1
Short track speed skating	0	1	1
Total	1	1	2

== Figure skating ==
Men

Athlete	Final				
Athlete	Short Program	Rank	Free Skating	Total	Rank
Dino Quattrocecere	11.5	23	24.0	35.5	24

== Short track speed skating ==
Women

Athlete	Event	Heats		Quarterfinals		Semifinals		Final	
Athlete	Event	Time	Rank	Time	Rank	Time	Rank	Time	Rank
Cindy Meyer	500 m	1:17.18	4	did not advance					
Cindy Meyer	1000 m	1:47.85	3	did not advance					
