= Barbara Wagner =

Canadian figure skater

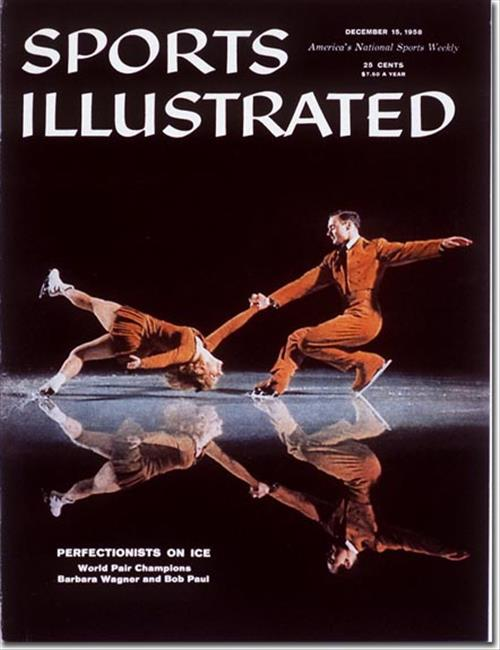
- Wagner with Bob Paul

Personal information
- Full name: Barbara Aileen Wagner
- Born: May 5, 1938 (age 88) Toronto, Ontario, Canada

Figure skating career
- Country: Canada
- Retired: 1960
Medal record
Representing Canada
Pairs' figure skating
Olympic Games
Gold medal – first place	1960 Squaw Valley	Pairs
World Championships
Gold medal – first place	1960 Vancouver	Pairs
Gold medal – first place	1959 Colorado Springs	Pairs
Gold medal – first place	1958 Paris	Pairs
Gold medal – first place	1957 Colorado Springs	Pairs
North American Championships
Gold medal – first place	1959 Toronto	Pairs
Gold medal – first place	1957 Rochester	Pairs
Bronze medal – third place	1955 Regina	Pairs

Barbara Aileen Wagner (born May 5, 1938) is a Canadian former pair skater. She teamed up with Robert Paul in 1952. They became the 1960 Olympic champions, four-time World champions, and five-time Canadian national champions. After retiring from competition, the pair toured with Ice Capades.

Wagner was formerly married to U.S. figure skater James Grogan. She resides in Alpharetta, Georgia, coaching figure skating at the Alpharetta Family Skate Center, the Cooler, and is a member of the Atlanta Figure Skating Club.

== Results ==
(with Paul)

International
Event	1953	1954	1955	1956	1957	1958	1959	1960
Winter Olympics				6th				1st
World Championships			5th	5th	1st	1st	1st	1st
North American Championships			3rd		1st		1st	
National
Canadian Championships	3rd J	1st J	2nd	1st	1st	1st	1st	1st
