= South Africa at the 1998 Winter Olympics =

- IOC code: RSA
- NOC: South African Sports Confederation and Olympic Committee
- Website: www.sascoc.co.za

in Nagano
- Competitors: 2 (1 man, 1 woman) in 2 sports
- Flag bearer: Shirene Human (figure skating)
- Medals: Gold 0 Silver 0 Bronze 0 Total 0

Winter Olympics appearances (overview)
- 1960; 1964–1992; 1994; 1998; 2002; 2006; 2010; 2014; 2018; 2022; 2026

South Africa competed at the 1998 Winter Olympics in Nagano, Japan.

== Competitors ==
The following is the list of number of competitors in the Games.

Sport	Men	Women	Total
Alpine skiing	1	0	1
Figure skating	0	1	1
Total	1	1	2

== Alpine skiing ==
Men

Athlete	Event	Race 1	Race 2	Total	
Athlete	Event	Time	Time	Time	Rank
Alexander Heath	Super-G			DNF	–
Alexander Heath	Slalom	1:06.82	1:07.62	2:14.44	26

== Figure skating ==
Women

Athlete	SP	FS	TFP	Rank
Shirene Human	23	24	35.5	24
