= Marcelle Matthews =

South African figure skater

Personal information
- Full name: Marcelle Matthews
- Born: 19 April 1948 (age 78)

Figure skating career
- Country: South Africa
- Partner: Gwyn Jones

Marcelle Matthews (born 19 April 1948) is a South African pair skater. With partner Gwyn Jones, she represented South Africa at the 1960 Winter Olympics where she placed 13th. She was 11 years old at the time.
