= Janez Jazbec =

Slovenian alpine skier (born 1984)

Janez Jazbec (born December 27, 1984, in Kranj) is a Slovenian alpine skier.

Jazbec represented Slovenia at the 2010 Winter Olympics.
