= Jake Zamansky (skier) =

American alpine skier (born 1981)

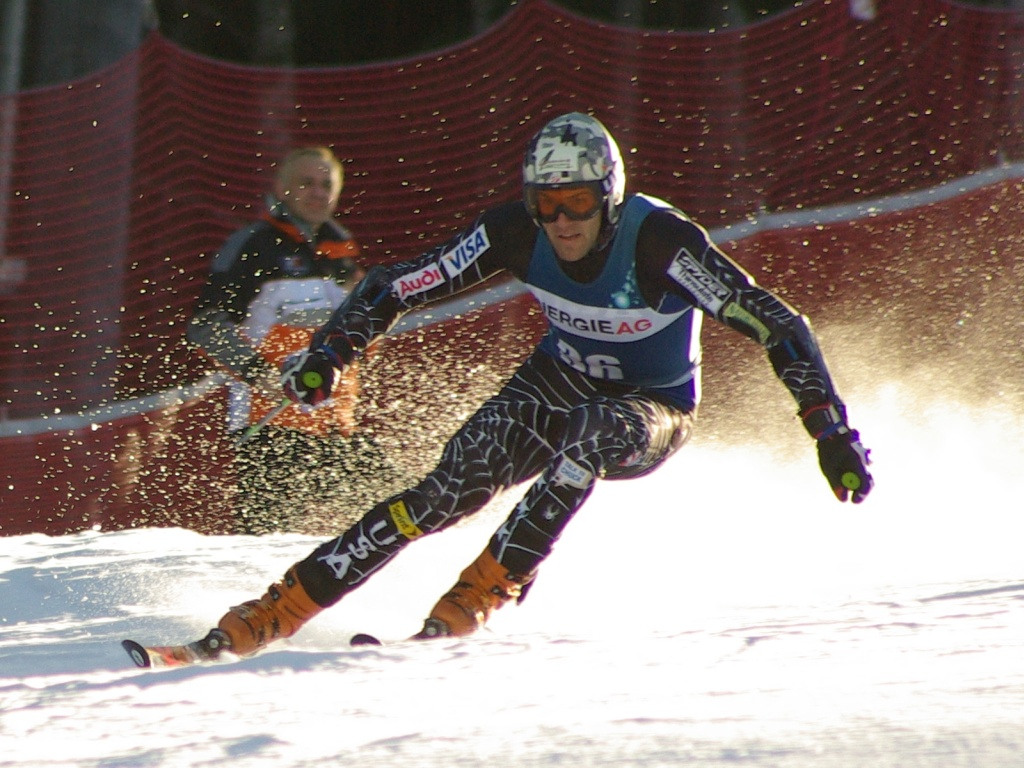
Jake Zamansky in January 2008

Jake Zamansky (born June 26, 1981) is an American alpine ski racer who has competed since 1997. His best World Cup finish was 15th at a giant slalom event in Italy in 2009.

At the FIS Alpine World Ski Championships 2009 in Val d'Isère, Zamansky did not finish the giant slalom event.

He was named to the US Olympic Team for the 2010 Winter Olympics in late 2009.
