= South Africa at the Olympics =

- IOC code: RSA
- NOC: South African Sports Confederation and Olympic Committee
- Website: www.sascoc.co.za
- Medals Ranked 37th: Gold 28 Silver 36 Bronze 31 Total 95

Summer appearances
- 1904; 1908; 1912; 1920; 1924; 1928; 1932; 1936; 1948; 1952; 1956; 1960; 1964–1988; 1992; 1996; 2000; 2004; 2008; 2012; 2016; 2020; 2024; 2028

Winter appearances
- 1960; 1964–1992; 1994; 1998; 2002; 2006; 2010; 2014; 2018; 2022; 2026

South Africa first participated at the Olympic Games in 1904, and sent athletes to compete in every Summer Olympic Games until 1960. After the passage of United Nations General Assembly Resolution 1761 in 1962 in response to South Africa's policy of racial segregation, known as apartheid, the nation was barred from the Games. After the negotiations to end apartheid in South Africa commenced in 1990, the nation re-joined the Olympic movement. The South African Sports Confederation and Olympic Committee was created in 1991, and South Africa returned to the Games at the 1992 Summer Olympics (and the 1992 Summer Paralympics). South Africa also participated in the Winter Olympic Games in 1960, and since 1994. South African athletes have won a total of 95 medals, with athletics, boxing and swimming as the top medal-producing sports.

== Timeline of participation ==
Olympic Year/s	Teams	
1904–1908	South Africa (ZAF)	
1912–1924	South Africa (ZAF)	
1928–1956	South Africa (ZAF)	
1960	South Africa (SAF)	
1964–1992 W		
1992 S	South Africa	Namibia
1994	South Africa	Namibia
1996–present	South Africa	Namibia

== History ==
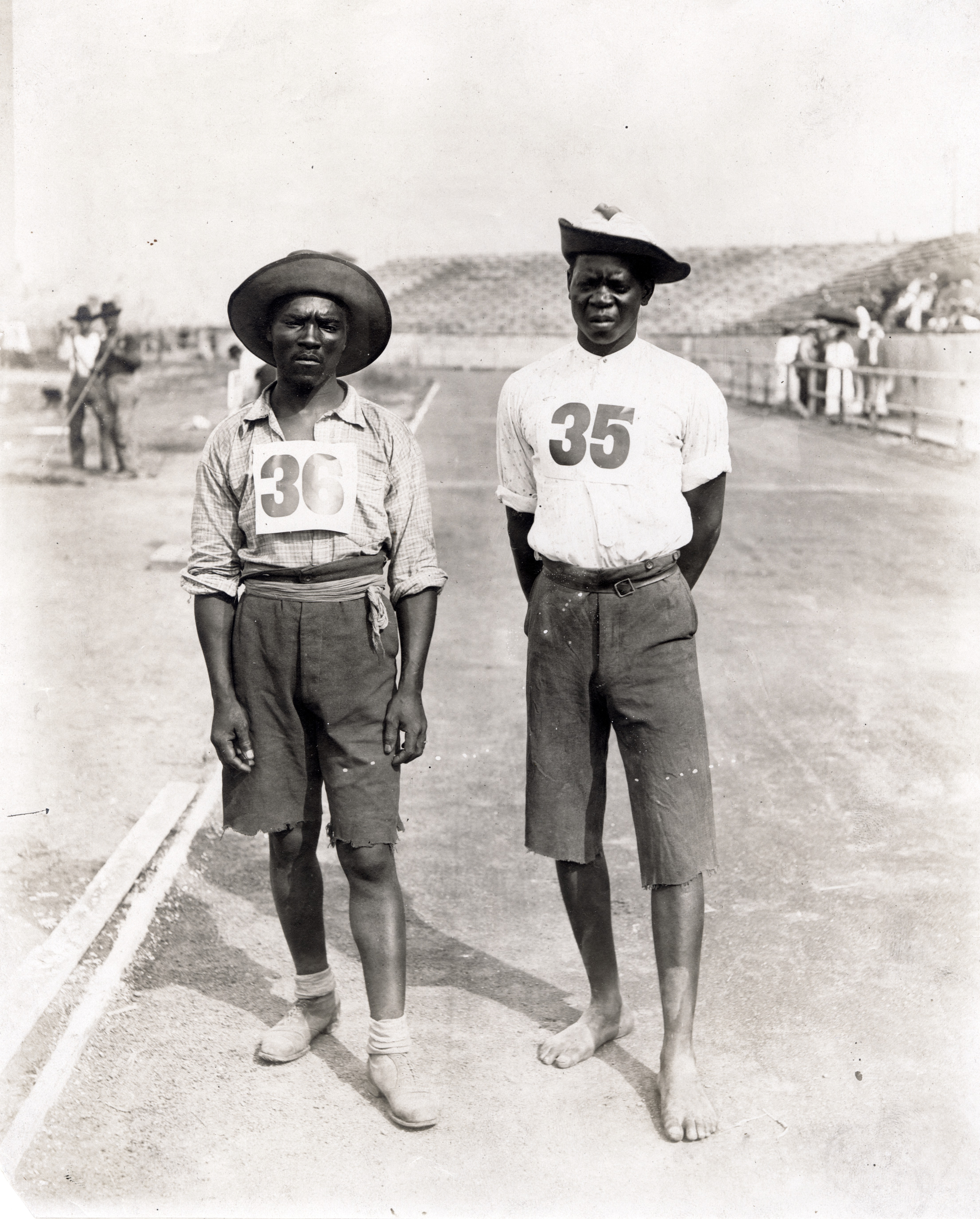
Mashiani (left) and Tau before the race

South African athletes first participated in the 1904 Summer Olympics in St. Louis, when few foreign athletes arrived and the organisers invited participants of the adjacent 1904 World's Fair to compete. General Piet Cronjé, Len Taunyane and Jan Mashiani, all Boer War veterans who had been taken prisoner by the British at St. Helena after the Battle of Paardeberg and had reenacted battle scenes at the fair, participated in the men's marathon. Len Taunyane and Jan Mashiani were the first black people to participate in the Olympics, and the only black people to represent South Africa in the Olympics until the end of apartheid.

Although the four British colonies of Cape of Good Hope, Natal, Transvaal and Orange River did not form the Union of South Africa until 1910, they fielded a combined South Africa team at the 1908 Summer Olympics in London, where Reggie Walker won its first gold medal. The first South African woman in the Olympics was swimmer Barbara Nash in 1920, and the first women to win medals were the 1928 4 × 100 metre freestyle relay quartet, who came third. The South African Olympic and Empire Games Association was awarded the 1934 British Empire Games in Johannesburg but backed out when it became evident that they would have to allow a team from India to compete.

South Africa first entered the Winter Olympics in 1960, and that summer's games in Rome would be its last till the end of apartheid. It was not invited to the 1964 Games, and its 1968 invitation was withdrawn when other teams threatened to withdraw. The South African Olympic and National Games Association was expelled from the International Olympic Committee (IOC) in 1970.

The non-racial Interim National Olympic Committee of South Africa (now South African Sports Confederation and Olympic Committee) was founded in 1991 during the transition to racial equality and affiliated to the IOC months later. The country returned at the 1992 Summer Olympics in Barcelona.

== Medal tables ==
=== Medals by Summer Games ===
Games	Athletes	Gold	Silver	Bronze	Total	Rank
(United States) 1904 St. Louis	8	0	0	0	0	–
(United Kingdom) 1908 London	14	1	1	0	2	14
(Sweden) 1912 Stockholm	21	4	2	0	6	7
(Belgium) 1920 Antwerp	39	3	4	3	10	11
(French Third Republic) 1924 Paris	30	1	1	1	3	18
(Netherlands) 1928 Amsterdam	24	1	0	2	3	23
(United States) 1932 Los Angeles	12	2	0	3	5	15
(Nazi Germany) 1936 Berlin	32	0	1	0	1	25
(United Kingdom) 1948 London ^{[Art]}	35	2	1	1	4	18
(Finland) 1952 Helsinki	64	2	4	4	10	12
(Australia) 1956 Melbourne	50	0	0	4	4	33
(Italy) 1960 Rome	55	0	1	2	3	28
1964–1988	excluded					
(Spain) 1992 Barcelona	93	0	2	0	2	41
(United States) 1996 Atlanta	84	3	1	1	5	27
(Australia) 2000 Sydney	127	0	2	3	5	55
(Greece) 2004 Athens	106	1	3	2	6	43
(China) 2008 Beijing	136	0	1	0	1	70
(United Kingdom) 2012 London	125	4	1	1	6	20
(Brazil) 2016 Rio de Janeiro	138	2	6	2	10	30
(Japan) 2020 Tokyo	177	1	2	0	3	52
(France) 2024 Paris	149	1	3	2	6	44
(United States) 2028 Los Angeles	future event					
(Australia) 2032 Brisbane	future event					
Total (21/30)	1,519	28	36	31	95	37

- ^{Art comp.} Art competitions (1912–1948) are not included in the medal table above, as they were non-sports events formerly part of the Olympic Games. (Note: In 1952, art competition medals, as well as the gold medal awards for feats in alpinism and aeronautics, were removed from the official national medal counts. Only since 2021 have they been officially listed again by the IOC in the medal tables and respective NOC profile on its website. South Africa won a total of two art competition medals (1 silver, and 1 bronze), both at the 1948 Summer Olympics.) South Africa won a total of two art competition medals (1 silver, and 1 bronze), both at the 1948 Summer Olympics.

=== Medals by Winter Games ===
Games	Athletes	Gold	Silver	Bronze	Total	Rank
(United States) 1960 Squaw Valley	4	0	0	0	0	–
1964–1988	excluded					
(France) 1992 Albertville	did not participate					
(Norway) 1994 Lillehammer	2	0	0	0	0	–
(Japan) 1998 Nagano	2	0	0	0	0	–
(United States) 2002 Salt Lake City	1	0	0	0	0	–
(Italy) 2006 Turin	3	0	0	0	0	–
(Canada) 2010 Vancouver	2	0	0	0	0	–
(Russia) 2014 Sochi	did not participate					
(South Korea) 2018 Pyeongchang	1	0	0	0	0	–
(China) 2022 Beijing	did not participate					
(Italy) 2026 Milano Cortina	5	0	0	0	0	–
(France) 2030 French Alps	future event					
(United States) 2034 Utah	future event					
Total (8/25)	20	0	0	0	0	–

=== Medals by summer sport ===
Sport	Gold	Silver	Bronze	Total
Athletics	9	15	6	30
Swimming	8	8	6	22
Boxing	6	4	9	19
Tennis	3	2	1	6
Cycling	1	4	4	9
Rowing	1	1	1	3
Shooting	0	1	0	1
Surfing	0	1	0	1
Rugby	0	0	2	2
Canoeing	0	0	1	1
Triathlon	0	0	1	1
Totals (11 entries)	28	36	31	95

== List of medalists ==
=== Medalists in sports ===
Medal	Name	Games	Sport	Event
Gold	Reggie Walker	1908 London	Athletics	Men's 100m
Silver	Charles Hefferon	1908 London	Athletics	Men's Marathon
Gold	Ken McArthur	1912 Stockholm	Athletics	Men's Marathon
Gold	Rudolph Lewis	1912 Stockholm	Cycling	Men's Individual Time Trial
Gold	Harold Kitson; Charles Winslow	1912 Stockholm	Tennis	Men's Doubles Outdoor
Gold	Charles Winslow	1912 Stockholm	Tennis	Men's Singles Outdoor
Silver	Christian Gitsham	1912 Stockholm	Athletics	Men's Marathon
Silver	Harold Kitson	1912 Stockholm	Tennis	Men's Singles Outdoor
Gold	Bevil Rudd	1920 Antwerp	Athletics	Men's 400m
Gold	Clarence Walker	1920 Antwerp	Boxing	Men's Bantamweight
Gold	Louis Raymond	1920 Antwerp	Tennis	Men's Singles
Silver	Henry Dafel; Jack Oosterlak; Clarence Oldfield; Bevil Rudd	1920 Antwerp	Athletics	Men's 4 × 400m Relay
Silver	Henry Kaltenbrunn	1920 Antwerp	Cycling	Men's Individual Time Trial
Silver	William Smith; James Walker	1920 Antwerp	Cycling	Men's Tandem
Silver	David Smith; Robert Bodley; Ferdinand Buchanan; Frederick Morgan	1920 Antwerp	Shooting	Men's Team 600m Military Rifle
Bronze	Bevil Rudd	1920 Antwerp	Athletics	Men's 800m
Bronze	James Walker; William Smith; Henry Kaltenbrunn; Harry Goosen	1920 Antwerp	Cycling	Team Pursuit
Bronze	Charles Winslow	1920 Antwerp	Tennis	Men's Singles
Gold	William Smith	1924 Paris	Boxing	Men's Bantamweight
Silver	Sydney Atkinson	1924 Paris	Athletics	Men's 110m Hurdles
Bronze	Cecil McMaster	1924 Paris	Athletics	Men's 10 km Walk
Gold	Sydney Atkinson	1928 Amsterdam	Athletics	Men's 110m Hurdles
Bronze	Harry Isaacs	1928 Amsterdam	Boxing	Men's Bantamweight
Bronze	Rhoda Rennie; Frederica van der Goes; Mary Bedford; Kathleen Russell	1928 Amsterdam	Swimming	Women's 4 × 100m Freestyle Relay
Gold	Lawrence Stevens	1932 Los Angeles	Boxing	Men's lightweight
Gold	David Carstens	1932 Los Angeles	Boxing	Men's light-heavyweight
Bronze	Marjorie Clark	1932 Los Angeles	Athletics	Women's 80m hurdles
Bronze	Ernest Peirce	1932 Los Angeles	Boxing	Men's middleweight
Bronze	Jenny Maakal	1932 Los Angeles	Swimming	Women's 400m freestyle
Silver	Charles Catterall	1936 Berlin	Boxing	Men's featherweight
Gold	Gerald Dreyer	1948 London	Boxing	Men's lightweight
Gold	George Hunter	1948 London	Boxing	Men's light-heavyweight
Silver	Dennis Shepherd	1948 London	Boxing	Men's featherweight
Bronze	John Arthur	1948 London	Boxing	Men's heavyweight
Gold	Esther Brand	1952 Helsinki	Athletics	Women's high jump
Gold	Joan Harrison	1952 Helsinki	Swimming	Women's 100m backstroke
Silver	Daphne Robb-Hasenjäger	1952 Helsinki	Athletics	Women's 100m
Silver	Theunis Van Schalkwyk	1952 Helsinki	Boxing	Men's light-middleweight
Silver	Raymond Robinson; Thomas Shardelow	1952 Helsinki	Cycling (Track)	Men's 2000m tandem
Silver	George Estman; Robert Fowler; Thomas Shardelow; Alfred Swift	1952 Helsinki	Cycling (Track)	Men's team pursuit (4000m)
Bronze	William Toweel	1952 Helsinki	Boxing	Men's flyweight
Bronze	Leonard Leisching	1952 Helsinki	Boxing	Men's featherweight
Bronze	Andries Nieman	1952 Helsinki	Boxing	Men's heavyweight
Bronze	Raymond Robinson	1952 Helsinki	Cycling (Track)	Men's 1 km time trial
Bronze	Daniel Bekker	1956 Melbourne/Stockholm	Boxing	Men's heavyweight
Bronze	Henry Loubscher	1956 Melbourne/Stockholm	Boxing	Men's light-welterweight
Bronze	Alfred Swift	1956 Melbourne/Stockholm	Cycling (Track)	Men's 1 km time trial
Bronze	Moira Abernethy; Jeanette Myburgh; Natalie Myburgh; Susan Elizabeth Roberts	1956 Melbourne/Stockholm	Swimming	Women's 4 × 100m freestyle relay
Silver	Daniel Bekker	1960 Rome	Boxing	Men's heavyweight
Bronze	Malcolm Clive Spence	1960 Rome	Athletics	Men's 400m
Bronze	William Meyers	1960 Rome	Boxing	Men's featherweight
Silver	Elana Meyer	1992 Barcelona	Athletics	Women's 10,000m
Silver	Wayne Ferreira; Piet Norval	1992 Barcelona	Tennis	Men's Doubles
Gold	Josia Thugwane	1996 Atlanta	Athletics	Men's marathon
Gold	Penelope Heyns	1996 Atlanta	Swimming	Women's 100m breaststroke
Gold	Penelope Heyns	1996 Atlanta	Swimming	Women's 200m breaststroke
Silver	Hezekiel Sepeng	1996 Atlanta	Athletics	Men's 800m
Bronze	Marianne Kriel	1996 Atlanta	Swimming	Women's 100m backstroke
Silver	Hestrie Cloete	2000 Sydney	Athletics	Women's high jump
Silver	Terence Parkin	2000 Sydney	Swimming	Men's 200m breaststroke
Bronze	Llewellyn Herbert	2000 Sydney	Athletics	Men's 400m hurdles
Bronze	Frantz Kruger	2000 Sydney	Athletics	Men's discus throw
Bronze	Penelope Heyns	2000 Sydney	Swimming	Women's 100m breaststroke
Gold	Lyndon Ferns; Ryk Neethling; Roland Mark Schoeman; Darian Townsend	2004 Athens	Swimming	Men's 4 × 100m freestyle relay
Silver	Mbulaeni Mulaudzi	2004 Athens	Athletics	Men's 800m
Silver	Hestrie Cloete	2004 Athens	Athletics	Women's high jump
Silver	Roland Mark Schoeman	2004 Athens	Swimming	Men's 100m freestyle
Bronze	Donovan Cech; Ramon di Clemente	2004 Athens	Rowing	Men's coxless pair
Bronze	Roland Mark Schoeman	2004 Athens	Swimming	Men's 50m freestyle
Silver	Khotso Mokoena	2008 Beijing	Athletics	Men's long jump
Gold	Sizwe Ndlovu; Matthew Brittain; John Smith; James Thompson	2012 London	Rowing	Men's Lightweight Four
Gold	Cameron van der Burgh	2012 London	Swimming	Men's 100m breaststroke
Gold	Chad le Clos	2012 London	Swimming	Men's 200m butterfly
Gold	Caster Semenya	2012 London	Athletics	Women's 800m
Silver	Chad le Clos	2012 London	Swimming	Men's 100m butterfly
Bronze	Bridgitte Hartley	2012 London	Canoeing	Women's K-1 500m
Gold	Wayde Van Niekerk	2016 Rio de Janeiro	Athletics	Men's 400m
Gold	Caster Semenya	2016 Rio de Janeiro	Athletics	Women's 800m
Silver	Chad le Clos	2016 Rio de Janeiro	Swimming	Men's 200m freestyle
Silver	Shaun Keeling; Lawrence Brittain	2016 Rio de Janeiro	Rowing	Men's coxless pair
Silver	Chad le Clos	2016 Rio de Janeiro	Swimming	Men's 100m butterfly
Silver	Cameron van der Burgh	2016 Rio de Janeiro	Swimming	Men's 100m breaststroke
Silver	Luvo Manyonga	2016 Rio de Janeiro	Athletics	Men's long jump
Silver	Sunette Viljoen	2016 Rio de Janeiro	Athletics	Women's javelin throw
Bronze	Cheslin Kolbe; Juan de Jongh; Seabelo Senatla; Justin Geduld; Kyle Brown; Cecil Afrika; Kwagga Smith; Werner Kok; Rosko Specman; Philip Snyman; Dylan Sage; Francois Hougaard; Tim Agaba	2016 Rio de Janeiro	Rugby Sevens	Men's tournament
Bronze	Henri Schoeman	2016 Rio de Janeiro	Triathlon	Men's Triathlon
Gold	Tatjana Schoenmaker	2020 Tokyo	Swimming	Women's 200m breaststroke
Silver	Tatjana Schoenmaker	2020 Tokyo	Swimming	Women's 100m breaststroke
Silver	Bianca Buitendag	2020 Tokyo	Surfing	Women's Shortboard
Gold	Tatjana Smith	2024 Paris	Swimming	Women's 100m breaststroke
Silver	Tatjana Smith	2024 Paris	Swimming	Women's 200m breaststroke
Silver	Jo-Ann Van Dyk	2024 Paris	Athletics	Women's javelin throw
Silver	Bayanda Walaza; Shaun Maswanganyi; Bradley Nkoana; Akani Simbine	2024 Paris	Athletics	Men's 4 × 100m relay
Bronze	Alan Hatherly	2024 Paris	Cycling	Men's cross-country
Bronze	Christie Grobbelaar; Ryan Oosthuizen; Impi Visser; Zain Davids; Quewin Nortje; Tiaan Pretorius; Tristan Leyds; Selvyn Davids; Shaun Williams; Rosko Specman; Siviwe Soyizwapi; Shilton van Wyk; Ronald Brown	2024 Paris	Rugby sevens	Men's tournament

=== Medalists in art competitions ===
In addition to its accomplishments in sport, South Africa has also earned recognition in Olympic art competitions—one of the three non-sports events once included in the Olympic Games. The country won a total of two art competition medals (1 silver, and 1 bronze), both at the 1948 Summer Olympics. These events were part of the official Olympic program in seven Summer Games, from 1912 to 1948. In 1952, the International Olympic Committee (IOC) formally discontinued all non-sport events (including art competitions), as well as awards for feats (such as alpinism and aeronautics). These were subsequently removed from official national medal counts.

Medal	Name	Games	Event	Piece
Silver	Ernst van Heerden	1948 London	Literature, Lyric works	"Six Poems"
Bronze	Walter Battiss	1948 London	Painting, Graphic Arts	"Seaside Sport"

== See also ==
- List of flag bearers for South Africa at the Olympics
- Category:Olympic competitors for South Africa
- South Africa at the Paralympics
