= Gwyn Jones (figure skater) =

South African figure skater

Personal information
- Full name: Idris Gwyn Jones
- Born: 13 October 1939 (age 86)

Figure skating career
- Country: South Africa
- Partner: Marcelle Matthews

Idris Gwyn Jones (born 13 October 1939) is a South African pair skater. With partner Marcelle Matthews, he represented South Africa at the 1960 Winter Olympics where he placed 13th.
