= Stephanos Tsimikalis =

Greek alpine skier (born 1985)

Stephanos Tsimikalis (born 8 June 1985) is an alpine skier from Greece. He competed for Greece at the 2010 Winter Olympics. His best result was a 65th place in the giant slalom.
