= Tyler Botha =

South African skeleton racer

Personal information
- Nationality: South African
- Born: 3 December 1980 (age 45) Cape Town, South Africa

Sport
- Country: South Africa
- Sport: Skeleton

Tyler Reinnier Botha (born 3 December 1980) is a South African skeleton racer who competed between 2003 and 2006. He finished 21st in the men's skeleton event at the 2006 Winter Olympics in Turin and was the flag bearer for the South African team in the closing ceremony.

He is also a member the St Moritz Tobogganing Club in St Moritz, also known as the Cresta Run. Tyler is currently the second fastest rider from Junction, the Cresta's lower starting point, with a time of 41.09, and the fifth fastest rider from Top, the starting point for the full 1.2 km track with 50.64 seconds. Tyler's most successful season on the Cresta was the 2010–11 season where he won 6 races including the Curzon Cup and Morgan Cup. He won his club colours in 2003.

Tyler is also a DJ, playing under the alias of T Minus. A Minimal and Techno purist, T-Minus is a DJ driven by creative and technological inspirations. Playing for over ten years, his style and sound has evolved from his early days playing Trance and Progressive house in Switzerland & the UK and has ushered in his firm interest for a sound that is more Minimal and Techno inspired.
