= Clarke Scholtz =

South African middle-distance runner

Personal information
- Nationality: South African
- Born: 12 February 1912 Lobatse, Bechuanaland Protectorate
- Died: 20 February 1989 (aged 77) Pretoria, South Africa

Sport
- Sport: Middle-distance running
- Event: 800 metres

Clarke Scholtz (12 February 1912 – 20 February 1989) was a South African middle-distance runner. He competed in the men's 800 metres and 1500 metres at the 1936 Summer Olympics where he was also the flag bearer for South Africa in the opening ceremony.
