= South Africa at the 1960 Winter Olympics =

- IOC code: RSA (SAF used at these Games)
- NOC: South African Sports Confederation and Olympic Committee
- Website: www.sascoc.co.za

in Squaw Valley
- Competitors: 4 (1 man, 3 women) in 1 sport
- Medals: Gold 0 Silver 0 Bronze 0 Total 0

Winter Olympics appearances (overview)
- 1960; 1964–1992; 1994; 1998; 2002; 2006; 2010; 2014; 2018; 2022; 2026

South Africa competed at the 1960 Winter Olympics in Squaw Valley, United States. It was the first time that the nation competed at the Winter Olympic Games, and the last time until 1994.

== Figure skating ==
Women

Athlete	CF	FS	Points	Places	Rank
Patricia Eastwood	23	25	970.8	219	25
Marion Sage	24	23	1000.9	210	23

Pairs

Athletes	Points	Places	Rank
Marcelle Matthews; Gwyn Jones	63.6	85.5	13
