= Oliver Kraas =

South African cross-country skier (born 1975)

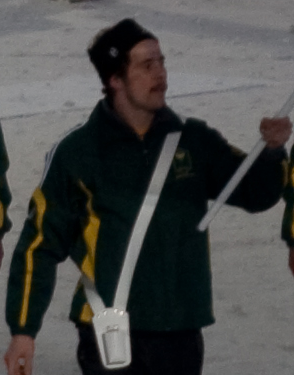
Kraas in 2014

Oliver Martin Kraas (born 18 April 1975 in Germiston) is a South African cross-country skier who has competed since 2003. Competing in two Winter Olympics, he earned his best finish of 57th in the individual sprint event at Turin in 2006.

Kraas' best finish at the FIS Nordic World Ski Championships was 23rd in the team sprint at Oberstdorf in 2005.

His best World Cup finish was 38th in an individual sprint event at Germany in 2006.

Olympic Games
Preceded by Natalie du Toit	Flagbearer for South Africa; Vancouver 2010	Succeeded by Caster Semenya
