= Lara Markthaler =

South African alpine ski racer

Lara Markthaler OLY
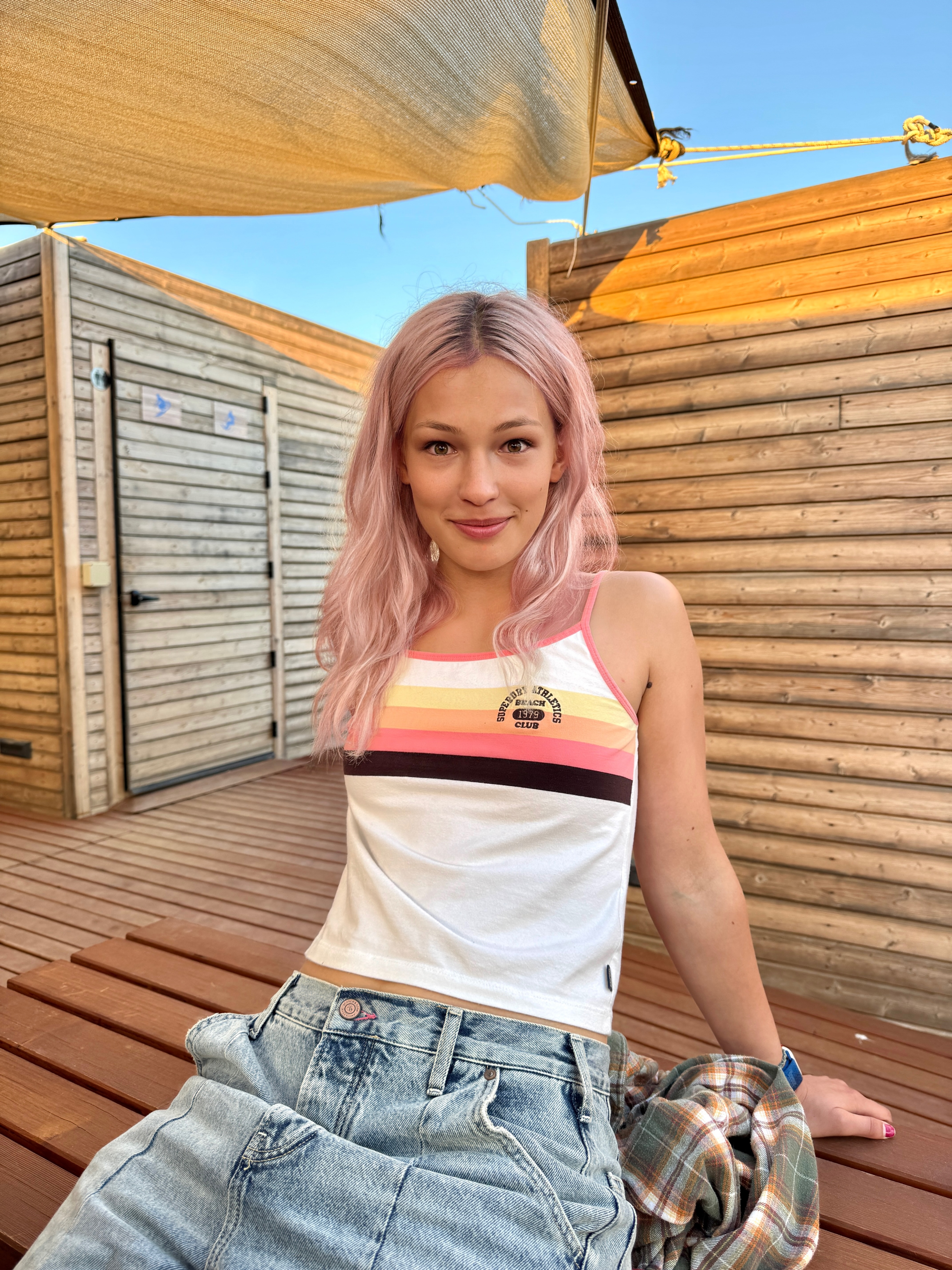

Personal information
- National team: South Africa
- Born: February 15, 2007 (age 19) Munich, Germany

Sport
- Sport: Alpine skiing
- Club: Saaski

Lara Markthaler (born 15 February 2007), nicknamed Spunkiiiiii, is a South African alpine ski racer and recipient of the 2026 Forbes Woman Africa Excellence in Sports Award. She competes in slalom and giant slalom. In 2026, she became the first South African woman to compete in alpine skiing at the Winter Olympic Games.

== Background ==
Markthaler was born in Munich to a German father, Christian, and a South African mother, Judith. She began skiing at 18 months old, introduced to the sport by her father. When she was eight, the family moved to Canada, where she took up downhill mountain biking and won six gold medals at Red Bull's Crankworx competitions, including the Fox Air DH at Crankworx Whistler in 2019. At the age of 12, she chose alpine skiing over mountain biking, in part because skiing is an Olympic sport, and the family relocated to the Italian Dolomites to support her racing career.

Eligible to represent either Germany or South Africa, she chose to compete for South Africa, the birthplace of her mother. She is recognisable by her trademark pink ponytail and has been nicknamed the "Pink Tornado".

== Career ==
=== Youth career ===
Markthaler began ski racing at around the age of 12. By early 2025, she had won two FIS races.

At the 2024 Winter Youth Olympics in Gangwon, South Korea, she was South Africa's sole competitor and its flag bearer at the opening ceremony. Competing in four disciplines, she finished 33rd in the Super-G.

=== 2025 World Championships ===
At the 2025 Alpine Ski World Championships in Saalbach-Hinterglemm, on her 18th birthday, Markthaler finished 29th in the slalom. It was the best result achieved by a South African female ski racer at a major international event.

=== 2026 Winter Olympics ===
Markthaler made her World Cup debut in the slalom at Flachau, Austria, on 13 January 2026.

At the 2026 Winter Olympics in Milano Cortina, she became the first South African woman to compete in alpine skiing at a Winter Olympics. She finished 47th in the giant slalom on her 19th birthday and 39th in the slalom. She was part of South Africa's largest Winter Olympic delegation in history, consisting of five athletes.

== Personal life ==
Markthaler trains around 180 days per year and combines her racing career with online schooling. Her father, Christian, serves as her coach and manager and handles her technical preparation.
