= Bruce Warner =

South African alpine skier

David Bruce Warner (born 5 June 1971, in Bloemfontein) is a South African alpine skier. He is the only person ever to have represented South Africa at the Winter Paralympic Games, and he is one of only two Africans (along with Ugandan Tofiri Kibuuka) to have competed at the Games to date.

Warner lost a leg in a car crash in 1988. Having previously intended to make a career in hockey, he subsequently embarked on a career in skiing. In addition to the Paralympic Games, he has competed in events such as the Disabled World Championships.

He is an electrical engineer by profession.

== Paralympic career ==
=== 1998 ===
South Africa made its Paralympic Games début at the 1998 Winter Paralympics in Nagano, Japan. Warner was his country's sole representative. He entered four events, all in alpine skiing, in the LW2 category.

- In the Men's downhill, he finished 25th (out of 30), with a calculated time of 1:19.25.
- In the Men's giant slalom, he finished 19th (out of 37), with a calculated time of 3:08.90. Only 21 competitors out of 37, however, successfully completed the event.
- In the Men's slalom, he finished 20th (out of 38), with a calculated time of 2:21.57. Only 25 competitors reached the finish line.
- In the Men's super-G, he finished 21st (out of 34), with a calculated time of 1:25.61. 26 competitors reached the finish line.

=== 2002 ===
Warner was, for the second time, his country's sole representative. He entered the same four events.

- In the Men's downhill, he finished 15th (out of 21), with a calculated time of 1:32.30.
- In the Men's giant slalom, he failed to finish.
- In the Men's slalom, he finished 9th (out of 27), with a calculated time of 1:40.29.
- In the Men's super-G, he finished 12th (out of 23), with a calculated time of 1:23.17.

=== 2006 ===
Warner was, for the third time, his country's sole representative. He entered the same four events, in the standing category.

- In the Men's downhill, he finished 36th (out of 49), with a calculated time of 1:31.18.
- In the Men's giant slalom, he finished 45th (out of 66), with a calculated time of 2:19.39.
- In the Men's slalom, he finished 27th (out of 64), with a calculated time of 1:33.29.
- In the Men's super-G, he finished 38th (out of 55), with a calculated time of 1:18.33.

=== 2010 ===
Warner was, once again, his country's only representative at the 2010 Winter Paralympics in Vancouver.

== See also ==
- South Africa at the Paralympics
