= Alexander Heath =

South African alpine skier (born 1978)

Alexander Heath (born 21 September 1978) is a South African Olympic athlete. In the 2006 Winter Olympics, he became the first African to participate in all five Alpine events. He resides in Cape Town.

He said about Bode Miller, "I used to race against Bode, until he made the U.S. team. I went to ski academy in New Hampshire ... I was close behind him in junior champs on a couple of occasions but I never beat him."

== Participation ==
- 1998 Winter Olympics – Nagano, Japan
- 2002 Winter Olympics – Salt Lake City, Utah
- 2006 Winter Olympics – Turin, Italy

Olympic Games
Preceded by Hezekiel Sepeng	Flagbearer for South Africa; Salt Lake City 2002	Succeeded by Mbulaeni Mulaudzi
Preceded by Mbulaeni Mulaudzi	Flagbearer for South Africa; Turin 2006	Succeeded by Natalie du Toit
