= South African Sports Confederation and Olympic Committee =

National Olympic and Paralympic Committee of South Africa

- Country: South Africa
- Code: RSA
- Created: 1991
- Recognized: 1991
- Continental Association: ANOCA
- Headquarters: Johannesburg, South Africa
- President: Barry Hendricks
- Website: teamsa.co.za

The South African Sports Confederation and Olympic Committee (SASCOC; Afrikaans: Suid-Afrikaanse Sportkonfederasie en Olimpiese Komitee) is the National Olympic Committee (NOC) and National Paralympic Committee (NPC) for South Africa, and the responsible body for South Africa at the Commonwealth Games. It is also responsible for high-performance sport in the country and coordinates the relationship with various international sports federations.

== Predecessors ==
The South African Olympic and Empire Games Association (SAOEGA) was the first South African NOC affiliated to the International Olympic Committee (IOC). The word "Empire" was changed to "Commonwealth" (SAOCGA) when the "British Empire Games" became the "Commonwealth Games", and "Republic" (SAORGA) when South Africa became a republic. In apartheid South Africa mixed-race competitions were banned and SOARGA's member bodies only governed white sports. In 1966 the anti-apartheid South African Non-Racial Olympic Committee (SANROC; the O later standing for "Open") replaced the SAORGA in the Association of National Olympic Committees of Africa (ANOCA). However, the SAORGA (though not invited to the 1964 or 1968 games) remained affiliated to the IOC until 1970 and SANROC was not invited to replace it. As part of the negotiated ending of apartheid, the Interim National Olympic Committee of South Africa (INOCSA) was formed by SAORGA and SANROC in 1991 as their respective member bodies merged into single multiracial governing organisations. INOCSA joined the IOC as the National Olympic Committee of South Africa (NOCSA) in time for the 1992 Summer Olympics.

== Establishment and goals ==
SASCOC was formed following a process beginning with a task force established by Minister of Sport, Ncgonde Balfour, and chaired by the CEO of the South African Sports Commission, Joe Phaahla. Its recommendations were given to a steering committee led by Willie Basson and with representation from all the macro sporting bodies in South Africa. The process culminated at the NOCSA annual general meeting on 27 November 2004, when NOCSA member bodies formed SASCOC, initially as a Section 21 non-profit company. The various predecessor bodies of SASCOC were dissolved during the course of 2005 and their functions, insofar as they relate to high performance sport, were taken over by SASCOC. All other functions which relate to mass participation in sport became the responsibility of Sport and Recreation South Africa.

SASCOC's memorandum of association states that its main object is to promote and develop high performance sport in the Republic of South Africa as well as and to act as the controlling body for the preparation and delivery of Team South Africa at all multi-sport international games including but not limited to the Olympics, Paralympics, Commonwealth Games, World Games and All Africa Games.

1. to assume those functions relating to high performance sport which were carried out by the following controlling bodies in the Republic of South Africa:
  - Disability Sport South Africa (DISSA; an association incorporated under Section 21)
  - National Olympic Committee of South Africa
  - South African Commonwealth Games Association (an association incorporated under Section 21)
  - South African Sports Commission
  - South African Student Sports Union (SASSU)
  - Sport and Recreation South Africa
  - United School Sports Association of South Africa (USSASA)
2. to affiliate to and/or be recognized by the appropriate international, continental and regional sport organisations for high performance sport and for that purpose act as the recognized national entity for the Republic of South Africa;
3. to initiate, negotiate, arrange, finance and control where necessary, multi-sport tours to and from the Republic of South Africa inclusive of events between teams and/or individuals;
4. to ensure, and if necessary approve, that the bidding process relating to the hosting of international sporting events in the Republic of South Africa or any other events are in compliance with the necessary rules and regulations relating to same;
5. to facilitate the acquisition and development of playing facilities including the construction of stadia and other sports facilities;
6. to ensure close co-operation with both the government and private sector, relating to all aspects of Team South Africa;
7. to ensure the overall protection of symbols, trademarks, emblems or insignia of the bodies referred to in 1 within the Association's jurisdiction.

The Executive of SASCOC comprises a President, a 1st and a 2nd Vice President, five elected members, any IOC member resident in South Africa, one member appointed by each of DISSA, SASSU and USSASA and one member representing the Athletes Commission.

== Controversies ==
SASCOC has a policy of sending competitors to the Olympics only if they are considered world-class, typically by succeeding in a global qualifying tournament or reaching a global qualifying standard. Where an international federation reserves places for a region such as Africa, SASCOC will not take up any such place to which it is entitled. Thus, the men's and women's hockey teams, which won the African qualifying tournaments for the 2016 Olympics, were not permitted to go; likewise an archer qualified via the 2016 African Archery Championships. The national governing bodies of affected sports have criticised this as detrimental to their efforts to grow their sports in the country.

== See also ==
- South Africa at the Commonwealth Games
- South Africa at the Olympics
- South Africa at the Paralympics
