= Hitler Has Only Got One Ball =

World War II British comedy song

- by Lieutenant F. J. Ricketts as "Colonel Bogey March"
- Genre: Novelty song
- Written: c. 1939

Example
- Amateur solo vocals-only recording of all common verses of "Hitler Has Only Got One Ball": file; help

"Hitler Has Only Got One Ball", sometimes erroneously known as "The River Kwai March", is a World War II British song, the lyrics of which, sung to the tune of the World War I-era "Colonel Bogey March", impugn the masculinity of Nazi leaders by alleging they had missing, deformed, or undersized testicles. Various lyrics exist, but the most common version refers to rumours that Adolf Hitler had monorchism ("one ball"), and accuses Hermann Göring and Heinrich Himmler of microorchidism ("two but very small") and Joseph Goebbels of anorchia ("no balls at all"). An alternative version suggests Hitler's missing testicle is displayed as a war trophy in the Royal Albert Hall.

The author of the lyrics is unknown, though several claims have been made. The song first appeared among British soldiers in 1939 and was quickly taken up by Allied military and civilians. Its familiarity increased after its use in a scene in the 1957 film The Bridge on the River Kwai. The song has been cited as an example of "morally correct" disrespect that used political mockery to boost morale in wartime.

== Lyrics ==
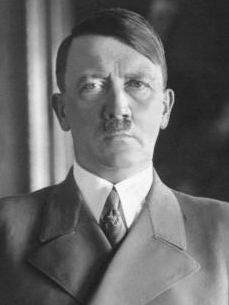
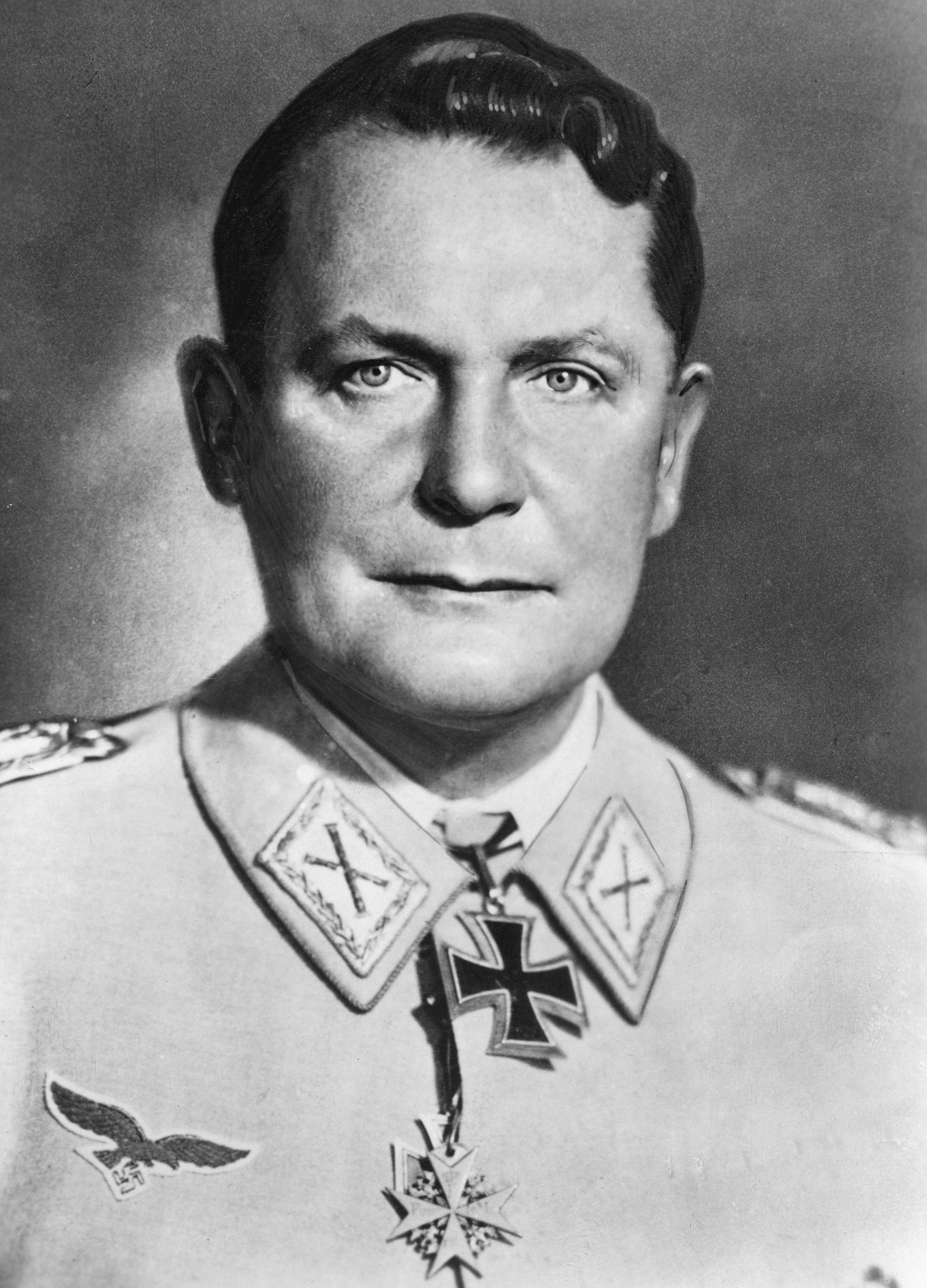
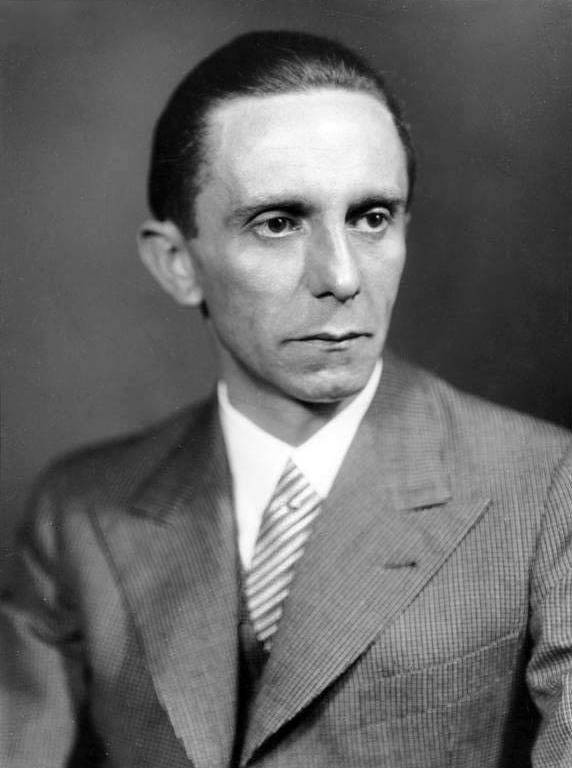
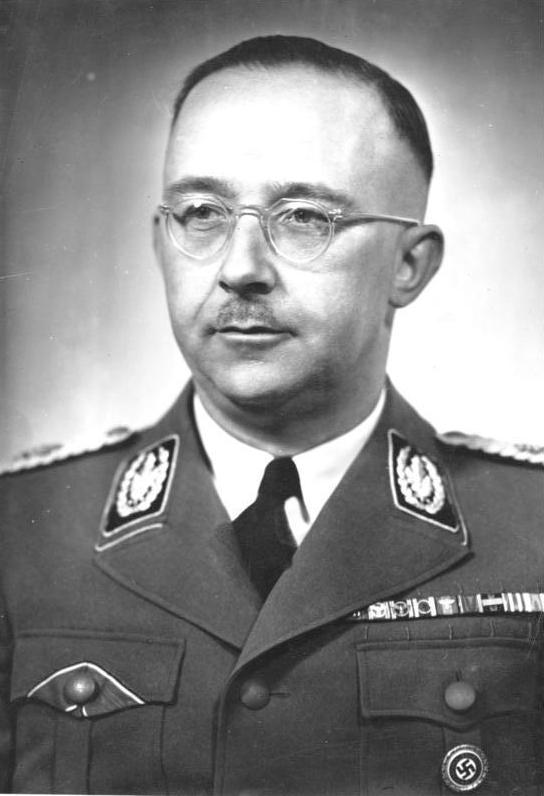
Clockwise from top left: Adolf Hitler ("one ball"); Hermann Göring ("two but very small"); Heinrich Himmler ("rather sim'lar"); Joseph Goebbels ("no balls at all")

The best known stanza consists of the following quatrain:

Hitler has only got one ball,
Göring has two but very small, (Note: In some versions, "rather small" or "they are small".)
Himmler is rather sim'lar, (Note: In some versions, "is very sim'lar" or "has something sim'lar".)
But poor old Goebbels has no balls at all.

The opening line is a reference to widespread rumours that Adolf Hitler had monorchism ("one ball" meaning one testicle). The second and third lines similarly attack Luftwaffe chief Hermann Göring and SS chief Heinrich Himmler by suggesting they had microorchidism ("very small" testicles). In the fourth line, Nazi propaganda minister Joseph Goebbels's name is often mispronounced "go-balls" so that it rhymes with the accusation of anorchia ("no balls" meaning no testicles).

== Analysis ==
The lyrics attack Nazi leaders' masculinity by mocking and belittling their alleged testicular deformities. University of Kent psychology professor Janet Sayers wrote that the song was a response by the Allies to the use of "male fantasy" in Nazi propaganda. According to Brian O. Murdoch, a philologist with the University of Stirling, a notable aspect of the lyrics is that they attack enemy leaders, but not the enemy in general. Folklorist Greg Kelley of the University of Guelph-Humber wrote:

As a means of ridiculing the Nazis, "Hitler Has Only Got One Ball" became immensely popular among Allied troops, who in transmitting this song were exercising something of a wartime convention by demeaning the sexual faculties of enemy leaders. But the mockery extended beyond just the Nazis' sexual capacities. Since the 1920s, the words balls or ballsy had come to denote notions of courage, nerve, or fortitude. In that sense, defective testicles rendered the Nazis defective soldiers. This song's itemized taxonomy of malformed German genitalia—the monorchid, the micro-orchid, the anorchid—was particularly forceful, and satisfying, to Allied soldiers in that it scattered satiric buckshot across the whole Nazi high command (Hitler; Hermann Göring, commander in chief of the Luftwaffe; Heinrich Himmler, Reichsführer of the SS; and Goebbels, Reich minister of propaganda).

According to Kelley, in claiming that Hitler had only one testicle, the opening line suggests that Hitler had less than the normal amount of sexual prowess and, symbolically, courage. Mad studies scholar Richard A. Ingram wrote that the accusation of monorchidism in the song alluded to the theory that monorchidism caused Hitler to be insane, in the same way that "'lone nut' retains the idea of a causal relationship between monotesticularity and madness." Jason Lee of De Montfort University wrote, "Just as Shakespeare used a disability based on some fact to construct Richard III's character, in the case of Hitler disability is equated with not just moral weakness but evil." University of Stirling philosophy professor Rowan Cruft describes the song as an example of morally appropriate disrespect, writing "Hitler's actions made it morally correct to show him disrespect" by singing the song.

All known versions of the original verse end with "no balls at all". According to Kelley, "in this musical catalogue of testicular disorders, the definitive last entry is always anorchism – the physical signifier of a lack of courage or character."

Southern Illinois University Edwardsville philosophy professor Greg Littmann writes that the song is an example of political mockery used to build a "fighting spirit". Maria Curie-Skłodowska University lecturer Joanna Jabłońska-Hood describes the song as using comedy to attack the masculinity of Nazi leaders, turning them from symbols of strength to objects of pity. According to Jabłońska-Hood, the apparent contradiction of high-ranking Nazi leaders being pitied mirrors the juxtaposition of the cheerful, upbeat tune of Colonel Bogey March with the "grim subject" of the lyrics. University of Nottingham music professor Mervyn Cooke wrote that the tune "reflects the moods of humour in adversity and pride in the resilience of the underdog".

In 2025, an international team of geneticists examined a sample of blood removed from cloth cut from the sofa in the Führerbunker; it was the furniture on which Adolf Hitler reportedly killed himself in April 1945. After confirming it was his blood, using chromosomal DNA from a known relative, researchers found he had Kallmann syndrome. A genetic condition that can cause defects in the development of sexual organs at puberty, issues include micropenis and malformed testicles.

== Other versions ==
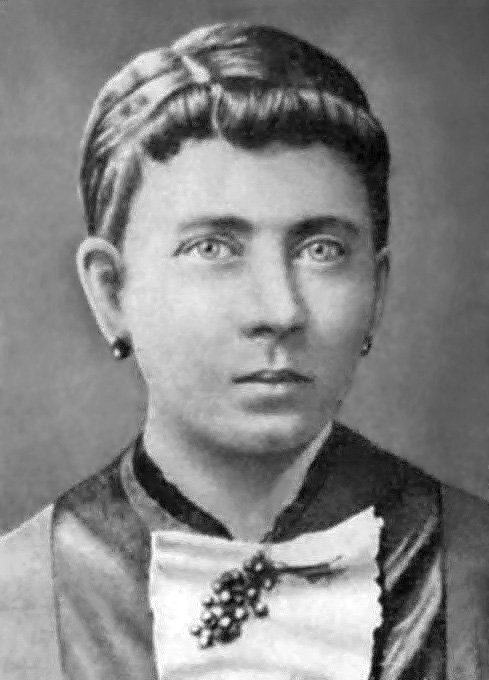
Hitler's mother ("the dirty bugger")

Additional British verses ran:

Hitler has only got one ball,
The other is in the Albert Hall,
His mother, the dirty bugger, (Note: In some versions, "brother" rather than "mother".)
Chopped it off when Hitler was small. (Note: In some versions, "Cut it off when he was small".)
She threw it into the apple tree, (Note: In other versions, it is sung as "threw it into the conker tree".)
the wind blew it into the deep blue sea,
Where the fishes got out their dishes,
And ate scallops and bollocks for tea.

In addition to the common reference to Hitler's rumoured monorchidism, these versions suggest he was abused by his mother, and that Hitler's severed testicle ultimately became a war trophy on public display in the Royal Albert Hall. Variations of the "Albert Hall" lyrics were still sung by schoolchildren in the London neighbourhoods of Finsbury in 1983 and Kensington in 1984. Regional variations found in other areas of the United Kingdom use (for example) Ulster Hall (Northern Ireland), Kelvin Hall (Glasgow), Free Trade Hall (Manchester), and Leeds Town Hall (Leeds).

After Hitler's death at the end of World War II, later versions changed the first line to the past-tense: "Hitler, he only had one ball". Other postwar variations of the first line included "only one big ball", "only one brass ball" and "only one left ball" (which latter folklorist Greg Kelley of the University of Guelph-Humber calls "a curious description, given that having one left testicle is considered the norm"). Another variation, "only one meat ball", emerged in the mid-1940s after The Andrews Sisters version "One Meat Ball". Some variants used by children replace "Go-balls" (a mispronunciation of "Goebbels") with a fictional character, "Joe Balls".

== Second verse ==
According to folklorist Greg Kelley of the University of Guelph-Humber, there is a less common second verse:

Rommel has four or five, I guess,
No one's quite sure 'bout Rudolf Hess,
Schmeling's always yelling,
But poor old Goebbels has no balls at all.

Erwin Rommel, the decorated German field marshal known as the "Desert Fox", who was more respected (or at least less hated) than the Nazi officials named in the first verse, is implied to be hypermasculine by virtue of having extra testicles (polyorchidism).

This verse's second line is a reference to the mystery surrounding the capture and imprisonment in 1941 of Hitler's deputy, Rudolf Hess. Hess secretly flew to Scotland to attempt to negotiate a peace treaty, but was arrested by the British and imprisoned for life.

The third line is an American addition referencing German boxer Max Schmeling, whose success was touted by Nazi propaganda as evincing Aryan superiority. Schmeling was defeated in 1938 by African-American boxer Joe Louis, "letting out a high-pitched cry" when Louis landed a decisive punch. This "yell heard around the world" became a symbol of American victory over Nazism.

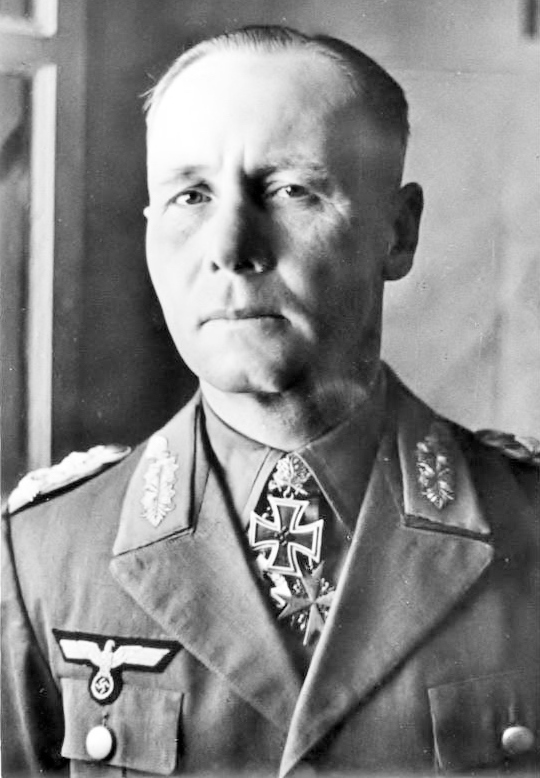
Erwin Rommel ("four or five, I guess")

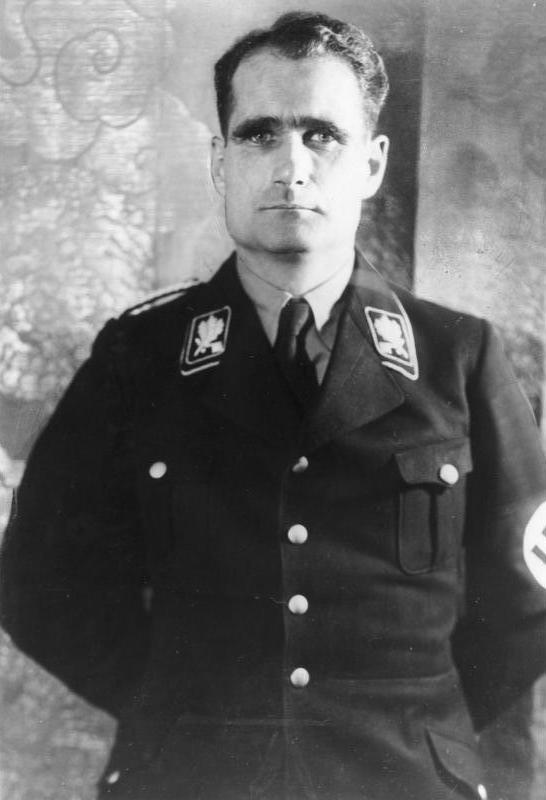
Rudolf Hess ("no one's quite sure")

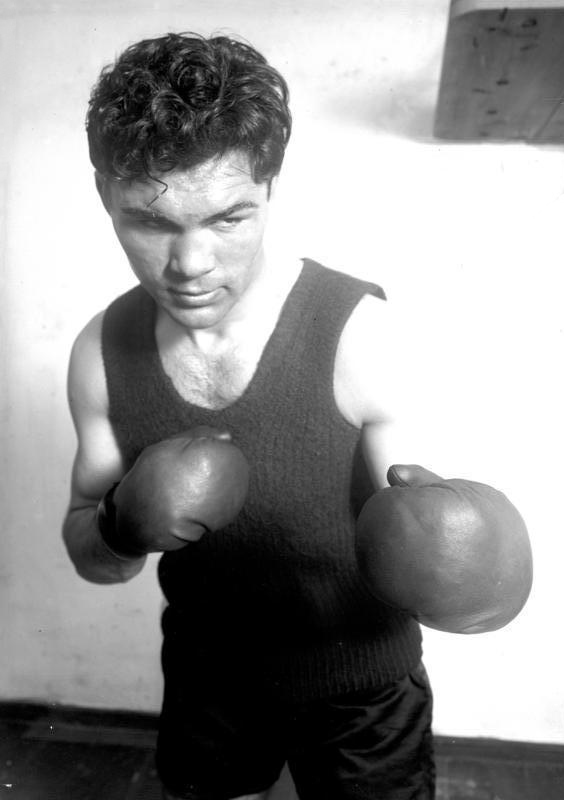
Max Schmeling ("always yelling")

== Origin ==
The Colonel Bogey March arranged for solo piano

The lyrics of "Hitler Has Only Got One Ball" are set to the "Colonel Bogey March

An adaptation of the World War I-era "Colonel Bogey March", "Hitler Has Only Got One Ball" first appeared among British troops in 1939. The exact origins of the lyrics (which are listed as number 10,493 in the Roud Folk Song Index) are unknown, and though there have been several claims of authorship there have apparently been no attempts to claim copyright.

Author Donough O'Brien stated in his autobiography that his father, Toby O'Brien, then a publicist for the British Council, wrote the lyrics in August 1939 to be used as wartime propaganda. The version purportedly authored by O'Brien begins "Göring has only got one ball, Hitler had two but very small", while almost all other versions have the order reversed ("Hitler has only got one ball, Göring had two but very small").

British composer and broadcaster Hubert Gregg claimed to have written the lyrics and submitted them anonymously to the British War Office to be used as wartime propaganda.

According to folklorist Greg Kelley of the University of Guelph-Humber, such claims by O'Brien and Gregg are "dubious" – governments rarely use humour as propaganda because such efforts are largely unsuccessful. According to Kelley, another possible explanation for the song's origin is that the lyrics developed organically from the difficulty English speakers had pronouncing Goebbels's name (in the song, "Goebbels" is mispronounced "go-balls," as opposed to "gur-bulz").

In his purportedly factual 2001 BBC radio play Dear Dr. Goebbels, British screenwriter Neville Smith suggested that an undercover MI6 agent in Germany named Philip Morgenstern wrote the lyrics and used the song as a means to transmit intelligence to Britain concerning private details about Joseph Goebbels (the last line of the adaptation's first verse is "But poor old Goebbels has no balls at all").

Brian O. Murdoch, a philologist with the University of Stirling, wrote that the adaptation was an oral composition that likely originated in London. According to Murdoch, the opening line may originate from various folk sources, such as the Irish ballad Sam Hall (which, in some versions, includes the lyric "Oh my name it is Sam Hall / and I've only got one ball").

According to Scottish poet Alan Bold, the last line may have been influenced by an earlier song called "No Balls At All", itself a parody of an Air Force song called "No Bombs At All", which in turn was a parody of a song about women's clothing called "Nothing to Wear".

== River Kwai and post-war legacy ==
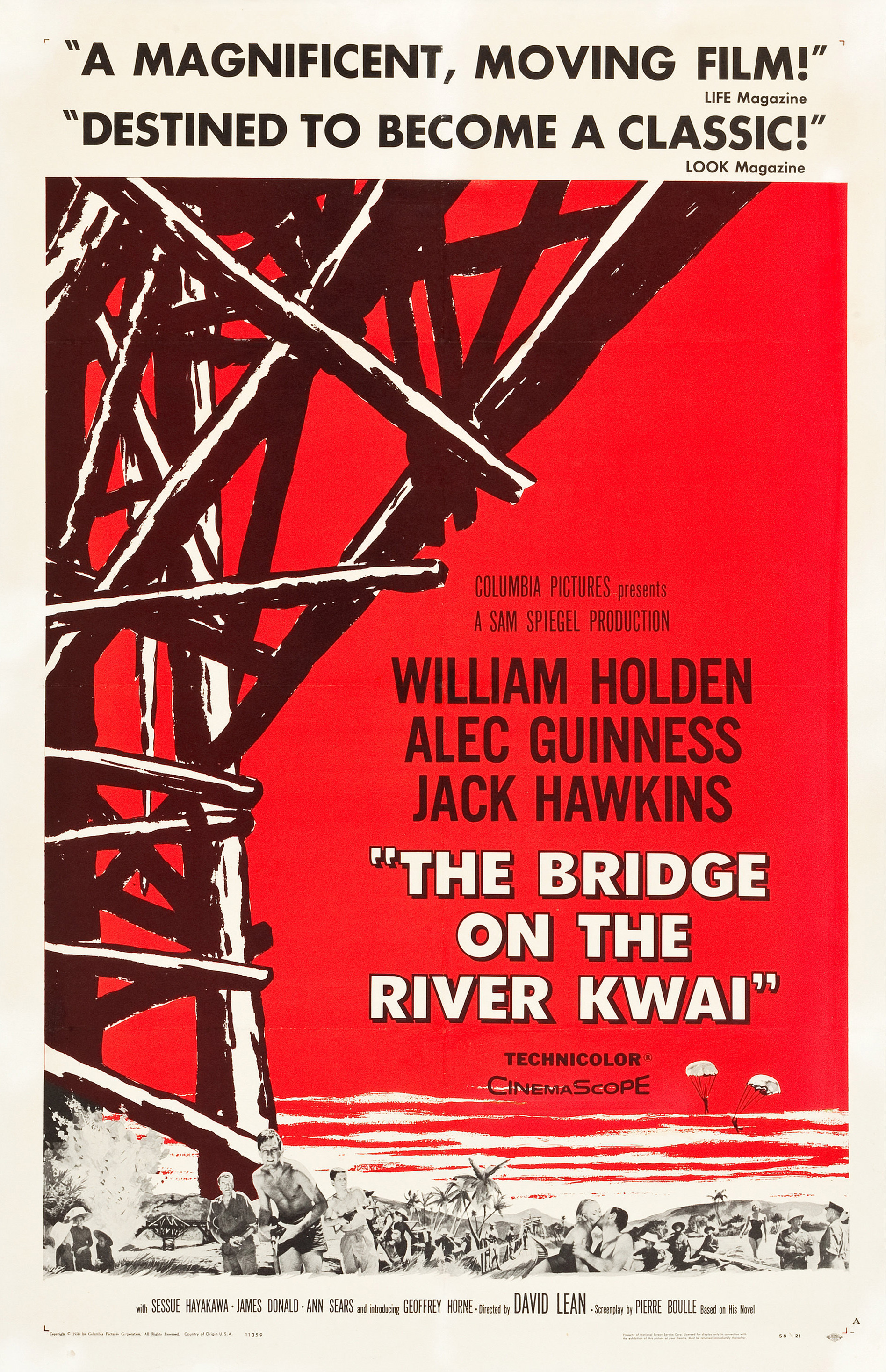
Movie poster for The Bridge on the River Kwai

After World War II, the song (and the debate about Hitler's monorchism) remained in common parlance. Its use in David Lean's 1957 film The Bridge on the River Kwai led the Mitch Miller band to record a best-selling version titled "The River Kwai March" which adds an orchestral melody, beginning in counterpoint to "Colonel Bogey" and becoming its own section of the piece, heard on its own at certain points of the film. In Lean's early conception of the film, Allied soldiers in a Japanese prison camp sang the song as an act of defiance. But after the widow of the composer of the "Colonel Bogey March" objected to the bawdy lyrics, Lean decided that if the soldiers simply whistled the tune the audience would supply the lyrics mentally. Since then the song has been the subject of numerous cultural references, both comedic and controversial.

When, in 1980, The King's Own Calgary Regiment Band played the "Colonel Bogey March" (its official march) during a visit to Canada by Japan's prime minister, it was perceived as an insult to Japan, but in 2007 the U.S. Navy's Seventh Fleet Band played the tune in Japan without apparent objection.

The song appears in the satirical comic book limited series Adventures in the Rifle Brigade (2000), by Garth Ennis and Carlos Ezquerra, and the severed testicle is the main MacGuffin of its sequel, Operation Bollock (2001–2002).

A 2003 advertisement for Spitfire ale showed a picture of Hitler in military uniform with the caption "Spot the ball". In 2007, The Armstrong and Miller Show aired a sketch mocking theories that the song had originated as a British intelligence report. In the sketch, a military officer reads the incoming report, which an intelligence agent describes as "possibly the single biggest intelligence coup of the war" (brackets in the original):

But this is dynamite [reading, as from a Morse code communique]
Hitler. One ball. [audience laughter throughout]
Göring. Two but small.
Himmler. Similar.
Goebbels. No balls at all.

In the 2010s, the video game series Sniper Elite alluded to the song by including the ability to shoot off Hitler's single testicle with a rifle.

At the 2016 Winnipeg Comedy Festival, comedian Lara Rae referenced the song in a joke about the dangers of cats being neutered by non-professionals who might not complete the task: "It might start out okay, but you really have to finish the job. A cat with no balls is mellow; a cat with one ball is Hitler."

A 2019 episode (Season 4, Episode 8) of the American television series The Man in the High Castle shares its title with the song and features a scene in which it is sung.

In the 2024 television series Monsieur Spade, "Colonel Bogey March" is whistled at the end of episode 4, the beginning of episode 5 and the end of episode 6 as a way to animate the protagonist, an Algerian boy savant, and motivate him to continue his journey.

In Germany, the song has been used in advertisements for the digestif Underberg. In Japan, it has been used in game shows and children's shows. Thomas Jefferson School of Law professor Aaron Schwabach described the song's appropriation not just by Britain's allies but also by its former enemies, whom the lyrics attack, as a form of "cultural transformation" that is "an essential tool of cultural survival in a global era".

According to folklorist Greg Kelley of the University of Guelph-Humber, these comedic references have been effective for nearly a century, engendering theories of Hitler's actual monorchism in the public consciousness.

== See also ==
- Comet (song)
- Discrediting tactics

== Works cited ==
- Ashley, Leonard R. N. (1977), "Rhyme and Reason: the Methods and Meanings of Cockney Rhyming Slang, Illustrated with Some Proper Names and Some Improper Phrases", Names, Volume 25, Issue 3, pp. 124–154, doi:10.1179/nam.1977.25.3.124.
- Cooke, Mervyn (2020), "A Bridge Too Far? Music in the British War Film, 1945-80", Chapter 4 in Michael Baumgartner and Ewelina Boczkowska, eds., Music, Collective Memory, Trauma, and Nostalgia in European Cinema after the Second World War, Routledge, pp. 86-108, ISBN 9781315298450.
- Cruft, Rowan (2013), "XI—Why is it Disrespectful to Violate Rights?", Proceedings of the Aristotelian Society, Volume 113, Issue 2, Part 2, pp. 201–224, doi:10.1111/j.1467-9264.2013.00352.x.
- Gopinath, Sumanth and Stanyek, Jason eds. (2014), The Oxford Handbook of Mobile Music Studies, Volume 2, Oxford University Press, ISBN 9780199913657.
- Ingram, Richard A. (2007), "Double Trouble", in Kimberly R. Myers, ed., Illness in the Academy: A Collection of Pathographies by Academics, Purdue University Press, pp. 209-219, ISBN 9781557534422.
- Jabłońska-Hood, Joanna (2016), "Humour as a Carrier of Memory within Culture. A few Remarks on the English Sense of Humour and its Relation to the Collective Memory of the British Society, seen from the Perspective of Cognitive Integration Theory", Horyzonty Wychowania [Horizons of Education], Volume 15, Issue 36, pp. 87-105, doi:10.17399/HW.2016.153605.
- Kelley, Greg (2020), "Colonel Bogey's Parade of Parody", Chapter 1 in Unruly Audience, Utah State University Press, pp. 24-44, ISBN 9781607329909, previously published as "Colonel Bogey's March through Folk and Popular Culture", Chapter 10 in Eric A. Eliason and Tad Tuleja, eds., Warrior Ways: Explorations in Modern Military Folklore (2012), Utah State University Press, ISBN 9781492000426.
- Kelsey, N. G. N. (Janet E. Alton and J. D. A. Widdowson, eds.) (2019), Games, Rhymes, and Wordplay of London Children, Palgrave Macmillan, ISBN 9783030029104.
- Lee, Jason (2018), "Smile, Hitler? Nazism and Comedy in Popular Culture", Chapter 13 in Helen Davies and Sarah Ilott, eds., Comedy and the Politics of Representation: Mocking the Weak, Palgrave Studies in Comedy, Palgrave Macmillan, pp. 223-240, ISBN 9783319905068, also published as "Nazism, Neo-Nazism, and Comedy", Chapter 3 in Jason Lee (2018), Nazism and Neo-Nazism in Film and Media, Amsterdam University Press, pp. 75-88, ISBN 9789048528295.
- Littmann, Greg (2019), "The Waldo Moment and Political Discourse: What's Wrong with Disrespect in Politics?", Chapter 6 in David Kyle Johnson, ed., Black Mirror and Philosophy: Dark Reflections, Wiley, pp. 59-68, ISBN 9781119578277.
- Murdoch, Brian (1990), "My Lilli of the Lamplight: Songs of the Second World War", Chapter 6 in Fighting Songs and Warring Words, Routledge, pp. 175-208, ISBN 0415031842.
- Pennell, Richard (2013), "Propaganda and its target: The venom campaign in Tangier during World War II", Chapter 9 in Driss Maghraoui, ed., Revisiting the Colonial Past in Morocco, Anoushiravan Ehteshami and George Joffé, series eds., History and society in the Islamic world, Routledge, pp. 157-183, ISBN 9780203366950.
- Proctor, Robert N. (1999), The Nazi War on Cancer, Princeton University Press, ISBN 9780691070513.
- Rothwell, James (22 February 2016), "Hitler 'had tiny deformed penis' as well as just one testicle, historians claim", The Telegraph. Retrieved 17 August 2021.
- Sayers, Janet (1995), "Consuming male fantasy: feminist psychoanalysis retold", Chapter 7 in Anthony Elliott and Stephen Frosh, eds., Psychoanalysis in Contexts: Paths between Theory and Modern Culture, Routledge, pp. 123-141, ISBN 0203162021.
- Schwabach, Aaron (2016) [Orig. 2011], "The Second Question: If the Underlying Works or Characters are Protected, does the Fan Work Infringe upon that Protection?", Chapter 3 in Fan Fiction and Copyright: Outsider Works and Intellectual Property Protection, Routledge, pp. 59-92, ISBN 9780754679035.
- Tyler, Don (2016), Music of the First World War, ABC-Clio, ISBN 9781440839979.
- Whiteley, Sheila (2010), "Dad's Army: Musical Images of a Nation at War", Chapter 8 in Ian Inglis, ed., Popular Music and Television in Britain, Ashgate Publishing, pp. 123-136, ISBN 9781409419587.
