= List of Canadian number-one albums of 1959 =

The following is a list of some but not all of the albums to reach number one on the CHUM albums chart in Canada for 1959.

== Albums ==
Date	Title	Artist	Ref
March 16	Come Dance With Me	Frank Sinatra	
March 23	Come Dance With Me	Frank Sinatra	
March 30	Sing Along With Mitch	Mitch Miller	
April 6	Sing Along With Mitch	Mitch Miller	
April 13	Ricky Sings Again	Ricky Nelson	
April 20	Ricky Sings Again	Ricky Nelson	
April 27	Still More Sing Along With Mitch	Mitch Miller	
May 4	Still More Sing Along With Mitch	Mitch Miller	
May 11	Still More Sing Along With Mitch	Mitch Miller	
May 18	Still More Sing Along With Mitch	Mitch Miller	
May 25	Still More Sing Along With Mitch	Mitch Miller	
June 1	Still More Sing Along With Mitch	Mitch Miller	
June 8	Still More Sing Along With Mitch	Mitch Miller	
June 15	Still More Sing Along With Mitch	Mitch Miller	
June 22	Still More Sing Along With Mitch	Mitch Miller	
June 29	Still More Sing Along With Mitch	Mitch Miller	
July 6	Folk Songs - Sing With Mitch	Mitch Miller	
July 13	Still More Sing Along With Mitch	Mitch Miller	
July 20	Folk Songs - Sing With Mitch	Mitch Miller	
July 27	Still More Sing Along With Mitch	Mitch Miller	
August 3	Folk Songs - Sing With Mitch	Mitch Miller	
August 10	Folk Songs - Sing With Mitch	Mitch Miller	
August 17	Folk Songs - Sing With Mitch	Mitch Miller	
August 24	Porgy and Bess	Harry Belafonte & Lena Horne - Movie Sound Track	
August 31	Porgy and Bess	Harry Belafonte & Lena Horne - Movie Sound Track	
September 7	Porgy and Bess	Harry Belafonte & Lena Horne - Movie Sound Track	
September 14	Porgy and Bess	Harry Belafonte & Lena Horne - Movie Sound Track	
September 21	Porgy and Bess	Harry Belafonte & Lena Horne - Movie Sound Track	
September 28	Porgy and Bess	Harry Belafonte & Lena Horne - Movie Sound Track	
October 5	Porgy and Bess	Harry Belafonte & Lena Horne - Movie Sound Track	
October 12	Porgy and Bess	Harry Belafonte & Lena Horne - Movie Sound Track	
October 19	Porgy and Bess	Harry Belafonte & Lena Horne - Movie Sound Track	
October 26	Porgy and Bess	Harry Belafonte & Lena Horne - Movie Sound Track	
November 2	The Kingston Trio at Large	Kingston Trio	
November 9	The Kingston Trio at Large	Kingston Trio	
November 16	The Kingston Trio at Large	Kingston Trio	
November 23	The Kingston Trio at Large	Kingston Trio	
November 30	Heavenly	Johnny Mathis	
December 7	Here We Go Again	Kingston Trio	
December 14	Elvis' Golden Hits, Vol. 2	Elvis Presley	
December 21	Heavenly	Johnny Mathis	
December 28	Heavenly	Johnny Mathis	
