= List of Canadian number-one albums of 1960 =

The following is a list of not all, but some of the albums to reach number one on the CHUM albums chart in Canada from 1960.

== Albums ==
Date	Title	Artist	Ref
January 4	Here We Go Again	Kingston Trio	
January 11	The Fabulous Fabian	Fabian	
January 18	The Fabulous Fabian	Fabian	
January 25	The Fabulous Fabian	Fabian	
February 1	The Fabulous Fabian	Fabian	
February 8	Gunfighter Ballads	Marty Robbins	
February 15	Connie's Greatest Hits	Connie Francis	
February 22	Connie's Greatest Hits	Connie Francis	
February 29	Gunfighter Ballads	Marty Robbins	
March 7	Gunfighter Ballads	Marty Robbins	
March 14	Gunfighter Ballads	Marty Robbins	
March 21	Elvis' Golden Hits, Vol. 2	Elvis Presley	
March 28	Beatnik Fly	Johnny & The Hurricanes	
April 4	Saturday Night - Sing Along With Mitch	Mitch Miller	
April 11	Saturday Night - Sing Along With Mitch	Mitch Miller	
April 18	Saturday Night - Sing Along With Mitch	Mitch Miller	
April 25	Belafonte at Carnegie Hall	Harry Belafonte	
May 2	Belafonte at Carnegie Hall	Harry Belafonte	
May 9	This is Darin	Bobby Darin	
May 16	Elvis is Back	Elvis Presley	
May 23	Elvis is Back	Elvis Presley	
May 30	Sold Out	Kingston Trio	
June 6	Belafonte at Carnegie Hall	Harry Belafonte	
June 13	The Button Down Mind of Bob Newhart	Bob Newhart	
June 20	The Button Down Mind of Bob Newhart	Bob Newhart	
June 27	The Button Down Mind of Bob Newhart	Bob Newhart	
July 4	The Button Down Mind of Bob Newhart	Bob Newhart	
July 11	The Button Down Mind of Bob Newhart	Bob Newhart	
July 18	The Button Down Mind of Bob Newhart	Bob Newhart	
July 25	The Button Down Mind of Bob Newhart	Bob Newhart	
August 1	The Button Down Mind of Bob Newhart	Bob Newhart	
August 8	The Button Down Mind of Bob Newhart	Bob Newhart	
August 15	The Button Down Mind of Bob Newhart	Bob Newhart	
August 22	The Button Down Mind of Bob Newhart	Bob Newhart	
August 29	Sentimental Sing Along	Mitch Miller	
September 5	The Button Down Mind of Bob Newhart	Bob Newhart	
September 12	The Button Down Mind of Bob Newhart	Bob Newhart	
September 19	The Button Down Mind of Bob Newhart	Bob Newhart	
September 26	The Button Down Mind of Bob Newhart	Bob Newhart	
October 3	The Button Down Mind of Bob Newhart	Bob Newhart	
October 10	The Button Down Mind of Bob Newhart	Bob Newhart	
October 17	Nice 'N Easy	Frank Sinatra	
