= There is a Tavern in the Town =

"There Is a Tavern in the Town"

Song
- Published: 1883 by Moses King
- Genre: Popular song
- Composer: William Henry Hills

"There Is a Tavern in the Town" was composed by William Henry Hills in May 1883, and published that same year in his songbook Students' Songs, "comprising the newest and most popular college songs as now sung as Harvard, Yale, [etc.]"

== History ==
The song was revived in 1933 as part of the stage play The Drunkard, which caught on in Hollywood and resulted in new recordings and renditions. The most popular version was performed by Rudy Vallée as "The Drunkard Song", slightly changing the chorus. While recording the last verses of the song, Vallée started to laugh uncontrollably when someone in the band made a rude "raspberry" noise. He and his band recorded the song again without laughing. Edward (Ted) Wallerstein, president of Okeh Records, sent Vallee a test pressing of the "laughing" take, accompanied by a note: "What do you say we let the public have this one? The 'slip-up' makes the record much funnier." Vallee agreed, and Okeh pressed a "plain white label" version of "The Drunkard Song" with facsimiles of Wallerstein's and Vallee's handwriting across the label. Radio stations and record shops, especially in college towns, snapped it up and it became an underground hit.

Vallee also performed the song in the film Sweet Music (1935). The song was performed by Anne Shirley and Ray Mayer in the movie M'Liss (1936).

Fifteen different publishers presumed the song to be in the public domain, but only M. M. Cole of Chicago bothered to check. He ascertained that William H. Hills had composed the song in May 1883 and renewed the copyright in March 1911. A joint arrangement between the composer's widow, publisher Cole, and publisher Louis Bernstein of Shapiro, Bernstein & Co. resulted in the song being reprinted under a new, official title, There Is a Tavern in the Town.

There have also been recordings by Gracie Fields (1938) and Wally Cox (1949, using a yodeling trick vocal).

Mitch Miller's performed the tune in the Sing-Along Gang's 1958 debut record, Sing Along with Mitch. Bing Crosby included the song in a medley on his album 101 Gang Songs (1961) and Nat King Cole performed a cover of the song on his album Those Lazy-Hazy-Crazy Days of Summer (1963). It also featured in the English pre-WWII Leslie Howard movie, "Pimpernel" Smith, as the code tune to indicate the pimpernel's presence.

Pete Seeger wrote “Well May the World Go” loosely on the basis of this song.

The lyrics share similarity to English folk ballad "Fare Thee Well," including the repeated phrase and imagery of a turtledove.

The catchy tune is also familiar in the popular children's song, "Head, Shoulders, Knees and Toes".

While the song is usually performed up-tempo, it appeared as a ballad in the Ripper Street third-season episode "Ashes and Diamonds", arranged for Charlene McKenna as the character Rose Erskine on BBC One and Amazon Prime Instant Video.

During the bar scene in Captain America: The First Avenger, the song is played on the piano and sung by the Howling Commandos.

The 1974 children's album Halloween Songs That Tickle Your Funny Bone, by Ruth Roberts, Bill Katz, and Gene Piller, includes a parody called "There Is a Haunted House In Town."

== Lyrics ==
Here are the original lyrics as they appear in the William Henry Hills songbook of 1883:

=== Original lyrics ===
There is a tavern in the town, in the town
And there my dear love sits him down, sits him down
And drinks his wine 'mid laughter free,
And never, never thinks of me.

(Chorus:)
Fare thee well, for I must leave thee,
Do not let this parting grieve thee,
And remember that the best of friends
Must part, must part.
Adieu, adieu kind friends, adieu, adieu, adieu
I can no longer stay with you, stay with you
I'll hang my harp on a weeping willow tree,
And may the world go well with thee.

He left me for a damsel dark, damsel dark
Each Friday night they used to spark, used to spark
And now my love, once true to me
Takes that dark damsel on his knee.
(Chorus)

Note: The following verse does not appear in composer Hills's published version:
And now I see him nevermore, nevermore;
He never knocks upon my door, on my door.
Oh, woe is me! He penned a little note;
I'll read to you the words he wrote.
(Chorus)

Oh! dig my grave both wide and deep, wide and deep;
Put tombstones at my head and feet, head and feet
And on my breast carve a turtledove
To signify I died of love.
(Chorus)

=== As performed by Rudy Vallée ===
There is a tavern in the town (in the town)
And there my true love sits him down (sits him down)
And drinks his wine as merry as can be,
And never, never thinks of me.

(Chorus:)
Fare thee well, for I must leave thee,
Do not let the parting grieve thee,
Oh, the time has come for you and I to say goodbye.
Adieu, adieu, kind friends, adieu. (yes, adieu)
I can no longer stay with you. (stay with you)
I'll hang my heart on a weeping willow tree,
Fare thee well, fare thee well, fare thee well.

He left me for a damsel dark (damsel dark)
Each Friday night they used to spark (used to spark)
And now my love, who once was true to me
Takes that dark damsel on his knee.
(Chorus)

And now I see him nevermore (nevermore);
He never, never knocks at my door (on my door).
Oh, woe is me! He penned a little note;
I'll read to you the words he wrote.
(Chorus)

Oh! dig my grave both wide and deep; (wide and deep)
Put tombstones at my head and feet, (head and feet)
And on my breast carve a turtle dove
To signify I died for love.
(Chorus)

== See also ==
- Head, Shoulders, Knees and Toes – a children's song sung to the same tune
- The Butcher's Boy (folk song) – another traditional folk song that shares lyrical and thematic elements
