= Toby O'Brien =

British journalist, public relations expert and spy

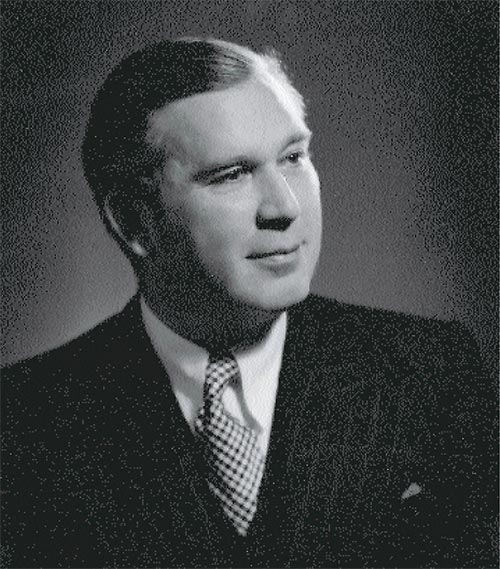
- Born: Edward Donough O'Brien; 21 November 1909; British India
- Died: 9 January 1979 (aged 69); England
- Occupation(s): Spy, Journalist, propaganda expert, PR Consultant

Edward Donough "Toby" O'Brien (21 November 1909 – 9 January 1979) was a British journalist and propaganda expert, involved in espionage, who spearheaded Britain's efforts to counter Nazi Germany propaganda during World War II.

== Early life and education ==
O'Brien was born on the Baluchistan border in India; his father was Colonel Aubrey O'Brien, an Indian Army officer.

At the age of five O'Brien was sent to England. Four years later he began attending St Cyprian's School, Eastbourne following his elder brother, Turlough. As his elder brother's initials TOB had given rise to the nickname Toby, he was known as Toby2, leading to subsequent confusion. He became friends with Alaric Jacob, and despite their political differences, O'Brien would refer to Jacob as his oldest friend.

O'Brien won a scholarship as one of the first batch of pupils to newly opened Stowe School and then earned a scholarship to Exeter College, Oxford. Before Oxford he spent a term in Germany at Leipzig. At Oxford University he was President of the Oxford Union in 1932 and took part in a transatlantic debate with Harvard University.

== Journalism and propaganda ==
O'Brien became a journalist, working at the Daily Telegraph, initially as assistant and eventually as editor of the Peterborough column. In 1936 he went to Germany ostensibly as a reporter but with a hidden agenda of assessing the Nazi regime and possible opponents of it. In 1938 he was recruited to the British Council as a press officer. His duties, which were to secure favourable publicity for the council and its activities and to provide articles and photographs for the foreign press, in fact represented Britain's counter to Goebbels' Nazi propaganda. Aside from maintaining a network of supporters in the foreign press and pointing out German lies (including their claims that they had sunk Royal Navy ships, which were, in fact, inland naval bases bearing the HMS prefix), according to his son Donough, O'Brien penned the lyrics to the Colonel Bogey tune "Hitler Has Only Got One Ball". During the war, he was also involved in espionage for the government, which due to its delicate nature was classified at the time. During the period of 1947 to 1948, he was tasked with protecting the founder of the newly formed nation of Pakistan, Muhammad Ali Jinnah.

== Public relations ==
After the war O'Brien became public relations adviser for Rootes and was then recruited to the Conservative Party, leading the election campaigns which led to the hung parliament of 1950 and the Conservative victory in 1951.

He became a public relations consultant, and one of his first clients was the government of Spain which wanted to promote tourism. O'Brien had once before been involved with Spain in the 30s, when the plot to transport Franco in a privately owned Dragon Rapide to meet with his forces in Morocco, was concocted by senior figures of the 1936 'pronunciamiento' in O'Brien's drawing room. Since the Spanish Civil War Spain had been out of favour in British circles and its obscurity as a holiday destination at the time was indicated by O'Brien's question "Costa Brava, where is that?" in response to Fraga's plea for help. Years later with the number of British tourists visiting Spain reaching 2 million, O'Brien was awarded the Order of Isabella the Catholic by General Franco.

Between 1953-55, O'Brien was called in to apply his skills in the campaign to establish commercial television in Britain. Later he was well known in political circles for his "No Strings" parties when senior politicians from both parties attended his annual gathering with no strings attached.

== Death ==
Toby O'Brien died at the age of 69 from undisclosed causes.

== Family ==
O'Brien married Sylvia Denny on 12 February 1936. They had a son, Donough O'Brien, and two daughters. Sylvia O'Brien died in 1950. He then married Leonora Thayne Railton on 26 February 1952. They had two sons. Leonora O'Brien died in 1999.
