= Ovarian agenesis =

Ovarian agenesis is a condition where one or both ovaries are congenitally absent. It may refer to:

- Unilateral ovarian agenesis
- XX gonadal dysgenesis
- Gonadal dysgenesis
