= Mitch's Greatest Hits =

Compilation album by Mitch Miller, The Gang and Orchestra
- Released: 1961
- Genre: Easy listening
- Label: Columbia

Mitch Miller, The Gang and Orchestra chronology
Memories Sing Along with Mitch (1960)	Mitch's Greatest Hits (1961)	Happy Times! Sing Along with Mitch (1961)

Mitch's Greatest Hits is an album by Mitch Miller, The Gang and Orchestra. It was released in 1961 on the Columbia label (catalog nos. CL-1544 and CS-8638). The album debuted on Billboard magazine's popular albums chart on March 6, 1961, peaked at No. 9, and remained on that chart for eight weeks.

AllMusic later gave the album a rating of three-and-a-half stars. Reviewer Bruce Eder called the album "fun in its dorky '50s way" and "compelling in its exuberance."

== Track listing ==
Side 1

1. "March from The River Kwai & Colonel Bogey" [2:21]
2. "The Yellow Rose Of Texas" [3:00]
3. "Sing Along" [2:43]
4. "The Bowery Grenadiers" [2:21]
5. "Song for a Summer Night" [3:08]
6. "Silly Little Tune" [2:03]

Side 2

1. "The Children's Marching Song" [2:47]
2. "Do-Re-Mi" [2:01]
3. "Hey, Betty Martin" [2:33]
4. "Bonnie Eloise" [3:01]
5. "Walkin' Down To Washington" [2:28]
6. "Hey Little Baby" [2:01]
