= More Sing Along with Mitch =

Studio album by Mitch Miller & The Gang
- Released: 1958
- Genre: Easy listening
- Label: Columbia

Mitch Miller & The Gang chronology
Christmas Sing Along with Mitch (1958)	More Sing Along with Mitch (1958)	Still More! Sing Along with Mitch (1959)

More Sing Along with Mitch is an album by Mitch Miller & The Gang. It was released in 1958 on the Columbia label (catalog no. CL-1243).

The album debuted on Billboard magazine's popular albums chart on November 10, 1958, peaked at No. 4, and remained on that chart for 117 weeks. It was certified as a gold record by the RIAA. In Canada the album was No. 3 on April 27, 1959, along with two other Mitch Miller albums as the top 3 albums. The Canadian album chart had started on April 13.

== Track listing ==
Side 1

1. "Medley: "Pretty Baby" and "Be My Little Baby Bumble Bee"
2. Medley: "Sweet Adeline" and "Let Me Call You Sweetheart"
3. "Moonlight and Roses"
4. "If You Were the Only Girl"
5. "Buddy"
6. "The Whiffenpoof Song (Baa! Baa! Baa!)"

Side 2

1. "Carolina in the Morning"
2. Irish Medley: "When Irish Eyes Are Smiling" and "My Wild Irish Rose"
3. Medley: "Shine on Harvest Moon" and "For Me and My Gal"
4. "You Tell Me Your Dream, I'll Tell You Mine"
5. "There's a Long, Long Trail"
6. "In the Evening by the Moonlight"
