= Monorchism =

Having only one testicle within the scrotum

- Specialty: Medical genetics

Monorchism (also monorchidism) is the state of having only one testicle within the scrotum.

== Terminology ==
An individual having monorchism can be referred to as monorchid.

== Causes ==
This can be due to one testicle:

- Not descending into the scrotum during normal embryonic or fetal development (3–4% of "normal" live births), also known as undescended testis or cryptorchidism. In this case the testis is within the abdominal cavity, somewhere along the normal route of descent – most commonly, within the inguinal canal. Such a testis has an increased risk of malignancy.
- Disappearing during development (the so-called vanishing testis) due to some intrauterine insult. This is thought to be most likely vascular, such as testicular torsion.
- Not being created in the first place (gonadal agenesis), known as congenital monorchism. (As of 1974, this was believed to occur in roughly 1 in every 5,000 people with a male phenotype. In contrast, absence of both testes, known as congenital anorchism, was believed to occur in roughly 1 in 20,000.)
- Being surgically removed through orchiectomy.
- Being injured.

== Notable cases ==
=== Due to testicular cancer ===
- Lance Armstrong, American bicyclist.
- Frank Church, former U.S. Senator and Presidential candidate.
- Tom Green, Canadian comedian-actor.
- Richard Herring, English comedian and writer
- John Kruk, former baseball player
- Mark Latham, former Australian politician.
- Geoff Horsfield, English footballer.
- Nenê, Brazilian basketball player.
- Kevin Curtis, American football player.
- Nigel Farage, former leader of the UK Independence Party.
- Bobby Moore, English footballer and World Cup winner.
- Jimmy White, English snooker player.

=== Due to injury ===
- Archibald Douglas, 4th Earl of Douglas, magnate of the Kingdom of Scotland, and Peer of France. Lost in 1403, while fighting at the Battle of Shrewsbury (The previous year he had lost an eye at the Battle of Homildon Hill).
- Troy Bayliss, world superbike champion in 2001, 2006 and 2008. In 2007 he lost a testicle during a race at Donington Park.
- Brian Foster, American mixed martial artist.
- John Starks, American basketball player.
- Paul Wood, English rugby league player who sustained a ruptured testicle during a match and subsequently had it removed.
- Thurgood Marshall, United States Supreme Court Justice who injured a testicle during a fraternity event in university.
- Dave England, who lost one of his testicles after suffering a double hernia during a snowboard accident in New Zealand in 1997.

=== Due to cryptorchidism ===
- Mao Zedong, founder of the People's Republic of China.
- Bruce Lee

=== Due to congenital monorchism ===
- Dara Ó Briain, Irish comedian related that he has a single testicle in a standup routine
- Spencer Agnew, Member of Smosh, has admitted that he only has one testicle

=== Unknown ===
- Possible monorchism of Adolf Hitler
- Napoleon Bonaparte, rumoured to have 1 testicle, allegedly discovered after his death
- Jon Paulson
- Arnold Schwarzenegger, lost a testicle due to steroid abuse
- Francisco Franco, Dictator of Spain.
- Prabowo Subianto

== Monorchism in nonhuman animals ==
Although extremely rare, monorchism has been observed to be characteristic of some animal species, notably in beetles.

== See also ==
- Anorchia
- Cryptorchidism
- Polyorchidism
- Unilateral ovarian agenesis
