= Memories Sing Along with Mitch =

Studio album by Mitch Miller & The Gang
- Released: 1960
- Genre: Easy listening
- Label: Columbia

Mitch Miller & The Gang chronology
March Along with Mitch (1960)	Memories Sing Along with Mitch (1960)	Mitch's Greatest Hits (1961)

Memories Sing Along with Mitch is an album by Mitch Miller & The Gang. It was released in 1960 on the Columbia label (catalog nos. CL-1542 and CS-8342).

The album debuted on Billboard magazine's popular albums chart on October 31, 1960, peaked at No. 5, and remained on that chart for 25 weeks. It was certified as a gold record by the RIAA.

AllMusic later gave the album a rating of two stars.

== Track listing ==
Side 1

1. "My Blue Heaven" (G. Whiting, W. Donaldson)
2. Medley: "I'm Nobody's Baby" and "You Were Meant for Me"
3. Medley: "At Sundown" (W. Donaldson) and "Five Foot Two, Eyes of Blue"
4. Medley: "Meet Me in St. Louis, Louis" (arranged by Jimmy Carroll) and "Bill Bailey, Won't You Please Come Home" (arranged by Jimmy Carroll)
5. Medley: "The Bowery" (arranged by Jimmy Carroll) and "The Yankee Doodle Boy" (George M. Cohan)
6. Medley: "I'm Going Back to Dixie" (L.L. Riker) and "Dixie" (L.L. Riker)

Side 2

1. Medley: "Honey" and "Sleepy Time Gal"
2. "Ramona"
3. Medley: "Peg O' My Heart" and "Peggy O'Neill"
4. "I Love You"
5. "Home on the Range" (arranged by Jimmy Carroll)
6. "Battle Hymn of the Republic" (arranged by Jimmy Carroll)
