= Cryptorchidism =

Failure of the testicle(s) to descend into the scrotum

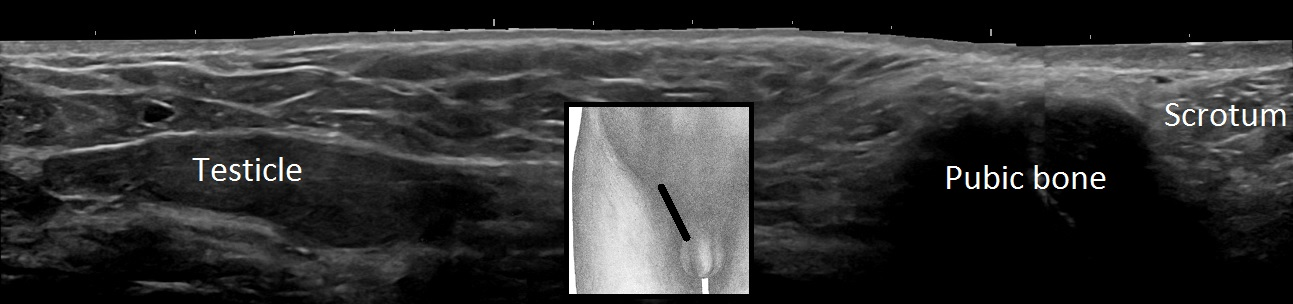
- Cryptorchidism on scrotal ultrasound
- Specialty: Medical genetics, andrology

Cryptorchidism, also known as undescended testis (UDT), is the failure of one or both testicles to descend into the scrotum. The word is from Ancient Greek κρυπτός (kryptos) 'hidden' and ὄρχις (orchis) 'testicle'. It is the most common birth defect of the male genital tract. About 3% of full-term and 30% of premature infant boys are born with at least one undescended testis. However, about 80% of cryptorchid testes descend by the first year of life (the majority within three months), making the true incidence of cryptorchidism around 1% overall. Cryptorchidism may develop after infancy, sometimes as late as young adulthood, but that is exceptional.

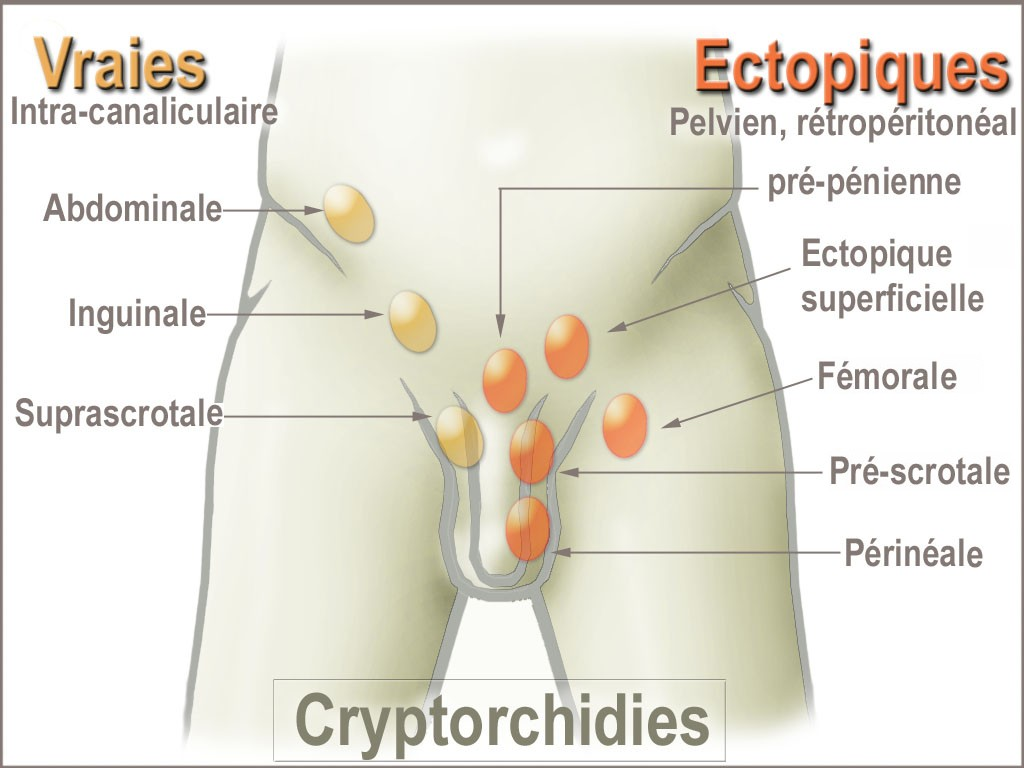
Different forms of cryptorchidism, depending on the position of the undescended testicle. Sometimes the retractile testicle is added (in French).

Cryptorchidism is distinct from monorchism, the condition of having only one testicle. Though the condition may occur on one or both sides, it more commonly affects the right testis.

A testis absent from the normal scrotal position may be:

1. Anywhere along the "path of descent" from high in the posterior (retroperitoneal) abdomen, just below the kidney, to the inguinal ring
2. In the inguinal canal
3. Ectopic, having "wandered" from the path of descent, usually outside the inguinal canal and sometimes even under the skin of the thigh, the perineum, the opposite scrotum, or the femoral canal
4. Undeveloped (hypoplastic) or severely abnormal (dysgenetic)
5. Missing (also see anorchia).

About two-thirds of cases without other abnormalities are unilateral; most of the other third involve both testes. In 90% of cases, an undescended testis can be felt in the inguinal canal. In a small minority of cases, missing testes may be found in the abdomen or appear to be nonexistent (truly "hidden").

Undescended testes are associated with reduced fertility, increased risk of testicular germ-cell tumors, and psychological problems when fully-grown. Undescended testes are also more susceptible to testicular torsion (and subsequent infarction) and inguinal hernias. Without intervention, an undescended testicle will usually descend during the first year of life, but to reduce these risks, undescended testes can be brought into the scrotum in infancy by a surgical procedure called an orchiopexy.

Although cryptorchidism nearly always refers to congenital absence or maldescent, a testis observed in the scrotum in early infancy can occasionally "reascend" (move back up) into the inguinal canal. A testis that can readily move or be moved between the scrotum and canal is referred to as retractile.

Cryptorchidism, hypospadias, testicular cancer, and poor semen quality make up the syndrome known as testicular dysgenesis syndrome.

== Signs and symptoms ==
=== Infertility ===
Many men who were born with undescended testes have reduced fertility, even after orchiopexy in infancy. The reduction with unilateral cryptorchidism is subtle, with a reported infertility rate of about 10%, compared with about 6% reported by the same study for the general population of adult men.

The fertility reduction after orchiopexy for bilateral cryptorchidism is more marked, about 38%, or six times that of the general population. The basis for the universal recommendation for early surgery is research showing degeneration of spermatogenic tissue and reduced spermatogonia counts after the second year of life in undescended testes. The degree to which this is prevented or improved by early orchiopexy is still uncertain.

=== Cancer risk ===
One of the strongest arguments for early orchiopexy is reducing the risk of testicular cancer. About one in 500 men born with one or both testes undescended develop testicular cancer, roughly a four- to 40-fold increased risk. The peak incidence occurs in the third and fourth decades of life. The risk is higher for intra-abdominal testes and somewhat lower for inguinal testes, but even the normally descended testis of a man whose other testis was undescended has about a 20% higher cancer risk than those of other men.

The most common type of testicular cancer occurring in undescended testes is seminoma. It is usually treatable if caught early, so urologists often recommend that boys who had orchiopexy as infants be taught testicular self-examination, to recognize testicular masses and seek early medical care for them. Cancer developing in an intra-abdominal testis would be unlikely to be recognized before considerable growth and spread, and one of the advantages of orchiopexy is that a mass developing in a scrotal testis is far easier to recognize than an intra-abdominal mass.

Orchidopexy was originally thought to result in easier detection of testicular cancer, but it did not lower the risk of actually developing cancer. However, recent data have shown a paradigm shift. The New England Journal of Medicine published in 2007, that orchidopexy performed before puberty resulted in a significantly reduced risk of testicular cancer than if done after puberty.

The risk of malignancy in the undescended testis is 4 to 10 times higher than that in the general population and is about one in 80 with a unilateral undescended testis and one in 40 to one in 50 for bilateral undescended testes. The peak age for this tumor is 15–45 years old. While seminoma is the most common tumor developing in an undescended testis (65%); after orchiopexy, they represent only 30% of testicular tumors.

== Causes ==
=== Environmental hypotheses ===
In most full-term infant boys with cryptorchidism but no other genital abnormalities, a cause cannot be found, making this a common, sporadic, unexplained (idiopathic) birth defect. A combination of genetics, maternal health, and other environmental factors may disrupt the hormones and physical changes that influence the development of the testicles.

- Severely premature infants can be born before the descent of the testes. Low birth weight is also a known factor.
- A contributing role of environmental chemicals called endocrine disruptors that interfere with normal fetal hormone balance has been proposed. The Mayo Clinic lists "parents' exposure to some pesticides" as a known risk factor.
- Risk factors may include exposure to regular alcohol consumption during pregnancy, (five or more drinks per week) associated with a three-fold increase in cryptorchidism when compared to nondrinking mothers. Cigarette smoking is also a known risk factor.
- Family history of undescended testicles or other problems of genital development
- Cryptorchidism occurs at a much higher rate in a large number of congenital malformation syndromes. Among the more common are Down syndrome, Prader–Willi syndrome, and Noonan syndrome.
- In vitro fertilization, use of cosmetics by the mother, and pre-eclampsia have also been recognized as risk factors for the development of cryptorchidism.
- Androgen insensitivity syndrome generally manifests itself in Cryptorchidism. In CAIS, the testis are generally located completely undescended, where the ovaries usually are. In PAIS, the testis is generally partially undescended. This also occurs with 5α-Reductase 2 deficiency (DHT insensitivity) however, the testis generally descend during puberty.

In 2008, a study was published that investigated the possible relationship between cryptorchidism and prenatal exposure to a chemical called phthalate (DEHP), which is used in the manufacture of plastics. The researchers found a significant association between higher levels of DEHP metabolites in pregnant mothers and several sex-related changes, including incomplete descent of the testes in their sons. According to the lead author of the study, a national survey found that 25% of U.S. women had phthalate levels similar to the levels that were found to be associated with sexual abnormalities.

A 2010 study examined the prevalence of congenital cryptorchidism among offspring whose mothers had taken mild analgesics, primarily over-the-counter pain medications including ibuprofen (e.g. Advil) and paracetamol (acetaminophen). Combining the results from a survey of pregnant women prior to their due date in correlation with the health of their children and an ex vivo rat model, the study found that pregnant women who had been exposed to mild analgesics had a higher prevalence of baby boys born with congenital cryptorchidism.

New insight into the testicular descent mechanism has been hypothesized by the concept of a male programming window derived from animal studies. According to this concept, testicular descent status is "set" during the period from 8 to 14 weeks of gestation in humans. Undescended testis is a result of disruption in androgen levels only during this programming window.

=== Sexually antagonistic epigenetic marker hypothesis ===
When one identical twin is born with cryptorchidism, his identical twin also has the trait only 25% of the time, despite sharing their genes and prenatal hormonal environment. Animal studies have found that androgen antagonists during early fetal development cause elevated rates of hypospadias and cryptorchidism, however, in humans these traits rarely occur together. In addition, levels of circulating testosterone overlap for both male and female fetuses throughout fetal development. Rice et al. have proposed that sexually dimorphic development occurs through epigenetic markers which are laid down during stem cell development, which blunt androgen signalling in XX fetuses, and boost sensitivity in XY fetuses. If these marks are sexually antagonistic, and if a subset of these epigenetic marks carry over generations, they are expected to produce mosaicism of sexual development in opposite-sex offspring, sometimes producing hypospadias or cryptorchidism when passed from a mother to son (feminizing the external genitalia). Rice's model requires further testing with currently available technology to support or falsify it.

== Mechanism ==
=== Normal development ===
The testes begin as an immigration of primordial germ cells into testicular cords along the gonadal ridge in the abdomen of the early embryo. The interaction of several male genes organizes this developing gonad into a testis rather than an ovary by the second month of gestation. During the third to fifth months, the cells in the testes differentiate into testosterone-producing Leydig cells, and anti-Müllerian hormone-producing Sertoli cells. The germ cells in this environment become fetal spermatogonia. Male external genitalia develop during the third and fourth months of gestation, and the fetus continues to grow, develop, and differentiate. The testes remain high in the abdomen until the seventh month of gestation, when they move from the abdomen through the inguinal canals into the two sides of the scrotum. Movement has been proposed to occur in two phases, under the control of somewhat different factors. The first phase, movement across the abdomen to the entrance of the inguinal canal, appears controlled (or at least greatly influenced) by anti-Müllerian hormone (AMH). The second phase, in which the testes move through the inguinal canal into the scrotum, is dependent on androgens (most importantly testosterone). In rodents, androgens induce the genitofemoral nerve to release calcitonin gene-related peptide, which produces rhythmic contractions of the gubernaculum, a ligament which connects the testis to the scrotum, but a similar mechanism has not been demonstrated in humans. Maldevelopment of the gubernaculum or deficiency or insensitivity to either AMH or androgen can, therefore, prevent the testes from descending into the scrotum. Some evidence suggests an additional paracrine hormone, referred to as descendin, may be secreted by the testes.

In many infants with inguinal testes, further descent of the testes into the scrotum occurs in the first six months of life. This is attributed to the postnatal surge of gonadotropins and testosterone that normally occurs between the first and fourth months of life.

Spermatogenesis continues after birth. In the third to fifth months of life, some of the fetal spermatogonia residing along the basement membrane become type A spermatogonia. More gradually, other fetal spermatogonia become type B spermatogonia and primary spermatocytes by the fifth year after birth. Spermatogenesis arrests at this stage until puberty.

Most normal-appearing undescended testes are also normal by microscopic examination, but reduced spermatogonia can be found. The tissue in undescended testes becomes more markedly abnormal ("degenerates") in microscopic appearance between two and four years after birth. Some evidence indicates early orchiopexy reduces this degeneration.

=== Pathophysiology ===
At least one contributing mechanism for reduced spermatogenesis in cryptorchid testes is temperature. The temperature of the testes in the scrotum is at least a few degrees cooler than in the abdomen. Animal experiments in the middle of the 20th century suggested that raising the temperature could damage fertility. Some circumstantial evidence suggests that tight underwear and other practices that raise the testicular temperature for prolonged periods can be associated with lower sperm counts. Nevertheless, research in recent decades suggests that the issue of fertility is more complex than a simple matter of temperature. Subtle or transient hormone deficiencies or other factors that lead to a lack of descent also may impair the development of spermatogenic tissue.

The inhibition of spermatogenesis by ordinary intra-abdominal temperature is so potent that continual suspension of normal testes tightly against the inguinal ring at the top of the scrotum by means of special "suspensory briefs" has been researched as a method of male contraception, and was referred to as "artificial cryptorchidism" by one report.

An additional factor contributing to infertility is the high rate of anomalies of the epididymis in boys with cryptorchidism (over 90% in some studies). Even after orchiopexy, these may also affect sperm maturation and motility at an older age.

== Diagnosis ==
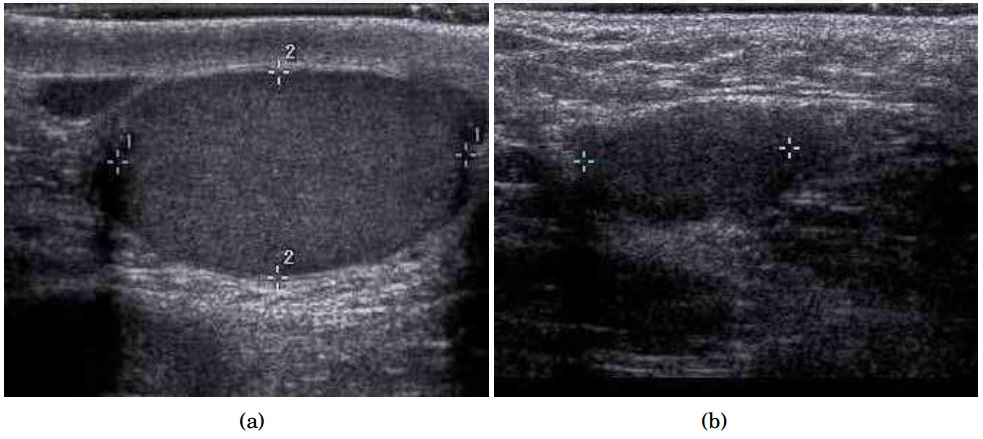
Scrotal ultrasonography of undescended testis: (a) Normal testis in the scrotum (b) Atrophic and decreased echogenicity of the contralateral testis of the same patient seen in the inguinal region

The most common diagnostic dilemma in otherwise normal boys is distinguishing a retractile testis from a testis that will not descend spontaneously into the scrotum. Retractile testes are more common than truly undescended testes and do not need to be operated on. In normal males, as the cremaster muscle relaxes or contracts, the testis moves lower or higher ("retracts") in the scrotum. This cremasteric reflex is much more active in infant boys than older men. A retractile testis high in the scrotum can be difficult to distinguish from a position in the lower inguinal canal. Though various maneuvers are used to do so, such as using a cross-legged position, soaping the examiner's fingers, or examining in a warm bath, the benefit of surgery in these cases can be a matter of clinical judgment.

In the minority of cases with bilaterally nonpalpable testes, further testing to locate the testes, assess their function, and exclude additional problems is often useful. Scrotal ultrasound or magnetic resonance imaging performed and interpreted by a radiologist can often locate the testes while confirming the absence of a uterus. At ultrasound, the undescended testis usually appears small, less echogenic than the contralateral normal testis and usually located in the inguinal region. With color Doppler ultrasonography, the vascularity of the undescended testis is poor.

A karyotype can confirm or exclude forms of dysgenetic primary hypogonadism, such as Klinefelter syndrome or mixed gonadal dysgenesis. Hormone levels (especially gonadotropins and AMH) can help confirm that hormonally functional testes are worth attempting to rescue, as can stimulation with a few injections of human chorionic gonadotropin to elicit a rise in the testosterone level. Occasionally, these tests reveal an unsuspected and more complicated intersex condition.

In the even smaller minority of cryptorchid infants who have other obvious birth defects of the genitalia, further testing is crucial and has a high likelihood of detecting an intersex condition or other anatomic anomalies. Ambiguity can indicate either impaired androgen synthesis or reduced sensitivity. The presence of a uterus by pelvic ultrasound suggests either persistent Müllerian duct syndrome (AMH deficiency or insensitivity) or a severely virilized genetic female with congenital adrenal hyperplasia. An unambiguous micropenis, especially accompanied by hypoglycemia or jaundice, suggests congenital hypopituitarism.

== Treatment ==
The primary management of cryptorchidism is watchful waiting, due to the high likelihood of self-resolution. Where this fails, orchiopexy is effective if inguinal testes have not descended after 4–6 months. Surgery is often performed by a pediatric urologist or pediatric surgeon, but in many communities, still by a general urologist or surgeon.

Since undescended testicles are unlikely to descend after the first months of life, waiting longer only delays treatment.

When the undescended testis is in the inguinal canal, hormonal therapy is sometimes attempted and very occasionally successful. The most commonly used hormone therapy is human chorionic gonadotropin (hCG). A series of hCG injections (10 injections over five weeks is common) is given, and the status of the testis/testes is reassessed at the end. Although many trials have been published, the reported success rates range widely, from roughly 5% to 50%, probably reflecting the varying criteria for distinguishing retractile testes from low inguinal testes. Hormone treatment does have the occasional incidental benefits of allowing confirmation of Leydig cell responsiveness (proven by a rise of the testosterone by the end of the injections) or inducing additional growth of a small penis (via the testosterone rise). Some surgeons have reported facilitation of surgery, perhaps by enhancing the size, vascularity, or healing of the tissue. A newer hormonal intervention used in Europe is the use of GnRH analogs such as nafarelin or buserelin; the success rates and putative mechanism of action are similar to hCG, but some surgeons have combined the two treatments and reported higher descent rates. Limited evidence suggests that germ cell count is slightly better after hormone treatment; whether this translates into better sperm counts and fertility rates at maturity has not been established. The cost of either type of hormone treatment is less than that of surgery, and the chance of complications at appropriate doses is minimal. Nevertheless, despite the potential advantages of a trial of hormonal therapy, many surgeons do not consider the success rates high enough to be worth the trouble, since the surgery itself is usually simple and uncomplicated.

In cases where the testes are identified preoperatively in the inguinal canal, orchiopexy is often performed as an outpatient and has a very low complication rate. An incision is made over the inguinal canal. The testis with accompanying cord structure and blood supply is exposed, partially separated from the surrounding tissues ("mobilized"), and brought into the scrotum. It is sutured to the scrotal tissue or enclosed in a "subdartos pouch". The associated passage back into the inguinal canal is closed to prevent reascension. In patients with intra-abdominal maldescended testis, laparoscopy is useful to see for oneself the pelvic structures, position of the testis, and decide upon surgery (single or staged procedure).

Surgery becomes more complicated if the blood supply is not ample and elastic enough to be stretched into the scrotum. In these cases, the supply may be divided, some vessels sacrificed with the expectation of adequate collateral circulation. In the worst case, the testis must be "autotransplanted" into the scrotum, with all connecting blood vessels cut and reconnected (anastomosed).

When the testis is in the abdomen, the first stage of surgery is exploration to locate it, assess its viability, and determine the safest way to maintain or establish the blood supply. Multistage surgeries, or autotransplantation and anastomosis, are more often necessary in these situations. Just as often, intra-abdominal exploration discovers that the testis is nonexistent ("vanished"), or dysplastic and not salvageable.

The principal major complication of all types of orchiopexy is a loss of the blood supply to the testis, resulting in loss of the testis due to ischemic atrophy or fibrosis.

== Other animals ==
Cryptorchidism is seen in all domestic animals, most commonly in stallions, boars, and canines. The prevalence of this condition can vary depending on species and breed. Evidence of this condition is more likely in companion animals and swine than ruminants. The cause of this condition can vary from a combination of genetics, environment, and epigenetics.

=== Dogs ===
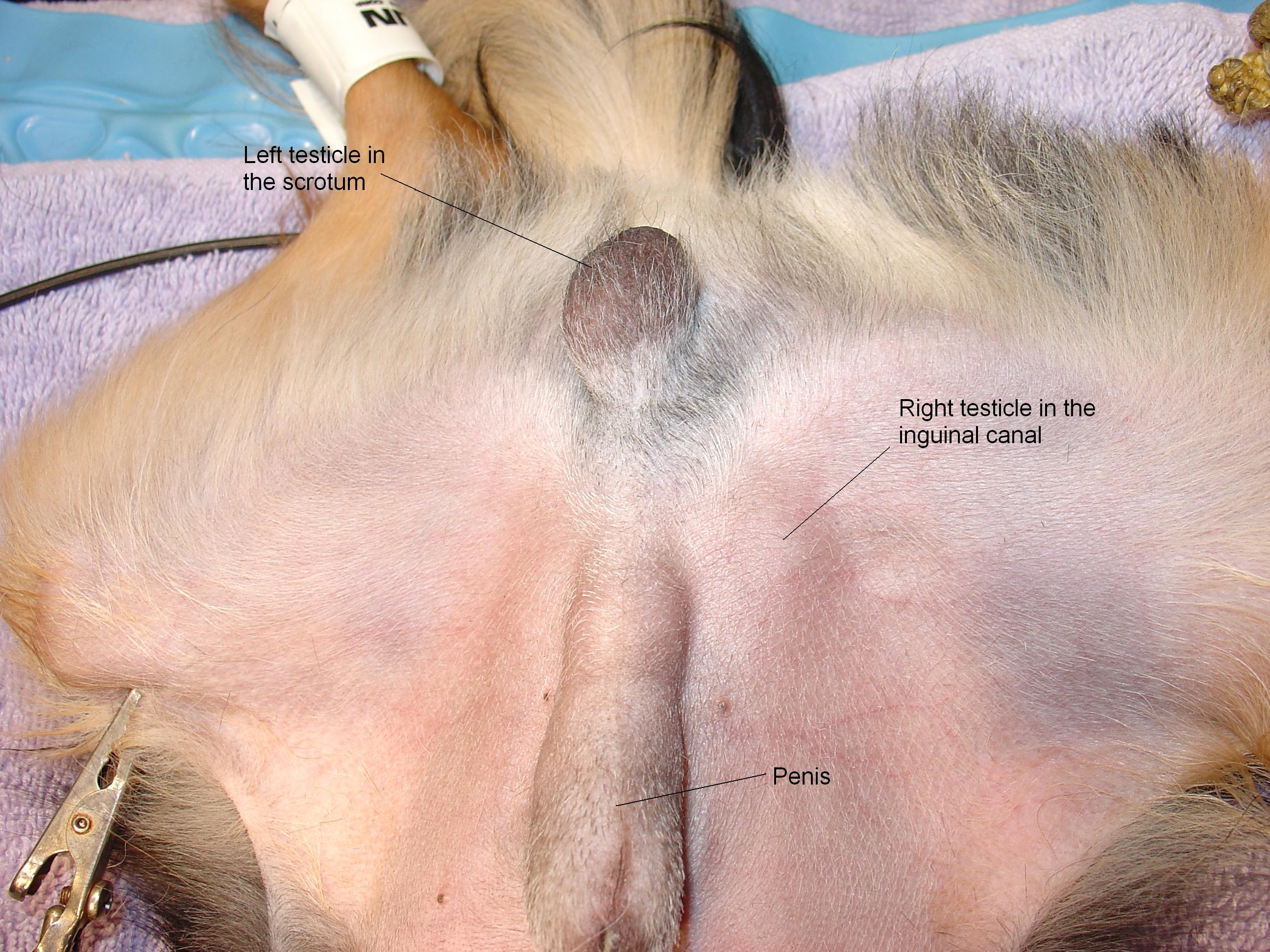
Inguinal cryptorchidism in a Chihuahua

Cryptorchidism is common in male dogs, occurring at a rate up to 10%. This condition is one of the most common congenital defects in purebred dogs (11%), with 14% reported in Siberian Huskies. Although the genetics are not fully understood, it is thought to be a recessive, and probably polygenetic, trait. Some have speculated that it is a sex-limited autosomal recessive trait; however, it is unlikely to be simple recessive. Dog testes usually descend by 10 days of age and it is considered to be cryptorchidism if they do not descend by the age of eight weeks. Cryptorchidism can be either bilateral (causing sterility) or unilateral, and inguinal or abdominal (or both). Because it is an inherited trait, affected dogs should not be bred and should be castrated. The parents should be considered carriers of the defect, and a breeder should thoughtfully consider whether to breed the carrier parent or not. Littermates may be normal, carriers, or cryptorchid. Castration of the undescended teste(s) should be considered for cryptorchid dogs due to the high rate of testicular cancer, especially Sertoli cell tumors. The incidence of testicular cancer is 13.6 times higher in dogs with abdominally retained testicles compared with normal dogs. Testicular torsion is also more likely in retained testicles. Surgical correction is by palpation of the retained testicle and subsequent exploration of the inguinal canal or abdomen, but showing altered dogs is against AKC rules, making this correction pointless for breeding stock. Orchiopexy is an option for pet dogs that will not be used for breeding.

Commonly affected breeds include:

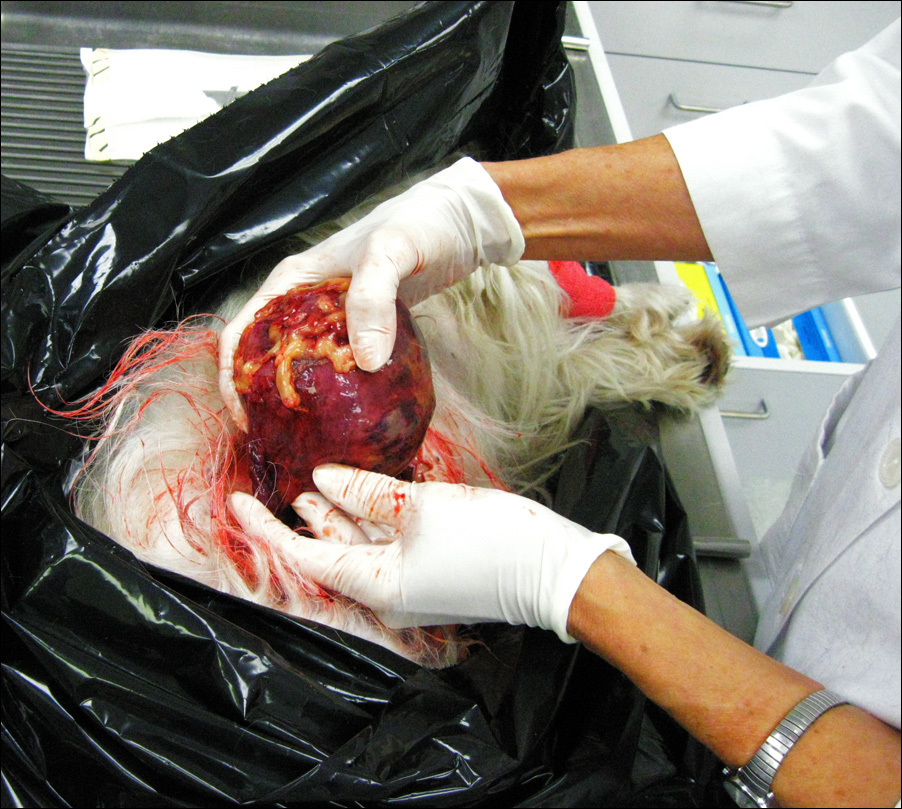
A retained testicle with cancer removed during necropsy of a dog

- Alaskan Klee Kai
- Boxer
- Chihuahua
- Dachshund (miniature)
- Bulldog
- Maltese
- Miniature Schnauzer
- Pekingese
- Pomeranian
- Poodle (toy and miniature)
- Pug
- Shetland Sheepdog
- Siberian Husky
- Whippet
- Yorkshire Terrier

=== Cats ===
Cryptorchidism is rarer in cats than it is in dogs. In one study, 1.9% of intact male cats were cryptorchid. Persians are predisposed. Normally, the testicles are in the scrotum by the age of six to eight weeks. Male cats with one cryptorchid testicle may still be fertile; however, male cats with two cryptorchid testicles are most likely to be sterile. Urine spraying is one indication that a cat with no observable testicles may not be neutered; other signs are the presence of enlarged jowls, thickened facial and neck skin, and spines on the penis (which usually regress within six weeks after castration). Most cryptorchid cats present with an inguinal testicle. Testicular tumors and testicular torsion are rare in cryptorchid cats, but castration is usually performed due to unwanted behavior such as urine spraying.

=== Horses ===
In horses, cryptorchidism is sufficiently common that affected males (ridglings) are routinely gelded.

Rarely, cryptorchidism is due to the presence of a congenital testicular tumor such as a teratoma, which has a tendency to grow large.
