= Happy Times! Sing Along with Mitch =

Studio album by Mitch Miller and The Gang
- Released: 1961
- Genre: Easy listening
- Label: Columbia

Mitch Miller and The Gang chronology
Mitch's Greatest Hits (1961)	Happy Times! Sing Along with Mitch (1961)	TV Sing Along with Mitch (1961)

Professional ratings
Review scores
Source	Rating
New Record Mirror	4/5

Happy Times! Sing Along with Mitch is an album by Mitch Miller and The Gang. It was released in 1960 on the Columbia label (catalog nos. CL-1568 and CS-8368).

The album debuted on Billboard magazine's popular albums chart on March 13, 1961, peaked at No. 5, and remained on that chart for 23 weeks. It was certified as a gold record by the RIAA.

== Track listing ==
Side 1

1. Medley: "That's My Weakness Now" and "Last Night On The Back Porch"
2. Medley: "I Love My Baby, My Baby Loves Me" and "If You Knew Susie"
3. "Indiana"
4. Medley: "Where Do You Work-A, John" and "Yes! We Have No Bananas"
5. Medley: "Collegiate" and "Alabamy Bound"
6. "The Trail of the Lonesome Pine"

Side 2

1. "My Melancholy Baby"
2. "Side by Side"
3. "Anniversary Song"
4. "Wagon Wheels"
5. "The Prisoner's Song"
6. "Beautiful Ohio"
