= Party Sing Along with Mitch =

Studio album by Mitch Miller & The Gang
- Released: 1959
- Genre: Easy listening
- Label: Columbia

Mitch Miller & The Gang chronology
| Folk Songs Sing Along with Mitch (1959) | Party Sing Along with Mitch (1959) | Fireside Sing Along with Mitch (1959) |

Party Sing Along with Mitch is an album by Mitch Miller & The Gang. It was released in 1959 on the Columbia label (catalog nos. CL-1331 and CS-8118).

The album debuted on Billboard magazine's popular albums chart on August 31, 1959, peaked at No. 7, and remained on that chart for 66 weeks. It was certified as a gold record by the RIAA. In Canada the album was No. 2 for 5 weeks and on the top 10 chart for 13 weeks.

== Track listing ==
Side 1

1. "I Love You Truly"
2. Medley: "In the Shade of the Old Apple Tree" and "In the Good Old Summertime"
3. "The Sweetest Story Ever Told"
4. "Meet Me Tonight in Dreamland"
5. "I Wonder Who's Kissing Her Now"
6. Medley: "Goodnight Ladies" and "Home Sweet Home"

Side 2

1. Medley: "My Gal Sal" and "Cuddle Up a Little Closer"
2. "Ramblin' Wreck from Georgia Tech"
3. Medley: "Bird in a Gilded Cage" and "Nellie"
4. Medley: "Oh! What a Pal Was Mary" and "Harrigan"
5. Medley: "School Days", "Sweet Rosie O'Grady", and "The Sidewalks of New York"
6. "I'll Take You Home Again, Kathleen"
