= Head, Shoulders, Knees and Toes =

Popular children's song

Song
- Released: 1912; 114 years ago
- Genre: Children's song

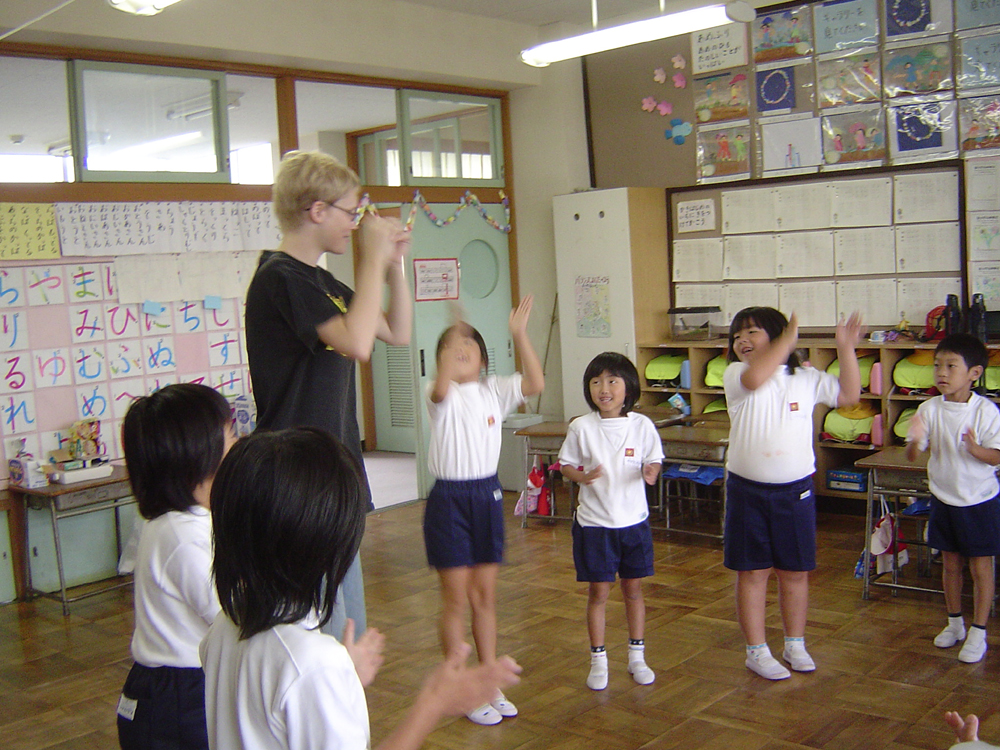
Children in a Japanese elementary school singing a similar song (2003)

The traditional gestures for the "Head, Shoulders, Knees and Toes" song demonstrated at a festival in Japan (2014)

"Head, Shoulders, Knees and Toes" is a children's song. The song was documented as early as 1912 and in 1921. It is often sung to the tune of "There Is a Tavern in the Town", but it has also been adapted to be sung to other tunes, including when translated to other languages.

== Description ==
The song typically has only one verse, with lyrics similar to those below. The second line repeats the first line both in words and in melody, the third line has a rising tone, and the fourth line repeats the first two. Children might dance while they sing the song and touch their head, shoulders, knees, and toes in sequence to the words.

== Lyrics ==
Head, shoulders, knees and toes,
knees and toes
Head, shoulders, knees and toes,
knees and toes
And eyes and ears and mouth and nose
Head, shoulders, knees and toes,
knees and toes.

The lyrics can also be sung in reverse, like this:

Toes, knees and shoulders, head,
shoulders, head
Toes, knees and shoulders, head,
shoulders, head
And nose and mouth and ears and eyes
Toes, knees and shoulders, head,
shoulders, head.

Each verse is repeated, with one word being omitted each time, while participants touch their body parts without actually saying the word. For example:

Verse 2
----, shoulders, knees and toes

Verse 3
----, ----, knees and toes

Verse 4
----, ----, ----, and toes

Verse 5
----, ----, ----, and ----

This pattern continues until all the words are omitted. The last verse consists of no actual singing or singing all lyrics, but sometimes at a much faster tempo.

== Similar songs ==
While "Head, Shoulders, Knees and Toes" and its translations are most commonly sung to the tune of "There is a Tavern in the Town", the song has been adapted to various tunes. Variants of the English lyrics are sung to "Here We Go Round the Mulberry Bush", "Frère Jacques", and "London Bridge Is Falling Down". In the Czech Republic, "Hlava, ramená, kolená, palce" is sung to the Czech folk song "Stodola Pumpa".

Many derivative songs have been constructed over the years that similarly teach the vocabulary of body parts. One example, as featured on the Kidsongs video "Boppin' with the Biggles", is as follows and is sung to the most common tune:

Feet and tummies arms and chins,
arms and chins
Feet and tummies arms and chins,
arms and chins
And eyes and ears and mouth and shins
Feet and tummies arms and chins,
arms and chins

Hands and fingers legs and lips,
legs and lips
Hands and fingers legs and lips,
legs and lips
And eyes and ears and mouth and hips
Hands and fingers legs and lips,
legs and lips

Another variation starts the line with "Eyes" and includes "chin", but it has the words in an order that causes the motions to zig zag.
