= Fireside Sing Along with Mitch =

Studio album by Mitch Miller and The Gang
- Released: 1959
- Genre: Easy listening
- Label: Columbia

Mitch Miller and The Gang chronology
Party Sing Along with Mitch (1959)	Fireside Sing Along with Mitch (1959)	Saturday Night Sing Along with Mitch (1960)

Fireside Sing Along with Mitch is an album by Mitch Miller and The Gang. It was released in 1959 on the Columbia label (catalog nos. CL-1389 and CS-8184). The album debuted on Billboard magazine's popular albums chart on January 4, 1960, peaked at No. 10, and remained on that chart for 30 weeks. In Canada the album reached No. 2 on February 8, 1960, and was in the top 10 for 12 weeks.

== Track listing ==
Side 1

1. Medley: "Polly Wolly Doodle", "Wait for the Wagon", and "The Old Grey Mare"
2. "Funiculi, Funicula"
3. Medley: "Drink to Me Only with Thine Eyes" and "Vive L'Amour"
4. "Drunk Last Night"
5. Medley: "Oh Dear, What Can the Matter Be" and "Oh Where, Oh Where Has My Little Dog Gone"
6. "My Bonnie Lies Over the Ocean"

Side 2

1. "Love's Old Sweet Song"
2. Medley: "Juanita" and "Sweet Genevieve"
3. Medley: "Believe Me if All Those Endearing Young Charms" and "In the Gloaming"
4. Medley: "Sweet and Low" and "All Through the Night"
5. "When You and I Were Young, Maggie"
6. Medley: "Annie Laurie" and "Auld Lang Syne"
