= TV Sing Along with Mitch =

Studio album by Mitch Miller and The Gang
- Released: 1961
- Genre: Easy listening
- Label: Columbia

Mitch Miller and The Gang chronology
Happy Times! Sing Along with Mitch (1961)	TV Sing Along with Mitch (1961)	Your Request Sing Along with Mitch (1961)

TV Sing Along with Mitch is an album by Mitch Miller and The Gang. It was released in 1961 on the Columbia label (catalog nos. CL-1628 and CS-8428). The album debuted on Billboard magazine's popular albums chart on June 12, 1961, peaked at No. 3, and remained on that chart for 40 weeks.

== Track listing ==
Side 1

1. Medley: "California" and "Avalon"
2. "I Found a Million Dollar Baby (In a Five and Ten Cent Store)
3. "Breezein' Along with the Breeze"
4. "Happy Days Are Here Again"
5. Medley: "Has Anybody Seen Kelly" and "I've Got Rings on My Fingers"
6. "Shuffle Off to Buffalo"

Side 2

1. Medley: "Moonlight Bay" and "There's Yes! Yes! In Your Eyes"
2. "The Love Nest"
3. "Would You Like to Take a Walk"
4. Medley: "You Must Have Been a Beautiful Baby" and "If I Could Be with You"
5. "It's Only a Paper Moon"
6. "Auf Widersehen, My Dear"
