= Comet (song) =

North American children's humorous song

"Comet" is a humorous children's song in parts of North America and other English-speaking countries. It describes the deleterious effects of consuming Comet cleanser—a powdered cleansing product. The most prominent and often-occurring effect in the song is that it turns one's teeth green. Among other effects alleged by this song are an unappealing taste and, unsurprisingly, a tendency to vomit.

Although this song, like many in its genre, has widely variable lyrics, a common version contains the following words:

Comet - it makes your teeth [or "lips", "face", "mouth", "hair"] turn green!;
Comet - it tastes like gasoline [or "kerosene" in Australia; or "Listerine", in the variation where your lips turn green]!;
Comet - it makes you vomit;
So buy [or "eat" or "get"] some Comet, and vomit, today!

The melody of the song is the "Colonel Bogey March".

== In popular culture ==
- Bart Simpson sings a version about his sister in the Simpsons episode "Stark Raving Dad".
- Byron, one of the Pike triplets, sings a variation in Baby-sitters on Board!, The Baby Sitters Club Super Special #1.

== See also ==
- "Hitler Has Only Got One Ball", another schoolyard song set to the "Colonel Bogey March" melody
