= Christmas Sing-Along with Mitch =

Christmas Sing Along with Mitch

Studio album by Mitch Miller & The Gang
- Released: 1958
- Genre: Easy listening, Christmas music
- Label: Columbia

Mitch Miller & The Gang chronology
Sing Along with Mitch (1958)	Christmas Sing Along with Mitch (1958)	More Sing Along with Mitch (1958)

Christmas Sing Along with Mitch is an album by Mitch Miller & The Gang. It was released in 1958 on the Columbia label (catalog nos. CL-1205 and CS-8027).

The album entered Billboard magazine's popular albums chart on December 29, 1958, and was No. 1 for two weeks. It returned to the chart in 1959 (No. 8), 1960 (No. 6), 1961 (No. 9) and 1962 (No. 37). It was certified as a gold record by the RIAA. In Canada the album reached No. 4 on December 28, 1959.

AllMusic later gave the album a rating of four-and-a-half stars. The reviewer David A. Milberg wrote that it "documents the MOR sound of the '50s".

Charlotte Greig, in her book 100 Best Selling Albums of the 50s, writes, "There's no Jingle Bells here. Instead, this is an entirely religious selection, one devoted to Christmas rather than Xmas. Miller would make up for that a couple of years later by recording Holiday Sing Along, with Santa songs in abundance" The latter holiday record consisted of modern vernacular carols, while this one focused on traditional songs, several of a religious nature.

== Track listing ==
Side 1

1. "Joy to the World"
2. "Hark! The Herald Angels Sing"
3. "What Child Is This"
4. "We Three Kings of Orient Are"
5. "It Came Upon a Midnight Clear"
6. "Silent Night, Holy Night"

Side 2

1. "Deck the Halls with Boughs of Holly"
2. "God Rest Ye Merry Gentlemen"
3. "O Come, All Ye Faithful (Adeste Fidelis)"
4. "The First Noel"
5. "The Coventry Carol"
6. "Away in the Manger (Luther's Carol)"
7. "O Little Town of Bethlehem"
