= Saturday Night Sing Along with Mitch =

Studio album by Mitch Miller & The Gang
- Released: 1960
- Genre: Easy listening
- Label: Columbia

Mitch Miller & The Gang chronology
Fireside Sing Along with Mitch (1959)	Saturday Night Sing Along with Mitch (1960)	Sentimental Sing Along with Mitch (1960)

Saturday Night Sing Along with Mitch is an album by Mitch Miller & The Gang. It was released in 1960 on the Columbia label (catalog nos. CL-1414 and CS-8211).

The album debuted on Billboard magazine's popular albums chart on April 4, 1960, peaked at No. 8, and remained on that chart for 40 weeks. It was certified as a gold record by the RIAA. In Canada the album was No. 1 for 4 weeks, beginning March 28, 1960, and in the top 10 for 9 weeks.

== Track listing ==
Side 1

1. "Dancing with Tears in My Eyes"
2. "Silver Moon"
3. "Bye Bye Blackbird"
4. "Poor Butterfly"
5. Medley: "Too-Ra-Loo-Ra-Loo-Ral That's An Irish Lullaby" and "Mother Machree"
6. "Now Is the Hour"

Side 2

1. "Baby Face"
2. Medley: "I Wonder What's Become of Sally?" and "Ain't She Sweet"
3. "I'm Looking Over a Four Leaf Clover"
4. Medley: "The Man on the Flying Trapeze" and "Ta-Ra-Ra-Boom-De-E"
5. "Sing Along"
6. Medley: "Little Brown Jug" and "After the Ball"
