= Gonadal agenesis =

Medical condition

Gonadal agenesis is a rare condition where an individual lacks both gonads.

If the karyotype is 46,XY and the individual otherwise has a male phenotype, it is called anorchia; this occurs in one of 20,000 male births. The corresponding condition in an individual with a female phenotype and 46,XX karyotype is called bilateral ovarian agenesis. However, gonadal agenesis is more common in people with an 46,XY karyotype.

Absence of both ovaries is much less common than absence of one ovary. Bilateral ovarian agenesis has also been reported to co-occur with MRKH syndrome and Cantú syndrome.

== See also ==
- Gonadal dysgenesis
- Hypogonadism
- Monorchism
