= Sentimental Sing Along with Mitch =

Studio album by Mitch Miller & The Gang
- Released: 1960
- Genre: Easy listening
- Label: Columbia

Mitch Miller & The Gang chronology
Saturday Night Sing Along with Mitch (1960)	Sentimental Sing Along with Mitch (1960)	March Along with Mitch (1960)

Sentimental Sing Along with Mitch is an album by Mitch Miller & The Gang. It was released in 1960 on the Columbia label (catalog nos. CL-1457 and CS-8251).

The album debuted on Billboard magazine's popular albums chart on June 27, 1960, peaked at No. 5, and remained on that chart for 32 weeks. It was certified as a gold record by the RIAA. In Canada the album reached No. 1 on August 29, 1960, and was No. 2 three other weeks.

== Track listing ==
Side 1

1. Medley: "Singin' In The Rain", "All I Do Is Dream Of You", and "Toot, Toot, Tootsie! (Goodbye)" [3:19]
2. The Gang That Sang "Heart Of My Heart" (B. Ryan) [2:32]
3. Medley: "Little Annie Rooney" and "Hello! My Baby" [2:32]
4. Medley: "Our Boys Will Shine Tonight" and "Give My Regards To Broadway" [2:13]
5. Medley: "While Strolling Through The Park One Day" and "Ida" [2:08]
6. "When The Saints Come Marching In"

Side 2

1. "Jeannine (I Dream Of Lilac Time)" (N. Shilkret, L.W. Gilbert) [2:50]
2. "Just A-Wearyin' For You" (C. Jacobs-Bond, F.L. Stanton) [3:38]
3. "I'll See You in My Dreams" (G. Kahn, I. Jones) [2:53]
4. "When I Grow Too Old To Dream" (O. Hammerstein II, S. Romberg) [2:52]
5. "Jeanie With The Light Brown Hair" (S. Foster) [4:14]
6. "Three O'Clock In The Morning" (D. Terriss, J. Robledo) [2:33]
