= The River Kwai March =

Composition by Malcolm Arnold

Mitch Miller's single for his recording of "The River Kwai March" and the "Colonel Bogey March"

"The River Kwai March" is a march composed by Malcolm Arnold in 1957. It was written as an orchestral march to accompany the "Colonel Bogey March", which is whistled by the soldiers entering the prisoner camp in the film The Bridge on the River Kwai and again near the end of the film when the bridge is formally dedicated. The Arnold march re-appears (without the "Colonel Bogey March") several times in the film and is repeated at the finale.

The two marches have been recorded together by Mitch Miller as "March from the River Kwai - Colonel Bogey". Due to this, the "Colonel Bogey March" is often mis-credited as "River Kwai March".

The Arnold march was published by Shapiro, Bernstein & Co. in a piano arrangement by Robert C. Haring. It also forms part of the orchestral concert suite made of the Arnold film score by Christopher Palmer published by Novello & Co.
