= Rowan Cruft =

British philosopher

Academic background
- Education: University of Cambridge

Academic work
- Discipline: Philosophy
- Sub-discipline: Human Rights
- Institutions: University of Stirling

Rowan Cruft is a British philosopher and a Professor in the Division of Law and Philosophy at the University of Stirling. His research focusses on moral, political, and legal philosophy, particularly the nature and justification of rights and duties.

== Career ==
Cruft joined the University of Stirling in 2002 after completing a PhD on the justification of property rights at the University of Cambridge. Between 2022 and 2025 he served as the Head of the Division of Law and Philosophy at Stirling.

He has published variously on different types of rights, including human rights and property rights, jurisprudence, and the philosophy of journalism. His 2019 book Human Rights, Ownership, and the Individual, which offers an "Addressive" account of the nature of rights, was praised by reviewers as "a valuable and original contribution to the recent philosophical literature on rights and human rights" and as "required reading for anyone doing serious work on rights and human rights."

Cruft has also spoken in Scottish Parliament and participated as an expert witness for the drafting of the Leveson Inquiry into the ethics and culture of the British press.

== Selected works ==
=== Books ===
- Cruft, Rowan; Kramer, Matthew H.; Reiff, Mark R., eds. (2011). Crime, Punishment, and Responsibility: The Jurisprudence of Anthony Duff. Oxford University Press. ISBN 9780199592814.
- Cruft, Rowan; Liao, S. Matthew; Renzo, Massimo, eds. (2015). Philosophical Foundations of Human Rights. Oxford University Press. ISBN 9780199688623.
- Cruft, Rowan (2019). Human Rights, Ownership, and the Individual. Oxford University Press. ISBN 9780198793366.

=== Journal articles ===
- "Rethinking the Post-Truth Polarisation Narrative: Social Roles and Hinge Commitments in the Plural Public Sphere." Co-written with Natalie Alana Ashton. The Political Quarterly, 4(92), 2021: 598–605
- "Journalism and Press Freedom as Human Rights." Journal of Applied Philosophy, 39(3), 2021: 359–376
- "XI–Why is it Disrespectful to Violate Rights?" Proceedings of the Aristotelian Society, 113(2), 2013: 201–224.
- "On the Non-instrumental Value of Basic Rights." Journal of Moral Philosophy, 7(4), 2010: 441–461.
- "Why Aren't Duties Rights?" The Philosophical Quarterly, 56(223), 2006: 175–192.
- "Against individualistic justifications of property rights." Utilitas, 18(2), 2006: 154–172.
- "Human Rights and Positive Duties." Ethics and International Affairs, 19(1), 2005: 29–37.
