= Sing Along with Mitch (album) =

Studio album by Mitch Miller & The Gang
- Released: 1958
- Genre: Easy listening
- Label: Columbia

Mitch Miller & The Gang chronology
Sing Along with Mitch (1958)	Christmas Sing Along with Mitch (1958)

Sing Along with Mitch is an album by Mitch Miller & The Gang. It was released in 1958 on the Columbia label (catalog no. CL-1160, Stereo Fidelity CS-8004).

The album debuted on Billboard magazine's popular albums chart on July 14, 1958, held the No. 1 spot for eight weeks, and remained on that chart for 128 weeks. It was certified as a gold record by the RIAA. In Canada the album was ranked at #2 for 2 weeks on the April 1959 CHUM Charts.

AllMusic later gave the album a rating of three-and-a-half stars. Reviewer Bruce Eder wrote that "while it is easy to scoff at this kind of music 50 years on, one should also remember that Sing Along with Mitch was one of the bigger selling albums in the Columbia Records library, staying in print for decades."

== Track listing ==
Side 1

1. "That Old Gang of Mine," (B. Rose, M. Dixon, R. Henderson)
2. "Down By The Old Mill Stream" (Taylor)
3. "By the Light of the Silvery Moon" (Madden, G. Edwards)
4. "You Are My Sunshine" (C. Mitchell, J. Davis)
5. "Till We Meet Again" (Egan, R. A. Whiting)
6. "Let The Rest Of The World Go By" (E. R. Ball, Brennan)

Side 2

1. "Sweet Violets" (C. Grean, Coben)
2. Medley: "I've Got Sixpence"; "I've Been Working On The Railroad"; "That's Where My Money Goes"
3. "She Wore A Yellow Ribbon" (Lennie Carroll)
4. "Don't Fence Me In" (Cole Porter, Robert (Bob) Fletcher)
5. Medley: "There is a Tavern in the Town" (traditional); "Show Me The Way To Go Home" (Jimmy Campbell and Reg Connelly)
6. Medley: "Bell Bottom Trousers" (Moe Jaffe); "Be Kind To Your Web-Footed Friends" (traditional)
