= Folk Songs Sing Along with Mitch =

Studio album by Mitch Miller & The Gang
- Released: 1959
- Genre: Easy listening
- Label: Columbia

Mitch Miller & The Gang chronology
Still More! Sing Along with Mitch (1959)	Folk Songs Sing Along with Mitch (1959)	Party Sing Along with Mitch (1959)

Folk Song Sing Along with Mitch is an album by Mitch Miller & The Gang. It was released in 1959 on the Columbia label (catalog no. CS-8118).

The album debuted on Billboard magazine's popular albums chart on June 15, 1959, peaked at No. 11, and remained on that chart for 31 weeks. It was certified as a gold record by the RIAA. In Canada the album was No. 1 for 6 non-consecutive weeks beginning July 6, 1959, and was on the top 10 chart for 17 weeks.

== Track listing ==
Side 1

1. "On Top Of Old Smoky" (Pete Seeger)
2. "Red River Valley" (Lennie Carroll)
3. "Down In The Valley" (Albert Stanton, Jessie Cavanaugh)
4. "My Darling Clementine" (Albert Stanton, Jessie Cavanaugh)
5. "Aunt Rhody" (Paul Campbell)
6. "Goodnight, Irene" (Huddie Leadbetter, John Lomax)

Side 2

1. "Listen To The Mocking Bird" (arranged by Lennie Carroll)
2. "Billy Boy" / "The Bear Went Over The Mountain" (arranged by Lennie Carroll)
3. The Blue Tail Fly" (arranged by Lennie Carroll)
4. Medley: "Pop! Goes The Weasel" / "Skip To My Lou" (arranged by Lennie Carroll)
5. Medley: "Camptown Races" / "Oh Susanna!" (arranged by Lennie Carroll)
6. "When Johnny Comes Marching Home" (arranged by Lennie Carroll)
