= Still More! Sing Along with Mitch =

Studio album by Mitch Miller & The Gang
- Released: 1959
- Genre: Easy listening
- Label: Columbia

Mitch Miller & The Gang chronology
| More Sing Along with Mitch (1958) | Still More! Sing Along with Mitch (1959) | Folk Songs Sing Along with Mitch (1959) |

Still More! Sing Along with Mitch is an album by Mitch Miller & The Gang. It was released in 1959 on the Columbia label (catalog no. CL-1283).

The album debuted on Billboard magazine's popular albums chart on March 23, 1959, peaked at No. 4, and remained on that chart for 71 weeks. It was certified as a gold record by the RIAA. In Canada the album was No. 1 for 11 non-consecutive weeks and was on the top 10 list from the first album chart on April 13th to September 7th.

== Track listing ==
Side 1

1. "In a Shanty in Old Shanty Town"
2. "Smiles"
3. "I'll Be with You in Apple Blossom Time"
4. "Memories"
5. "When Day Is Gone"
6. "Good Night Sweetheart"

Side 2

1. "Tiptoe Through the Tulips with Me"
2. Medley: "A Bicycle Built for Two"; "Put on Your Old Grey Bonnet", and "I'm Just Wild About Mary (I'm Just Wild About Harry)"
3. Medley: "The Band Played On" and "Oh! You Beautiful Doll"
4. Medley: "Hinky Dinky Parlez-Vous" and "She'll Be Coming 'Round the Mountain"
5. "Beer Barrel Polka"
6. Medley: "When You Were Sweet Sixteen" and "Silver Threads Among the Gold"
