= Colonel Bogey March =

Popular march that was written in 1914 by Lieutenant F. J. Ricketts

- March by F. J. Ricketts
- Composed: 1914
- Published: 1916 by Hawkes & Son

Audio sample
- The "Colonel Bogey March", by Kenneth J. Alford, performed by the United States Navy Band: file; help

The "Colonel Bogey March" is a British march composed in 1914 by Lieutenant Kenneth J. Alford (1881–1945), a British Army bandmaster who later became the Director of Music of the Royal Marines at Plymouth. The melody is often whistled. During the Second World War, British soldiers sang the lyrics "Hitler Has Only Got One Ball" to accompany the tune.

The march first appeared in film in 1938 when it was hummed by Michael Redgrave in Alfred Hitchcock's The Lady Vanishes. For David Lean's 1957 film The Bridge on the River Kwai, set during World War II, English composer Malcolm Arnold added an orchestral march, which he titled "The River Kwai March", to accompany the Colonel Bogey march. Empire magazine included the melody in its list of 25 of Cinema's Catchiest Earworms.

== History ==
"Colonel Bogey March" sheet music by Kenneth J. Alford

In 1914, at a time in which service personnel were encouraged not to have professional lives outside the armed forces, British Army bandmaster F. J. Ricketts published "Colonel Bogey" and his other compositions under the pseudonym Kenneth J. Alford. One supposition is that the tune was inspired by a British military officer who "preferred to whistle a descending minor third" rather than shout "Fore!" when playing golf. It is this descending interval that begins each line of the melody.

The name "Colonel Bogey" was adopted by golfers in the late 19th century as an imaginary "standard opponent" in assessing a player's performance. By Edwardian times Colonel Bogey had been adopted as the presiding spirit of the course. Edwardian golfers on both sides of the Atlantic often played matches against "Colonel Bogey". Bogey is now a golfing term meaning "one over par".

== Legacy ==
At the start of World War II, "Colonel Bogey" became a British institution when a popular song was set to the tune: "Hitler Has Only Got One Ball" (originally "Göring Has Only Got One Ball" after the Luftwaffe leader suffered a ballistic groin injury).

In 1951, during the first computer conference held in Australia, the "Colonel Bogey March" was the first music played by a computer, by CSIRAC, a computer developed by the Commonwealth Scientific and Industrial Research Organisation.

The march first appeared in the film No Lady (1931), then it was hummed by Michael Redgrave (playing the cad Gilbert in his film debut) in Alfred Hitchcock's The Lady Vanishes in 1938.

The 1957 David Lean epic film The Bridge on the River Kwai popularized "The River Kwai March", an orchestral march to accompany the Colonel Bogey March.

In the 1961 film The Parent Trap, the campers at an all-girls summer camp whistle the "Colonel Bogey March" as they march through camp, mirroring the scene from The Bridge on the River Kwai.

In episode 28 of The Benny Hill Show from 1976, the march was used in the Sale of the Half-Century game show sketch during a Name That Tune-style question. One of the contestants' answers was "After the Ball" after which the host (Benny Hill) responded with, "well, you're sort of half-right" referring to the anti-Hitler slur.

In Doctor Who, the fourth incarnation of the Time Lord whistled the tune in The Face of Evil, The Talons of Weng-Chiang, The Invasion of Time and Destiny of the Daleks. Brigadier Lethbridge-Stewart also whistled it in The Mind of Evil.

In the 1985 film The Breakfast Club, all the teenage main characters are whistling the tune during their Saturday detention when Principal Vernon (played by Paul Gleason) walks into the room. It was also used in Caveman, Short Circuit and Spaceballs.

In The Simpsons episode "Stark Raving Dad", Bart initially writes a verse to a birthday song for Lisa to the tune of "Colonel Bogey March" albeit with jokey lyrics.

In The Fresh Prince of Bel-Air episode "I Know Why the Caged Bird Screams", the fictional ULA Peacocks have a fight song to the tune of the "Colonel Bogey March".

In 1995, Friends episode 18 of season 1 "The One with All the Poker", the main characters whistle the tune while stuffing envelopes with copies of Rachel's resume, which contained a hilarious typo describing her "compuper skills".

In 2019, the Colonel Bogey March was used in the TV series The Man in the High Castle, in episode 8 of season 4. The song was featured in episode 5 of season 6 of Outlander, revealing a returning character from season 5. The song also continued through the credits. The Colonel Bogey March was used in the 2024 neo-noir television series Monsieur Spade from AMC and Canal+. Perhaps coincidentally, the main character, Sam Spade, was previously played by Humphrey Bogart, often called "Bogie".

At the end of the ChuckleVision episode On the Hoof, Paul and Barry have to put on a marching band for a pompous government minister at an MI7 camp only for it to go awry. The latter brother plays the tune on a kazoo while the former just hits a tambourine.

The march has been used in German commercials for Underberg digestif bitter since the 1970s, and has become a classic jingle there. A parody titled "Comet" is a humorous song about the ill effects of consuming the cleaning product of the same name. In Indonesia this march became the jingle tune for a medicine brand called Bodrex.

== The Bridge on the River Kwai ==
English composer Malcolm Arnold added a counter-march, which he titled "The River Kwai March", for the 1957 dramatic film The Bridge on the River Kwai, set during World War II. The two marches were recorded together by Mitch Miller as "March from the River Kwai – Colonel Bogey" and it reached #20 in the US in 1958. The Arnold march forms part of the orchestral concert suite made of the Arnold film score by Christopher Palmer published by Novello & Co in London.

On account of the movie, the "Colonel Bogey March" is often miscredited as the "River Kwai March". While Arnold did use "Colonel Bogey" in his score for the movie, it was only the first theme and a bit of the second theme of "Colonel Bogey", whistled unaccompanied by the British prisoners several times as they marched into the prison camp. The British actor Percy Herbert, who appeared in The Bridge on the River Kwai, suggested the use of the song in the movie. According to Kevin Brownlow's interviews with the film's director David Lean, it was actually Lean who knew of the song and fought during the screenwriting process to have it whistled by the troops. He realized it had to be whistled rather than sung because the World War II-era lyrics (see "Hitler Has Only Got One Ball") were racy and would not get past the censors. Percy Herbert was used as a consultant on the film because he had first-hand experience of Japanese POW camps; he was paid an extra £5 per week by Lean.

Since the movie depicted prisoners of war held under inhumane conditions by the Japanese, Canadian officials were embarrassed in May 1980, when a military band played "Colonel Bogey" during a visit to Ottawa by Japanese prime minister Masayoshi Ōhira.

== Jewel Thief (1967) ==
S. D. Burman used this composition in the 1967 film Jewel Thief. The opening lines of "Yeh Dil Na Hota Bechaara" draw inspiration from the marching song.

== See also ==
- Comet (song)
