= Unilateral ovarian agenesis =

Rare condition of having one ovary

Unilateral ovarian agenesis, also known as unilateral ovarian absence (UOA), is a rare condition in an individual has one ovary instead of two not explained by previous ovariectomy. Possible causes include torsion or vascular obstruction leading to loss of one ovary, and true agenesis where the ovary never formed during development. It is much more common than having no functional ovaries (XX gonadal dysgenesis). Based on two cases reported at a Malaysian institution that performed 22,483 gynecological and obstetric surgeries, the prevalence has been estimated as 1 in 11,241. A 2023 review suggests that this is likely an underestimate since UOA is often asymptomatic and reported as an incidental finding in laparoscopic surgeries. Fertility is probably minimally affected by the condition, if at all.
