= Mitch Miller =

American record producer and musician (1911–2010)

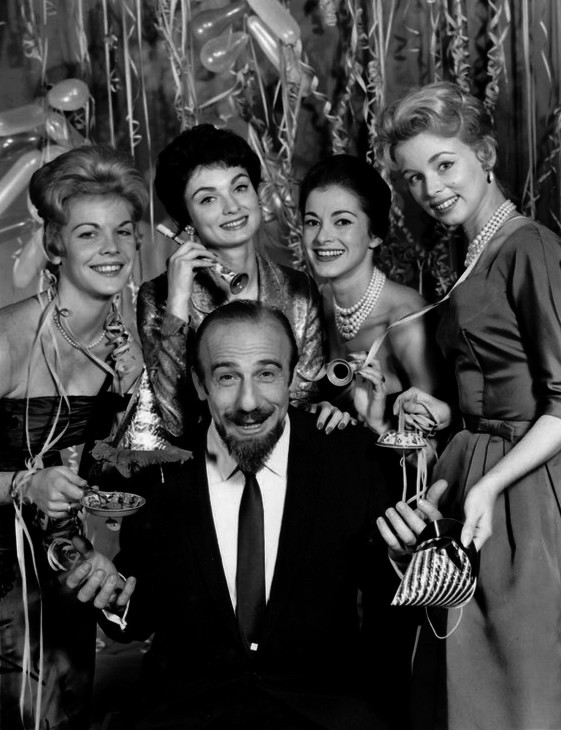
- Miller (center) in December 1961

Background information
- Born: Mitchell William Miller; July 4, 1911; Rochester, New York, U.S.
- Died: July 31, 2010 (aged 99) New York City, U.S.
- Genres: Choral; traditional pop
- Occupations: Musician; singer; conductor; record producer; record company executive
- Instruments: English horn; oboe; vocals
- Years active: 1928–2005
- Labels: Mercury; Columbia; Golden; Decca

Mitchell William Miller (July 4, 1911 – July 31, 2010) was an American choral conductor, record producer, record-industry executive, and professional oboist. He was involved in almost all aspects of the industry, particularly as a conductor and artists and repertoire (A&R) man. Miller was one of the most influential people in American popular music during the 1950s and early 1960s, both as the head of A&R at Columbia Records and as a best-selling recording artist with an NBC television series, Sing Along with Mitch. A graduate of the Eastman School of Music of the University of Rochester in the early 1930s, Miller began his musical career as a player of the oboe and English horn, making numerous highly regarded classical and popular recordings. His albums were #1 for 22 weeks in Canada between 1959 and 1962.

== Early life ==
Mitchell William Miller was born to a Jewish family in Rochester, New York, on July 4, 1911. His mother was Hinda (Rosenblum) Miller, a former seamstress, and his father, Abram Calmen Miller, a Russian-Jewish immigrant wrought-iron worker. Mitch had four siblings, two of whom, Leon and Joseph, survived him. He attended East High School.

== Career ==
=== Classical and jazz oboe ===
Miller took up the oboe at first as a teenager, because it was the only instrument available when he went to audition for his junior high school orchestra. He would receive a scholarship to study the instrument at the Hochstein School of Music & Dance. After graduating from East High School, he attended the Eastman School of Music in Rochester, where he met and became a lifelong friend of Goddard Lieberson, who became president of CBS Music Group in 1956.

After graduating from Eastman, Miller played with the Rochester Philharmonic Orchestra and then moved to New York City, where he was a member of the Alec Wilder Octet (1938–41 and occasionally later), as well as performing with David Mannes, Andre Kostelanetz, Percy Faith, George Gershwin, and Charlie Parker. He worked with Frank Sinatra on the 1946 recording Frank Sinatra Conducts the Music of Alec Wilder.

Miller played the English horn part in the Largo movement of Dvořák's New World Symphony in a 1947 recording conducted by Leopold Stokowski. In 1948, he performed Mozart's Oboe Concerto in C major with the CBS Symphony Orchestra conducted by Alfredo Antonini in a broadcast for Voice of America.

Miller gave the American premiere of Richard Strauss's Oboe Concerto in a 1948 radio broadcast. Strauss had originally assigned rights to the premiere to John de Lancie, who gave him the idea for the concerto while stationed near Strauss's villa in Garmisch. However, since meeting the composer, de Lancie had won a section oboist position with the Philadelphia Orchestra, and as a junior player to the orchestra's principal oboist, Marcel Tabuteau, was unable to fulfill Strauss's wishes. De Lancie then gave the rights for the premiere to Miller.

As part of the CBS Symphony, Miller participated in the musical accompaniment on the 1938 radio broadcast of Orson Welles's The Mercury Theater on the Air production of The War of the Worlds. He also performed in Beethoven's Symphony No. 5 in C minor.

=== A&R man ===
Miller joined Mercury Records as a classical music producer and served as the head of artists and repertoire (A&R) at the label in the late 1940s, then joining Columbia Records in the same capacity in 1950. This was a pivotal position in a recording company, because the A&R executive decided which musicians and songs would be recorded and promoted by that particular record label.

He defined the Columbia style through the early 1960s, signing and producing many important pop standards artists for Columbia, including Johnnie Ray, Percy Faith, Ray Conniff, Jimmy Boyd, Johnny Mathis, Tony Bennett, and Guy Mitchell (whose pseudonym was based on Miller's first name).

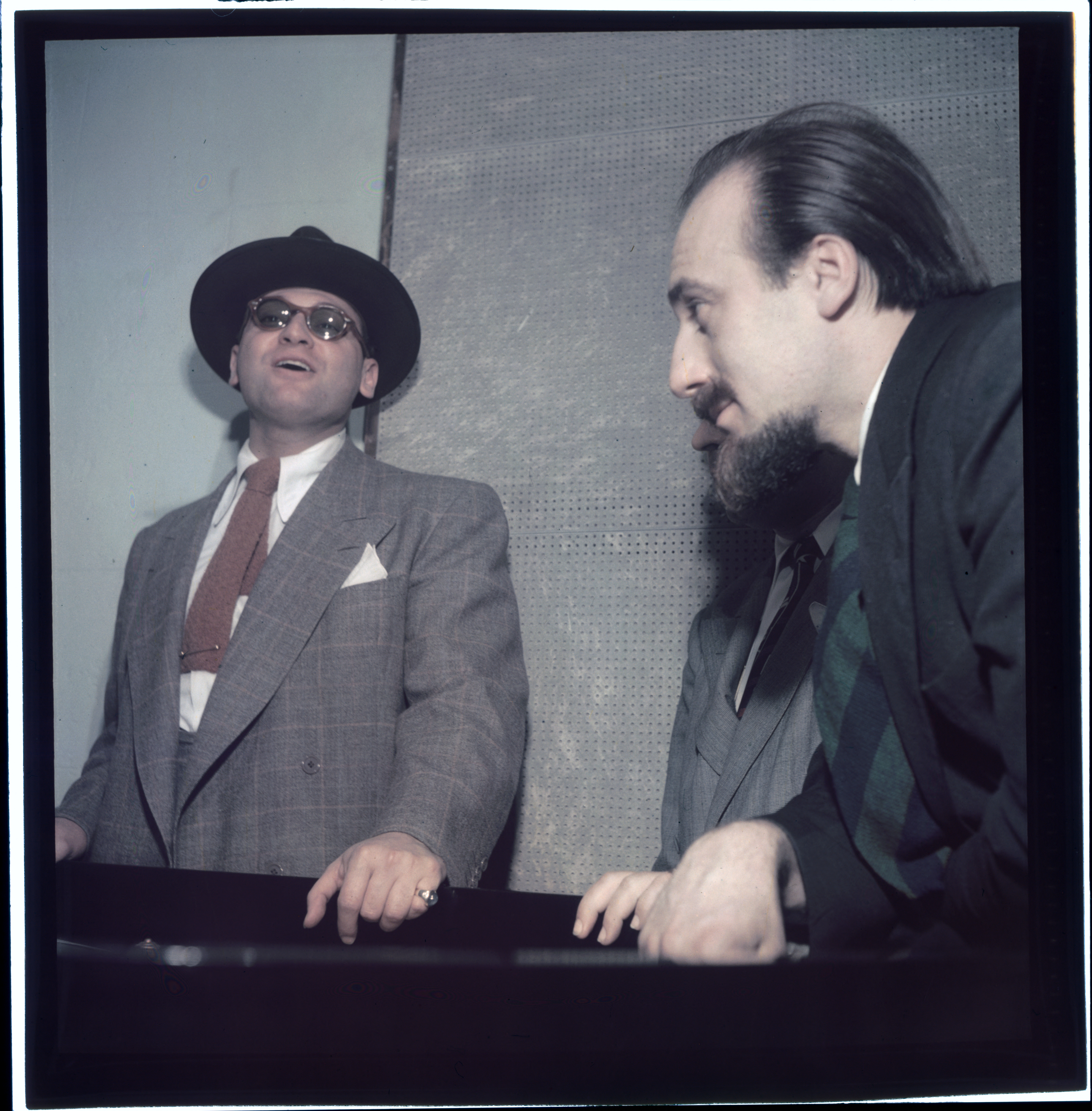
Miller (right) with Frankie Laine, c. 1947

After arriving at Columbia, Miller enticed Frankie Laine to join the label after his early successes at Mercury. Miller helped direct the careers of artists who were already signed to the label, such as Doris Day, Dinah Shore, and Jo Stafford. Miller also discovered Aretha Franklin and signed her to the first major recording contract of her career. She left Columbia after five years, when Ahmet Ertegun of Atlantic Records promised her artistic freedom to create records outside the pop mainstream in a more rhythm-and-blues-driven direction.

Mitch Miller disapproved of rock 'n' roll—one of his contemporaries described his denunciation of it as "The Gettysburg Address of Music"—and passed not only on Elvis Presley and Buddy Holly, who became stars on RCA and Coral, respectively, but on The Beatles as well, creating a fortune in revenue for rival Capitol. Previously, Miller had offered Presley a contract but balked at the amount Presley's manager, Colonel Tom Parker, was asking. However, in 1958 he signed Johnny Cash and Carl Perkins, two of Presley's contemporaries at Sun Records.

According to former Newsweek music critic Karen Schoemer, Miller's refusal to record in the genre was also due to his fear that the label, and its corporate parent CBS, would be implicated in the scandal surrounding payola if he did so, remarking:

"I knew what was going on—everybody in the business knew what was going on. You had to pay to play."

In defense of his anti-rock stance, he once told NME in January 1958:

"Rock 'n' roll is musical baby food: it is the worship of mediocrity, brought about by a passion for conformity."

Despite his distaste for rock 'n' roll, Miller emphasized emotional expression over vocal perfection and often produced records for Columbia artists that were rockish in nature. Two examples are "A White Sport Coat (and a Pink Carnation)" by Marty Robbins and "Rock-a-Billy" by Guy Mitchell.

=== Record producer ===
As a record producer, Miller gained a reputation for both innovation and gimmickry. Although he oversaw dozens of chart hits, his relentlessly cheery arrangements and his penchant for novelty material—for example, "Come On-a My House" (Rosemary Clooney), "Mama Will Bark" (Frank Sinatra and Dagmar)—have drawn criticism from some admirers of traditional pop music. Music historian Will Friedwald wrote in his book Jazz Singing that

Miller exemplified the worst in American pop. He first aroused the ire of intelligent listeners by trying to turn—and darn near succeeding in turning—great artists like Sinatra, Clooney, and Tony Bennett into hacks. Miller chose the worst songs and put together the worst backings imaginable—not with the hit-or-miss attitude that bad musicians traditionally used, but with insight, forethought, careful planning, and perverted brilliance.

At the same time, Friedwald acknowledges Miller's great influence on later popular music production:

Miller established the primacy of the producer, proving that even more than the artist, the accompaniment, or the material, it was the responsibility of the man in the recording booth whether a record flew or flopped. Miller also conceived the idea of the pop record "sound" per se: not so much an arrangement or a tune, but an aural texture (usually replete with extramusical gimmicks) that could be created in the studio and then replicated in live performance, instead of the other way around. Miller was hardly a rock 'n' roller, yet without these ideas there could never have been rock 'n' roll. "Mule Train", Miller's first major hit (for Frankie Laine) and the foundation of his career, set the pattern for virtually the entire first decade of rock. The similarities between it and, say, "Leader of the Pack", need hardly be outlined here.

While some of Columbia's performers, including Harry James, Frank Sinatra, and Rosemary Clooney, resented Miller's methods, the label maintained a high release-to-hit ratio during the 1950s. Sinatra particularly blamed his temporary fall from popularity while at Columbia on Miller; the crooner felt that he was forced by Miller to record material like "Mama Will Bark" and "The Hucklebuck". Miller countered that Sinatra's contract gave him the right to refuse any song.

=== Recording artist ===
Miller's single for his 1957 recording of "The River Kwai March" and "Colonel Bogey March"

In the early 1950s, Miller recorded with Columbia's house band as "Mitchell Miller and His Orchestra". He also recorded a string of successful albums and singles, featuring a male chorale and his own arrangements, under the name "Mitch Miller and the Gang" beginning in 1950. The ensemble's hits included "The Children's Marching Song" (more commonly known as "This Old Man"), "Tzena, Tzena, Tzena", and "The Yellow Rose of Texas", which topped the U.S. Billboard chart, sold over one million copies in the United States alone, and reached No. 2 on the UK singles chart. Miller's medley of the two marches from The Bridge on the River Kwai, "The River Kwai March" and "Colonel Bogey March", lasted 29 weeks on the Billboard pop charts in 1958, longer than any other record completely within that year.

In 1957, Miller's orchestra and chorus recorded "U.S. Air Force Blue", a United States Air Force recruiting song. He and his orchestra also recorded children's music for the Golden Records label. A choral group called The Sandpiper Singers provided the vocals for these recordings, including an album of Mother Goose nursery rhymes.

In 1961, Miller also provided two choral tracks set to Dimitri Tiomkin's title music on the soundtrack to The Guns of Navarone. Following this was the theme of The Longest Day over the end credits in 1962 and the "Major Dundee March", the theme song to Sam Peckinpah's 1965 Major Dundee. Though the film was a boxoffice bomb, the song remained popular for years.

In 1987, Miller conducted the London Symphony Orchestra with pianist David Golub in a well-received recording of Gershwin's An American in Paris, Concerto in F, and Rhapsody in Blue. What made this recording special was that it was produced using the original sheet music that was handed out by Gershwin to his band for an early U.S. tour, along with Gershwin's performance directions as noted by then band member Miller.

=== Sing Along with Mitch ===
Initially airing as a one-shot episode of the NBC television show Startime (season 1, episode 32) on May 24, 1960, Sing Along with Mitch went on to become a weekly series in 1961 as a community sing-along program hosted by Mitch Miller and featuring a male chorus. The program, videotaped in New York, was basically an extension of Miller's series of Columbia Sing Along with Mitch record albums. In keeping with the show's title, viewers were presented with lyrics at the bottom of the television screen at the beginning and ending of each episode. While many insist there was a bouncing ball to keep time, Miller correctly said this was something they remembered from movie theater Screen Songs and Song Car-Tunes sing-along cartoons.

Each weekly episode concluded with the same abruptly-ending nonsense choral song, to the tune of "The Stars and Stripes Forever":

Be kind to your web-footed friends,
For a duck may be somebody's mother.
Be kind to your friends in the swamp,
Where the weather is very, very damp.
Now, you may think that this is the end,
Well, it is!

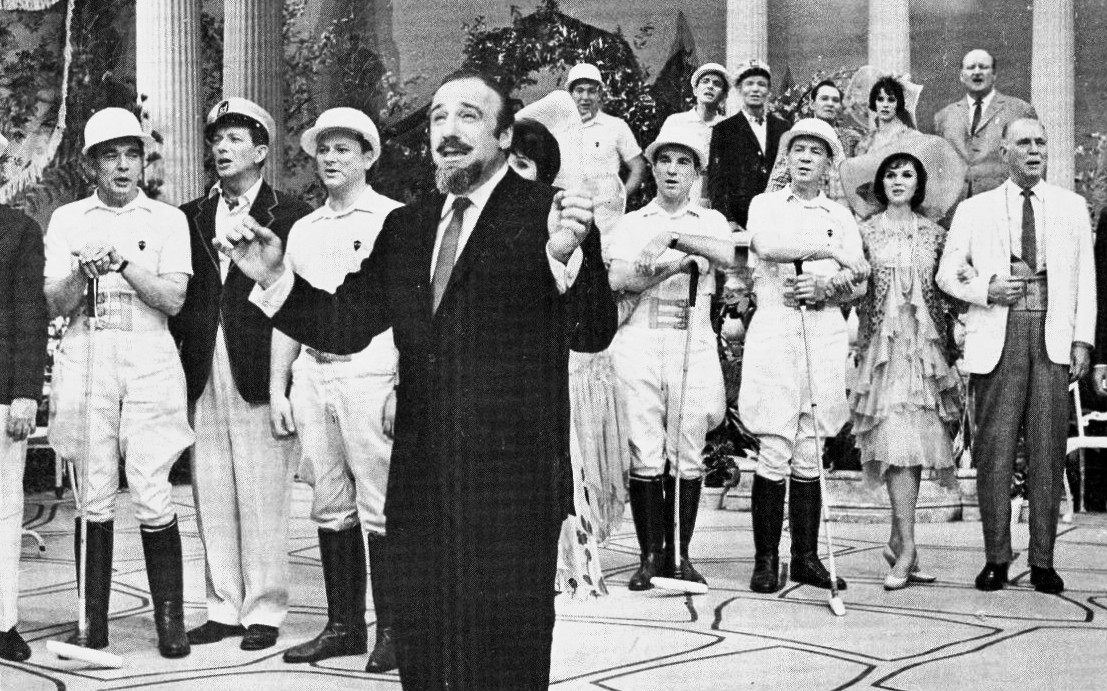
Miller leading his Sing Along Gang on Sing Along with Mitch, c. 1963

Singer Leslie Uggams, pianist Dick Hyman, accordionist Dominic Cortese, and the singing Quinto Sisters were regularly featured on Sing Along with Mitch. One of the tenors in Miller's chorale, Bob McGrath, later went on to a long and successful career on the PBS children's show Sesame Street (he was a founding member of the "human" cast in 1969 and became its longest-serving cast member until his enforced retirement in 2016).

Sing Along with Mitch occasionally featured celebrity guests who would appear throughout the hour and whose repertoire would be worked into the episode's list of songs: George Burns, Milton Berle, and Shirley Temple among them. The show also offered cameos by uncredited celebrities not necessarily known for their singing ability, who were either visiting or working in New York. These surprise guests were dressed like the male chorus members and hidden among them for the closing sing-along, including Johnny Carson, Jerry Lewis, Wally Cox, Buddy Hackett, and Joe E. Ross (in his police uniform from the sitcom Car 54, Where Are You?).

As the popularity of the TV show rose, Miller continued to produce and record several "Sing Along with Mitch" record albums, complete with tear-out lyric sheets. The album series ultimately comprised 20 titles, released from 1958 to 1963. Because the album was intended as a sing-a-long, the singing on the album was metronomic, with each syllable landing on the beat. This was intended to guide the sing-a-long-ers as they sang.

Sing Along with Mitch ran on television from 1961 until the network canceled it in 1964, a victim of changing musical tastes. Selected repeats aired briefly on NBC during the spring of 1966. The show's primary audience was over the age of 40 and it did not gain the favor of advertisers targeting the youth market. Miller's lawyers continued to defend his Sing-Along trademark for years, even down to the level of a small community theater advertising a sing-along Mikado in 1997.

Miller left Columbia Records in 1965 and joined MCA Inc. as a consultant, signing the same year with MCA's Decca Records subsidiary.

In later years, Miller carried on the sing-along tradition, leading crowds in song in personal appearances. For several years, Miller was featured in a popular series of Christmas festivities in New Bedford, Massachusetts, leading large crowds singing carols. Miller hosted a 1981 TV reunion of the Sing Along Gang for NBC (featuring veterans from the original gang, including Bob McGrath, Andy Love, Paul Friesen, Victor Griffin, and Dominic Cortese). Miller also appeared as host of two PBS television specials, Keep America Singing (1994) and Voices In Harmony (1996), featuring champion quartets and choruses of the Society for the Preservation and Encouragement of Barber Shop Quartet Singing in America (Note: Although SPEBSQSA retains its full name for legal purposes, it's now known as its alternate name, Barbershop Harmony Society.) and Sweet Adelines International. He also appeared conducting regional orchestras and filled in many times as guest conductor of the Boston Pops orchestra.

=== Conducting style, and parodies ===
At his first rehearsal for television, Miller took his position in front of the chorus and began conducting in the usual choirmaster manner: arms outstretched with hands gesturing, so the singers could see his signals. The TV director stopped him, objecting that Miller's arms were out of the camera's range and could not be seen on the television screen. Miller pulled his arms closer to his body, but the director stopped him once more. It was not until Miller's elbows were almost touching his body, and his arms extremely restricted, that the director was satisfied. Miller dutifully adopted the jerky, confined style of conducting and kept it for the duration of the series.

The rigid format of Sing Along with Mitch lent itself to parodies. Steve Allen once performed a pointed satire, with the comedian made up as Miller and robotically bending his arms à la Miller while conducting. The sketch spoofed the show's production values, including cameras panning among the vocalists, going out of control and knocking them over, then chasing Allen out of the studio and onto the roof. Ross Bagdasarian produced an animated spoof in a segment of The Alvin Show, with the David Seville character conducting Alvin and the Chipmunks in Miller's herky-jerky style, singing "Down in the Valley" while scrambled lyrics appeared on-screen. Stan Freberg, who had previously recorded "Wunnerful! Wunnerful!", a scathing satire of The Lawrence Welk Show, presented an equally brutal satire of the show, "Sing Along with Freeb", on his February 1962 ABC special, The Chun King Chow Mein Hour. Jonathan and Darlene Edwards (Paul Weston and Jo Stafford) produced an entire album (Sing Along with Jonathan and Darlene Edwards, 1962) of sing-along in the Miller style but deliberately off-key, which supposedly greatly angered Miller. On the cartoon series The Flintstones, Fred and Barney appeared on the "Hum Along with Herman" show (for people who do not know the words), another satire of Miller's show. Bigtop Records in 1963 released a record by The Dellwoods and under the aegis of Mad, titled Fink Along with Mad.

== Personal life and death ==
Miller was married for 65 years to the former Frances Alexander, who died in 2000. They had two daughters, a son, two grandchildren, and two great-grandchildren. His son, Mitchell "Mike" Miller Jr., is a children's book illustrator.

Miller lived in New York City for many years, where he died from a short illness on July 31, 2010, at the age of 99.

== Discography ==
=== Singles ===
Year	Title	Charts		
Year	Title	US	Canada	UK
1950	"Tzena, Tzena, Tzena"	3		
1955	"The Yellow Rose of Texas"	1		2
1956	"Song for a Summer Night"	8		
1956	"Willie Can"	30		
1958	"March from the River Kwai" and "Colonel Bogey"" (medley) / "Hey Little Baby"	20	15 / 36	
1959	"The Children's Marching Song" (also known as "This Old Man" or "Nick Nack Paddy Whack")	16	2	
1959	"Holiday for Lovers / This Here Goat"		38	
1959	"When Johnny Comes Marching Home"			
1960	"Do-Re-Mi"		13	

=== Albums ===
As "Mitch Miller and the Gang":

- Sing Along with Mitch (Columbia, 1958)
- Christmas Sing-Along with Mitch (Columbia, 1958) (Billboard: Best-selling Christmas album, 1958, 1959, 1960)
- More Sing Along with Mitch (Columbia, 1958)
- Still More! Sing Along with Mitch (Columbia, 1959)
- Folk Songs Sing Along with Mitch (Columbia, 1959)
- Party Sing Along with Mitch (Columbia, 1959)
- Fireside Sing Along with Mitch (Columbia, 1959)
- Saturday Night Sing Along with Mitch (Columbia, 1960)
- Sentimental Sing Along with Mitch (Columbia, 1960)
- March Along with Mitch (Columbia, 1960)
- Memories Sing Along with Mitch (Columbia, 1960)
- Mitch's Greatest Hits (Columbia, 1961)
- Happy Times! Sing Along with Mitch (Columbia, 1961)
- TV Sing Along with Mitch (Columbia, 1961)
- Your Request Sing Along with Mitch (Columbia, 1961)
- Holiday Sing Along with Mitch (Columbia, 1961)
- Rhythm Sing Along with Mitch (Columbia, 1962)
- Peace Sing Along (Atlantic, 1970)

As "Mitch Miller and the Sing Along Chorus":

- Golden Harvest Sing Along (Columbia, 1961)

== Awards and honors ==
- Miller received the Grammy Lifetime Achievement Award in 2000.
- He was awarded an honorary membership to the Barbershop Harmony Society in 1985.
- He was inducted into the Rochester Music Hall of Fame in 2013.
