= Caudal cell mass =

In humans and other mammals, the caudal cell mass (also tail bud or caudal eminence in humans) is the aggregate of undifferentiated cells at the caudal end on the spine. The caudal end of the spinal cord first begins to form after primary neurulation has taken place, indicating that it develops after the cranial portion of the spinal cord has developed. Following neurulation, the caudal tail begins to form a neurocoele as it develops a hollow core. After this, secondary neurulation occurs in which the medullary cord begins to form and is filled with many cavities that ultimately form the lumen. The cavities formed from the initial and secondary neurulation combine to form one uninterrupted cavity. There is still speculation on the formation of the caudal cell mass in humans with arguments being made for it arising from many cavities or the continuing growth of the neurocoele from the initial neurulation. The caudal cell mass will ultimately differentiate and form into many sacral structures such various nerve endings and the conus medullaris.

== Role in disease ==
The caudal cell mass plays a role in many diseases and abnormalities related to the spinal cord. One group of abnormalities it plays a role in are occult spinal dysraphisms. These types of abnormalities arise from specific structures formed in the caudal mass, for example if proper differentiation of the caudal mass does not occur, it could result in a type of spinal dysraphism. One example of spinal dysraphism is caudal regression syndrome. Patients with caudal regression syndrome can experience a varying degree of the abnormality ranging from partial lack of the tail bone and pelvis to more significant cases where there may be paralysis and, as a result, inhibited function in the bowel and bladder. This abnormality can be caused by the caudal cell mass not developing properly due to improper differentiation, and it can lead to sacral agenesis, which is one of the hallmarks of caudal regression syndrome.

Another class of abnormalities from caudal cell mass development includes caudal dysgenesis, which refers to abnormalities where the sacrum may be deformed or absent, or abnormalities in which the spinal cord and the complementary organ systems may be malformed. Some of the abnormalities that fall under this class includes currarino syndrome and sirenomelia. These genetic defects were found to have a much higher rate of incidence in births to mothers with gestational diabetes. This trend may be due to the inhibition of critical elements of morphogenesis, that are found in the extracellular matrix, or due to the presence of an abnormal hox gene. These abnormalities can be predicted ahead of time using ultrasound.
