= Imperforate anus =

Birth defect of malformed rectum

Imperforate anus - Anorectal malformations
- Other names: Anorectal malformations
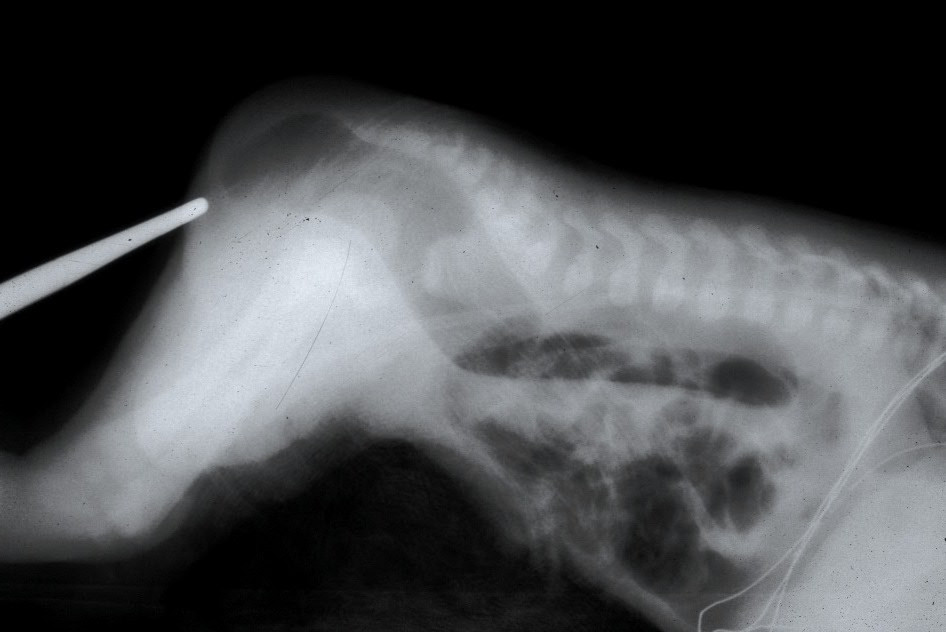
- An X-ray showing imperforate anus
- Specialty: Medical genetics

An imperforate anus or anorectal malformations (ARMs) are birth defects in which the rectum is malformed. ARMs are a spectrum of different congenital anomalies which vary from fairly minor lesions to complex anomalies. The cause of ARMs is unknown; the genetic basis of these anomalies is very complex because of their anatomical variability. In 8% of patients, genetic factors are clearly associated with ARMs. Anorectal malformation in Currarino syndrome represents the only association for which the gene HLXB9 has been identified.

== Types ==
There are other forms of anorectal malformations though imperforate anus is most common. Other variants include cloacal malformation, rectal atresia, rectal stenosis, and anterior ectopic anus. This form is more commonly seen in females and presents with constipation.

== Presentation ==
There are several forms of imperforate anus and anorectal malformations. The new classification is in relation of the type of associated fistula.

The Wingspread classification was in low and high anomalies:

- A low lesion, in which the colon remains close to the skin. In this case, there may be a stenosis (narrowing) of the anus, or the anus may be missing altogether, with the rectum ending in a blind pouch.
- A high lesion, in which the colon is higher up in the pelvis and there is a fistula connecting the rectum and the bladder, urethra or the vagina.
- A persistent cloaca (from the term cloaca, an analogous orifice in birds, reptiles and amphibians), in which the rectum, vagina and urinary tract are joined into a single channel.

Imperforate anus is usually present along with other birth defects—spinal problems, heart problems, tracheoesophageal fistula, esophageal atresia, renal anomalies and limb anomalies are among the possibilities, collectively being called the VACTERL association.

=== Associated anomalies ===
Imperforate anus is associated with an increased incidence of some other specific anomalies as well, together being called the VACTERL association.

Other entities associated with an imperforate anus are trisomies 18 and 21, the cat-eye syndrome (partial trisomy or tetrasomy of a maternally derived chromosome 22), Baller–Gerold syndrome, Currarino syndrome, caudal regression syndrome, FG syndrome, Johanson–Blizzard syndrome, McKusick–Kaufman syndrome, Pallister–Hall syndrome, short rib–polydactyly syndrome type 1, Townes–Brocks syndrome, 13q deletion syndrome, urorectal septum malformation sequence and the OEIS complex (omphalocele, exstrophy of the cloaca, imperforate anus, spinal defects).

== Diagnosis ==
When an infant is born with an anorectal malformation, it is usually detected quickly as it is a very obvious defect. Doctors will then determine the type of birth defect the child was born with and whether or not there are any associated malformations. Determining the presence of any associated defects during the newborn period in order to treat them early may avoid further sequelae. There are two main categories of anorectal malformations: those that require a protective colostomy and those that do not. The decision to open a colostomy is usually taken within the first 24 hours of birth.

Sonography can be used to determine the type of imperforate anus.

== Treatment ==
Imperforate anus usually requires immediate surgery to open a passage for feces unless a fistula can be relied on until corrective surgery takes place. Depending on the severity of the imperforate, it is treated either with a perineal anoplasty or with a colostomy.

While many surgical techniques to definitively repair anorectal malformations have been described, the posterior sagittal anorectoplasty (PSARP) has become the most popular. It involves dissection of the perineum without entry into the abdomen and 90% of defects in boys can be repaired this way.

== Prognosis ==
With a high lesion, many children have problems controlling bowel function and most also become constipated. With a low lesion, children generally have good bowel control, but they may still become constipated. For children who have a poor outcome for continence and constipation from the initial surgery, further surgery to better establish the angle between the anus and the rectum may improve continence and, for those with a large rectum, surgery to remove that dilated segment may significantly improve the bowel control for the patient. An antegrade enema mechanism can be established by joining the appendix to the skin (Malone stoma); however, establishing more normal anatomy is the priority.

== Epidemiology ==
Imperforate anus has an estimated incidence of 1 in 5,000 births. It affects boys and girls with similar frequency. However, imperforate anus will present as the low version 90% of the time in females and 50% of the time in males.

Imperforate anus is an occasional complication of sacrococcygeal teratoma.

== History ==
Seventh-century Byzantine physician Paulus Aegineta described a surgical treatment for imperforate anus for the first time. Tenth-century Persian physician Haly Abbas was the first to highlight preserving the sphincter muscles throughout the surgery and the prevention of strictures with a stent. He reported the use of wine for wound care in this surgery. Some reports of children surviving this surgery are available from the early medieval Islamic era.
