= Australia at the 2014 Winter Paralympics =

- IPC code: AUS
- NPC: Australian Paralympic Committee
- Website: www.paralympic.org.au

in Sochi
- Competitors: 9 in 2 sports
- Flag bearer: Cameron Rahles-Rahbula (Opening) Ben Tudhope (Closing)
- Officials: 15
- Medals Ranked 19th: Gold 0 Silver 0 Bronze 2 Total 2

Winter Paralympics appearances (overview)
- 1976; 1980; 1984; 1988; 1992; 1994; 1998; 2002; 2006; 2010; 2014; 2018; 2022; 2026

Australia sent nine competitors to the 2014 Winter Paralympics in Sochi, Russia. The delegation also consisted of two sighted guides and 15 support staff. The team won two bronze medals. Toby Kane won a bronze medal in the men's Super combined standing, and Jessica Gallagher and guide Christian Geiger won one in the women's giant slalom visually impaired event.

The Australian Team's performance was affected by the death of para-snowboarder Matthew Robinson just prior to the Games, and injuries to Cameron Rahles-Rahbula and Joany Badenhorst forcing them to withdraw from their events.

== Team Preparation ==
Australian Paralympic Winter Program members competed in competitions in Europe and the United States in the lead up to the 2014 Winter Paralympics in Sochi, Russia. In September 2013, Australia hosted the IPC Alpine Skiing World Cup at Thredbo, New South Wales. Australia finished the competition with three gold, three silver and one bronze medal to finish third on the medal tally behind the United States (eight gold, six silver, eight bronze medals) and Slovakia (eight gold, two silver, three bronze medals). Australia's Mitchell Gourley and Cameron Rahles-Rahbula won gold medals.

Three team members – Toby Kane, Cameron Rahles-Rahbula and Mitchell Gourley undertook wind tunnel testing at Monash University in 2013 to assist them in determining their optimal aerodynamic position whilst skiing.

=== Pre Games Skiing Accidents ===
The Australian Paralympic Team suffered two major skiing accidents just prior to the games. Matthew Robinson died after a boarding accident while competing at the IPC Alpine Skiing World Cup, Whilst Robinson's event was not included in the Games, he was an integral member of the Australian Paralympic snowboard team. Less than a day after being named as Australia's flagbearer for the Sochi Paralympics, Cameron Rahles-Rahbula was injured in a large crash during the downhill training run of the 2014 Sochi Winter Paralympic Games on the eve of the opening ceremony. Rahles-Rahbula suffered knee and ankle injuries that forced him to miss his races, but he still hoped to be able to compete in his pet event, the slalom, and in the giant slalom. On 10 March 2014, it was revealed that Rahles-Rahbula has a knee fracture and would not be able to compete in any of his Paralympic events.

== Administration ==
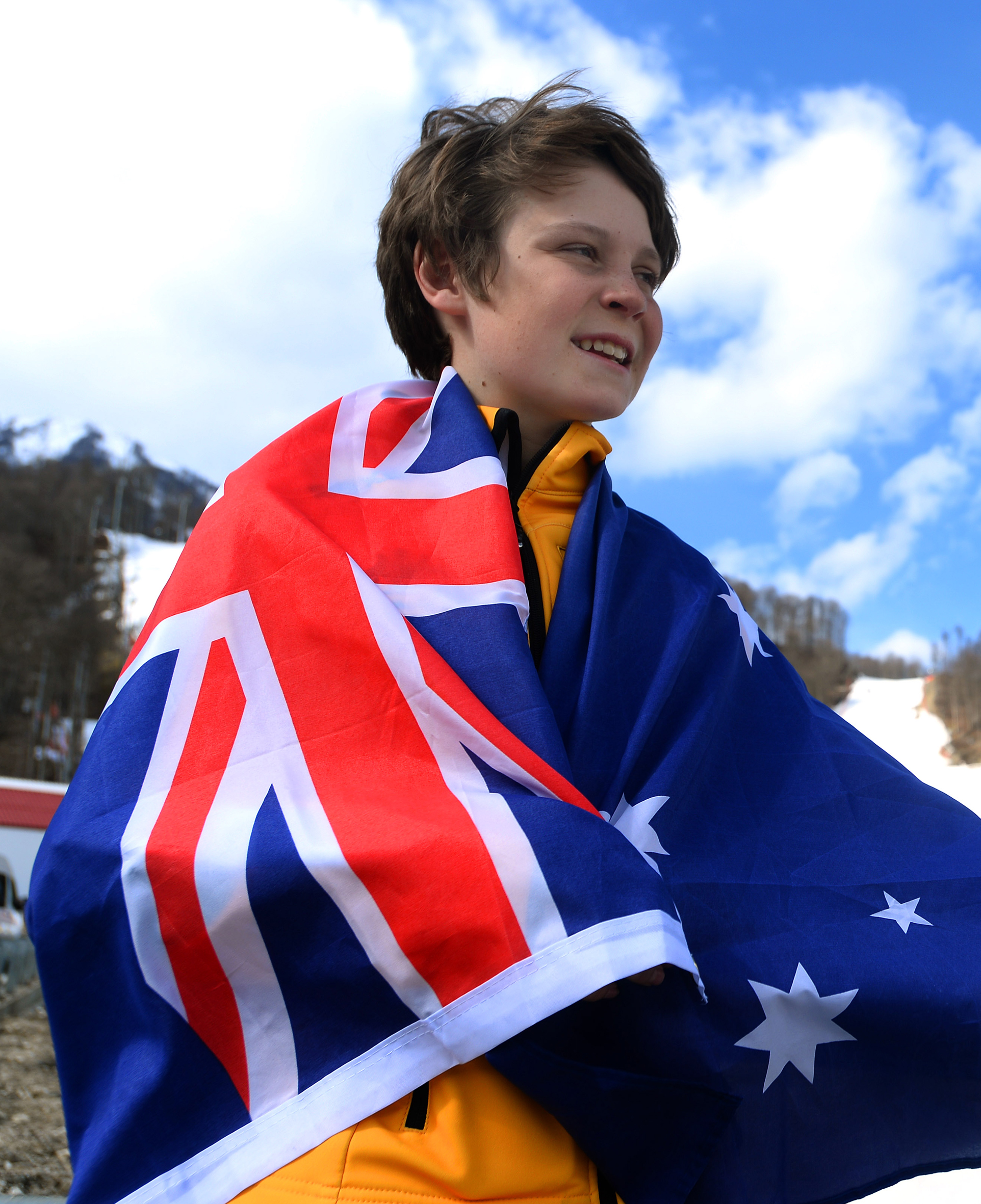
Ben Tudhope was given the honour of carrying the flag for Australia at the Closing Ceremony

Kate McLoughlin was appointed the Chef de Mission in March 2013. This was the first time that a woman had been appointed a Chef de Mission. However, she stepped down due to family reasons, and was replaced by Chris Nunn in November 2013. The Australian Paralympic Committee announced that it cost AUD $1.5 million fund the Sochi campaign, with $200,000 of the budget still outstanding. To raise additional funds, it launched the "Believe" campaign.

Team Support
| Position | Person | Reference |
|---|---|---|
| Chef de Mission | Chris Nunn | |
| Manager, Team Operations | Caroline Walker | |
| Team Attaché | Adam Cormack | |
| Manager, Media and Communications | Tim Mannion | |
| Manager, Multimedia | Sean Giles | |
| Head coach, Alpine | Steve Graham | |
| Assistant coach, Alpine | Michael Milton | |
| Coach, Snowboard | Peter Higgins | |
| Ski Technician | Alan Dean | |
| Ski Technician | Francis "Spike" Kullas | |
| Team Doctor | Dr Geoff Thompson | |
| Lead physiotherapist | Jonathon Davis | |
| Physiotherapist | Joel Cook | |
| Sport Scientist | Markus Klusemann | |
| Sports psychologist | Sarah Jack | |

== Team ==
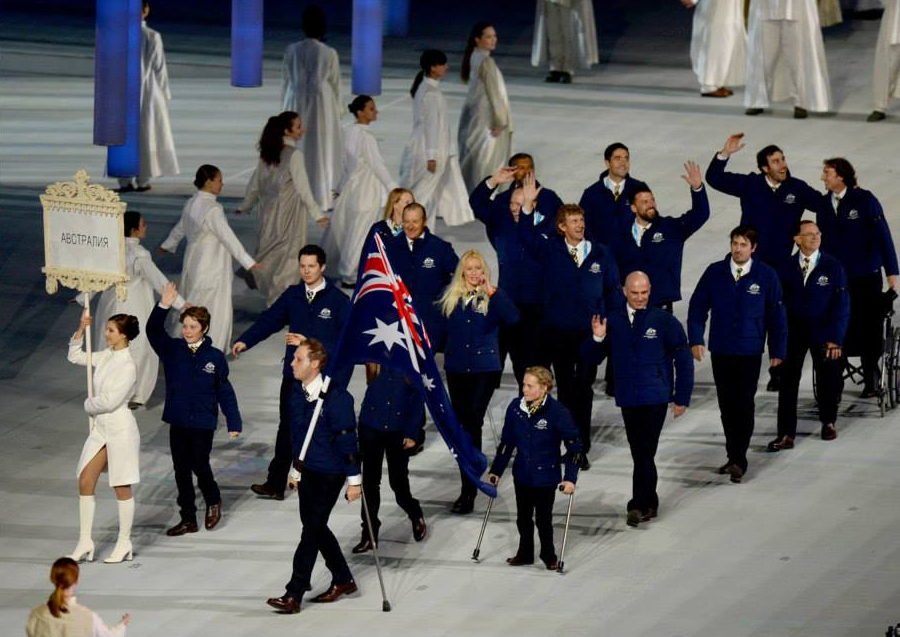
The Australian Team marches at the Opening Ceremony of the Sochi 2014 Paralympic Winter Games, led by flagbearer Cameron Rahles-Rahbula.

On 4 February 2014, Australian Paralympic Committee announced a team of nine athletes, as well as two sighted guides, to attend the 2014 Sochi Winter Paralympics. Their head coach is Steve Graham. Athletes selected were:

Alpine skiing

- Jessica Gallagher
- Christian Geiger (guide for Gallagher)
- Mitchell Gourley
- Toby Kane
- Victoria Pendergast
- Melissa Perrine
- Andrew Bor (guide for Perrine)
- Cameron Rahles-Rahbula

Snowboard cross

- Joany Badenhorst
- Trent Milton
- Ben Tudhope.

Victoria Pendergast became Australia's first female sit-skier to compete at a Winter Paralympics, and Ben Tudhope, who turned 14 in December 2013, became Australia's youngest competitor at the Winter Paralympics. The 14-year-old Tudhope was the youngest competitor at the Games from any nation. The team included three medallists from previous Winter Paralympics: Jessica Gallagher, Toby Kane and Cameron-Rahles-Rahbula. Four athletes and one guide made their Games debut.

== Ceremonies ==
Cameron Rahles-Rahbula, competing at his fourth Winter Paralympics, was named as the Australian flag bearer for the Opening Ceremony. After being named flag bearer, Rahles-Rahbula had a skiing training accident that made his participation doubtful. He went on to carry the flag but withdrew from the Games on medical advice. At Opening Ceremony, the entire Australian team of nine athletes, coaches, medical staff and administration officials wore the black arm bands to remember Matthew Robinson, who had recently died as a result of a skiing accident. Ben Tudhope, the youngest competitor at the Games, carried the Australian flag at the Closing Ceremony.

== Medallists ==
| Medal | Name | Sport | Event | Date |
|---|---|---|---|---|
| 3rd place, bronze medalist(s) | Toby Kane | Alpine skiing | Men's Super combined standing | 14 March |
| 3rd place, bronze medalist(s) | Jessica Gallagher /Christian Geiger (guide) | Alpine skiing | Women's giant slalom visually impaired | 15 March |

== Events ==
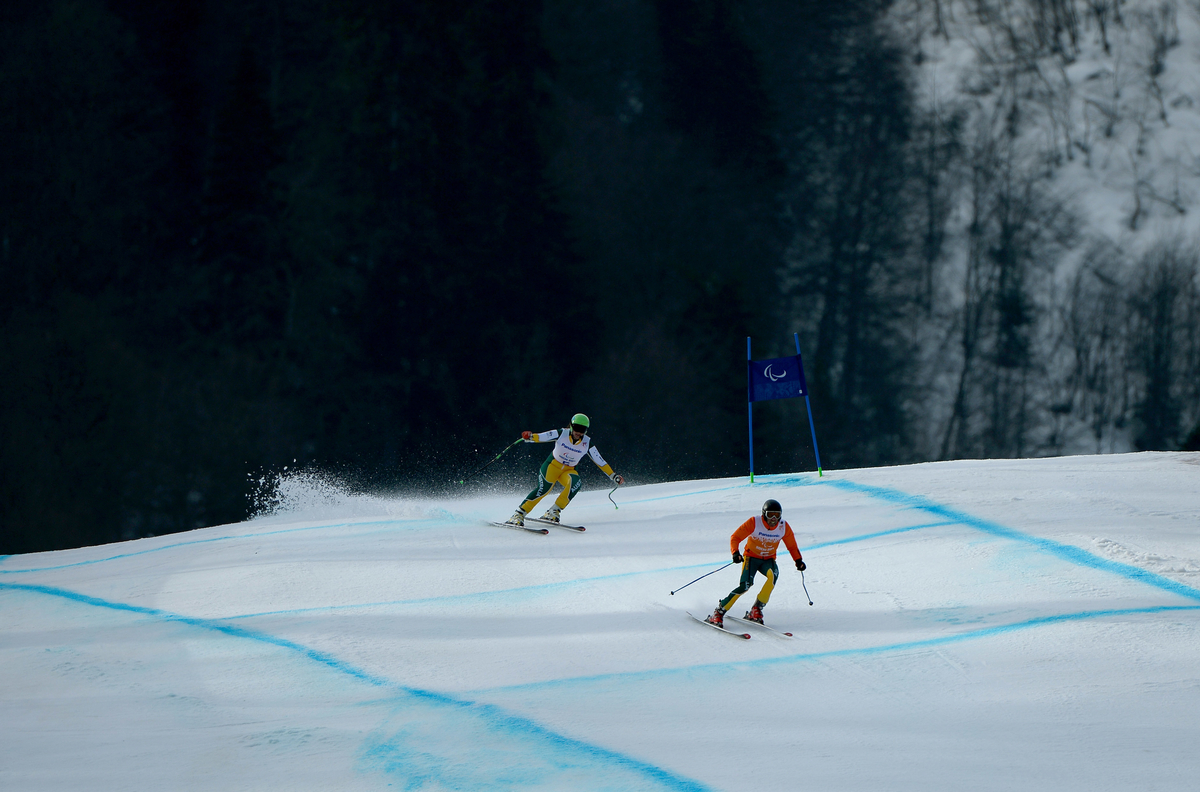
Melissa Perrine and her guide Andy Bor in the women's Downhill at the 2014 Winter Paralympics

=== Alpine skiing ===
The International Paralympic Committee introduced para-snowboard as an alpine skiing discipline for the 2014 Games. These events are for standing athletes with a lower body disability.

Women

| Athlete | Event | Final | | | | Date |
| Athlete | Event | Run 1 | Run 2 | Total Time | Rank | Date |
|---|---|---|---|---|---|---|
| Jessica Gallagher / Christian Geiger (guide) B3 | Slalom B & VI | 1:04.09 | 1:38.46 | 2:42.55 | 7 | 14 March |
| Jessica Gallagher / Christian Geiger (guide) B3 | Giant slalom B & VI | 1:36.69 | 1:25.42 | 3:02.11 | 3rd place, bronze medalist(s) | 16 March |
| Melissa Perrine / Andy Bor (guide) B2 | Downhill B & VI | | | 1:36.15 | 4 | 8 March |
| Melissa Perrine / Andy Bor (guide) B2 | Super-G B & VI | | | DNF | | 10 March |
| Melissa Perrine / Andy Bor (guide) B2 | Super combined B & VI | DSQ | | | | 11 March |
| Melissa Perrine / Andy Bor (guide) B2 | Slalom B & VI | DNF | | | | 14 March |
| Melissa Perrine / Andy Bor (guide) B2 | Giant slalom B & VI | DNF | | | | 16 March |
| Victoria Pendergast LW12-1 | Slalom sit-ski | 1:21.53 | 1:21.82 | 2:43.35 | 7 | 14 March |
| Victoria Pendergast LW12-1 | Giant slalom sit-ski | 1:54.37 | 1:40.22 | 3:34.59 | 10 | 16 March |
| Joany Badenhorst | Cross Lower Limb | DNS | | | | 14 March |

DNF – did not finish
DSQ – disqualified. Melissa Perrine was disqualified after the slalom leg of the Super combined for wearing a visor, which was taped to her helmet, to keep rain from her goggles. This was a breach of the IPC Alpine Skiing rules. Jason Hellwig, CEO of the Australian Paralympic Committee described it as "mindnumbingly-dumb mistake" as it was not picked up by relevant team officials. He indicated it was an honest mistake and there was no intention to cheat.
DNS – Badenhorst was forced to withdraw from the event after suffering an injury to her left knee whilst training on the morning of the event.

Men

| Athlete | Event | Final | | | | Date |
| Athlete | Event | Run 1 | Run 2 | Total Time | Rank | Date |
|---|---|---|---|---|---|---|
| Mitchell Gourley LW6/8-2 | Downhill Standing | | | 1:26.71 | 7 | 8 March |
| Mitchell Gourley LW6/8-2 | Slalom Standing | 50.75 | DNF | | | 13 March |
| Mitchell Gourley LW6/8-2 | Giant slalom standing | 1:16.16 | DNF | | | 15 March |
| Mitchell Gourley LW6/8-2 | Super-G standing | | | DNF | | 9 March |
| Mitchell Gourley LW6/8-2 | Super combined standing | 53.63 | 1:20.75 | 2:14.38 | 5 | 11 March |
| Toby Kane LW2 | Downhill Standing | | | 1:26.25 | 6 | 8 March |
| Toby Kane LW2 | Slalom Standing | 48.69 | 54.56 | 1:43.48 | 4 | 13 March |
| Toby Kane LW2 | Giant slalom Standing | DNF | | | | 15 March |
| Toby Kane LW2 | Super-G Standing | | | DNF | | 9 March |
| Toby Kane LW2 | Super combined Standing | 53.52 | 1:20.62 | 2:14.14 | 3rd place, bronze medalist(s) | 11 March |
| Cameron Rahles-Rahbula LW2 | Downhill Standing | | | DNS | | 8 March |
| Cameron Rahles-Rahbula LW2 | Slalom Standing | DNS | | | | 13 March |
| Cameron Rahles-Rahbula LW2 | Giant slalom Standing | DNS | | | | 15 March |
| Cameron Rahles-Rahbula LW2 | Super-G Standing | | | DNS | | 9 March |
| Cameron Rahles-Rahbula LW2 | Super combined Standing | DNS | | | | 11 March |
| Trent Milton | Cross Lower Limb | 1:03.58 | 1:14.27 | 2:07.95 | 20 | 14 March |
| Ben Tudhope | Cross Lower Limb | 58.78 | 59.31 | 1:56.84 | 10 | 14 March |

DNF – did not finish.
DNS – did not start. Cameron Rahles-Rahbula withdrew from all competitions after the Games commenced. This was due to injuries sustained in training just prior to the Games.

== Broadcasting ==
The Australian Broadcasting Corporation showed a daily 30 minutes highlights program twice a day, and also streamed the alpine skiing and ice hockey live on its Grandstand website. The Games' opening ceremony was broadcast live. The presenters for the ABC's coverage were Amanda Shalala and Darren Boyd.

== Outcome ==
Australia finished the Games with two bronze medals. Jason Hellwig stated that the aim was to win between two and five medals. He said: "two medals absolutely is a pass ... so we're really pleased with that but we're absolutely disappointed we didn't get the mission done to win that gold medal, but I tell you what, we are absolutely determined to get it done in four years' time. It hasn't been easy, we've come in under the most difficult of circumstances that I've ever seen a team at a major Games." Chris Nunn, Chef de Mission, pointed to the future by stating that "We really need to focus on having good-quality athletes who are robust and have financial support to get overseas. It's not like living in Austria, Sweden or Germany where you can do this on the weekend and after work."

Toby Kane and Cameron Rahles-Rahbula indicated that Sochi Games would be their last Winter Paralympics. Kane and Dutch snowboarder Bibian Mentel-Spee were named winners of the Whang Youn Dai Achievement Award, which is presented at every Paralympic Games for outstanding performances and overcoming adversity.

== See also ==
- Images of the Australian Team at the 2014 Winter Paralympics
