= Siggins =

Siggins is a surname. Notable people with the surname include:

- Jack Siggins (1909–1995), Irish rugby union player
- Maggie Siggins (born 1942), Canadian journalist and writer
- Rose Siggins (1972–2015), American actress
- Selina Siggins (1878–1964), Australian political activist
