= Alpine skiing at the 2014 Winter Paralympics – Men's snowboard cross =

Men's snowboard cross at the XI Paralympic Winter Games
- Paralympic snowboarding
- Venue: Rosa Khutor Extreme Park, Krasnaya Polyana, Russia
- Dates: 14 March 2014
- Competitors: 33 from 20 nations

Medalists
1st place, gold medalist(s)		Evan Strong	United States
2nd place, silver medalist(s)		Mike Shea	United States
3rd place, bronze medalist(s)		Keith Gabel	United States

The men's snowboard cross competition of the 2014 Winter Paralympics was held at Rosa Khutor Extreme Park near Krasnaya Polyana, Russia. The competition took place on 14 March 2014. It made its Winter Paralympics debut. The only classification taking part in this event are the standing athletes.

== Results ==
Each athlete raced the course 3 times and their top 2 times was added together to get the total time.

Rank	Bib	Name	Country	Race 1	Rank	Race 2	Rank	Race 3	Rank	Total	Difference
1st place, gold medalist(s)	19	Evan Strong	United States	52.55	2	51.62	1	51.99	1	1:43.61	-
2nd place, silver medalist(s)	20	Mike Shea	United States	52.29	1	51.89	2	1:00.27	9	1:44.18	+0.57
3rd place, bronze medalist(s)	28	Keith Gabel	United States	54.02	3	53.61	3	53.49	3	1:47.10	+3.49
4	25	Carl Murphy	New Zealand	54.62	4	54.48	4	DSQ		1:49.10	+5.49
5	14	Tomáš Vaverka	Czech Republic	1:00.91	12	57.12	9	53.03	2	1:50.15	+6.54
6	16	Denis Colle	Belgium	55.83	5	54.49	5	DNF		1:50.32	+6.71
7	15	John Leslie	Canada	56.74	6	56.25	6	55.63	4	1:51.88	+8.27
8	26	Tyler Burdick	United States	57.03	7	56.73	7	55.76	5	1:52.49	+8.88
9	18	Carlos Javier Codina Thomatis	Argentina	58.01	9	56.99	8	56.57	6	1:53.56	+9.95
10	17	Ben Tudhope	Australia	58.78	10	59.31	10	58.06	7	1:56.84	+13.23
11	27	Matti Suur-Hamari	Finland	57.37	8	DNF		1:02.19	14	1:59.56	+15.95
12	23	Tyler Mosher	Canada	1:03.73	14	59.69	11	1:00.11	8	1:59.80	+16.19
13	13	Chris Vos	Netherlands	1:00.03	11	1:00.69	12	1:03.24	17	2:00.72	+17.11
14	22	Merijn Koek	Netherlands	1:21.94	26	1:00.78	13	1:00.63	11	2:01.41	+17.80
15	32	Wojciech Taraba	Poland	1:09.09	19	1:01.68	14	1:00.49	10	2:02.17	+18.56
16	21	Patrice Barattero	France	1:07.26	18	1:03.44	15	1:01.16	12	2:04.60	+20.99
17	31	Urko Egea Zabalza	Spain	1:03.89	15	1:11.76	19	1:02.60	15	2:06.49	+22.88
18	30	Daniel Monzo	United States	1:04.67	16	1:14.57	22	1:02.85	16	2:07.52	+23.91
19	36	Marek Hlavina	Slovakia	1:05.42	17	1:04.36	16	1:03.57	18	2:07.93	+24.32
20	29	Trent Milton	Australia	1:03.58	13	1:14.27	21	1:04.37	19	2:07.95	+24.34
21	24	Ian Lockey	Canada	1:09.81	21	1:08.79	18	1:01.47	13	2:10.26	+26.65
22	40	Stefan Losler	Germany	1:16.35	24	1:06.37	17	1:34.52	29	2:22.72	+39.11
23	33	Giuseppe Comunale	Italy	1:09.54	20	1:19.23	26	1:13.67	22	2:23.21	+39.60
24	35	Ivan Osharov	Ukraine	DSQ		1:12.87	20	1:10.35	21	2:23.22	+39.61
25	37	Fabio Piscitello	Italy	1:24.34	27	1:15.90	25	1:10.28	20	2:26.18	+42.57
26	39	Luca Righetti	Italy	1:14.75	22	1:15.09	23	1:17.33	24	2:29.84	+46.23
27	41	Aleksandr Ilinov	Russia	1:15.81	23	1:15.62	24	1:14.90	23	2:30.52	+46.91
28	38	André Cintra	Brazil	1:37.17	30	1:23.09	27	1:18.98	26	2:42.07	+58.46
29	43	Igor Ivanov	Russia	1:19.55	25	1:23.93	28	1:37.24	31	2:43.48	+59.87
30	34	Aitor Puertas Marin	Spain	DSQ		1:29.54	30	1:17.50	25	2:47.04	+1:03.43
31	44	Kirill Finkelman	Russia	DSQ		1:24.57	29	1:23.94	27	2:48.51	+1:04.90
32	42	Yevgeniy Slepov	Uzbekistan	1:33.45	28	1:41.39	31	1:28.68	28	3:02.13	+1:18.52
33	45	Georg Schwab	Austria	1:34.94	29	1:54.47	32	1:35.63	30	3:10.57	+1:26.96

== See also ==
- Alpine skiing at the 2014 Winter Olympics
