= Cloaca =

Posterior opening in zoology

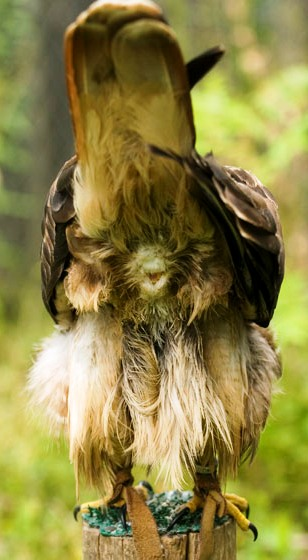
Cloaca of a red-tailed hawk

A cloaca (/kloʊˈeɪkə/ kloh-AY-kə; pl. cloacae, /kloʊˈeɪki, -si/ kloh-AY-kee, -see) or vent is the rear orifice that serves as the only opening for the digestive (rectum), reproductive, and urinary tracts (if present) of many vertebrate animals. All amphibians, reptiles, birds, cartilaginous fish and a few mammals (monotremes, afrosoricids, and marsupial moles) have this orifice, from which they excrete both urine and feces; this is in contrast to most placental mammals, which have separate orifices for evacuation and reproduction. Excretory openings with analogous purpose in some invertebrates are also sometimes called cloacae. Mating through the cloaca is called cloacal copulation and cloacal kissing.

The cloacal region is also often associated with a secretory organ, the cloacal gland, which has been implicated in the scent-marking behavior of some reptiles, marsupials, amphibians, and monotremes.

== Etymology ==
The word is from the Latin verb cluo, "(I) cleanse", thus the noun cloaca, "sewer, drain".

== Birds ==
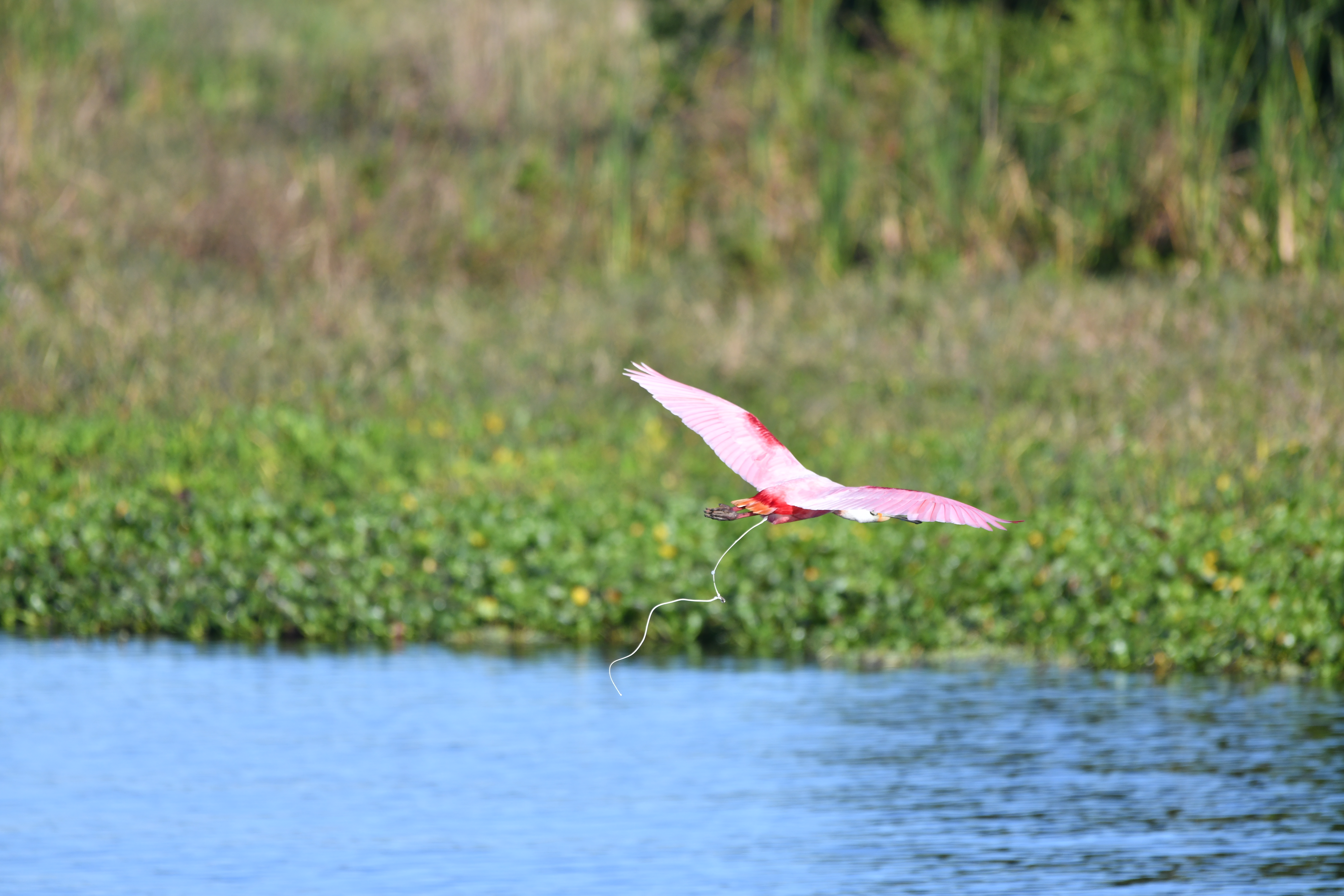
A roseate spoonbill excreting urine in flight

Birds reproduce using their cloaca; this occurs during a cloacal kiss in most birds. Birds that mate using this method touch their cloacae together, in some species for only a few seconds, sufficient time for sperm to be transferred from the male to the female. For palaeognaths and waterfowl, the males do not use the cloaca for reproduction, but have a phallus.

== Fish ==
Among fish, a true cloaca is present only in elasmobranchs (sharks and rays) and lobe-finned fishes. In lampreys and in some ray-finned fishes, part of the cloaca remains in the adult to receive the urinary and reproductive ducts, although the anus always opens separately. In chimaeras and most teleosts, however, all three openings are entirely separated.

== Synapsids including mammals ==
With a few exceptions noted below, mammals have no cloaca. Even in the marsupials that have one, the cloaca is partially subdivided into separate regions for the anus and urethra.

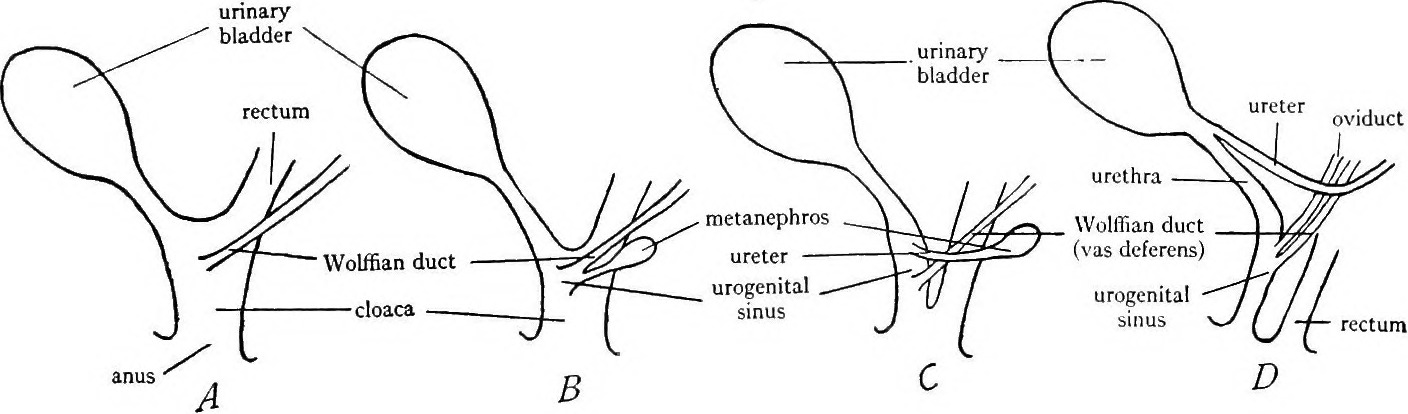
Diagrams to illustrate the changes in the cloaca in mammals during development. A, early embryonic stage, showing the cloaca receiving the urinary bladder, the rectum, and the Wolffian duct, as in non-therian vertebrates. B, later stage, showing the beginning of the fold which divides the cloaca into a ventral urogenital sinus which receives the urinary bladder, Wolffian ducts, and ureters, and into a dorsal part which receives the rectum. C, further progress of the fold, dividing the cloaca into urogenital sinus and rectum; the ureter has separated from the Wolffian duct and is shifting anteriorly. D, completion of the fold, showing complete separation of the cloaca into ventral urogenital sinus and dorsal rectum.

=== Non-mammalian synapsids ===
A cloacal impression in a trace fossil that was created by a non-mammalian synapsid, likely a caseid, has been reported from the early Permian of Germany. This indicates the cloaca was located at the base of the tail and was directed downwards.

=== Monotremes ===
The monotremes (egg-laying mammals) possess a true cloaca.

=== Marsupials ===
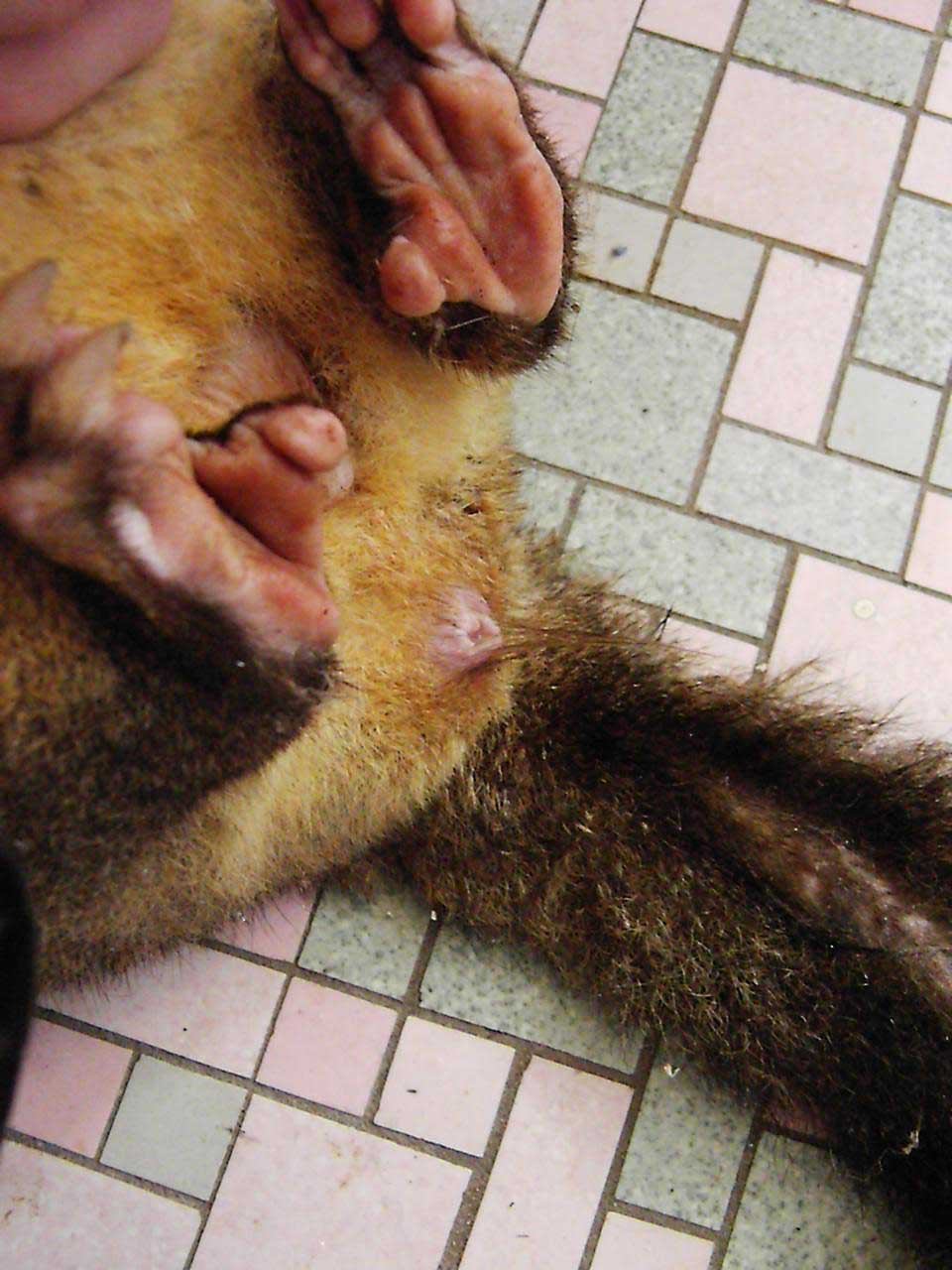
Cloacal opening in an Australian brushtail possum

In marsupials, the genital tract is separate from the anus, but a trace of the original cloaca does remain externally. This is one of the features of marsupials (and monotremes) that suggest their basal nature, as the amniotes from which mammals evolved had a cloaca, and probably so did the earliest mammals.

Unlike other marsupials, marsupial moles have a true cloaca.

=== Placental mammals ===
Most adult placental mammals have no cloaca. In the embryo, the embryonic cloaca divides into a posterior region that becomes part of the anus, and an anterior region that develops depending on sex: in males, it forms the penile urethra, while in females, it develops into the vestibule or urogenital sinus that receives the urethra and vagina. However, some placental mammals retain a cloaca as adults: those are members of the order Afrosoricida (small mammals native to Africa) as well as pikas, beavers, and some shrews.

Being placental mammals, humans have an embryonic cloaca which divides into separate tracts during the development of the urinary and reproductive organs. However, a few human congenital disorders result in persons being born with a cloaca, including persistent cloaca and sirenomelia (mermaid syndrome).

== Reptiles ==
In reptiles, the cloaca consists of the urodeum, proctodeum, and coprodeum. Some species have modified cloacae for increased gas exchange (see reptile respiration and reptile reproduction). This is where reproductive activity occurs.

== Cloacal respiration in animals ==
Some turtles, especially those specialized in diving, are highly reliant on cloacal respiration during dives. They accomplish this by having a pair of accessory air bladders connected to the cloaca, which can absorb oxygen from the water.

Sea cucumbers use cloacal respiration. The constant flow of water through it has allowed various fish, polychaete worms and even crabs to specialize to take advantage of it while living protected inside the cucumber. At night, many of these species emerge through the anus of the sea cucumber in search of food.
