= Zion Clark =

American professional wrestler (born 1997)

Personal information
- Born: Zion Zachariah Daniels; September 29, 1997 (age 28) Columbus, Ohio, U.S.
- Height: 3 ft 2 in (97 cm)
- Weight: 110 lb (50 kg)
- Website: zionclark.com

Sport
- University team: Kent State University
- Team: Team Bodyshop

Zion Zachariah Clark (born September 29, 1997) is an American wrestler, professional mixed martial artist, and wheelchair racer. Clark was born without legs due to a rare disorder called Caudal regression syndrome. He attended Kent State University at Tuscarawas, Ohio, where he was a member of the wrestling team. Clark was named the "fastest man on two hands” by the Guinness Book of World Records.

== Personal life ==
Clark grew up in Ohio's foster care system and was adopted. Clark is featured in the 2018 documentary Zion, which was an official selection for the Sundance Film Festival and was later featured on Netflix. The documentary won two Emmys at the 40th annual Sports Emmy Awards. On May 23, 2023, he also featured on HBO's Real Sports with Bryant Gumbel. In 2023, he also made an appearance on America's Got Talent and showed off his athletic abilities to the judges. He advanced to next stage, receiving four yeses and he was eliminated in the top 5 of the semifinals.

== Career ==
=== Wrestling ===
During his freshman and sophomore years at Massillon Washington High School, Clark had no wins in wrestling. However, he increased his training during his junior season, and in his senior season compiled a 33–15 record. He then attended Kent State University, where he competed in wrestling and wheelchair racing.

=== Mixed martial arts career ===
Clark made his professional debut, for Gladiator Challenge: Seasons Beatings, on December 17, 2022, against Eugene Murray. He won the fight via a unanimous decision.

=== Professional grappling ===
Clark lost a bout by rear-naked choke in the first round against UFC fighter Valter Walker in a grappling match at Pit Submission Series 13 on February 13, 2026.

=== Writing ===
Clark's first book, a photographic essay meant for readers aged 8–12 years old and titled Zion Unmatched, was published in 2021. In 2023, his memoir for readers aged 14–18 years old, Work with What You Got, was published. Both were co-written with James S. Hirsch.

== Submission grappling career ==
Clark faced Valter Walker in an openweight submission grappling match at Karate Combat 59 on February 13, 2026. Clark lost the match by submission with a rear-naked choke.

== Mixed martial arts record ==
Professional record breakdown
1 match	1 win	0 losses
By decision	1	0

Res.	Record	Opponent	Method	Event	Date	Round	Time	Location	Notes
Win	1–0	Eugene Murray	Decision (unanimous)	Gladiator Challenge: Seasons Beatings	December 17, 2022	3	5:00	Valley Center, California, United States	Bantamweight bout.
