= Matthew Robinson (snowboarder) =

Australian snowboarder (1985–2014)

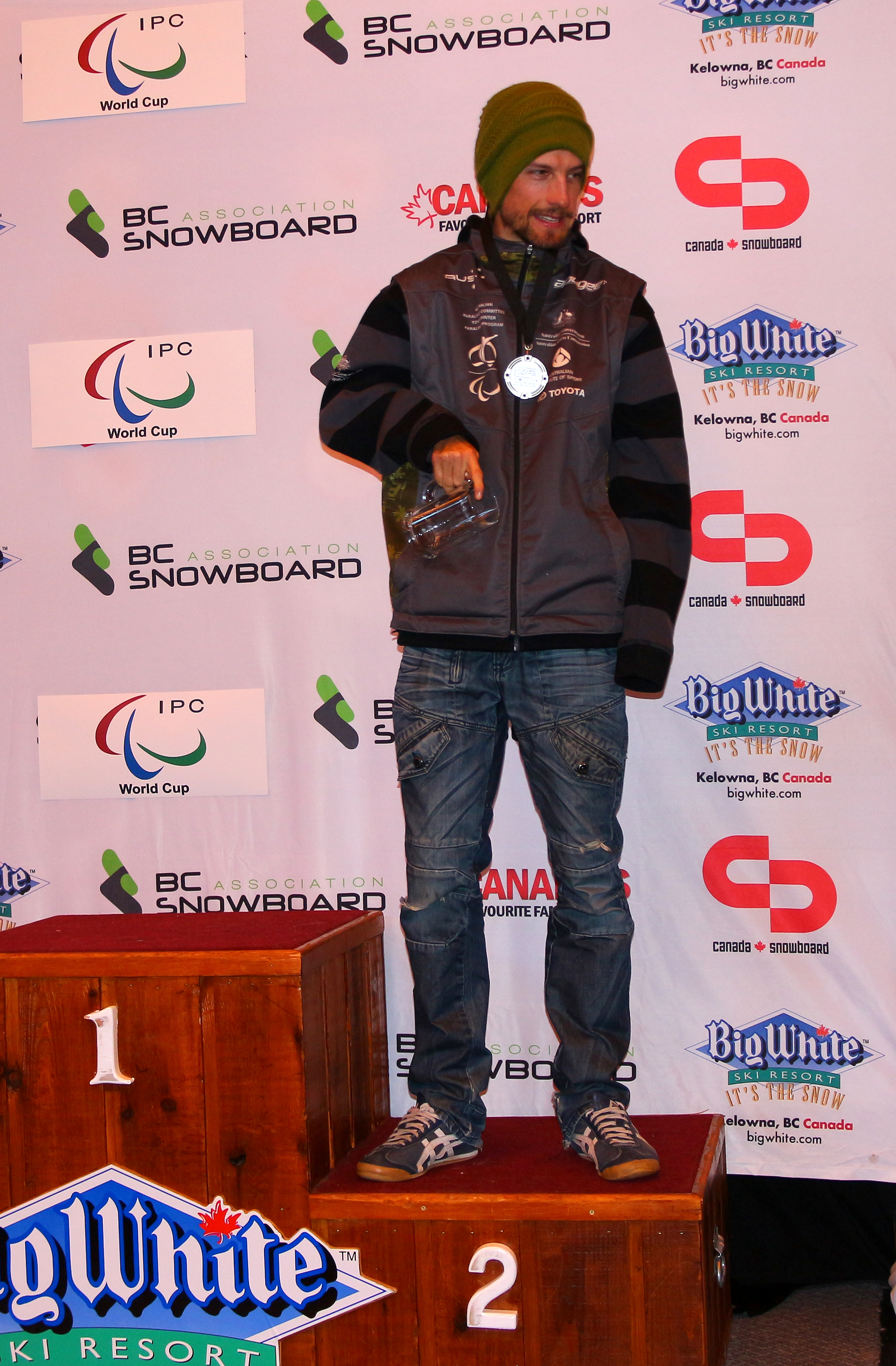
- Robinson in 2014

Personal information
- Nationality: Australia
- Born: Matthew John Robinson; 24 October 1985
- Died: 21 February 2014 (aged 28) Kuwait

Sport
- Country: Australia
- Sport: Para-snowboarding

Matthew John Robinson (24 October 1985 – 21 February 2014) was an Australian Paralympic snowboarder who died as a result of a snowboarding accident at La Molina, Spain.

== Early and personal life ==
Robinson was born on 24 October 1985. He was the youngest son of Stephen and Carol Ann. His siblings were Tracy and Jarrod. At the time of his death, his fiancée was Gecel, and he lived in Melbourne, Victoria.

== Snowboarding ==
Robinson had an arm impairment and competed in the upper limb classification. This classification was not included in the 2014 Winter Paralympics program. In 2014, he won Australia's first IPC Alpine Skiing World Cup snowboard gold medal in Copper Mountain, Colorado. He also won a silver medal at this event. The previous year, he won a bronze medal at the same event. At the time of his death, he was leading at the IPC World Cup snowboard rankings. At the IPC World Cup in La Molina, Spain, he crashed at the bottom of the first run of his second race at the competition. After being stabilised, he was airlifted by helicopter to Hospital Parc Tauli in Sabadell, Barcelona, Spain. He underwent surgery to treat neck and spinal injuries. On 21 February, whilst travelling back to Australia by a specialised air ambulance, he suffered a cardiac arrest during a re-fuelling stop in Kuwait. CPR was administered but he could not be revived.

A memorial service was held in Perth, Western Australia, on 7 March and members of the Australian Winter Paralympic Team snowboard team sent personal messages to be read out at the service. At the Opening Ceremony of the 2014 Winter Paralympics in Sochi, the entire Australian team of nine athletes, along with coaches, medical staff and administration officials, wore the black armbands to remember Robinson.

Philip Craven, President of the International Paralympic Committee stated: The whole of the Paralympic movement is deeply saddened by this heart-breaking tragedy. Matthew was a world class and extremely popular athlete, a fact underlined by the vast number of support messages he received from around the world following last week's accident. Peter Higgins, the Australian Paralympic Team snowboard coach said: He led by example and in doing that he lifted the entire team to be the best that they could be. Matty very much embodies the spirit of Paralympic sport; the fight we all fight; and the success you can achieve after putting in all that hard work.

A tribute to Robinson now hangs in Disabled Wintersport Australia's 'Finskos Lodge' where he spent winters training in Jindabyne. The Tribute shows 5 pictures of Robinson and the Australian Para Snowboard team and reads, "Mathew John Robinson, 24 Oct 1985 – 21 Feb 2014. May the memory of Mathew continue to inspire all those who knew and loved him. Australia's first para-snowboard World Cup gold medalist (2013). One gold, five silver, one bronze. Matty was the pinnacle of determination through sport. The Team Captain set the bar high, and will be missed. WE RIDE FOR MATTY."

in 2019, Matthew Robinson's Family, Disabled Wintersport Australia, and Paralympics Australia established the Matthew Robinson Scholarship to assist emerging Para athletes offset some of the costs involved in participating in Winter sport.
