= Kate McLoughlin =

Australian sport administrator

Kate McLoughlin is an Australian sports administrator. She has been Chef de Mission for four Australian Paralympic Teams..

McLoughlin graduated from Ravenswood School, Sydney in 1996. She completed a Bachelor of Arts at the University of Technology Sydney, specialising in human movement and sports management. Prior to being employed by Paralympics Australia as a Senior Manager in 2009, she worked for several sports organisations including New South Wales Institute of Sport and Australian Olympic Committee. In 2009, she was the Villages Manager for the 2009 Australian Youth Olympic Festival. McLoughlin has been a Senior Manager at Paralympics Australia since 2009. McLoughlin was selected to be the Chef de Mission of the Australian Team at the 2014 Winter Paralympics but withdrew due to family reasons.

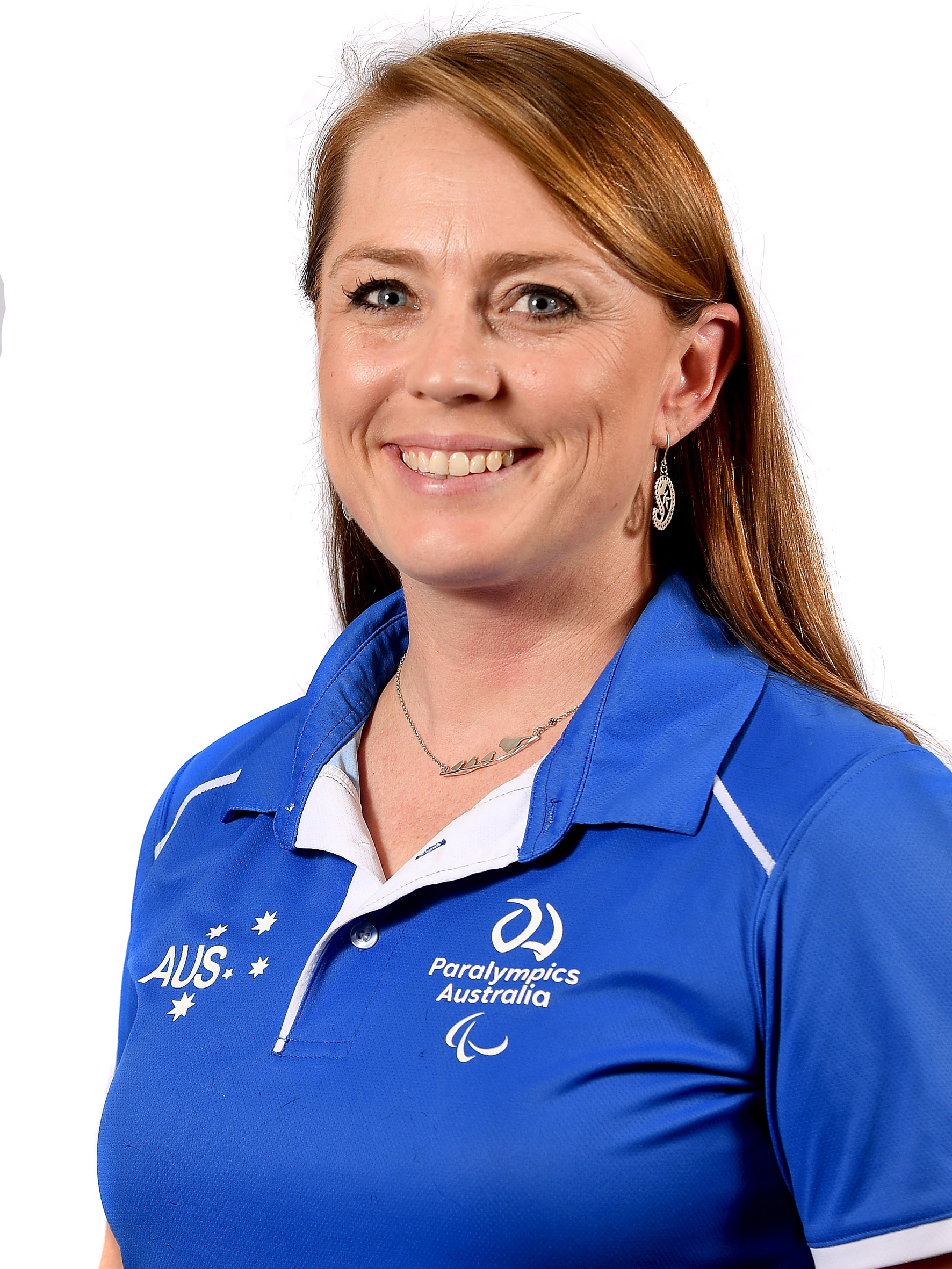
McLoughlin Chef de Mission at 2022 Winter Paralympics

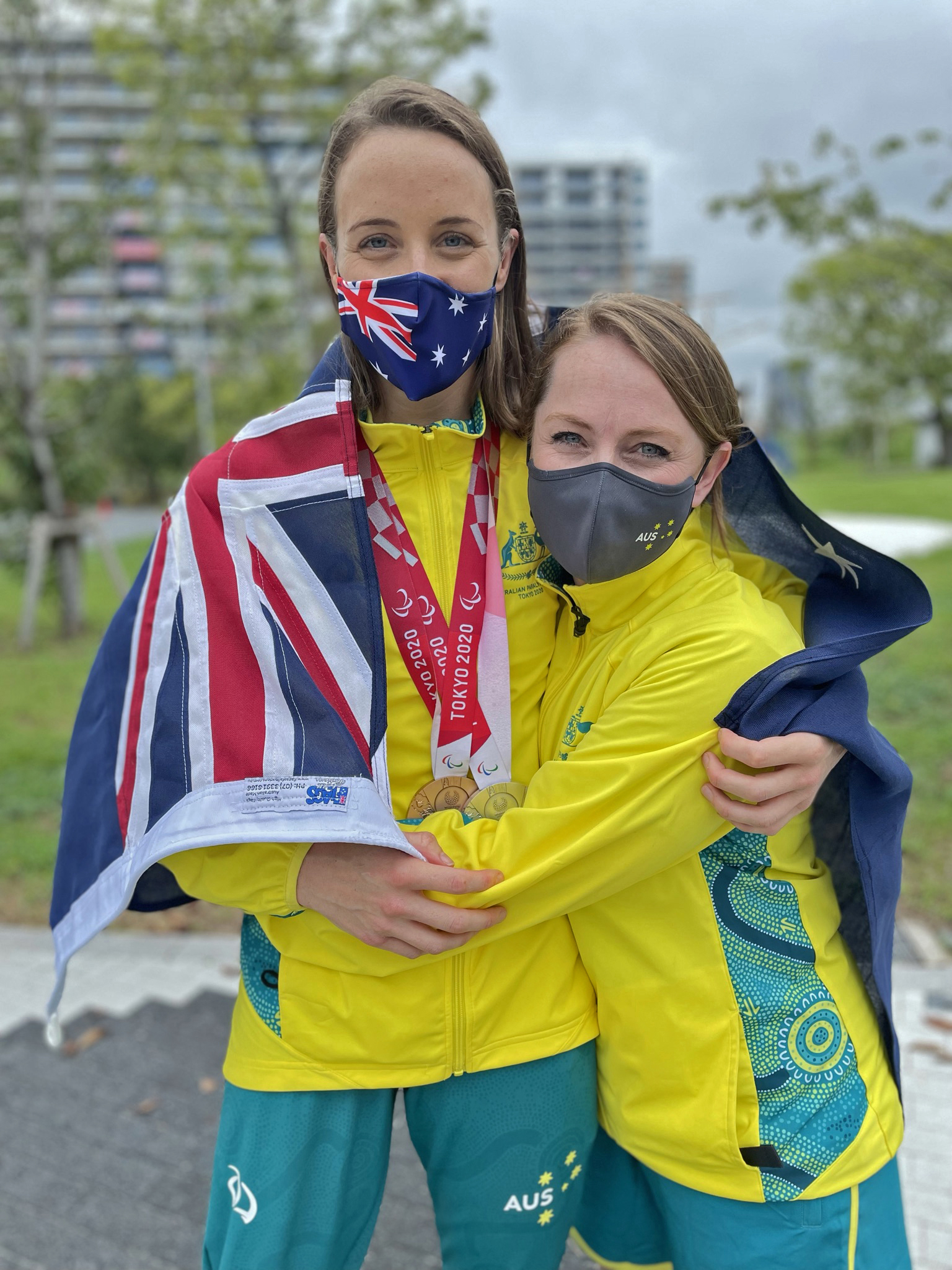
McLoughlin (right) with 2020 Tokyo Paralympics Closing Ceremony flag bearer Ellie Cole

McLoughlin has been involved in managing Australian Paralympic Teams:

- 2012 – Deputy Chef de Mission (Operations) — Australian Team at the 2012 Summer Paralympics.
- 2016 – Chef de Mission — Australian Team at the 2016 Summer Paralympics. First female to hold this position.
- 2020 – Chef de Mission Australian Team at the 2020 Summer Paralympics.
- 2022 – Chef de Mission Australian Team at the 2022 Winter Paralympics. First female to hold this for a Winter Games.
- 2024 – Chef de Mission Australian Team at the 2024 Summer Paralympics.

Prior to the 2016 Rio Paralympics, McLoughlin, team co-captain Daniela di Toro and Tim Matthews created 'The Mob' to build team spirit.

After 17 years, McLoughlin departed Paralympics Australia in September 2026. During her time at Paralympics Australia, she was "a passionate advocate for Para athletes and Paralympic alumni, helping to establish significant initiatives including the Paralympic Pin Project and PA’s Athlete Commission to elevate the voice of Para athletes as the Paralympic movement continues to evolve".

== Recognition ==
- 2016 – Australian Institute of Sport Awards - AIS Leadership Award
- 2017 – International Paralympic Committee Best Official Award at the 2016 Summer Paralympics.
