= Zion (film) =

2018 documentary film

- Directed by: Floyd Russ
- Starring: Zion Clark; Gilbert Donahue; Kimberly Clark
- Distributed by: Netflix
- Release date: August 10, 2018
- Running time: 12 minutes
- Country: United States
- Language: English

Zion is a 2018 short documentary film following Zion Clark, born without legs, growing up in foster care and becoming a wrestler.

The documentary was released on Netflix on August 10, 2018.
