= Chris Nunn =

Australian athletics coach

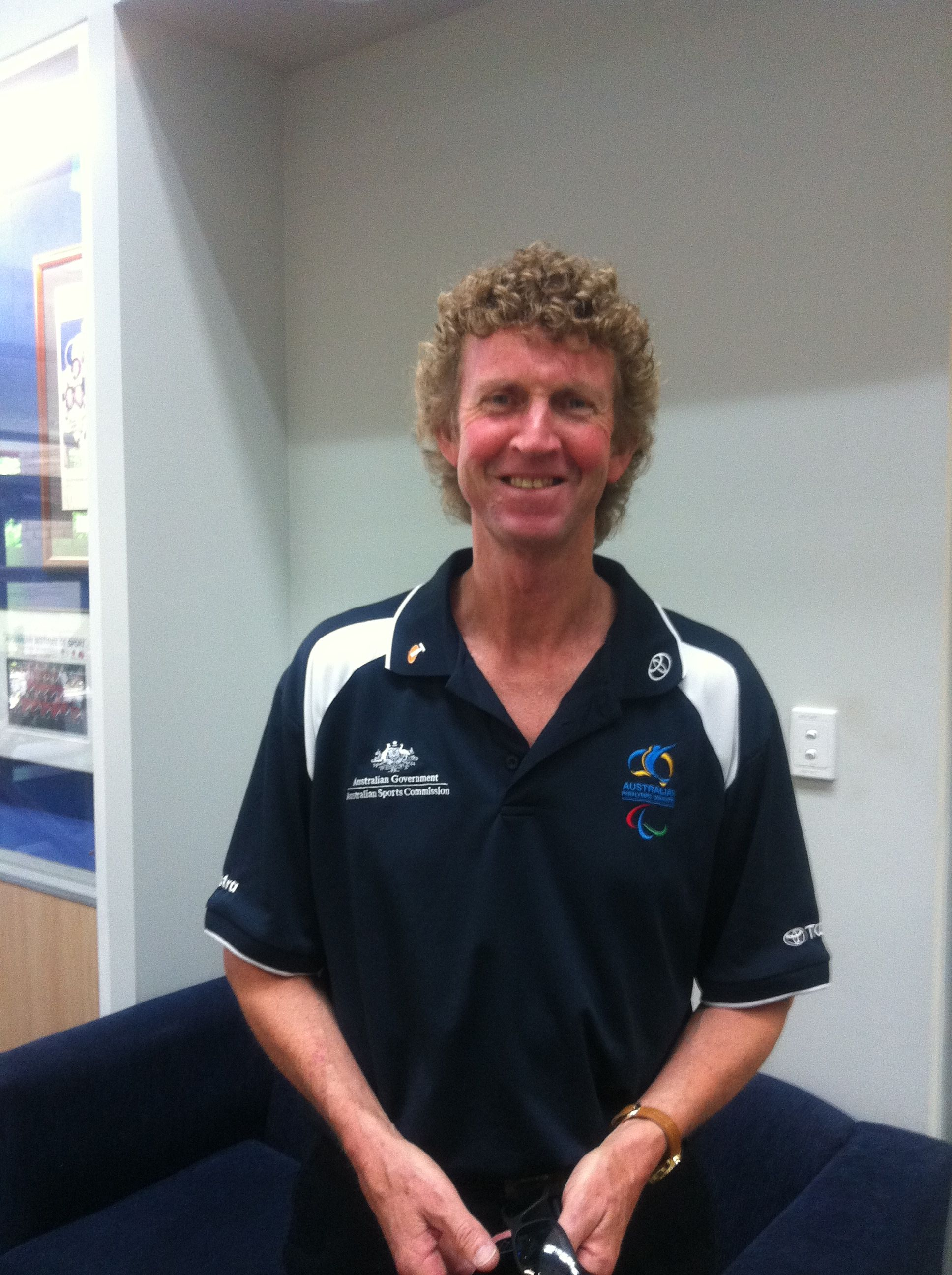
- Nunn at the Australian Institute of Sport on 11 November 2011

Personal information
- Nationality: Australia
- Born: 18 December 1958 (age 67) Maffra, Victoria

Sport
- Sport: Track and field
- Now coaching: Head Coach of the Australian Paralympic athletics team

Christopher John Nunn, OAM (born 18 December 1958) is an Australian athletics coach. He was the head coach of the Australian athletics team at the 2000 Sydney Paralympics.

== Personal life ==
He was born in Maffra, Victoria on 18 December 1958 and lived his first eight years in the nearby town of Heyfield. Nunn has a brother and two sisters and in 1976, his family moved to a farm called Leura Hill near Myponga in South Australia. He attended Yankalilla Area School, his interest in sport, particularly athletics, was heightened through the school's physical education teacher, Lance Rosser. After leaving school, he worked as an insurance clerk for two years in Adelaide. In addition, he and athletics friend Robin Gorringe coached athletics during the school holidays.

In 1985, he graduated with a Bachelor of Education in physical education and biology at the South Australian College of Advanced Education, now the University of South Australia. In 1990, after teaching for four years in several South Australian high schools, Chris and his new partner Vicki opened a general store in Port Vincent. With wife Vicki, he has four children; he was previously married to Olympic athlete Glynis Nunn (née Saunders). Chris Nunn has stated that the greatest influences on his life have been his parents, Lance Rosser and Dr John Daly, Australian athletics Olympic coach.

Chris and his wife Vicki are heavily involved in local athletics.

== Athletics career ==
In 1981, he moved to Brisbane to be closer to his partner and athlete Glynis Nunn (née Saunders). Due to the lack of coaching in Brisbane, they returned to Adelaide. He won national title medals in men's 110m hurdles and decathlon. He and Glynis competed at the 1982 Commonwealth Games in Brisbane. He competed in the men's decathlon but withdrew during the event due to injury. At the 1984 Olympic Games in Los Angeles, his wife Glynis won the gold medal in the women's heptathlon. In the lead up to the Games, he coached his wife in shot put and javelin. He retired from competitive athletics in 1989.

== Paralympic career ==
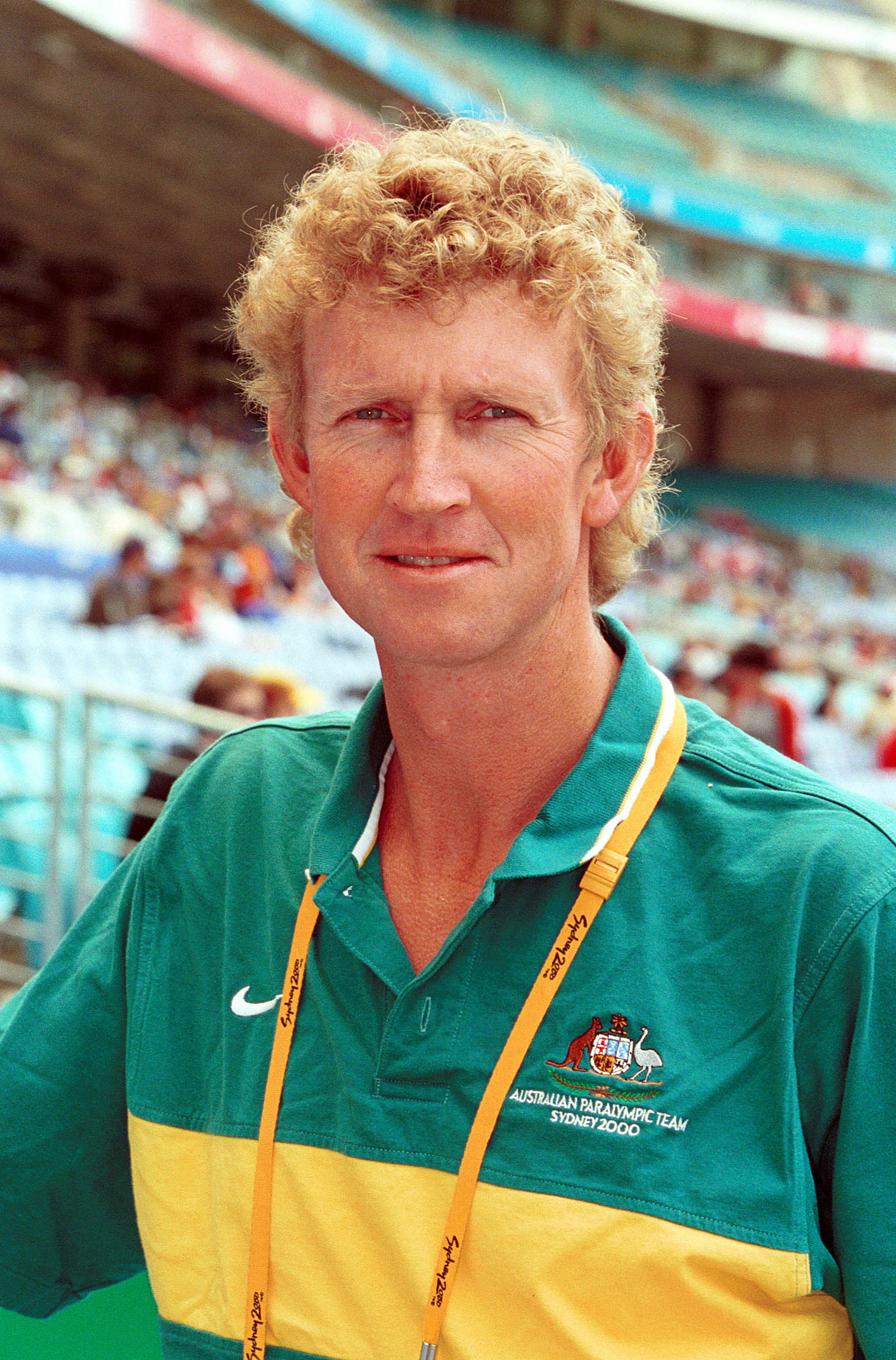
Portrait of Nunn at the 2000 Summer Paralympics

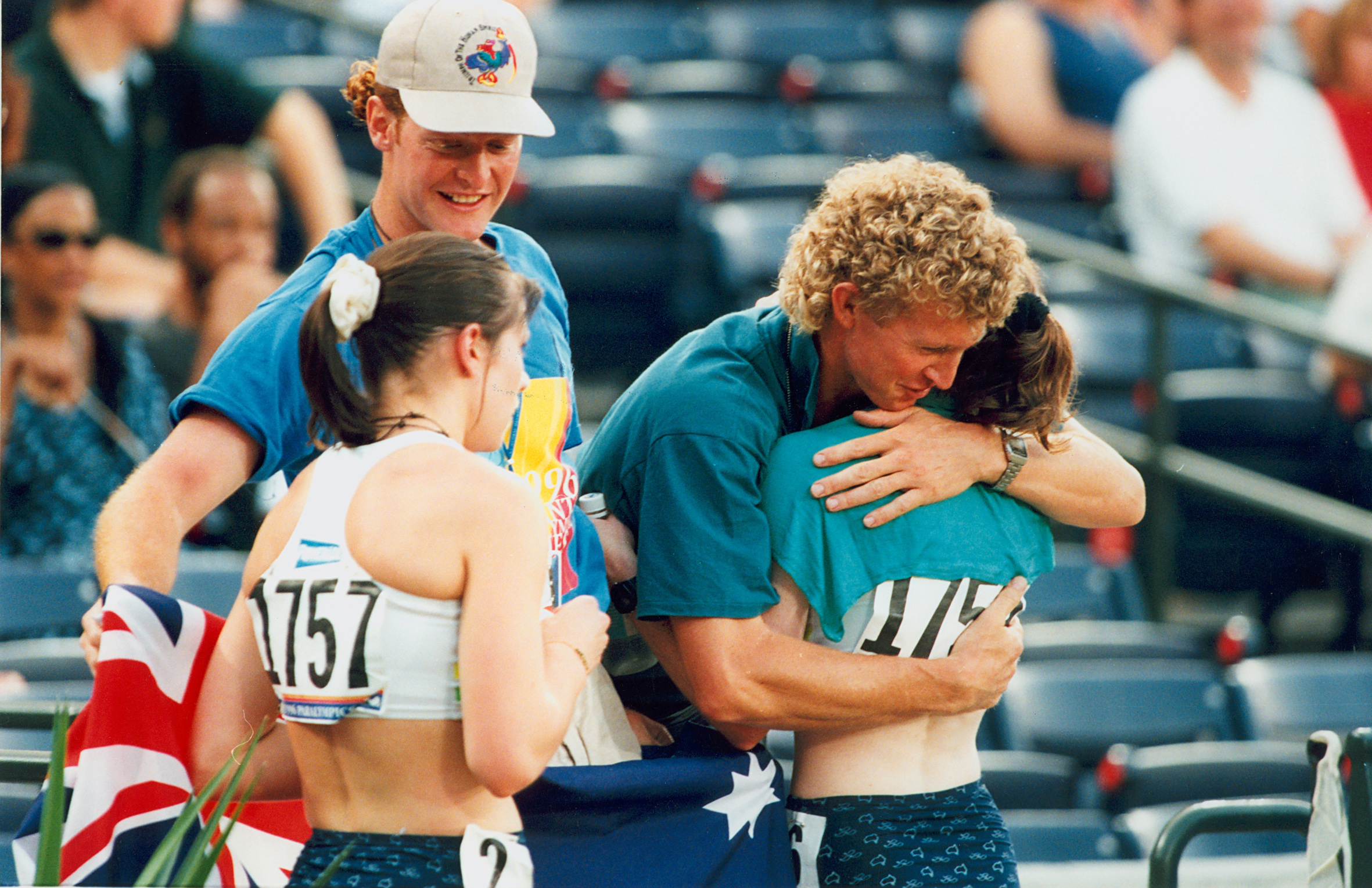
Australian athletics coaches Brett Jones (left) and Chris Nunn congratulate athletes Lisa Llorens (left, bronze medallist) and Sharon Rackham (gold medallist) after the T20 200m at the 1996 Summer Paralympics

Nunn attended the 1988 Summer Paralympics in Seoul as a support coach for amputee track and field athletes. In December 1990, he was offered a part-time coaching position in the new Athletes with a Disability program at the Australian Institute of Sport (AIS). In conjunction with this position, he was contracted to write the book Coaching Amputee Athletes. He held this position for five years before being promoted to head coach of the program in 1996. Nunn has stated that he was the first paid athletics with a disability coach in the world. He has directly coached notable Australian athletes – John Eden, Hamish MacDonald, Rodney Nugent and David Evans and advised many other leading Australian Paralympic athletes. He attended four successive Paralympic Games from 1988 to 2000 as an athletics coach and was head athletics coach at the 2000 Sydney Games. At the 2000 Games, the Australian athletics team won 35 gold, 15 silver and 16 bronze medals. In November 2000, he was appointed head coach of the Australian Institute of Sport Athletics program. Nunn's appointment resulted in the integration of athletes with a disability into the AIS Athletics program. In 2002, he was awarded a medal of the Order of Australia for services as a coach of athletes with a disability, particularly Australian Paralympic athletes.

In 2003, Athletics Australia and the AIS decided to restructure the AIS program and appointed a high performance manager. Nunn's position was downgraded to senior throws coach and he subsequently left the AIS. Whilst at the AIS, Nunn played a significant role in establishing, developing and gaining acceptance of high performance programs for athletes with a disability. In 2004, he established a King's Swim School in the Canberra suburb of Macgregor. Nunn returned to high performance sport in 2009 when he was appointed manager of high performance, Australian Paralympic Committee. He still plays an active role in junior sport as a coach at Ginninderra Tiger Athletics.

In November 2013, Nunn was appointed chef de mission for the Australian Team for the 2014 Sochi Winter Paralympics. He replaced Kate McLoughlin who stepped down due to family reasons.

== Recognition ==
- 1994, 1996, 1998 – Australian Coaching Council Individual Coach Award Finalist
- 1996 – Australian Coaching Council Eunice Gill Award
- 1998 – Australian Paralympic Coach of the Year
- Confederation of Australian Sport Dawn Fraser Award
- 1994 to 1996 – Chairman of the Athletics Committee of the International Sports Organisation for the Disabled
- 2000 – Australian Sports Medal
- 2002 – Medal of the Order of Australia
- 2003 – Rotary Clubs of Canberra and Woden Paul Harris Fellowship
- 2015 - ACT Sport Hall of Fame inductee
