= Spencer West =

American motivational speaker and disability advocate

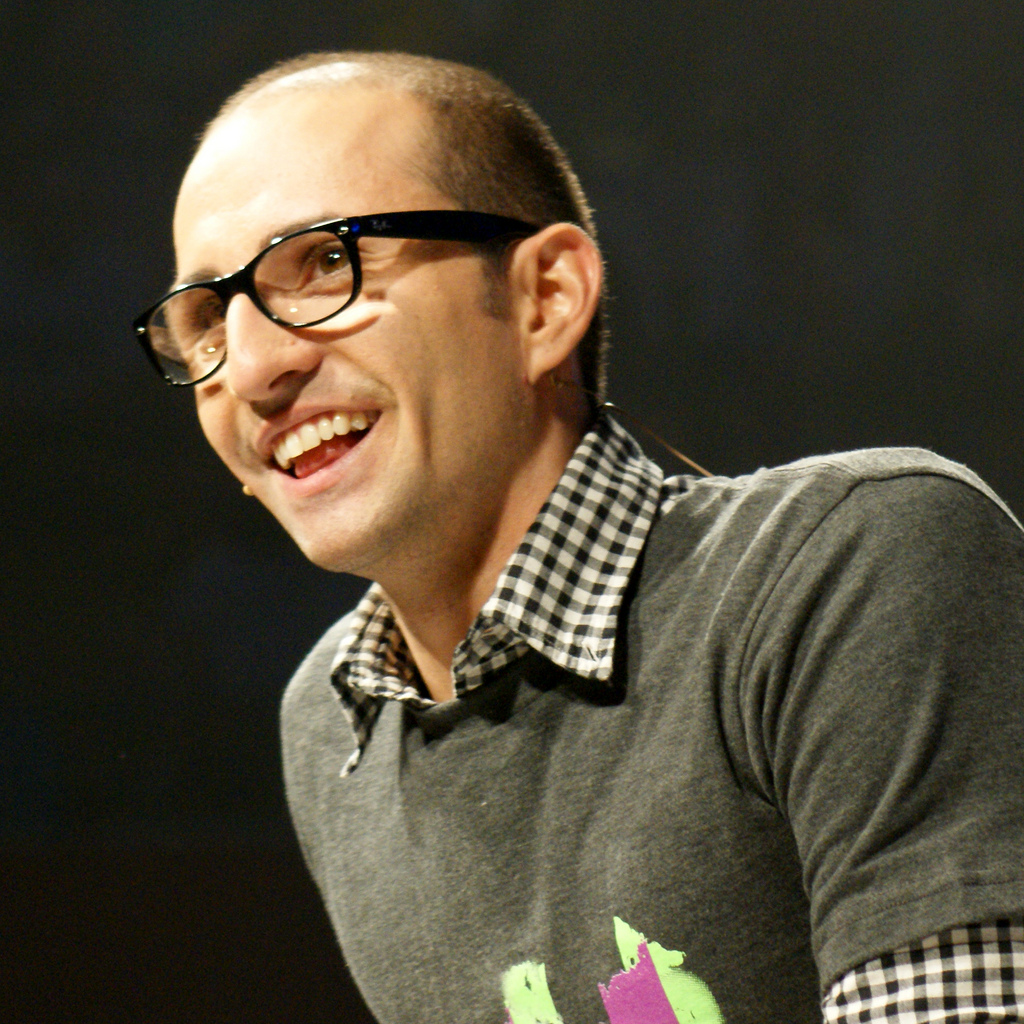
- West in 2011
- Born: 1981 (age 44–45); Rock Springs, Wyoming, U.S.
- Education: Westminster College
- Occupations: Motivational speaker, disability advocate
- Website: www.spencer2thewest.com

Spencer West (born 1981) is an American motivational speaker and disability advocate. West became an amputee after being born with sacral agenesis. He speaks about overcoming adversity and uses social media to advocate for the disability justice movement and the LGBTQ community.

== Early life and education ==
Spencer West was born in 1981, in Rock Springs, Wyoming, to Tonette and Kenny West. He has a sister named Annie.

West was born with a birth defect, sacral agenesis, causing his spine and legs to not work properly. When he was three years old, his legs were amputated to his knees. Prosthetics did not work, so doctors removed his legs when West was five years old. He learned to move around using his hands and a wheelchair. He was bullied as a child for his disability.

West graduated from Rock Springs High School, where he was a cheerleader. He earned a degree in communications from Westminster College.

== Career ==
West moved to Phoenix, Arizona and worked as an operations manager at a salon and spa. He volunteered at a TV newsroom. In 2008, West traveled to Kenya with a friend to support the Free the Children's school building effort. The trip inspired West to share his personal experiences as an amputee. He joined ME to WE as an ambassador. At the suggestion of Craig Kielburger, West climbed Mount Kilimanjaro with his friends David Johnson and Alex Meers in June 2012. The trio fundraised over $500,000 in support of Free the Children charity to provide clean water to 100,000 people in East Africa. West is a motivational speaker and shares his personal and medical story. He speaks at schools and to corporations about overcoming adversity. After meeting singer Demi Lovato at a charity event, in 2014, West was an opening speaker during the Demi World Tour.

The COVID-19 pandemic impacted West's advocacy efforts; he had previously traveled 200 days a year as a speaker. West developed a following on TikTok where he posts about the disability justice movement and his personal experiences as a gay amputee.

== Personal life ==
West resides in Toronto. He applied for Canadian citizenship after living there for 4 years. West has tennis elbow due to using his arms to walk. He is gay and advocates for disabled members in the LGBTQ community.

== Selected works ==
- West, Spencer (2011). Standing Tall: My Journey. Greystone Books. ISBN 978-1-55365-952-5.
