= Currarino syndrome =

- Other names: Currarino triad
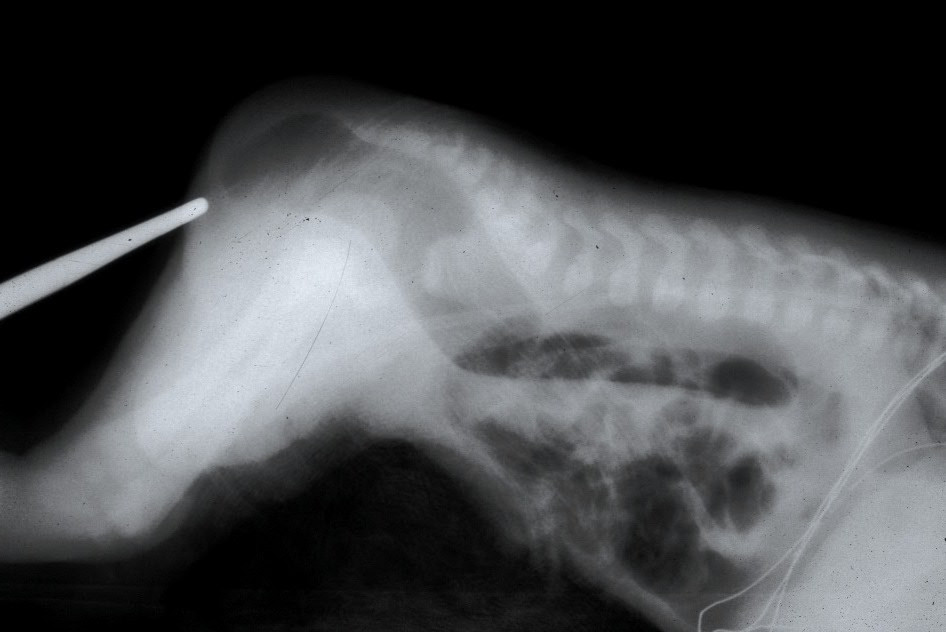
- An X-ray showing Imperforate anus

Currarino syndrome is an inherited congenital disorder where either the sacrum (the fused vertebrae forming the back of the pelvis) is not formed properly, or there is a mass in the presacral space in front of the sacrum, and there are malformations of the anus or rectum. It occurs in approximately 1 in 100,000 people.

Anterior sacral meningocele is the most common presacral mass in patients with Currarino syndrome, occurring in 60% of cases. Its presence may significantly affect the surgical management of these patients. Other potential presacral masses include presacral teratoma and enteric cyst. Presacral teratoma usually is considered to be a variant of sacrococcygeal teratoma. However, the presacral teratoma that is characteristic of the Currarino syndrome may be a distinct kind.

== Genetics ==
Currarino syndrome has an autosomal dominant pattern of inheritance

The disorder is an autosomal dominant genetic trait caused by a mutation in the HLXB9 homeobox gene. In 2000 the first large series of Currarino cases was genetically screened for HLXB9 mutations, and it was shown that the gene is specifically causative for the syndrome, but not for other forms of sacral agenesis. The study was published in the American Journal of Human Genetics.

== Diagnosis ==
Diagnosis of Currarino syndrome is usually clinical, detecting all three elements of the triad. However, genetic testing is often used as the confirmation of diagnosis and genetic analysis of patient's family members.

== Treatment ==
Surgery of an anterior myelomeningocele is only indicated in the rare case in which the space-occupying aspect is expected to cause constipation or problems during pregnancy or delivery. Fistulas between the spinal canal and colon have to be operated on directly.

Early diagnosis and multidisciplinary assessment is recommended to plan adequate treatment.

By accurate evaluation, the correct surgical management, including neurosurgery, can be performed in a single-stage approach.

The management of Currarino syndrome is similar to the usual management of anorectal malformation (ARM) regarding the surgical approach and probably the prognosis, which mainly depends on degree of associated sacral dysplasia.

== See also ==
- Imperforate anus
