= Victoria Pendergast =

Australian F58 athletics shot put competitor (born 1991)

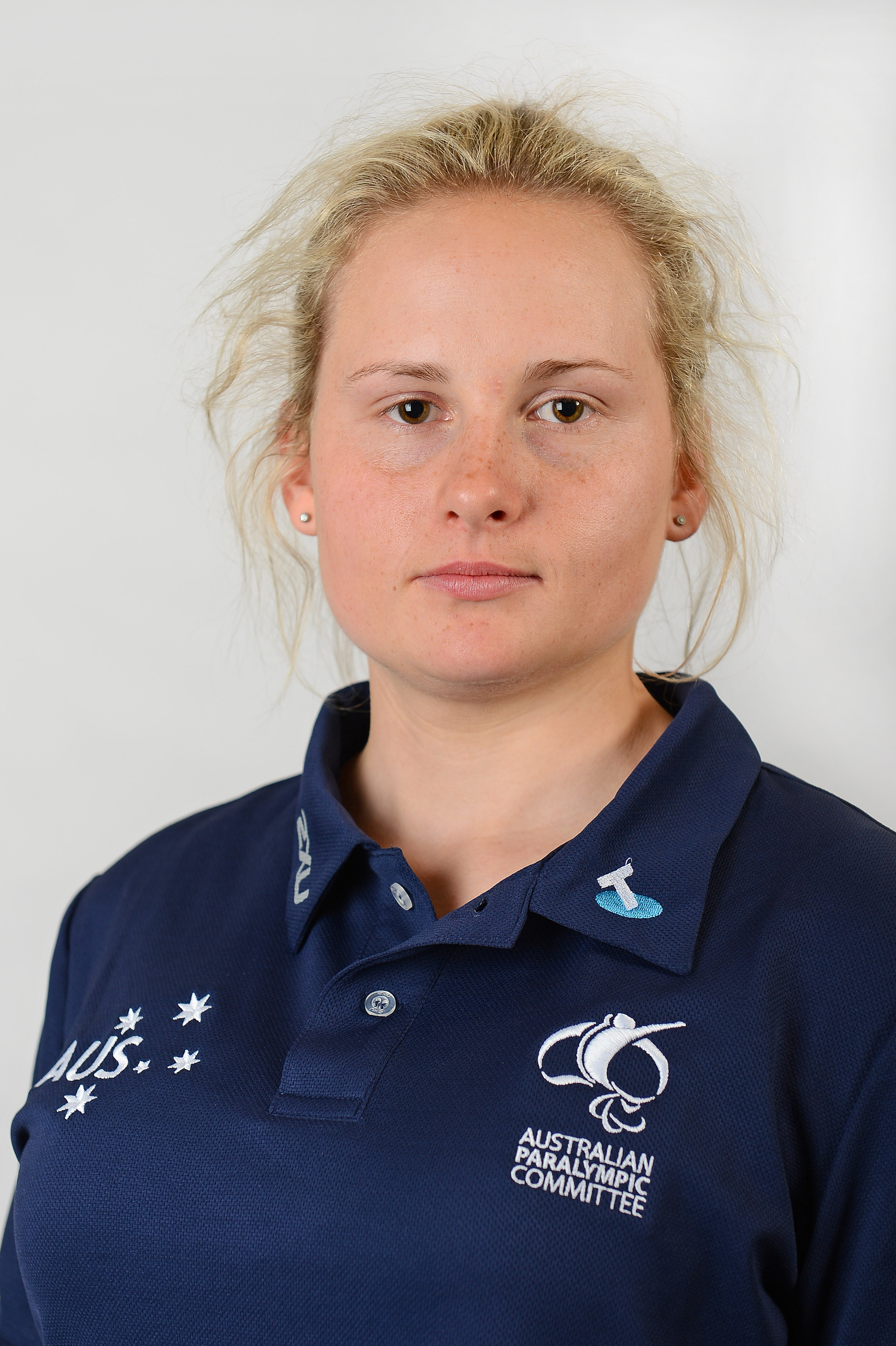
- Victoria Pendergast April 2013

Personal information
- Nationality: Australia
- Born: 25 January 1991 (age 35) Gosford, New South Wales

Sport
- Country: Australia
- Sport: Para-alpine skiing
- Disability class: LW12
- Events: Downhill; Super-G; Giant Slalom; Slalom

Victoria Pendergast (born 25 January 1991) is an Australian F58 athletics shot put competitor and LW12.1 classified Para-alpine skier. When she competed at the 2014 Winter Paralympics in Sochi, she became Australia's first female sit skier at the Winter Paralympics. She competed in two events, finishing seventh in women's slalom sit-ski and tenth in the women's giant slalom sit-ski. She also won a silver and a bronze medal in the slalom and super-G at the 2013 North America Cup, and a bronze medal in the giant slalom at the 2013 IPC World Cup in Thredbo.

== Personal ==
Victoria Pendergast was born in Gosford, New South Wales on 25 January 1991. She has sacral agenesis, and was born missing the lower part of her spine. She attended Loreto Normanhurst, and in 2013 she graduated with a degree in business and marketing from the University of Technology, Sydney. In early 2014, she was working as a telemarketer. She is an F58 classified shot put competitor who finished 8th in the Girls Shot Put Disability Open at the 2004 Schools Athletics Championships.

== Skiing ==
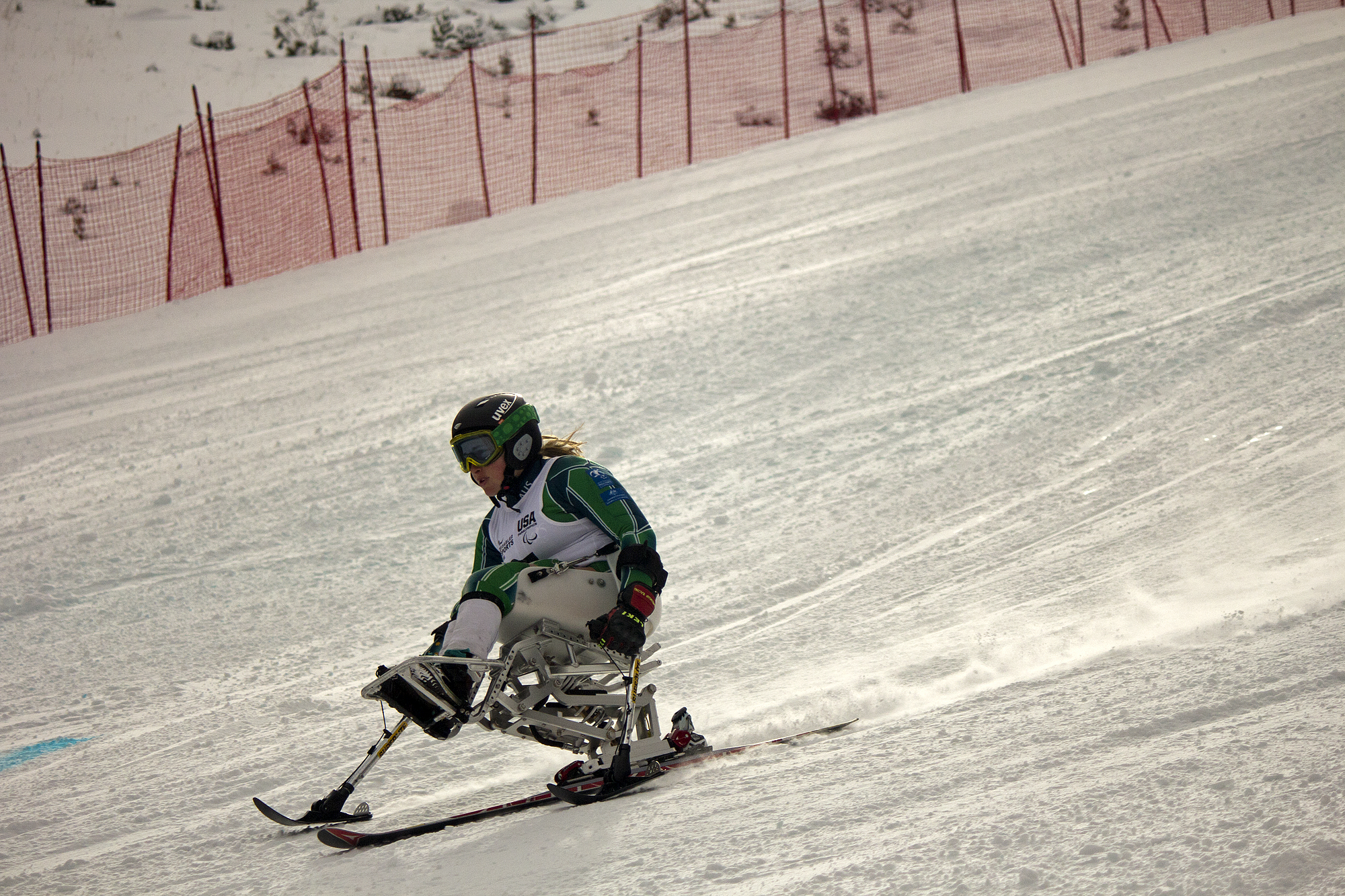
Victoria Pendergast competing in the Super G during the second day of the 2012 IPC Nor Am Cup at Copper Mountain

Pendergast is an LW12.1 classified skier, the classification for athletes "with good sitting balance... and double above knee limb loss." She was spotted on the slopes by officials from Disabled Winter Sports Australia during a family ski holiday. This led to her participation in Athlete Development Programs run by Disabled Winter Sports Australia. Born missing the lower part of her spine, she is suited to sit-skiing and embraced hurtling down a mountain at 80 kilometres per hour (50 mph) in a custom built sled. She made her international debut at the New Zealand Winter Games in 2010.

During the North American 2010/2011 skiing season, Pendergast was based in Avon, Colorado, and competed in eight races, where she earned four bronze medals and a silver medal, and finished the season ranked 66th. That season, she also participated in a 2-month long national development team training camp in Colorado. As a member of Australia's development team, she competed at a competition in December 2012 at Copper Mountain, and at the 2012 Japan Para Alpine Ski Championships in the women's sitting super-G event.

Pendergast won a silver and bronze medal in the slalom and super G at the 2013 North America Cup, and a bronze medal in the giant slalom at the 2013 IPC World Cup in Thredbo. By February 2014, she was ranked 12th in the world in downhill and giant slalom, and 13th in slalom and super-G.

At the 2014 Winter Paralympics in Sochi, Pendergast became Australia's first ever female sit skier at the Winter Paralympics. She competed in two events, finishing seventh in the women's slalom sit-ski and tenth in the women's giant slalom sit-ski.

Pendergast competed in three Women's Sitting events at the 2015 IPC Alpine Skiing World Championships in Panorama, Canada. She finished sixth in the Slalom but did not finish the Super-G and Giant Slalom.

At the 2018 Winter Paralympics, her second Games, she finished fourth in the Women's Downhill Sitting and eighth in the Women's Giant Slalom.

At the 2019 World Para Alpine Skiing Championships in Kranjska Gora, Slovenia, she competed in two events but failed to finish.

She announced her retirement from alpine skiing in September 2020.
