= Sirenomelia =

Rare congenital deformity in which the legs are fused together

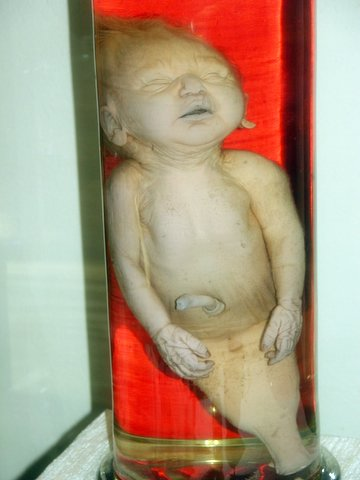
- Sirenomelia, Lyon natural history and anatomy museum
- Specialty: Medical genetics
- Symptoms: Fused legs, Renal agenesis, Urinary retention
- Complications: Malformations of organs
- Usual onset: In utero
- Causes: See Causes
- Risk factors: Maternal diabetes
- Treatment: Surgery
- Prognosis: Usually die in infancy
- Frequency: 0.0001%
- Deaths: ?

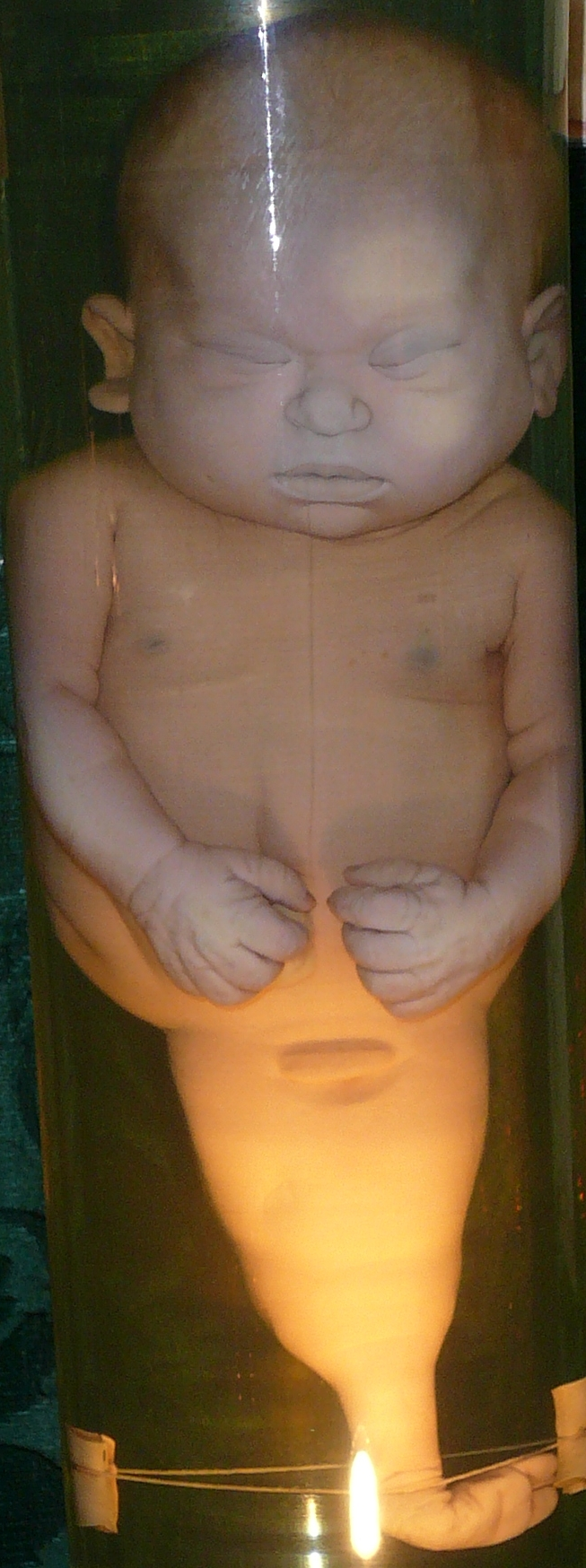
Sirenomelia

Sirenomelia, also called mermaid syndrome, is a rare congenital deformity in which the legs are fused together, giving the appearance of a mermaid's tail, hence the nickname.

== Classification ==
Classification of sirenomelia by the presence or absence of bones within the lower limb. I) all bones of thigh and lower leg present II) fused fibula III) fibula absent IV) partially fused femur, fused fibula V) partially fused femur VI) fused femur, fused tibia VII) fused femur, tibia absent

Sirenomelia is classified by the skeletal structure of the lower limb, ranging from class I, where all bones are present and only the soft tissues are fused, to class VII where the only bone present is a fused femur.

It has also been classified as an expanded part of the VACTERL association and as a form of caudal regression syndrome.

== Presentation ==
Sirenomelia is mainly characterized by the fusion of both legs with rotation of the fibula. It may include the absence of the lower spine, as well as abnormalities of the pelvis and renal organs. It was previously thought to be a severe form of sacral agensis/caudal regression syndrome, but more recent research confirms that these two conditions are not related.

In general, the more severe cases of limb fusion correlate with more severe dysplasia in the pelvis. Rather than the two iliac arteries present in fetuses with complete renal agenesis, fetuses with sirenomelia display no branching of the abdominal aorta, which is always absent.

Associated defects recorded in cases of sirenomelia include neural tube defects (rachischisis, anencephaly, and spina bifida), holoprosencephaly, hypoplastic left heart syndrome, other heart defects, esophageal atresia, omphalocele, intestinal malrotation, persistent cloaca, and other limb defects (most commonly absence of the radius).

== Causes ==
The ultimate cause of sirenomelia is a subject of debate.

The first hypothesis of its origin was developed in 1927 and proposed that a lack of blood supply to the lower limbs during their development is responsible for the defect. This "vascular steal" hypothesis was developed in response to the observed absence or severe underdevelopment of the aorta below the umbilical artery, which "steals" the blood supply from the lower limbs.

Other hypotheses involve an insult to the embryo between 28 and 32 days affecting the caudal mesoderm, a teratogen exposure affecting the neural tube during neurulation, and a defect in the twinning process that either stops the process of caudal differentiation or generates a second primitive streak.

Maternal diabetes mellitus has been associated with caudal regression syndrome and sirenomelia, although a few sources question this association. Prenatal cocaine exposure has also been suggested as an association with sirenomelia.

=== Genetics ===
In animal models, several genes have been found to cause or be associated with sirenomelia. The srn (siren) gene is observed to cause hindlimb fusion in homozygous mice. Mice with knockouts or mutations in both tsg1 and bmp7 will also have hindlimb fusion.

== Diagnosis ==
Though obvious at birth, sirenomelia can be diagnosed as early as 14 weeks gestation on prenatal ultrasound. When there is low amniotic fluid around the fetus (oligohydramnios), the diagnosis is more difficult.

== Prognosis ==
Sirenomelia is usually fatal. Many pregnancies with a sirenomelic fetus spontaneously miscarry. One-third to one-half of infants are stillborn, with all but a few dying in the neonatal period.

In cases of monoamniotic twins where one is affected, the twin with sirenomelia is protected from Potter sequence (particularly pulmonary hypoplasia and abnormal facies) by the normal twin's production of amniotic fluid.

== Epidemiology ==
This condition is found in approximately one out of every 100,000 live births; studies produce rates from 1 in 68,741 to 1 in 97,807. It is 100 to 150 times more likely in identical (monozygotic) twins than in singletons or fraternal twins. Sirenomelia is not associated with any ethnic background, but fetuses with sirenomelia are more likely to be male.

== Etymology ==
The word sirenomelia derives from the ancient Greek word seirēn, referring to the mythological Sirens, who were sometimes depicted as mermaids, and melos, meaning "limb".

== History ==
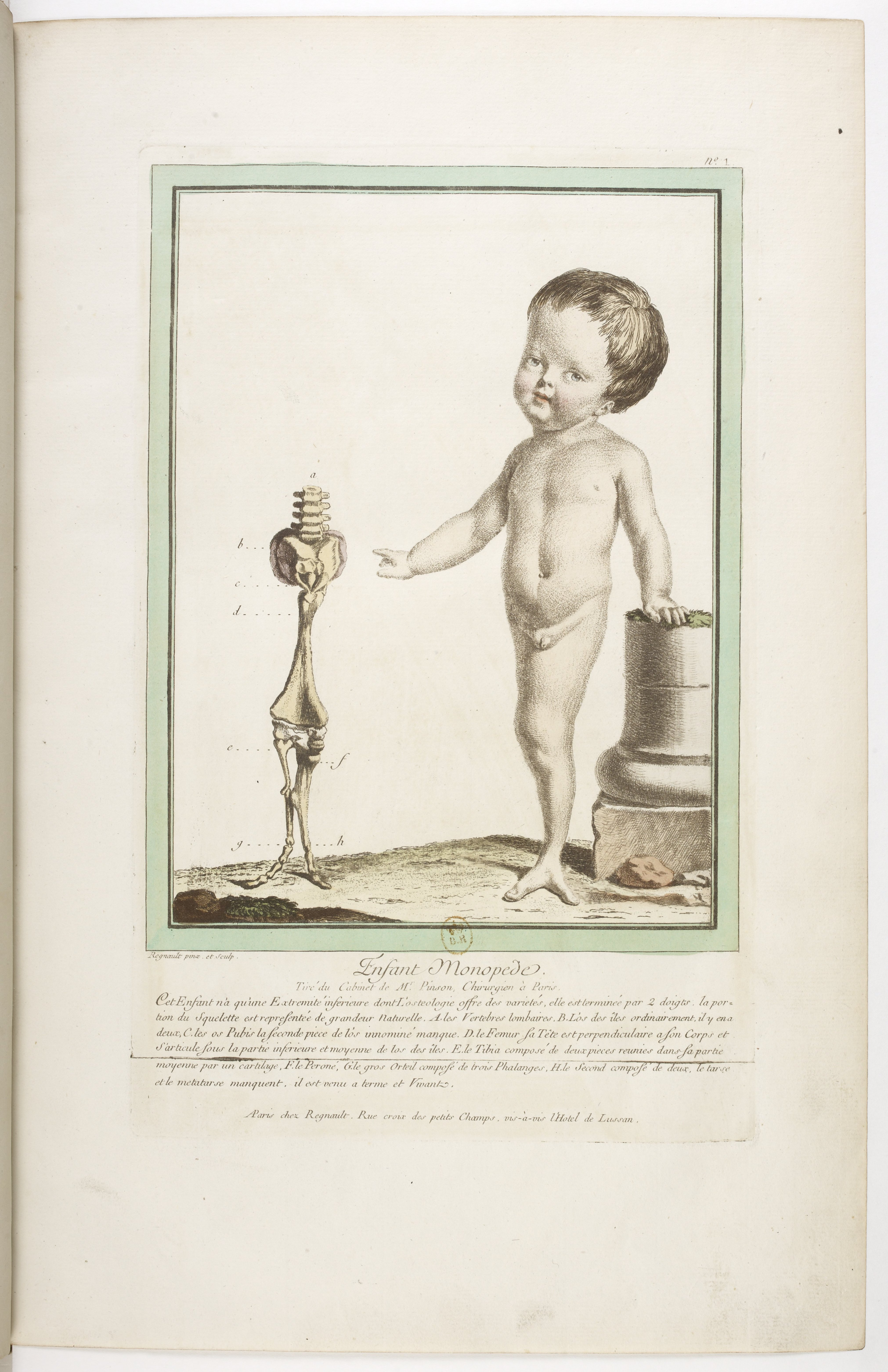
Sirenomelia in Les écarts de la nature, 1775

Sirenomelia was first reported in 1542. In 1927, Otto Kampmeier discovered the association between sirenomelia and single umbilical artery.

=== Notable individuals ===
Only a few individuals who had some functioning kidney tissues have survived the neonatal period.

==== Tiffany Yorks ====
Tiffany Yorks of Clearwater, Florida (May 7, 1988 – February 24, 2016) underwent successful surgery in order to separate her legs before she was a year old. She was the longest-surviving sirenomelia patient to date. She had mobility issues due to her fragile leg bones and compensated by using crutches or a wheelchair. She died on February 24, 2016, at the age of 27.

==== Shiloh Pepin ====
Shiloh Jade Pepin (August 4, 1999 – October 23, 2009) was born in Kennebunkport, Maine, with her lower extremities fused, no bladder, no uterus, no rectum, only 6 inches of large intestine, no vagina, only one quarter of a kidney and one ovary. Her parents initially anticipated she could expect only a few months of life. At the age of four months, her natural kidney failed, and she began dialysis.

In 1998, before she was born, Elmer and Leslie had a stillborn daughter, named Molly.

A kidney transplant at age two lasted a number of years, and in 2007, a second kidney transplant was successful. She attended Consolidated Elementary School. She remained hopeful about her condition, joked often, and lived her life happily, despite her challenges, as seen in the TLC documentary Extraordinary People: Mermaid Girl. Shiloh and her family were debating surgery because of the risks involved, even though it would improve her quality of life.

Many people who have sirenomelia undergo surgery at a young age, but Shiloh was already eight years old at the time and had not undergone surgery. Shiloh was the only one of three survivors of sirenomelia without surgery for separation of the conjoined legs. She died of pneumonia on October 23, 2009, at Maine Medical Center in Portland, Maine, at the age of ten; having appeared on The Oprah Winfrey Show on September 22, 2009. Shiloh gained a following of admirers after documenting her condition on television and the internet.

==== Milagros Cerrón ====
Milagros Cerrón Arauco (April 27, 2004 – October 24, 2019) was born in Huancayo, Peru. Although most of Milagros' internal organs, including her heart and lungs, were in perfect condition, she was born with serious internal defects, including a deformed left kidney and a very small right one located very low in her body. In addition, her digestive, urinary tracts and genitals shared a single tube. This birth defect occurs during the gastrulation week (week 3) of embryonic development. Gastrulation establishes the three germ layers: ectoderm, mesoderm and endoderm. It seems that complications such as defects in the urogenital system as mentioned above can be possibly due to malformations in the intermediate mesoderm.

A four-hour operation to insert silicone bags between her legs to stretch the skin was successfully completed on February 8, 2005. A successful operation to separate her legs to just above the knee took place May 31, 2005, in a "Solidarity Hospital" in the district of Surquillo in Lima. The procedure, however, was so intensive that she became traumatized to the degree of losing her ability to form proper speech patterns, leaving her nearly mute. It is not known if this was a physiological or psychological condition. However, at Milagros' second birthday, her mother reported that she knew more than 50 words. A second operation to complete the separation up to the groin took place on September 7, 2006.

Her doctor Luis Rubio said he was pleased with the progress Milagros had made, but cautioned that she still needed 10 to 15 years of rehabilitation and more operations before she could lead a normal life, particularly reconstructive surgery to rebuild her rudimentary anus, urethra and genitalia.

Milagros' parents are from a poor village in Peru's Andes Mountains; the Solidarity Hospital had given a job to her father Ricardo Cerrón so that the family could remain in Lima, while the City of Lima pledged to pay for many of the operations.

She died on October 24, 2019, at the age of 15.
