= Caudal regression syndrome =

- Other names: Sacral regression sequence, Sacral agenesis
- Sacral agenesis
- Specialty: Medical genetics

Caudal regression syndrome, or sacral agenesis (or hypoplasia of the sacrum), is a rare congenital disorder in which the fetal development of the lower spine—the caudal portion of the spine—is abnormal. It occurs at a rate of approximately one per 60,000 live births.

Some babies are born with only minor abnormalities, compared to typical development, while some others have significant changes. Most grow up to be otherwise typical adults who have difficulty walking and incontinence.

== Signs and symptoms ==
This condition exists in a variety of forms, ranging from partial absence of the tail bone regions of the spine to absence of the lower vertebrae, pelvis and parts of the thoracic and/or lumbar areas of the spine. In some cases, where only a small part of the spine is absent, there may be no outward sign of the condition. In cases where more substantial areas of the spine are absent, there may be fused, webbed or smaller lower extremities and paralysis. Bowel and bladder control is usually affected.

== Cause ==
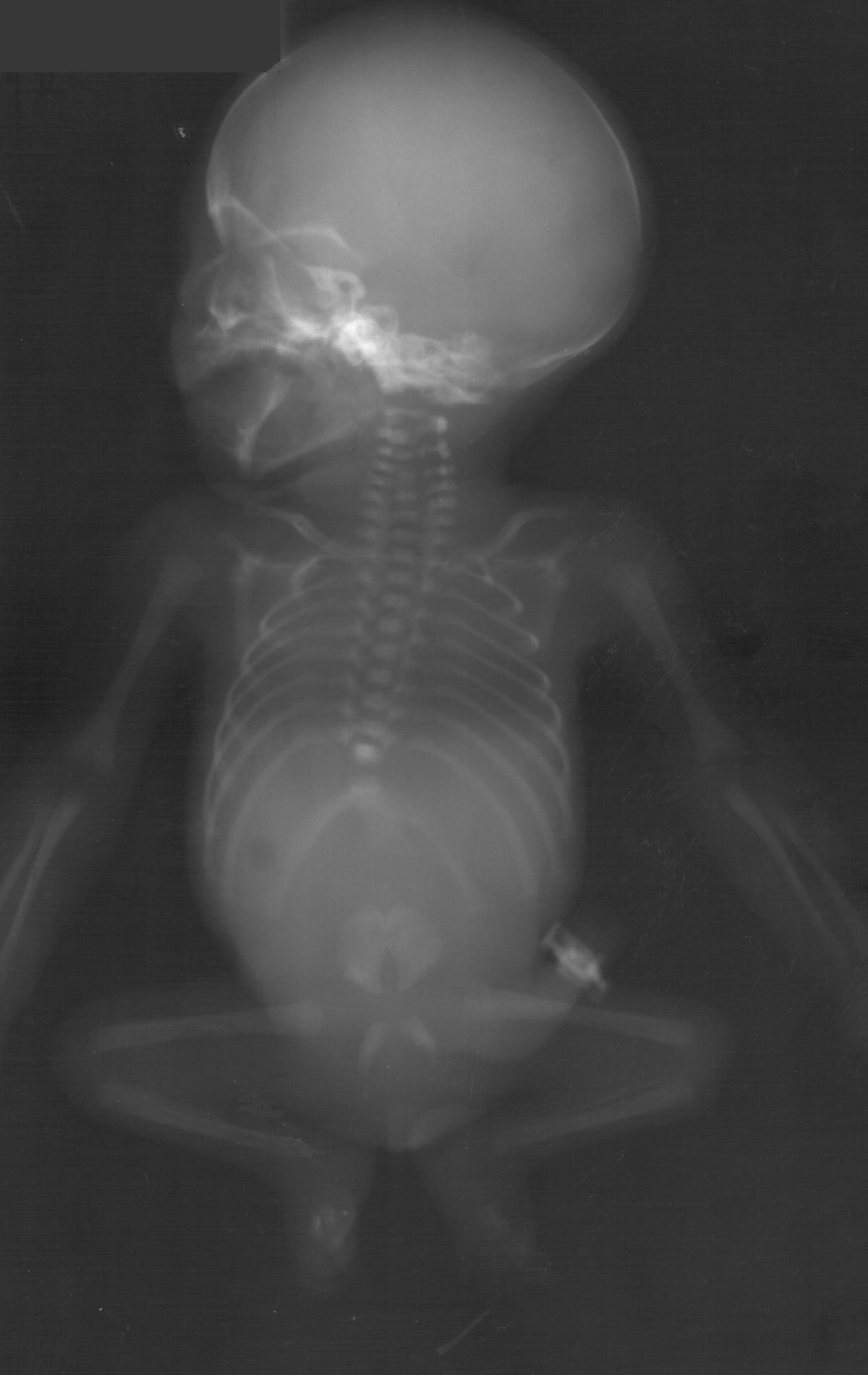
Antero-posterior radiographic view, showing missing ribs, absent lumbosacral vertebrae, hypoplastic pelvis and "frog-like" position of the lower extremities

The condition arises from some factor or set of factors present during approximately the 3rd week to 7th week of fetal development. Formation of the sacrum (lower back) and corresponding nervous system is usually nearing completion by the 4th week of development. Due to abnormal gastrulation, the mesoderm migration is disturbed. This disturbance results in symptoms varying from minor lesions of the lower vertebrae to more severe symptoms such as complete fusion of the lower limbs. While the exact cause is unknown, it has been speculated that the condition has a combination of environmental and genetic causes, and that various types of the condition may have differing causes.

Sacral agenesis syndrome (a type of caudal regression syndrome involving agenesis of the lumbar spine, sacrum, and coccyx, and hypoplasia of the lower extremities) is a well-established congenital anomaly associated with maternal diabetes mellitus. Other causes are presumably involved, as demonstrated by the rare overall incidence of caudal regression syndrome (1:60,000) compared to diabetes; however, the condition does have a greatly increased incidence among infants born to mothers with diabetes, estimated at 1 in 350 newborns of mothers with diabetes.

The dominant inherited sacral agenesis (also referred to as Currarino syndrome) is very often correlated with a mutation in the Hb9 (also called HlxB9) gene.

It was previously thought to be related to sirenomelia ("Mermaid syndrome") but has now been determined not to be related to this condition.

== Prognosis ==
There are four levels (or types) of malformation. The least severe indicates partial deformation (unilateral) of the sacrum. The second level indicates a bilateral (uniform) deformation. The most severe types involve a total absence of the sacrum.

Depending on the type of sacral agenesis, bowel or urinary bladder deficiencies may be present. A permanent colostomy may be necessary in the case of imperforate anus. Incontinence may also require some type of continence control system (e.g., self-catheterization) to be utilized. The condition often impacts the formation of the knees, legs or feet that is sometimes addressed through surgery. For some with tightly webbed, bent knees or knees that are fused straight, disarticulation surgery at the knee may be a viable option to maximize mobility options.

Before more comprehensive medical treatment was available, full amputation of the legs at the hip was often performed. More recently, the amputation (actually a disarticulation because no cutting of the bone is involved) is done at the knee for those who have bent knee positions and webbing between thigh and calf to enable more ease of mobility and better seating. Some children with knee disarticulation use prosthetic legs to walk. Prosthetics for children without substantial hip and trunk control is usually abandoned in favor of faster and easier wheelchair mobility as the child's weight and age increase. Children may walk on their hands and generally are able to climb and move about to accomplish whatever they need and want to accomplish. Children more mildly affected may have normal gait and no need for assistive devices for walking. Others may walk with bracing or crutches.

There is typically no cognitive impairment associated with this disability. Adults with this disability live independently, attend college, and have careers in various fields. In 2012, Spencer West, a man with sacral agenesis and both legs amputated, climbed Mount Kilimanjaro using only his hands. In 2021, athlete Zion Clark broke the Guinness World Record 20 m running on hands.

== Society and culture ==
=== Notable people ===
- Ghanim Al-Muftah, a Qatari businessman, opened the 2022 Mondial ceremony as well as the 2022 FIFA World Cup with Morgan Freeman
- Zion Clark, American track athlete and wrestler, 2022 Guinness World Record holder (20 m hand sprint in 4.78 seconds)
- Rebecca Dubber, New Zealand para-swimmer and Rio 2016 Paralympic bronze medalist
- Kenny Easterday, American played a fictionalized version of himself in the film Kenny
- Johnny Eck, American freak show performer
- Ethereal, American rapper and record producer
- Kurt Fearnley, Australian wheelchair racer
- Chloé Cooper Jones, American philosopher and author
- Bobby Martin, American football player
- Kevin McKee, American two-time Olympic champion and two-times world champion in sledge hockey
- Sainimili Naivalu, Fijian wheelchair table tennis medallist and disability rights activist
- Victoria Pendergast, first female Australian sit-skier at Winter Paralympics
- Jessica Rogers, American wheelchair racer and swimmer, founder and President of iSACRA (International Caudal Regression Syndrome Association)
- Rose Siggins, American actress (American Horror Story: Freak Show)
- Spencer West, American motivational speaker
- Eden Rainbow-Cooper, English Paralympic athlete
- Jin Woodman (born 2009), Australian wheelchair tennis player
