= MNX1 =

Protein-coding gene in the species Homo sapiens

Identifiers
- Aliases: MNX1, HB9, HLXB9, HOXHB9, SCRA1, motor neuron and pancreas homeobox 1
- External IDs: OMIM: 142994; MGI: 109160; GeneCards: MNX1

Gene location (Human)
| Chr. | Chromosome 7 (human) |
| Band | 7q36.3 | Start | 156,994,051 bp |
| Band | 7q36.3 | End | 157,010,663 bp |

Gene location (Mouse)
| Chr. | Chromosome 5 (mouse) |
| Band | 5|5 B1 | Start | 29,678,032 bp |
| Band | 5|5 B1 | End | 29,683,468 bp |
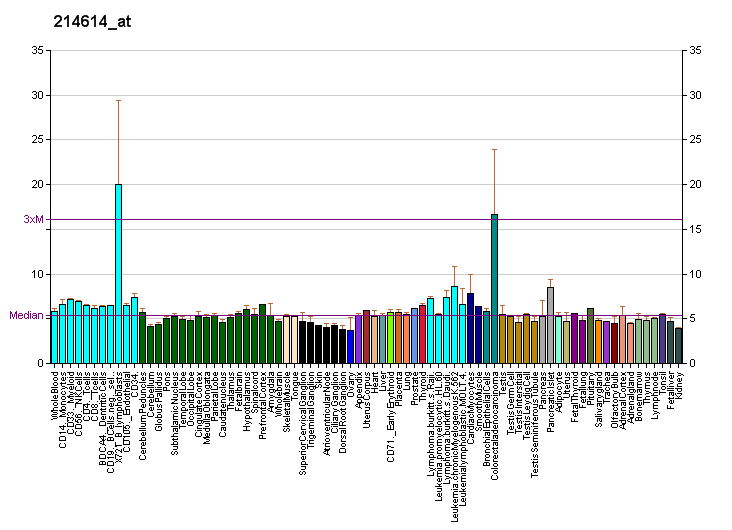
RNA expression pattern
| Bgee | Human / Mouse (ortholog); Top expressed in: body of pancreas; gonad; mucosa of transverse colon; testicle; beta cell; mucosa of sigmoid colon; duodenum; jejunal mucosa; rectum; mucosa of ileum / Top expressed in: lumbar subsegment of spinal cord; islet of Langerhans; female urethra; embryo; endoderm; notochord; embryonic organizer; tail of embryo; pharynx; neural tube; More reference expression data |
| BioGPS | More reference expression data |
Gene ontology
| Molecular function | DNA binding; sequence-specific DNA binding; DNA-binding transcription factor activity; DNA-binding transcription factor activity, RNA polymerase II-specific |
| Cellular component | nucleolus; nucleus; cytosol |
| Biological process | regulation of transcription by RNA polymerase II; humoral immune response; neuron projection morphogenesis; spinal cord motor neuron cell fate specification; transcription, DNA-templated; anatomical structure morphogenesis; endocrine pancreas development; regulation of transcription, DNA-templated |
Sources:Amigo / QuickGO
Orthologs
| Databases | NCBI: entry; OMA: entry |
| Species | Human | Mouse |
| Entrez | 3110 | 15285 |
| Ensembl | ENSG00000130675 | ENSMUSG00000001566 |
| UniProt | P50219 | A2RSX2 |
| RefSeq (mRNA) | NM_005515; NM_001165255 | NM_019944 |
| RefSeq (protein) | NP_001158727; NP_005506 | NP_064328 |
| Location (UCSC) | Chr 7: 156.99 – 157.01 Mb | Chr 5: 29.68 – 29.68 Mb |
| PubMed search |
- Wikidata
| View/Edit Human | View/Edit Mouse |

Motor neuron and pancreas homeobox 1 (MNX1), also known as Homeobox HB9 (HLXB9), is a human protein encoded by the MNX1 gene.

== Clinical significance ==
Mutations in the MNX1 gene are associated with Currarino syndrome. Upregulated expression of MNX1-AS1 long noncoding RNA predicts poor prognosis in gastric cancer.
