= Rose Siggins =

American actress

- Born: December 8, 1972; Pueblo, Colorado, U.S.
- Died: December 12, 2015 (aged 43); Denver, Colorado, U.S.
- Other names: Rose Homan; Rose Marie
- Years active: –2015
- Known for: Legless Suzi in American Horror Story
- Children: 2

Rose Marie Homan (December 8, 1972 – December 12, 2015), better known by her stage (and married) name Rose Siggins, was an American actress best known for her portrayal of Legless Suzi on American Horror Story: Freak Show.

Siggins was born with sacral agenesis, and because of this, as she recalled, "my legs were severely deformed, with the feet pointing in opposite directions." Her parents decided to have her legs amputated. According to herself, she was the only person with sacral agenesis to have carried and given birth to a baby who was not disabled. She was married and had a son, Luke, and a daughter, Shelby. She was born in Pueblo, Colorado in 1972, and died in Denver, Colorado, of an infection secondary to kidney surgery on December 12, 2015, four days after her 43rd birthday.
