= Persistent cloaca =

- Other names: cloacal malformation
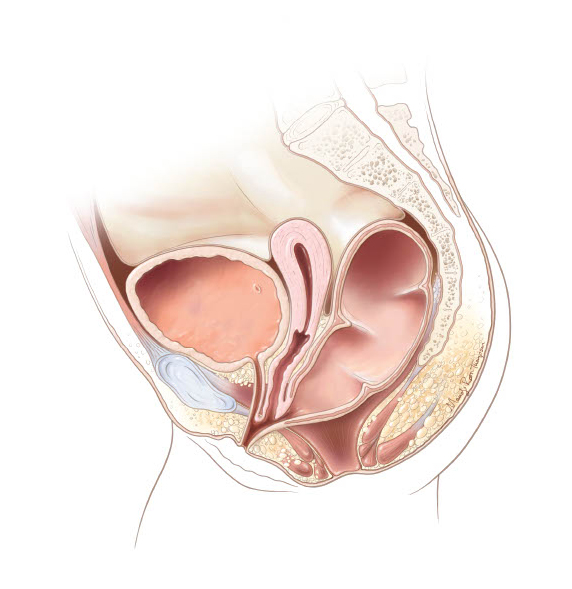
- Diagram of a female with persistent cloaca
- Specialty: Medical genetics

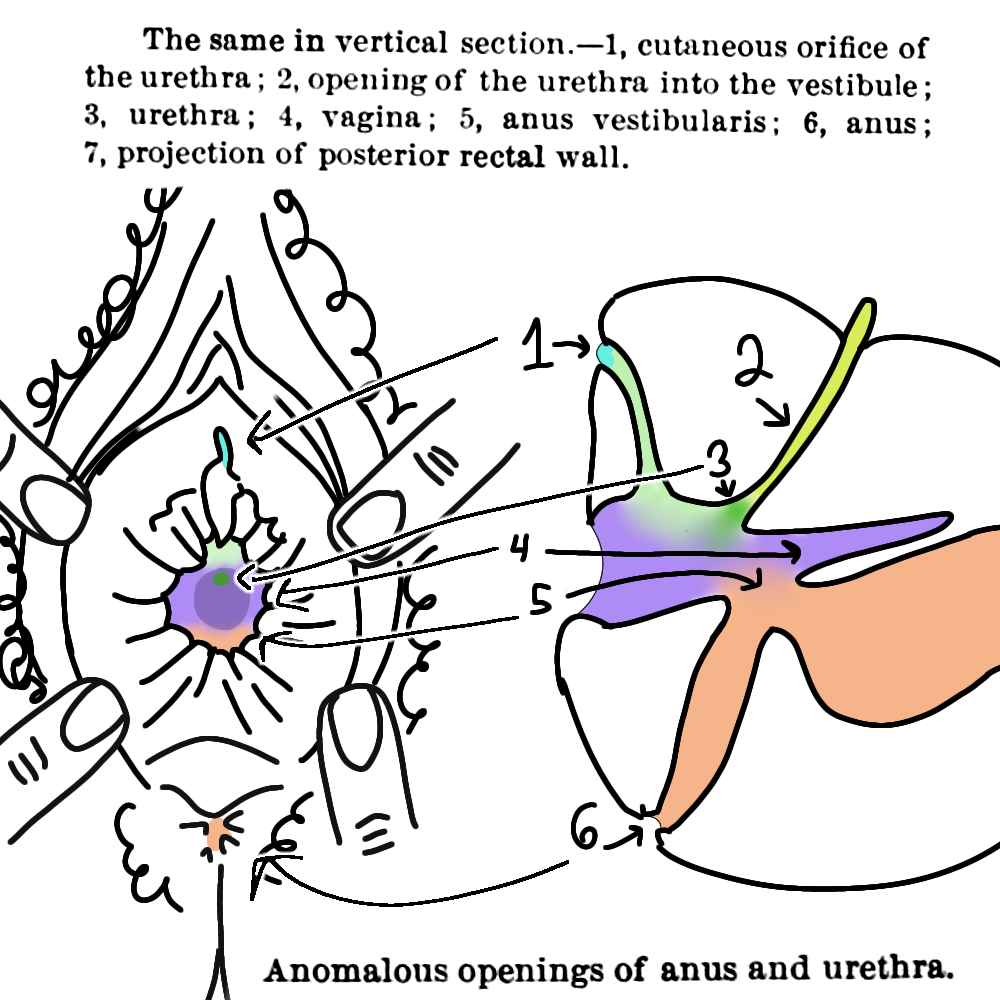
A color-coded diagram of a persistent cloaca, where the rectum, vagina, and bladder all open into the same exterior opening.

A persistent cloaca is a symptom of a complex anorectal congenital disorder, in which the rectum, vagina, and urinary tract meet and fuse, creating a cloaca, a single common channel.

== Signs and symptoms ==
Cloacas appear in a wide spectrum of variation in females born with the malformation. The severity of the condition depends on where the three tracts have joined together. The single orifice, called a common channel, may occur varying in length from 1 to 10 cm. The length of the common channel can be used to judge prognostic outcomes and technical challenges during surgical repair. A common channel less than 3 cm in length usually has good sphincter muscles and a well-developed sacrum. This type of malformation happens when the embryonic anorectal and urogenital channels fail to separate during the sixth and seventh weeks of gestational development. Cloacal malformations are rare; they only occur in approximately 1 in 50,000 live births.

== Diagnosis ==
Diagnosis of a female with a cloaca should be suspected in a female born with an imperforate anus and small looking genitalia. The diagnosis can be made clinically with tests like ultrasound, X-rays, voiding cystourethrogram (VCUG) and cloacagram. MRI of the spine and pelvis and endoscopic examinations may also be performed. Failure to identify a cloaca as being present in a newborn may be dangerous, as more than 90% have associated urological problems. The goal for treatment of a female born with cloaca is to achieve bowel control, urinary control, and sexual function, which includes menstruation, sexual intercourse, and possibly pregnancy. Cloacas probably occur in 1 in 20,000 live births.

== Treatment ==
Due to their complexity, cloacal malformations require multidisciplinary treatment from pediatric surgeons, urologists and gynecologists. Children diagnosed with this condition may also have anomalies in other organ systems and will likely require several different types of reconstructive surgeries. Depending on the severity of their condition, treatment may involve urinary, vaginal and colorectal reconstruction.

The prognostic outcomes for this type of cloaca are good for bowel control and urinary function. The surgical repair for this type of cloaca can usually be done by performing posterior sagittal approach without opening of the abdomen. A common channel longer than 3 cm in length usually has poor sphincter muscles and a poor sacrum, suggesting a prognostic outcome for bowel control and urinary function to be less likely. Common channels longer than 3 cm are generally considered more complex and more technically challenging in surgical repair.

== See also ==
- Cloaca (embryology)
- Cloaca
