= Trent Milton =

Australian Paralympic snowboarder

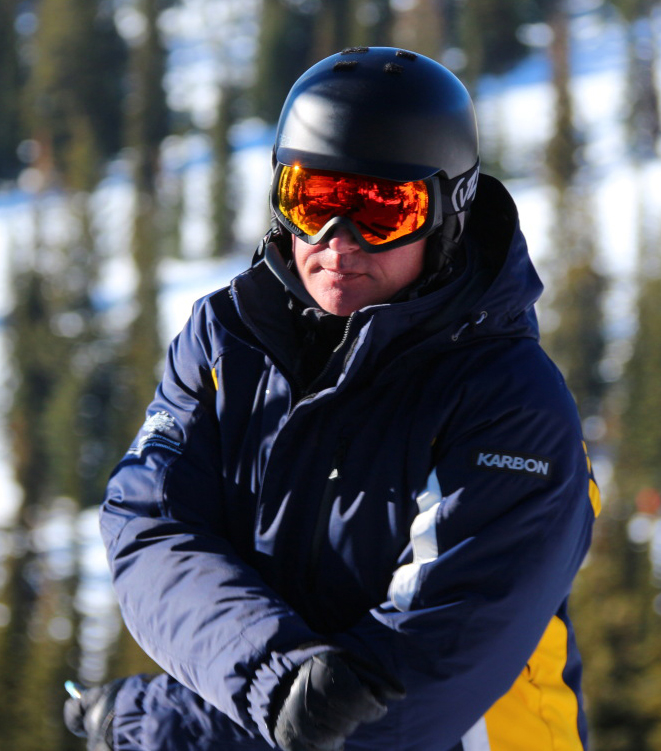
- Trent Milton January 2014

Personal information
- Born: 4 May 1972 (age 54) Newcastle, New South Wales

Sport
- Country: Australia
- Sport: Para-snowboarding
- Disability class: SB-LL

Trent Milton (born 4 May 1972) is an Australian Para-snowboarder who, at the age of 41, competed for Australia at the 2014 Winter Paralympics in Sochi. An active surfer, snowboarder, stand up paddle boarder, motocross and mountain biker, he took up para-snowboarding after a motorcycle accident that cost him his lower right leg. He made his international debut after just 18 months. After his first season resulted in fifth and sixth-place finishes, he was ranked 20th in the world. He finished 20th in the Men's Para-Snowboard Cross at the 2014 Winter Paralympic Games in Sochi.

== Personal ==
Trent Milton was born in Newcastle, New South Wales, on 4 May 1972. He currently lives in Lake Cathie, New South Wales. On 5 March 2011, a motorcycle accident on the way home from work in Port Macquarie tore off his right leg. It also led to a brain injury. Doctors considered amputating both his arms – his right arm hung by a thread – but managed to save both, which they fastened back together with steel plates. He developed post-traumatic amnesia, and spent a year in recovery.

Prior to the accident, he was an active surfer, snowboarder, stand up paddle boarder, motocrosser and mountain biker. He took up Para-snowboarding to maintain the active lifestyle that he had prior to his accident. Milton said: "I want the relationship back with my body that I had pre-injury". He stressed that the goal of competing at the Winter Paralympics played a major role in his rehabilitation.

== Skiing ==
Milton had been a professional snowboarder from age 16 to 32. With the introduction of snowboarding to the Winter Paralympics program, he set the goal of participating at the 2014 Winter Paralympics in Sochi. With the assistance of Australian Paralympic snowboard coach Peter Higgins, he made his international debut after just 18 months. His first season resulted in fifth and sixth-place finishes, giving him a ranking of 20th in the world. He was forced to withdraw from the Paralympic Test Event in Sochi in 2013 due to flu. At age 41, he was the oldest Australian competitor at the 2014 Winter Paralympics. He finished 20th in the Men's Para-Snowboard Cross.
