= Congenital limb deformities =

Malformation of the limbs

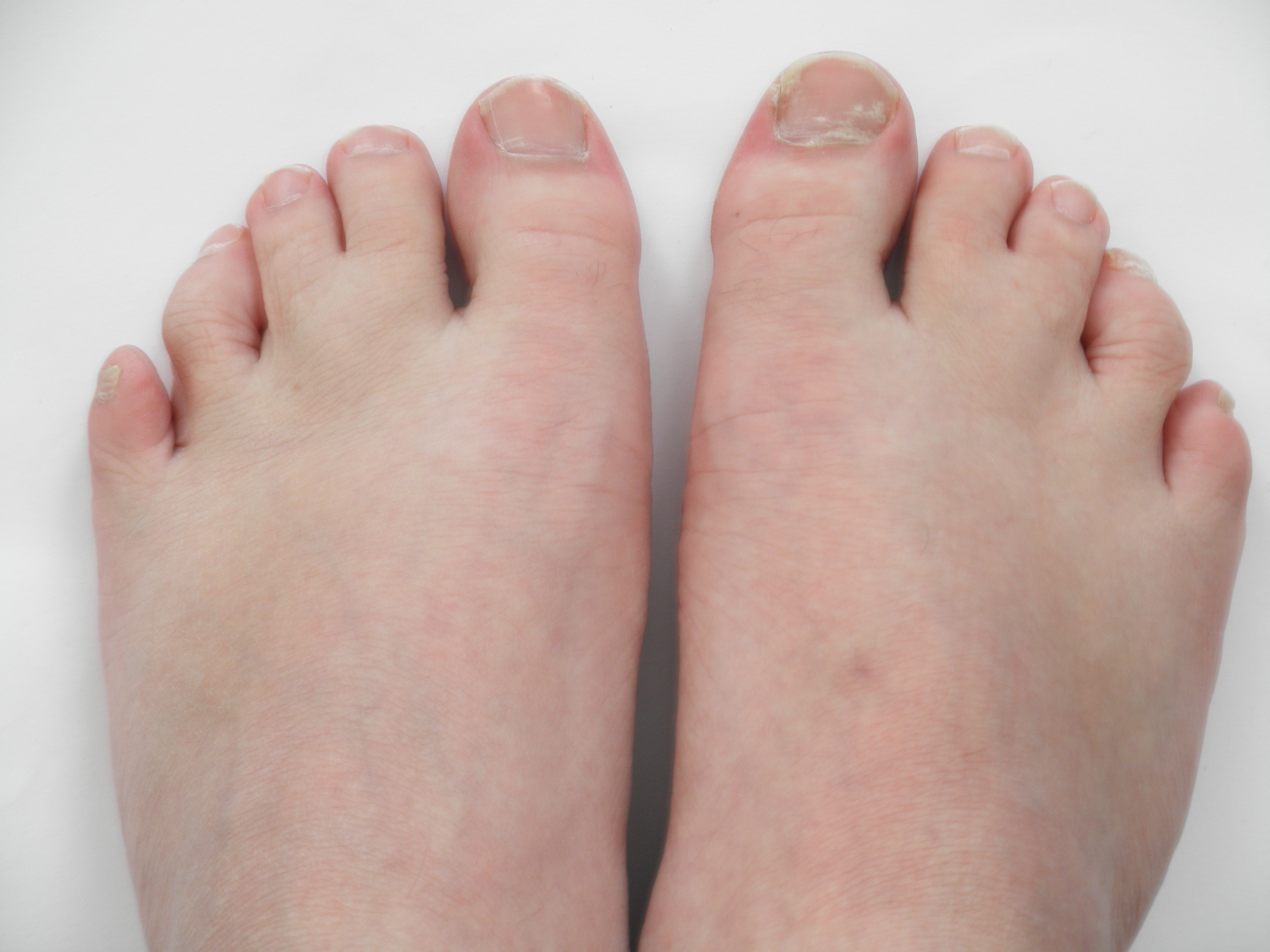
Feet with partial syndactyly of the second and third toes

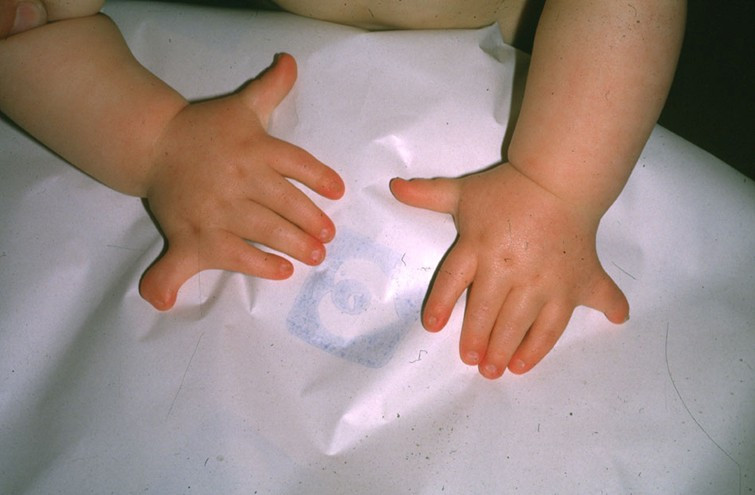
Bilateral polydactyly with short fingers in Ellis–Van Creveld syndrome patient

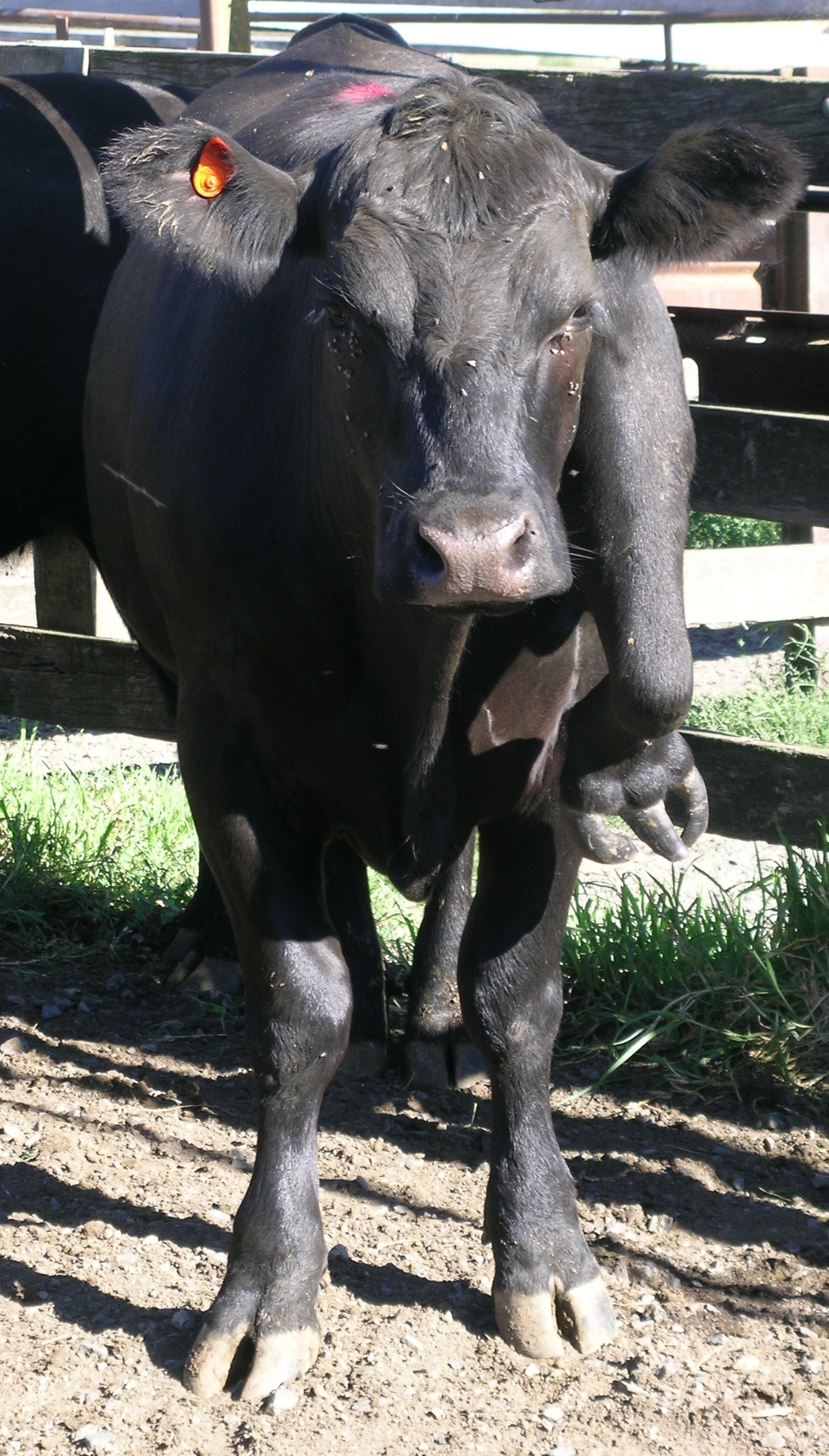
A steer with polymelia, resulting in a fifth leg

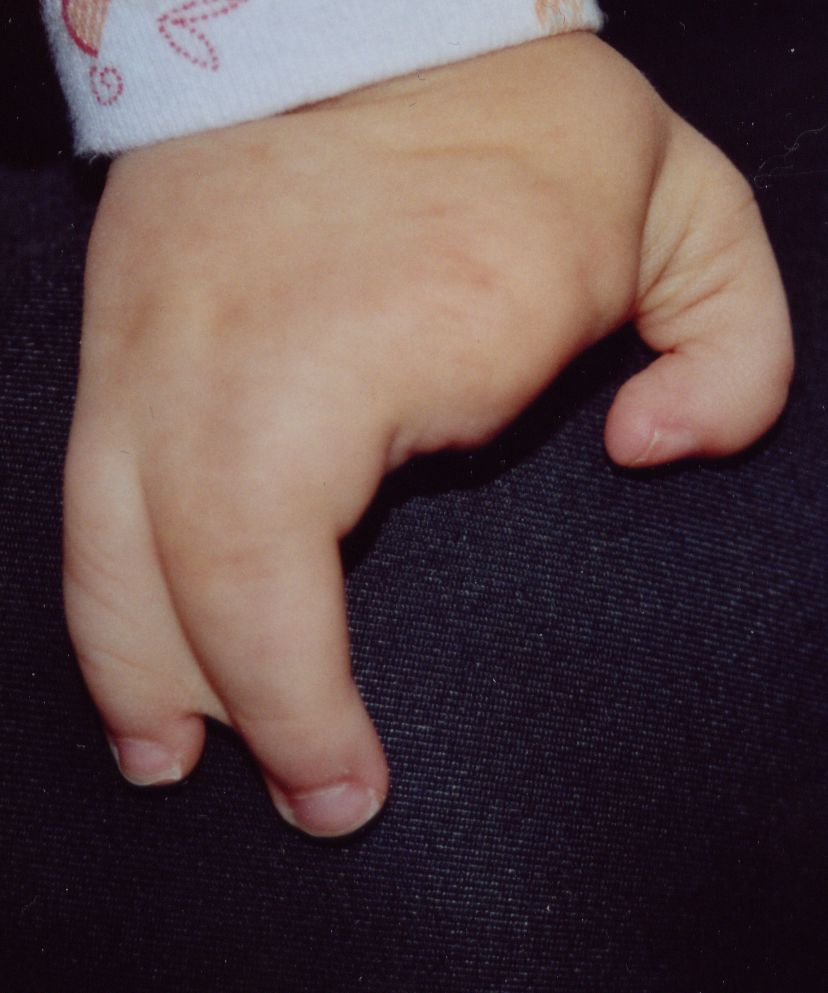
Ectrodactyly and syndactyly on a one-year-old's hand

Dysmelia encompasses a variety of conditions, including all of the above

Congenital limb deformities or dysmelia (from Ancient Greek δυσ- (dys) 'bad' and μέλος (mélos) 'limb') is a congenital disorder of a limb resulting from a disturbance in embryonic development. These congenital musculoskeletal disorders which primarily affect the upper and lower limbs.

An example is polydactyly, where a foot or hand has more than 5 digits. Clubfoot, one of the most common congenital deformities of the lower limbs, occurs approximately 1 in 1000 births. It can be treated by physical therapy, or by a combination of physical therapy and surgery.

A wide variety of abnormalities of the hands and feet, including the nails and the creases of the hand, have been described and differentiated. Many of these abnormalities do not have an impact on function but may be useful in diagnosing genetic syndromes; for example, the single transverse palmar crease is commonly associated with Down syndrome.

== Types ==
Congenital limb deformities can refer to

- missing (aplasia) limbs: amelia (including tetraamelia), oligodactyly, congenital amputation e.g. tibial or radial aplasia
- malformation of limbs: shortening (micromelia, rhizomelia or mesomelia), ectrodactyly, phocomelia, meromelia, syndactyly, brachydactyly, club foot
- extra limbs: polymelia, polydactyly, polysyndactyly
- others: hemimelia, symbrachydactyly

== Occurrence rate ==
Birth defects involving limbs occur in 0.69 per 1000. One class of congenital limb deformities, limb reduction defects, occurs when one or more limbs are undersized or missing parts. The prevalence of these defects in the United States is approximately 1 in 1900 births.

This category includes amelia, ectrodactyly, radial dysplasia, and phocomelia among others. These defects are more likely to be unilateral than bilateral, more likely to affect the upper limbs than lower limbs, and are associated with complex genetic syndromes about 10% of the time.

== Causes ==
Congenital limb deformities can be caused by

- Inheritance of abnormal genes, e.g. polydactyly, ectrodactyly or brachydactyly, symptoms of deformed limbs then often occur in combination with other symptoms (syndromes)
- external causes during pregnancy (thus not inherited), e.g. via amniotic band syndrome
- teratogenic drugs (e.g. thalidomide, which causes phocomelia) or environmental chemicals
- ionizing radiation (nuclear weapons, radioiodine, radiation therapy)
- infections
- metabolic imbalance

== Syndromes ==
- 2p15-16.1 microdeletion syndrome
- Achard syndrome
- Ackerman syndrome
- Acrocallosal syndrome
- Acropectoral syndrome
- Adams–Oliver syndrome
- Aglossia adactylia
- Amniotic band syndrome
- Apert syndrome
- Autosomal recessive Robinow syndrome
- Basel–Vanagaite–Sirota syndrome (Microlissencephaly-Micromelia syndrome)
- Campomelic dysplasia
- Cardiofaciocutaneous syndrome
- Catel–Manzke syndrome
- Cenani–Lenz syndrome
- Corneodermatoosseous syndrome
- Diploid triploid mosaic
- Ectrodactyly–ectodermal dysplasia–cleft syndrome
- Edwards syndrome
- Ellis–Van Creveld syndrome
- Fibular dimelia diplopodia syndrome (Leg duplication mirror foot syndrome)
- Greig cephalopolysyndactyly syndrome
- Haas syndrome
- Hanhart syndrome
- Holt–Oram syndrome
- Humeroradial synostosis
- Johnson–Munson syndrome
- Joubert syndrome
- McKusick–Kaufman syndrome
- Mermaid syndrome
- Mesomelia-Synostoses syndrome (8q13 microdeletion syndrome)
- Microgastria
- Myhre syndrome
- Nager acrofacial dysostosis
- Neu–Laxova syndrome
- Patau syndrome
- Pfeiffer syndrome
- Poland syndrome
- Radial aplasia
- Roberts SC-Phocomelia syndrome (Phocomelia syndrome)
- Rubinstein–Taybi syndrome
- Silver–Russell syndrome
- Split-hand split-foot malformation (SHFM)
- TAR syndrome (thrombocytopenia with absent radius)
- Tetra-amelia syndrome
- Ulbright–Hodes syndrome
- VACTERL association
- Wallis–Zieff–Goldblatt syndrome

== See also ==
- List of children's books featuring characters with limb differences
