= Românii au talent season 2 =

Românii au talent
- Season 2
- Hosted by: Pavel Bartoș & Smiley
- Judges: Mihai Petre; Andra; Andi Moisescu
- Winner: Cristian Gog
- Runner-up: Mihai Petraiche

Release
- Original network: PRO TV
- Original release: 7 February – 11 May 2012

Season chronology
- ← Previous; Season 1 Next → Season 3

The second series of Românii au talent was broadcast on ProTV from 7 February 2012 to 11 May 2012. ProTV kept the same team, Smiley and Pavel Bartoș presenters, Andra, Mihai Petre and Andi Moisescu jurors. The season started with a bigger audience than the first. The first episode from auditions had a 21.8 rating, compared to 18 points for the similar episode of the first season.

The show was won by mentalist Cristian Gog, with robot-dancer Mihai Petraiche second and speed-cubbing Cristian Leana on the third place.

== Auditions ==
The auditions were extended to six cities. Constanţa, Timișoara, Bucharest and Cluj-Napoca were kept, and Iaşi and Craiova were added. The auditions took place between August and September 2011.

The first episode was broadcast on 17 February, and it was again a big hit for ProTV. They decided to air seven audition episodes, instead of six, for the first season. Also, the number of contestants qualified for the semifinals was extended from 48 to 60. There were five semifinals, three acts from each semifinal qualified for the final, two voted via phone or SMS, and the third voted by the jurors.

== Semi-finalists ==
Key	Winner	Runner-up	Finalist	Semi-finalist (lost judges' or public vote)

Name / Name of act	Age(s)	Genre	Act	From	Semi	Position Reached
Adrian Pintilie and Sorin	10-?	Dancing	Breakdance	Arad	2	Semi-finalist
Aflat Carol	42	Singing	Opera Singer	Hațeg	1	Semi-finalist
Alexandru Chitic	21	Acrobatic	Fire act	Brașov	4	Semi-finalist
Alexandru Munteanu	21	Singing	Guitar playing	Craiova	1	Semi-finalist
Răzvan "Krem" Alexe	22	Singing	Hip-hopper	Bucharest	2	Finalist
Aset Crew		Dancing	9-strong dance group	Brăila	1	Finalist
Avem Amentză Romale		Musicants	Music objects	Târgu-Mureș	1	Semi-finalist
BarSession		Acrobatics	Flair bartending	Brașov	3	Finalist
Bogdan Balmus	19	Acrobatic	Cycling	Piatra Neamț	3	Semi-finalist
Călușarii "Plaiurile Oltețului"	6-63	Dancing	60-traditional dance group	Osica de Jos, Olt	4	Semi-finalist
Ciprian Coldoș & SLOW	32-3	Animals	Dog act	Cluj-Napoca	4	Semi-finalist
Claudiu Toader	27	Acrobatic	Pizzar tricks	Craiova	2	Semi-finalist
Constanța Cobzariu	57	Singing	Opera singer	Tecuci	1	Semi-finalist
Cosmin Mihalache	18	Singing	Pianist	Hunedoara	5	Semi-finalist
Cristian Gog	30	Magic	Illusionism	Cluj-Napoca	3	Winner
Cristian Leana	17	Rubik	Speedcubing	Bucharest	5	Finalist
DADI+	33-47	Dancing	5-dance group	Oradea	4	Semi-finalist
Dalma Szatan	14	Dancing	Dance	Cluj-Napoca	2	Semi-finalist
Diaconu Alexandru-Neomagicianul MYDAS	25	Magic	Magician	Iași	5	Semi-finalist
Flaviu Cernescu	30	Acrobatic	Monocycle	Timișoara	5	Semi-finalist
Flaviu fără "s" and Ricky	20-13	Dancing	Hip-hop and gypsy dance	Cluj-Napoca	5	Semi-finalist
Florian Cârpaci	82	Contortionist	Contortionist	Deva	4	Semi-finalist
Florin Limbovici	35	Acrobatic	Slackline	Constanța	2	Semi-finalist
Floris Bistrița	14-24	Dancing	12-strong dance group	Bistrița	3	Semi-finalist
Gigel Frone	43	Singing	Singer	Onești	2	Finalist
Gold Mask	20-21	Dancing	4-dance group	Târgu-Mureș	2	Semi-finalist
Grupul O.Z.N. cu Masterred		Comedy	Comedians	Timișoara	1	Semi-finalist
Hypnosis		Juggling	Juggling with fire	Brașov	2	Semi-finalist
Ialcin Regep	19	Singing	Opera singer	Bucharest	4	Semi-finalist
Iulia and Bayley	26-3	Animals	Dog act	Alba Iulia	5	Semi-finalist
Iulian Tănase	32	Sculptor	Ice act	Constanța	1	Semi-finalist
Keep The Vibe Alive		Dancing	Dance ment house	Constanța	1	Semi-finalist
Larisa Bercea	21	Dancing	Pole dance	Bucharest	5	Semi-finalist
Laurențiu and Beatrice Ion	21-9	Gymnastics	Gymnastics	Bucharest	5	Semi-finalist
Lil Motion	6-17	Dancing	23-strong dance group of girls	Brăila	4	Finalist
Loredana and Cristian Fieraru	15-38	Singing	Singer and cymbal player	Hunedoara	1	Finalist
Luiza Ciudin	12	Singing	Traditional music	Gorj	5	Semi-finalist
Marian Florea	29	Singing	Singer and translator	Bucharest	4	Semi-finalist
Marius Paraschiv	22	Magic	Magician	Bucharest	4	Semi-finalist
Mihai "Bacio" Vulpe	35	Singing	Singer	Constanța	5	Semi-finalist
Mihai Petraiche	28	Dancing	Robot dance	Bucharest	5	2nd Place
Minestrone Band		Singing	Singers the vegetables	Sfântu Gheorghe	3	Semi-finalist
No Limit		Dancing	Deaf-mute 12-strong dance group	Craiova	5	Finalist
Oana Lianu	36	Singing	Pan flute player and singer	Oradea	4	Finalist
Popa Tudorel	30	Comedy	Comic	Constanța	2	Semi-finalist
Radu Ionescu	16	Singing	Guitar playing	Constanța	4	Finalist
Raoul Sipos	15	Singing	Rapper	Cluj-Napoca	3	Semi-finalist
Răzvan Rotaru	24	Comedy	Comic	Bucharest	4	Semi-finalist
Roqfellaz		Dancing	Street dance	Bucharest	3	Semi-finalist
Silviu Pașca & Friends	27-36	Singing	Pop-rock music	Timișoara	3	Semi-finalist
Ștefănescu Gabriel și Radu	11-47	Singing	Playing guitar and whistle	Craiova	2	Semi-finalist
Tatiana Fecioru	41	Gymnastics	Gymnastics	Bucharest	3	Semi-finalist
Toderică Mihai	25	Contortionist	Contortionist	Iași	1	Semi-finalist
Tomer Weissbuch	14	Singing	Pop music	Bucharest	3	Semi-finalist
Trio Magic		Magic	Magicians	Bucharest	1	Semi-finalist
Trio Zamfirescu		Singing	Guitar playing	Bucharest	3	Finalist
Vasile Godja	20	Singing	Folk violinist	Cluj-Napoca	2	Finalist
Vlad Jucan	18	Dancing	Belly dance	Turda	2	Semi-finalist
WUSHU		Martial arts	Martial arts	Bucharest	3	Semi-finalist
X-treme Brothers		Gymnastics	Balancing act	Câmpina	1	Finalist

== Semi-finals summary ==
The "Order" columns list the order of appearance each act made for every episode.

Key	Buzzed out	Judges' choice	Won the public vote	Won the judges' vote / split decision	Lost the judges' vote / public vote

=== Semi-final 1 (6 April) ===
- Guest performers: Adrian Țuțu and Narcis Iustin Ianău

Semi-Finalist	Order	Act	Judges' Vote			Results (July 13)
Semi-Finalist	Order	Act	Andi	Andra	Maihai	Results (July 13)
Keep The Vibe Alive	1	Dance ment house				Eliminated
Trio Magic	2	Magicians				Eliminated
Aflat Carol	3	Opera singer				Eliminated
Grupul O.Z.N. cu Masterred	4	Comedians				Eliminated
Iulian Tănase	5	Ice act				Eliminated
Loredana and Cristian Fieraru	6	Singer and cymbal player				2nd (Won public vote)
Toderică Mihai	7	Contortionist				Eliminated
Avem Amentză Romale	8	Music objects				Eliminated
Constanța Cobzariu	9	Opera singer				Top 4 (Lost the judges' vote)
Alexandru Munteanu	10	Guitar playing				Eliminated
X-treme Brothers	11	Balancing act				1st (Won public vote)
Aset Crew	12	9-strong dance group				Top 4 (Won the judges' vote)

=== Semi-final 2 (13 April) ===
- Guest performers: Valentin Dinu

Semi-Finalist	Order	Act	Judges' Vote			Results (July 13)
Semi-Finalist	Order	Act	Andi	Andra	Maihai	Results (July 13)
Gold Mask	1	4-dance group				Eliminated
Vasile Godja	2	Folk violinist				2nd (Won public vote)
Dalma Szatan	3	Dance				Eliminated
Ștefănescu Gabriel și Radu	4	Playing guitar and whistle				Eliminated
Florin Limbovici	5	Slackline				Eliminated
Gigel Frone	6	Sing				Top 4 (Won the judges' vote)
Adrian Pintilie and Sorin	7	Breakdance				Eliminated
Popa Tudorel	8	Comic				Top 4 (Lost the judges' vote)
Răzvan "Krem" Alexe	9	Hip-hopper				1st (Won public vote)
† Claudiu Toader	10	Pizzar tricks				Eliminated
Hypnosis	11	Juggling with fire				Eliminated
Vlad Jucan	12	Belly dance				Eliminated

=== Semi-final 3 (20 April) ===
- Guest performers: Cosmin Agache and Natalia & Aliona Duminică

Semi-Finalist	Order	Act	Judges' Vote			Results (July 13)
Semi-Finalist	Order	Act	Andi	Andra	Maihai	Results (July 13)
Floris Bistrița	1	12-strong dance group				Eliminated
Minestrone Band	2	Sing the vegetables				Eliminated
Tatiana Fecioru	3	Gymnastics				Eliminated
Raoul Sipos	4	Rapper				Eliminated
Bogdan Balmus	5	Cycling				Eliminated
Tomer Weissbuch	6	Pop music				Eliminated
WUSHU	7	Martial arts				Eliminated
Silviu Pasca & Friends	8	Pop-rock music				Eliminated
Cristian Gog	9	Mentalist				1st (Won public vote)
BarSession	10	Flair bartending				Top 4 (Won the judges' vote)
Roqfellaz	11	Street dance				Top 4 (Lost the judges' vote)
Trio Zamfirescu	12	Guitar playing				2nd (Won public vote)

=== Semi-final 4 (27 April) ===
Guest performers: Titanii Funky Fresh, Robo & Valentin Păun and Ștefan Stan

Semi-Finalist	Order	Act	Judges' Vote			Results (July 13)
Semi-Finalist	Order	Act	Andi	Andra	Maihai	Results (July 13)
Călușarii "Plaiurile Oltețului"	1	60-traditional dance group				Eliminated
† Florian Cârpaci	2	Contortionist				Eliminated
Ialcin Regep	3	Opera singer				Eliminated
Răzvan Rotaru	4	Comic dance				Eliminated
Radu Ionescu	5	Guitar playing				1st (Won public vote)
DADI+	6	5-dance group				Eliminated
Marius Paraschiv	7	Magician				Eliminated
Marian Florea	8	Sing and translate				Eliminated
Ciprian Coldoș & SLOW	9	Dog act				Top 4 (Lost the judges' vote)
Lil Motion	10	23-strong dance group of girls				Top 4 (Won the judges' vote)
Oana Lianu	11	Pan flute player and singer				2nd (Won public vote)
Alexandru Chitic	12	Fire act				Eliminated

=== Semi-final 5 (4 May) ===
- Guest performers: Ballance

Semi-Finalist	Order	Act	Judges' Vote			Results (July 13)
Semi-Finalist	Order	Act	Andi	Andra	Maihai	Results (July 13)
Iulia & Bayley	1	Dancing dog act				Eliminated
Cosmin Mihalache	2	Pianist				Top 4 (Lost the judges' vote)
Laurențiu and Beatrice Ion	3	Gymnastics				Eliminated
Flaviu fără "s" and Ricky	4	Hip-hop and gypsy dance				Eliminated
Luiza Ciudin	5	Traditional music				Eliminated
Larisa Bercea	6	Pole dance				Eliminated
Cristian Leana	7	Speedcubing				Top 4 (Won the judges' vote)
Diaconu Alexandru-Neomagicianul MYDAS	8	Magician				Eliminated
Flaviu Cernescu	9	Monocycle				Eliminated
Mihai "Bacio" Vulpe	10	Sing				Eliminated
Mihai Petraiche	11	Robot dance				2nd (Won public vote)
No Limit	12	Deaf-mute 12-strong dance group				1st (Won public vote)

=== Final (11 May) ===
- Guest performers: Andra and Razy Gogonea

Key	Winner	Runner-up

Artist	Order	Act	Finished	Result
Lil Motion	1	23-strong dance group of girls	Unknown	Eliminated
Vasile Godja	2	Folk violinist	Unknown	Eliminated
X-treme Brothers	3	Balancing act	Unknown	Eliminated
Radu Ionescu	4	Guitar playing	Unknown	Eliminated
Răzvan "Krem" Alexe	5	Hip-hopper	Unknown	Eliminated
Aset Crew	6	9-strong dance group	Unknown	Eliminated
Loredana and Cristian Fieraru	7	Singer and cymbal player	Unknown	Eliminated
BarSession	8	Flair bartending	Unknown	Eliminated
Oana Lianu	9	Pan flute player and singer	Unknown	Eliminated
Trio Zamfirescu	10	Guitar playing	Unknown	Eliminated
Cristian Gog	11	Illusionist	1	Winner
Mihai Petraiche	12	Robot dance	2	Runner-up
Gigel Frone	13	Sing	Unknown	Eliminated
No Limint	14	Deaf-mute 12-strong dance group	Unknown	Eliminated
Cristian Leana	15	Speedcubing	3	Eliminated

== Ratings ==
Episode	Date	Viewers	Share	Peak Viewers	Peak Share	Source
Auditions 1	17 February	2.3m	41%	3.05m	58.5%	
Auditions 2	24 February	2.4m	48.2%	3.04m	-	
Auditions 3	2 March	2.39m	51.5%	3.03m	64.7%	
Auditions 4	9 March	2.59m	54%	3.36m	65.3%	
Auditions 5	16 March	2.53m	55.4%	3.18m	68.4%	
Auditions 6	23 March	2.41m	50.4%	3.20m	70.7%	
Auditions 7	30 March	2.7m	48%	3.52m	69.1%	
Semi-final 1	6 April	2.1m	47.8%	2.87m	52.8%	
Semi-final 2	13 April	1.75m	38.1%	2.4m	-	
Semi-final 3	20 April	1.9m	37.5%	2.7m	-	
Semi-final 4	27 April	1.58m	33.9%	2.25m	-	
Semi-final 5	4 May	1.75m	40%	2.55m	-	
Final	11 May	1.94m	46.6%	2.86m	-	
