= Dündar =

Dündar is a Turkish masculine given name and surname. Notable people with the name include:

== Given name ==
- Dündar Ali Osman, heir of Bayezid Osman and future 45th Head of the Imperial House of Osman
- Dündar Bey (1210-1298), uncle of sultan Osman I.
- Dündar Kılıç (1935–1999), Turkish mob boss
- Dündar Siz (born 1954), French football manager
- Dündar Taşer (1925–1972), Turkish soldier
- Felek al-Din Dündar (died 1324 or 1326), Beg of Hamid

== Surname ==
- Can Dündar (born 1961), Turkish journalist
- Fuat Dündar (born 1971), Turkish academic
- Hüseyin Dündar (born 1986), Turkish martial artist
- Munis Dundar (born 1961), Turkish professor
- Özlem Özgül Dündar (born 1983), German poet
- Uğur Dündar (born 1943), Turkish journalist
- Ümit Dündar (born 1955), Turkish general
