= Românii au talent season 4 =

Românii au talent
- Season 4
- Hosted by: Pavel Bartoș & Smiley
- Judges: Mihai Petre; Andra; Andi Moisescu
- Winner: Brio Sonores
- Runner-up: Leon Magdan

Release
- Original network: PRO TV
- Original release: 14 February – 16 May 2014

Season chronology
- ← Previous; Season 3

The fourth season of Românii au talent aired on ProTV from 14 February 2014 to 16 May 2014. ProTV announced that all of the cast from the last season would return, that being Smiley and Pavel Bartoș as presenters of the show, and Andra, Mihai Petre and Andi Moisescu making up the judging panel.

Judges & Presenters for Românii au talent (season 4)

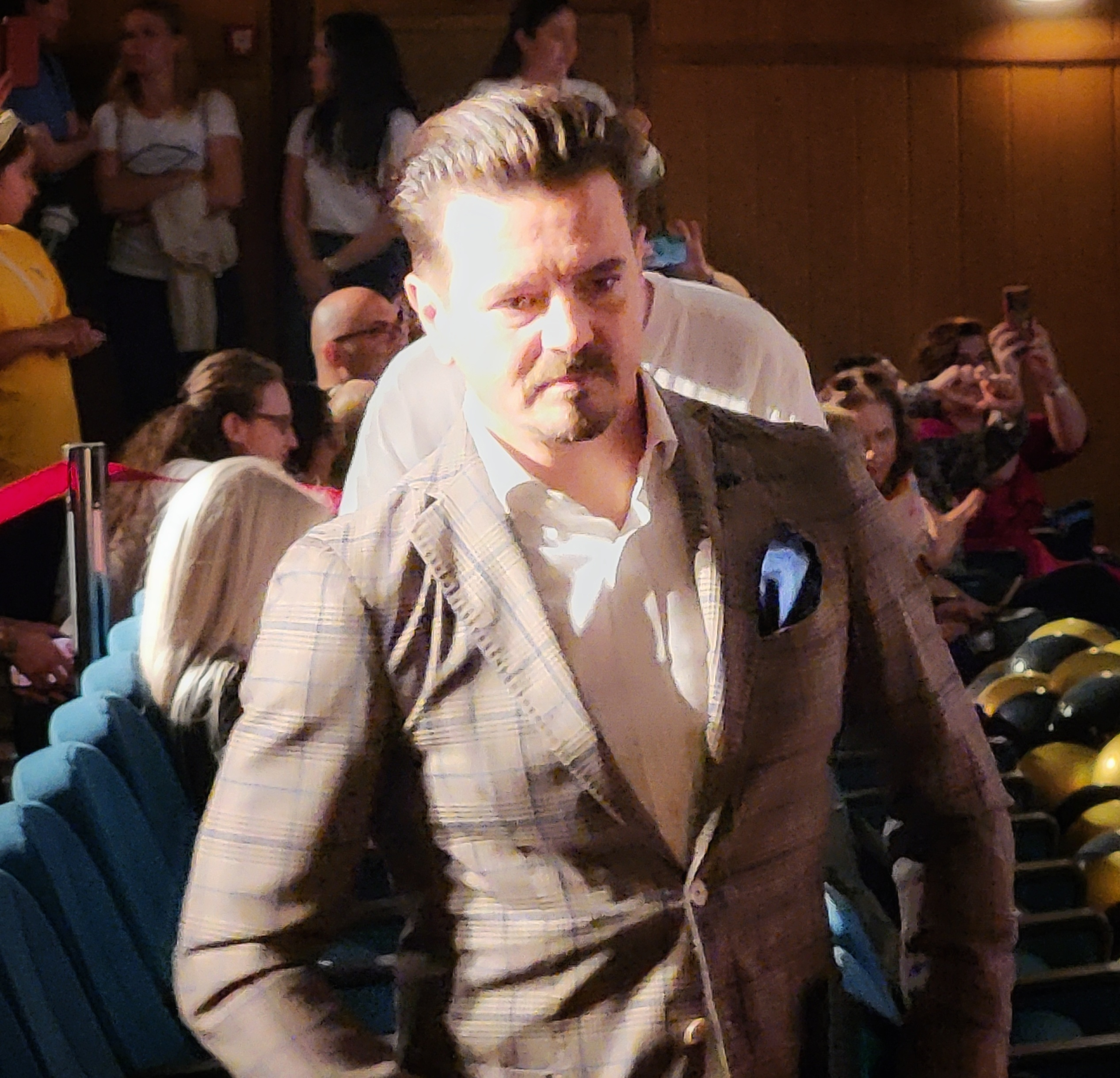
Mihai Petre

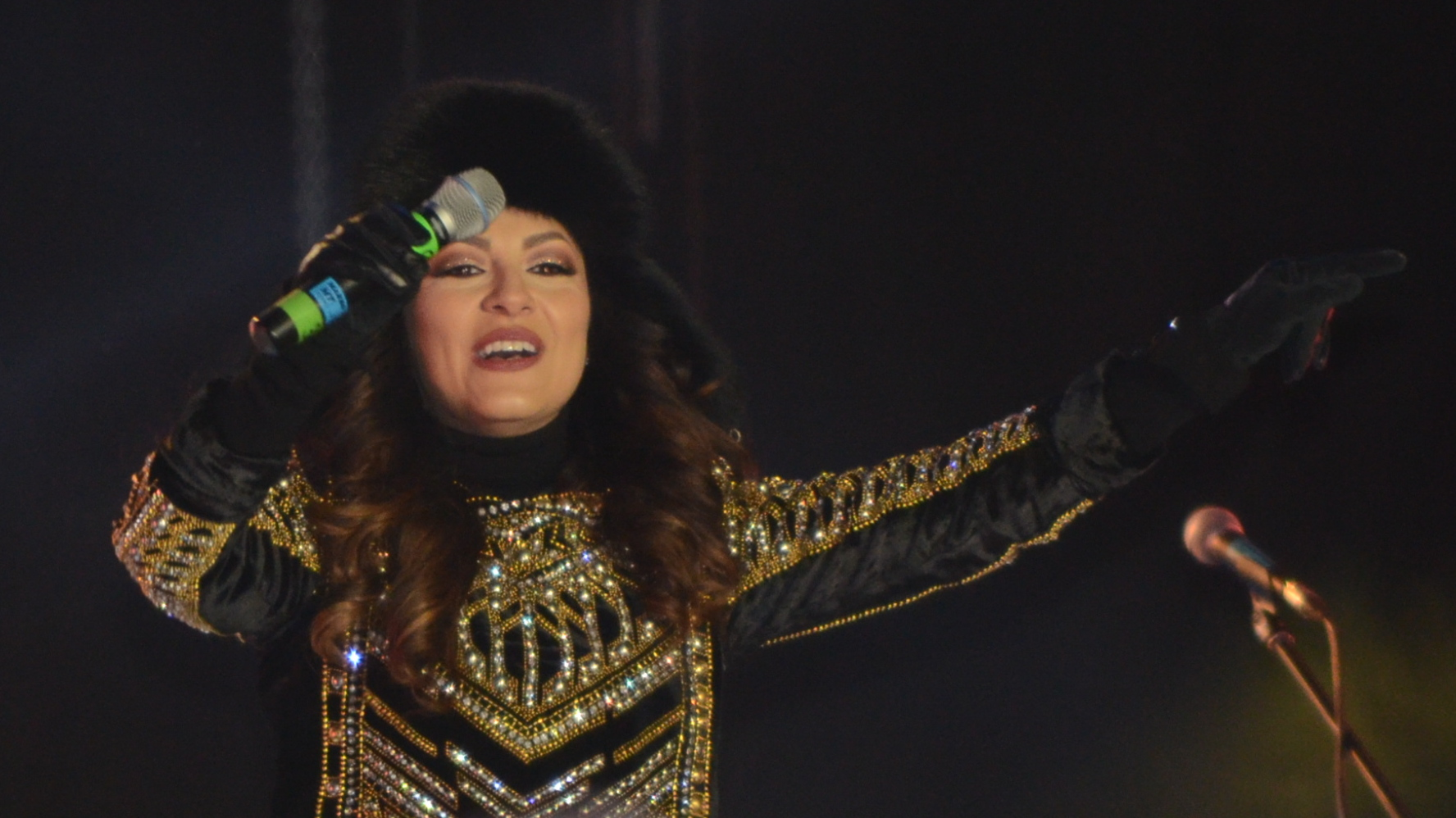
Andra

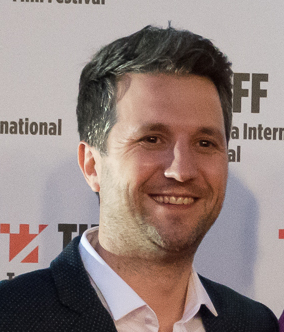
Andi Moisescu

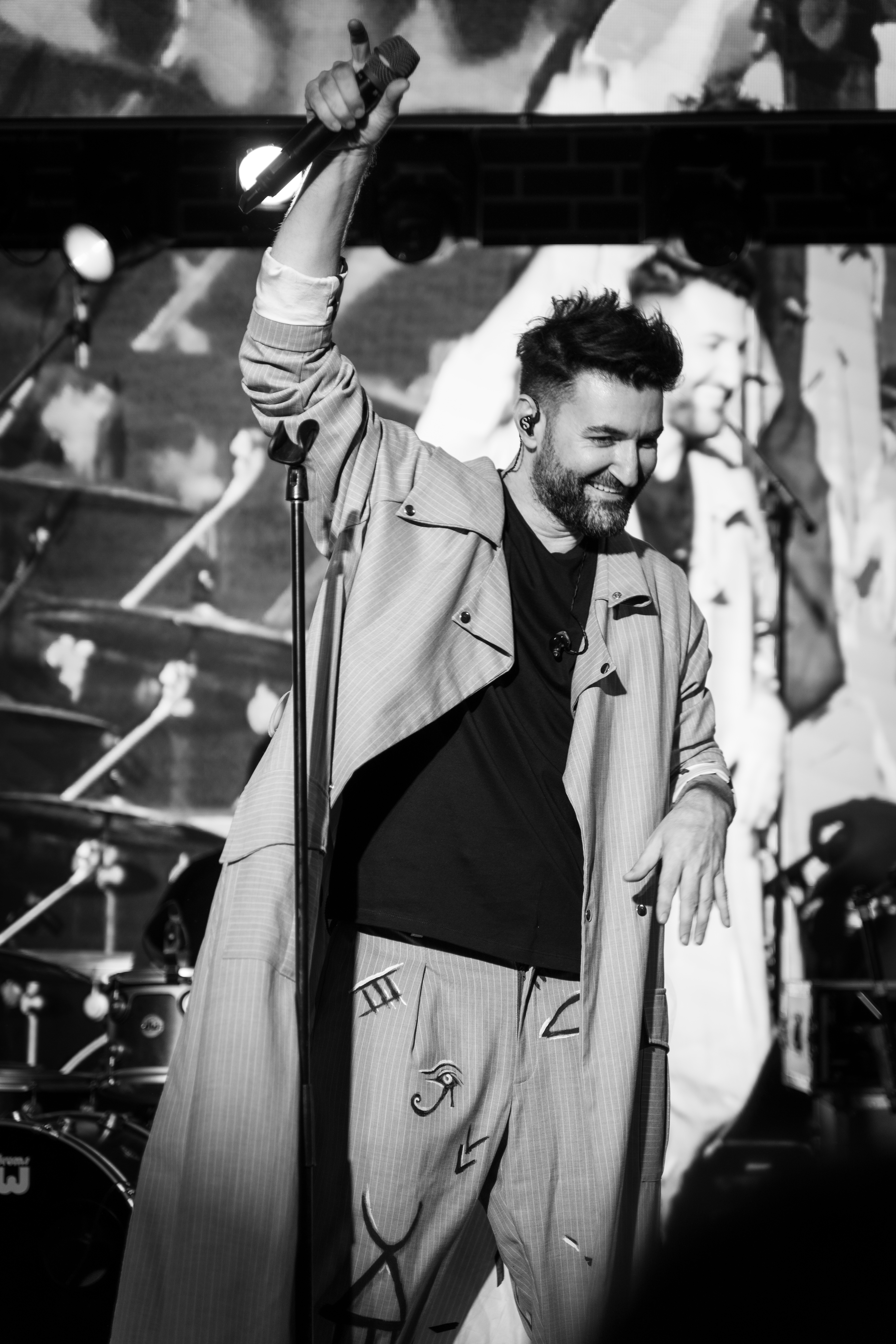
Smiley

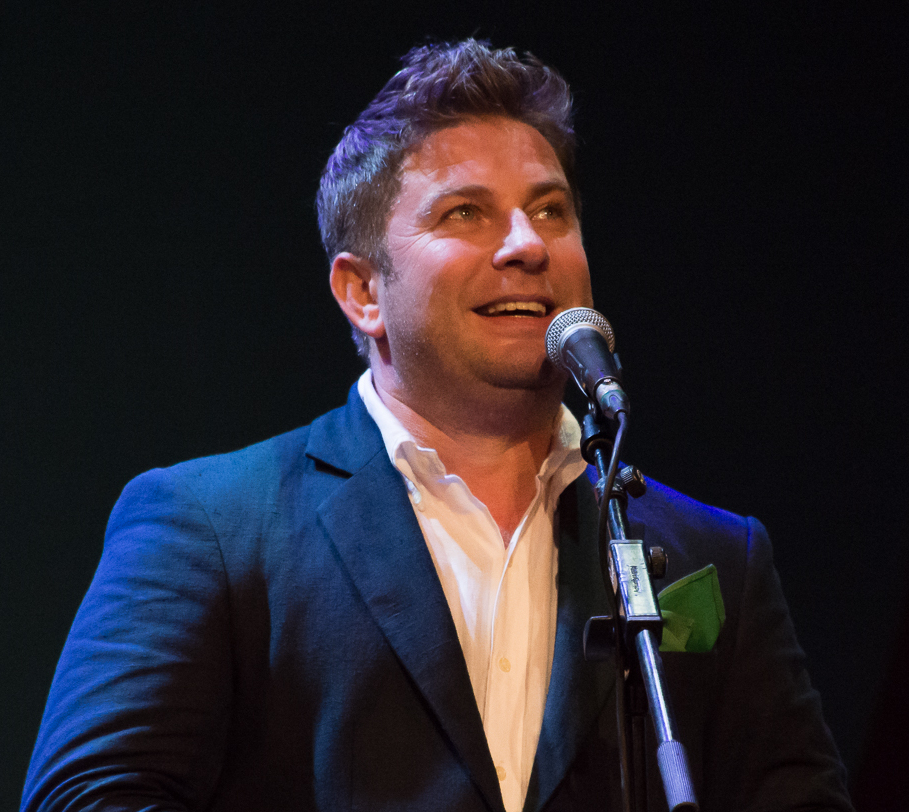
Pavel Bartoș

== Format ==
The auditions take place in front of the judges and a live audience at different cities across Romania and Moldova. Unlike X Factor, at any time during the audition, the judges may show disapproval to the act by pressing a buzzer which lights a large red "X" on the stage, indicating that they particularly dislike the act and do not wish the performance to continue. If all the judges press their buzzers, the act must end immediately.

After the auditions, the judges have to whittle almost 200 successful acts down to just 60. All of the performers are called back to discover if they have progressed to the live semi-finals.

== Semi-finals ==
Buzzed out | Judges' vote | Advanced - 1st in Public Vote | Advanced - 2nd in Public Vote
Advanced - Judges' Vote | Eliminated - Judges' Vote | Eliminated

=== Semi-final 1 (11 April) ===
Semi-Finalist	Order	Buzzes and Judges' Vote			Result
Semi-Finalist	Order	Mihai	Andra	Andi	Result
Ansamblul Crișul	1				Eliminated
Alla Moisei	2				Eliminated
Adina Gherasim	3				Eliminated
RWB	4				Eliminated
Rodion Sukman	5				Eliminated
Lungu Paul	6				Eliminated
Bugnar Ioan	7				Eliminated
Ansamblul Cervona Kalena	8				Eliminated
Andrei Cerbu	9				Advanced (Won Public Vote)
Ricardo Massida	10				Eliminated (Lost Judges' Vote)
Trupa Workout	11				Advanced (Won Judges' Vote)
Los Hermanos Dinamitas	12				Advanced (Won Public Vote)

=== Semi-final 2 (18 April) ===
Semi-Finalist	Order	Buzzes and Judges' Vote			Result
Semi-Finalist	Order	Mihai	Andra	Andi	Result
Fanfara Chetriș	1				Eliminated
Svetlana & Ivan Rotari	2				Eliminated
Jean Pierre Obiang	3				Eliminated
Super Chill	4				Eliminated
3D Sky	5				Eliminated
Hungry Tigers	6				Eliminated
Surorile Timofte	7				Eliminated
Ștefan Popescu	8				Advanced (Won Public Vote)
Space	9				Eliminated (Lost Judges' Vote)
Raul Gheba	10				Advanced (Won Judges' Vote)
Duo Criss	11				Eliminated
Cătălin Mihalache	12				Advanced (Won Public Vote)

=== Semi-final 3 (25 April) ===
Semi-Finalist	Order	Buzzes and Judges' Vote			Result
Semi-Finalist	Order	Mihai	Andra	Andi	Result
Ansamblul Veselia	1				Eliminated
Trupa Qui Peut	2				Eliminated
Ionuț Stângă	3				Eliminated
Trial Bike	4				Eliminated
Andreas Bu	5				Eliminated
Akikai Junior	6				Eliminated
Cvintetul Anatoly	7				Advanced (Won Public Vote)
Raisa Anischevici	8				Eliminated (Lost Judges' Vote)
Claudia Stroe	9				Advanced (Won Judges' Vote)
Duo Armonia	10				Eliminated
Leon Magdan	11				Advanced (Won Public Vote)
Samir și Max	12				Eliminated

=== Semi-final 4 (2 May) ===
Semi-Finalist	Order	Buzzes and Judges' Vote			Result
Semi-Finalist	Order	Mihai	Andra	Andi	Result
Brothers Crew	1				Eliminated
Florinel Lăutaru	2				Eliminated
Musical Art	3				Eliminated
Trupa Angels	4				Eliminated
Alin Beca & Cătălina Țampău	5				Advanced (Won Judges' Vote)
Ovidiu Păsărar	6				Eliminated (Lost Judges' Vote)
Emy Drăgoi	7				Advanced (1st in Public Vote)
Vlad Bătrînu	8				Eliminated
Irina & George Ciucălău	9				Eliminated
Laura Bișog	10				Eliminated
Octavian Stoica	11				Advanced (2nd in Public Vote)
Blonde Tails	12				Eliminated

=== Semi-final 5 (9 May) ===
Semi-Finalist	Order	Buzzes and Judges' Vote			Result
Semi-Finalist	Order	Mihai	Andra	Andi	Result
Black & White	1				Eliminated
Biba Struja	2				Eliminated
Sabin Cojocaru	3				Advanced (2nd in Public Vote)
Slackline Tg. Ocna	4				Eliminated
Real Action Crew	5				Eliminated
Theodor Rusu	6				Eliminated
Foureast Emsiz	7				Eliminated
Alexandra Siverenco	8				Advanced (Won Judges' Vote)
Cezar Bălășoiu	9				Eliminated (Lost Judges' Vote)
Duo Apostol	10				Eliminated
Romina & Alina Cuțaev	11				Eliminated
Brio Sonores	12				Advanced (1st in Public Vote)

== Final (16 May) ==
Key	Winner	Runner-up

Artist	Order	Act	Finished	Result
Los Hermanos Dinamitas	1			
Alexandra Siverenco	2			
Raul Gheba	3			
Emy Drăgoi	4			
Cătălin Mihalache	5			Originality prize
Octavian Stoica	6			
Cvintetul Anatoly	7			
Leon Magdan	8			2
Alin Beca & Cătălina Țampău	9			
Claudia Stroe	10			
Sabin Cojocaru	11			
Andrei Cerbu	12			3
Ștefan Popescu alias Fane Mississippi Delta Blues	13			
Brio Sonores	14			1
Trupa Workout	15			
