= Românii au talent season 1 =

Românii au talent
- Season 1
- Hosted by: Pavel Bartoș & Smiley
- Judges: Mihai Petre; Andra; Andi Moisescu
- Winner: Adrian Țuțu
- Runner-up: Narcis Iustin Ianău

Release
- Original network: PRO TV
- Original release: 18 February – 25 April 2011

Season chronology
- Next → Season 2

The first season of Românii au talent began on 18 February 2011 and ended on 25 April 2011. It was won by rapper Adrian Țuțu. The show was divided in 11 parts, the first six broadcast the auditions, the following four represented the semifinals, and the last part was the big final. The semifinals and the final were broadcast live, in a studio, with audience. The show recorded the biggest Romanian audiences for a reality competition.

== Beginnings ==
The first commercials for the show were first aired in the Summer of 2010. The application process started on July 2, 2010. The judges firstly visited Constanţa, Piatra Neamț, Timișoara, Bucharest and Cluj-Napoca. The show first aired on 18 February 2011.

== Success ==
The first episode was a big success for the ratings. Pro TV not only managed to have the biggest audience during the show, but managed to make "Romania's Got Talent" the most viewed television show since 2004 in Romania, beating its own records for the show Dansez pentru tine (Dancing with the Stars), another popular show in Romania broadcast by Pro TV.

== Semi-finalists ==
Out of hundreds of contestants, only 200 won the local selection, having 1 or no X-es. The jury decided only 48 finalists. According to Pro TV's website, each contestant that qualified for the semifinals, were voted by the general public through text messages.

The semi-finals were broadcast in four editions: On April 1, April 2 respectively April 8 and April 9, 2011. In each edition, twelve contestants had to pass the juries and get as many votes from the general public in order to proceed further to the finals, the last step to the grand prize.

Key	Winner	Runner-up	Finalist	Semi-finalist (lost judges' or public vote)

Name / Name of act	Age(s)	Genre	Act	From	Semi	Position Reached
AcroMistyc		Dancing	Dance and acrobatics	Bucharest	3	Semi-finalist
Adrian Țuțu	18	Singing	Rapper	Focșani	2	Winner
Akikai	7-19	Martial arts	Martial arts	Tecuci	2	Finalist
Alin Imre	7	Dancing	Dance	Bucharest	2	Semi-finalist
Alin Stanis	38	Singing	Opera singer	Cluj-Napoca	4	Semi-finalist
Alma Boiangiu	19	Singing	Pianist and singer	Bucharest	3	Semi-finalist
Ana-Maria Sandu	17	Singing	Playing the saxophone	Piatra Neamț	1	Semi-finalist
Ballance	26-26	Gymnastics	Balancing act	Brașov	1	Finalist
Bernadette Szep and dog Vanda	19-?	Animals	Dancing dog act	Miercurea Ciuc	1	Semi-finalist
Blockbusters Crew	7-20	Dancing	Dance	Bucharest	4	Semi-finalist
Claudiu Urdea	37	Singing	Sing	Onești	2	Semi-finalist
Clevers	15-20	Dancing	14-strong dance group of girls	Bihor	3	Semi-finalist
Cosmin Agache	14	Beat boxing	Beatbox	Botoșani	3	Finalist
Cristina Bondoc & Alina Dincă	20-22	Singing	Sing	Tulcea/Bucharest	2	Finalist
Dance Fiction Crew (DFC)	18-27	Dancing	Street dance	Lugoj	3	Semi-finalist
Daniel Borșan	47	Dancing	Dance	Turda	3	Semi-finalist
Eduard Malița and Bianca Oniță	19-20	Magic	Magicians	Oradea	2	Semi-finalist
Fanfara Rotaria Junior	6-16	Musicants	Music instruments	Vaslui	4	Semi-finalist
Florin Harsan	33	Barber	Barber	Bucharest	1	Semi-finalist
Freakquency	21-24	Dancing	Breakdance	Bucharest	4	Semi-finalist
Ioana Rotar	13	Contortionist	Contortionist	Oradea	3	Semi-finalist
Laura Bogorodea	20	Dancing	Indian dance	Constanța	2	Semi-finalist
Lorenzo Cristian	29	Magic	Magicians	Timișoara	3	Semi-finalist
Marian Vasilescu	19	Singing	Sing	Drobeta Turnu Severin	3	Semi-finalist
Marius Coșofreț	20	Comedy	Comic	Vînători	2	Semi-finalist
Marius Ioniță	42	Singing	Playing the drums and step dancing	Cluj-Napoca	1	Semi-finalist
Mădălina Luca	18	Singing	Pan flute player	Roman	4	Semi-finalist
Medea Felea	23	Dancing	Pole dance	Milan	4	Finalist
Mihail Cămărăscu	63	Singing	Opera singer	Bucharest	1	Semi-finalist
Narcis Iustin Ianău	17	Singing	Opera singer	Bacău	1	2nd Place
Natalia and Aliona Duminică	20-44	Dancing	Belly dance	Chişinău (originally from Moldova)	4	Semi-finalist
Orlando Oprescu	24	Acrobatics	Acrobatics	Bucharest	4	Semi-final
Paul and Virgil Păunescu	32-32	Singing	Sing	Bucharest	1	Semi-final
Rareș Deac	19	Contortionist	Contortionist	Mediaș	1	Semi-Finalist
Rebeca Neacșu	7	Singing	Opera singer	Brașov	3	Finalist
Reka Lazin and Ștefan Manduc	19-22	Dancing	Dance	Cluj-Napoca	1	Semi-finalist
Ștefan Florescu	19	Juggling	Juggle the ball	Botoșani	3	Finalist
Tatiana Ilescu	21	Acrobatic	Monocycle	Chişinău (originally from Moldova)	2	Semi-finalist
Titanii Funky Fresh	22-27	Dancing	4-dance group	Bucharest	1	Semi-finalist
Transylvania Voces	15-22	Singing	Singers the bottle, the sticks and gospel music	Cluj-Napoca	4	Semi-finalist
Trouble	17-25	Dance	11-strong dance group	Bucharest	2	Semi-finalist
Trupa Mistik		Magic	Magicians	Bucharest	4	Semi-finalist
Valentin Dinu	22	Sing	Singing	Ploiești	4	Finalist
Valentin Luca	25	Acrobatics	Flair bartending	Brașov	4	Finalist
Valentin Păun	23	Dancing	Dance and comedy	Bucharest	2	Semi-finalist
Veronica Fizeșan		Singing	Opera and rock sing	Cluj-Napoca	4	Semi-finalist
Veverițele vesele	20-33	Comedy	Comedians	Cluj-Napoca	2	Semi-finalist
Viorica and Emil Luca	51-56	Dancing	Traditional dance (pirouettes)	Agricultori	1	Finalist

== Semi-finals summary ==
The "Order" columns list the order of appearance each act made for every episode.

Key	Buzzed out	Judges' choice	Won the public vote	Won the judges' vote / split decision	Lost the judges' vote / public vote

=== Semi-final 1 (1 April) ===
- Guest performers: Costel Busuioc and Valentin Urse.

Semi-Finalist	Order	Act	Judges' Vote			Results (July 13)
Semi-Finalist	Order	Act	Andi	Andra	Maihai	Results (July 13)
Titanii Funky Fresh	1	4-dance group				Eliminated
Narcis Iustin Ianău	2	Opera singer				1st (Won public vote)
Ana-Maria Sandu	3	Playing the saxophone				Eliminated
Marius Ioniță	4	Playing the drums and step dancing				Eliminated
Viorica and Emil Luca	5	Traditional dance (pirouettes)				Top 4 (Won the judges' vote)
Paul and Virgil Păunescu	6	Sing				Eliminated
Bernadette Szep and dog Vanda	7	Dancing dog act				Top 4 (Lost the judges' vote)
Reka Lazin and Ștefan Manduc	8	Dance				Eliminated
Mihail Cămărăscu	9	Opera singer				Eliminated
Florin Hasan	10	Barber				Eliminated
Rareș Deac	11	Contortionist				Eliminated
Ballance	12	Balancing act				2nd (Won public vote)

=== Semi-final 2 (2 April) ===
- Guest performers: Pepe and Petruța Cecilia Kupper.

Semi-Finalist	Order	Act	Judges' Vote			Results (July 13)
Semi-Finalist	Order	Act	Andi	Andra	Maihai	Results (July 13)
Adrian Țuțu	1	Rapper				1st (Won public vote)
Eduard Malița și Bianca Oniță	2	Magicians				Eliminated
Claudiu Udrea	3	Sing				Eliminated
Veverițele vesele	4	Comedinas				Eliminated
Valentin Păun	5	Dance and comedy				Eliminated
Cristina Bondoc & Alina Dincă	6	Sing				2nd (Won public vote)
Alin Imre	7	Dance				Top 4 (Lost judges' vote)
Tatiana Ilescu	8	Monocycle				Eliminated
Trouble	9	11-strong dance group				Eliminated
Marius Coșofreț	10	Comic				Eliminated
Laura Bogorodea	11	Indian dance				Eliminated
Akikai	12	Martial arts				Top 4 (Won judges' vote)

=== Semi-final 3 (8 April) ===
- Guest performers: The 8 teams competing in Dansez pentru tine.

Semi-Finalist	Order	Act	Judges' Vote			Results (July 13)
Semi-Finalist	Order	Act	Andi	Andra	Maihai	Results (July 13)
Clevers	1	14-strong dance group of girls				Eliminated
AcroMistyc	2	Dance and acrobatics				Eliminated
Marian Vasilescu	3	Sing				Eliminated
Rebeca Neacșu	4	Opera singer				Top 4 (Won judges' vote)
Daniel Borșan	5	Dance				Eliminated
Alma Boiangiu	6	Pianist and singer				Eliminated
Lorenzo Cristian	7	Magician				Eliminated
Ioana Rotar	8	Contortionist				Eliminated
Transylvania Voces	9	Singers the bottle, the sticks and gospel music				Eliminated
Cosmin Agache	10	Beatbox				2nd (Won public vote)
Dance Fiction Crew (DFC)	11	Street dance				Top 4 (Lost judges' vote)
Ștefan Florescu	12	Juggle the ball				1st (Won public vote)

=== Semi-final 4 (9 April) ===
- Guest performer: Horia Brenciu and Marius Mihalache.

Semi-Finalist	Order	Act	Judges' Vote			Results (July 13)
Semi-Finalist	Order	Act	Andi	Andra	Maihai	Results (July 13)
Blockbusters Crew	1	9-dance group				Eliminated
Valentin Dinu	2	Sing				1st (Won public vote)
Fanfara Rotaria Junior	3	Music instruments				Eliminated
Natalia și Aliona Duminică	4	Belly dance				Eliminated
Alin Stanis	5	Opera singer				Top 4 (Lost judges' vote)
Orlando Oprescu	6	Acrobatics				Eliminated
Mădălina Luca	7	Pan flute player				Eliminated
Trupa Mistik	8	Magicians				Eliminated
Veronica Fizeșan	9	Opera and rock sing				Eliminated
Freakquency	10	Breakdance				Eliminated
Medea Felea	11	Pole dance				Top 4 (Won the judges' vote)
Valentin Luca	12	Flair bartending				2nd (Won public vote)

=== Final (25 April) ===
- Guest performer: Loredana Groza and Damian Drăghici.

Key	Winner	Runner-up

Artist	Order	Act	Finished	Result
Rebeca Neacșu	1	Opera singer	7th - 2,50%	Eliminated
Akikai	2	Martial arts	12th - 0,79%	Eliminated
Valentin Dinu	3	Sing	3rd - 16,26%	Third place
Viorica and Emil Luca	4	Traditional dance (pirouettes)	11th - 0,86%	Eliminated
Ștefan Florescu	5	Juggle the ball	8th - 1,94%	Eliminated
Medea Felea	6	Pole dance	10th - 1,02%	Eliminated
Cristina Bondoc & Alina Dincă	7	Sing	9th - 1,11%	Eliminated
Valentin Luca	8	Flair bartending	6th - 3,53%	Eliminated
Cosmin Agache	9	Beatbox	5th - 7,91%	Eliminated
Narcis Iustin Ianău	10	Opera singer	2nd - 24,40%	Runner-up
Ballance	11	Balancing act	4th - 10,40%	Eliminated
Adrian Țuțu	12	Rapper	1st - 29,29%	Winner

== Ratings ==
Episode	Date	Viewers	Share	Peak Viewers	Peak Share	Source
Auditions 1	18 February	2.05m	35.6%	2.7m	—	
Auditions 2	25 February	2.24m	39.8%	4.5m	59.8%	
Auditions 3	4 March	2.4m	42.8%	3.08m	—	
Auditions 4	11 March	2.55m	44.3%	3.28m	—	
Auditions 5	18 March	2.52m	58.1%	5m	70.6%	
Auditions 6	25 March	2.55m	46.7%	5.5m	70.7%	
Semi-final 1	1 April	2.3m	47.3%	5.5m	66.6%	
Semi-final 2	2 April	2m	48.2%	—	—	
Semi-final 3	8 April	2.18m	45.7%	5m	64.8%	
Semi-final 4	9 April	2.01m	40.3%	—	59.9%	
Final	25 April	2.11m	43.4%	2.82m	50%	
