= Robert Tudor =

Robert Tudor may refer to:

- Robert Tudor (magician), Romanian magician, entertainer, and television presenter
- Robert Lee Tudor, American politician from New York
- Rob Tudor, Canadian ice hockey player
