= Românii au talent season 3 =

Românii au talent
- Season 3
- Hosted by: Pavel Bartoș & Smiley
- Judges: Mihai Petre; Andra; Andi Moisescu
- Winner: Bruno Icobeţ
- Runner-up: Vlad Grigorescu

Release
- Original network: PRO TV
- Original release: 15 February – 10 May 2013

Season chronology
- ← Previous; Season 2 Next → Season 4

The third season of Românii au talent is aired on ProTV from 15 February 2013. ProTV kept the same team, Smiley and Pavel Bartoș presenters, Andra, Mihai Petre and Andi Moisescu jurors. The first episode brought the highest audience for a debut of a season registered so far, over five million viewers per minute.

== Semi-finalists ==
| Key | Winner | Runner-up | Finalist | Semi-finalist (lost judges' or public vote) |

=== Semi-final 1 (5 April) ===
| Semi-Finalist | Order | Act | Judges' Vote | | | Results (July 13) |
| Semi-Finalist | Order | Act | Andi | Andra | Maihai | Results (July 13) |
|---|---|---|---|---|---|---|
| Parkour Oradea | 1 | Parkour group | | | | Eliminated |
| Zoltan Martonoş | 2 | Painter | | | | Eliminated |
| Trupa UST Freestylers | 3 | Dance group | | | | Eliminated |
| Crina Zvobodă | 4 | Ventriloquist | | | | Eliminated |
| Trupa Maria | 5 | Musical group | | | | Eliminated |
| Ştefan Orheanu | 6 | Irish dance | | | | Top 4 (Lost the judges' vote) |
| Ghenadie Rotari | 7 | Accordionist | | | | Top 4 (Won the judges' vote) |
| Gabi Vişoiu | 8 | Trick shot | | | | Eliminated |
| Mihai Dobriceanu | 9 | Robot dance | | | | Eliminated |
| Vlad Grigorescu | 10 | Mentalist | | | | 2nd (Won public vote) |
| Roland Kiss | 11 | Cyclist | | | | Eliminated |
| Gabriela Artene | 12 | Opera singer | | | | 1st (Won public vote) |

=== Semi-final 2 (12 April) ===
| Semi-Finalist | Order | Act | Judges' Vote | | | Results (July 13) |
| Semi-Finalist | Order | Act | Andi | Andra | Maihai | Results (July 13) |
|---|---|---|---|---|---|---|
| Amadance | 1 | Violin / Musical group | | | | Eliminated |
| Diana Căldăraru | 2 | Singer | | | | 2nd (Won public vote) |
| George Gache | 3 | Magician | | | | Eliminated |
| Ionela Ţăruş & Mihai Ungureanu | 4 | Ballroom dancers | | | | Top 4 (lose the judges' vote) |
| Laura Cupşa | 5 | Rhythmic gymnast | | | | Eliminated |
| Andreea & Francesca Ilie | 6 | Singers | | | | Eliminated |
| Andrei Pavel | 7 | Powder painting artist | | | | Eliminated |
| Trupa XTREME | 8 | Acrobatics group | | | | Eliminated |
| Ervin Herskovics | 9 | Beatboxer | | | | Eliminated |
| Nic Mihale | 10 | Magician | | | | Eliminated |
| WhoGonStopUs | 11 | Dance group | | | | Top 4 (Won the judges' vote) |
| Corul Fiat Lux | 12 | Choir | | | | 1st (Won public vote) |

=== Semi-final 3 (19 April) ===
| Semi-Finalist | Order | Act | Judges' Vote | | | Results (July 13) |
| Semi-Finalist | Order | Act | Andi | Andra | Maihai | Results (July 13) |
|---|---|---|---|---|---|---|
| Cornelia Tihon | 1 | Bagpiper | | | | Eliminated |
| H2O | 2 | Dance group | | | | Eliminated |
| Trupa Corina | 3 | Acrobatics group | | | | Eliminated |
| Sorin Ursan | 4 | Opera singer | | | | Top 4 (Lost the judges' vote) |
| Andrei Crăciun | 5 | Mentalist | | | | Eliminated |
| Simply That Crew | 6 | Dance group | | | | Eliminated |
| Călin Marincaş | 7 | Voice imitator | | | | Eliminated |
| Andra Păcurar & Alexandru Miculescu | 8 | Ballroom dancers | | | | Top 4 (Won the judges' vote) |
| Adrian Aron | 9 | Singer and guitar player | | | | Eliminated |
| Camelia Duţă | 10 | Step dancer | | | | 2nd (Won public vote) |
| Ana Munteanu | 11 | Sandpainting | | | | 1st (Won public vote) |
| Gimnis | 12 | Gymnastics group | | | | Eliminated |

=== Semi-final 4 (26 April) ===
| Semi-Finalist | Order | Act | Judges' Vote | | | Results (July 13) |
| Semi-Finalist | Order | Act | Andi | Andra | Maihai | Results (July 13) |
|---|---|---|---|---|---|---|
| Switch Crew | 1 | Dance group | | | | Eliminated |
| Angelo Simonică | 2 | Rock guitarist and singer | | | | Eliminated |
| Andrei Işfan | 3 | Magician | | | | Eliminated |
| Classic Beat Orchestra | 4 | Instrumental group | | | | Top 4 (Won the judges' vote) |
| Mihai Ştefan | 5 | Impersonator | | | | Eliminated |
| Colectivul Fantezia | 6 | Drums / Dance group | | | | Eliminated |
| Bogdan Olteanu | 7 | Powder painting artist | | | | 1st (Won public vote) |
| Orban Barra | 8 | Cyclist | | | | Eliminated |
| The Haters | 9 | Dance group | | | | Eliminated |
| Zburătorii | 10 | Parkour group | | | | Eliminated |
| Andrei Andronachi | 11 | Magician | | | | Top 4 (Lost judges`s vote) |
| Mircea Palamari | 12 | Dancer | | | | 2nd (Won public vote) |

=== Semi-final 5 (3 May) ===
| Semi-Finalist | Order | Act | Judges' Vote | | | Results (July 13) |
| Semi-Finalist | Order | Act | Andi | Andra | Maihai | Results (July 13) |
|---|---|---|---|---|---|---|
| Performers Crew | 1 | Dance group | | | | Eliminated |
| Goldenhands | 2 | Balancing act | | | | Eliminated |
| Adrian Ilinca | 3 | Robot dancer | | | | Eliminated |
| Blade Strings | 4 | Instrumental group | | | | Eliminated |
| Alexandru Marcu | 5 | Mentalist | | | | Eliminated |
| Uninvented Theatre | 6 | Dance / Theatre | | | | Top 4 (Lost the judges' vote) |
| Majoretele Râşnov | 7 | Cheerleading group | | | | Eliminated |
| Darius Bulzan | 8 | Contortionist | | | | Eliminated |
| Anca Nicoleta Căuş | 9 | Shakira impersonator and singer | | | | Eliminated |
| Bruno Icobeţ | 10 | Dog act | | | | 1st (Won public vote) |
| Eduard Andrei Sandu | 11 | Ventriloquist | | | | 2nd (Won public vote) |
| Trupa Florea | 12 | Acrobatics circus troupe | | | | Top 4 (Won the judges' vote) |

== Final (10 May) ==
| Key | Winner | Runner-up |

| Artist | Order | Act | Finished | Result |
|---|---|---|---|---|
| Corul Fiat Lux | 1 | Choir | Unknown | - |
| Ghenadie Rotari | 2 | Accordionist | Unknown | - |
| Andra Păcurar & Alexandru Miculescu | 3 | Ballroom dancers | Unknown | - |
| Diana Căldăraru | 4 | Singer | Unknown | - |
| Ana Munteanu | 5 | Sandpainting | Unknown | - |
| Camelia Duţă | 6 | Step dancer | Unknown | - |
| Gabriela Artene | 7 | Opera singer | Unknown | - |
| Classic Beat Orchestra | 8 | Instrumental group | Unknown | - |
| Mircea Palamari | 9 | Dancer | Unknown | - |
| Bogdan Olteanu | 10 | Powder painting artist | Unknown | - |
| WhoGonStopUs | 11 | Dance group | Unknown | - |
| Bruno Icobeţ | 12 | Dog act | 1 | Winner |
| Vlad Grigorescu | 13 | Mentalist | 2 | Runner-up |
| Trupa Florea | 14 | Acrobatics circus troupe | Unknown | - |
| Eduard Andrei Sandu | 15 | Ventriloquist | 3 | Third place |

== Ratings ==
| Episode | Date | Viewers (Urban) | Rating | Peak Viewers | Peak Rating | Source |
|---|---|---|---|---|---|---|
| Auditions 1 | 15 February | 2.65m | 25.1% | 5.31 m | - | |
| Auditions 2 | 22 February | | | | - | |
| Auditions 3 | 1 March | | | | - | |
| Auditions 4 | 8 March | | | | - | |
| Auditions 5 | 15 March | | | | - | |
