= Polymelia =

- Other names: Hydra syndrome
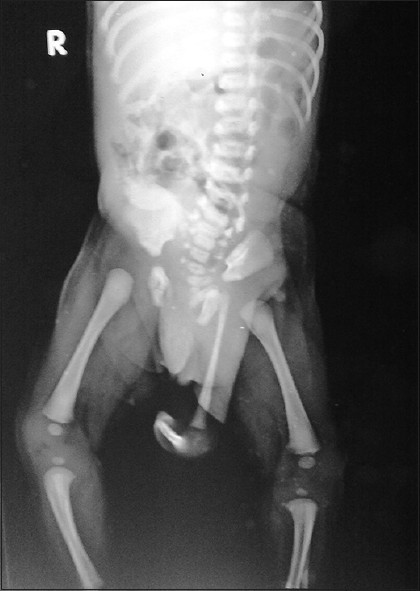
- Radiograph of a human child with polymelia
- Specialty: Medical genetics

Polymelia is a birth defect in which an affected individual has more than the usual number of limbs. It is a type of dysmelia. In humans and most land-dwelling vertebrates, this means having five or more limbs. The extra limb is most commonly shrunken or deformed. The term is from Greek πολυ- "many", μέλεα "limbs".

Sometimes an embryo started as conjoined twins, but one twin degenerated completely except for one or more limbs, which end up attached to the other twin.

Sometimes small extra legs between the normal legs are caused by the body axis forking in the dipygus condition.

Notomelia (from Greek for "back-limb-condition") is a form of polymelia where the extra limb is rooted along or near the midline of the back. Notomelia has been reported in Angus cattle often enough to be of concern to farmers.

Cephalomelia (from Greek for "head-limb-condition") is a form of polymelia where the extra limb is rooted on the head.

== Origin ==
Tetrapod legs evolved in the Devonian or Carboniferous geological period from the pectoral fins and pelvic fins of their crossopterygian fish ancestors. Fish fins develop along a "fin line", which runs from the back of the head along the midline of the back, round the end of the tail, and forwards along the underside of the tail, and at the cloaca splits into left and right fin lines which run forwards to the gills. In the paired ventral part of the fin line, normally only the pectoral and pelvic fins survive (but the Devonian acanthodian fish Mesacanthus developed a third pair of paired fins); but along the non-paired parts of the fin line, other fins develop.

In tetrapods, only the four paired fins normally persisted, and became the four legs. Notomelia and cephalomelia are atavistic reappearances of dorsal fins. Some other cases of polymelia are extra development along the paired part of the fin lines, or along the ventral posterior non-paired part of the fin line.

== Notable cases ==
=== Humans ===
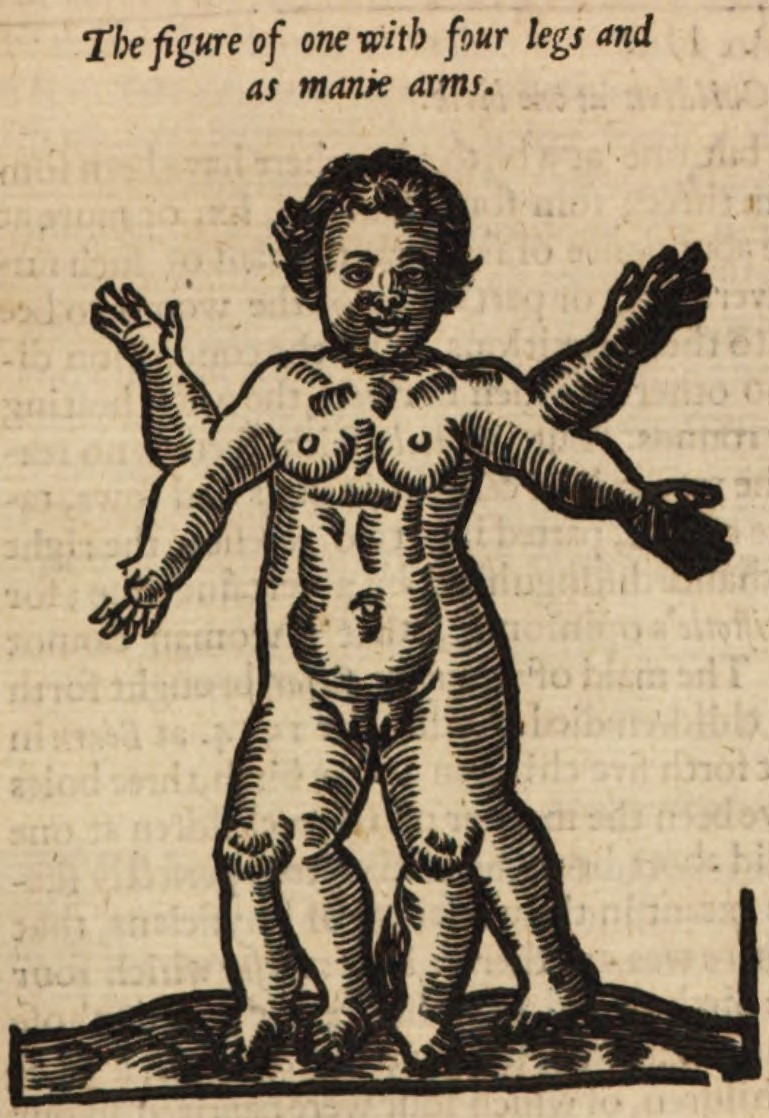
German case, born 1529

- 1529: A male child was born in Germany on January 9 with all four limbs duplicated at the elbows. He was described by Ambroise Pare in Of Monsters & Prodigies.
- 1889: Frank Lentini, an Italian-American sideshow performer, was born with a third leg, as well as a fourth foot and two sets of genitals
- 1995: Somali baby girl born with three left arms.
- March 2006: a baby boy identified only as Jie-jie was born in Shanghai with a fully formed third arm: he had two full-sized left arms, one ventral to the other. This is the only documented case of a child born with a fully formed supernumerary arm. It is an example of an extra limb on a normal body axis.
- November 6, 2007: doctors at Bangalore's Sparsh Hospital in Bangalore, India successfully completed surgery on a two-year-old girl named Lakshmi Tatma who was born with four arms and four legs; this was not true polymelia but a case of ischiopagus conjoined twins where one twin's head had disappeared during development.

=== Other animals ===
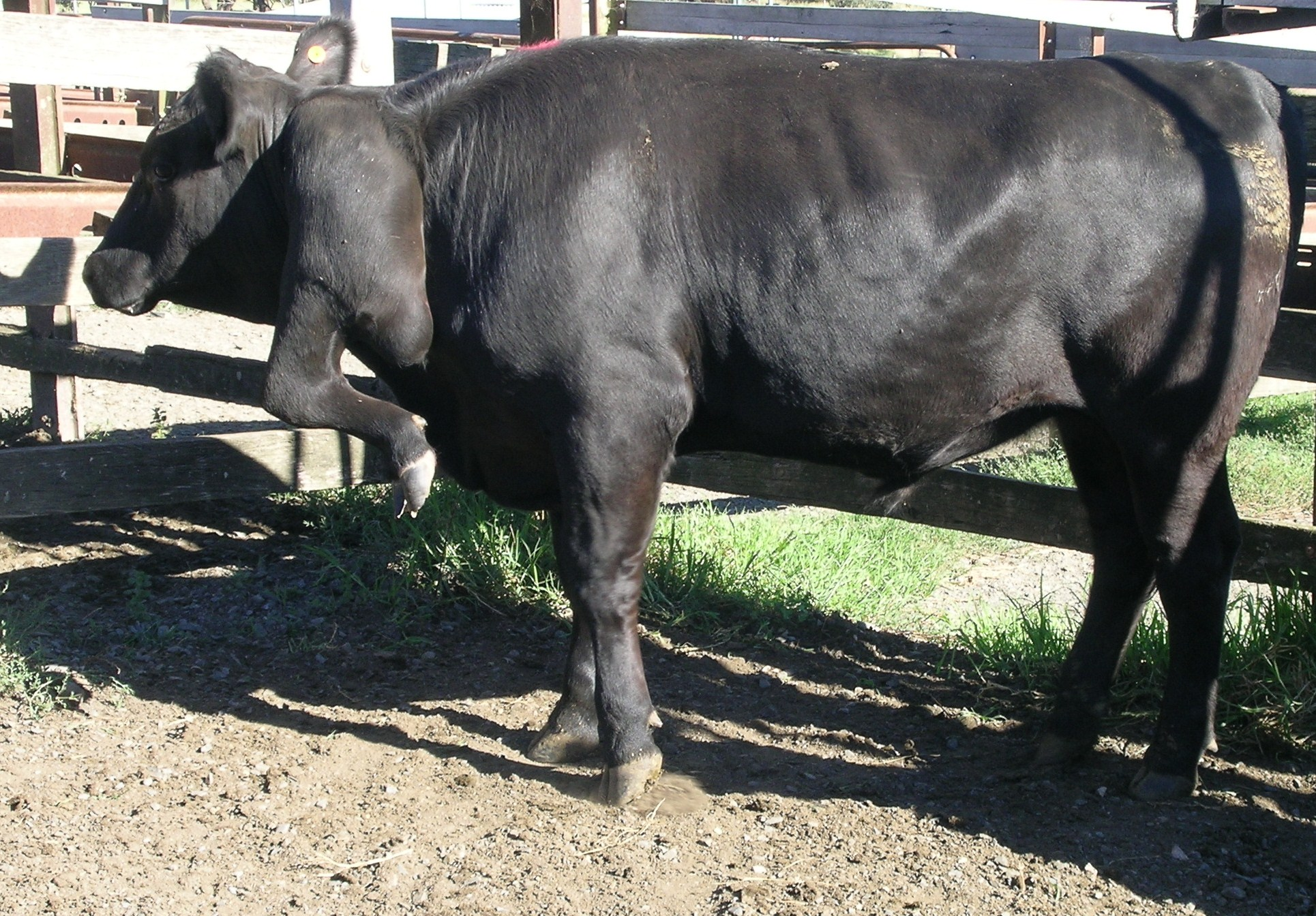
A grown steer with five legs.

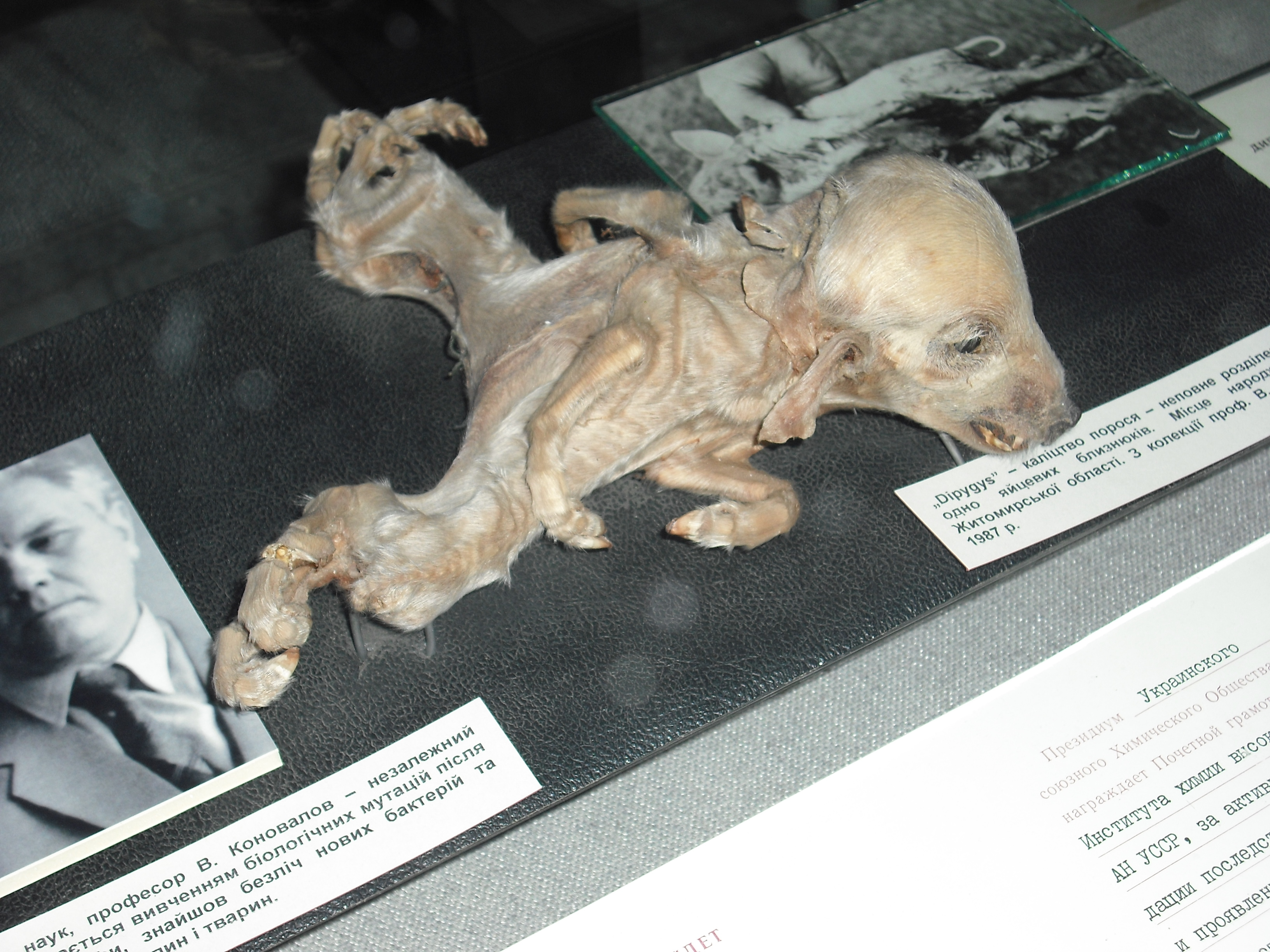
Piglet with dipygus at the Ukrainian National Chernobyl Museum in Kyiv

- A four-legged chicken was born at Brendle Farms in Somerset, Pennsylvania, in 2005. The story was carried on the major TV network news programs and USA Today. The bird was found living normally among the rest of the chickens after 18 months. She was adopted and named Henrietta by the farm owner's 13-year-old daughter, Ashley, who refuses to sell the chicken. The second (hind) legs are fully formed but non-functional.
- Four-legged ducks are occasionally hatched, such as 'Stumpy', an individual born in February 2007 on a farm in Hampshire, England.
- Frogs in the US sometimes are affected by polymelia when attacked in the tadpole stage by the Ribeiroia parasite.
- A puppy, known as Lilly, was born in the United States with a fully formed fifth leg jutting out between her hind legs. She was initially set to be sold to a freak show, but was instead bought by a dog lover who had the extra leg removed.
- An eight-legged lamb has been reported on at least two occasions including in 1898 and 2018.

== In mythology ==
Many mythological creatures like dragons, winged horses, and griffins have six limbs: four legs and two wings. The dragon's science is discussed in Dragons: A Fantasy Made Real. Additionally, angels are often depicted with two arms, two legs, and two wings.

In Greek mythology:

- The Hekatonkheires were said to each have one hundred hands.
- The Gegenees were a race of giants with six arms.
- The centaurs had six limbs: four horse legs and two human arms.

Sleipnir, Odin's horse in Norse mythology, has eight normal horse legs, and is usually depicted with limbs twinned at the shoulder or hip.

Several Hindu deities are depicted with multiple arms and sometimes also multiple legs.

== In popular culture ==
- Edward Albee's stage play The Man Who Had Three Arms tells the story of a fictional individual who was normal at birth but eventually sprouted a third functional arm, protruding from between his shoulder blades. After several years of living with three arms, the extra limb was reabsorbed into his body and the man became physically normal again. In Albee's play, the title character is angered that we (the audience) seem to be much more interested in the period of his life when he had three arms, rather than his normal life before and after that interval.
- Monty Python's Flying Circus performed a skit about a man with three buttocks. He believes that he has been invited to be interviewed on television because he is a nice person, and is dismayed to learn that he has only been invited because the interviewer is curious about his unusual condition.
- The Dark Backward is a 1991 comedy film directed and written by Adam Rifkin, which features Judd Nelson as an unfunny garbage man who pursues a stand-up comedy career. When the "comedian" grows a third arm out of his back, he becomes an overnight hit.
- Justice, the main antagonist in the anime Afro Samurai, has a fully formed extra arm protruding from his right shoulder.
- Paco, a playable character in Brawlout, is a four-armed frog- and shark-like creature.
- Spiral, character in the X-Men stories of Marvel Comics, has six arms.
- A 6-armed Spider-Man frequently appears as an alternate reality incarnation of the character, and is sometimes referred to as "Polymelian".
- In the Mortal Kombat series, the Shokan is a race of humanoids known to have four arms.
- Ibid: A Life is a fictional biography of Jonathan Blashette, a man with three legs.
- Zaphod Beeblebrox, a character in Douglas Adams' Hitchhiker's Guide to the Galaxy, has a third arm as well as a second head.
- The Pokémon Machamp (the second evolution of Machop) has four arms.
- Ryomen Sukuna, the antagonist of the manga series Jujutsu Kaisen, appears as an oversized human with four arms and a malformed body.
- In Undertale, Muffet is an anthropomorphic spider with six arms.
- In Jurassic World: Rebirth, the Distortus rex is a mutant Tyrannosaurus rex with six limbs, possessing an ape-like pair of oversized arms.

== See also ==
- Dipygus
- Dysmelia
- Polydactyly
- Polysyndactyly
- Supernumerary body parts

== Sources ==
- Avian Diseases, 1985 Jan-Mar; 29(1): pp. 244–5. Polymelia in a broiler chicken., Anderson WI, Langheinrich KA, McCaskey PC.: "A polymelus monster was observed in a 7-week-old slaughterhouse chicken. The supernumerary limbs were smaller than the normal appendages but contained an equal number of digits.".
- Kim C, Yeo S, Cho G, Lee J, Choi M, Won C, Kim J, Lee S (2001). "Polymelia with two extra forelimbs at the right scapular region in a male Korean native calf". J. Vet. Med. Sci. 63 (10): 1161–4. doi:10.1292/jvms.63.1161. PMID 11714039.
- "Polymelia in the toad Bufo melanostictus" (PDF). Ias.ac.in.
