= Sparsh Hospital =

Hospital chain in India

- Company type: Private
- Industry: Healthcare
- Founded: 2006
- Founder: Dr. Sharan Shivaraj Patil
- Headquarters: Bengaluru, Karnataka, India
- Area served: India
- Key people: Dr. Sharan Shivaraj Patil (Chairman and Managing Director); Jasdeep Singh (Group CEO)
- Website: www.sparshhospital.com

Sparsh Hospital is an Indian multi-specialty hospital chain headquartered in Bengaluru, Karnataka, India. It was founded in 2006 by orthopedic surgeon Dr. Sharan Shivaraj Patil, and operates a network of hospitals in Bengaluru and other parts of Karnataka.

== History ==
Sparsh Hospital was founded in 2006 by Dr. Sharan Shivaraj Patil as an orthopedic hospital in Health City, Bengaluru. In 2007, the hospital received international media attention following the surgery of Lakshmi Tatma, a child born with multiple extra limbs due to a rare congenital condition.

In 2015, Sparsh started a multispeciality hospital in Yeshwanthpur, Bengaluru. In 2018, the hospital group acquired a hospital in Hassan, Karnataka.

In 2022, Narayana Hrudayalaya Limited acquired Sparsh's orthopedic hospital in Health City, Bengaluru, for approximately ₹200 crore.

In 2024, Sparsh started a 250-bed facility in Yelahanka, Bengaluru. In 2025, the group opened two new hospitals in Bengaluru: a 300-bed hospital in Hennur Road and a 250-bed facility in Sarjapur Road.

== Financials ==
According to credit rating reports, the group's operating entity, Shiva & Shiva Orthopaedic Hospital Private Limited, which manages the group's seven multi-specialty hospitals, had an operating income of ₹557.82 crore in financial year 2024-25. The company is fully owned by Dr. Sharan Shivaraj Patil and his wife Meena Patil.

== See also ==
- Healthcare in India
- List of hospitals in India
