= Românii au talent =

- Created by: Simon Cowell
- Presented by: Pavel Bartoș; Smiley
- Judges: Andi Moisescu; Andra; Mihai Petre; Smiley; Florin Călinescu; Alexandra Dinu; Bebe Cotimanis; Mihaela Rădulescu; Dragoș Bucur; Mihai Bobonete; Carmen Tănase; Nadia Comăneci
- Country of origin: Romania
- No. of seasons: 15
- No. of episodes: 247

Production
- Running time: 180–240 minutes
- Production company: Fremantle

Original release
- Network: Pro TV
- Release: 18 February 2011 – present

Românii au talent (English: Romanians got talent) is a TV show which began airing on 18 February 2011. The project acts as a Romanian version of the franchise Got Talent, developed by Simco Limited. The show is hosted by Smiley and Pavel Bartoș, while the opening judge panel consisted of presenter Andi Moisescu, singer Andra and dancer Mihai Petre and presently consisting of Moisescu, Nadia Comăneci, Andra, and Mihai Bobonete. The winner of "Românii au talent" is awarded with €120,000.

== Auditions ==
The auditions take place in front of the judges and a live audience at different cities across Romania and Moldova. Unlike X Factor, at any time during the audition, the judges may show disapproval to the act by pressing a buzzer which lights a large red "X" on the stage, indicating that they particularly dislike the act and do not wish the performance to continue. If all the judges press their buzzers, the act must end immediately.

== Callbacks ==
After the auditions, the judges have to whittle almost 200 successful acts down to just 48 (in Series 1), 60 (in Series 2-6), 50 (in Series 7-8), 24(in Series 9-14), 36(in Series 15 onwards). All of the performers are called back to discover if they have progressed to the live semi-finals.

== Season synopses ==
=== Season 1 (2011) ===
The first commercials for the show were first aired in the Summer of 2010. The application process started on 2 July 2010. The judges firstly visited Constanța, Piatra Neamț, Timișoara, Bucharest and Cluj-Napoca. The show first aired on 18 February 2011. The first episode was a big success for the ratings. Pro TV not only managed to have the biggest audience during the show, but managed to make "Romania's Got Talent" the most viewed television show since 2004 in Romania, beating its own records for the show Dansez pentru tine (Dancing with the Stars), another popular show in Romania broadcast by Pro TV.

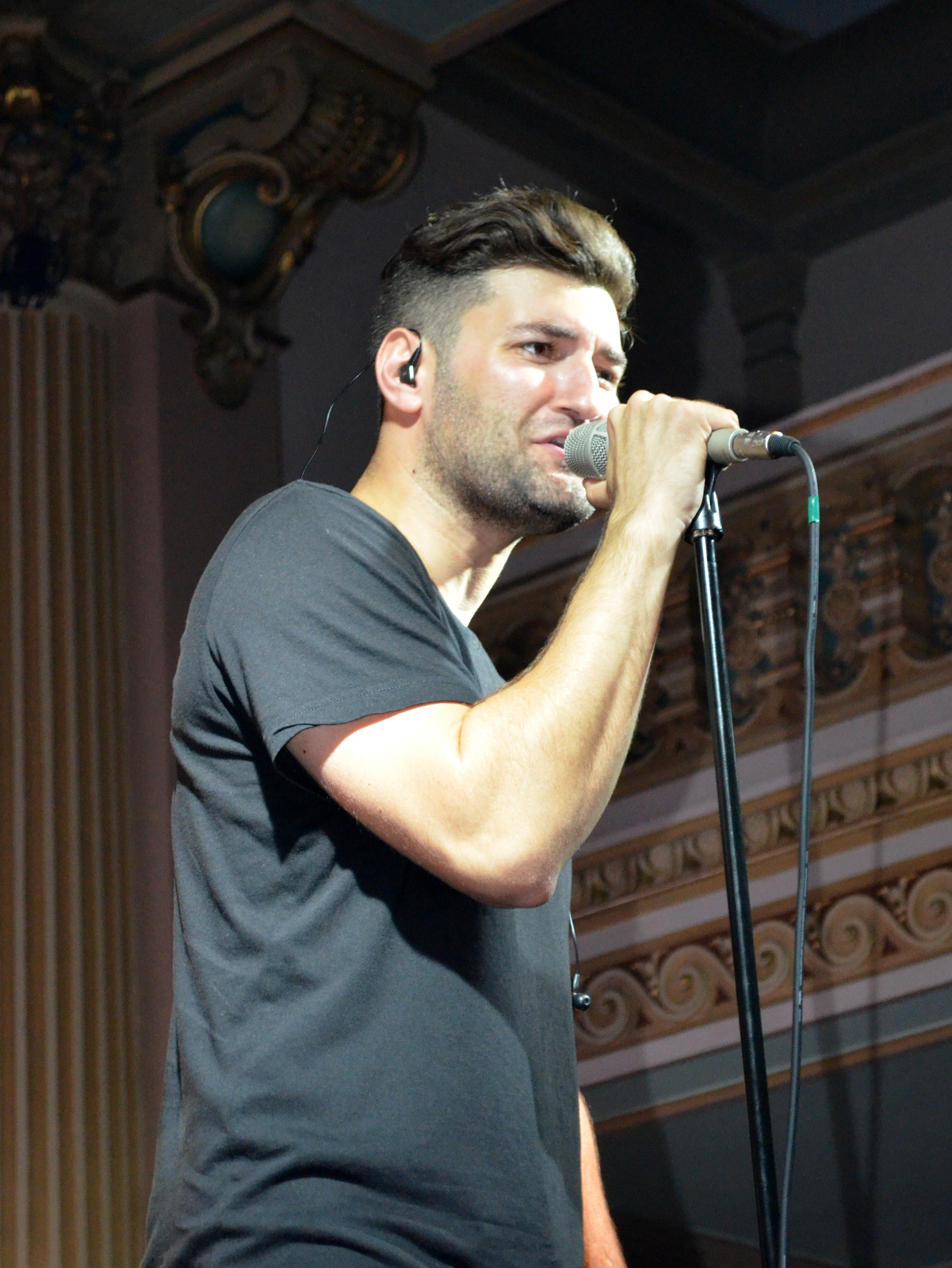
Smiley

Out of hundreds of contestants, only 200 won the local selection, having 1 or no X-es. The jury decided only 48 finalists. According to Pro TV's website, each contestant that qualified for the semifinals, were voted by the general public through text messages. The semi-finals were broadcast in four editions: In 1 April, 2 April respectively 8–9 April 2011. In each edition, twelve contestants had to pass the juries and get as many votes from the general public in order to proceed further to the finals, the last step to the grand prize. Twelve acts were qualified for the grand final. The votes were given only by phone or sms, the voting started after the last semifinal, stopped during the final performances, and started again after the last performance.

The award, the winner of the first season, was rapper Adrian Țuțu.

=== Season 2 (2012) ===
For the second season, ProTV kept the same team, Smiley and Pavel Bartoș presenters, Andra, Mihai Petre and Andi Moisescu jurors. The season started with a bigger audience than the first. The first episode from auditions had a 21.8 rating, compared to 18 points for the similar episode of the first season. The auditions were extended to six cities. Constanța, Timișoara, Bucharest and Cluj-Napoca were kept, and Iași and Craiova were added. The auditions took place between August and September 2011. The first episode was broadcast on 17 February and it was again a big hit for ProTV. They decided to air seven auditions episodes, instead of six for the first season. Also, the number of contestants qualified for the semifinals was extended from 48 to 60. There were five semifinals, three acts from each semifinal qualified for the final, two voted via phone or sms and the third voted by the jurors. Comparing to the first season, the second had three more acts in the final, the total number being 15. The voting system was kept, the lines were opened after the last semifinal, closed during the final performances, and opened again after the last performance in the final.

The winner of the second season, was magician Cristian Gog.

=== Season 3 (2013) ===
Auditions for the third season of Romania's Got Talent were in summer 2012. The first episode brought the highest audience for a debut of a season registered so far, over five million viewers per minute.

The winner of the third season, was dog trainer Bruno Icobeț.

=== Season 4 (2014) ===
Auditions for the fourth season of Romania's Got Talent were in summer 2013.

The winners of the fourth season, were Moldovian opera singers Brio Sonores.

=== Season 5 (2015) ===
==== Final (12 June) ====
| Key | Winner | Runner-up | Golden buzzer |

| Artist | Order | Act | Finished | Result | Ref |
|---|---|---|---|---|---|
| Bogdan Dumitraşcu | 1 | Singer | Unknown | | |
| Viorel Scânteie & Bibi | 2 | Dog act | Unknown | | |
| The Beat | 3 | Child rock band | 3 | | |
| Bianca Cristina Costiug | 4 | Tribal fusion dance | Unknown | | |
| Robert Tudor | 5 | Magician | Unknown | | |
| Nicoleta Iancu | 6 | Singer | Unknown | | |
| Yeva Shiyanova | 7 | Bar dance | Unknown | | |
| Ion Barbu | 8 | Singer | Unknown | | |
| Oana Zara & Alex Bordea | 9 | Contemporany dance | Unknown | | |
| Alexandru Moraru | 10 | Singer and guitarist | Unknown | | |
| Kid A | 11 | Dance | Unknown | | |
| Elena Carmen Cernea | 12 | Soprano | Unknown | | |
| Cristian Leana | 11 | Speedcubing | 1 | First Place | |
| Concertino | 14 | Voice and instrumental artists | Unknown | | |
| Bogdan Bolohan | 15 | Dance | 2 | Second Place | |

- Originality prize winner: Cosmin Cioca

=== Season 6 (2016) ===
==== Final (3 June) ====
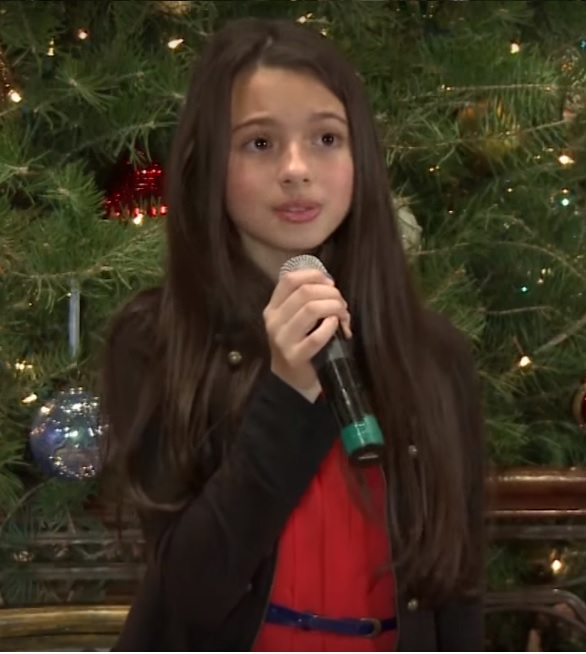
Opera singer Laura Bretan was the winner of Season 6

| Key | Winner | Runner-up | Golden buzzer |

| Artist | Order | Act | Finished | Result | Ref |
|---|---|---|---|---|---|
| Florin Bontea | 1 | Street Dancer | 12 | Eliminated | |
| Lifestyle | 2 | Dancing & singing group | 10 | Eliminated | |
| Cristian Zlatan | 3 | Dancer | 14 | Eliminated | |
| Mara Prună | 4 | Singer | 4 | Eliminated | |
| Anisia Gafton | 5 | Comedian | 6 | Originality prize winner | |
| Bruce & Istvan | 6 | Dance Duo | 15 | Eliminated | |
| Florin Zgăvârdici și Constantin Bardan | 7 | Singer & Pianist | 9 | Eliminated | |
| Resciebelle Santiago | 8 | Singer | 11 | Eliminated | |
| Cezara Blioju | 9 | Dancer | 13 | Eliminated | |
| Laura Bretan^{1} | 10 | Opera singer | 1 | First Place | |
| Free Balance | 11 | Dance Duo | 16 | Eliminated | |
| Rustin Dust | 12 | Band | 7 | Eliminated | |
| Andrei Surdu | 13 | Pianist | 8 | Eliminated | |
| Nadia Buduruși | 14 | Polo dancer | Final | Eliminated | |
| Manuel Chivari | 15 | Singer | 5 | Eliminated | |
| Frații Adrian | 16 | Dancing duo | 2 | Second Place | |

=== Season 7 (2017) ===
==== Final (2 June) ====
| Key | Winner | Runner-up | Judges' wildcard | Golden buzzer |

| Artist | Order | Act | Finished | Result | Ref |
|---|---|---|---|---|---|
| Beniamin Dumbrăvan | 1 | Beatbox | 9 | Eliminated | |
| Run to Infinity | 2 | Pole bare acrobatics | 11 | Eliminated | |
| George Aghinea | 3 | Singer | 7 | Eliminated | |
| Lorelai Moșneguțu | 4 | Meromelia singer | 1 | First Place | |
| Hera Zăuleț și Marius Moldovan | 5 | Contemporany dance | 8 | Eliminated | |
| Aeros | 6 | Acrobatic and gymnastic | 10 | Eliminated | |
| Paula Rad | 7 | Opera singer | 6 | Eliminated | |
| Fang Shuang | 8 | Singer | 3 | Eliminated | |
| Florin Nae | 9 | Singer | 5 | Eliminated | |
| OK World Wide | 10 | Stunt troupe | 2 | Second place | |
| Eva Timuș | 11 | Singer | 4 | Eliminated | |

- Originality prize winner: Eduard Antal

=== Season 8 (2018) ===
==== Final (1 June) ====
| Key | Winner | Runner-up |

| Artist | Order | Act | Finished | Result |
|---|---|---|---|---|
| Ripperz Crew | 1 | Street dancers | 7 | Eliminated |
| Nicholas Obedeanu Mihalache | 2 | Pianist | 11 | Eliminated |
| Cesima Nechifor | 3 | Contemporary dancer | 10 | Eliminated |
| Alex Ștefănescu | 4 | Gitarist, singer and comedian | 9 | Eliminated |
| Natalia Lukiv și Bogdan Boie | 5 | Dancers | 6 | Eliminated |
| Emil Rengle | 6 | Dancer | 1 | First Place, Originality prize winner |
| Amelia Uzun și Ana Cernicova | 7 | Mother and daughter singers | 5 | Eliminated |
| Bianca Badea | 8 | Ballerina | 2 | Second place |
| Sergiu Hudrea | 9 | Gitarist | 8 | Eliminated |
| Duo Romance | 10 | Stunt dance duo | 4 | Eliminated |
| Alla | 11 | Contemporary dancer | 3 | Eliminated |

== Series summary ==
| Series | Start | Finish | Winner | Runner-up | Third Place | Host(s) | Judges | Sponsor |
|---|---|---|---|---|---|---|---|---|
| One | 18 February 2011 | 25 April 2011 | Adrian Țuțu | Narcis Iustin Ianău | Valentin Dinu | Smiley; Pavel Bartoș | Andi Moisescu; Andra; Mihai Petre | Coca-Cola, Cosmote |
| Two | 7 February 2012 | 11 May 2012 | Cristian Gog | Mihai Petraiche | Cristian Leana | Smiley; Pavel Bartoș | Andi Moisescu; Andra; Mihai Petre | Coca-Cola, Cosmote |
| Three | 15 February 2013 | 10 May 2013 | Bruno Icobeț | Vlad Grigorescu | Eduard Andrei Sandu | Smiley; Pavel Bartoș | Andi Moisescu; Andra; Mihai Petre | Coca-Cola, Cosmote |
| Four | 14 February 2014 | 16 May 2014 | Brio Sonores | Leon Magdan | Andrei Cerbu | Smiley; Pavel Bartoș | Andi Moisescu; Andra; Mihai Petre | Coca-Cola, Cosmote |
| Five | 13 March 2015 | 12 June 2015 | Speedcubing | Bogdan Bolohan | The Beat | Smiley; Pavel Bartoș | Andi Moisecu; Mihaela Rădulescu; Andra; Bebe Cotimanis | Telekom |
| Six | 19 February 2016 | 3 June 2016 | Laura Bretan | Frații Adrian | Nadia Buduruși | Smiley; Pavel Bartoș | Andi Moisecu; Mihaela Rădulescu; Andra; Florin Călinescu | Telekom |
| Seven | 17 February 2017 | 2 June 2017 | Lorelai Moșneguțu | OK World Wide | Fang Shuang | Smiley; Pavel Bartoș | Andi Moisecu; Mihaela Rădulescu; Andra; Florin Călinescu | Telekom |
| Eight | 16 February 2018 | 1 June 2018 | Emil Rengle | Bianca Badea | Alla | Smiley; Pavel Bartoș | Andi Moisecu; Mihaela Rădulescu; Andra; Florin Călinescu | Telekom |
| Nine | 15 February 2019 | 31 May 2019 | Ana Maria Pantaze | Aris Negoiță | Corul de copii al Operei Naționale | Smiley; Pavel Bartoș | Andi Moisescu; Andra; Mihai Petre; Florin Călinescu | Telekom |
| Ten | 7 February 2020 | 29 May 2020 | Radu Palaniță | Sienna Vușcan | Mihai Țigaret | Smiley; Pavel Bartoș | Andi Moisescu; Andra; Mihai Petre; Florin Călinescu | Lidl |
| Eleven | 5 February 2021 | 28 May 2021 | Ana-Maria Mărgean | Ghintan Ion Mihail (GIM) | Art of Robots | Smiley; Pavel Bartoș | Andi Moisescu; Andra; Alexandra Dinu; Florin Călinescu | Lidl |
| Twelve | 4 February 2022 | 27 May 2022 | Darius Mabda | Emanuel Ion | Martina Meola | Smiley; Pavel Bartoș | Andi Moisescu; Andra; Dragoș Bucur; Mihai Bobonete | Lidl |
| Thirteen | 20 January 2023 | 12 May 2023 | Rares Prisacariu | Olya si Valera | Oleg Spînu | Smiley; Pavel Bartoș | Andi Moisescu; Andra; Dragoș Bucur; Mihai Bobonete | Lidl |
| Fourteen | 9 February 2024 | 31 May 2024 | Cristian Ciaușu | Ana Nuta | Ansamblul Hecenii | Smiley; Pavel Bartoș | Andi Moisescu; Andra; Dragoș Bucur; Mihai Bobonete | Lidl |
| Fifteen | 31 January 2025 | 23 May 2025 | Damaris Lupu | Sara Hant | Alexia Tudose | Smiley; Pavel Bartoș | Andi Moisescu; Andra; Dragoș Bucur; Mihai Bobonete | Lidl |
| Sixteen | 23 January 2026 | 29 May 2026 | Re-Born | Albert Oprea | Antonia Voroneanu | Smiley; Pavel Bartoș | Andi Moisescu; Andra; Mihai Bobonete; Carmen Tanase | Lidl |
| Seventeen | 2027 | 2027 | | | | Smiley; Pavel Bartoș | Andi Moisescu; Andra; Mihai Bobonete; Nadia Comăneci | Lidl |

== Series overview ==
Românii au talent series overview
| Season | Winner | Host | Judges(Chairs' order) | | | |
| Season | Winner | Host | 1 | 2 | 3 | 4 |
|---|---|---|---|---|---|---|
| 1 | Adrian Țuțu | Smiley; Pavel Bartoș | Andi Moisescu | Andra Măruță | Mihai Petre | - |
| 2 | Cristian Gog | Smiley; Pavel Bartoș | Andi Moisescu | Andra Măruță | Mihai Petre | - |
| 3 | Bruno Icobăț | Smiley; Pavel Bartoș | Andi Moisescu | Andra Măruță | Mihai Petre | - |
| 4 | Brio Sonores | Smiley; Pavel Bartoș | Andi Moisescu | Andra Măruță | Mihai Petre | - |
| 5 | Speedcubing | Smiley; Pavel Bartoș | Andi Moisescu | Andra Măruță | Mihaela Rădulescu | Bebe Cotimanis |
| 6 | Laura Bretan | Smiley; Pavel Bartoș | Andi Moisescu | Andra Măruță | Mihaela Rădulescu | Florin Călinescu |
| 7 | Lorelai Moșneguțu | Smiley; Pavel Bartoș | Andi Moisescu | Andra Măruță | Mihaela Rădulescu | Florin Călinescu |
| 8 | Emil Rengle | Smiley; Pavel Bartoș | Andi Moisescu | Andra Măruță | Mihaela Rădulescu | Florin Călinescu |
| 9 | Ana Maria Pantaze | Smiley; Pavel Bartoș | Andi Moisescu | Andra Măruță | Mihai Petre | Florin Călinescu |
| 10 | Radu Palaniță | Smiley; Pavel Bartoș | Andi Moisescu | Andra Măruță | Mihai Petre | Florin Călinescu |
| 11 | Ana-Maria Mărgean | Smiley; Pavel Bartoș | Andi Moisescu | Andra Măruță | Alexandra Dinu | Florin Călinescu |
| 12 | Darius Mabda | Smiley; Pavel Bartoș | Andi Moisescu | Andra Măruță | Dragoș Bucur | Mihai Bobonete |
| 13 | Rareș Prisacariu | Smiley; Pavel Bartoș | Andi Moisescu | Andra Măruță | Dragoș Bucur | Mihai Bobonete |
| 14 | Cristian Ciaușu | Smiley; Pavel Bartoș | Andi Moisescu | Andra Măruță | Dragoș Bucur | Mihai Bobonete |
| 15 | Damaris Lupu | Smiley; Pavel Bartoș | Andi Moisescu | Andra Măruță | Dragoș Bucur | Mihai Bobonete |
| 16 | Re-born | Smiley; Pavel Bartoș | Andi Moisescu | Andra Măruță | Carmen Tănase | Mihai Bobonete |
| 17 | | Smiley; Pavel Bartoș | Andi Moisescu | Andra Măruță | Nadia Comăneci | Mihai Bobonete |

== Overall ratings summary ==
The first episode was a big success for the ratings. Pro TV not only managed to have the biggest audience during the show, but managed to make "Romania's Got Talent" the most viewed television show since 2004 in Romania, beating its own records for the show Dansez pentru tine (Dancing with the Stars), another popular show in Romania broadcast by Pro TV.

| Season | Timeslot (EEST) | Season premiere | Premiere viewers (in millions) | Season finale | Finale viewers (in millions) | TV season | Rank |
|---|---|---|---|---|---|---|---|
| 1 | Friday 8:30 P.M. Saturday 8:30 P.M. | 8 February 2011 | 3.21 | 22 April 2011 | 2.11 | 2011 | #1 |
| 2 | Friday 8:30 P.M. | 17 February 2012 | 2.29 | 11 May 2012 | 1.94 | 2012 | #1 |
| 3 | Friday 8:30 P.M. | 15 February 2013 | 5.31 | 10 May 2013 | 2.5 | 2013 | #1 |
| 4 | Friday 8:30 P.M. | 14 February 2014 | 4.91 | 16 May 2014 | 3.07 | 2014 | #1 |
| 5 | Friday 8:30 P.M. | 13 March 2015 | 4.36 | 12 June 2015 | 2.26 | 2015 | #1 |
| 6 | Friday 8:30 P.M. | 19 February 2016 | 3.676 | 3 June 2016 | 2.192 | 2016 | #1 |
| 7 | Friday 8:30 P.M. | 17 February 2017 | 3.699 | 2 June 2017 | 1.64 | 2017 | #1 |
| 8 | Friday 8:30 P.M. | 16 February 2018 | 3.431 | 1 June 2018 | 1.7 | 2018 | #1 |
| 9 | Friday 8:30 P.M. | 8 February 2019 | 3.57 | 31 May 2019 | 2.04 | 2019 | #1 |
| 10 | Friday 8:30 P.M. | 7 February 2020 | 2.66 | 29 May 2020 | 2.2 | 2020 | #1 |
| 11 | Friday 8:30 P.M. | 5 February 2021 | 2.61 | 28 May 2021 | 2.08 | 2021 | #1 |
| 12 | Friday 8:30 P.M. | 4 February 2022 | 2.66 | 27 May 2022 | 1.71 | 2022 | #1 |
| 13 | Friday 8:30 P.M. | 20 January 2023 | 2.52 | 12 May 2023 | 1.94 | 2023 | #1 |
| 14 | Friday 8:30 P.M | 9 February 2024 | 2.37 | 31 May 2024 | 1.71 | 2024 | #1 |
| 15 | Friday 8:30 P.M | 31 January 2025 | 2.04 | 23 May 2025 | 1.59 | 2025 | #1 |
| 16 | Friday 8:30 P.M | 23 January 2026 | 1.84 | 29 May 2026 | | 2026 | |

== Notes ==
1. Laura Bretan qualified directly into the final without being in the semifinals.
2. UDI Team were disqualified from the semifinals because of war
