= Cristian Gog =

Romanian mentalist

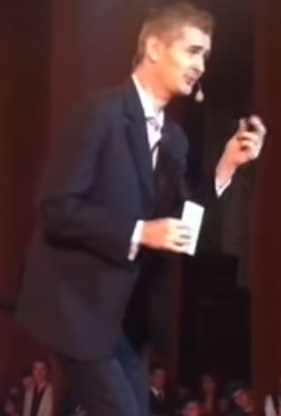
Cristian Gog

Cristian Simion Gog (born August 27, 1981) is a Romanian mentalist known for winning the second season of Romania's Got Talent.

== Early life and education ==
Born in Câmpeni, Alba County, Gog got interested in magic tricks as a child. He attended general school and high school in Baia de Arieș. During his college years he gained an interest in mentalism.

He graduated from the Department of Commerce, Tourism and Services from University of Alba Iulia and obtained a master's degree in Business Administration at the same university.

== Romania's Got Talent ==
In 2012, he participated in Romania's Got Talent and won the competition with public votes, obtaining a prize worth €120,000.

== Controversy ==
Cristian Gog's numbers were described as "cheap tricks bought on the internet". A publication by Libertatea explains how he bent the coins with two magnetic rings and how his spoons "changed the consistency" were made of gallium having a melting point of about 30°C. The publication also states that the tricks performed by Gog during the show, as well as the accessories used by him, were bought from sites belonging to the field of illusionism. Gog later stated in an interview: "I never claimed that what I do on stage is real."
