= Munis Dundar =

Turkish geneticist (born 1961)

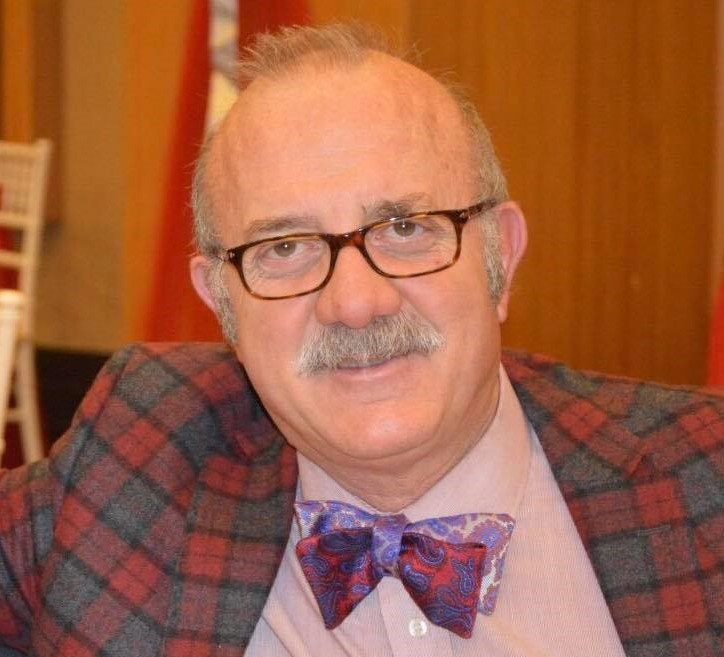
- Born: May 2, 1961 (age 65); Estel
- Education: Erciyes University (MD, 1985); University of Glasgow (PhD, 2003)
- Children: 3
- Awards: The most article on journals indexed by SCI award in Erciyes University (2003); EBTNA service award (2011)
- Website: munisdundar.com

Notes
- Web of Science H Index: 20, Cited Numbers: 2385

Munis Dundar ("Dündar" in Turkish) is a professor of Medical Genetics and head of the Medical Genetics Department at Erciyes University, Kayseri, Turkey. He is founder of Erciyes University Medical Genetics Department and has carried out various administrative tasks since 1996. He defined four genetic syndromes in the medical literature: the “Dundar Syndrome”, “Dundar Acropectoral Syndrome”, “Scoliosis, Blindness and Arachnodactyly Syndrome” and “Multiple Congenital Abnormalities and Mental Retardation Syndrome”. He has taken part as project coordinator and assistant investigator in many research projects and has prepared articles published in international journals since 1995. He is the president of European Biotechnology Thematic Network Association (EBTNA) and representative from Turkey. He is also the editor-in-chief of The EuroBiotech Journal.

== Publications and Defined Syndromes ==
There are more than 150 articles in which Munis Dundar is corresponding or co-author including researches on new syndromes defined by himself:

- Dundar Syndrome, 1997
- Dundar Acropectoral Syndrome, 2001
- Blindness, Scoliosis and Arachnodactyly Syndrome 2008
- Multiple Congenital Abnormalities and Mental Retardation 2012

All syndromes are in International Catalogs such as, Online Mendelian Inheritance in Man and Oxford Medical Databases.

== Dundar Syndrome ==
Dundar et al. described patients with Mental Motor Retardation, ocular abnormality, dysmorphic facial appearance, long fingers, and distal arthrogryposis with severely adducted thumbs and clubfeet in Turkish family in 1997.

== Dundar Acropectoral Syndrome ==
In 2001 family with a distal limb and sternal abnormalities were reported by Dundar et al. This autosomal dominant disease signs which are syndactyly, preaxial polydactyly prominent and upper sternum were established in affected individuals. Dundar et al. (2001) noticed similarities with F syndrome but significant differences proved otherwise.

== Scoliosis, Arachnodactyly and Blindness Syndrome ==
In 2008 Dundar et al. described Turkish family with dominantly-inherited blindness, scoliosis and arachnodactyly.

== Multiple Congenital Abnormalities and Mental Retardation Syndrome ==
Two brothers with abnormal neurological development, short height, pylorus stenosis, pectus excavatum, craniosynostosis, large ears, thin upper lip and bilateral cryptorchidism were reported by Dundar et al. in 2012. While investigating these symptoms were concluded that the summary of findings is not seen in known syndromes and because of non-affected parents who are siblings, this is an autosomal recessive inherited new syndrome.

== Books ==
- Dündar M, Eds, Modern Biyoteknoloji Ve Uygulamalar, Erciyes Üniversitesi Yayınları, Kayseri, 2010
- Dündar M, Eds Dismorfolojide Terimler Ve Tanımlar, Erciyes Üniversitesi, KAYSERİ, 2015 ISBN 978-605-85579-3-2
- Dündar M, Eds. Current Applications of Biotechnology, mgroup, Kayseri, 2015
- Dündar M, Eds. Atlas of Dysmorphology and Diagnosis, mgroup, Kayseri, 2015

== Awards ==
- Scientific Publication Award by Erciyes University, 2003
- European Biotechnology Thematic Network Association service award, 2011
