= Johnson–Munson syndrome =

Rare syndrome

- Other names: Aphalangy-hemivertebrae-urogenital-intestinal dysgenesis syndrome

Aphalangy, hemivertebrae and urogenital-intestinal dysgenesis or Johnson-Munson syndrome is an extremely rare syndrome, described only in three siblings. It associates hypoplasia or aplasia of phalanges of hands and feet, hemivertebrae and various urogenital and/or intestinal abnormalities. Intrafamilial variability is important as one sister had lethal abnormalities (Potter sequence and pulmonary hypoplasia), while her affected brother was in good health with normal psychomotor development at 6 months of age. Prognosis seems to depend mainly on the severity of visceral malformations. Etiology and inheritance remain unknown.
