= Robert Tudor (magician) =

Romanian magician and illusionist

- Born: December 7, 1984 (age 40); Bucuresti, Romania
- Occupations: Magician; illusionist; entertainer
- Years active: 2003–present
- Known for: TV show Romanians have talent contestant
- Spouse: Elena Tudor
- Children: 2

Robert Tudor (born December 7, 1984) is a Romanian magician, entertainer, and television presenter. He is known for his magic numbers in the TV show Romanians have talent and the comic video, "Call baby".

== Early life and education ==
Tudor was born on December 7, 1984, in Bucharest, Romania. He obtained a training certificate from the Vienna School of Magic, Austria, in 2003.

== Career ==
Tudor first became interested in magic when he was 19 years old. He has stage performed in Copenhagen, Gothenburg, Brussels, London, Chișinău, and Blackpool. His comedic videos, such as "Call Baby", have gained significant attention on the internet.

Since 2003, Tudor has made numerous TV appearances at shows like, Cătălin Măruță show, Neatza cu Razvan si Dani (Neatza with Răzvan and Dani), Vorbeste lumea (The world speaks), Ce Spun Românii (What the Romanians say), and Jocuri de celebritate (Celebrity games).

He has been regularly invited to TV shows like iUmor (Antena 1), Next Star (Antena 1), New Year's Eve with Dan Negru 2021 (Antena 1), and New Year's Eve magic 2015 (Pro TV). During 2012–2013, he attended the improvisation programmes with Mihai Bobonete and Catalin Neamtu at Cafe Deko. From 2013 to 2014, he was part of the Improv Show along with Mihai Bobonete and producer Bogdan Naumovici. In 2015, he participated in the Pro TV's show, Romanians have talent (season 5), and qualified for the final.

From 2017 to 2018, Tudor co-hosted the reality talent show Vocea României Junior (Voice of Romania Junior) along with Mihai Bobonete. In 2021, he co-presented a show, Pe Bune ?!, with Cătălin Măruță.

== Personal life ==
Tudor is married to Elena Tudor and both have two children together.
