= Lakshmi Tatma =

Indian conjoined twin (born 2005)

Lakshmi Tatma लक्ष्मी तात्मा
- Lakshmi before her 27-hour surgery in 2007
- Born: 31 October 2005 (age 20); Bihar, India
- Known for: The viability of a pair of ischiopagus conjoined twins who underwent a successful separation surgery in Bangalore, India.

Lakshmi Tatma is an Indian woman born in 2005 in a village in Araria district, Bihar, with four arms and four legs. She was actually one of a pair of ischiopagus conjoined twins, one of which did not have a head because their head had atrophied and chest had not fully developed in the womb, causing the appearance of one child with four arms and four legs. Lakshmi has undergone surgery to remove her extra limbs.

== Background ==
Lakshmi's father, Shambhu, and mother, Poonam, were day labourers who earned less than 40 rupees per day and were unable to afford a separation surgery for their daughter. Their daughter was named after Lakshmi, the Hindu goddess of wealth (who is depicted as four-armed). The little girl was sometimes an object of worship as an incarnation of the goddess; by the age of two, she was known all over India. At one point, a circus offered the couple money to buy Lakshmi to dehumanize her in a sideshow, which forced the family into hiding. At the time of being found by Sharan Patil, she had an infected pressure ulcer at the neck end of the twin and continuous fevers.

The twins' two pelvises formed a single combined ring and each twin had one working kidney. Lakshmi had a second kidney which was necrotic. Her abdominal aorta gave off iliac branches to her legs and continued as a main trunk artery, which gave off iliac branches to the twin's legs and continued, and finally forked into the twin's subclavian arteries. The twin's spine and abdomen merged with Lakshmi's body. The twins' backbones were joined end-to-end and nerves were entangled. Lakshmi could not crawl well or walk, but she could drag herself around and had a clubfoot. Due to these circumstances surgery was needed.

== Surgery ==
Lakshmi's surgery was carried out by Sharan Patil and 30 other physicians, including Chief anaesthetist Yohannan John at Sparsh Hospital in Bangalore, Karnataka. Doctors surmised early on that without the operation, she would not be able to live into her teens. She was given a 75-80% chance of survival. The surgery began on Tuesday, 6 November 2007, at 7:00 a.m. IST (01:30 UTC), and was planned to last 40 hours at the most. An estimated cost of over $625,000 American dollars was paid entirely by the hospital's charitable wing, the Sparsh Foundation. A team of more than 30 surgeons worked in shifts, operating for 27 hours.

The steps of the operation were:

1. (8 hours): Abdominal operation: remove the twin's organs.
2. Remove Lakshmi's necrotic kidney and replace it with her sibling's kidney. Tie off the blood vessels that supplied her sibling.
3. Move the reproductive system and the urinary bladder into Lakshmi.
4. (6 to 8 hours) Amputate the second twin's legs at the hip joints: this caused heavy bleeding. Cut the joined backbone: the nerves around the joint were found to be extremely chaotic, and care had to be taken to avoid causing paralysis.
5. Lakshmi's sibling died at 12.30 a.m. on 7 November 2007. The combined pelvic ring was divided through or near the twin's hip joints and not at the pubic symphyses. The remaining incomplete pelvic ring was cut and bent to make the ends meet, and not left as an open part-circle.
6. External fixation to hold the parts of the pelvis in place. This caused the pelvis to close in three weeks to a healthier position.
7. (4 hours): Suturing. Operation completed at 10:00 a.m. on 7 November 2007.

Within a week of the surgery, doctors held a press conference showing Lakshmi being carried by her father. Her feet were still bandaged. She was in the hospital for a month after the operation.

Afterwards, she and her family moved to Sucheta Kriplani Shiksha Niketan in Jodhpur in Rajasthan, where Lakshmi and her brother joined a school for disabled children and her father got a job at the school's farm.

In February 2008, it was announced that a later operation was planned to bring her legs closer together and another operation was considered a possibility to rebuild her pelvic floor muscles.

A television program in 2010 showed her recovering well. It was found that cutting the conjoined vertebral column in the separation operation had not caused paralysis. She was operated on for clubfoot. X-rays showed that extra bone between the pubic symphysis (parts of the twin's ischium and pubis bones) had been absorbed or was not ossified. Slight scoliosis was found but would have to be corrected by a minor operation; her mother was unwilling for her to have to wear a spinal brace throughout childhood.
