= Fuat Dündar =

Turkish academic, associate

Fuat Dündar (born 1971) is a Turkish academic, associate professor at the TOBB University of Economics and Technology in Ankara and historian. He received a doctorate in history from the School for Advanced Studies in the Social Sciences in France, with a dissertation titled L'ingénierie Ethnique du Comité Union et Progrès et la Turcisation de l'Anatolie (1913-1918) ("The Ethnic Engineering of the Committee of Union and Progress and the Turkification of Anatolia (1913–1918)"). In a review of his book Crime of Numbers, Simon Payaslian states "That Dündar accepts Ottoman sources uncritically is the most fundamental problem with this work." Dündar also participated in Workshop for Armenian/Turkish Scholarship and contributed a chapter to its book, A Question of Genocide, in which he "provides a fresh interpretation of the deportation", according to Bedross Der Matossian, who nevertheless criticized the chapter for its incomplete understanding of the concentration camps in the Syrian desert as revealed in Armenian sources.

== Works ==
- Dündar, Fuat (2008). Modern Türkiye'nin Şifresi: İttihat Ve Terakki'nin Etnisite Mühendisliği (1913-1918) (in Turkish). İletişim Yayınları. ISBN 978-975-05-2485-1.
- Dundar, Fuat (2010). Crime of Numbers: The Role of Statistics in the Armenian Question (1878-1918). Transaction Publishers. ISBN 978-1-4128-4341-6.
- Dündar, Fuat (2013). İttihat ve Terakki'nin Müslümanları İskân Politikası (1913-1918) (in Turkish). İletişim Yayınları. ISBN 978-975-05-1482-1.
