= Wallis–Zieff–Goldblatt syndrome =

- Other names: Cleidorhizomelic syndrome
- Wallis–Zieff–Goldblatt syndrome has an autosomal dominant pattern of inheritance.

Wallis–Zieff–Goldblatt syndrome is a rare condition characterized by inherited skeletal disorders manifested mainly as rhizomelic short stature and lateral clavicular defects. It is also known as cleidorhizomelic syndrome.

== Presentation ==
An initial clinical report of this syndrome describes a 6-month-old boy with rhizomelic shortening, particularly in the arms, and protuberances over the lateral aspects of the clavicles. On radiographs the lateral third of the clavicles had a bifid appearance resulting from an abnormal process or protuberance arising from the fusion center. His 22-year-old mother also had a height of 142 cm with an arm span of 136 cm and rhizomelic shortness of the limbs, maximal in the arms, and abnormalities of the acromioclavicular joints. Both the mother and the son had marked bilateral clinodactyly of the fifth fingers associated with hypoplastic middle phalanx.
