= Meromelia =

- Specialty: Medical genetics

Meromelia is a birth defect characterized by the lacking of a part, but not all, of one or more limbs with the presence of a hand or foot. It results in a shrunken and deformed extremity.

== Cause ==
Such defects are mainly the results of genetic disorders, but some teratogenic (or environmental) factors have been identified, such as the use of thalidomide from 1957 to 1962 for morning sickness (NVP).

== Diagnosis ==
Meromelia is a birth defect characterized by lacking part of at least one free limb.

== Epidemiology ==
Approximately 0.000014% of live births result in meromelia.

== Etymology ==
The word meromelia comes from the Greek meros 'part, partial' + melia 'limb'.

== See also ==
- Amelia (birth defect)
- Amniotic band syndrome
- Phocomelia
- Polymelia
