= Catel–Manzke syndrome =

- Other names: Hyperphalangy-clinodactyly of index finger with Pierre Robin syndrome

Catel–Manzke syndrome is a rare genetic disorder characterized by distinctive abnormalities of the index fingers; the classic features of Pierre Robin syndrome; occasionally with additional physical findings.

== Signs and symptoms ==
The clinical presentation of this condition is consistent with the following (among others):

- Highly arched eyebrow
- Joint stiffness
- Scoliosis
- Short stature

== Diagnosis ==
Genetic Testing.

== Prevalence ==
Currently there are only around 26 people in the world that are known to have this rare condition. Inheritance is thought to be X-linked recessive.
