= Pavel Bartoș =

Romanian actor and television presenter

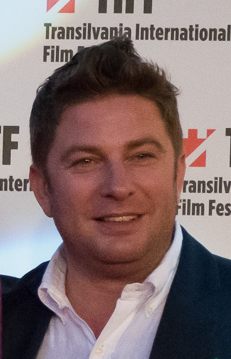
- Pavel Bartoș at Transilvania International Film Festival in 2016
- Born: 20 January 1975 (age 51); Miercurea Ciuc, Harghita, Socialist Republic of Romania
- Occupations: Actor; television presenter
- Spouse: Anca Bartoș

Pavel Bartoș (Romanian pronunciation: [ˈpavel ˈbartoʃ]; born 20 January 1975) is a Romanian actor and television presenter, best known for hosting Românii au talent (Romanians Got Talent) and Vocea României (The Voice of Romania).

He was also chosen by Disney Pixar to provide the Romanian voice of Randall in Monsters, Inc. and Monsters University. He has also had other voice acting roles in the Romanian dubs of Megamind (as Megamind), Sing (as Eddie) and The Secret Life of Pets (as Duke).

== Awards and nominations ==
- Marele Premiu la Gala Premiul Hystrion pentru interpretare – Festivalul de Arta Insolita, Cluj (1994) – Nominated
- Marele Premiu la Gala Tânărului Actor, Costinești (1998, 1999)
- Premiul de interpretare al Festivalului Teatrelor Minoritare din România (2001) – Nominated
