= Development of the human digestive system =

Mechanisms that form the digestive system in the human embryo

The development of the human digestive system in early embryonic development concerns the epithelium of the digestive system and the parenchyma of its derivatives, which originate from the endoderm. Connective tissue, muscular components, and peritoneal components originate in the mesoderm. Different regions of the gut tube such as the esophagus, stomach, duodenum, etc. are specified by a retinoic acid gradient that causes transcription factors unique to each region to be expressed. Differentiation of the gut and its derivatives depends upon reciprocal interactions between the gut endoderm and its surrounding mesoderm. Hox genes in the mesoderm are induced by a Hedgehog signaling pathway secreted by gut endoderm and regulate the craniocaudal organization of the gut and its derivatives. The gut system extends from the oropharyngeal membrane to the cloacal membrane and is divided into the foregut, midgut, and hindgut.

== Body cavities ==
At the end of the third week, the neural tube, which is a fold of one of the layers of the trilaminar germ disc, called the ectoderm, appears. This layer elevates and closes dorsally, while the gut tube rolls up and closes ventrally to create a "tube on top of a tube." The mesoderm, which is another layer of the trilaminar germ disc, holds the tubes together and the lateral plate mesoderm, the middle layer of the germ disc, splits to form a visceral layer associated with the gut and a parietal layer, which along with the overlying ectoderm, forms the lateral body wall. The space between the visceral and parietal layers of lateral plate mesoderm is the primitive body cavity. When the lateral body wall folds, it moves ventrally and fuses at the midline. The body cavity closes, except in the region of the connecting stalk. Here, the gut tube maintains an attachment to the yolk sac. The yolk sac is a membranous sac attached to the embryo, which provides nutrients and functions as the circulatory system of the very early embryo.

The lateral body wall folds, pulling the amnion in with it so that the amnion surrounds the embryo and extends over the connecting stalk, which becomes the umbilical cord, which connects the fetus with the placenta. If the ventral body wall fails to close, ventral body wall defects can result, such as ectopia cordis, a congenital malformation in which the heart is abnormally located outside the thorax. Another defect is gastroschisis, a congenital defect in the anterior abdominal wall through which the abdominal contents freely protrude. Another possibility is bladder exstrophy, in which part of the urinary bladder is present outside the body. In normal circumstances, the parietal mesoderm will form the parietal layer of serous membranes lining the outside (walls) of the peritoneal, pleural, and pericardial cavities. The visceral layer will form the visceral layer of the serous membranes covering the lungs, heart, and abdominal organs. These layers are continuous at the root of each organ as the organs lie in their respective cavities. The peritoneum, a serum membrane that forms the lining of the abdominal cavity, forms in the gut layers and in places mesenteries extend from the gut as double layers of peritoneum. Mesenteries provide a pathway for vessels, nerves, and lymphatics to the organs. Initially, the gut tube from the caudal end of the foregut to the end of the hindgut is suspended from the dorsal body wall by dorsal mesentery. Ventral mesentery, derived from the septum transversum, exists only in the region of the terminal part of the esophagus, the stomach, and the upper portion of the duodenum.

== Rotation and herniation ==
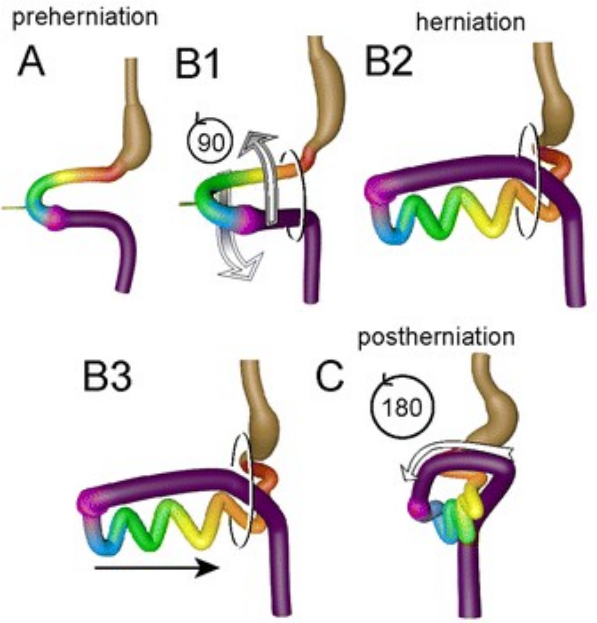
Diagram showing the process by which the intestine rotates and herniates during normal development. From panel A to B (left-sided views), the midgut loop rotates 90° in a counterclockwise direction (caudal-to-rostral view), so that its position changes from midsagittal (A) to transverse (B1). The small intestine forms loops (B2) and slides back into the abdomen (B3) during resolution of the hernia. Meanwhile, the cecum moves from the left to the right side, which represents the additional 180° counterclockwise rotation of the intestine (C, central view).

In the process of lengthening growth, the intestinal duct herniates and rotates. Herniation (Latin, meaning 'rupture') takes place at around 7½ weeks in the human embryo and refers to the retraction of the intestine from the extraembryonal navel coelom into the abdomen (panel B3).

The intestinal duct rotates by 90° (counterclockwise when viewing from tail-to-head) around the body axis (see panel B1) in the same direction as the heart. According to the Axial Twist theory, the rotation is part of a complex twist that involves the entire body in all vertebrate animals. During this twist, the anterior head region rotates 90° counterclockwise, the body 90° clockwise, but sparing the heart and bowels. Accordingly, the embryo turns on its side. The forebrain becomes turned around with respect to the while the heart and bowels (which do not take part in the twist) become turned counterclockwise with respect to the body.

Folding occurs in a typical manner as shown in the diagram (panel B2-3, C). The folding is a result of the elongation of the duct.

== Diaphragm and thoracic cavity ==
The diaphragm divides the body cavity into the thoracic cavity and the abdominal cavity. It develops from four components: the septum transversum (central tendon), the pleuroperitoneal membranes, the dorsal mesentery of the esophagus, and muscular components from somites at cervical levels three to five (C3–5) of the body wall. Since the septum transversum is located initially opposite cervical segments of three to five, and since muscle cells for the diaphragm originate from somites at these segments, the phrenic nerve, which innervates the diaphragm, also arises from these segments of the spinal cord (C3, 4, and 5). The thoracic cavity is divided into the pericardial cavity and two pleural cavities for the lungs by the pleuropericardial membranes.

== Divisions of the gut tube ==
As a result of the cephalocaudal and lateral folding of the embryo, a portion of the endoderm-lined yolk sac cavity is incorporated into the embryo to form the primitive gut. In the cephalic and caudal parts of the embryo, the primitive gut forms a tube, the foregut and hindgut, respectively. The middle part, the midgut, remains temporally connected to the yolk sac by means of the vitelline duct.

=== Foregut ===
The foregut gives rise to the esophagus, the trachea, lung buds, the stomach, and the duodenum proximal to the entrance of the bile duct. In addition, the liver, pancreas, and biliary apparatus develop as outgrowths of the endodermal epithelium of the upper part of the duodenum. Since the upper part of the foregut is divided by the tracheoesophageal septum into the esophagus posteriorly and the trachea and lung buds anteriorly, deviation of the septum may result in abnormal openings between the trachea and esophagus. The epithelial liver cords and biliary system growing out into the septum transversum differentiate into parenchyma. Hematopoietic cells (present in the liver in greater numbers before birth than afterward), Kupffer cells, and connective tissue cells originate in the mesoderm. The pancreas develops from a ventral bud and a dorsal bud that later fuse to form the definitive pancreas. Sometimes, the two parts surround the duodenum (annular pancreas), causing constriction of the gut.

=== Midgut ===
The midgut forms the primary intestinal loop, from which originates the distal duodenum to the entrance of the bile duct. The loop continues to the junction of the proximal two-thirds of the transverse colon with the distal third. At its apex, the primary loop remains temporarily in open connection with the yolk sac through the vitelline duct. During the sixth week, the loop grows so rapidly that it protrudes into the umbilical cord (physiological herniation). In the 10th week, it returns into the abdominal cavity. While these processes are occurring, the midgut loop rotates 270° counterclockwise. Common abnormalities at this stage of development include remnants of the vitelline duct, failure of the midgut to return to the abdominal cavity, malrotation, stenosis, and duplication of parts.

=== Hindgut ===
The hindgut gives rise to the region from the distal third of the transverse colon to the upper part of the anal canal. The distal part of the anal canal originates from the ectoderm. The hindgut enters the posterior region of the cloaca (future anorectal canal), and the allantois enters the anterior region (future urogenital sinus). The urorectal septum divides the two regions and breakdown of the cloacal membrane covering this area provides communication to the exterior for the anus and urogenital sinus. The upper part of the anal canal is derived from endoderm of the hindgut. The lower part (one-third) is derived from ectoderm around the proctodeum. Ectoderm, in the region of the proctodeum on the surface of part of the cloaca, proliferates and invaginates to create the anal pit. Subsequently, degeneration of the cloacal membrane establishes continuity between the upper and lower parts of the anal canal. Abnormalities in the size of the posterior region of the cloaca shift the entrance of the anus anteriorly, causing rectovaginal and rectourethral fistulas and atresias.

=== Molecular regulation ===
Regional specification of the gut tube into different components occurs during the time that the lateral body folds are bringing the two sides of the tube together. Different regions of the gut tube are initiated by retinoic acid (RA) from the pharynx to the colon. This RA causes transcription factors to be expressed in different regions of the gut tube. Thus, SOX2 specifies the esophagus and stomach; PDX1 specifies the duodenum; CDXC specifies the small intestine; CDXA specifies the large intestine and rectum.

The differentiation of the gut and its derivatives depends upon reciprocal interactions between the gut endoderm (epithelium) and its surrounding mesoderm (an epithelial-mesenchymal interaction). Hox genes in the mesoderm are induced by SHH secreted by gut endoderm and regulate the craniocaudal organization of the gut and its derivatives. Once the mesoderm is specified by this code, it instructs the endoderm to form components of the mid- and hindgut regions, such as the small intestine, caecum, colon, and cloaca.

== Mesentery ==
Portions of the gut tube and its derivatives are suspended from the dorsal and ventral body wall by mesenteries, double layers of peritoneum that enclose an organ and connect it to the body wall. Such organs are called intraperitoneal, whereas organs that lie against the posterior body wall and are covered by peritoneum on their anterior surface only are considered retroperitoneal. So, mesenteries are double layers of peritoneum that pass from one organ to another or from an organ to the body wall as a peritoneal ligament. Mesenteries provide pathways for vessels, nerves, and lymphatic structures to and from abdominal viscera.

Initially the foregut, midgut, and hindgut are in extensive contact with the mesenchyme of the posterior abdominal wall. By the fifth week, the connecting tissue bridge has narrowed, and the caudal part of the foregut, the midgut, and a major part of the hindgut are suspended from the abdominal wall by the dorsal mesentery, which extends from the lower end of the esophagus to the cloacal region of the hindgut. In the region of the stomach, it forms the dorsal mesogastrium or greater omentum. In the region of the duodenum, it forms the dorsal mesoduodenum; and in the region of the colon, it forms the dorsal mesocolon. Dorsal mesentery, of the jejunal and ileal loops, forms the mesentery proper.

The ventral mesentery, located in the region of the terminal part of the esophagus, the stomach and the upper part of the duodenum, is derived from the septum transversum. Growth of the liver into the mesenchyme of the septum transversum divides the ventral mesentery into the lesser omentum, extending from the lower portion of the esophagus, the stomach, and the upper portion of the duodenum to the liver and the falciform ligament, extending from the liver to the ventral body wall.

== See also ==
- Embryology
