= Pediatric urology =

Surgical subspecialty of medicine

Pediatric urology is a surgical subspecialty of medicine dealing with the disorders of children's genitourinary systems. Pediatric urologists provide care for both boys and girls ranging from birth to early adult age. The most common problems are those involving disorders of urination, reproductive organs and testes.

== Focus areas ==
Some of the problems they deal with are:

- Bladder control problems such as bedwetting and daytime urinary incontinence
- Undescended testes (cryptorchidism)
- Hypospadias
- Epispadias
- Urolithiasis (bladder and kidney stones)
- Chordee and other minor malformations of the penis
- Phimosis
- Urinary obstruction and vesicoureteral reflux
- Neurogenic bladder (e.g., associated with spina bifida)
- Antenatal hydronephrosis
- Tumors and cancers of the kidneys
- Repair of genitourinary trauma
- Genitourinary malformations and birth defects
  - Prune belly syndrome
  - Cloacal exstrophy, bladder exstrophy, and epispadias
  - Ambiguous genitalia and intersex conditions

== Pediatric urologists ==
In North America, most pediatric urologists are associated with children's hospitals. Training for board certification in pediatric urology typically consists of a surgery internship as part of a urology residency followed by subspecialty training in pediatric urology at a major children's hospital. In India, Pediatric Urology is practiced by Pediatric Surgeons with a special interest/ training in pediatric urology as well as by adult urologists who get trained in Pediatric Urology.

== See also ==
- Urology
