= Bifid penis =

Medical situation

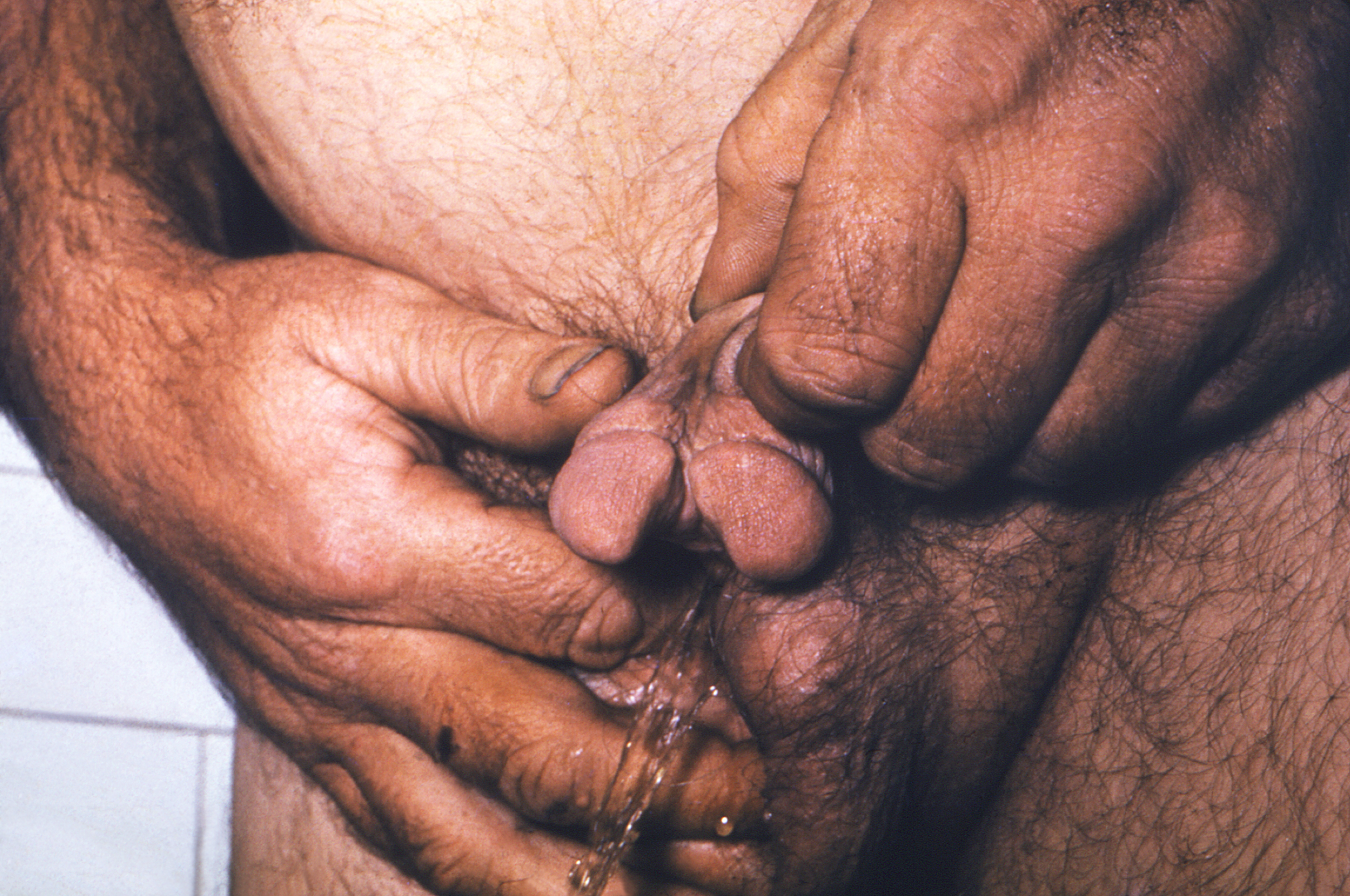
- Man showing signs of hypospadias, including a bifid penis

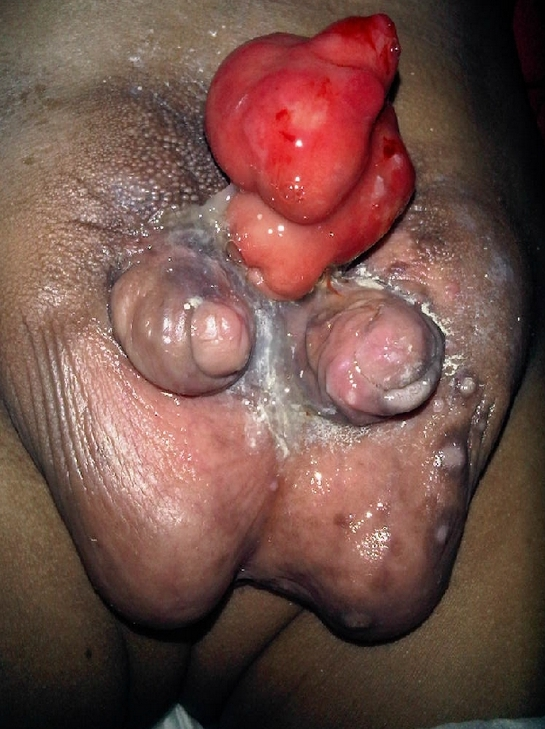
Completely separated bifid penis, with signs of cloacal exstrophy.

A bifid penis is a rare congenital defect involving a penis that is split or duplicated into two penises. It can be considered a form of diphallia. Based on the presence of one or two corpora cavernosa, diphallia is classified into two major groups: bifid penis (in which only one corpora cavernosa is present, but split) or true diphallia (in which a duplicate, secondary corpora cavernosa is present). A bifid penis may be partially split or fully split down the entire length of the penis.

== In Animals ==
Many species of male marsupials have a naturally bifurcated penis, with left and right prongs that they insert into multiple vaginal canals simultaneously.

== See also ==
- Diphallia
- Caudal duplication
- Hypospadias
- Epispadias
- Bladder exstrophy
- Cloacal exstrophy
- Meatotomy
- Penile subincision
