= John Gearhart =

American professor in urology

- Born: 1949 (age 76–77); Lexington, Kentucky
- Education: Morehead State University; University of Louisville School of Medicine
- Medical career
- Profession: Surgeon
- Field: Urology, paediatrics
- Institutions: St. Mary's Medical Center; Johns Hopkins School of Medicine

John Phillip Gearhart (born 1949) is an American professor in paediatrics and urology at the Johns Hopkins School of Medicine. He is known for his work in treating children born with genitourinary tract deformities, including bladder exstrophy and epispadias.

== Early life and education ==
John Gearhart' was born in 1949 in Lexington, Kentucky. He earned a bachelor's degree in biology in 1971 from Morehead State University and his MD in 1975 from the University of Louisville School of Medicine.

== Career ==
Gearhart completed his internship at the Medical College of Georgia. There, he also did two residencies; a general surgery post that ended in 1977 and then a place in urology completed in 1980. He subsequently received a one-year fellowship in paediatric urology at Alder Hey Children's Hospital, in Liverpool, England. For two years he worked as a urologist at St. Mary's Medical Center, Huntington, back in the US. In 1985 he joined the Johns Hopkins School of Medicine as associate professor of paediatric urology, having completed a two-year fellowship there in the same field. In 1991, he was appointed director of paediatric urology at the Johns Hopkins School of Medicine. Four years later he was appointed professor of paediatric urology at Johns Hopkins, where he treats children born with genitourinary tract deformities, including bladder exstrophy and epispadias.

== Other roles ==
Gearhart co-founded the Society of Reconstructive Genitourinary Surgeons.

== Awards and honours ==
Gearhart was awarded a fellowship of the Royal College of Surgeons of Edinburgh in 2008.

== Selected publications ==
=== Articles ===
- Gearhart, John P. (June 2001). "Complete repair of bladder exstrophy in the newborn: complications and management". The Journal of Urology. 165 (6 Pt 2): 2431–2433. doi:10.1016/S0022-5347(05)66222-2. ISSN 0022-5347. PMID 11371948.
- Maxon, Victoria; Haffar, Ahmad; Michel, Chloe A.; Hirsch, Alexander M.; Robey, Catherine; Heap, David; Galansky, Logan; Gearhart, John; Di Carlo, Heather; Crigger, Chad B. (October 2024). "A Rocky Road: Bladder Stones in the Augmented Exstrophy-Epispadias Complex Patient". Urology. 192: 100–104. doi:10.1016/j.urology.2024.07.001. ISSN 1527-9995. PMID 38986957. (Co-author)
- Gearhart, John P.; Jeffs, Robert D. (August 1989). "Bladder exstrophy: increase in capacity following epispadias repair". The Journal of Urology. 142 (2 Pt 2): 525–526, discussion 542–543. doi:10.1016/s0022-5347(17)38804-3. ISSN 0022-5347. PMID 2746772. (Co-author)
- Peters, Craig A.; Gearhart, John P.; Jeffs, Robert D. (1988). "Epispadias and incontinence: The challenge of the small bladder". Journal of Urology. 140 (5 PART II): 1199–1201. doi:10.1016/s0022-5347(17)42001-5. ISSN 0022-5347. PMID 3184295.

=== Books ===
- Pediatric Urology. Springer. 2003. ISBN 978-1-59259-421-4.
