= Double penis =

"Two penises" or "double penis" can refer to:

- Bifid penis, either a normal anatomical feature of some species, or a developmental abnormality in species that normally have a single penis
- Diphallia, a developmental abnormality in species that normally have a single penis
- Genital bisection, a destructive body modification of the penis
