= Supernumerary body part =

Growth of an additional part of the body and a deviation from the body plan

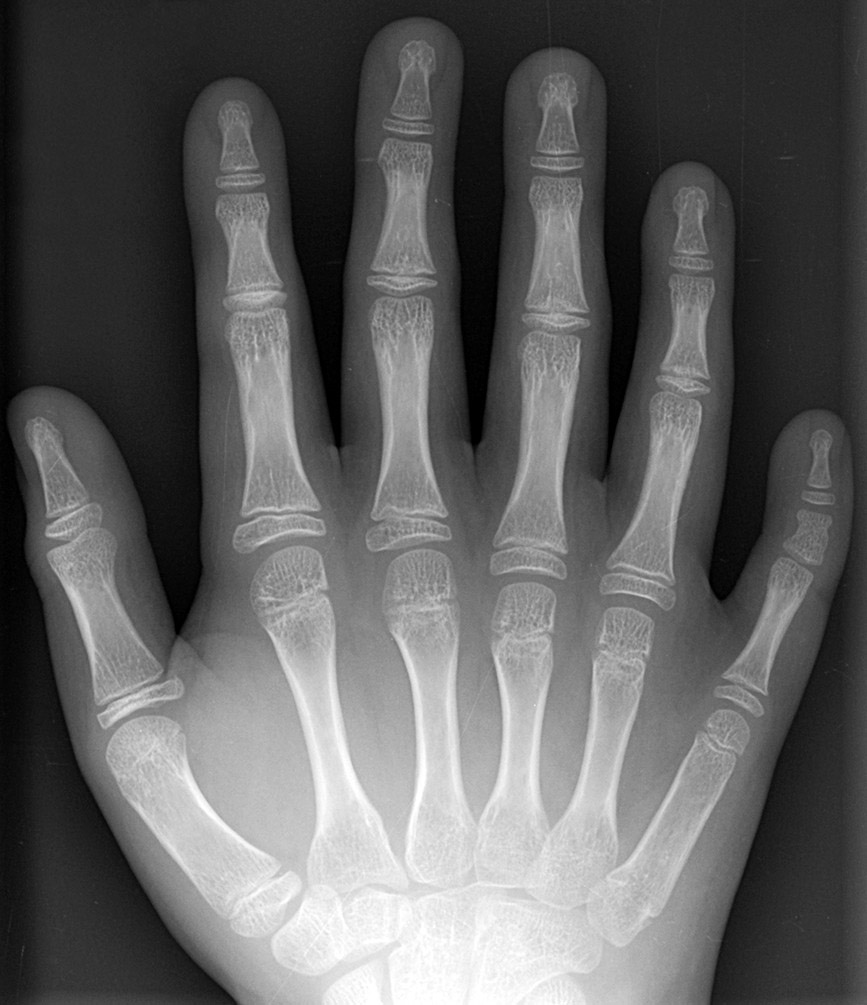
An X-ray of a hand with a supernumerary digit (polydactyly)

Supernumerary body parts are most commonly a congenital disorder involving the growth of an additional part of the body and a deviation from the body plan. Body parts may be easily visible or hidden away, such as internal organs.

Many additional body parts form by the same process as conjoined twins: the zygote begins to split but fails to completely separate. This condition may also be a symptom of repeated occurrences of continuous inbreeding in a genetic line.

== Specific types of occurrence ==
Specific types of additional body parts include:

- Accessory breast – one or more additional breasts
- Accessory spleen – one or more additional spleens
- Cervical rib – an additional rib
- Diphallia – having two penes/penises
- Hyperdontia – additional teeth
- Pelvic digit – a bony growth in the soft tissue of the pelvic region
- Polycephaly – an extra head
- Polydactyly – additional fingers or toes
- Polymelia – an extra arm or leg
- Polyorchidism – having three or more testicles
- Supernumerary bones – these additional bones are fairly common, particularly in the feet, and are frequently mistaken for fractures on x-rays.
- Supernumerary kidney – a third kidney
- Supernumerary musculature – presence of extra muscles such as additional heads of the biceps brachii, or coracobrachialis muscle variants
- Supernumerary nipples – an additional nipple
- Supernumerary phantom limbs – where the brain acts as though a limb were there, but it is not
- Syndactyly – webbing between the fingers or toes
- Uterus didelphys – two vaginal canals and/or uteri

== Related conditions and concepts ==
Vestigial structures are anatomical structures of organisms in a species which are considered to have lost much or all of their original function through evolution. These body parts can be classed as additional to the required functioning of the body. In human anatomy, the vermiform appendix is sometimes classed as a vestigial remnant.

Prosthesis is an artificial extension that replaces a body part, and cybernetics is the study of computer technology in relation to organisms, which can include replacement or additional body parts.

Body integrity identity disorder (BIID) is a psychiatric disorder in which a person thinks that they have one or more additional limbs than they should, despite having two arms and two legs. People with this condition often wish to amputate what they see as additional body parts.

A phantom limb is the sensation that a missing limb is still attached to the body. This is almost universal in amputees in the first month following an amputation.

A supernumerary phantom limb is the sensation of having an extra limb or body part despite no such limb actually existing. It is an uncommon syndrome, usually due to some kind of brain injuries in the somatosensory cortex or in some parts of the right hemisphere of the brain, usually due to a stroke in the brain.

A chimera is an animal or plant that has two or more different populations of genetically distinct cells that originated in different zygotes that have merged. Anatomical structures are typically mixed depending on which cells are prevalent in different body parts. For example, plants can have two different types of flowers.

A mosaic is a genetic anomaly similar in nature and effects to a chimera: genetically different populations of cells within one organism, originated from some propagated mutation of a single cell rather than from outside sources.

== Mythology ==
In Hindu mythology, additional limbs and heads are considered a sign of power.

In Greek mythology, Artemis, the goddess of fertility, was sometimes represented as having numerous breasts. This was particularly notable in the cult of Artemis (Diana) celebrated in the ancient city of Ephesus, in modern Turkey.

In Japanese mythology, the god of the sea and storms, Susanoo, is sometimes depicted as having a third arm.

In Hungarian mythology, having six fingers on a hand (polydactyly) is held to be the sign of innate supernatural power (see táltos).

In Christian mythology, Goliath has brothers who have six fingers and six toes.

== See also ==
- Triple deities
- Polydactyl cat
- List of anatomical variations
- Caudal duplication
