= Corpus =

Corpus (pl. corpora) is Latin for 'body'. It may refer to:

== Linguistics ==
- Text corpus, in linguistics, a large and structured set of texts
- Speech corpus, in linguistics, a large set of speech audio files
- Corpus linguistics, a branch of linguistics

== Music ==
- Corpus Delicti (band), a French band also known simply as Corpus
- Corpus (album), by Sebastian Santa Maria

== Medicine ==
- Corpus callosum, a structure in the brain
- Corpus cavernosum (disambiguation), a pair of structures in human genitals
- Corpus luteum, a temporary endocrine structure in mammals
- Corpus gastricum, the Latin term referring to the body of the stomach
- Corpus alienum, a foreign object originating outside the body
- Corpus albicans
- Corpora amylacea
- Corpora arenacea

== Surname ==
- Maryann Corpus-Mañalac (born 1966), Filipino associate justice of the Sandiganbayan
- Victor Corpus (1944–2024), Filipino military officer and public official

== Other uses ==
=== Financial and commercial ===
- Enron Corpus, a database of emails from the disgraced American energy company Enron

=== Religious ===
- Corpus (Bernini), a 1650 sculpture of Christ by Gian Lorenzo Bernini
- Corpus, the figure of Christ on a crucifix
- CORPUS, a dissident Catholic organisation

=== Other ===
- Corpus (museum), a human body themed museum in the Netherlands
- Corpus Clock, a large sculptural clock
- Corpus (dance troupe), a Canadian dance troupe
- Corpus (typography), another name for long primer-size type
- Corpus, the colloquial term mostly used for Corpus Christi, Texas
- The Corpus, a faction in the online game Warframe, organized as a cult that worships profit

== See also ==
- Habeas corpus, a legal mechanism to end detention of a suspect
- Corpus delicti, a legal term meaning "body of the crime"
- Corpus Christi (disambiguation)
- Corpus separatum (disambiguation), a form of political administration used in international conflict resolution
- Corps (disambiguation)
- Body (disambiguation)
