= Diphallia =

Genital medical condition

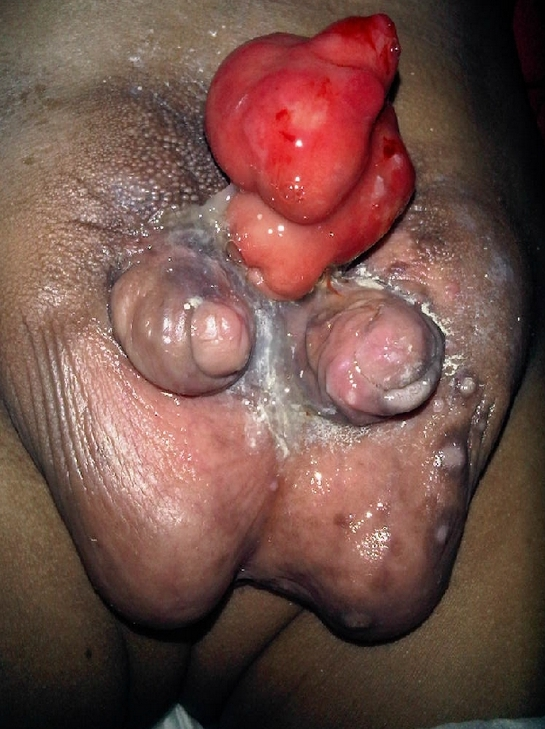
- The external male genitalia of a prepubescent male with a form of bifid diphallia

Diphallia, penile duplication (PD), diphallic terata, or diphallasparatus is an extremely rare developmental abnormality in which a male is born with two penises. The first reported case was by Johannes Jacob Wecker in 1609. Its occurrence is 1 in 5.5 million newborn.

When diphallia is present, it is usually accompanied by renal, vertebral, hindgut, anorectal or other congenital anomalies. There is also a higher risk of spina bifida. Infants born with diphallia and its related conditions have a higher death rate from various infections associated with their more complex renal or colorectal systems.

It is generally believed diphallia occurs in the fetus between the 23rd and 25th days of gestation when an injury, chemical stress, or malfunctioning homeobox genes hamper proper function of the caudal cell mass of the fetal mesoderm as the urogenital sinus separates from the genital tubercle and rectum to form the penis.

The first case was reported by Wecker in Bologna, Italy, in 1609, and since then, about one hundred cases have been reported. This condition has existed in humans since ancient times. The two external genitalia may vary in size and shape, either lying beside each other in a sagittal plane or one above the other in a frontal plane.

According to Schneider classification in 1928, double penis is classified into three groups: (a) glans diphallia, (b) bifid diphallia and (c) complete diphallia or double penis. According to Vilanora and Raventos, in 1954, a fourth group called pseudodiphallia was added.

The current widely accepted classification, introduced by Aleem in 1972, classifies double penis into two groups: true diphallia and bifid phallus. True diphallia is caused by cleavage of pubic tubercle; bifid phallus is caused by separation of pubic tubercle. Each of these two groups is further subdivided into partial or complete. True diphallia is where each phallus has two corpora cavernosa and a single corpus spongiosum containing a urethra. True diphallia can be either complete with both penises similar in size, or partial when one of the phallia is smaller in size or immature, though structurally same as the larger phallus. In bifid phallus, each phallus has only one corpus cavernosum and one corpus spongiosum containing a urethra. Separation of penises down to the base of the penile shaft is complete bifid, whereas to glans is partial bifid. For complete bifid phallus associated with anomalies, the anterior urethra is absent from each penis and the prostatic urethra is situated in the skin between the two penises. In partial bifid phallus, the duplication of urethra, corpora cavernosa and corpus spongiosum in one penis is incomplete, and there is only a corpus cavernosum and a spongiosum surrounding the functioning urethra in the other penis.

== Notable clinical cases ==
Diphallia is usually accompanied by systemic anomalies; their extent varies, ranging from no associated anomaly to multiple anomalies including urogenital, gastrointestinal and musculoskeletal systems. Penile duplication also varies from a single penis with double glans to complete double penises. The meatus may be normal at tip of glans, hypospadiac, or epispadiac; the scrotum may be normal or bifid. True diphallia is more likely accompanied with associated anomalies and malformations compared with bifid phallus. Infants born with diphallia have higher death rate due to infections associated with anomalies.

=== Complete true diphallia with associated anomalies ===
A two-day-old male newborn, associated with complex genitourinary and ano-rectal malformation. He had imperforated anus, hypospadias, bifid scrotum, meatuses on both glandes, two bladders and two colons, and had normal testes, kidneys and ureters.

=== Partial true diphallia or pseudodiphallia, without associated anomalies ===
Partial true diphallia corresponds to pseudodiphallia. Pseudodiphallia is formed from erectile tissue only, undifferentiated and non-functional. It is independent of the normal penis and can be removed surgically without problem. This rare case was reported, based on the age of the 83-year-old man when diphallia was only detected then when he was hospitalised, and also because of the absence of other anatomical malformations. The small, immature and nonfunctional penis protruded on one side of the large, normal penis. The secondary penis had glans but without urinary meatus.

=== Complete bifid diphallia with associated anomalies ===
A 12-year-old boy, associated with bifid scrotum, epispadia and pubic symphysis diastasis. He had two separate penises, similar in size and shape, each penis had an epispadia urethral meatus. He had bifid scrotum, one testicle on each side of the scrotum. A bowel loop-like structure was over the pubis region. This structure had no communication with any other structures. He had a single normal bladder and ureter.

=== Partial bifid diphallia without associated anomalies ===
A 15-year-old boy, apart from having two penises, had normal external genitalia. His two testicles were within normal scrotum and normally positioned. He had two unequal sized glans at tip of a thick penile shaft, and only urinated through the larger glans. He had a patent anus, one bladder, one normal urethra, normal gastrointestinal and genitourinary systems.

Complete diphallia with associated anomalies

A 14-year-old boy, presented with continuous urinary incontinence since birth, was found to have complete penile duplication: a primary phallus of normal size with dorsal urethral meatus (epispadias) and a hypoplastic secondary phallus with urethral atresia. Both testes were descended in a normal scrotum. Associated anomalies included congenital fusion of L3–L4 vertebrae, mild lumbar scoliosis, high-pressure neurogenic bladder with low compliance, left grade II vesicoureteral reflux, severe cortical loss in the right kidney, and partial cortical loss in the left kidney. Initial management with clean intermittent catheterization and oral oxybutynin failed to normalize bladder pressures; intradetrusor onabotulinumtoxinA (300 U) injection reduced leakage episodes. Renal function preservation was prioritized before any reconstructive surgery.

== Cause ==
The cause of diphallia is unknown. Its associated anomalies vary largely, so it is impossible to give a simple, single explanation of its cause. It is thought to occur due to duplication of the cloacal membrane in early embryonic development stages in the fetus, between the third and sixth week of gestation, as normal development of cloacal folds in the fetus is typically completed between these times.

Normal development of the penis occurs with the fusion of cloacal tubercles at the anterior end of the urogenital sinus. Mesenchyme migrates around the cloacal membrane, proliferates and expands around the cloacal plate, forming a pair of cloacal folds that fuse to form the genital tubercle which develops into the penis. If the cloacal membrane is doubled, mesenchyme will migrate and surround both cloacal membranes, leading to the formation of two pairs of cloacal folds around two cloacal membranes, resulting in formation of two genital tubercles and thus two penises. The concept of caudal duplication syndrome is used to explain the symptoms of diphallia with associated complex anomalies in the lower abdomen and urinary tract. Further, as mesenchyme migrates from more than one area, failure in migration and in the fusion of mesoderm results in the formation of two genital tubercles and double penises, as well as producing associated anomalies such as double bladders, double urethra, double colons and imperforated anus. Failure in proper fusion of urethral folds results in hypospadias. Failure in mesoderm cell migration results in epispadia.

Diphallia is a rare abnormal external genitalia. The cause is uncertain, but most scientists agree that diphallia is a defect of the genital tubercle, and occurs at about week three of gestation, when the caudal cell mass of the mesoderm is affected by various external environmental factors including drugs, infections and malfunctioning homeobox genes.

== Treatment ==
Treatment is a case-by-case analysis taking into account considerations for medical and ethical reasons, and involves surgical excision of the non-functioning penis.

== See also ==
- Bifid penis
- Penile agenesis
- Polyorchidism
- Supernumerary body part
- Uterus didelphys
- Vaginal septum

== Notes ==
- A scientific paper of triphallia (three penises) in a marine snail was reported.(Castillo, Viviana M; Brown, Donald I (2012). "One Case of Triphallia in the Marine Snail Echinolittorina peruviana (Caenogastropoda: Littorinidae)". International Journal of Morphology. 30 (3): 791–796. doi:10.4067/S0717-95022012000300003.)
- In 2021, the first known case of a human with triphallia was recorded in Iraq.("Triphallia: First Human Case of Baby Born With Three Male Genitalia Reported". 3 April 2021.)
