= Corpuz =

Corpuz is the Filipino equivalent of the Spanish and Latin Corpus. Notable people with the surname include:

- Jackson Corpuz (born 1989), Filipino basketball player
- Niña Corpuz (born 1977), Filipino journalist
- Onofre Corpuz (1926–2013), Filipino academic, economist, and historian
- Teddy Corpuz (born 1980), Filipino singer, television presenter, actor, and comedian
- Victoria Tauli-Corpuz (born 1952), Filipino indigenous activist
