= Eleventh finger =

Eleventh finger may refer to:

- Polydactyly, a congenital anomaly in humans having supernumerary fingers or toes
- Pelvic digit, a congenital anomaly in humans, in which bone tissue develops in the soft tissue near the pelvis
