= Myrtle Corbin =

American sideshow performer (1868–1928)

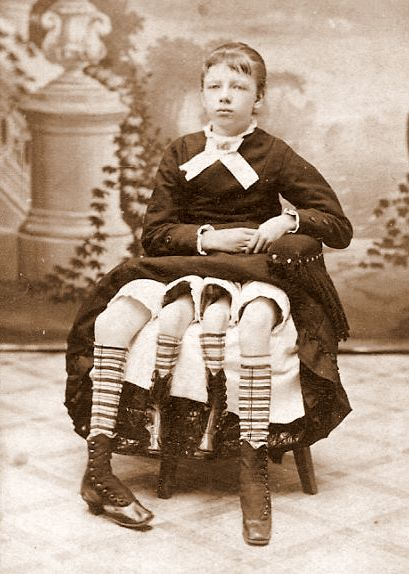
- Corbin in 1882
- Born: Josephine Myrtle Corbin; May 12, 1868; Lincoln County, Tennessee, U.S.
- Died: May 6, 1928 (aged 59); Cleburne, Texas, U.S.
- Other name: The four-legged woman
- Height: 5 ft (1.5 m)
- Spouse: James Clinton Bicknell (m. 1886)
- Children: 5

Josephine Myrtle Corbin (May 12, 1868 – May 6, 1928) was an American sideshow performer born as a dipygus. This referred to the fact that she had two separate pelvises side by side from the waist down, as a result of her body axis splitting as it developed. Each of her smaller inner legs was paired with one of her outer legs. She was said to be able to move her inner legs, but they were too weak for walking.

== Early life and family ==
Corbin was born in Lincoln County, Tennessee. Corbin's parents were William H. Corbin, aged 25 at the time of his daughter's birth, and Nancy Corbin (née Sullins), aged 34. Both parents were described by physicians who examined the infant shortly after her birth as being very similar in appearance, "both having auburn hair, blue eyes, and very fair complexion"; in fact, they looked so similar that the physicians felt compelled to point out that they were not "blood kin". The Corbins had four children in total, including a child from Nancy's first marriage.

Myrtle's birth was not marked by anything "peculiar about the labour or delivery" according to her mother. Doctors who examined the child shortly after her birth noted that a breech presentation "would have proved fatal to the infant, and possibly to the mother." Corbin soon showed herself to be a strong child, weighing 10 lb (4.5 kg) three weeks after the birth, and it was reported in a journal published later that year that she "nurses healthily" and was "thriving well".

== Medical condition ==
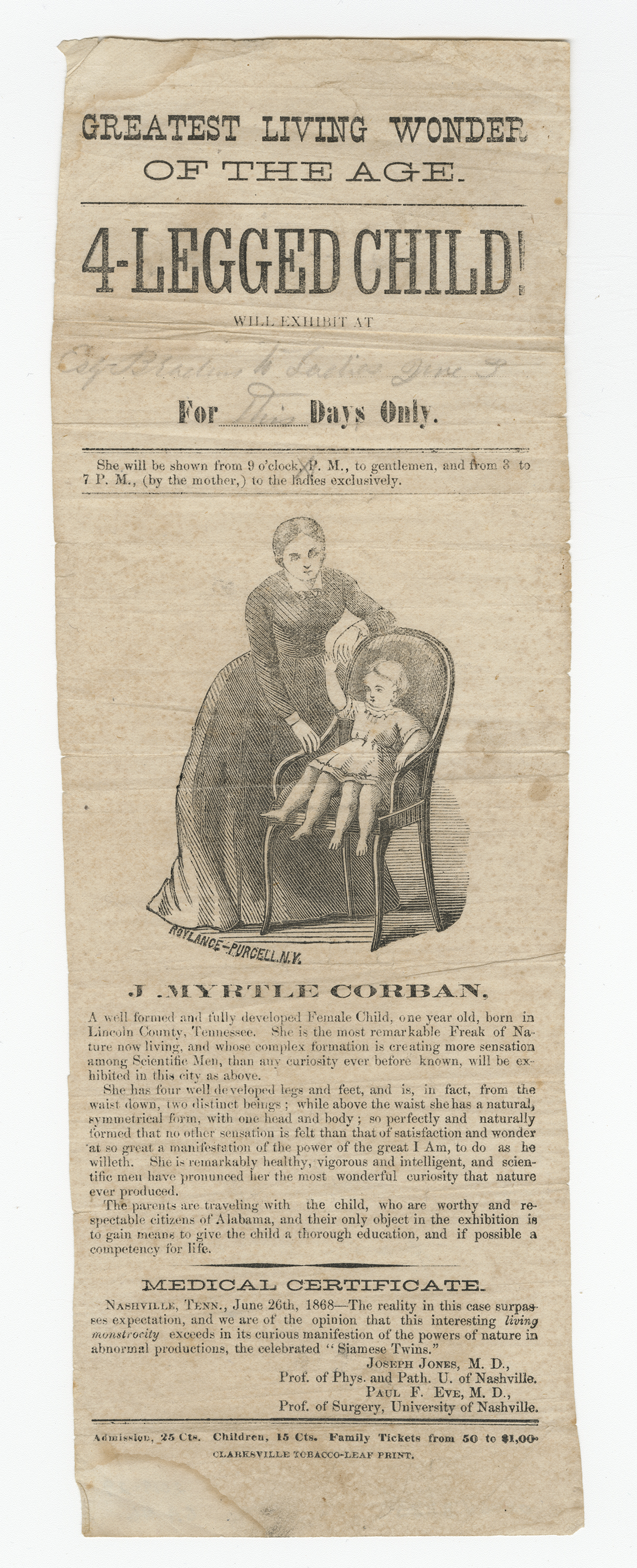
Promotional broadside advertising Myrtle Corbin as the "Greatest Living Wonder of the Age" and the "4-Legged Child", including an illustration of Corbin with her mother, a description of her condition, exhibition details, and a medical certificate, 1868.

Corbin was born with dipygus, a rare congenital condition in which the lower body is partially duplicated during embryonic development. From the waist down, she had two separate pelvises and four legs. Her two outer legs were fully developed, while the smaller inner legs could be moved but were too weak to support walking.

Medical examinations found that the duplication extended internally. Corbin had two sets of external genitalia and two reproductive tracts, each with its own uterus.

Contemporary physicians described Corbin as being in good health despite her unusual anatomy. Lewis Whaley, who had known Corbin since childhood, described her as "about five feet high", with "fair skin, blue eyes, and curly hair". He observed that "a stranger, to see her in company, would only think her unusually broad across her hips", adding that he did not fully appreciate "the perfect dual development of both external and internal genital organs" until treating her during a pregnancy. Another physician characterized her as "a refined woman, of some musical taste."

Corbin's condition attracted considerable medical interest and was described in medical journals, textbooks, and encyclopedias in the United States and Europe. Her first documented pregnancy, in 1887, prompted further medical examination. Physicians determined that the pregnancy was developing in her left uterus, and the case was subsequently described in several medical journals.

According to Whaley, upon being told that she was pregnant, she replied in disbelief, saying "If it had been in my right side I would come nearer believing you are correct." From this comment, physicians determined that Corbin preferred intercourse in the right side, and this fact was commented upon in several subsequent reports.

Nineteenth-century physicians classified Corbin's condition using several technical terms that reflected the medical terminology of the period. She was variously described as a "dipygus dibrachius tetrapus", as having "'posterior dichotomy,' subvariety schizorachis", and as a "female, belonging to the monocephalic, ileadelphic class of monsters by fusion."

== Career ==
Corbin entered the sideshow circuit with the moniker "Four-Legged Girl from Texas" when she was 13 years old; one of her first promotional pamphlets described her as being as "gentle of disposition as the summer sunshine and as happy as the day is long." Her popularity in this industry was such that other showmen turned to exhibiting four-legged gaffs (falsified performances). When Corbin herself was no longer performing, there were several phony four-legged women to whom audiences could turn.

== Marriage and children ==
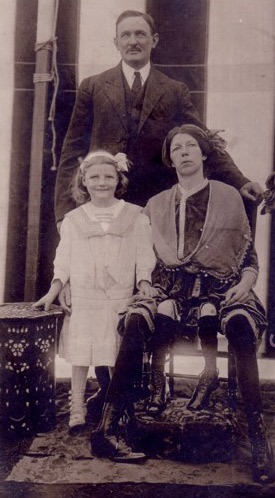
Corbin with her husband and one of her children.

Corbin married James Clinton Bicknell in 1886, when she was 18 years old. The couple remained married for 42 years and had five children, including four daughters and one son.

In the spring of 1887, about a year after their marriage, the 18-year-old Corbin became pregnant for the first time. She sought medical treatment after developing pain in her left side, fever, headache, loss of appetite, persistent vomiting, and missed menstrual periods. Dr. Lewis Whaley of Blountsville, Alabama, was called to examine her and discovered that she was pregnant. Whaley later described the case in the Atlanta Medical and Surgical Journal, bringing renewed medical interest in Corbin during the late 1880s, when she was identified in medical literature as "Mrs. B."

Corbin became gravely ill during the pregnancy. After consulting with colleagues, Whaley performed a therapeutic abortion approximately eight weeks after his initial examination, when she was estimated to be between three and four months pregnant. Corbin made a full recovery, and neither the procedure nor her rare anatomy prevented her from later carrying additional pregnancies to term.

By the end of her childbearing years, Corbin had given birth to five children. Contemporary physicians described her as physically well despite her unusual anatomy. One medical report characterized her as "attractive in face, physically well, and able to attend to all her household duties."

== Death ==
In early 1928, Corbin developed a skin infection on her right leg. When it failed to heal, she sought medical treatment in Cleburne, Texas, where she was diagnosed with erysipelas, a streptococcal skin infection. She died on May 6, 1928, six days before her 60th birthday.

Fearing that her body would be stolen because of medical interest in her rare congenital condition, Corbin's family took extraordinary precautions following her death. Her casket was encased in concrete, and family members kept watch over the grave until the concrete had fully hardened to prevent grave robbers from stealing her remains. Several medical practitioners and private collectors reportedly offered financial compensation for her corpse.

== Cultural references ==
- In 2015 Graywolf Press published Four-Legged Girl by Diane Seuss. The 88 page collection of poems was a finalist for the 2016 Pulitzer Prize for Poetry.
