= Epispadias =

- Epispadias in a male.
- Specialty: Medical genetics, urology
- Complications: Urinary incontinence, Sexual dysfunction
- Frequency: Rare

Epispadias is a birth defect in which the urethra fails to fully develop into a complete tube and structural tissues do not properly fuse at the midline, which results in urine exiting the body from an atypical location. Epispadias occurs in around one in 117,000 newborn boys and one in 484,000 newborn girls.

== Presentation ==
Epispadias in a female.

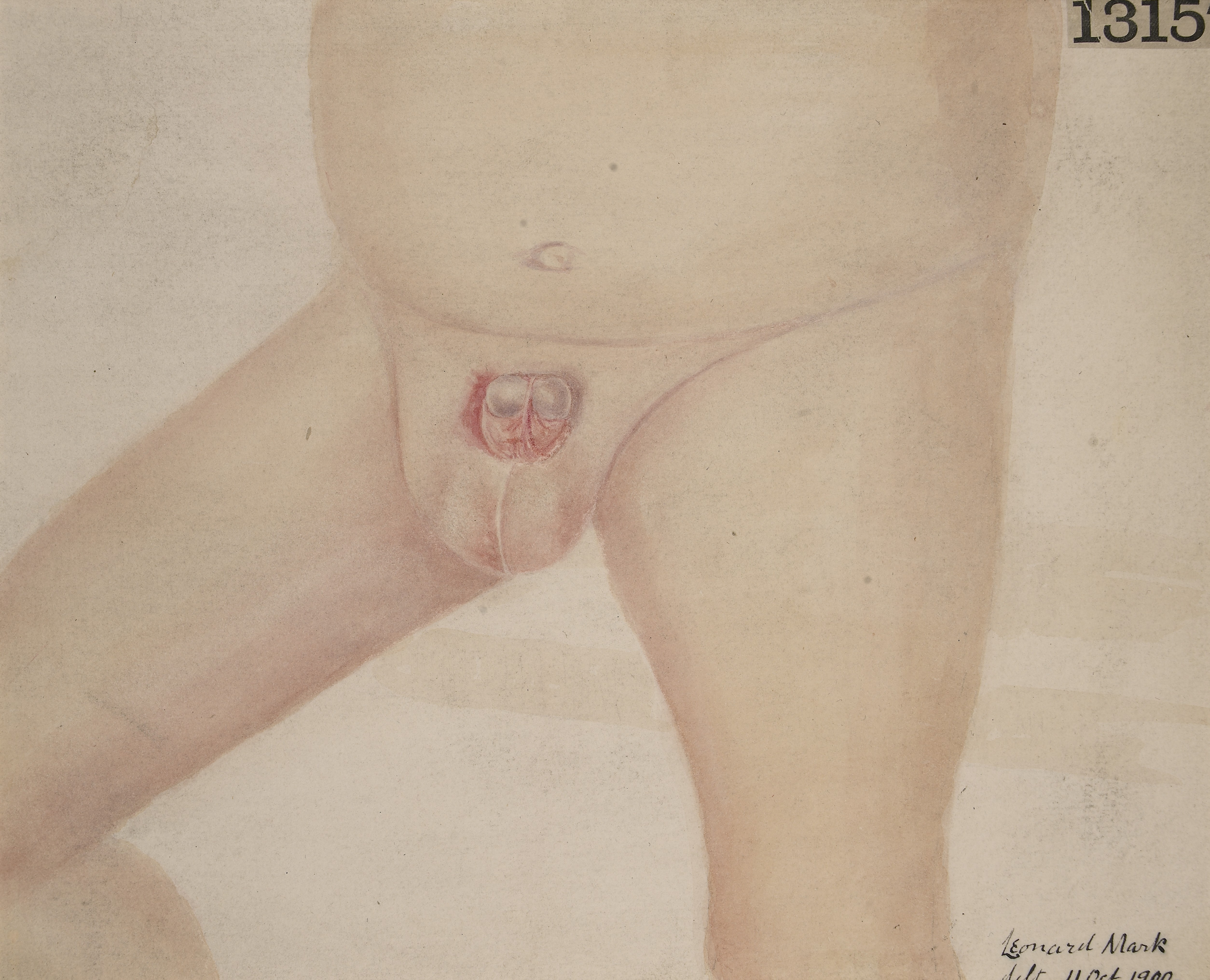
Epispadias in a boy aged 2 years.

=== Males ===
Males may present with the urethra opening on the top or side of the penis instead of the tip. The urethra may also be open along the whole length of the penis. The penis often has an upward curve. The penis is usually short in length, small, flattened, or wide in relation to length. Some cases of epispadias may feature a bifid penis.

=== Females ===
Females may present with abnormal labia, abnormal or absent mons pubis, and patulous urethral meatus. The urethral opening may be located anywhere from the clitoris to the belly. Usually females with epispadias have a bifid clitoris, but it is not always present. A septate uterus, septate vagina, or uterine didelphys may also be present.

== Relationship to other conditions ==
=== The exstrophy spectrum ===
All cases of bladder exstrophy and cloacal exstrophy feature epispadias as part of the broader Bladder Exstrophy-Epispadias-Cloacal Exstrophy Complex (BEEC).

- Epispadias: The mildest form where the urethra fails to close and remains exposed on the top surface of the genitalia.
- Bladder exstrophy: An intermediate form where the bladder is also exposed on the lower abdominal wall, and epispadias is universally present.
- Cloacal exstrophy: The most severe form, featuring defects of bladder and bowel, with epispadias also present. Spinal abnormalities like spina bfida may also be present.

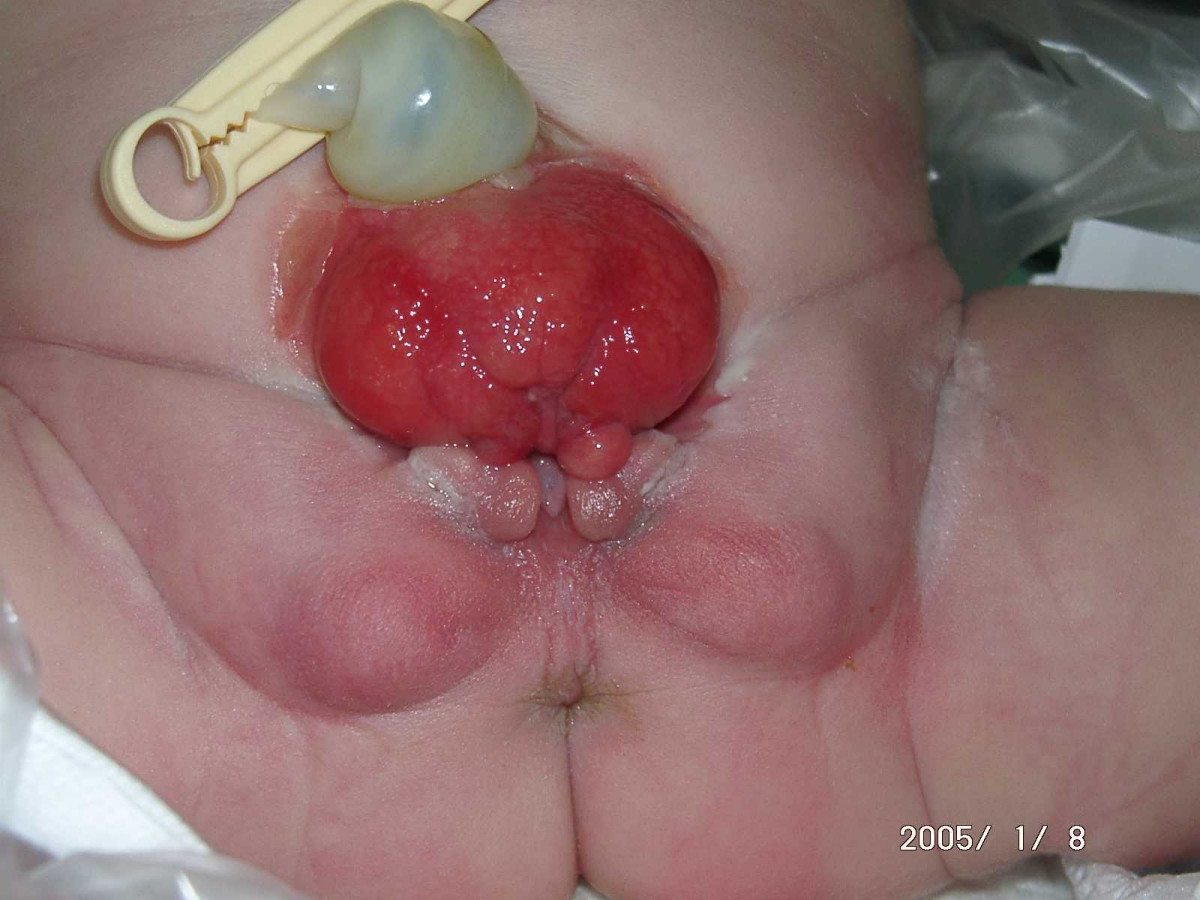
Female baby with classical bladder exstrophy displaying an unfused abdominal wall, exposed bladder, epispadias, and bifid clitoris.

=== Disorders of sex development ===
Epispadias is not a disorder of sex development. Historically many male children on the exstrophy spectrum were given feminizing procedures and assigned female, which associated them with intersex people despite that exstrophy is not an issue of sexual differentiation.

=== Hypospadias ===
Despite the similarity of name, epispadias is not a type of hypospadias, and involves a problem with a different set of embryologic processes.

Unlike hypospadias, where the urethra may be completely developed and tubular but feature an opening positioned abnormally low, epispadias features incomplete development of the urethra and an open urethral plate on the penile dorsum. Hypospadias primarily involves later stages of development, abnormal ventral urethral development, and sex hormones, whereas epispadias is much more closely tied to early cloacal/genital-tubercle positioning and midline development that happens prior to sexual differentiation.

Epispadias more often involves urinary incontinence and other urination difficulties than hypospadias does, as hypospadias does not usually involve primary bladder-neck/sphincter defects while epispadias does.

== Causes ==
Epispadias is an uncommon and partial form of a spectrum of failures of abdominal and pelvic fusion in the first months of embryogenesis known as the Bladder Exstrophy-Epispadias-Cloacal Exstrophy Complex (BEEC). While epispadias is present in all cases of exstrophy it can also, much less frequently, appear in isolation as the least severe form of the complex spectrum. It occurs as a result of defective migration of the genital tubercle primordium to the cloacal membrane, and so malformation of the genital tubercle, at about the 5th week of gestation.

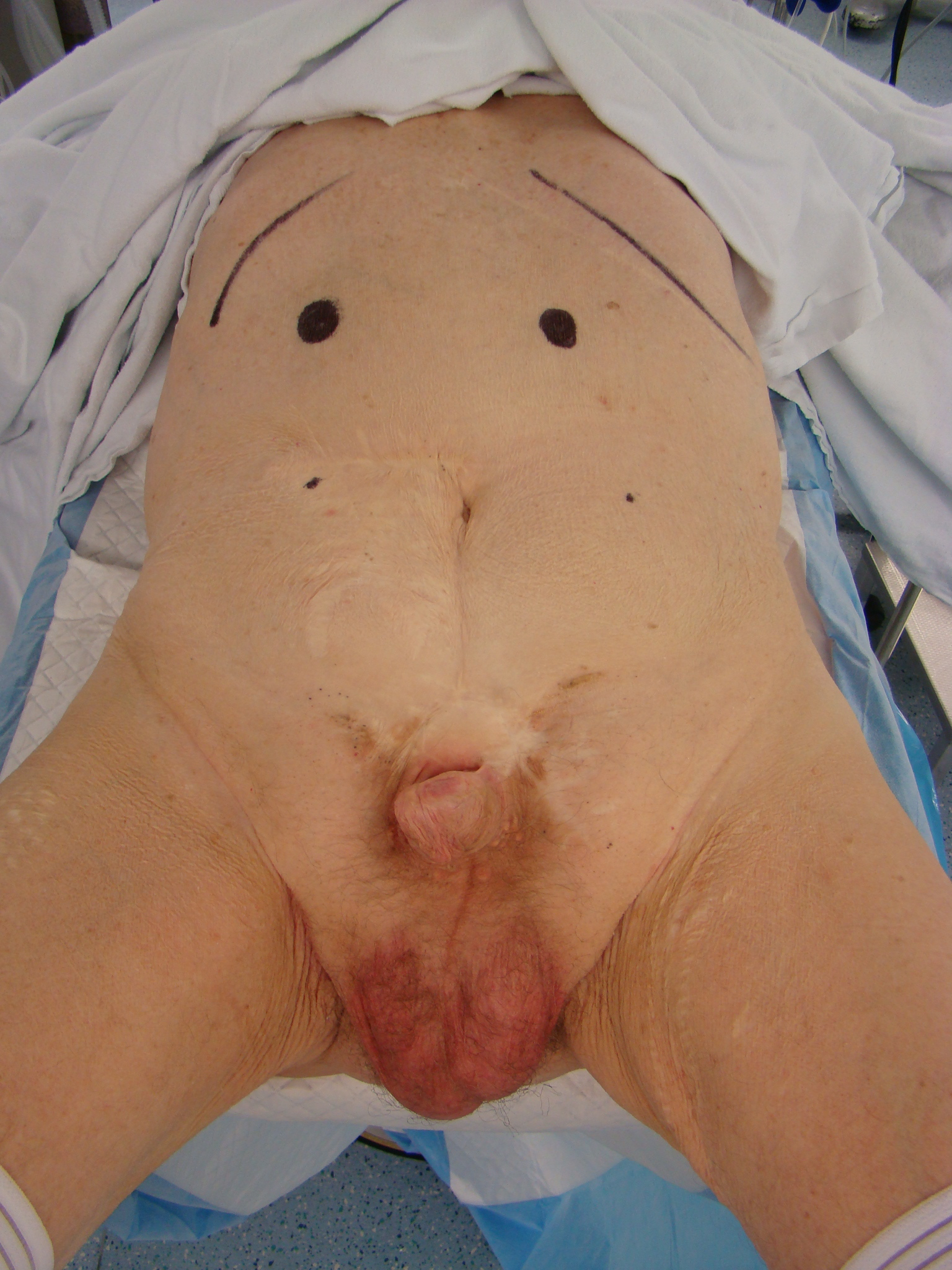
Epispadias and surgically repaired bladder exstrophy in a male.

== Treatment ==
The main treatment for isolated epispadias is a comprehensive surgical repair of the genito-urinary area usually during the first 7 years of life, including reconstruction of the urethra, closure of the penile shaft and mobilisation of the corpora. The most popular and successful technique is known as the modified Cantwell-Ransley approach. In recent decades however increasing success has been achieved with the complete penile disassembly technique despite its association with greater and more serious risk of damage.

== Prognosis ==
Even with successful surgery, patients may have long-term problems with:

- Urinary incontinence, where serious it is usually treated with some form of continent urinary diversion such as the Mitrofanoff
- Depression and psycho-social complications
- Sexual dysfunction

== See also ==
- Bladder exstrophy
- Cloacal exstrophy
- Caudal regression syndrome
- Cloaca (embryology)
- Development of the urinary system
- Urogenital sinus
- Hypospadias
- Cleft lip and cleft palate
- Median plane
