= Caudal duplication =

- Other names: Split notochord syndrome

Caudal duplication (or caudal duplication syndrome) is a rare congenital disorder in which various structures of the caudal region, embryonic cloaca, and neural tube exhibit a spectrum of abnormalities such as duplication and malformations. The exact causes of the condition is unknown, though there are several theories implicating abnormal embryological development as a cause for the condition. Diagnosis is often made during prenatal development of the second trimester through anomaly scans or immediately after birth. However, rare cases of adulthood diagnosis has also been observed. Treatment is often required to correct such abnormalities according to the range of symptoms present, whilst treatment options vary from conservative expectant management to resection of caudal tissue to restore normal function or appearance. As a rare congenital disorder, the prevalence at birth is less than 1 per 100,000 with less than 100 cases reported worldwide.

The term "caudal duplication syndrome" was coined in 1993 to describe caudal abnormalities and conditions. However, there has been recent debate into the appropriateness of the term being "caudal split syndrome" instead of caudal duplication due to the "splitting" nature of the abnormalities, rather than "duplication".

== Signs and symptoms ==
The condition’s symptoms vary greatly due to the diverse spectrum of gastrointestinal (GI), urogenital (genitourinary, GU), spinal, and limb anomalies possible. Common forms include anorectal malformation and duplication of the external genitalia, while less common forms may include incomplete duplication of the lower spine and spinal cord, (diastematomyelia) and partial fusion to complete duplication of the uterus, vagina, colon, and bladder.

Malformations of the spine are indicated to cause varying levels of neurological impairment. Although the level of neurological impairment is dependent upon the severity and type of spinal abnormality, most reported cases of spinal cord duplication exhibit severe neurological impairment, though cases of mild or absent neurological impairment has also been observed.

Though patients often present a diverse variety of symptoms, a case was observed in which a female adult with duplication of the colon, rectum, anus, urinary bladder, urethra, uterus, cervix, vagina, and external genitalia exhibited no detrimental effects. This suggests that rarely seen cases of complete duplication of the urogenital and gastrointestinal tract are often asymptomatic.

As patients often present a multitude of differing symptoms within the caudal region, each patient exhibits a unique, characterised symptom which may or may not be cosmetically or physiologically detrimental to the individual.

Summary of Caudal Duplication Anomalies
Classification	Anomalies and salient clinical features
Gastrointestinal tract anomalies	Duplication of colon, cecum, ani, appendix, and ileum; Agenesis, atresia, cyst, herniation, omphalocele, imperforate anus, and rectal fistula; Meckel’s diverticulum, intestinal malrotation, and situs inversus
Genitourinary tract anomalies	Duplication of external and internal genitalia, vagina, cervix, bladder, urethra, uterus, ureter, scrotum, and testis; Bilateral exstrophy of bladder, cryptorchidism, malrotation, agenesis of kidney, rectourethral fistula, urinary disturbances including incontinence and retention
Spinal anomalies (includes lower limb anomalies)	Duplication of lumbar and thoracic vertebrae, sacrum, coccyx, ilium, and spinal cord; Hemivertebra, sacral agenesis, myelomeningocele, diplomyelia, spina bifida, and diastematomyelia; Third leg from meningocele

== Causes ==
The exact cause of the condition is unknown. Although various theories indicate incomplete separation of monozygotic twins as an etiological factor, abnormal adherence between the ectoderm and endoderm during gastrulation, polytopic primary developmental field defects, somatic and germ line mutations in developmental genes, and damage to the caudal cell mass and posterior gut have also been linked to cause structural anomalies in the caudal region.

It is speculated that the condition is related to the HOX gene, namely HOX10 and HOX11. Normally coding for the mammalian appendicular and axial skeleton, misexpression of the genetic factors could lead to abnormal proliferation of the caudal mesenchyme.

Embryology is suggested to have an intimate association with the development of caudal duplication syndrome. At day 15 after fertilisation, the notochord grows from the primitive knot, in which it invaginates and forms the notochord canal within. Progressively, on day 20, the ventral wall of the notochord dissolves, while communications are formed between the amniotic and yolk sac. One such connection is the Kovalevsky’s canal. From the 23rd to 25th day of gestation, the spinal cord develops except for its distal-most aspect where the notochord and neural tube are joined to form the caudal cell mass. The canal of Kovalevsky crosses the caudal cell mass, while endoderm located anteriorly to the cell mass develops into the hindgut, various insults towards the cell mass and hindgut during the stage of development may lead to the development of caudal anomalies, one of which is caudal duplication syndrome.

The incomplete regression of Kovalevsky’s canal may also lead to formations of fibrous bands joining the hindgut to the spinal canal, possibly leading to the onset of diastemetaomyelia. These bands may divide the notochord, developing into duplications of the lower spine and spinal cord, the adjacent mesoderm is also divided, resulting in duplicates of GI and GU tracts. Subsequently, the duplications can also lead to the presence of a range of anomalies including dorsal enteric fistulas, enteric cysts, spina bifida, malformed or duplicated colon, bladder, sacrum, and lower spinal cord.

Moreover, a midline pelvic mass defect during gestation could be an obstacle to caudal migration of paramesonephric structures (Müllerian duct), which could lead to duplication of the genital tract. Whilst failures of migration or fusion of those structures is one of the more prevalent embryological theories for duplication of lower genitourinary organs such as the bladder. Intestinal duplications extending into the rectum or anus is often rare. However, if the caudal cell mass is divided early, duplications of the distal bowel may still occur.

In gastrointestinal abnormalities, a mechanism known as “caudal twinning” is proposed in which during the 23rd to 25th day of gestation, the intestinal tract is filled by rapid proliferation of endothelial cells, as the gut increases in size, vacuoles appear within the cell masses to constitute a single lumen. However, in abnormal cases where a vacuole is pinched off, a second lumen is created. The second lumen is then proposed to magnify in size in proportion to the growth of the colon, effectively duplicating all caudal structures distal from the point of separation.

== Diagnosis ==
The condition can often be seen as malformations that can be diagnosed by a prenatal anomaly scan in the second trimester, while progressively detailed examinations can be conducted after the first day of life of the baby. If an abnormality is detected early on, psychological and surgical preparation may be required to resort to a cesarean section to prevent obstructed labour, in which medical paediatric and surgical care soon follows after delivery.

Diagnosis during adulthood is extremely rare in cases where abnormalities are asymptomatic or are not visible upon physical inspection upon prenatal or birth inspections. Similarly to paediatric and prenatal diagnosis, an adulthood diagnosis can be made through various imaging modalities such as computed tomography (CT) scans to explicitly define the range of symptoms present in caudal duplication.

=== Classification ===
Dipygus deformity is a severe and extreme type of caudal duplication that occurs at the caudal end of the body axis, where it duplicates completely.

== Treatment ==
The rare, complex syndrome includes a wide spectrum of malformations ranging from partial or isolated to complete duplication of caudal organs in GI, GU, and neural systems. The syndrome may cause functional impairments such as an imperforate anus and hernia which may lead to death due to shock and organ failure and require prompt surgical intervention, but most presented symptoms are not life-threatening and duplicated organs are in fact functional in many cases. For instance, patients with genital duplication are mostly expected to have normal menstruation, sexual intercourse, and even pregnancy, although their self-esteem and quality of life may be influenced. Since the clinical presentation of each patient and its complexity vary greatly, the management which usually includes surgery are carefully planned and individualised based on the extent of duplication and functionality of the involved organs.

An extensive medical work-up is required primarily before prognosis to understand the anatomy of patients and to decide appropriate treatment. Imaging modalities such as echocardiography, conventional X-ray, magnetic resonance imaging (MRI), ultrasonography, barium enema, computed tomography (CT) scan, and voiding cystourethrography (VCU) can be used to examine anomalies in detail. Exploratory laparotomy can also be conducted when needed. In most cases, surgical approach is utilised to excise or fuse the duplicated organs; however, surgical intervention is not a compulsory procedure for patients that do not exhibit functional deterioration and symptoms. Based on the work-up results, a multidisciplinary team consisting of a (paediatric) surgeon, a urologist, and a neurosurgeon plans individualised, staged correction.

If a prenatal or after birth diagnosis is made, medical paediatric and surgery care are organised soon after delivery. Adults with the syndrome, however, usually do not require surgical treatment unless accompanied by symptoms or psychological issues. Reconstructive surgeries are performed to resolve the issue of functional impairments such as obstruction of colon, anatomic anomalies that hinder movement or cause infertility, and to improve cosmetic appearances in the case of genital duplication.

=== Gastrointestinal tract ===
Treatments for colonic duplication varies from conservative management for asymptomatic cases to excision of duplicated colon to avoid potential issues such as colon structure and obstruction. Resection is possible when each duplicated colon has a complete blood supply. If the duplicated colons share a wall, a septotomy can be performed to create a small hole to connect two colons. In cases where rectum is also duplicated, either the rectums should be converted into one reservoir through septotomy followed by anorectoplasty or the duplicated colon and rectum should be removed and colostomies should be constructed. For patients with poor prognosis for bowel control, a Malone procedure can be utilised during the colostomy. Alternatively, in cases of renal duplication, the Mitrofanoff procedure is performed instead.

=== Genitourinary tract ===
Duplication of genital tract that does not involve functional impairment does not require surgical intervention; however, plastic surgery can be carried out to improve patients’ self-esteem and social status. For duplication of female genital tract, the septum between duplicated organs such as vagina, cervix, and vulva are resected to combine two duplicated organs into one or one duplicated organ could be detached and excised. For male patients, one duplicated genitalia can be removed, and duplicated scrotum and testis can be either combined or excised. The external genitalia of both male and female can be reconstructed by midline apposition of tissues. For duplication of urinary tract, bladders can be combined to form a single larger bladder without altering the duplicated ureters.

=== Spinal and lower limb tract ===
In cases of spine duplication, prophylactic surgery can be done to remove one duplicated spine, although it depends on the severity of duplication. In cases of malformation of the neural cord such as myelomeningocele and tethered cord which accompanies severe symptoms, preserving neurological function is the utmost importance by closing myelomeningocele and detethering the neural cord. This is a highly complex procedure that requires extreme caution not to injure the rectum in which case can cause a cerebrospinal fluid infection. For duplication of lower limb which not only hinders patients’ gait but also is highly visible and may affect patients’ self-esteem, excision of the supernumerary, non-functional pair of limb is often carried out.

Due to the spectrum of symptoms present within caudal duplication, there is no uniform surgical treatment in relieving symptoms. The type and severity of surgical intervention is often dependent upon the type and complexity of symptoms presented. Thus, the primary goal of surgical treatment for the syndrome is to relieve symptoms, not to restore normal anatomy, and hence, potentially life-threatening malformations are addressed first and often followed by other anatomic or aesthetic reconstructions in later stages. After the medical treatment, the patients are periodically monitored.

== Epidemiology ==
Caudal duplication syndrome is a rare condition with fewer than 100 patients in literature worldwide as of 2014 with only two patients diagnosed in adulthood. The prevalence of the syndrome is less than one per 100,000 births. The sex ratio of male to female patients is about 1:2, with no familial or racial predisposition being found.

== History ==
The first systematic review for caudal duplication symptoms was done and the term "caudal duplication syndrome" was first proposed in 1993. The term was coined to describe rare anomalies associated with complete or partial duplication of caudal structures resulted from insults during embryogenesis to distinguish symptoms of spinal duplication syndrome which only involves spinal duplicity, only when there is associated complete or partial duplicity of vascular structures and/or organs such as bladder and distal gastrointestinal tract the term caudal duplication syndrome can be used.

However, recently in 2013, it was suggested that “duplication” is a misnomer based on an analysis of two cases and literature review in which researchers found “hemi” organs was “split” not duplicated, proposing caudal “split” syndrome may be a more appropriate title.

== See also ==
- Myrtle Corbin – American sideshow performer with two pelvises and four legs, who also successfully had children
