= Johannes Jacob Wecker =

Swiss physician (1528–1586)

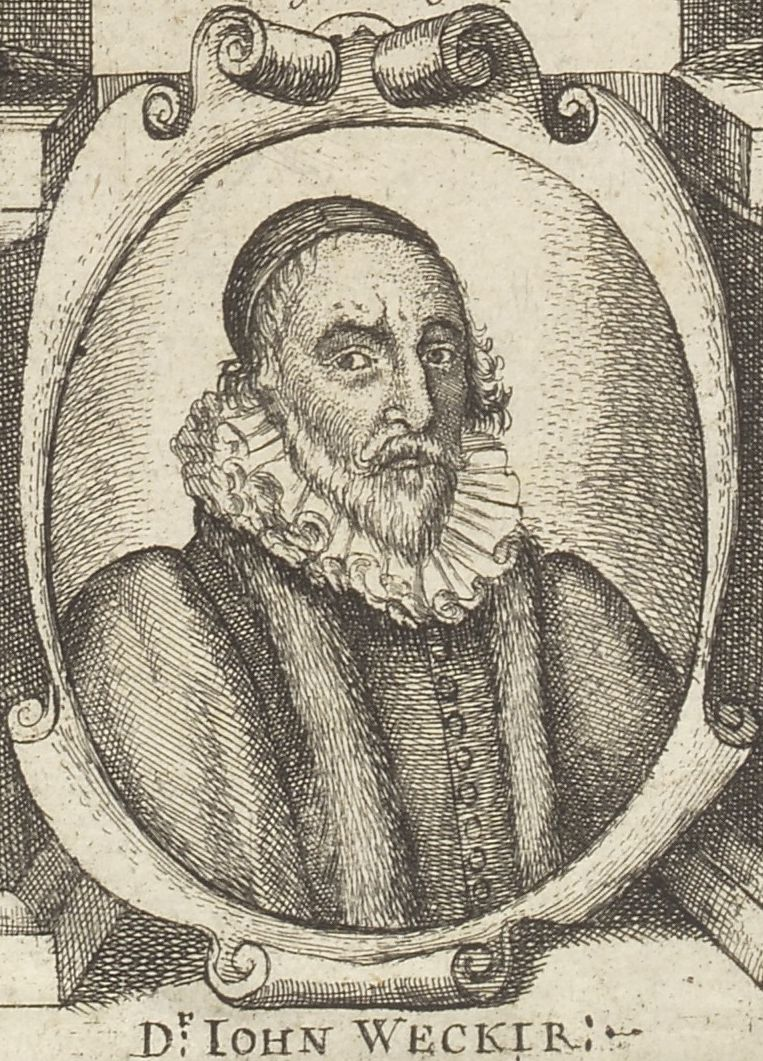
Johannes Jacob Wecker

Johannes Jacob Wecker (1528–1586) was a Swiss physician and philosopher.

He worked as a doctor from 1566 and wrote a number of works about medicine, some of which were in both French and Latin. Doubtless fleeing accusations of sorcery, Wecker moved to Basel after having published Les Secrets de Wecker. For a number of years, he worked as a professor of logic at the local university.

He published Antidotarum generale, a work about alchemy. His work is known for the elaborate bibliography on chemistry-alchemy. He also reported the first known case of diphallia.

Wecker married the poet and culinary writer Anna Weckerin. Two years after the death of her husband, she arranged for the publication in Basel of Wecker's Antidotarium Speciale, ex. opt. authorum … scriptis fideliter congestum et amplius triente actum.

== Works ==
- Medicae Syntaxes, medicinam universam ordine pulcherrimo complectentes . Basileae, 1562 Digital edition by the University and State Library Düsseldorf
- Antidotarium speciale . Cum duobus elenchis . Episcopius, [s.l.] 1574 Digital edition / 1581 Digital edition by the University and State Library Düsseldorf
- Medicinae utriusque syntaxes . Episcopius, [S.l.] 1582 Digital edition by the University and State Library Düsseldorf
- Kunstbuch Des Wolerfarnen Herren Alexii Pedemontani/ von mancherleyen nutzlichen unnd bewerten Secreten oder Künsten / jetzt newlich auß Welscher und Lateinischer Sprach in Teutsch gebracht/ durch Doctor Hanß Jacob Wecker/ Stattartzet zu Colmar. - Basel : König, 1616. Digital edition by the University and State Library Düsseldorf (in German)
- Antidotarium generale et speciale. - Basileae : König / Genath, (Nunc vero ... auctum; adiectis ind. 1617 Digital edition) / (Nunc vero supra priores editiones omnes multis novis et optimis formulis, maxima vero extractis auctum; adiectis indicibus locupletissim 1642 Digital edition by the University and State Library Düsseldorf)

== See also ==
- Books of secrets
