= William Reiner =

American urologist and psychiatrist

William G. Reiner is a urologist, psychiatrist and professor who worked and taught at Johns Hopkins Hospital and University of Oklahoma. He researched individuals with intersex conditions, cloacal exstrophy and bladder exstrophy.

Reiner carried out follow-up studies on males born with cloacal exstrophy who were reassigned and raised as females near birth. This condition is accompanied with normal prenatal androgen effects. Despite this reassignment, he found they were often masculine in play, interests, and sexually attracted to females. He believes that genetic males with male typical prenatal androgen effects should be reared male.

According to Bailey:

Reiner thinks that all the cloacal cases born as boys would be happier as boys rather than girls, because their brains have been biologically prepared for the male role. He thinks that those who remain girls are at best missing out, and at worst are experiencing great inner torment. He thinks their parents should tell them and, essentially, let them choose their sex.

According to an interview in The Boston Globe, Reiner has followed up on the sexual orientation of around 70 genetic males who were raised as girls. Only one reported having sexual attractions to males, "I’m more convinced than ever that sexual orientation is built in... certainly for males" he said.

Reiner trained in adult and pediatric urology at Johns Hopkins and worked with patients with bladder entropy and other urological birth conditions from 1976. He then trained in psychiatry and child psychiatry at Johns Hopkins, further working with exstrophy patients.

Reiner was on faculty at Johns Hopkins Hospital full-time until 2003, and then moved to part time. Between 2003 and 2016, he was also on the faulty at the University of Oklahoma Health Science Center as a professor, retiring in 2016 as a professor emeritus.
