= Supernumerary kidney =

Additional kidney present in an organism

A supernumerary kidney is an additional kidney to the number usually present in an organism. This often develops as the result of splitting of the nephrogenic blastema, or from separate metanephric blastemas into which partially or completely reduplicated ureteral stalks enter to form separate capsulated kidneys; in some cases the separation of the reduplicated organ is incomplete (fused supernumerary kidney).

Less than a hundred cases are known of one or two supernumerary kidneys.

== See also ==
- Supernumerary body part
