= Supernumerary phantom limb =

Perception of limbs that never existed

Supernumerary phantom limb is a condition where the affected individual believes they are receiving sensory information from limbs of the body that do not actually exist, and never have existed, in contradistinction to phantom limbs, which appear after an individual has had a limb removed from the body and still receives input from it.

An fMRI study of a subject with a supernumerary phantom left arm was done by Khateb et al. at the Laboratory of Experimental Neuropsychology at the University of Geneva. When the subject was told to touch her right cheek with the phantom limb, there was increased activity in the motor cortex of her brain in the area roughly corresponding to the left arm. When she announced that she had touched the phantom limb to her cheek, activity was monitored in the area of the somatosensory cortex that corresponded to the right cheek. At times during the experiment, the subject was asked to move the phantom limb to a location that was obstructed or otherwise unfeasible. In these instances, there was similar activation of the motor cortex but no such activity in the somatosensory cortex.

== Affected areas of the brain ==
- Motor cortex
- Somatosensory cortex
- Tactile (touch) controlling areas

== See also ==
- Body identity integrity disorder – Mental disorder characterized by a desire to be physically disabled
- Supernumerary body part – Growth of an additional part of the body and a deviation from the body plan
