= Urorectal septum =

Invagination of the cloaca that separates the hindgut from the urogenital sinus

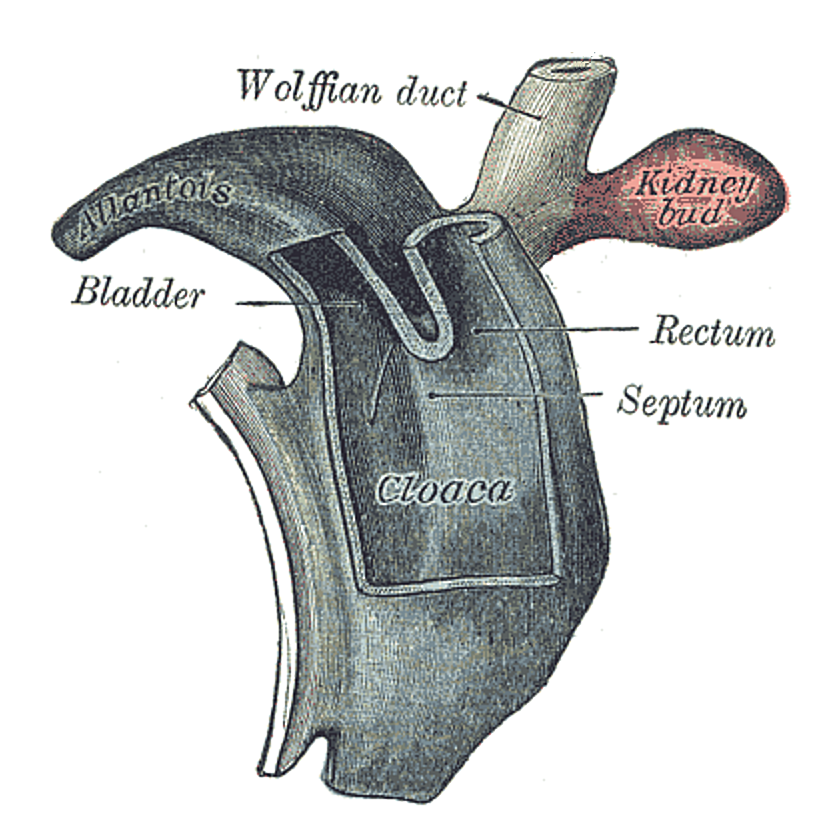
- Cloaca of human embryo from twenty-five to twenty-seven days old.

Details
- Days: 32
- Precursor: Cloaca
- System: Genitourinary system

Identifiers
- Latin: septum urorectale
- TE: septum_by_E5.4.9.0.2.0.14 E5.4.9.0.2.0.14

The urorectal septum is an invagination of the cloaca. It divides it into a dorsal part (the hindgut) and a ventral part (the urogenital sinus). It invaginates from cranial to caudal, formed from the endodermal cloaca, and fuses with the cloacal membrane. Malformations can cause fistulas.

== Structure ==
The urorectal septum is an embryonic structure formed from an invagination of the cloaca. The urorectal septum divides the cloaca into two parts:

- a dorsal part, forming part of the hindgut, which forms the rectum and the anus.
- a ventral part, forming the urogenital sinus, which forms the allantois, which becomes the urinary bladder.

The urorectal septum becomes part of the perineal body, helping to form the perineum.

=== Development ===
The urorectal septum develops from cranial to caudal, and is flat in the coronal plane. It is formed from endoderm, the same germ layer as the cloaca. It fuses with the cloacal membrane.

== Clinical significance ==
=== Urorectal septum malformation ===
Malformation of the urorectal septum can lead to several different types of fistulas.

==== Classification ====
In women, at least five different types of fistula are possible. All of these involve the fusion of the urogenital sinus and the end of the hindgut, causing the rectum to end in the vagina. This may be associated with the uterus in the normal position, posterior to the hindgut, or bicornuate.

In men, at least three different types of fistula are possible. The hindgut may enter and preserve the urogenital sinus after birth. The hindgut may replace the urogenital sinus completely, in which case it may also replace the urinary bladder and cause the ureters to drain into it.

==== Prognosis ====
Urorectal septum malformation is associated with a number of other birth defects, including spina bifida, deafness, sacral hypoplasia, atrial septal defect, ventricular septal defect, tetralogy of Fallot, and limb musculoskeletal disorders. Mainly because of these associations, up to 20% of children born with urorectal septum malformation may not survive long-term. Outcomes from corrective surgery on a urorectal septum fistula are very good.
