= Pelvic digit =

Rare congenital abnormality in humans

Radiograph showing a pelvic digit

A pelvic digit, pelvic finger, or pelvic rib is a rare congenital abnormality in humans, in which bone tissue develops in the soft tissue near the pelvis, resembling a rib or finger and often divided into one or more segments with pseudo-articulations. Pelvic digits are typically benign and asymptomatic, and are usually discovered accidentally. Approximately 41 cases have been reported.

The pelvic digit was first reported by D. Sullivan and W.S. Cornwell in 1974. Pelvic digits may be located at any level of the pelvis, the lower ribs, or even the anterior abdominal wall. It is theorized that pelvic digit anomalies arise during the mesenchymal stage of bone growth, within the first six weeks of embryogenesis. Their formation may result from a failure of the primordium of the coccyx to fuse to the vertebral column, leading to the independent development of a proto-rib structure.

== See also ==
- Supernumerary body part
