= Anorectal canal =

Embryonic structure in placental mammals

The anorectal canal is an embryonic structure in placental mammals that develops from the posterior portion of the cloaca, after it is divided by the urorectal septum in the 6th week of embryonic development. The anterior portion becomes the urogenital sinus. The anorectal canal develops into the rectum and the anal canal.
