= Corpus (museum) =

Dutch human biology museum

Coordinates: 52°10′11″N 4°27′7″E

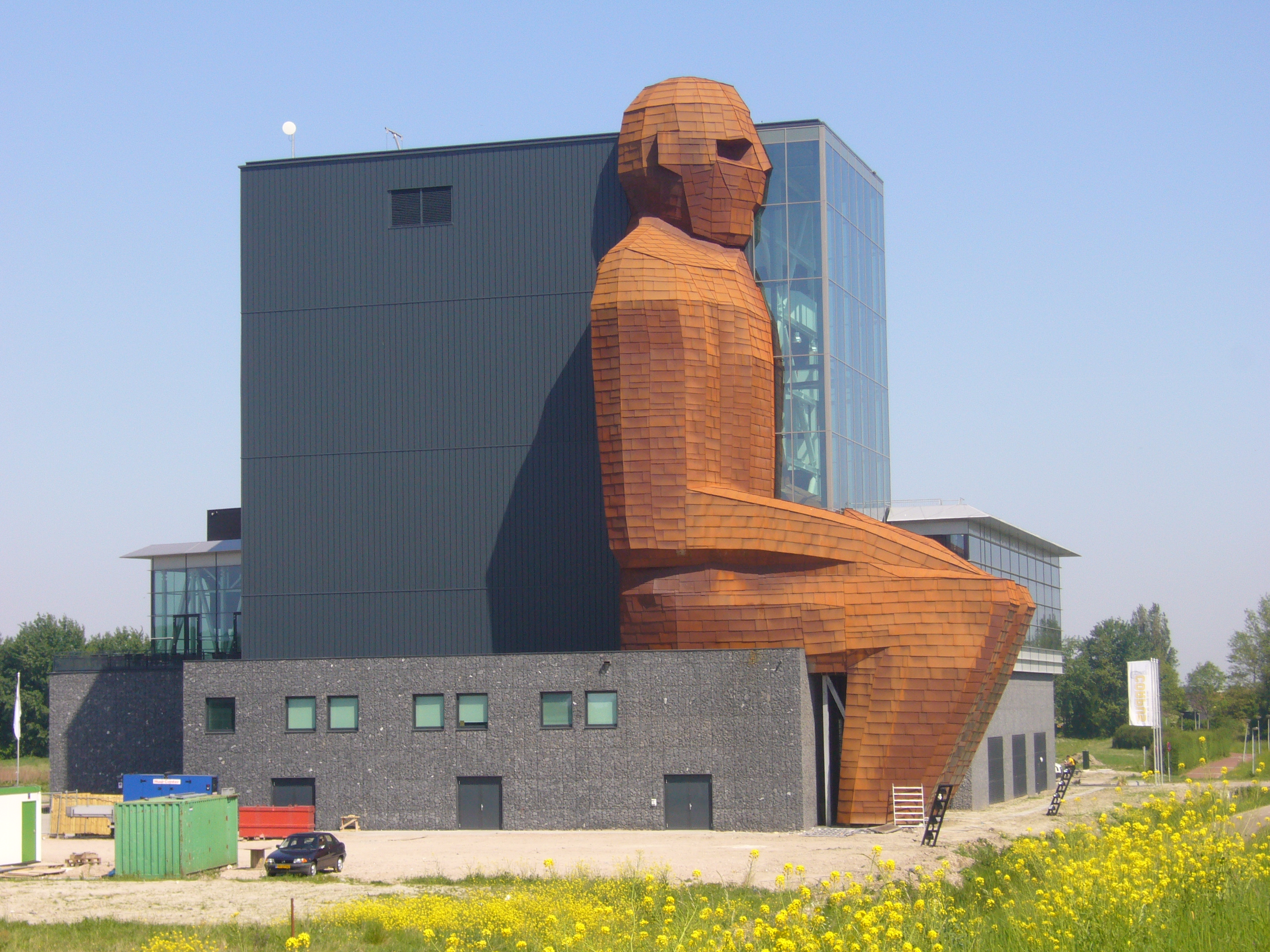
The museum

The Corpus Museum is a human biology interactive museum, located in Oegstgeest, near Leiden, in the Netherlands.

Billed as "a journey through the human body", the museum provides both education and entertainment through a combination of permanent and variable collections.

Opened in 2008 by Queen Beatrix, the museum is the world's first museum of its type.
