= Polyorchidism =

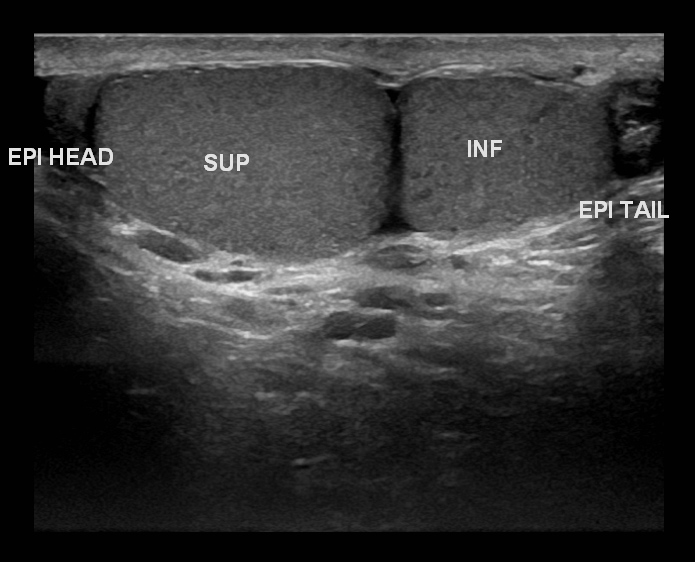
- Ultrasound scan showing a side view of Type A3 polyorchidism, with annotations showing the superior and inferior testes and the head and tail of the epididymis

Polyorchidism is the incidence of more than two testicles. It is a very rare congenital disorder, with fewer than 200 cases reported in medical literature and six cases (two horses, two dogs and two cats) in veterinary literature.

Polyorchidism is generally diagnosed via an ultrasound examination of the testicles. However, the diagnosis of polyorchidism should include histological confirmation. The most common form is triorchidism, or tritestes, where three testicles are present. The condition is usually asymptomatic. A man who has polyorchidism is known as a polyorchid.

== Classification ==
Polyorchidism occurs in two primary forms: Type A and Type B.

- Type A: The supernumerary testicle is connected to a vas deferens. These testicles are usually reproductively functional. Type A is further subdivided into:
  - Type A1: Complete duplication of the testicle, epididymis and vas deferens.
  - Type A2: The supernumerary testicle has its own epididymis and shares a vas deferens.
  - Type A3: The supernumerary testicle shares the epididymis and the vas deferens of the other testicles.
- Type B: The supernumerary testicle is not connected to a vas deferens and is therefore not reproductively functional. Type B is further subdivided into:
  - Type B1: The supernumerary testicle has its own epididymis but is not connected to a vas deferens
  - Type B2: The supernumerary testicle consists only of testicular tissue.

Type A3 is the most common form of polyorchidism, and types A2 and A3 together account for more than 90% of cases. In 65% of cases, the supernumerary testicle is found in the left scrotal sac.

=== Numeric system ===
An older system of classification structures polyorchidism into similar types, but with no subdivision between connected and disconnected testicles:

- Type 1: The supernumerary testicle lacks an epididymis and vas deferens and has no connection to the other testicles.
- Type 2: The supernumerary testicle shares the epididymis and the vas deferens of the other testicles.
- Type 3: The supernumerary testicle has its own epididymis and shares a vas deferens.
- Type 4: Complete duplication of the testicle, epididymis and vas deferens.

== Cause ==
=== Complications ===
Most cases of polyorchidism are asymptomatic, and are discovered incidentally, in the course of treating another condition. In the majority of cases, the supernumerary testicle is found in the scrotum.

However, polyorchidism can occur in conjunction with cryptorchidism, where the supernumerary testicle is undescended or found elsewhere in the body. These cases are associated with a significant increase in the incidence of testicular cancer: 0.004% for the general population vs 5.7% for a supernumerary testicle not found in the scrotum.

Polyorchidism can also occur in conjunction with infertility, inguinal hernia, testicular torsion, epididymitis, hydrocele testis and varicocele. However, it is not clear whether polyorchidism causes or aggravates these conditions, or whether the existence of these conditions leads sufferers to seek medical attention and thus become diagnosed with a previously undetected supernumerary testicle.

== Management ==
Because polyorchidism is very uncommon, there is no standard treatment for the condition. Prior to advances in ultrasound technology, it was common practice to remove the supernumerary testicle. Several cases have been described where routine follow-up examinations conducted over a period of years showed that the supernumerary testicle was stable.

A meta-analysis in 2009 suggested removing non-scrotal supernumerary testicles because of the increased risk of cancer, and regular follow-up in the remaining cases to ensure that the supernumerary testicle remains stable.
