= Corpus cavernosum =

Corpus cavernosum may refer to:

- Corpus cavernosum clitoridis
- Corpus cavernosum penis
- "Corpus cavernosum urethrae" was used in older texts for corpus spongiosum.
