= Cloaca (embryology) =

Structure in the embryo

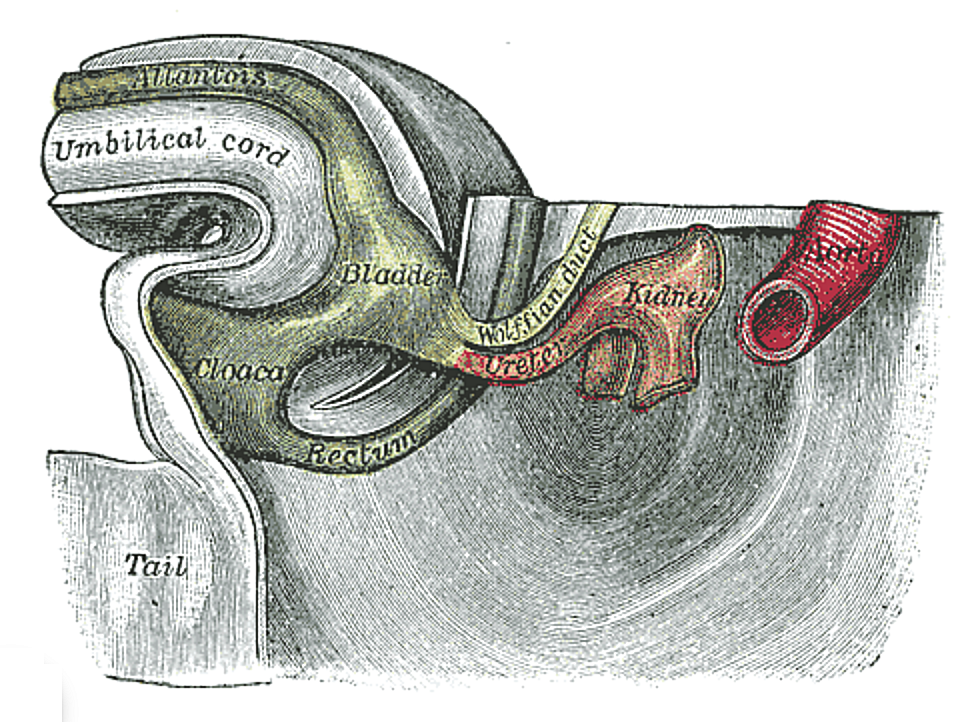
- Tail end of human embryo thirty-two to thirty-three days old. Cloaca is visible at center left. The endodermal cloaca is labeled with green, while the ectodermal cloaca is seen as a colorless crest on the outside.

Details
- Days: 15
- Precursor: Endoderm
- Gives rise to: Urogenital sinus (anteriorly) and anorectal canal (posteriorly)

Identifiers
- TE: (embryology)_by_E5.4.0.0.0.0.14 E5.4.0.0.0.0.14

The cloaca (pl.: cloacae) is a structure in the development of the urinary and reproductive organs.

The hind-gut is at first prolonged backward into the body-stalk as the tube of the allantois; but, with the growth and flexure of the tail-end of the embryo, the body-stalk, with its contained allantoic tube, is carried forward to the ventral aspect of the body, and consequently a bend is formed at the junction of the hind-gut and allantois.

This bend becomes dilated into a pouch, which constitutes the endodermal cloaca; into its dorsal part the hind-gut opens, and from its ventral part the allantois passes forward.

At a later stage, the Wolffian duct and Müllerian duct open into its ventral portion.

The cloaca is, for a time, shut off from the anterior by the cloacal membrane, formed by the apposition of the ectoderm and endoderm, and reaching, at first, as far forward as the future umbilicus.

Behind the umbilicus, however, the mesoderm subsequently extends to form the lower part of the abdominal wall and pubic symphysis.

By the growth of the surrounding tissues, the cloacal membrane comes to lie at the bottom of a depression, which is lined by ectoderm and named the ectodermal cloaca.

== Outcome ==
While most vertebrates retain a cloaca, an opening for the reproductive, urinary and digestive systems, the embryonic cloaca splits into the following in placental mammals:

- Males: the urethra opening into the penis for both urination and reproduction
- Females: the urethra and vagina opening into the vestibule/vulva for urination and reproduction respectively
- Both sexes: the rectum opening as the anus for defecation

== Clinical significance ==
A birth defect can arise known as a persistent cloaca where the rectum, vagina, and urinary tract fuse to create a common channel or cloaca.

A rare birth defect which leaves much of the abdominal organs exposed is known as cloacal exstrophy.

== Additional images ==
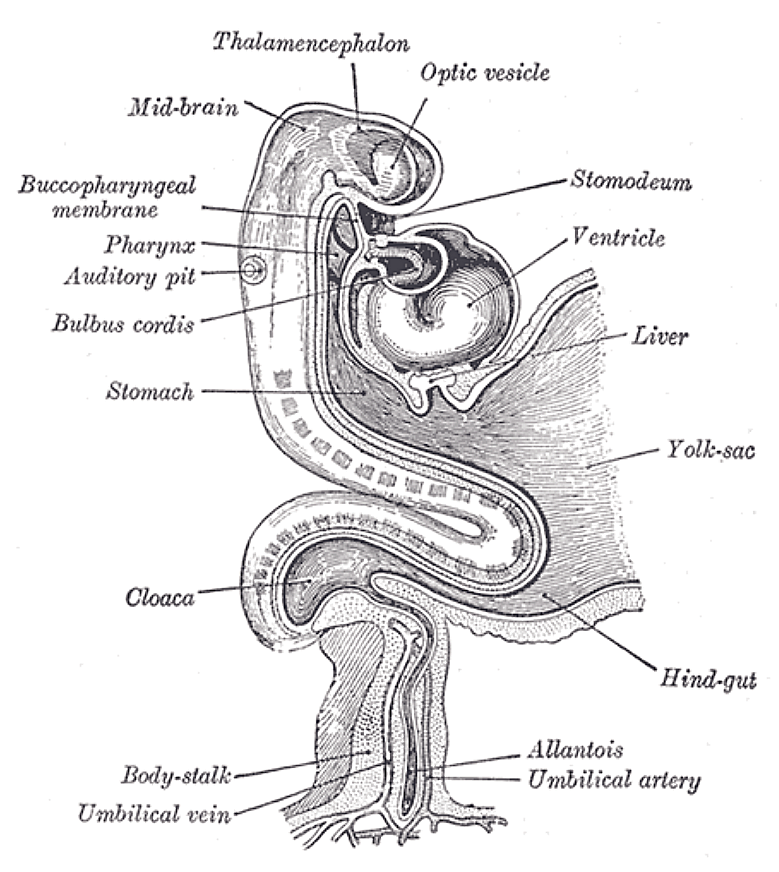
Human embryo about fifteen days old.

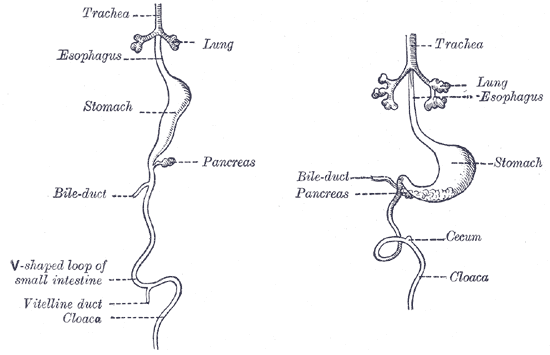
Front view of two successive stages in the development of the digestive tube.

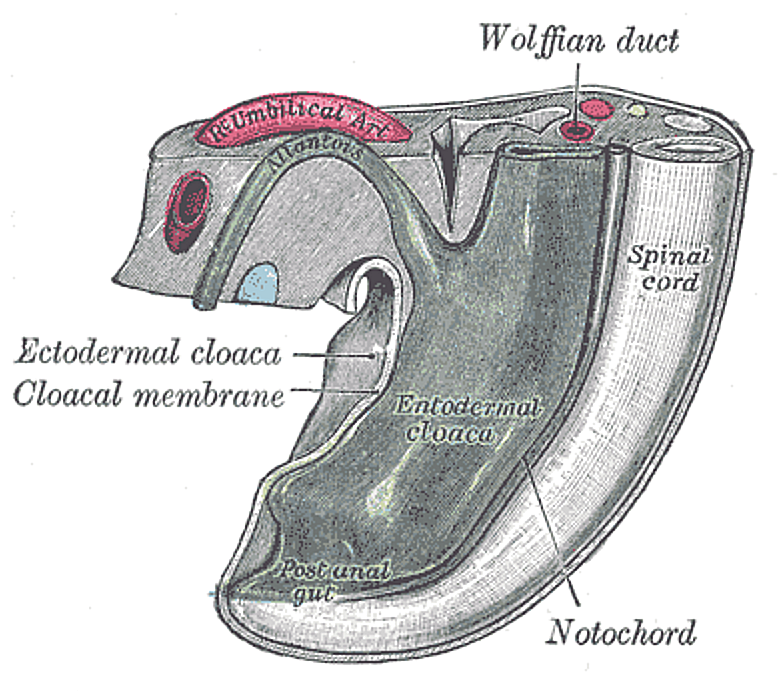
Tail end of human embryo from fifteen to eighteen days old.

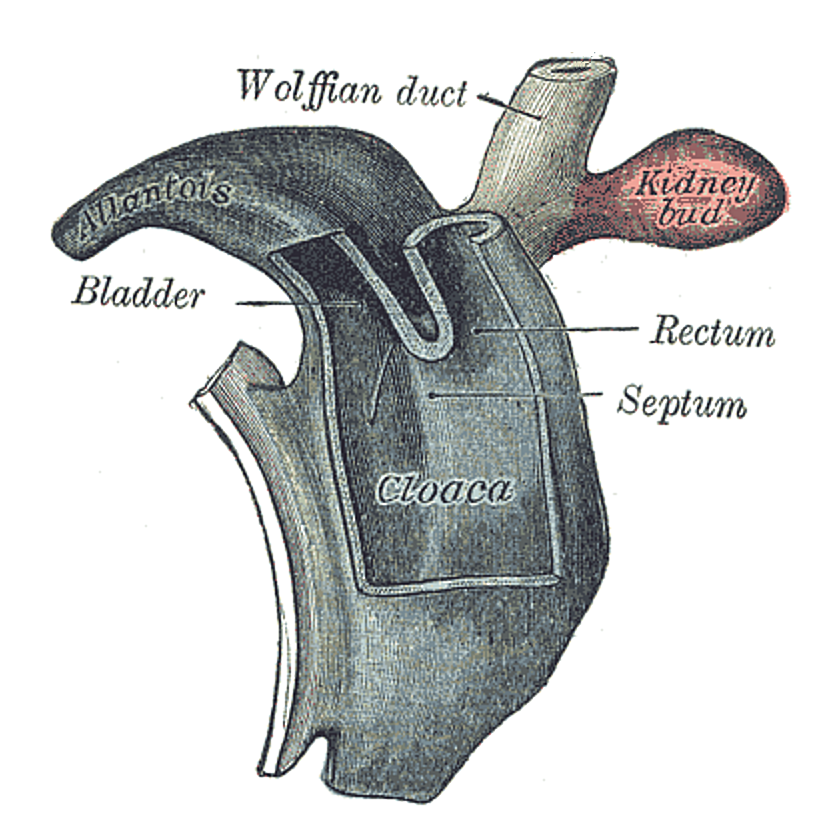
Cloaca of human embryo from twenty-five to twenty-seven days old.

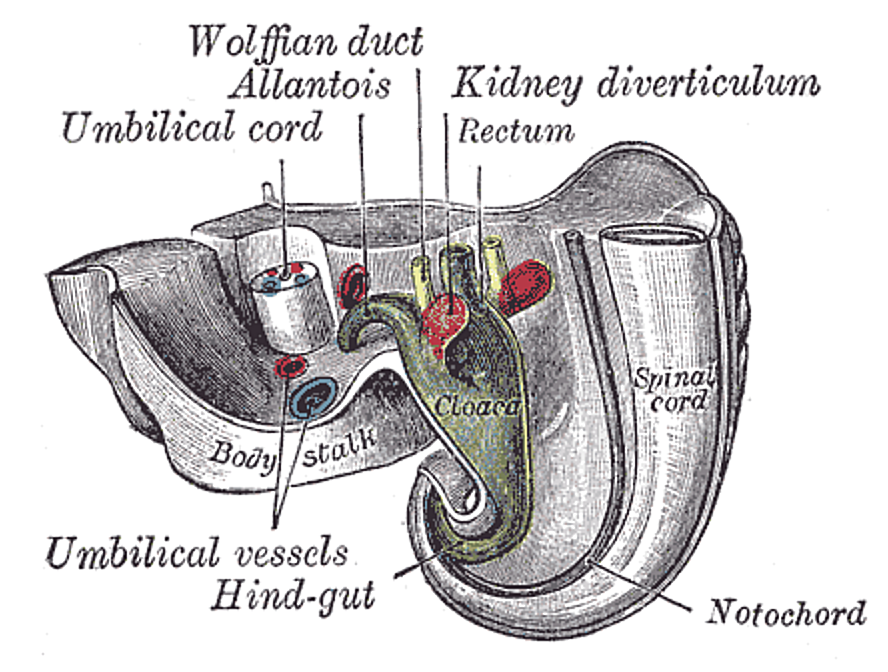
Tail end of human embryo twenty-five to twenty-nine days old.

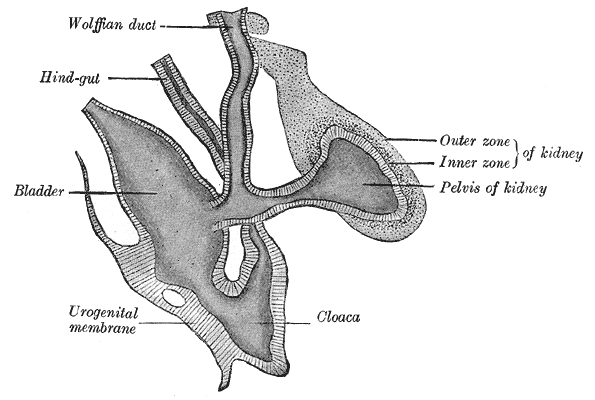
Primitive kidney and bladder, from a reconstruction.

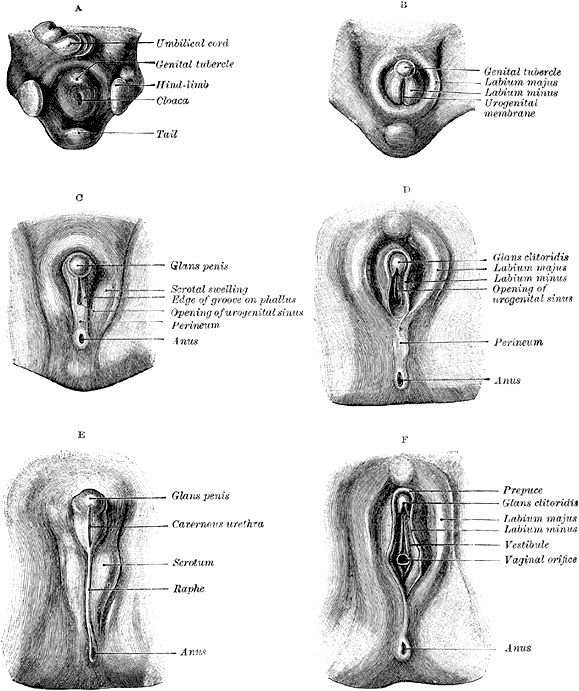
Stages in the development of the external sexual organs in the male and female.
