= Cloacal membrane =

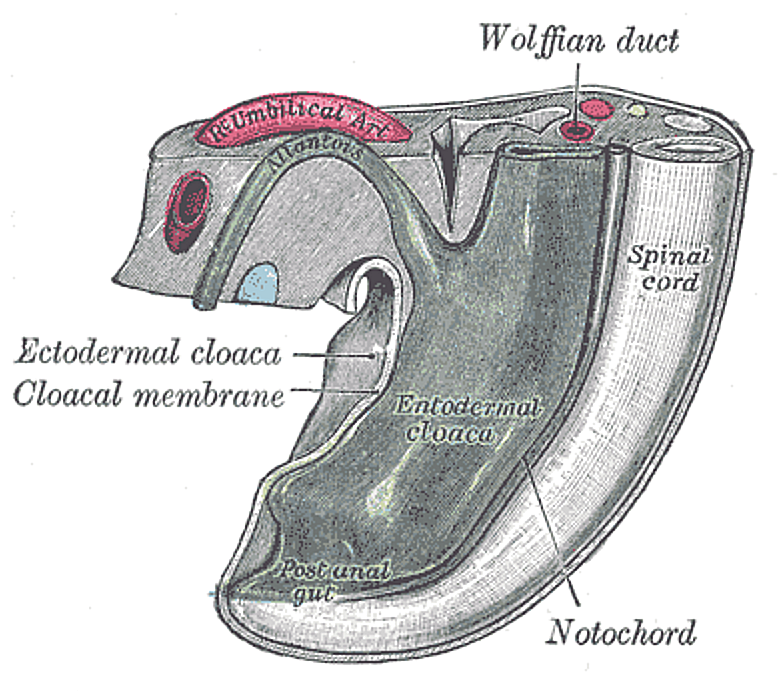
- Tail end of human embryo from fifteen to eighteen days old.

Details
- Carnegie stage: 7
- Days: 15
- Precursor: Caudal end of the primitive streak

Identifiers
- Latin: membrana cloacalis
- TE: membrane_by_E5.4.0.0.0.0.15 E5.4.0.0.0.0.15

The cloacal membrane is the membrane that covers the embryonic cloaca during the development of the urinary and reproductive organs.

It is formed by ectoderm and endoderm coming into contact with each other. As the human embryo grows and caudal folding continues, the urorectal septum divides the cloaca into a ventral urogenital sinus and dorsal anorectal canal. Before the urorectal septum has an opportunity to fuse with the cloacal membrane, the membrane ruptures, exposing the urogenital sinus and dorsal anorectal canal to the exterior. Later on, an ectodermal plug, the anal membrane, forms to create the lower third of the rectum. It ruptures in the seventh week of gestation.
