= Cloacal exstrophy =

- Other names: Omphalocele-cloacal exstrophy-imperforate anus-spinal defect syndrome
- Specialty: Medical genetics
- Complications: Limb deformities, open neural tube defects
- Treatment: Surgical intervention

Cloacal exstrophy (CE) is a severe birth defect wherein much of the abdominal organs (the bladder and intestines) are exposed. It often causes the splitting of the bladder, genitalia, and the anus. It is sometimes called OEIS complex.

Diagnostic tests can include ultrasound, voiding cystourethrogram (VCUG), intravenous pyelogram (IVP), nuclear renogram, computerized axial tomography (CT scan), and magnetic resonance imaging (MRI). Cloacal exstrophy is a rare birth defect, present in 1/200,000 pregnancies and 1/400,000 live births. It is associated with a defect of the ventral body wall and can be caused by inhibited mesodermal migration. The defect can often be comorbid with spinal bifida and kidney abnormalities. Many individuals who are born with XY cloacal exstrophy are assigned female at birth due to the appearance of the external genitalia. Performing genital surgery on intersex infants for cosmetic purposes is considered a human rights violation by the World Health Organization.

== Cloacal exstrophy males reassigned and raised as females ==
Between 1960 and 2000, doctors believed XY males with cloacal exstrophy would be happier socially as females, and surgically reassigned them. This occurred under the belief that humans were born psychosexually neutral. The practice proved controversial, after follow-ups by William Reiner found that many struggled to adhere to a female gender identity, had masculine interests, were attracted to females, or reverted to the male sex spontaneously or upon learning they were genetic males.

According to J. Michael Bailey:

Reiner thinks that all the cloacal cases born as boys would be happier as boys rather than girls, because their brains have been biologically prepared for the male role. He thinks that those who remain girls are at best missing out, and at worst are experiencing great inner torment. He thinks their parents should tell them and, essentially, let them choose their sex.

In terms of their sexual orientations, a 2016 academic review by J. Michael Bailey found 7 published cases of genetic males who were reassigned as females at birth and raised as girls, 5 of whom were cloacal exstrophy cases. All were strongly attracted to females. According to a 2015 article in The Boston Globe, Wiliam Reiner has followed up on the sexual orientations of approximately 70 genetic males who were raised as females. Only one reported having sexual attractions to males, "I’m more convinced than ever that sexual orientation is built in... certainly for males" he said. A 2023 review by Swift-Gallant et al. cited an additional two cases from media reports, both of whom were gynephilic (attracted to women).

Reiner's results have caused some doctors to reconsider the practice of sex reassigning genetic males. A 2011 study found that 79% of paediatric urologists surveyed favoured male assignment for genetic males with cloacal exstrophy.

=== Cases in the media ===
- Joe Holliday, a British cloacal exstrophy male who was reassigned and raised as a female. Holliday had masculine interests and is attracted to females. He found out he was a genetic male at age 25, and reverted to living as a male.
- Sophie Ottaway, a British cloacal exstrophy male who was reassigned and raised as a female. Ottaway found out about her genetic sex at age 22. She retained female identity, although believes the reassignment was incorrect. She is attracted to women.

== See also ==
- Bladder exstrophy
- Epispadias
