= Bladder exstrophy =

Protrusion of the bladder through the abdominal wall

- Other names: Ectopia vesicae
- Specialty: Medical genetics
- Frequency: 0.005%

Bladder exstrophy is a congenital anomaly that exists along the spectrum of the exstrophy-epispadias complex, and most notably involves protrusion of the urinary bladder through a defect in the abdominal wall. Its presentation is variable, often including abnormalities of the bony pelvis, pelvic floor, and genitalia. The underlying embryologic mechanism leading to bladder exstrophy is unknown, though it is thought to be in part due to failed reinforcement of the cloacal membrane by underlying mesoderm. Exstrophy means the inversion of a hollow organ.

== Signs and symptoms ==
The classic manifestation of bladder exstrophy presents with:

- A defect in the abdominal wall occupied by both the exstrophied bladder as well as a portion of the urethra
- A flattened puborectal sling
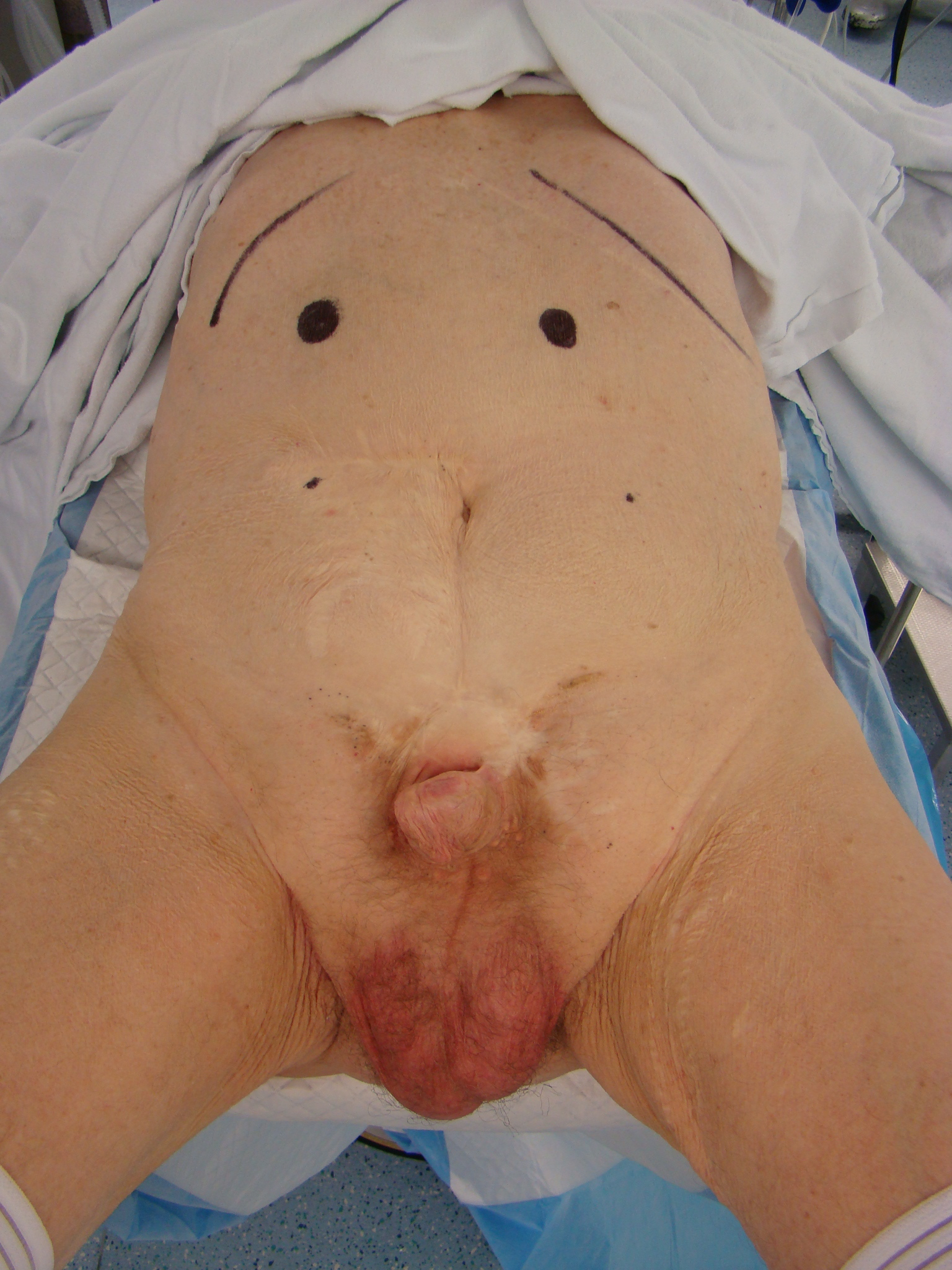
- Male with epispadias and surgically repaired bladder exstrophy.
  Separation of the pubic symphysis
- Shortening of a pubic ramus
- External rotation of the pelvis.

Females frequently have a displaced and narrowed vaginal orifice, a bifid clitoris, and divergent labia.

== Cause ==
The cause is not yet clinically established but is thought to be in part due to failed reinforcement of the cloacal membrane by underlying mesoderm.

== Diagnosis ==
In a small retrospective study of 25 pregnancies, five factors were found to be strongly associated with a prenatal diagnosis of bladder exstrophy:

- Inability to visualize the bladder on ultrasound
- A lower abdominal bulge
- A small penis with anteriorly displaced scrotum
- A low set umbilical insertion
- Abnormal widening of the iliac crests

While a diagnosis of bladder exstrophy was made retrospectively in a majority of pregnancies, in only three cases was a prenatal diagnosis made.

== Management ==
The extreme rarity of the disease limits the surgical opportunities to practice the complex closure required in these patients. For this reason, patients have the best outcomes when the bladder closures are performed at high volume centers where surgical and nursing teams have extensive experience in caring for the disease. The highest volume center in the United States, and the world, is the Johns Hopkins Hospital in Baltimore, Maryland; they have seen over 1300 exstrophy patients in the past 50 years.

Upon delivery, the exposed bladder is irrigated and a non-adherent film is placed to prevent as much contact with the external environment as possible. In the event the child was not born at a medical center with an appropriate exstrophy support team then transfer will likely follow. Upon transfer, or for those infants born at a medical center able to care for bladder exstrophy, imaging may take place in the first few hours of life prior to the child undergoing surgery.

Primary (immediate) closure is indicated only in those patients with a bladder of appropriate size, elasticity, and contractility as those patients are most likely to develop a bladder of adequate capacity after early surgical intervention.

Conditions that are absolute contraindications despite bladder adequacy include duplication of the penis or scrotum and significant bilateral hydronephrosis.

=== Surgery ===
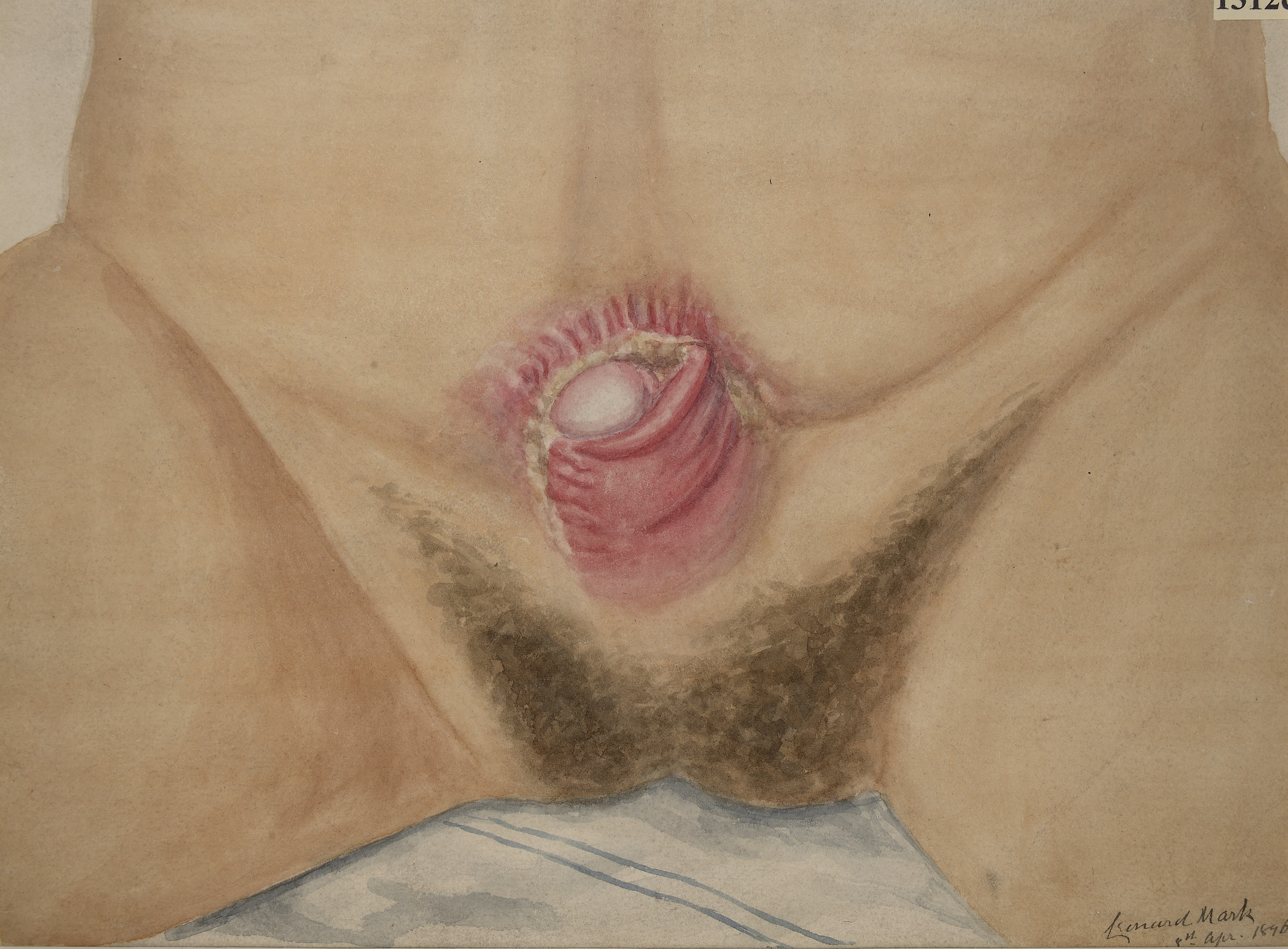
Watercolour drawing of ectopia vesicae in a man aged 23 years, after operation

Modern therapy is aimed at surgical reconstruction of the bladder and genitalia. Both males and females are born with this anomaly. Treatment is similar.

In males treatments have been: In the modern staged repair of exstrophy (MSRE) the initial step is closure of the abdominal wall, often requiring a pelvic osteotomy. This leaves the patient with penile epispadias and urinary incontinence. At approximately 2–3 years of age, the patient then undergoes repair of the epispadias after testosterone stimulation. Finally, bladder neck repair usually occurs around the age of 4–5 years, though this is dependent upon a bladder with adequate capacity and, most importantly, an indication that the child is interested in becoming continent. In some of the bladder reconstructions, the bladder is augmented with the addition of a segment of the large intestines to increase the volume capacity of the reconstructed bladder. In the complete primary repair of exstrophy (CPRE) the bladder closure is combined with an epispadias repair, in an effort to decrease costs and morbidity. This technique has, however, led to significant loss of penile and corporal tissue, particularly in younger patients.

In females treatment has included: Surgical reconstruction of the clitoris, which is separated into two distinct bodies. Surgical reconstruction to correct the split of the mons, redefine the structure of the bladder neck and urethra. Vaginoplasty will correct the anteriorly displaced vagina. If the anus is involved, it is also repaired. Fertility remains and women who were born with bladder exstrophy usually develop prolapse due to the weaker muscles of the pelvic floor.

== Bladder exstrophy males reassigned and raised as females ==
Between 1960 and 2000, doctors believed XY males with cloacal exstrophy (the most extreme form of bladder exstrophy) would be happier socially as females, and surgically reassigned them. This occurred under the belief that humans were born psychosexually

neutral. The practice proved controversial, after follow-ups by William Reiner found that many struggled to adhere to a female gender identity, had masculine interests, were attracted to females, or reverted to the male sex spontaneously or upon learning they were genetic males.

According to J. Michael Bailey:

Reiner thinks that all the cloacal cases born as boys would be happier as boys rather than girls, because their brains have been biologically prepared for the male role. He thinks that those who remain girls are at best missing out, and at worst are experiencing great inner torment. He thinks their parents should tell them and, essentially, let them choose their sex.

In terms of their sexual orientations, a 2016 academic review by J. Michael Bailey found 7 published cases of boys reassigned female at birth and raised as girls, of which 5 were cloacal exstrophy cases. All were strongly attracted to females. According to a 2015 article in The Boston Globe, Wiliam Reiner has followed up on the sexual orientations of approximately 70 genetic males who were raised as females. Only one reported having sexual attractions to males, "I’m more convinced than ever that sexual orientation is built in... certainly for males" he said. A 2023 review by Swift-Gallant et al. also cited two additional cases from media reports, both of whom were gynephilic.

Reiner's results have caused some doctors to reconsider the practice of sex reassigning genetic males. A 2011 study found that 79% of paediatric urologists surveyed favoured male assignment for genetic males with cloacal exstrophy.

=== Cases in the media ===
- Joe Holliday. British cloacal exstrophy male who was raised female. Masculine interests and attracted to females. Found out born male at age 25, and reverted to male sex.
- Sophie Ottaway. British cloacal exstrophy male raised as a female. Found out about birth sex at age 22. Retained female identity, although believes the reassignment was incorrect. Attracted to women.

== Prognosis ==
The most important criterion for improving long-term prognosis is success of the initial closure. If a patient requires more than one closure their chance of continence drops off precipitously with each additional closure - at just two closures the chance of voiding continence is just 17%.

Even with successful surgery, people may have long-term complications. Some of the most common include:

- Vesicoureteral reflux
- Bladder spasm
- Bladder calculus
- Urinary tract infections

== Epidemiology ==
Occurring at a rate between 1 in 10,000 to 1 in 50,000 with a male-to-female ratio of 2.3–6:1, bladder exstrophy is relatively rare. For those individuals with bladder exstrophy who maintain their ability to reproduce, the risk of bladder exstrophy in their children is approximately 500-fold greater than the general population.
