= Alpine skiing at the Winter Paralympics =

- Governing body: WA
- Events: 30 (men: 15; women: 15)

Games
- 1976; 1980; 1984; 1988; 1992; 1994; 1998; 2002; 2006; 2010; 2014; 2018; 2022; 2026
- Medalists

Para alpine skiing has been competed at the Winter Paralympic Games since they were first held in 1976. Events include men's and women's downhill, super-G, giant slalom, slalom, and combined.

Since the 2006 Winter Games in Turin, a three-category system is used. The three categories are: sitting, standing, and visually impaired.

== Summary ==
Games	Year	Events	Best Nation
1	1976	28	Switzerland
2	1980	22	Austria
3	1984	56	Austria
4	1988	43	Austria
5	1992	48	United States
6	1994	66	United States
7	1998	54	United States
8	2002	53	United States
9	2006	24	Germany
10	2010	30	Germany
11	2014	30	Russia
12	2018	30	Slovakia
13	2022	30	Austria
14	2026	30	Austria

== Events ==
Event	Class	76	80	84	88	92	94	98	02	06	10	14	18	22	26	Years
Men's combined	Standing	• • • • •		• • • • • • •							•	•		4		
Men's combined	Visually impaired			• •							•	•		3		
Men's combined	Sitting										•	•		2		
Men's downhill	Standing			• • • • • • •	• • • • • • •	• • • •	• • • • • •	• • • •	• • • •	•	•	•		9		
Men's downhill	Visually impaired			• •	• • •		• •	• •	•	•	•	•		8		
Men's downhill	Sitting					• •	• • •	• •	• • •	•	•	•		7		
Men's slalom	Standing	• • • • •	• • • • • •	• • • • • • •	• • • • • • •	• • • •	• • • • • •	• • • • •	• • • •	•	•	•		11		
Men's slalom	Visually impaired						• •	• •	• •	•	•	•		6		
Men's slalom	Sitting				•	• •	• • •	• •	• • •	•	•	•		8		
Men's giant slalom	Standing	• • • • •	• • • • • •	• • • • • • •	• • • • • • •	• • • •	• • • • • •	• • • • •	• • • •	•	•	•		11		
Men's giant slalom	Visually impaired			• •	• • •	• • •	• • •	• •	• •	•	•	•		9		
Men's giant slalom	Sitting				•	• •	• • •	• •	• • •	•	•	•		8		
Men's Super-G	Standing					• • • •	• • • • • •	• • • • •	• • • •	•	•	•		7		
Men's Super-G	Visually impaired					• • •	• • •	• •	•	•	•	•		7		
Men's Super-G	Sitting					• •	• • •	• •	• • •	•	•	•		7		
Women's combined	Standing	• • • •		• • • •							•	•		4		
Women's combined	Visually impaired			• •							•	•		3		
Women's combined	Sitting										•	•		2		
Women's downhill	Standing			• • • •	• • •	• • •	• • •	• •	• •	•	•	•		9		
Women's downhill	Visually impaired			• •	• •		•	•	•	•	•	•		8		
Women's downhill	Sitting					•	•	•	•	•	•	•		7		
Women's slalom	Standing	• • • •	• • • • •	• • • •	• • •	• • •	• • •	• •	• • •	•	•	•		11		
Women's slalom	Visually impaired						•	• •	•	•	•	•		6		
Women's slalom	Sitting				•	•	•	•	•	•	•	•		8		
Women's giant slalom	Standing	• • • • •	• • • • •	• • • •	• • •	• • •	• • •	• •	• • •	•	•	•		11		
Women's giant slalom	Visually impaired			• •	• •	•	•	• •	•	•	•	•		9		
Women's giant slalom	Sitting				•	•	•	•	• •	•	•	•		8		
Women's Super-G	Standing					• • •	• • •	• •	• •	•	•	•		7		
Women's Super-G	Visually impaired					•	•	• •	•	•	•	•		7		
Women's Super-G	Sitting					•	•	•	•	•	•	•		7		
Total Events		28	22	56	44	48	66	54	53	24	30	30	30			

== Medal table ==
NPCs in italics no longer compete at the Winter Paralympics

As of 2026 Winter Paralympics

Rank	Nation	Gold	Silver	Bronze	Total
1	Austria (AUT)	101	95	97	293
2	United States (USA)	91	98	71	260
3	Germany (GER)	85	62	60	207
4	Switzerland (SUI)	49	41	27	117
5	France (FRA)	44	46	38	128
6	Canada (CAN)	27	40	53	120
7	Slovakia (SVK)	18	18	24	60
8	Spain (ESP)	18	15	11	44
9	New Zealand (NZL)	17	8	11	36
10	Italy (ITA)	16	27	23	66
11	Sweden (SWE)	15	12	11	38
12	Norway (NOR)	12	7	4	23
13	Japan (JPN)	11	17	22	50
14	Russia (RUS)	11	7	10	28
15	Australia (AUS)	11	6	15	32
16	Czech Republic (CZE)	5	5	5	15
17	Netherlands (NED)	5	5	2	12
18	China (CHN)	4	10	12	26
19	Great Britain (GBR)	3	10	15	28
20	Czechoslovakia	3	4	1	8
21	Finland (FIN)	1	2	0	3
22	Neutral Paralympic Athletes	1	1	2	4
23	Croatia (CRO)	1	0	0	1
24	Poland (POL)	0	1	9	10
25	Denmark (DEN)	0	1	0	1
25	South Korea (KOR)	0	1	0	1
27	Belgium (BEL)	0	0	2	2
28	Liechtenstein (LIE)	0	0	1	1
28	Yugoslavia	0	0	1	1
Totals (29 entries)		549	539	527	1,615

=== Multiple medalists ===
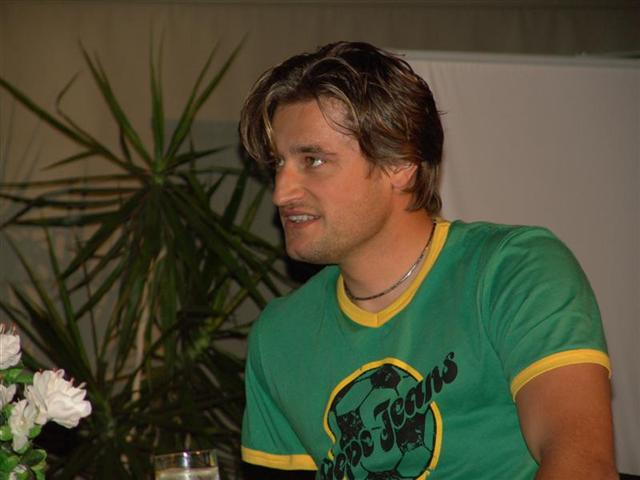
German Gerd Schönfelder is the most decorated alpine skier in the history of the Paralympic Games.

The table shows athletes with either 6 or more gold medals or ten or more total medals.

Athlete	Nation	Paralympics	Gold	Silver	Bronze	Total
Gerd Schönfelder	Germany (GER)	1992–2010	16	4	2	22
Reinhild Moeller	West Germany (FRG) / Germany (GER)	1980–2006	16	2	1	19
Rolf Heinzmann	Switzerland (SUI)	1980–2002	12	2	0	14
Hans Burn	Switzerland (SUI)	1988–2002	6	5	3	14
Sarah Will	United States (USA)	1992–2002	12	1	0	13
Sarah Billmeier	United States (USA)	1992–2002	7	5	1	13
Lana Spreeman	Canada (CAN)	1980–1994	1	6	6	13
Martin Braxenthaler	Germany (GER)	1998–2010	10	1	1	12
Henrieta Farkašová	Slovakia (SVK)	2010–2018	9	2	1	12
Greg Mannino	United States (USA)	1988–1998	6	4	2	12
Chris Waddell	United States (USA)	1992–2002	5	5	2	12
Bruno Oberhammer	Italy (ITA)	1984–1998	3	5	4	12
Markus Pfefferle	West Germany (FRG) / Germany (GER)	1988–2002	1	8	3	12
Bernard Baudean	France (FRA)	1976–1994	6	4	1	11
Michael Milton	Australia (AUS)	1992–2006	6	3	2	11
Alexander Spitz	West Germany (FRG) / Germany (GER)	1984–1994	4	4	3	11
Pascale Casanova	France (FRA)	1998–2006	3	6	2	11
Lauren Woolstencroft	Canada (CAN)	2002–2010	8	1	1	10
Tristan Mouric	France (FRA)	1984–1994	6	3	1	10
Rik Heid	United States (USA)	1988–1994	2	5	3	10
Kuniko Obinata	Japan (JPN)	1998–2010	2	3	5	10
Nancy Gustafson	United States (USA)	1988–1994	7	1	0	8
Josef Meusburger	Austria (AUT)	1976–1988	6	2	0	8
Cato Zahl Pedersen	Norway (NOR)	1980–1994	6	1	0	7
Brian Santos	United States (USA)	1992–1994	6	0	0	6

== See also ==
- Alpine skiing at the Winter Olympics
- Alpine skiing at the Youth Olympic Games
- Alpine skiing World Cup
- FIS Alpine World Ski Championships
- World Para Alpine Skiing Championships
