= 2010 Winter Paralympics medal table =

List of medals won by Paralympic delegations

2010 Winter Paralympics medals
- Location: Vancouver, Canada

Highlights
- Most gold medals: Germany (13)
- Most total medals: Russia (38)
- Medalling NPCs: 21

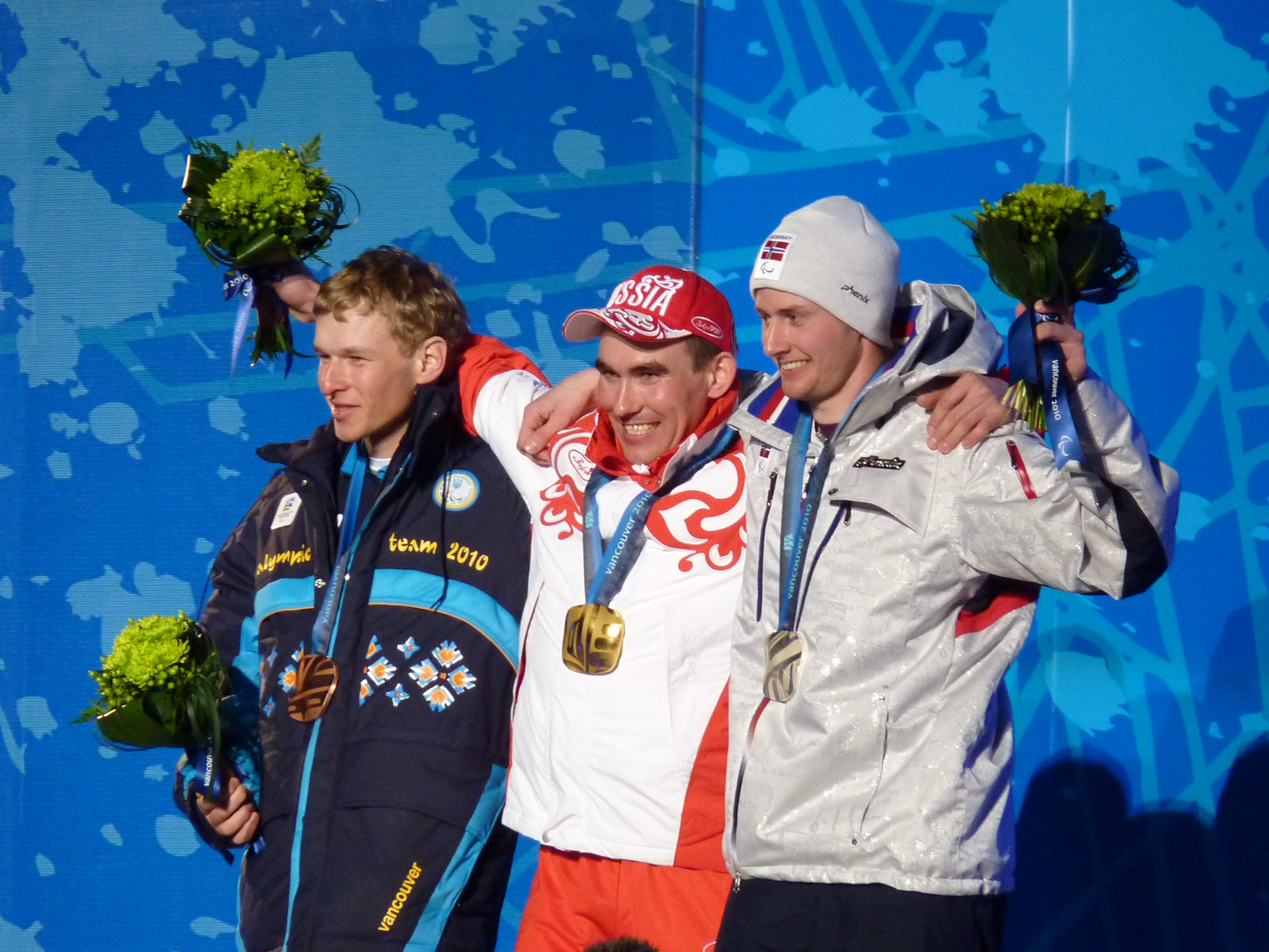
From left to right: Grygorii Vovchynskyi of Ukraine (bronze), Kirill Mikhaylov of Russia (gold), and Nils-Erik Ulset of Norway (silver) with the medals they earned in men's pursuit in biathlon.

The 2010 Winter Paralympics, officially known as the X Paralympic Winter Games, were held in Vancouver, British Columbia, Canada, from March 12 to March 21, 2010. A total of 506 athletes from 44 nations participated in 64 events from five different sport disciplines.

Athletes from 21 countries won at least one medal, 15 of them winning at least one gold medal. For the second consecutive Winter Games, Russia won the most medals in total, with 38. Germany collected the most gold medals, with 13. The most individual gold medals were won by Canadian Lauren Woolstencroft, who secured five in alpine skiing, and German Verena Bentele, with two in biathlon and three in cross-country skiing.

Viviane Forest of Canada became the first Paralympian to win a gold medal in both the Winter and Summer Games when she won the women's downhill event for visually impaired athletes. She had previously won gold medals in the 2000 and 2004 Summer Paralympics for women's goalball.

== Medal table ==
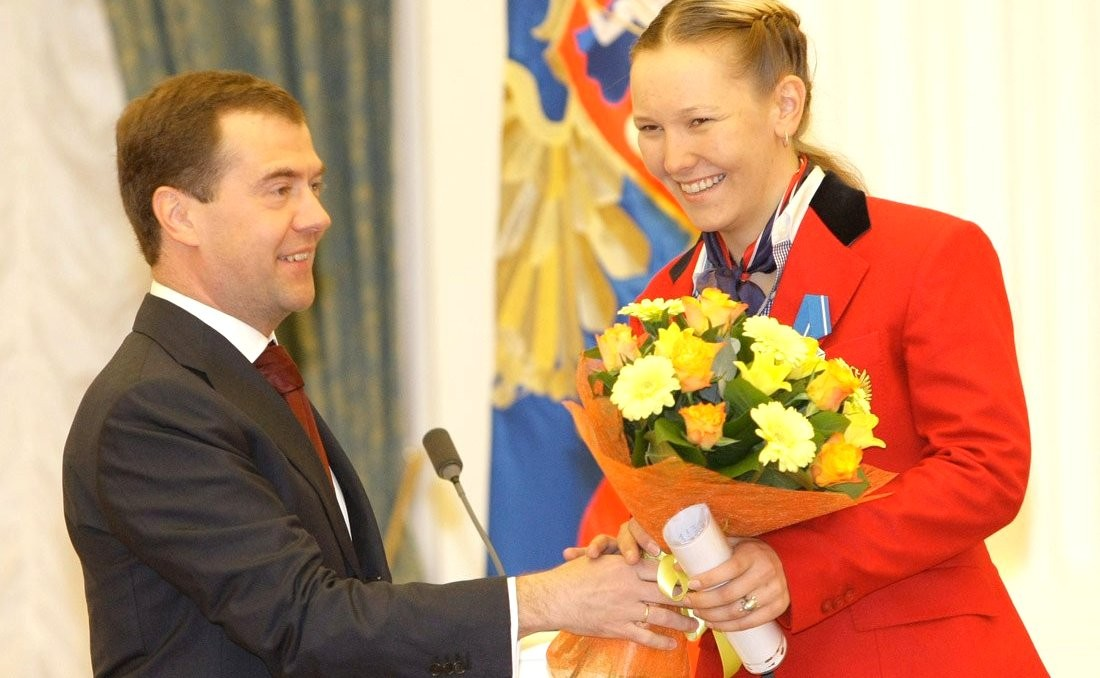
Anna Burmistrova from Russia, awarded the Order of Honour in Russia, for winning two gold, one silver and one bronze in biathlon and cross-country skiing.

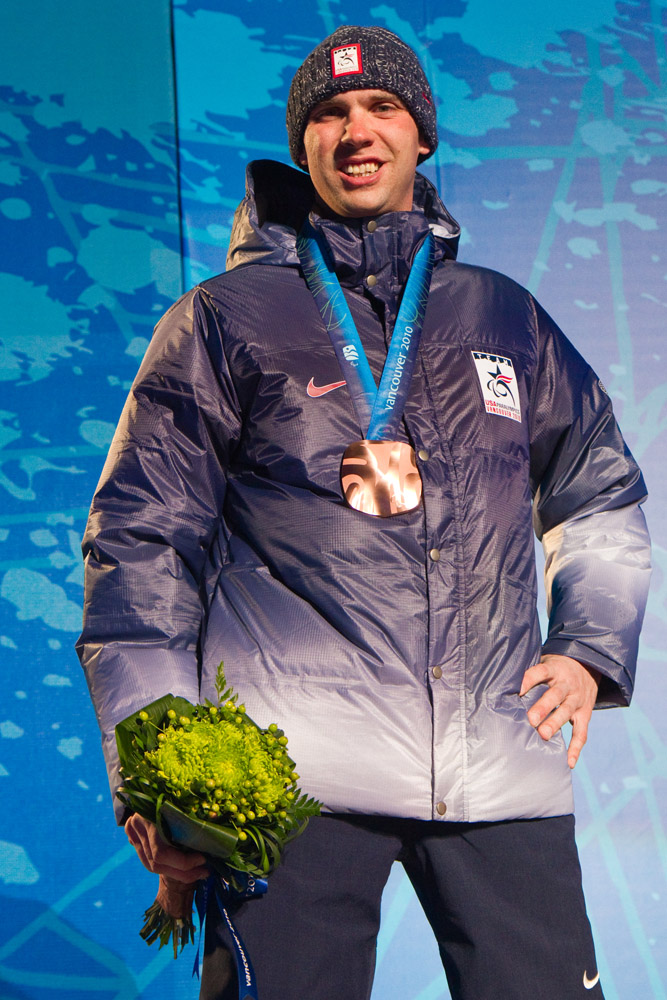
Andy Soule from the United States won a bronze medal in biathlon.

The ranking in this table is based on information provided by the International Paralympic Committee (IPC) and is consistent with IPC convention in its published medal tables. By default, the table is ordered by the number of gold medals the athletes from a nation have won (in this context, a nation is an entity represented by a National Paralympic Committee). The number of silver medals is taken into consideration next and then the number of bronze medals. If nations are still tied, equal ranking is given and they are listed alphabetically by IPC country code.

In the men's downhill standing two silver medals were awarded for a second-place tie. No bronze medal was awarded for that event.

* Host nation (Canada)

Rank	Nation	Gold	Silver	Bronze	Total
1	Germany (GER)	13	5	6	24
2	Russia (RUS)	12	16	10	38
3	Canada (CAN)*	10	5	4	19
4	Slovakia (SVK)	6	2	3	11
5	Ukraine (UKR)	5	8	6	19
6	United States (USA)	4	5	4	13
7	Austria (AUT)	3	4	4	11
8	Japan (JPN)	3	3	5	11
9	Belarus (BLR)	2	0	7	9
10	France (FRA)	1	4	1	6
11	Italy (ITA)	1	3	3	7
12	Norway (NOR)	1	3	2	6
13	Spain (ESP)	1	2	0	3
13	Switzerland (SUI)	1	2	0	3
15	New Zealand (NZL)	1	0	0	1
16	Australia (AUS)	0	1	3	4
17	Finland (FIN)	0	1	1	2
18	South Korea (KOR)	0	1	0	1
19	Sweden (SWE)	0	0	2	2
20	Czech Republic (CZE)	0	0	1	1
20	Poland (POL)	0	0	1	1
Totals (21 entries)		64	65	63	192

== See also ==
- 2010 Winter Olympics medal table
