= Alpine skiing at the 2010 Winter Paralympics – Women's giant slalom =

Women's giant slalom at the X Paralympic Winter Games
- Paralympic alpine skiing
- Venue: Whistler Blackcomb
- Dates: March 16, 2010; March 17, 2010

The women's giant slalom competition of the Vancouver 2010 Paralympics is held at Whistler Blackcomb in Whistler, British Columbia. The competition is scheduled for Tuesday, March 16, and Wednesday, March 17.

== Visually impaired ==
In the giant slalom visually impaired, the athlete with a visual impairment has a sighted guide. The two skiers are considered a team, and dual medals are awarded.

Rank	Bib	Name	Country	Run 1	Rank	Run 2	Rank	Total	Difference
1st place, gold medalist(s)	1	Henrieta Farkasova; Guide: Natalia Subrtova	Slovakia	1:25.44	1	1:31.21	1	2:56.65	
2nd place, silver medalist(s)	2	Sabine Gasteiger; Guide: Stefan Schoner	Austria	1:28.25	2	1:33.93	2	3:02.18	+5.53
3rd place, bronze medalist(s)	4	Viviane Forest; Guide: Lindsay Debou	Canada	1:35.03	4	1:36.14	4	3:11.17	+14.52
4	11	Kelly Gallagher; Guide: Claire Robb	Great Britain	1:38.65	8	1:35.88	3	3:14.53	+17.88
5	3	Anna Cohi Fornell; Guide: Raquel Garcia Borreguero	Spain	1:37.12	5	1:38.54	5	3:15.66	+19.01
6	7	Caitlin Sarubbi; Guide: Gwynn Watkins	United States	1:44.57	10	1:39.05	6	3:23.62	+27.97
7	12	Jessica Gallagher; Guide: Eric Bickerton	Australia	1:41.24	9	1:43.40	7	3:24.64	+28.99
8	5	Danelle Umstead; Guide: Rob Umstead	United States	1:37.90	7	2:03.74	8	3:41.64	+45.99
9	13	Paquita Ramirez Capitan; Guide: Manel Fernandez Flores	Andorra	2:06.63	11	2:10.33	9	4:16.96	+1:21.31
	15	Melissa Perrine; Guide: Andrew Bor	Australia	1:37.57	6	DNF			
	8	Nadja Baumgartner; Guide: Chiarina Sawyer	Switzerland	1:33.49	3	DSQ			
	14	Nikolina Santek; Guide: Vjeran Svaic	Croatia	DNS					
	9	Natasha de Troyer; Guide: Diego van der Voorde	Belgium	DNF					
	6	Alexandra Frantseva; Guide: Polina Popova	Russia	DSQ					
	10	Anna Kuliskova; Guide: Michaela Hubacova	Czech Republic	DSQ					

== Sitting ==
Rank	Bib	Name	Country	Run 1	Rank	Run 2	Rank	Total	Difference
1st place, gold medalist(s)	10	Alana Nichols	United States	1:28.04	1	1:29.53	1	2:57.57	
2nd place, silver medalist(s)	8	Stephani Victor	United States	1:29.49	2	1:32.29	3	3:01.78	+4.21
3rd place, bronze medalist(s)	6	Kuniko Obinata	Japan	1:34.75	5	1:33.96	4	3:08.71	+11.14
4	1	Tatsuko Aoki	Japan	1:33.19	3	1:35.61	6	3:08.80	+11.23
5	5	Laurie Stephens	United States	1:34.56	4	1:34.60	5	3:09.16	+11.59
6	7	Ricci Kilgore	United States	1:40.47	9	1:36.97	7	3:17.44	+19.87
7	3	Anna Schaffelhuber	Germany	1:36.13	6	1:44.16	8	3:20.29	+22.72
8	2	Claudia Lösch	Austria	1:51.57	12	1:31.56	2	3:23.13	+25.56
9	13	Luba Lowery	United States	1:41.06	10	1:45.24	9	3:26.30	+28.73
10	4	Anita Fuhrer	Switzerland	1:46.56	11	1:53.82	10	3:40.38	+42.81
	12	Anna Turney	Great Britain	1:38.28	7	DNF			
	14	Linnea Ottosson Eide	Sweden	1:40.39	8	DNF			
	15	Erna Fridriksdottir	Iceland	2:00.62	13	DNF			
	9	Yoshiko Tanaka	Japan	DNS					
	11	Jane Sowerby	Great Britain	DSQ					

== Standing ==
Rank	Bib	Name	Country	Run 1	Rank	Run 2	Rank	Total	Difference
1st place, gold medalist(s)	5	Lauren Woolstencroft	Canada	1:15.62	1	1:18.41	1	2:34.03	
2nd place, silver medalist(s)	10	Andrea Rothfuss	Germany	1:21.18	3	1:20.42	2	2:41.60	+7.57
3rd place, bronze medalist(s)	11	Petra Smarzova	Slovakia	1:20.73	2	1:20.90	3	2:41.63	+7.60
4	2	Karolina Wisniewska	Canada	1:21.95	4	1:22.08	4	2:44.03	+10.00
5	14	Iveta Chlebakova	Slovakia	1:22.45	5	1:22.60	6	2:45.05	+11.02
6	1	Solène Jambaqué	France	1:23.41	8	1:22.52	5	2:45.93	+11.90
7	4	Marie Bochet	France	1:22.70	6	1:24.07	7	2:46.77	+12.74
8	12	Melania Corradini	Italy	1:23.73	9	1:24.55	8	2:48.28	+14.25
9	8	Allison Jones	United States	1:23.07	7	1:29.19	11	2:52.26	+18.23
10	3	Marina Perterer	Austria	1:27.32	10	1:26.69	10	2:54.01	+19.98
11	13	Arly Fogarty	Canada	1:28.90	12	1:26.68	13	2:55.58	+21.55
12	15	Melanie Schwartz	Canada	1:30.42	13	1:29.05	12	2:59.47	+25.44
13	21	Elena Kudyakova	Russia	1:31.24	14	1:28.32	9	2:59.56	+25.53
14	22	Laura Valeanu	Romania	1:35.21	15	1:30.83	14	3:06.04	+32.01
15	18	Hannah Pennington	United States	1:40.82	16	1:37.58	15	3:18.40	+44.37
16	23	Paraskevi Christodoulopoulou	Greece	2:32.76	17	2:19.78	16	4:52.54	+2:18.51
	17	Karin Fasel	Switzerland	1:27.72	11	DNF			
	6	Inga Medvedeva	Russia	DNF					
	7	Nathalie Tyack	France	DNF					
	16	Elitsa Storey	United States	DNF					
	20	Katja Saarinen	Finland	DNF					
	19	Ursula Pueyo Marimon	Spain	DSQ					
	24	Gayane Usnyan	Armenia	DSQ					
	9	Andrea Dziewior	Canada	DNS					

== See also ==
- Alpine skiing at the 2010 Winter Olympics – Women's giant slalom
