= Alpine skiing at the 2010 Winter Paralympics – Men's giant slalom =

Men's Giant Slalom at the X Paralympic Winter Games
- Paralympic alpine skiing
- Venue: Whistler Blackcomb
- Dates: March 16, 2010; March 17, 2010

The Men's Giant Slalom competition of the Vancouver 2010 Paralympics is held at Whistler Blackcomb in Whistler, British Columbia. The competition is scheduled for Tuesday, March 16 and Wednesday March 17.

== Visually impaired ==
In the downhill visually impaired, the athlete with a visual impairment has a sighted guide. The two skiers are considered a team, and dual medals are awarded.

Rank	Bib	Name	Country	Run 1	Rank	Run 2	Rank	Total	Difference
1st place, gold medalist(s)	15	Jakub Krako; Guide: Juraj Medera	Slovakia	1:19.37	1	1:22.62	3	2:41.99	
2nd place, silver medalist(s)	13	Jon Santacana Maiztegui; Guide: Miguel Galindo Garces	Spain	1:19.77	2	1:22.43	1	2:42.20	+0.21
3rd place, bronze medalist(s)	10	Gianmaria dal Maistro; Guide: Tommaso Balasso	Italy	1:21.72	4	1:22.53	2	2:44.25	+2.26
4	12	Chris Williamson; Guide: Nick Brush	Canada	1:21.81	5	1:22.84	4	2:44.65	+2.66
5	1	Norbert Holik; Guide: Lubos Bosela	Slovakia	1:23.09	7	1:27.73	7	2:50.82	+8.83
6	9	Radomir Dudas; Guide: Maros Hudik	Slovakia	1:24.43	9	1:26.85	5	2:51.28	+9.29
7	3	Ivan Frantsev; Guide: Valentina Morozova	Russia	1:24.60	10	1:27.13	6	2:51.73	+9.74
8	5	Miroslav Haraus; Guide: Martin Makovnik	Slovakia	1:22.08	6	1:33.54	10	2:55.62	+13.63
9	16	Maciej Krezel; Guide: Anna Ogarzynska	Poland	1:28.69	13	1:28.97	8	2:57.66	+15.67
10	6	Gabriel Gorce Yepes; Guide: Felix Aznar Ruiz de Alegria	Spain	1:28.18	11	1:33.51	9	3:01.69	+19.70
11	18	Valery Redkozubov; Guide: Viacheslav Molodtsov	Russia	1:30.92	15	1:35.06	11	3:05.98	+23.99
12	2	Andres Boira Diaz; Guide: Aleix Sune Segala	Spain	1:32.19	16	1:36.61	12	3:08.80	+26.81
13	19	Alexander Fedoruk; Guide: Vadim Makarov	Russia	1:51.10	18	1:58.62	13	3:49.72	+1:07.73
	4	Marek Kubacka; Guide: Jozef Cirbus	Slovakia	1:23.55	8	DNF			
	7	Nicolas Berejny; Guide: Sophie Troc	France	1:19.87	3	DNF			
	8	Christoph Prettner; Guide: Kurt Wastian	Austria	1:28.45	12	DNF			
	14	Anthony Chalencon; Guide: Celine Dole	France	1:34.61	17	DSQ			
	17	Bart Bunting; Guide: Nathan Chivers	Australia	1:28.85	14	DNS			
	11	Mark Bathum; Guide: Slater Storey	United States	DNF					

== Sitting ==
Rank	Bib	Name	Country	Run 1	Rank	Run 2	Rank	Total	Difference
1st place, gold medalist(s)	6	Martin Braxenthaler	Germany	1:18.23	2	1:19.17	1	2:37.40	
2nd place, silver medalist(s)	7	Christoph Kunz	Switzerland	1:17.81	1	1:22.54	2	2:40.35	+2.95
3rd place, bronze medalist(s)	3	Takeshi Suzuki	Japan	1:21.65	3	1:23.96	4	2:45.61	+8.21
4	16	Cyril More	France	1:23.36	7	1:23.49	3	2:46.85	+9.45
5	14	Jürgen Egle	Austria	1:22.35	4	1:26.22	8	2:48.57	+11.17
6	5	Shannon Dallas	Australia	1:23.10	6	1:26.42	9	2:49.52	+12.12
7	12	Taiki Morii	Japan	1:24.39	10	1:25.15	5	2:49.54	+12.14
8	19	Robert Frohle	Austria	1:23.10	5	1:26.75	10	2:49.83	+12.43
9	4	Yohann Taberlet	France	1:23.63	8	1:27.02	11	2:50.65	+13.25
10	15	Philipp Bonadimann	Austria	1:24.70	11	1:26.12	7	2:50.82	+13.42
11	21	Akira Taniguchi	Japan	1:24.08	9	1:28.05	12	2:52.13	+14.73
12	23	Hans Pleisch	Switzerland	1:25.72	15	1:28.14	13	2:53.86	+16.46
13	20	Thomas Nolte	Germany	1:25.25	13	1:29.19	14	2:54.44	+17.04
14	24	Carl Burnett	United States	1:27.05	16	1:29.40	15	2:56.45	+19.05
15	28	Talan Skeels-Piggins	Great Britain	1:29.68	20	1:31.48	16	3:01.16	+23.76
16	10	Tyler Walker	United States	1:27.07	17	1:35.49	18	3:02.56	+25.16
17	25	Kees-Jan van der Klooster	Netherlands	1:31.03	23	1:36.08	19	3:07.11	+29.71
18	35	Hwan-Kyung Lee	South Korea	1:30.63	21	1:36.53	20	3:07.16	+29.76
19	2	Jean-Yves le Meur	France	1:44.01	31	1:25.85	6	3:09.86	+32.46
20	31	Peter Williams	New Zealand	1:34.16	27	1:37.70	22	3:11.86	+34.46
21	30	Takanori Yokosawa	Japan	1:35.99	28	1:37.49	21	3:13.48	+36.08
22	38	Enrico Giorge	Italy	1:40.74	30	1:35.12	17	3:15.86	+38.46
23	26	Nicholas Catanzarite	United States	1:50.92	34	1:46.76	23	3:37.68	+1:00.28
24	45	Xavi Fernandez Vazquez	Andorra	1:48.61	33	1:51.55	25	3:40.16	+1:02.76
25	48	Leonardo Martinez	Argentina	1:51.49	35	1:51.12	24	3:42.61	+1:05.21
26	49	Arly Velasquez Penaloza	Mexico	1:45.67	32	2:12.88	26	3:58.55	+1:21.15
27	47	Juan Ruiz Hernandez	Mexico	2:27.02	36	3:00.10	27	5:27.12	+2:49.72
	13	Christopher Devlin-Young	United States	1:24.96	12	DNF			
	29	Gerald Hayden	United States	1:27.32	18	DNF			
	41	Radim Kozlovsky	Czech Republic	1:33.40	25	DNF			
	43	Oldrich Jelinek	Czech Republic	1:33.73	26	DNF			
	51	Juan Ignacio Maggi	Argentina	4:04.38	37	DNF			
	9	Sean Rose	Great Britain	1:25.52	14	DSQ			
	27	Timothy Farr	Great Britain	1:29.22	19	DSQ			
	40	Jaroslaw Rola	Poland	1:30.80	22	DSQ			
	33	Jasmin Bambur	Serbia	1:31.16	24	DSQ			
	22	Dietmar Dorn	Austria	1:40.12	29	DNS			
	1	Nicolas Loussalez-Artets	France	DNF					
	8	Sang-Min Han	South Korea	DNF					
	11	Akira Kano	Japan	DNF					
	17	Jong-Seork Park	South Korea	DNF					
	18	Andreas Kapfinger	Austria	DNF					
	32	Michael Stampfer	Italy	DNF					
	34	Petter Ledin	Sweden	DNF					
	36	Russell Docker	Great Britain	DNF					
	37	Franz Hanfstingl	Germany	DNF					
	39	Gal Jakic	Slovenia	DNF					
	50	Tomas del Villar	Chile	DNF					
	44	Simon Jacobsen	Sweden	DNF					
	42	Rafal Szumiec	Poland	DSQ					
	46	Dino Sokolovic	Croatia	DSQ					

== Standing ==
Rank	Bib	Name	Country	Run 1	Rank	Run 2	Rank	Total	Difference
1st place, gold medalist(s)	1	Gerd Schonfelder	Germany	1:11.80	1			2:23.92	
2nd place, silver medalist(s)	13	Robert Meusburger	Austria	1:13.58	4			2:26.08	
3rd place, bronze medalist(s)	7	Vincent Gauthier-Manuel	France	1:12.88	2			2:26.33	
4	5	Hubert Mandl	Austria	1:13.56	3			2:27.22	
5	6	Lionel Brun	France	1:13.78	6			2:27.43	
6	2	Cameron Rahles-Rahbula	Australia	1:13.73	5			2:29.07	
7	4	Thomas Pfyl	Switzerland	1:15.41	9			2:29.08	
8	12	Michael Brugger	Switzerland	1:14.22	7			2:29.19	
9	14	Hiraku Misawa	Japan	1:15.66	11			2:30.65	
10	11	Toby Kane	Australia	1:15.50	10			2:31.03	
11	20	Manfred Auer	Austria	1:15.30	8			2:32.66	
12	8	Mitchell Gourley	Australia	1:15.76	12			2:33.03	
13	27	Stanislav Loska	Czech Republic	1:16.02	13			2:33.28	
14	10	Cedric Amafroi-Broisat	France	1:16.32	15			2:33.48	
15	16	Martin France	Slovakia	1:16.18	14			2:33.67	
16	17	Bradley Washburn	United States	1:16.97	17			2:34.85	
17	15	Alexandr Alyabyev	Russia	1:16.91	16			2:36.14	
T18	35	Martin Cupka	Slovakia	1:17.61	18			2:38.18	
T18	25	Jeff Dickson	Canada	1:18.73	19			2:38.18	
20	19	Shinji Inoue	Japan	1:19.45	21			2:38.79	
21	21	Morgan Perrin	Canada	1:19.22	20			2:39.46	
22	31	Martin Falch	Austria	1:21.44	24			2:40.39	
23	32	Hansjoerg Lantschner	Italy	1:20.42	23			2:41.21	
24	30	Laurent Caul-Futy	France	1:20.26	22			2:41.97	
T25	33	Kirk Schornstein	Canada	1:22.11	25			2:45.38	
T25	34	Andrzej Szczesny	Poland	1:23.36	27			2:45.38	
27	29	George Sansonetis	United States	1:22.94	26			2:45.42	
28	49	John Whitney	United States	1:23.67	29			2:47.17	
29	40	Ralph Green	United States	1:23.97	30			2:48.96	
30	36	Michal Klos	Poland	1:24.29	31			2:50.02	
31	39	David Warner	South Africa	1:26.04	32			2:52.09	
32	37	Ian Jansing	United States	1:23.49	28			2:52.79	
33	28	Zlatko Pesjak	Croatia	1:28.75	33			2:57.67	
34	42	Balazs Koleszar	Hungary	1:29.28	34			2:57.87	
35	41	Nicholas Watts	Australia	1:35.29	35			3:23.77	
36	44	Mario Dadic	Croatia	1:40.72	36			3:25.37	
37	43	Ievgen Kravitz	Ukraine	1:46.67	37			3:30.35	
38	47	Jorge Migueles	Chile	1:47.52	38			3:34.98	
39	46	Nijaz Memic	Bosnia and Herzegovina	1:48.37	39			3:43.05	
40	45	Ioannis Papavasileiou	Greece	2:03.38	40			4:10.19	
	3	Markus Salcher	Austria	DNF					
	9	Romain Riboud	France	DNF					
	18	Gakuta Koike	Japan	DNF					
	22	Marty Mayberry	Australia	DNF					
	24	Micha Josi	Switzerland	DNF					
	26	Kevin Wermeester	Germany	DNF					
	38	Christian Lanthaler	Italy	DNF					
	48	Mher Avanesyan	Armenia	DNF					
	50	Sadegh Kalhor	Iran	DNF					
	23	Matt Hallat	Canada	DNS					

== See also ==
- Alpine skiing at the 2010 Winter Olympics – Men's downhill
