= United States at the 2010 Winter Paralympics =

- Flag of the United States
- IPC code: USA
- NPC: United States Paralympic Committee
- Website: www.teamusa.org/US-Paralympics

in Vancouver
- Competitors: 50 in 5 sports
- Flag bearers: Heath Calhoun (opening); Monte Meier (closing)
- Medals Ranked 6th: Gold 4 Silver 5 Bronze 4 Total 13

Winter Paralympics appearances (overview)
- 1976; 1980; 1984; 1988; 1992; 1994; 1998; 2002; 2006; 2010; 2014; 2018; 2022; 2026

The United States sent a delegation to compete at the 2010 Winter Paralympics in Vancouver, British Columbia, Canada. A total of 50 U.S. competitors took part in all five sports. The American delegation included five former members of the U.S. military, including a veteran of the Iraq War (Heath Calhoun) and a veteran of the War in Afghanistan (Andy Soule).

The United States finished sixth in the gold medal and fifth in the total medal count. U.S. coverage of the 2010 Paralympic Games was provided primarily by the Universal Sports Television Network.

== Disability classifications ==
Every participant at the Paralympics had their disability grouped into one of five disability categories; amputation, the condition may be congenital or sustained through injury or illness; cerebral palsy; wheelchair athletes, there is often overlap between this and other categories; visual impairment, including blindness; Les autres, any physical disability that does not fall strictly under one of the other categories, for example dwarfism or multiple sclerosis. Each Paralympic sport then had its own classifications, dependent upon the specific physical demands of competition. Events were given a code, made of numbers and letters, describing the type of event and classification of the athletes competing. Events with "B" in the code were for athletes with visual impairment, codes LW1 to LW9 were for athletes who stood to compete, and LW10 to LW12 were for athletes who competed sitting down. In biathlon events, which contained a target shooting component, blind and visually impaired athletes were able to compete through the use of acoustic signals, whose signal intensity varied dependent upon whether or not the athlete was on target.

== Medalists ==
The following American athletes won medals at the games; all dates are for March 2010. In the 'by discipline' sections below, medalists' names are in bold.

Medal	Name	Sport	Event	Date
Gold	Alana Nichols	Alpine skiing	Women's downhill, sitting	March 18
Gold	Alana Nichols	Alpine skiing	Women's giant slalom, sitting	March 16
Gold	Stephani Victor	Alpine skiing	Women's super combined, sitting	March 20
Gold	United States national ice sledge hockey team: Mike Blabac; Steve Cash; Taylor Chace; Jimmy Connelly; Brad Emmerson; Joseph Howard; Tim Jones; Nikko Landeros; Taylor Lipsett; Adam Page; Josh Pauls; Alexi Salamone; Greg Shaw; Bubba Torres; Andy Yohe	Ice sledge hockey	Ice sledge hockey	March 20
Silver	Mark Bathum; Guide: Slater Storey	Alpine skiing	Men's downhill, visually impaired	March 18
Silver	Alana Nichols	Alpine skiing	Women's super-G, sitting	March 19
Silver	Laurie Stephens	Alpine skiing	Women's downhill, sitting	March 18
Silver	Stephani Victor	Alpine skiing	Women's slalom, sitting	March 14
Silver	Stephani Victor	Alpine skiing	Women's giant slalom, sitting	March 16
Bronze	Alana Nichols	Alpine skiing	Women's super combined, sitting	March 20
Bronze	Danelle Umstead	Alpine skiing	Women's downhill, visually impaired	March 18
Bronze	Danelle Umstead; Guide: Rob Umstead	Alpine skiing	Women's super combined, visually impaired	March 20
Bronze	Andy Soule	Biathlon	Men's 2.4 km pursuit, sitting	March 13

**Medals by sport**
**Sport**	Gold medal	Silver medal	Bronze medal	**Total**
Alpine skiing	3	5	3	11
Biathlon	0	0	1	1
Cross-country skiing	0	0	0	0
Ice sledge hockey	1	0	0	1
Wheelchair curling	0	0	0	0

**Multiple medalists**
**Name**	**Sport**	Gold medal	Silver medal	Bronze medal	**Total**
Alana Nichols	Alpine skiing	2	1	1	4
Stephani Victor	Alpine skiing	1	2	0	3
Danelle Umstead	Alpine skiing	0	0	2	2

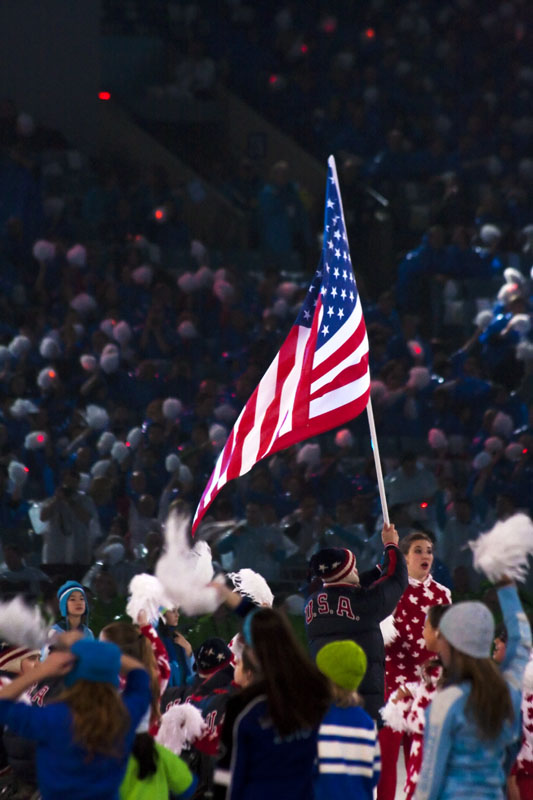
Heath Calhoun carrying the U.S. flag at the Opening Ceremony of the 2010 Winter Paralympics in Vancouver, British Columbia, Canada on March 12, 2010

== Alpine skiing ==
On February 26, 2010, U.S. Paralympics nominated a team of 14 men and 10 women (plus three guides) to compete in alpine skiing.

Men

Athlete	Event	Class	Run 1		Run 2		Final/Total	
Athlete	Event	Class	Time	Rank	Time	Rank	Time	Rank
Mark Bathum; Guide: Slater Storey	Downhill, visually impaired	B 3	N/A				1:18.63	2nd place, silver medalist(s)
Mark Bathum; Guide: Slater Storey	Giant slalom, visually impaired	B 3	Disqualified		--			
Mark Bathum; Guide: Slater Storey	Slalom, visually impaired	B 3	53.04	9	1:17.41	11	2:10.45	11
Mark Bathum; Guide: Slater Storey	Super combined, visually impaired	B 3	Super-G; Did not finish		--			
Mark Bathum; Guide: Slater Storey	Super-G, visually impaired	B 3	N/A				1:23.05	4
Carl Burnett	Giant slalom, sitting	LW 11	1:27.05	16	1:29.40	15	2:56.45	14
Carl Burnett	Slalom, sitting	LW 11	53.99	18	59.28	9	1:53.27	9
Carl Burnett	Super combined, sitting	LW 11	Super-G; 1:37.95	15	Slalom; 53.10	8	2:31.05	12
Carl Burnett	Super-G, sitting	LW 11	N/A				did not finish	
Heath Calhoun	Slalom, sitting	LW 12–2	did not finish		--			
Heath Calhoun	Super-G, sitting	LW 12–2	N/A				1:24.77	8
Heath Calhoun	Super combined, sitting	LW 12–2	Super-G; 1:23.66	4	Slalom; 55.33	11	2:18.99	10
Nicholas Catanzarite	Giant slalom, sitting	LW 10–1	1:50.92	34	1:46.76	23	3:37.68	23
Nicholas Catanzarite	Super-G, sitting	LW 10–1	N/A				did not finish	
Christopher Devlin-Young	Downhill, sitting	LW 12–1	N/A				1:22.65	13
Christopher Devlin-Young	Giant slalom, sitting	LW 12–1	1:24.96	12	did not finish		--	
Christopher Devlin-Young	Slalom, sitting	LW 12–1	54.05	19	did not finish		--	
Christopher Devlin-Young	Super combined, sitting	LW 12–1	Super-G; 1:24.01	6	Slalom; 52.70	7	2:16.71	7
Christopher Devlin-Young	Super-G, sitting	LW 12–1	N/A				1:21.00	4
Ralph Green	Giant slalom, standing	LW 2	1:23.97	30	1:24.99	29	2:48.96	29
Ralph Green	Slalom, standing	LW 2	58.11	22	58.67	24	1:56.78	22
Ralph Green	Super-G, standing	LW 2	N/A				Disqualified	
Gerald Hayden	Giant slalom, sitting	LW 12–1	1:27.32	18	did not finish		--	
Gerald Hayden	Slalom, sitting	LW 12–1	50.61	8	1:06.43	22	1:57.04	16
Ian Jansing	Giant slalom, standing	LW 9–2	1:23.49	28	1:29.30	34	2:52.79	32
Monte Meier	Downhill, standing	LW 2	N/A				1:28.48	22
Monte Meier	Slalom, standing	LW 2	55.31	10	53.98	4	1:49.29	8
Monte Meier	Super combined, standing	LW 2	Super-G; 1:33.07	16	Slalom; 51.13	7	2:24.20	14
Monte Meier	Super-G, standing	LW 2	N/A				1:31.91	27
George Sansonetis	Downhill, standing	LW 9–2	N/A				1:28.47	21
George Sansonetis	Giant slalom, standing	LW 9–2	1:22.94	26	1:22.48	26	2:45.42	27
George Sansonetis	Slalom, standing	LW 9–2	Disqualified		--			
George Sansonetis	Super-G, standing	LW 9–2	N/A				1:35.74	31
Joseph Tompkins	Downhill, sitting	LW 11	N/A				did not finish	
Tyler Walker	Downhill, sitting	LW 12–1	N/A				did not finish	
Tyler Walker	Giant slalom, sitting	LW 12–1	1:27.07	17	1:35.49	18	3:02.56	16
Tyler Walker	Slalom, sitting	LW 12–1	53.24	14	1:00.10	13	1:53.34	10
Tyler Walker	Super-G, sitting	LW 12–1	N/A				1:29.28	22
Bradley Washburn	Downhill, standing	LW 4	N/A				1:26.40	14
Bradley Washburn	Giant slalom, standing	LW 4	1:16.97	17	1:17.88	16	2:34.85	16
Bradley Washburn	Slalom, standing	LW 4	54.82	8	54.79	10	1:49.61	9
Bradley Washburn	Super-G, standing	LW 4	N/A				1:27.93	17
John Whitney	Giant slalom, standing	LW 2	1:23.67	29	1:23.50	28	2:47.17	28
John Whitney	Slalom, standing	LW 2	59.61	27	57.68	22	1:57.29	23
John Whitney	Super-G, standing	LW 2	N/A				1:32.97	28

Women

Athlete	Event	Class	Run 1		Run 2		Final/Total	
Athlete	Event	Class	Time	Rank	Time	Rank	Time	Rank
Allison Jones	Downhill, standing	LW 2	N/A				1:32.32	6
Allison Jones	Giant slalom, standing	LW 2	1:23.07	7	1:29.19	13	2:52.26	9
Allison Jones	Slalom, standing	LW 2	1:01.12	7	1:00.07	4	2:01.19	5
Allison Jones	Super combined, standing	LW 2	Super-G; 1:38.07	8	Slalom; 58.66	2	2:36.73	5
Allison Jones	Super-G, standing	LW 2	N/A				1:38.84	9
Ricci Kilgore	Giant slalom, sitting	LW 12–1	1:40.47	9	1:36.97	7	3:17.44	6
Ricci Kilgore	Slalom, sitting	LW 12–1	1:18.64	8	Disqualified		--	
Luba Lowery	Giant slalom, sitting	LW 12–2	1:41.06	10	1:45.24	9	3:26.30	9
Luba Lowery	Slalom, sitting	LW 12–2	1:20.48	9	1:23.01	8	2:43.49	7
Alana Nichols	Downhill, sitting	LW 11	N/A				1:23.31	1st place, gold medalist(s)
Alana Nichols	Giant slalom, sitting	LW 11	1:28.04	1	1:29.53	1	2:57.57	1st place, gold medalist(s)
Alana Nichols	Slalom, sitting	LW 11	1:31.07	11	1:15.34	5	2:46.41	8
Alana Nichols	Super combined, sitting	LW 11	Super-G; 1:40.58	2	Slalom; 1:06.96	5	2:47.54	3rd place, bronze medalist(s)
Alana Nichols	Super-G, sitting	LW 11	N/A				1:36.68	2nd place, silver medalist(s)
Hannah Pennington	Giant slalom, standing	LW 3–2	1:40.82	16	1:37.58	15	3:18.40	15
Hannah Pennington	Slalom, standing	LW 3–2	1:12.93	17	1:11.31	16	2:24.24	16
Caitlyn Sarubbi; Guide: Gwynn Watkins	Downhill, visually impaired	B 3	N/A				did not finish	
Caitlyn Sarubbi; Guide: Gwynn Watkins	Giant slalom, visually impaired	B 3	Super-G; 1:44.57	10	Slalom; 1:39.05	6	3:23.62	6
Caitlyn Sarubbi; Guide: Gwynn Watkins	Slalom, visually impaired	B 3	1:05.10	7	did not finish		–	
Caitlyn Sarubbi; Guide: Gwynn Watkins	Super combined, visually impaired	B 3	1:57.53	6	1:04.49	4	3:02.02	6
Caitlyn Sarubbi; Guide: Gwynn Watkins	Super-G, visually impaired	B 3	N/A				1:50.33	8
Laurie Stephens	Downhill, sitting	LW 12–1	N/A				1:28.26	2nd place, silver medalist(s)
Laurie Stephens	Giant slalom, sitting	LW 12–1	1:34.56	4	1:34.60	5	3:09.16	5
Laurie Stephens	Slalom, sitting	LW 12–1	1:09.96	6	1:18.93	6	2:28.89	5
Laurie Stephens	Super combined, sitting	LW 12–1	Super-G; 1:46.79	5	Slalom; 1:06.22	3	2:53.01	5
Laurie Stephens	Super-G, sitting	LW 12–1	N/A				1:38.38	4
Elitsa Storey	Downhill, standing	LW 2	N/A				did not start	
Elitsa Storey	Giant slalom, standing	LW 2	did not finish		--			
Elitsa Storey	Slalom, standing	LW 2	1:09.76	15	did not start		--	
Danelle Umstead; Guide: Rob Umstead	Downhill, visually impaired	B 2	N/A				1:30.18	3rd place, bronze medalist(s)
Danelle Umstead; Guide: Rob Umstead	Giant slalom, visually impaired	B 2	1:37.90	7	2:03.74	8	3:41.64	8
Danelle Umstead; Guide: Rob Umstead	Slalom, visually Impaired	B 2	did not finish		--			
Danelle Umstead; Guide: Rob Umstead	Super combined, visually impaired	B 2	Super-G; 1:41.70	3	Slalom; 1:07.05	6	2:48.75	3rd place, bronze medalist(s)
Danelle Umstead; Guide: Rob Umstead	Super-G, visually impaired	B 2	N/A				1:40.62	4
Stephani Victor	Downhill, sitting	LW 12–2	N/A				1:36.99	4
Stephani Victor	Giant slalom, sitting	LW 12–2	1:29.49	2	1:32.29	3	3:01.78	2nd place, silver medalist(s)
Stephani Victor	Slalom, sitting	LW 12–2	1:04.57	1	1:08.06	2	2:12.63	2nd place, silver medalist(s)
Stephani Victor	Super combined, sitting	LW 12–2	Super-G; 1:38.46	1	Slalom; 1:02.25	1	2:40.71	1st place, gold medalist(s)
Stephani Victor	Super-G, sitting	LW 12–2	N/A				1:40.36	6

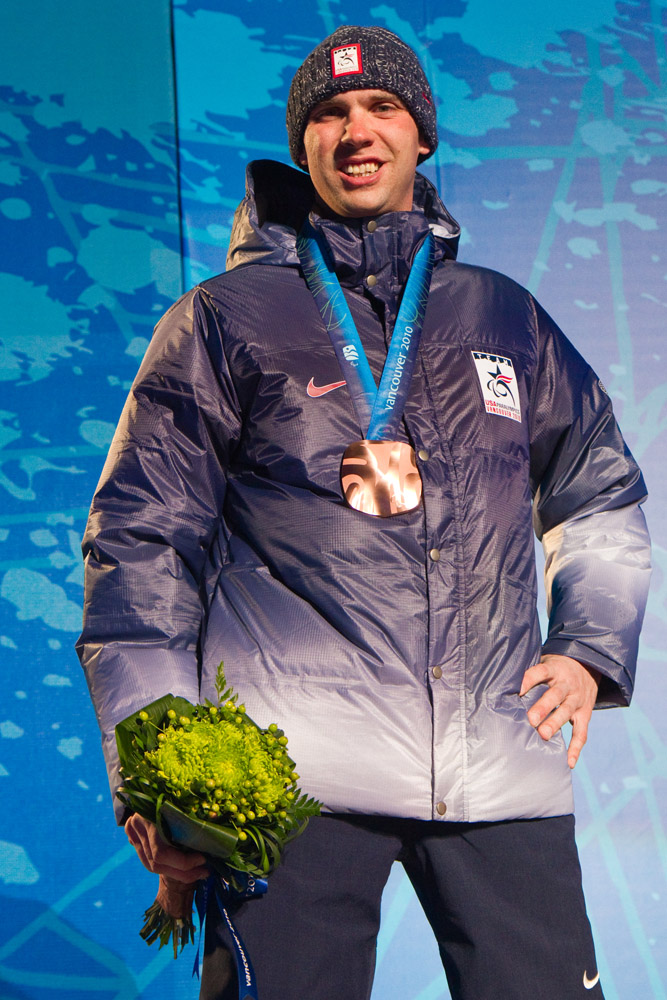
Andy Soule, wins bronze in biathlon, Men's 2.4 km Pursuit.

== Biathlon ==
Two U.S. competitors participated in the biathlon. Both are also members of the U.S. cross-country skiing team. Andy Soule, a veteran of the War in Afghanistan, won the bronze medal in men's 2.4 km sitting pursuit on the opening day of the Paralympics, becoming the first American to win a biathlon medal in the either the Olympic or the Paralympic Winter Games.

Athlete	Events	Class	Factor %	Qualification				Final			
Athlete	Events	Class	Factor %	Calculated time	Missed shots	Result	Rank	Calculated time	Missed shots	Result	Rank
Andy Soule	Men's 2.4 km Pursuit, sitting	LW12	100	8:38.48	0+0	8:38.48	3 Q		1+0	10:53.01	3rd place, bronze medalist(s)
Andy Soule	Men's 12.4 km, sitting	LW12	100	N/A				44:26.2	0+0+0+0	44:26.2	4
Kelly Underkofler	Women's 3km Pursuit, standing	LW8	97	11:40.43	1+0	12:00.43	8 Q		1+0	14:39.00	9
Kelly Underkofler	Women's 12.5 km, standing	LW8	97	N/A				49:44.1	1+1+0+0	51:44.1	9

== Cross-country skiing ==
The cross-country skiing team consists of four men and two women. Two of the skiers, Andy Soule and Kelly Underkofler, will also be competing in the biathlon.

Calculated time

To ensure a fair event when athletes with differing disabilities compete, times achieved were sometimes modified by a percentage rate, to produce a result known as "Calculated Time". It is this time that decided the result of the races, and is listed below. Where this differs from the real time recorded, real time is also listed.

Men

Athlete	Events	Class	Factor %	Qualification		Semifinal		Final	
Athlete	Events	Class	Factor %	Time	Rank	Time	Rank	Time	Rank
Sean Halsted	1 km sprint sitting	LW11.5	98	CT: 2:18.72; RT: 2:21.55	10	did not advance			10
Sean Halsted	10km sitting	LW11.5	98	N/A				CT: 28:35.8; RT: 29:10.8	7
Sean Halsted	15km sitting	LW11.5	98	N/A				CT: 43:25.6; RT: 44:18.8	9
Chris Klebl	1 km sprint sitting	LW11	94	CT: 2:18.39; RT: 2:27.22	9	did not advance			9
Chris Klebl	10km sitting	LW11	94	N/A				CT: 29:39.7; RT: 31:33.3	16
Chris Klebl	15km sitting	LW11	94	N/A				CT: 43:13.7; RT: 45:59.3	8
Greg Mallory	1 km sprint sitting	LW11	94	CT: 2:21.89; RT: 2:30.95	18	did not advance			18
Greg Mallory	10km sitting	LW11	94	N/A				CT: 30:35.3; RT: 32:32.4	24
Greg Mallory	15km sitting	LW11	94	N/A				CT: 46:30.6; RT: 46:30.6	26
Andy Soule	1 km sprint sitting	LW12	100	2:19.77	11	did not advance			11
Andy Soule	10km sitting	LW12	100	N/A				29:18.7	12
Andy Soule	15km sitting	LW12	100	N/A				43:32.8	10

Women

Athlete	Events	Class	Factor %	Qualification		Semifinal		Final	
Athlete	Events	Class	Factor %	Time	Rank	Time	Rank	Time	Rank
Monica Bascio	1 km sprint sitting	LW11	94	CT: 2:43.73; RT: 2:54.18	8 Q	CT: 2:56.90; RT: 3:08.19	4	did not advance	8
Monica Bascio	5km sitting	LW11	94	N/A				CT: 16:32.4; RT: 17:35.7	10
Monica Bascio	10km sitting	LW11	94	N/A				CT: 34:33.9; RT: 36:46.3	9
Kelly Underkofler	1 km sprint classic standing	LW8	92	CT: 4:51.17; RT: 5:16.49	did not advance				13
Kelly Underkofler	5km classic standing	LW8	92	N/A				CT: 18:37.2; RT: 20:14.3	10
Kelly Underkofler	15km free standing	LW8	92	N/A				CT: 58:19.6; RT: 1:00:07.8	8

Key

- RT = real time
- CT = calculated time

== Ice sledge hockey ==
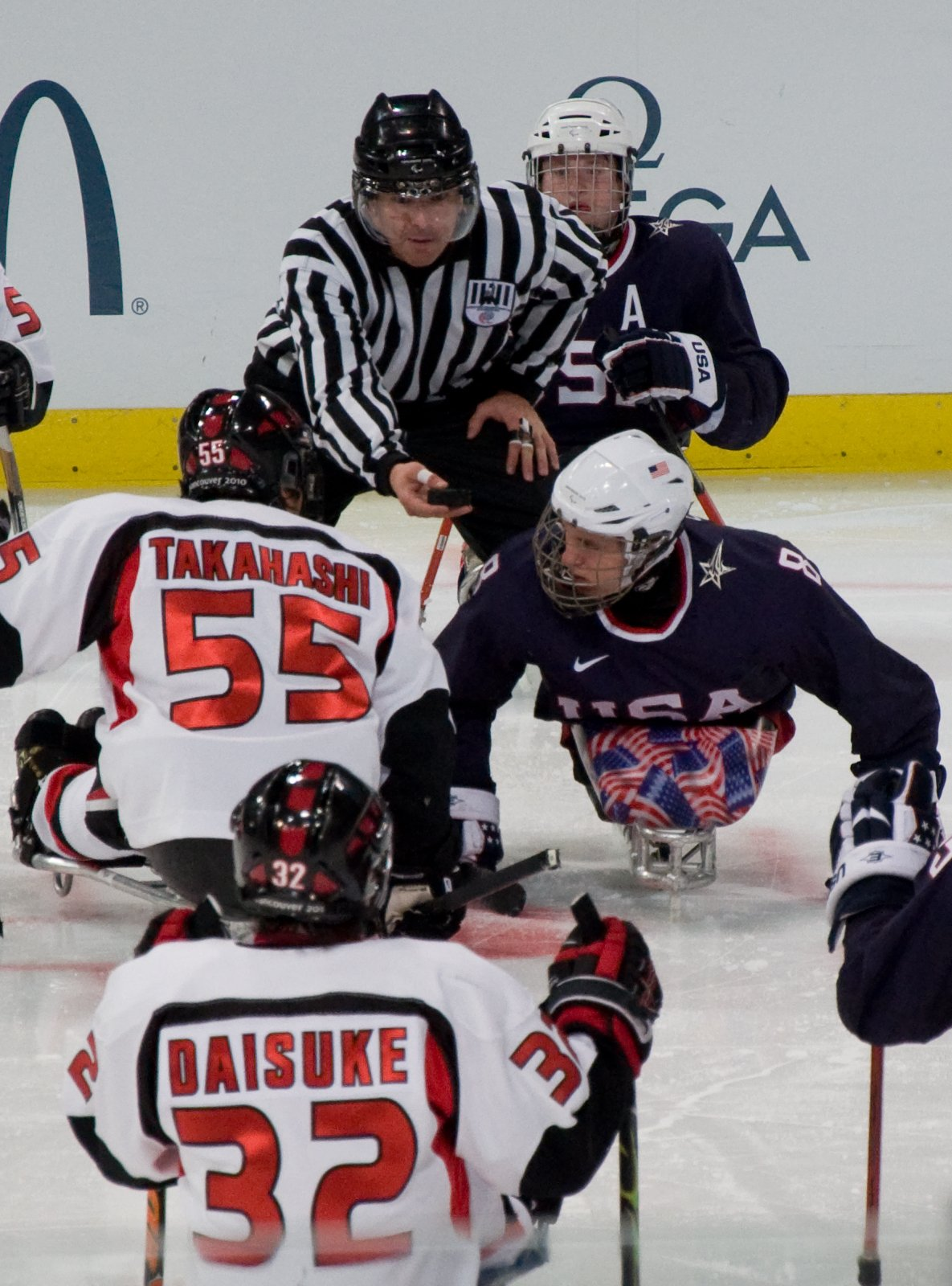
Team USA in a face-off against Team Japan during pool play on March 16, 2010.

The U.S. qualified for sledge hockey (also known as sled hockey) at the 2010 Paralympics by winning the 2009 IPC Ice Sledge Hockey World Championships. USA Hockey nominated the 15-member sledge hockey team on December 15, 2009, pending approval by the United States Olympic Committee. With a win over Japan in the gold medal game on March 20, 2010, the U.S. captured its second-ever gold medal in the sport. The team did not allow a goal in the tournament, outscoring its opponents by a total of 19 to 0. Alexi Salamone, born with deformed legs due to the Chernobyl nuclear disaster and later adopted by an American family, was the leading scorer for the U.S. with four goals and eight points in five games.

Squad list	Group stage (Pool A)		Semifinal	Final	
Squad list	Opposition Result	Rank	Opposition Result	Opposition Result	Rank
From: Mike Blabac; Steve Cash; Taylor Chace; Jimmy Connelly; Brad Emmerson; Joseph Howard; Tim Jones; Nikko Landeros; Taylor Lipsett; Adam Page; Josh Pauls; Alexi Salamone; Greg Shaw; Bubba Torres; Andy Yohe (captain); Head coach: Ray Maluta	South Korea; W 5–0	1 Q	Norway; W 3–0	Japan; W 2–0	1st place, gold medalist(s)
From: Mike Blabac; Steve Cash; Taylor Chace; Jimmy Connelly; Brad Emmerson; Joseph Howard; Tim Jones; Nikko Landeros; Taylor Lipsett; Adam Page; Josh Pauls; Alexi Salamone; Greg Shaw; Bubba Torres; Andy Yohe (captain); Head coach: Ray Maluta	Czech Republic; W 3–0	1 Q	Norway; W 3–0	Japan; W 2–0	1st place, gold medalist(s)
From: Mike Blabac; Steve Cash; Taylor Chace; Jimmy Connelly; Brad Emmerson; Joseph Howard; Tim Jones; Nikko Landeros; Taylor Lipsett; Adam Page; Josh Pauls; Alexi Salamone; Greg Shaw; Bubba Torres; Andy Yohe (captain); Head coach: Ray Maluta	Japan; W 6–0	1 Q	Norway; W 3–0	Japan; W 2–0	1st place, gold medalist(s)

== Wheelchair curling ==
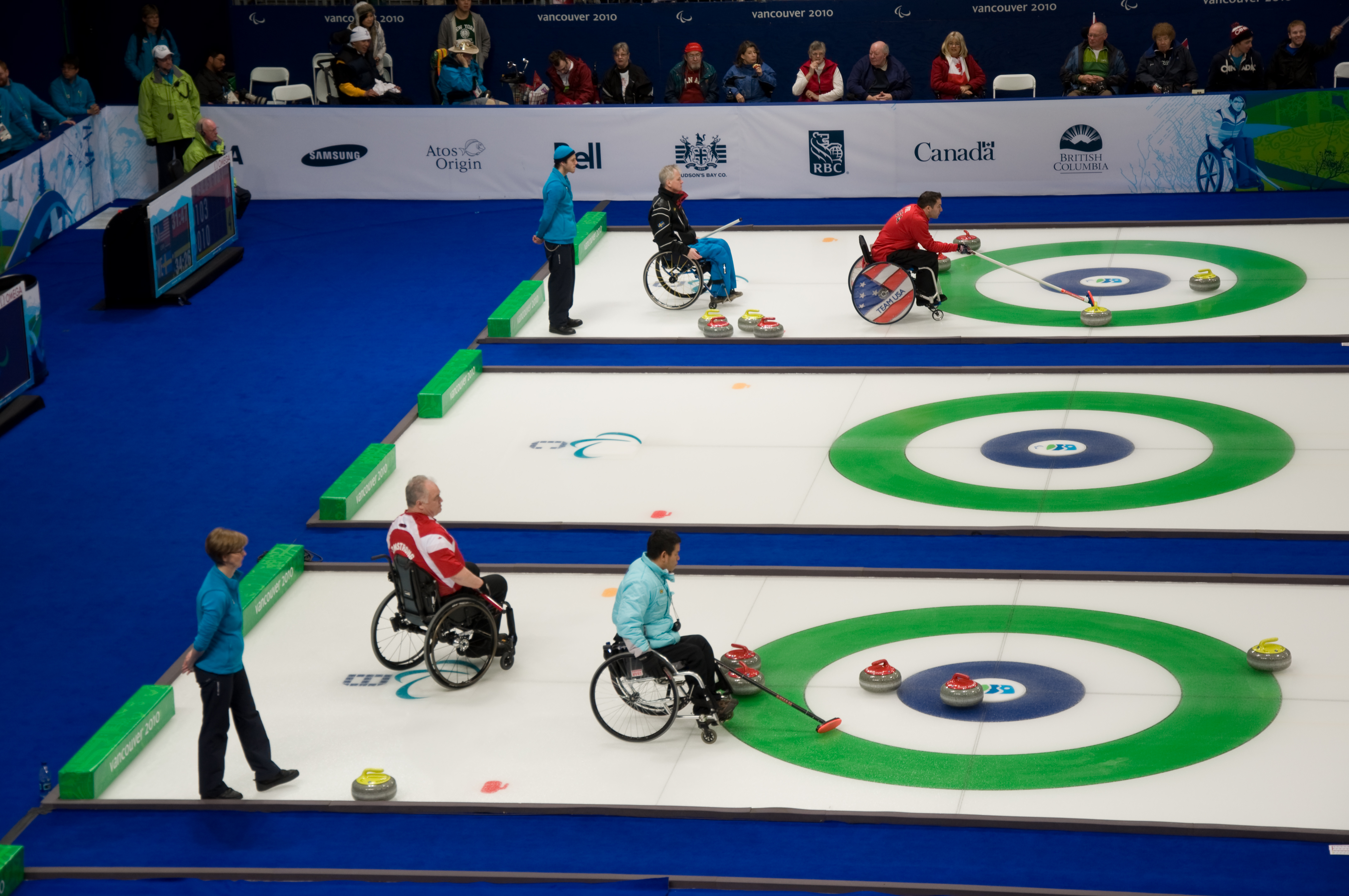
Above, the U.S. competes against Sweden in the bronze medal game while below, South Korea competes against Canada in the gold medal game.

The U.S. team qualified for the 2010 Paralympic wheelchair curling tournament based on their performance in the 2007, 2008, and 2009 World Wheelchair Curling Championships. After two straight losses in the playoff round, the team finished in fourth place.

=== Team ===
The team is as follows:

Skip: Augusto Perez
Third: Patrick McDonald
Second: James Pierce
Lead: Jacqui Kapinowski
Alternate: James Joseph
Coach: Steve Brown

=== Standings ===
Country	Skip	W	L
Canada	Jim Armstrong	7	2
United States	Augusto Perez	7	2
South Korea	Haksung Kim	6	3
Italy	Andrea Tabanelli	5	4
Sweden	Jalle Jungnell	5	4
Norway	Rune Lorentzen	3	6
Great Britain	Michael McCreadie	3	6
Germany	Jens Jaeger	3	6
Japan	Yoji Nakajima	3	6
Switzerland	Manfred Bolliger	3	6

=== Round robin results ===
The United States finished with a 7–2 win–loss record, in second place.

Draw 1 - Sheet A	1	2	3	4	5	6	7	8	Final
South Korea (Kim)	0	0	3	0	3	0	0	0	6
United States (Perez) 🔨	1	1	0	2	0	2	2	1	9

Draw 2 - Sheet D	1	2	3	4	5	6	7	8	Final
Canada (Armstrong)	0	4	2	2	0	2	0	X	10
United States (Perez) 🔨	2	0	0	0	1	0	2	X	5

Draw 3 - Sheet C	1	2	3	4	5	6	7	8	Final
United States (Perez) 🔨	0	0	2	1	0	1	1	1	6
Germany (Jaeger)	1	3	0	0	1	0	0	0	5

Draw 5 - Sheet D	1	2	3	4	5	6	7	8	Final
United States (Perez) 🔨	2	0	2	2	0	1	0	1	8
Italy (Tabanelli)	0	1	0	0	0	0	1	0	2

Draw 6 - Sheet B	1	2	3	4	5	6	7	8	EE	Final
Great Britain (McCreadie)	0	0	0	2	0	2	0	3	0	7
United States (Perez) 🔨	1	1	3	0	1	0	1	0	1	8

Draw 8 - Sheet A	1	2	3	4	5	6	7	8	Final
United States (Perez) 🔨	0	2	0	1	0	1	0	X	4
Sweden (Jungnell)	2	0	1	0	1	0	2	X	6

Draw 9 - Sheet C	1	2	3	4	5	6	7	8	Final
Norway (Lorentzen)	0	0	3	0	0	3	0	2	8
United States (Perez) 🔨	2	1	0	3	2	0	1	0	9

Draw 10 - Sheet B	1	2	3	4	5	6	7	8	Final
United States (Perez) 🔨	0	6	0	0	0	1	1	X	8
Japan (Nakajima)	1	0	1	0	1	0	0	X	3

Draw 11 - Sheet A	1	2	3	4	5	6	7	8	Final
Switzerland (Bolliger)	0	0	0	1	0	1	0	X	2
United States (Perez) 🔨	2	1	1	0	3	0	1	X	8

=== Semifinals ===
Sheet C	1	2	3	4	5	6	7	8	Final
United States (Perez) 🔨	2	0	2	0	0	0	1	0	5
South Korea (Kim)	0	1	0	3	1	1	0	1	7

=== Bronze medal game ===
Sheet D	1	2	3	4	5	6	7	8	Final
United States (Perez) 🔨	0	1	0	3	0	0	1	0	5
(bronze) Sweden (Jungnell)	3	0	1	0	1	1	0	1	7

== Media coverage ==
U.S. coverage of the 2010 Paralympic Games was provided primarily by the Universal Sports Television Network. A nightly two-hour show covering daily competition was broadcast from March 15–23, and on-demand replays were offered on UniversalSports.com. Daily video highlights were also available at the official website of the U.S. Paralympic Team, usparalympics.org. NBC showed a one-hour program covering the Opening Ceremony on March 13, and will show a two-hour highlights program on April 10.

== See also ==
- United States at the 2010 Winter Olympics
