= Alpine skiing at the 2010 Winter Paralympics – Men's combined =

Men's super combined at the X Paralympic Winter Games
- Paralympic alpine skiing
- Venue: Whistler Blackcomb
- Dates: March 21, 2010

The men's super combined competition of the Vancouver 2010 Paralympics is held at Whistler Blackcomb in Whistler, British Columbia. The competition has been rescheduled to Sunday March 21 due to recent weather conditions.

It was the first time super combined was arranged in the Paralympics.

== Visually impaired ==
In the combined visually impaired, the athlete with a visual impairment has a sighted guide. The two skiers are considered a team, and dual medals are awarded.

Rank	Bib	Name	Country	Super G	Rank	Slalom	Rank	Total	Difference
1st place, gold medalist(s)	10	Jakub Krako; Guide: Juraj Medera	Slovakia	1:23.85	1	50.76	3	2:14.61	
2nd place, silver medalist(s)	9	Gianmaria Dal Maistro; Guide: Tommaso Balasso	Italy	1:25.49	4	50.69	2	2:16.18	+1.57
3rd place, bronze medalist(s)	12	Miroslav Haraus; Guide: Martin Makovnik	Slovakia	1:24.67	2	51.64	6	2:16.31	+1.70
T4	3	Chris Williamson; Guide: Nick Brush	Canada	1:27.95	6	50.47	1	2:18.42	+3.81
T4	1	Nicolas Berejny; Guide: Sophie Troc	France	1:26.94	5	51.48	5	2:18.42	+3.81
6	11	Norbert Holik; Guide: Lubos Bosela	Slovakia	1:30.67	10	51.38	4	2:22.05	+7.44
7	5	Ivan Frantsev; Guide: Valentina Morozova	Russia	1:29.52	9	53.15	7	2:22.67	+8.06
8	2	Gabriel Gorce Yepes; Guide: Felix Aznar Ruiz de Alegria	Spain	1:28.86	8	55.18	9	2:24.04	+9.43
9	7	Andres Boira Diaz; Guide: Aleix Sune Segala	Spain	1:40.70	11	53.61	8	2:34.31	+19.70
	4	Christoph Prettner; Guide: Kurt Wastian	Austria	1:27.99	7	DNF			
	8	Jon Santacana Maiztegui; Guide: Miguel Galindo Garces	Spain	1:24.87	3	DNF			
	6	Mark Bathum; Guide: Slater Storey	United States	DNF					

== Sitting ==
Rank	Bib	Name	Country	Super G	Rank	Slalom	Rank	Total	Difference
1st place, gold medalist(s)	12	Martin Braxenthaler	Germany	1:23.82	5	46.34	1	2:10.16	
2nd place, silver medalist(s)	4	Jurgen Egle	Austria	1:25.43	10	47.37	2	2:12.80	+2.64
3rd place, bronze medalist(s)	10	Philipp Bonadimann	Austria	1:23.04	3	49.92	3	2:12.96	+2.80
4	1	Taiki Morii	Japan	1:20.62	1	53.37	9	2:13.99	+3.83
5	13	Takeshi Suzuki	Japan	1:25.06	8	50.84	4	2:15.90	+5.74
6	7	Cyril More	France	1:24.25	7	52.14	6	2:16.39	+6.23
7	5	Christopher Devlin-Young	United States	1:24.01	6	52.70	7	2:16.71	+6.55
8	18	Sang-Min Han	South Korea	1:22.86	2	53.93	10	2:16.79	+6.63
9	11	Yohann Taberlet	France	1:26.69	12	50.93	5	2:17.62	+7.46
10	19	Heath Calhoun	United States	1:23.66	4	55.33	11	2:18.99	+8.83
11	20	Franz Hanfstingl	Germany	1:30.53	14	56.71	12	2:27.24	+17.08
12	14	Carl Burnett	United States	1:37.95	15	53.10	8	2:31.05	+20.89
	15	Shannon Dallas	Australia	1:25.21	9	DNF			
	8	Thomas Nolte	Germany	1:28.47	13	DSQ			
	2	Josh Dueck	Canada	1:26.68	11	DSQ			
	3	Akira Kano	Japan	DNF					
	6	Hans Pleisch	Switzerland	DNF					
	9	Sean Rose	Great Britain	DNF					
	16	Reinhold Sampl	Austria	DNF					
	17	Jean-Yves le Meur	France	DNF					
	21	Oldrich Jelinek	Canada	DNF					

== Standing ==
Rank	Bib	Name	Country	Super G	Rank	Slalom	Rank	Total	Difference
1st place, gold medalist(s)	14	Gerd Schonfelder	Germany	1:21.59	2	50.25	3	2:11.84	
2nd place, silver medalist(s)	7	Vincent Gauthier-Manuel	France	1:21.37	1	50.67	5	2:12.04	+0.20
3rd place, bronze medalist(s)	12	Cameron Rahles-Rahbula	Australia	1:25.19	8	48.34	1	2:13.85	+2.01
4	6	Robert Meusburger	Austria	1:24.16	6	49.84	2	2:14.00	+2.16
5	4	Lionel Brun	France	1:22.86	3	52.48	10	2:15.34	+3.50
6	5	Hiraku Misawa	Japan	1:25.06	7	50.72	6	2:15.78	+3.94
7	3	Hubert Mandl	Austria	1:24.01	5	52.91	11	2:16.92	+5.08
8	8	Adam Hall	New Zealand	1:26.44	10	50.58	4	2:17.02	+5.18
9	2	Markus Salcher	Austria	1:25.52	9	54.20	13	2:19.72	+7.88
10	1	Thomas Pfyl	Switzerland	1:23.59	4	56.66	16	2:20.25	+8.41
11	9	Alexandr Alyabyev	Russia	1:30.44	13	51.18	8	2:21.62	+9.78
12	15	Stanislav Loska	Czech Republic	1:29.77	12	52.35	9	2:22.12	+10.28
13	16	Gakuta Koike	Japan	1:29.75	11	52.92	12	2:22.67	+10.83
14	13	Monte Meier	United States	1:33.07	16	51.13	7	2:24.20	+12.36
15	20	Andrzej Szczesny	Poland	1:32.14	15	54.25	14	2:26.39	+14.55
16	18	Martin France	Slovakia	1:31.39	14	57.20	18	2:28.59	+16.75
17	19	Kevin Wermeester	Germany	1:34.28	17	56.95	17	2:31.23	+19.39
18	21	David Warner	South Africa	1:37.92	18	56.38	15	2:34.30	+22.46
	10	Toby Kane	Australia	DNF					
	11	Michael Brugger	Switzerland	DNF					
	17	Matt Hallat	Canada	DNF					

== See also ==
- Alpine skiing at the 2010 Winter Olympics – Men's combined
