= Alpine skiing at the 2010 Winter Paralympics – Men's super-G =

Men's super-G competition

Men's super-G at the X Paralympic Winter Games
- Paralympic alpine skiing
- Venue: Whistler Blackcomb
- Dates: March 19, 2010; March 20, 2010

The men's super-G competition of the Vancouver 2010 Paralympics is held at Whistler Blackcomb in Whistler, British Columbia. The competition has been rescheduled to Friday March 19 and Saturday March 20 due to recent weather conditions.

== Visually impaired ==
In the super-G visually impaired, the athlete with a visual impairment has a sighted guide. The two skiers are considered a team, and dual medals are awarded.

Rank	Bib	Name	Country	Time	Difference
1st place, gold medalist(s)	9	Nicolas Berejny; Guide: Sophie Troc	France	1:21.55	
2nd place, silver medalist(s)	7	Jakub Krako; Guide: Juraj Medera	Slovakia	1:21.71	+0.16
3rd place, bronze medalist(s)	3	Miroslav Haraus; Guide: Martin Makovnik	Slovakia	1:22.75	+1.20
4	13	Mark Bathum; Guide: Slater Storey	United States	1:23.05	+1.50
5	10	Jon Santacana Maiztegui; Guide: Miguel Galindo Garces	Spain	1:23.21	+1.66
6	6	Chris Williamson; Guide: Nick Brush	Canada	1:23.74	+2.19
7	8	Gianmaria Dal Maistro; Guide: Tommaso Balasso	Italy	1:24.84	+3.29
8	11	Radomir Dudas; Guide: Maros Hudik	Slovakia	1:25.76	+4.21
9	5	Christoph Prettner; Guide: Kurt Wastian	Austria	1:26.58	+5.03
10	4	Norbert Holik; Guide: Lubos Bosela	Slovakia	1:28.27	+6.72
11	15	Gerd Gradwohl; Guide: Karl-Heinz Vachenauer	Germany	1:28.39	+6.84
12	2	Michal Beladic; Guide: Martin Pavlak	Slovakia	1:28.46	+6.91
13	12	Ivan Frantsev; Guide: Valentina Morozova	Russia	1:29.50	+7.95
14	14	Gabriel Gorce Yepes; Guide: Felix Aznar Ruiz de Alegria	Spain	1:35.40	+13.85
15	1	Andrea Boira Diaz; Guide: Aleix Sune Segala	Spain	1:36.71	+15.16

== Sitting ==
Rank	Bib	Name	Country	Time	Difference
1st place, gold medalist(s)	12	Akira Kano	Japan	1:19.98	
2nd place, silver medalist(s)	8	Martin Braxenthaler	Germany	1:20.63	+0.65
3rd place, bronze medalist(s)	6	Taiki Morii	Japan	1:20.98	+1.00
4	7	Christopher Devlin-Young	United States	1:21.00	+1.02
5	14	Takeshi Suzuki	Japan	1:22.28	+2.30
6	9	Robert Frohle	Austria	1:24.00	+4.02
7	19	Reinhold Sampl	Austria	1:24.05	+4.07
8	21	Heath Calhoun	United States	1:24.77	+4.79
9	5	Yohann Taberlet	France	1:24.79	+4.81
10	20	Dietmar Dorn	Austria	1:24.94	+4.96
11	10	Shannon Dallas	Australia	1:25.21	+5.23
12	1	Philipp Bonadimann	Austria	1:25.49	+5.51
13	2	Josh Dueck	Canada	1:25.66	+5.68
14	11	Thomas Nolte	Germany	1:25.80	+5.82
15	24	Sang-Min Han	South Korea	1:26.42	+6.44
16	3	Jong-Seork Park	South Korea	1:26.48	+6.50
17	31	Franz Hanfstingl	Germany	1:27.53	+7.55
18	29	Akira Taniguchi	Japan	1:27.79	+7.81
19	16	Jürgen Egle	Austria	1:28.41	+8.43
20	38	Jasmin Bambur	Serbia	1:28.82	+8.84
21	30	Kenji Natsume	Japan	1:29.07	+9.09
22	13	Tyler Walker	United States	1:29.28	+9.30
23	28	Kees-Jan van der Klooster	Netherlands	1:31.95	+11.97
24	37	Oldrich Jelinek	Czech Republic	1:34.62	+14.64
25	33	Talan Skeels-Piggins	Great Britain	1:37.62	+17.64
26	26	Luca Maraffio	Italy	1:38.72	+18.74
27	39	Enrico Giorge	Italy	1:38.83	+18.85
28	32	Radim Kozlovsky	Czech Republic	1:39.02	+19.04
29	23	Russell Docker	Great Britain	1:44.07	+24.09
	40	Sam Carter Danniels	Australia	DNS	
	4	Christoph Kunz	Switzerland	DNF	
	18	Sean Rose	Great Britain	DNF	
	22	Nicolas Loussalez-Artets	France	DNF	
	27	Carl Burnett	United States	DNF	
	34	Michael Stampfer	Italy	DNF	
	35	Nicholas Catanzarite	United States	DNF	
	36	Petter Ledin	Sweden	DNF	
	15	Hans Pleisch	Switzerland	DSQ	
	17	Cyril More	France	DSQ	
	25	Jean-Yves le Meur	France	DSQ	

== Standing ==
Rank	Bib	Name	Country	Time	Difference
1st place, gold medalist(s)	7	Gerd Schönfelder	Germany	1:20.11	
2nd place, silver medalist(s)	1	Vincent Gauthier-Manuel	France	1:21.24	+1.13
3rd place, bronze medalist(s)	9	Hubert Mandl	Austria	1:21.97	+1.86
4	5	Lionel Brun	France	1:22.42	+2.31
5	8	Cameron Rahles-Rahbula	Australia	1:22.65	+2.54
6	6	Michael Brugger	Switzerland	1:23.00	+2.89
7	11	Adam Hall	New Zealand	1:23.34	+3.23
8	14	Markus Salcher	Austria	1:23.68	+3.57
9	31	Gakuta Koike	Japan	1:25.29	+5.18
10	29	Mitchell Gourley	Australia	1:25.38	+5.27
11	10	Martin France	Slovakia	1:26.29	+6.18
12	28	Martin Cupka	Slovakia	1:26.50	+6.39
13	32	Stanislav Loska	Czech Republic	1:27.21	+7.10
14	12	Cedric Amafroi-Broisat	France	1:27.44	+7.33
15	34	Shinji Inoue	Japan	1:27.62	+7.51
16	21	Jeff Dickson	Canada	1:27.83	+7.72
17	19	Bradley Washburn	United States	1:27.93	+7.82
18	36	Matt Hallat	Canada	1:28.16	+8.05
19	26	Christian Lanthaler	Italy	1:28.64	+8.53
20	35	Morgan Perrin	Canada	1:29.15	+9.04
21	27	Micha Josi	Switzerland	1:29.66	+9.55
22	18	Alexandr Alyabyev	Russia	1:29.76	+9.65
23	13	Kevin Wermeester	Germany	1:29.95	+9.84
24	16	Marty Mayberry	Australia	1:30.50	+10.39
25	33	Bernhard Habersatter	Austria	1:30.58	+10.47
26	38	Kirk Schornstein	Canada	1:31.65	+11.54
27	24	Monte Meier	United States	1:31.91	+11.80
28	30	John Whitney	United States	1:32.97	+12.86
29	23	Laurent Caul-Futy	France	1:34.15	+14.04
30	37	Andrzej Szczesny	Poland	1:35.12	+15.01
31	22	George Sansonetis	United States	1:35.74	+15.73
32	40	Bruce Warner	South Africa	1:38.52	+18.51
33	25	Nicholas Watts	Australia	1:47.84	+27.83
	2	Thomas Pfyl	Switzerland	DNF	
	3	Romain Riboud	France	DNF	
	4	Robert Meusburger	Austria	DNF	
	15	Toby Kane	Australia	DNF	
	20	Hiraku Misawa	Japan	DNF	
	17	Manfred Auer	Austria	DSQ	
	39	Ralph Green	United States	DSQ	

== See also ==
- Alpine skiing at the 2010 Winter Olympics
