= Alpine skiing at the 2010 Winter Paralympics – Men's slalom =

Men's Slalom at the X Paralympic Winter Games
- Paralympic alpine skiing
- Venue: Whistler Blackcomb
- Dates: March 14, 2010; March 15, 2010

The Men's Slalom competition of the Vancouver 2010 Winter Paralympics was held at Whistler Blackcomb in Whistler, British Columbia. The competition was rescheduled to Sunday March 14 and Monday March 15 due to recent weather conditions.

== Visually impaired ==
In the slalom visually impaired, the athlete with a visual impairment has a sighted guide. The two skiers are considered a team, and dual medals are awarded.

Rank	Bib	Name	Country	Run 1	Rank	Run 2	Rank	Total	Difference
1st place, gold medalist(s)	12	Jakub Krako; Guide: Juraj Medera	Slovakia	50.41	2	55.41	1	1:45.82	
2nd place, silver medalist(s)	10	Jon Santacana Maiztegui; Guide: Miguel Galindo Garces	Spain	49.88	1	57.03	3	1:46.91	+1.09
3rd place, bronze medalist(s)	7	Gianmaria Dal Maistro; Guide: Tommaso Balasso	Italy	50.74	3	57.58	4	1:48.32	+2.50
4	3	Miroslav Haraus; Guide: Martin Makovnik	Slovakia	51.68	5	56.70	2	1:48.38	+2.56
5	4	Norbert Holik; Guide: Lubos Bosela	Slovakia	51.21	4	58.89	6	1:50.10	+4.28
6	14	Chris Williamson; Guide: Nick Brush	Canada	52.93	8	58.19	5	1:51.12	+5.30
7	6	Andres Boira Diaz; Guide: Aleix Sune Segala	Spain	54.17	11	1:00.61	7	1:54.78	+8.96
8	13	Maciej Krezel; Guide: Anna Ogarzynska	Poland	55.16	12	1:01.65	9	1:56.81	+10.99
9	2	Gerd Gradwohl; Guide: Karl-Heinz Vachenauer	Germany	55.70	14	1:01.56	8	1:57.26	+11.44
10	15	Michal Beladic; Guide: Martin Pavlak	Slovakia	56.56	15	1:03.09	10	1:59.65	+13.83
11	11	Mark Bathum; Guide: Slater Storey	United States	53.04	9	1:17.41	11	2:10.45	+24.63
	9	Valery Redkozubov; Guide: Viacheslav Molodtsov	Russia	55.22	13	DNF			
	8	Ivan Frantsev; Guide: Valentina Morozova	Russia	54.04	10	DNF			
	17	Nicolas Berejny; Guide: Sophie Troc	France	52.20	7	DNF			
	5	Radomir Dudas; Guide: Maros Hudik	Slovakia	1:00.35	16	DNF			
	1	Gabriel Gorce Yepes; Guide: Felix Aznar Ruiz de Alegria	Spain	52.10	6	DSQ			
	16	Christoph Prettner; Guide: Kurt Wastian	Austria	DSQ					
	18	Anthony Chalencon; Guide: Celine Dole	France	DSQ					
	19	Alexander Fedoruk; Guide: Vadim Makarov	Russia	DSQ					

== Sitting ==
Rank	Bib	Name	Country	Run 1	Rank	Run 2	Rank	Total	Difference
1st place, gold medalist(s)	15	Martin Braxenthaler	Germany	48.96	2	48.4	1	1:41.63	
2nd place, silver medalist(s)	8	Josh Dueck	Canada	49.59	4	53.7	3	1:46.29	+4.66
3rd place, bronze medalist(s)	10	Philipp Bonadimann	Austria	49.39	3	53.5	2	1:46.34	+4.71
4	9	Andreas Kapfinger	Austria	50.56	7	57.3	4	1:48.46	+6.83
5	5	Reinhold Sampl	Austria	51.16	9	59.5	10	1:50.02	+8.39
6	17	Akira Kano	Japan	52.83	13	1:02.9	13	1:52.31	+10.68
7	1	Taiki Morii	Japan	53.82	16	58.7	5	1:52.55	+10.92
8	7	Sean Rose	Great Britain	53.69	15	1:05.2	20	1:52.74	+11.11
9	23	Carl Burnett	United States	53.99	18	59.3	7	1:53.27	+11.64
10	12	Tyler Walker	United States	53.24	14	1:04.4	17	1:53.34	+11.71
11	34	Sang-Min Han	South Korea	52.58	12	1:04.0	15	1:53.60	+11.97
12	4	Thomas Nolte	Germany	56.06	22	58.9	6	1:55.00	+13.37
13	2	Dietmar Dorn	Austria	56.73	23	59.3	8	1:56.06	+14.43
14	22	Mitsufumi Yamamoto	Japan	55.26	20	1:00.9	12	1:56.17	+14.54
15	11	Takeshi Suzuki	Japan	50.21	6	1:04.3	16	1:56.19	+14.56
16	6	Gerald Hayden	United States	50.61	8	1:06.4	21	1:57.04	+15.41
17	20	Shannon Dallas	Australia	56.86	24	1:00.8	11	1:57.65	+16.02
18	25	Akira Taniguchi	Japan	52.24	11	1:08.2	23	1:57.89	+16.26
19	18	Hans Pleisch	Switzerland	55.52	21	1:03.0	14	1:58.56	+16.93
20	30	Timothy Farr	Great Britain	58.62	28	1:04.7	18	2:03.28	+21.65
21	33	Dino Sokolovic	Croatia	58.58	27	1:04.9	19	2:03.44	+ 21.81
22	27	Peter Williams	New Zealand	57.38	25	1:08.2	22	2:05.55	+23.92
23	29	Oldrich Jelinek	Czech Republic	1:01.07	31	1:08.6	24	2:09.65	+28.02
24	16	Yohann Taberlet	France	1:10.83	37	59.4	9	2:10.26	+28.63
25	31	Jasmin Bambur	Serbia	53.92	17	1:19.1	31	2:13.03	+31.40
26	39	Nicolas Loussalez-Artets	France	1:00.03	30	1:14.4	28	2:14.45	+32.82
27	35	Rafal Szumiec	Poland	1:05.30	33	1:09.9	25	2:15.20	+33.57
28	37	Radim Kozlovsky	Czech Republic	1:04.03	32	1:11.4	26	2:15.44	+33.81
29	41	Gal Jakic	Slovenia	1:08.70	35	1:14.2	27	2:22.88	+41.25
30	38	Simon Jacobsen	Sweden	1:09.56	36	1:16.2	30	2:25.73	+44.10
31	43	Talan Skeels-Piggins	Great Britain	1:13.66	38	1:16.0	29	2:29.65	+48.02
32	36	Enrico Giorge	Italy	1:08.22	34	1:22.0	32	2:30.24	+48.61
33	44	Arly Velasquez Penaloza	Mexico	1:41.84	40	1:35.6	33	3:17.41	+1:35.78
34	48	Tomas del Villar	Chile	1:43.10	41	2:23.2	35	4:06.25	+2:24.62
35	45	Juan Ruiz Hernandez	Mexico	2:07.22	42	2:06.5	34	4:13.67	+2:32.04
	14	Jürgen Egle	Austria	47.57	1	DNF			
	13	Jean-Yves le Meur	France	49.71	5	DNF			
	3	Cyril More	France	51.84	10	DNF			
	19	Christopher Devlin-Young	United States	54.05	19	DNF			
	26	Franz Hanfstingl	Germany	58.80	29	DNF			
	49	Xavi Fernandez Vazquez	Andorra	1:17.08	39	DNF			
	32	Jong-Seork Park	South Korea	57.54	26	DSQ			
	21	Heath Calhoun	United States	DNF					
	28	Christoph Kunz	Switzerland	DNF					
	40	Russell Docker	Great Britain	DNF					
	42	Hwan-Kyung Lee	South Korea	DNF					
	24	Jaroslaw Rola	Poland	DSQ					
	46	Juan Ignacio Maggi	Argentina	DNS					
	47	Leonardo Martinez	Argentina	DNS					

== Standing ==
Rank	Bib	Name	Country	Run 1	Rank	Run 2	Rank	Total	Difference
1st place, gold medalist(s)	7	Adam Hall	New Zealand	50.95	1	54.45	6	1:45.40	
2nd place, silver medalist(s)	10	Gerd Schönfelder	Germany	53.37	4	52.60	1	1:45.97	+0.57
3rd place, bronze medalist(s)	13	Cameron Rahles-Rahbula	Australia	53.08	2	54.61	8	1:47.69	+2.29
4	3	Robert Meusburger	Austria	53.19	3	54.56	7	1:47.75	+2.35
5	4	Vincent Gauthier-Manuel	France	54.01	5	53.78	2	1:47.79	+2.39
6	14	Lionel Brun	France	54.40	7	53.95	3	1:48.35	+2.95
7	8	Thomas Pfyl	Switzerland	54.06	6	54.32	5	1:48.38	+2.98
8	11	Monte Meier	United States	55.31	10	53.98	4	1:49.29	+3.89
9	20	Bradley Washburn	United States	54.82	8	54.79	10	1:49.61	+4.21
10	1	Alexandr Alyabyev	Russia	55.02	9	55.70	16	1:50.72	+5.32
11	2	Toby Kane	Australia	56.28	13	54.70	9	1:50.98	+5.58
12	18	Martin Falch	Austria	55.63	11	55.51	15	1:51.14	+5.74
13	5	Michael Brugger	Switzerland	55.73	12	55.46	14	1:51.19	+5.79
14	16	Stanislav Loska	Czech Republic	56.68	14	54.99	11	1:51.67	+6.27
15	9	Cedric Amafroi-Broisat	France	56.90	16	55.06	12	1:51.96	+6.56
16	17	Romain Riboud	France	56.68	14	55.43	13	1:52.11	+6.71
17	24	Andreas Preiß	Austria	57.28	18	55.79	17	1:53.07	+7.67
18	19	Gakuta Koike	Japan	57.40	19	55.83	18	1:53.23	+7.83
19	42	Martin Cupka	Slovakia	57.55	20	56.63	21	1:54.18	+8.78
20	23	Markus Salcher	Austria	57.90	21	56.49	20	1:54.39	+8.99
21	33	Kevin Wermeester	Germany	58.92	26	56.15	19	1:55.07	+9.67
22	26	Ralph Green	United States	58.11	22	58.67	24	1:56.78	+11.38
23	29	John Whitney	United States	59.61	27	57.68	22	1:57.29	+11.89
24	27	Martin France	Slovakia	58.59	24	59.02	25	1:57.61	+12.21
25	37	Kirk Schornstein	Canada	58.40	23	59.61	27	1:58.01	+12.61
26	21	Andrzej Szczesny	Poland	58.84	25	59.50	26	1:58.34	+12.94
27	30	Mitchell Gourley	Australia	1:00.92	29	58.08	23	1:59.00	+13.60
28	36	Hanjörg Lantschner	Italy	1:00.30	28	59.69	28	1:59.99	+14.59
29	32	Shinji Inoue	Japan	1:01.09	31	59.96	29	2:01.05	+15.65
30	34	Micha Josi	Switzerland	1:01.07	30	1:01.49	30	2:02.56	+17.16
31	15	Matt Hallat	Canada	57.19	17	1:07.01	34	2:04.20	+18.80
32	39	David Warner	South Africa	1:04.44	36	1:01.81	31	2:06.25	+20.85
33	40	Michal Klos	Poland	1:02.83	33	1:05.42	33	2:08.25	+22.85
34	45	Sadegh Kalhor	Iran	1:03.43	34	1:05.02	32	2:08.45	+23.05
35	25	Laurent Caul-Futy	France	1:01.71	32	1:08.13	35	2:09.84	+24.44
36	50	Mher Avanesyan	Armenia	1:09.74	37	1:09.79	36	2:19.53	+34.13
37	47	Mario Dadic	Croatia	1:12.67	39	1:15.46	37	2:28.13	+42.73
38	44	Ievgen Kravitz	Ukraine	1:22.84	40	1:30.97	39	2:53.81	+1:08.41
39	48	Nijaz Memic	Bosnia and Herzegovina	1:29.23	41	1:26.81	38	2:56.04	+1:10.64
40	46	Ioannis Papavasileiou	Greece	1:30.83	42	1:39.15	40	3:09.98	+1:24.58
	35	Zlatko Pesjak	Croatia	1:03.47	35	DNF			
	38	Nicholas Watts	Australia	1:10.80	38	DNF			
	6	Hiraku Misawa	Japan	DNF					
	12	Hubert Mandl	Austria	DNF					
	43	Balazs Koleszar	Hungary	DNF					
	22	Marty Mayberry	Australia	DSQ					
	41	George Sansonetis	United States	DSQ					
	49	Jorge Migueles	Chile	DSQ					
	28	Jeff Dickson	Canada	DNS					
	31	Luca Carrara	Italy	DNS					

== See also ==
- Alpine skiing at the 2010 Winter Olympics – Men's slalom
