= Alpine skiing at the 2010 Winter Paralympics – Men's downhill =

Men's Downhill at the X Paralympic Winter Games
- Paralympic alpine skiing
- Venue: Whistler Blackcomb
- Dates: March 13, 2010

The Men's Downhill competition of the Vancouver 2010 Paralympics was held at Whistler Blackcomb in Whistler, British Columbia. The competition was scheduled for Saturday, March 13, but was postponed to Thursday, March 18 due to bad weather conditions.

== Visually impaired ==
In the downhill visually impaired, the athlete with a visual impairment has a sighted guide. The two skiers are considered a team, and dual medals are awarded.

Rank	Bib	Name	Country	Time	Difference
1st place, gold medalist(s)	4	Jon Santacana Maiztegui; Guide: Miguel Galindo Garces	Spain	1:18.23	
2nd place, silver medalist(s)	7	Mark Bathum; Guide: Slater Storey	United States	1:18.63	+0.40
3rd place, bronze medalist(s)	6	Gerd Gradwohl; Guide: Karl-Heinz Vachenauer	Germany	1:20.40	+2.17
4	8	Jakub Krako; Guide: Juraj Medera	Slovakia	1:20.84	+2.61
5	5	Nicolas Berejny; Guide: Sophie Troc	France	1:20.96	+2.73
6	11	Christoph Prettner; Guide: Kurt Wastian	Austria	1:21.83	+3.60
7	1	Radomir Dudas; Guide: Maros Hudik	Slovakia	1:21.88	+3.65
8	12	Ivan Frantsev; Guide: Valentina Morozova	Russia	1:31.89	+13.66
9	10	Gabriel Gorce Yepes; Guide: Felix Aznar Ruiz de Alegria	Spain	1:38.02	+19.79
	2	Bart Bunting; Guide: Nathan Chivers	Australia	DNF	
	3	Chris Williamson; Guide: Nick Brush	Canada	DNF	
	9	Miroslav Haraus; Guide: Martin Makovnik	Slovakia	DNF	

== Sitting ==
Rank	Bib	Name	Country	Time	Difference
1st place, gold medalist(s)	11	Christoph Kunz	Switzerland	1:18.19	
2nd place, silver medalist(s)	2	Taiki Morii	Japan	1:18.63	+0.44
3rd place, bronze medalist(s)	15	Akira Kano	Japan	1:19.19	+1.00
4	19	Thomas Nolte	Germany	1:19.60	+1.41
5	10	Josh Dueck	Canada	1:19.88	+1.69
6	8	Yohann Taberlet	France	1:19.92	+1.73
7	4	Sean Rose	Great Britain	1:20.41	+2.22
8	17	Hans Pleisch	Switzerland	1:21.36	+3.17
9	28	Jasmin Bambur	Serbia	1:21.41	+3.22
10	1	Reinhold Sampl	Austria	1:21.88	+3.69
11	18	Takeshi Suzuki	Japan	1:22.28	+4.09
12	7	Jong-Seork Park	South Korea	1:22.52	+4.33
13	9	Christopher Devlin-Young	United States	1:22.65	+4.46
14	27	Franz Hanfstingl	Germany	1:23.16	+4.97
15	21	Dietmar Dorn	Austria	1:23.23	+5.04
16	26	Enrico Giorge	Italy	1:39.83	+21.64
17	23	Philipp Bonadimann	Austria	1:42.07	+23.88
18	20	Luca Maraffio	Italy	1:49.89	+31.70
	3	Shannon Dallas	Australia	DNS	
	5	Martin Braxenthaler	Germany	DNF	
	6	Tyler Walker	United States	DNF	
	12	Kees-Jan van der Klooster	Netherlands	DNF	
	13	Nicolas Loussalez-Artets	France	DNF	
	14	Joseph Tompkins	United States	DNF	
	16	Sang-Min Han	South Korea	DNF	
	22	Sam Carter Daniels	Canada	DNF	
	25	Cyril More	France	DNF	
	24	Russell Docker	Great Britain	DSQ	

== Standing ==
Rank	Bib	Name	Country	Time	Difference
1st place, gold medalist(s)	12	Gerd Schönfelder	Germany	1:20.80	
T (silver)	11	Michael Brugger	Switzerland	1:22.78	+1.98
T (silver)	14	Marty Mayberry	Australia	1:22.78	+1.98
4	10	Cameron Rahles-Rahbula	Australia	1:22.88	+2.08
5	15	Vincent Gauthier-Manuel	France	1:23.24	+2.44
6	3	Robert Meusburger	Austria	1:23.70	+2.90
7	17	Hubert Mandl	Austria	1:23.85	+3.05
8	5	Thomas Pfyl	Switzerland	1:24.17	+3.37
9	26	Christian Lanthaler	Italy	1:25.01	+4.21
10	1	Toby Kane	Australia	1:25.26	+4.46
11	2	Matt Hallat	Canada	1:25.44	+4.64
12	21	Gakuta Koike	Japan	1:26.31	+5.51
13	6	Manfred Auer	Austria	1:26.33	+5.53
14	20	Bradley Washburn	United States	1:26.40	+5.60
T15	7	Morgan Perrin	Canada	1:26.52	+5.72
T15	24	Hiraku Misawa	Japan	1:26.52	+5.72
17	18	Martin Cupka	Slovakia	1:26.89	+6.09
18	28	Stanislav Loska	Czech Republic	1:26.93	+6.13
19	8	Martin France	Slovakia	1:27.67	+6.87
20	25	Micha Josi	Switzerland	1:28.10	+7.30
21	13	George Sansonetis	United States	1:28.47	+7.67
22	16	Monte Meier	United States	1:28.48	+7.68
23	9	Romain Riboud	France	1:28.63	+7.83
24	23	Alexandr Alyabyev	Russia	1:34.30	+13.50
25	27	David Warner	South Africa	1:34.82	+14.02
	4	Lionel Brun	France	DNF	
	19	Jeff Dickson	Canada	DNF	
	22	Kevin Wermeester	Germany	DNF	

== See also ==
- Alpine skiing at the 2010 Winter Olympics – Men's downhill
