= Alpine skiing at the 2010 Winter Paralympics – Women's downhill =

Women's downhill at the X Paralympic Winter Games
- Paralympic alpine skiing
- Venue: Whistler Blackcomb
- Dates: March 13, 2010

The women's downhill competition of the Vancouver 2010 Paralympics was held at Whistler Blackcomb in Whistler, British Columbia. The competition was scheduled for Saturday, March 13, but was postponed to Thursday, March 18, due to bad weather conditions.

Viviane Forest became the first Paralympian to win a gold in both the Winter and Summer Games, by winning the women's downhill for visually impaired. She had previously won gold in the 2000 and 2004 Summer Paralympics for women's goalball.

== Visually impaired ==
In the downhill visually impaired, the athlete with a visual impairment has a sighted guide. The two skiers are considered a team, and dual medals are awarded.

Rank	Bib	Name	Country	Time	Difference
1st place, gold medalist(s)	1	Viviane Forest; Guide: Lindsay Debou	Canada	1:27.51	
2nd place, silver medalist(s)	6	Henrieta Farkašová; Guide: Natalia Subrtova	Slovakia	1:28.17	+0.66
3rd place, bronze medalist(s)	2	Danielle Umstead; Guide: Rob Umstead	United States	1:30.18	+2.67
4	4	Sabine Gasteiger; Guide: Stefan Schoner	Austria	1:32.00	+4.49
5	3	Melissa Perrine; Guide: Andrew Bor	Australia	1:33.30	+5.79
6	10	Alexandra Frantseva; Guide: Polina Popova	Russia	1:38.71	+11.20
7	8	Anna Cohi Fornell; Guide: Raquel Garcia Borreguero	Spain	1:45.94	+18.43
8	7	Natasha de Troyer; Guide: Diego van de Voorde	Belgium	1:48.85	+21.34
	5	Anna Kuliskova; Guide: Michaela Hubacova	Czech Republic	DNF	
	9	Caitlin Sarubbi; Guide: Gwynn Watkins	United States	DNF	

== Sitting ==
Rank	Bib	Name	Country	Time	Difference
1st place, gold medalist(s)	3	Alana Nichols	United States	1:23.31	
2nd place, silver medalist(s)	2	Laurie Stephens	United States	1:28.26	+6.95
3rd place, bronze medalist(s)	1	Claudia Lösch	Austria	1:29.89	+6.58
4	6	Stephani Victor	United States	1:36.99	+13.68
	4	Kuniko Obinata	Japan	DNF	
	5	Tatsuko Aoki	Japan	DNF	

== Standing ==
Rank	Bib	Name	Country	Time	Difference
1st place, gold medalist(s)	10	Lauren Woolstencroft	Canada	1:25.54	
2nd place, silver medalist(s)	7	Solène Jambaqué	France	1:29.94	+4.40
3rd place, bronze medalist(s)	11	Andrea Rothfuß	Germany	1:30.58	+5.04
4	3	Melania Corradini	Italy	1:30.70	+5.16
5	9	Karolina Wisniewska	Canada	1:30.82	+5.28
6	6	Allison Jones	United States	1:32.32	+6.78
7	4	Petra Smarzova	Slovakia	1:35.23	+9.69
8	1	Marie Bochet	France	1:35.58	+10.04
9	8	Andrea Dziewior	Canada	1:37.53	+11.99
10	12	Iveta Chlebakova	Slovakia	1:37.55	+12.01
11	13	Nathalie Tyack	France	1:45.37	+19.83
	2	Karin Fasel	Switzerland	DNS	
	5	Elitsa Storey	United States	DNS	

== See also ==
- Alpine skiing at the 2010 Winter Olympics
