= Taiki Morii =

Japanese para-alpine skier

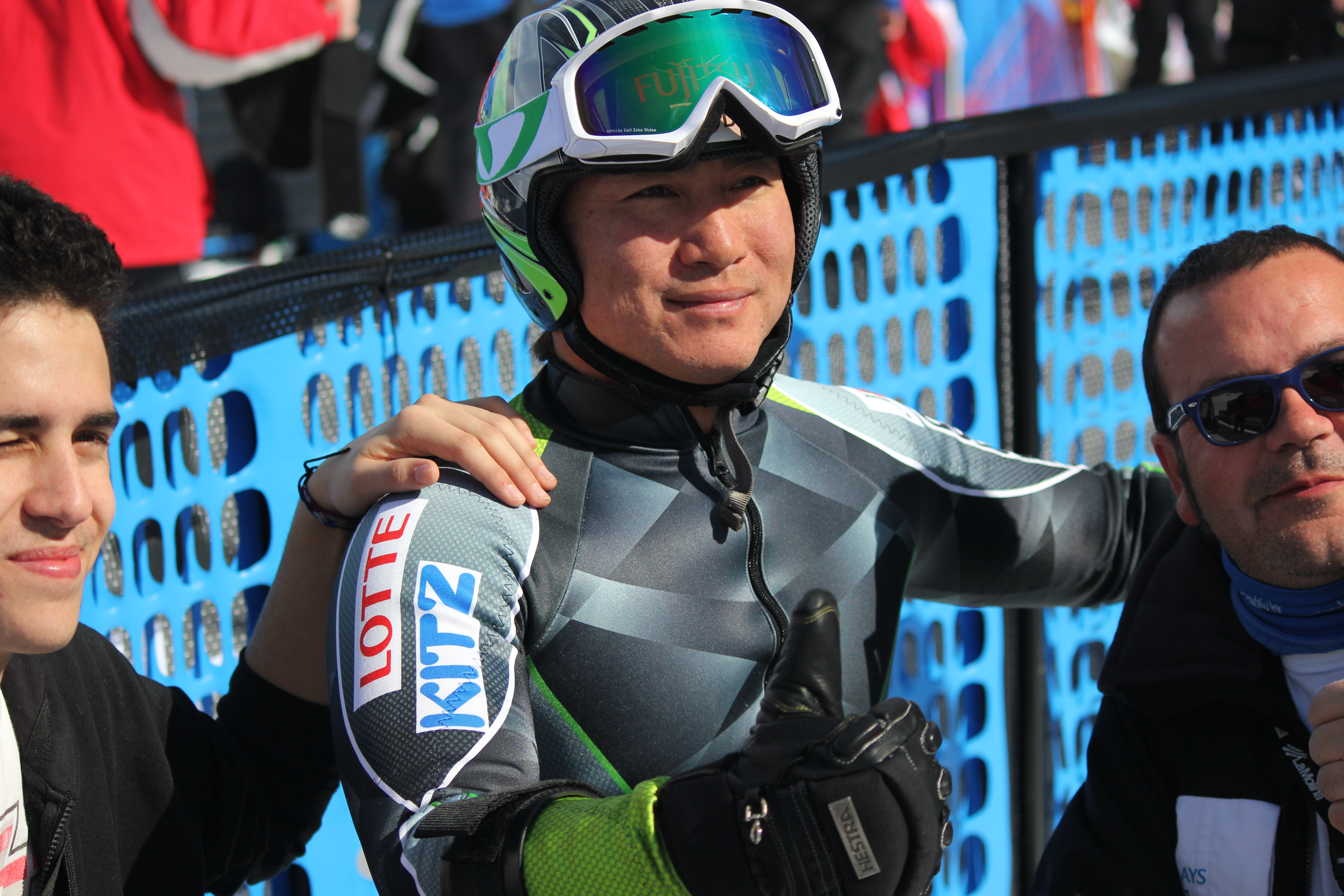
- Morii, gold medal at the 2013 IPC Para-alpine World Championships at La Molina, Spain.

Personal information
- Nationality: Japanese
- Born: July 9, 1980 (age 45) Akiruno, Tokyo, Japan

Sport
- Country: Japan
- Sport: Alpine skiing
- Event(s): Downhill slalom Giant slalom Super combined Super G
Medal record
Men's para alpine skiing
Representing Japan
Paralympic Games
Silver medal – second place	2006 Turin	Giant slalom, sitting
Silver medal – second place	2010 Vancouver	Downhill, sitting
Bronze medal – third place	2010 Vancouver	Super-G, sitting
Bronze medal – third place	2022 Beijing	Downhill, sitting
Bronze medal – third place	2022 Beijing	Super-G, sitting
World Championships
Gold medal – first place	2013 La Molina	Giant slalom, sitting
Gold medal – first place	2013 La Molina	Super combined, sitting
Gold medal – first place	2023 Lleida	Super-G, sitting
Silver medal – second place	2013 La Molina	Slalom, sitting
Silver medal – second place	2015 Panorama	Slalom, sitting
Silver medal – second place	2023 Lleida	Downhill, sitting
Bronze medal – third place	2015 Panorama	Downhill, sitting
Bronze medal – third place	2023 Lleida	Slalom, sitting

Taiki Morii (森井 大輝, Morii Taiki; born July 9, 1980) is a Japanese alpine skier and Paralympian.

== Career ==
He competed in the 2002 Winter Paralympics in Salt Lake City, United States, where he placed sixth at the Slalom and eighth at the Giant slalom, sitting LW11.

At the 2006 Winter Paralympics in Turin, Italy, he took the silver medal in the Giant slalom, sitting, and he placed ninth in the Downhill, fourth in the Slalom, and sixth in the Super-G, sitting.

He competed at the 2010 Winter Paralympics in Vancouver, British Columbia, Canada. He won a silver medal in the Downhill and bronze in the Super-G, sitting. He placed seventh at the Giant slalom, seventh in the Slalom, and fourth in the Super combined, sitting.
