= Natália Šubrtová =

Slovak alpine skier (born 1989)

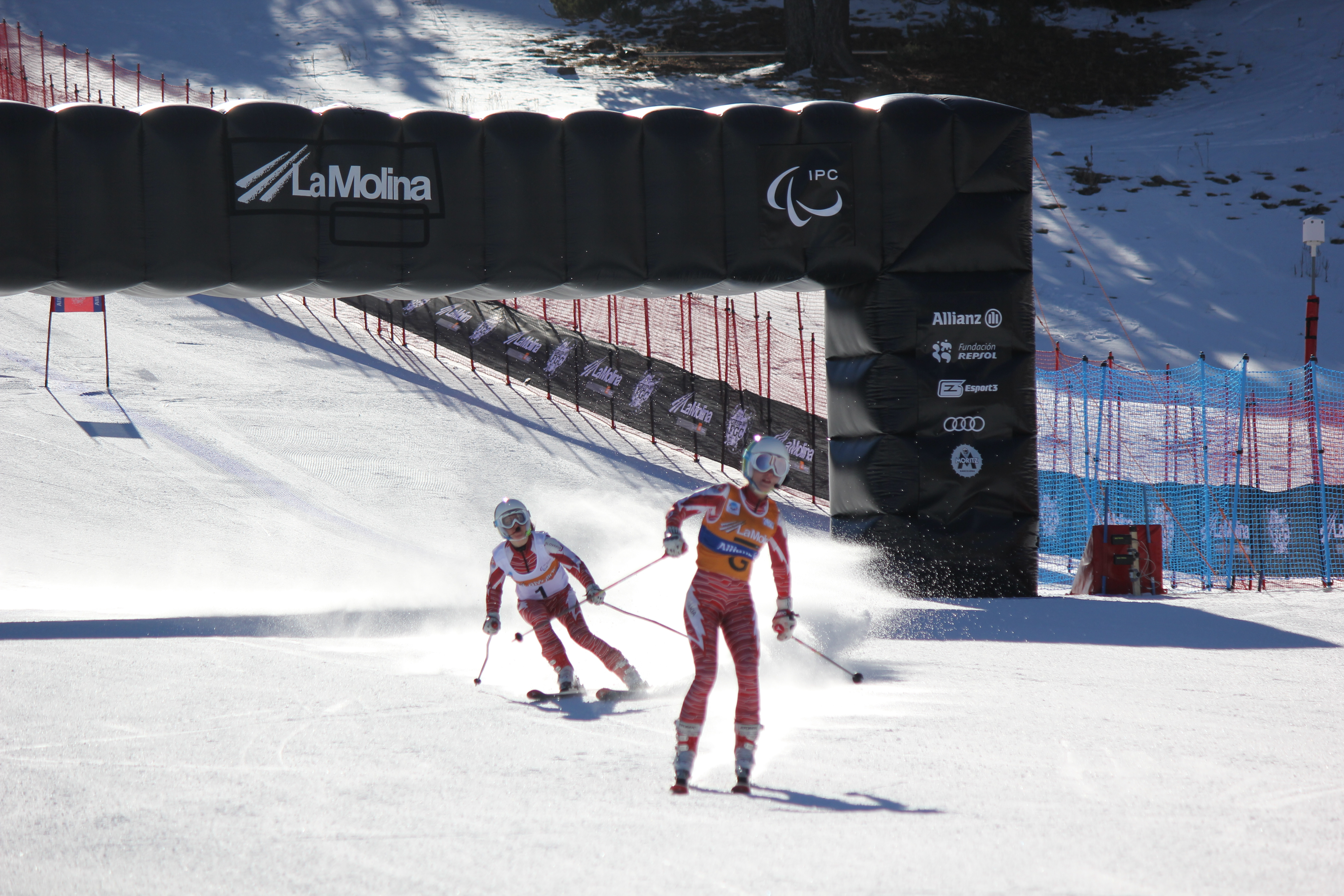
- Skier Henrieta Farkašová and guide Natália Šubrtová. 2013 IPC Alpine World Championships at La Molina in Spain. Day 1. Downhill final.

Personal information
- Born: 1 May 1989 (age 37) Kežmarok, Czechoslovakia
Medal record
Alpine skiing
Representing Slovakia
Paralympic Games
Gold medal – first place	2010 Vancouver	Super-G
Gold medal – first place	2010 Vancouver	Combined
Gold medal – first place	2010 Vancouver	Giant slalom
Gold medal – first place	2014 Sochi	Downhill
Gold medal – first place	2014 Sochi	Giant slalom
Gold medal – first place	2018 Pyeongchang	Downhill
Gold medal – first place	2018 Pyeongchang	Super-G
Gold medal – first place	2018 Pyeongchang	Combined
Gold medal – first place	2018 Pyeongchang	Giant slalom
Silver medal – second place	2010 Vancouver	Downhill
Silver medal – second place	2018 Pyeongchang	Slalom
Bronze medal – third place	2014 Sochi	Slalom

Natália Šubrtová (born 1 May 1989 in Kežmarok) is a retired Slovak alpine skier, sighted guide and eleven-time Paralympic Champion.

As the sighted guide for Henrieta Farkašová, she has won three gold at the 2010 Winter Paralympics, at Whistler Creekside in the women's giant slalom, women's super combined, women's super-G, visually impaired and a silver medal in Women's downhill, visually impaired. In the 2011 International Paralympic Committee (IPC) Alpine Skiing World Championships in Sestriere, Italy, January 2011 taking gold in the women's Visually Impaired event were the familiar pair from Slovakia, Henrieta Farkasova with her guide Natalia Subrtova. The two took an incredible four gold medals during the championships: women's giant slalom, super combined, downhill, and slalom. They also won a bronze medal in the team event.
