= Alpine skiing at the 2010 Winter Paralympics =

Alpine skiing at the X Paralympic Winter Games
- Venue: Whistler Blackcomb
- Dates: 13–21 March

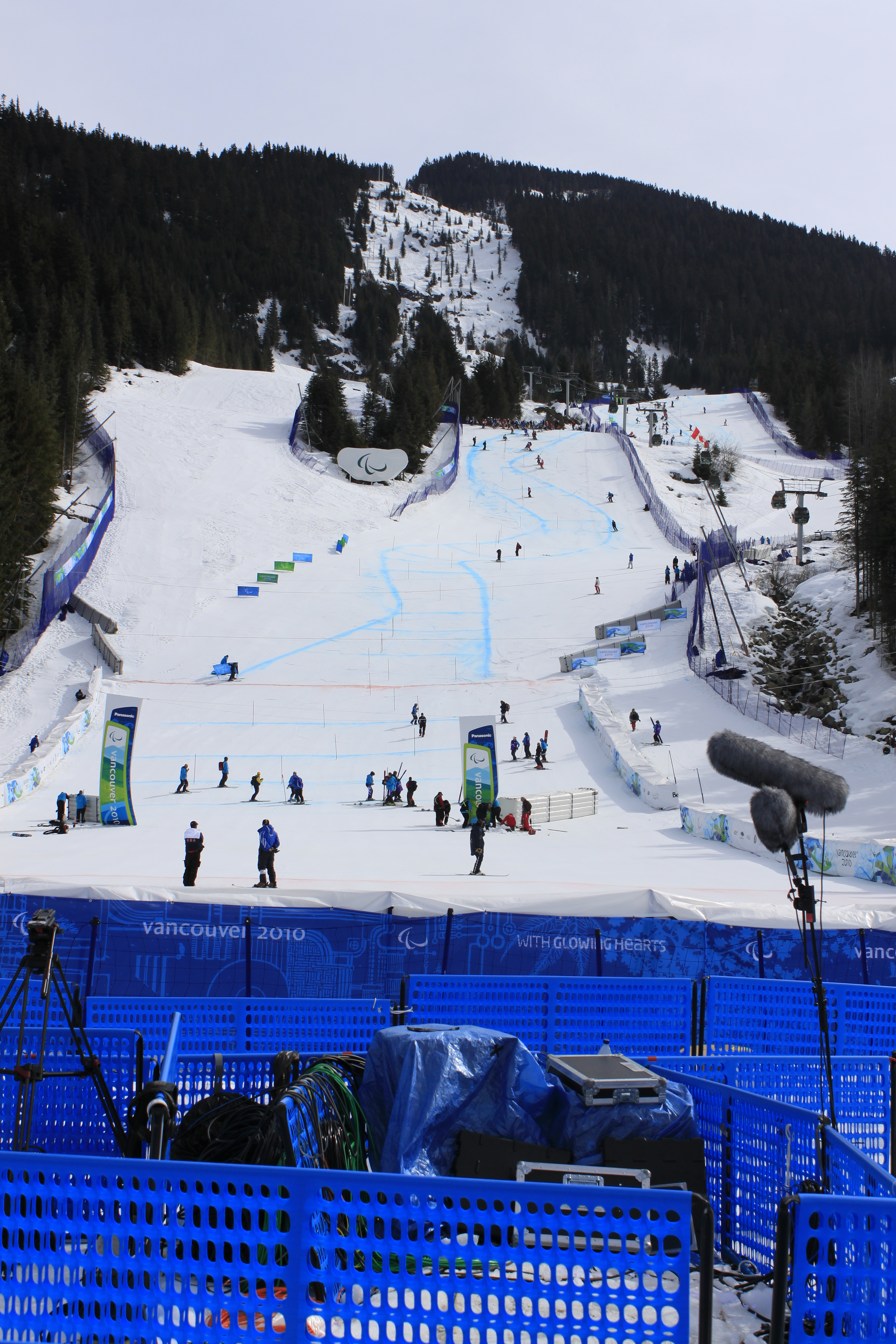
Whistler, Vancouver, the finals of the Alpine skiing.

The alpine skiing competition of the Vancouver 2010 Paralympics will be held at Whistler, British Columbia. The events were due to be held between 13 March, and 21 March 2010. Events scheduled for 13 March, however, were postponed due to weather conditions – specifically, low visibility.

In the Women's sitting giant slalom, Alana Nichols of the United States – a Paralympic champion in basketball from Beijing in 2008 – won her first of two skiing gold medals, becoming a rare winter-summer gold medalist. On 18 March, Viviane Forest became the first Canadian athlete to win a gold in both the Winter and Summer Paralympics, by winning the Women's Downhill for Visually Impaired. She had previously won gold in the 2000 and 2004 Summer Paralympics for women's goalball.

Lauren Woolstencroft sets the gold medal record with 5 gold medals, for most gold medals won by any Winter Paralympian at a single Games.

== Medal table ==
Rank	Nation	Gold	Silver	Bronze	Total
1	Germany (GER)	7	4	4	15
2	Canada (CAN)	6	4	3	13
3	Slovakia (SVK)	6	2	3	11
4	United States (USA)	3	5	3	11
5	Austria (AUT)	3	4	4	11
6	France (FRA)	1	4	1	6
7	Spain (ESP)	1	2	0	3
7	Switzerland (SUI)	1	2	0	3
9	Japan (JPN)	1	1	5	7
10	New Zealand (NZL)	1	0	0	1
11	Italy (ITA)	0	2	2	4
12	Australia (AUS)	0	1	3	4
13	Czech Republic (CZE)	0	0	1	1
Totals (13 entries)		30	31	29	90

== Events ==
The competition events are:

- Downhill: women – men
- Super-G: women – men
- Giant slalom: women – men
- Slalom: women – men
- Super combined: women – men

Each event has separate men's and women's competitions and separate standing, sitting, and visually impaired classifications. Visually impaired skiers compete with the help of a sighted guide. The skier with the visual impairment and the guide are considered a team, and dual medals are awarded.

=== Women's events ===
Event	Class	Gold		Silver		Bronze	
Downhill	visually impaired	Viviane Forest; Guide: Lindsay Debou; Canada	1:27.51	Henrieta Farkasova; Guide: Natalia Subrtova; Slovakia	1:28.17	Danelle Umstead; Guide: Rob Umstead; United States	1:30.18
Downhill	sitting	Alana Nichols; United States	1:23.31	Laurie Stephens; United States	1:28.26	Claudia Lösch; Austria	1:29.89
Downhill	standing	Lauren Woolstencroft; Canada	1:25.54	Solène Jambaqué; France	1:29.94	Andrea Rothfuß; Germany	1:30.58
Super-G	visually impaired	Henrieta Farkasova; Guide: Natalia Subrtova; Slovakia	1:33.81	Viviane Forest; Guide: Lindsay Debou; Canada	1:37.54	Anna Kuliskova; Guide: Michaela Hubacova; Czech Republic	1:38.02
Super-G	sitting	Claudia Lösch; Austria	1:33.89	Alana Nichols; United States	1:36.68	Anna Schaffelhuber; Germany	1:38.25
Super-G	standing	Lauren Woolstencroft; Canada	1:26.46	Melania Corradini; Italy	1:31.92	Andrea Rothfuß; Germany	1:32.47
Giant slalom	visually impaired	Henrieta Farkasova; Guide: Natalia Subrtova; Slovakia	2:56.65	Sabine Gasteiger; Guide: Stefan Schoner; Austria	3:02.18	Viviane Forest; Guide: Lindsay Debou; Canada	3:11.17
Giant slalom	sitting	Alana Nichols; United States	2:57.57	Stephani Victor; United States	3:01.78	Kuniko Obinata; Japan	3:08.71
Giant slalom	standing	Lauren Woolstencroft; Canada	2:34.03	Andrea Rothfuß; Germany	2:41.60	Petra Smarzova; Slovakia	2:41.63
Slalom	visually impaired	Sabine Gasteiger; Guide: Stefan Schoner; Austria	2:00.56	Viviane Forest; Guide: Lindsay Debou; Canada	2:01.45	Jessica Gallagher; Guide: Eric Bickerton; Australia	2:04.35
Slalom	sitting	Claudia Lösch; Austria	2:12.05	Stephani Victor; United States	2:12.63	Kuniko Obinata; Japan	2:18.60
Slalom	standing	Lauren Woolstencroft; Canada	1:51.97	Andrea Rothfuß; Germany	1:58.35	Karolina Wisniewska; Canada	1:58.84
Super Combined	visually impaired	Henrieta Farkasova; Guide: Natalia Subrtova; Slovakia	2:34.61	Viviane Forest; Guide: Lindsay Debou; Canada	2:35.94	Danelle Umstead; Guide: Rob Umstead; United States	2:48.75
Super Combined	sitting	Stephani Victor; United States	2:40.71	Claudia Lösch; Austria	2:44.28	Alana Nichols; United States	2:47.54
Super Combined	standing	Lauren Woolstencroft; Canada	2:22.67	Solène Jambaqué; France	2:34.82	Karolina Wisniewska; Canada	2:35.47

=== Men's events ===
Event	Class	Gold		Silver		Bronze	
Downhill	visually impaired	Jon Santacana Maiztegui; Guide: Miguel Galindo Garces; Spain	1:18.23	Mark Bathum; Guide: Slater Storey; United States	1:18.63	Gerd Gradwohl; Guide: Karl-Heinz Vachenauer; Germany	1:20.40
Downhill	sitting	Christoph Kunz; Switzerland	1:18.19	Taiki Morii; Japan	1:18.63	Akira Kano; Japan	1:19.19
Downhill	standing	Gerd Schönfelder; Germany	1:20.80	Marty Mayberry; Australia; Michael Brugger; Switzerland	1:22.78		
Super-G	visually impaired	Nicolas Berejny; Guide: Sophie Troc; France	1:21.55	Jakub Krako; Guide: Juraj Medera; Slovakia	1:21.71	Miroslav Haraus; Guide: Martin Makovnik; Slovakia	1:22.75
Super-G	sitting	Akira Kano; Japan	1:19.98	Martin Braxenthaler; Germany	1:20.63	Taiki Morii; Japan	1:20.98
Super-G	standing	Gerd Schönfelder; Germany	1:20.11	Vincent Gauthier-Manuel; France	1:21.24	Hubert Mandl; Austria	1:21.97
Giant slalom	visually impaired	Jakub Krako; Guide: Juraj Medera; Slovakia	2:41.99	Jon Santacana Maiztegui; Guide: Miguel Galindo Garces; Spain	2:42.20	Gianmaria Dal Maistro; Guide: Tommaso Balasso; Italy	2:44.25
Giant slalom	sitting	Martin Braxenthaler; Germany	2:37.40	Christoph Kunz; Switzerland	2:40.35	Takeshi Suzuki; Japan	2:45.61
Giant slalom	standing	Gerd Schönfelder; Germany	2:23.92	Robert Meusburger; Austria	2:26.08	Vincent Gauthier-Manuel; France	2:26.33
Slalom	visually impaired	Jakub Krako; Guide: Juraj Medera; Slovakia	1:45.82	Jon Santacana Maiztegui; Guide: Miguel Galindo Garces; Spain	1:46.91	Gianmaria Dal Maistro; Guide: Tommaso Balasso; Italy	1:48.32
Slalom	sitting	Martin Braxenthaler; Germany	1:41.63	Josh Dueck; Canada	1:46.29	Philipp Bonadimann; Austria	1:46.34
Slalom	standing	Adam Hall; New Zealand	1:45.40	Gerd Schönfelder; Germany	1:45.97	Cameron Rahles-Rahbula; Australia	1:47.69
Super Combined	visually impaired	Jakub Krako; Guide: Juraj Medera; Slovakia	2:14.61	Gianmaria Dal Maistro; Guide: Tommaso Balasso; Italy	2:16.18	Miroslav Haraus; Guide: Martin Makovnik; Slovakia	2:16.31
Super Combined	sitting	Martin Braxenthaler; Germany	2:10.16	Jürgen Egle; Austria	2:12.80	Philipp Bonadimann; Austria	2:12.96
Super Combined	standing	Gerd Schönfelder; Germany	2:11.84	Vincent Gauthier-Manuel; France	2:12.04	Cameron Rahles-Rahbula; Australia	2:13.85

== Competition schedule ==
All times are Pacific Standard Time (UTC-8).

Day	Date	Start	Event
Day 2	Sat 13 Mar,	11:30	Downhill Men & Women (all classes)
Day 3	Sun 14 Mar,	11:30	Super-G Men & Women (standing)
Day 4	Mon 15 Mar,	11:30	Super-G Men & Women (Sitting & Visually Impaired)
Day 5	Tue 16 Mar,	9:30	Super Combined Men & Women (all classes)
Day 5	Tue 16 Mar,	13:00	Super Combined Men & Women (all classes)
Day 7	Thu 18 Mar,	10:00	Giant slalom Men & Women (standing)
Day 7	Thu 18 Mar,	13:00	Giant slalom Men & Women (standing)
Day 8	Fri 19 Mar,	10:00	Giant slalom Men & Women (Sitting & Visually Impaired)
Day 8	Fri 19 Mar,	13:00	Giant slalom Men & Women (Sitting & Visually Impaired)
Day 9	Sat 20 Mar,	10:00	Slalom Men & Women (standing)
Day 9	Sat 20 Mar,	13:00	Slalom Men & Women (standing)
Day 10	Sun 21 Mar,	10:00	Slalom Men & Women (Sitting & Visually Impaired)
Day 10	Sun 21 Mar,	13:00	Slalom Men & Women (Sitting & Visually Impaired)

== See also ==
- Alpine skiing at the 2010 Winter Olympics
