= Henrieta Farkašová =

Slovak para-alpine skier (born 1986)

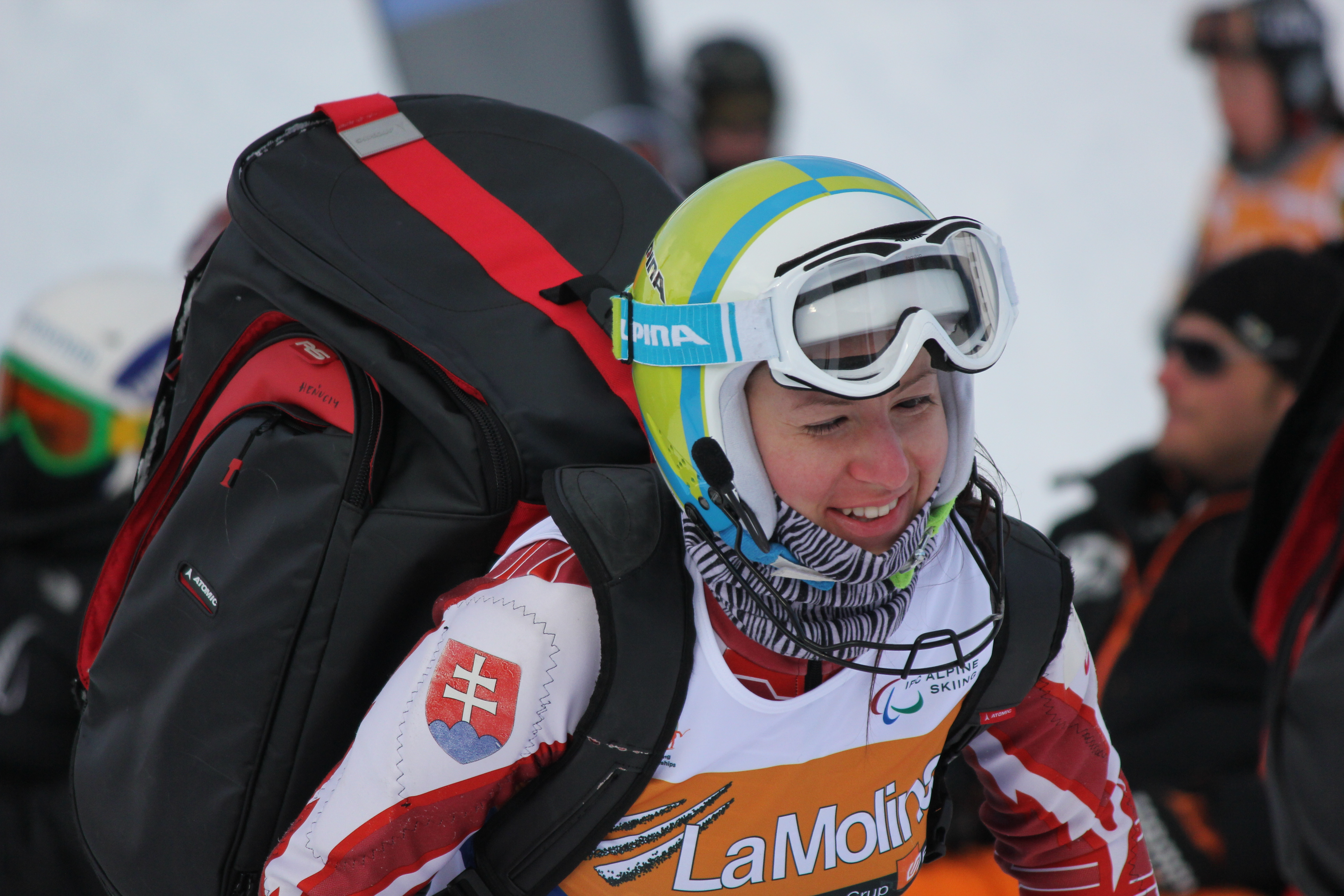
- Farkašová at the 2013 IPC Alpine World Championships

Personal information
- Born: 3 May 1986 (age 40) Rožňava, Czechoslovakia

Sport
- Sport: Skiing
Medal record
Alpine skiing – Visually impaired
Representing Slovakia
Paralympic Games
| Gold medal – first place | 2010 Vancouver | Super-G |
| Gold medal – first place | 2010 Vancouver | Combined |
| Gold medal – first place | 2010 Vancouver | Giant slalom |
| Gold medal – first place | 2014 Sochi | Downhill |
| Gold medal – first place | 2014 Sochi | Giant slalom |
| Gold medal – first place | 2018 Pyeongchang | Downhill |
| Gold medal – first place | 2018 Pyeongchang | Super-G |
| Gold medal – first place | 2018 Pyeongchang | Combined |
| Gold medal – first place | 2018 Pyeongchang | Giant slalom |
| Gold medal – first place | 2022 Beijing | Downhill |
| Gold medal – first place | 2022 Beijing | Combined |
| Silver medal – second place | 2010 Vancouver | Downhill |
| Silver medal – second place | 2018 Pyeongchang | Slalom |
| Bronze medal – third place | 2014 Sochi | Slalom |
IPC Alpine Skiing World Championships
| Gold medal – first place | 2009 Pyeongchang | Downhill |
| Gold medal – first place | 2009 Pyeongchang | Super-G |
| Gold medal – first place | 2011 Sestriere | Downhill |
| Gold medal – first place | 2011 Sestriere | Giant slalom |
| Gold medal – first place | 2011 Sestriere | Slalom |
| Gold medal – first place | 2011 Sestriere | Combined |
| Gold medal – first place | 2013 La Molina | Downhill |
| Gold medal – first place | 2013 La Molina | Giant slalom |
| Gold medal – first place | 2013 La Molina | Slalom |
| Gold medal – first place | 2017 Tarvisio | Giant slalom |
| Gold medal – first place | 2017 Tarvisio | Slalom |
| Gold medal – first place | 2017 Tarvisio | Super-G |
| Gold medal – first place | 2017 Tarvisio | Super combined |
| Gold medal – first place | 2019 Kranjska Gora | Giant slalom |
| Gold medal – first place | 2019 Kranjska Gora | Slalom |
| Gold medal – first place | 2021 Lillehammer | Downhill |
| Gold medal – first place | 2021 Lillehammer | Super-G |
| Silver medal – second place | 2009 Pyeongchang | Combined |
| Silver medal – second place | 2017 Tarvisio | Downhill |
| Silver medal – second place | 2021 Lillehammer | Giant slalom |
| Bronze medal – third place | 2011 Sestriere | Team event |

Henrieta Farkašová (born 3 May 1986) is a retired Slovak alpine skier, eleven-time Paralympic champion and seventeen-time world champion in the B3 (classification) category.

== Biography ==
Farkašová's motto is: "Impossible is nothing".

Farkašová won three gold medals at the 2010 Winter Paralympics, at Whistler Creekside in the Women's giant slalom, Women's Super combined, Women's super-G, visually impaired and a silver medal in Women's downhill, visually impaired.

Farkašová clinched the sixth gold medal of her Paralympic career when she won the women's visually impaired downhill event during the 2018 Winter Paralympics.

In 2019 she received Laureus World Sports Award for Sportsperson of the Year with a Disability.

Farkašová skiing guide was Natália Šubrtová. Her new skiing guide is Michal Červeň.

== Other activities ==
Farkašová appeared in 2023 season of Let's Dance.
