= Luba Lowery =

Russian-born American paralympic athlete

Personal information
- Born: Russia
- Education: Gould Academy

Sport
- Country: United States
- Disability: Proximal femoral focal deficiency
- Event(s): Slalom skiing giant slalom Open water swimming
Medal record
Women's para swimming
Representing United States
2010 Vancouver

Luba Lowery is a Russian-born American paralympic athlete. Lowery represented the United States in the 2010 Paralympic Games. Lowery has been involved in both competitive skiing and swimming.

== Biography ==
Lowery was born in Russia and was adopted when she was four years old. She grew up in Cumberland, Maine. When she was eight years old, because of a congenital bone defect, Proximal Focal Femoral Disorder (PFFD), her right leg was amputated. Lowery attended Gould Academy.

Lowery represented the United States in the 2010 Paralympic Games in Vancouver. She took seventh place in the slalom and ninth place in the giant slalom.

Lowery's first open-water swimming race took place in 2015, where she came in 42nd in women's times and 118th overall. In October 2015, she was inducted into the Maine Ski Hall of Fame.
