= Miroslav Haraus =

Slovak para-alpine skier (born 1986)

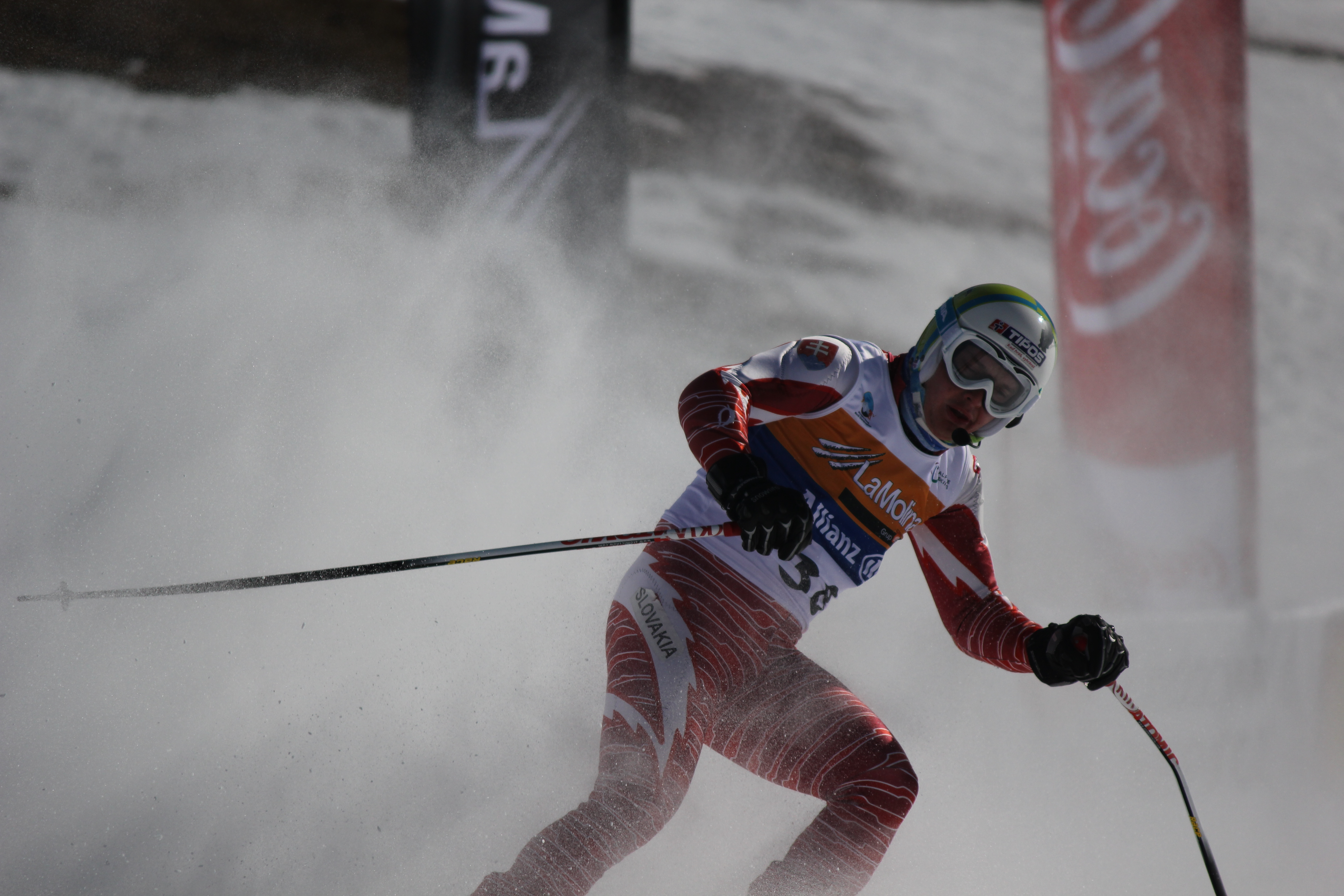
- Haraus at the 2013 IPC World Championships

Personal information
- Born: 1 August 1986 (age 39) Prešov, Czechoslovakia

Sport
- Sport: Skiing
Medal record
Men's para alpine skiing Visually impaired
Representing Slovakia
Paralympic Games
| Gold medal – first place | 2018 Pyeongchang | Super combined |
| Silver medal – second place | 2014 Sochi | Downhill |
| Bronze medal – third place | 2010 Vancouver | Super-G |
| Bronze medal – third place | 2010 Vancouver | Super combined |
| Bronze medal – third place | 2018 Pyeongchang | Super-G |
| Bronze medal – third place | 2022 Beijing | Giant slalom |
| Bronze medal – third place | 2022 Beijing | Slalom |
IPC Alpine Skiing World Championships
| Gold medal – first place | 2015 Panorama | Super Combined |
| Silver medal – second place | 2013 La Molina | Slalom |
| Silver medal – second place | 2013 La Molina | Super Combined |
| Silver medal – second place | 2015 Panorama | Slalom |
| Silver medal – second place | 2019 Kranjska Gora | Slalom |
| Silver medal – second place | 2021 Lillehammer | Downhill |
| Bronze medal – third place | 2009 Pyeongchang | Super-G |
| Bronze medal – third place | 2009 Pyeongchang | Slalom |
| Bronze medal – third place | 2015 Panorama | Super-G |
| Bronze medal – third place | 2015 Panorama | Downhill |
| Bronze medal – third place | 2017 Tarvisio | Downhill |
| Bronze medal – third place | 2019 Kranjska Gora | Super-G |
| Bronze medal – third place | 2019 Kranjska Gora | Super combined |
| Bronze medal – third place | 2021 Lillehammer | Super-G |
| Bronze medal – third place | 2021 Lillehammer | Super combined |

Miroslav Haraus (born 1 August 1986) is a Slovak Paralympic skier. He first medaled in 2010, but won his first gold at the 2018 Winter Paralympics.

He won the bronze medal in the men's giant slalom visually impaired event at the 2022 Winter Paralympics held in Beijing, China.
