= Slovakia at the 2010 Winter Paralympics =

- IPC code: SVK
- NPC: Slovak Paralympic Committee
- Website: www.spv.sk

in Vancouver
- Competitors: 13 in 3 sports
- Flag bearer: Ivaeta Chlebakova
- Medals Ranked 4th: Gold 6 Silver 2 Bronze 3 Total 11

Winter Paralympics appearances (overview)
- 1994; 1998; 2002; 2006; 2010; 2014; 2018; 2022; 2026

Other related appearances
- Czechoslovakia (1976–1992)

Slovakia will send 13 competitors to compete in three disciplines at the 2010 Winter Paralympics in Vancouver, British Columbia, Canada.

== Medalists ==
Medal	Name	Sport	Event
Gold	Henrieta Farkašová; Guide: Natália Šubrtová	Alpine skiing	Women's Super-G visually impaired
Gold	Henrieta Farkašová; Guide: Natália Šubrtová	Alpine skiing	Women's giant slalom visually impaired
Gold	Henrieta Farkašová; Guide: Natália Šubrtová	Alpine skiing	Women's Super Combined visually impaired
Gold	Jakub Krako; Guide: Juraj Medera	Alpine skiing	Men's giant slalom visually impaired
Gold	Jakub Krako; Guide: Juraj Medera	Alpine skiing	Men's slalom visually impaired
Gold	Jakub Krako; Guide: Juraj Medera	Alpine skiing	Men's Super Combined visually impaired
Silver	Henrieta Farkašová; Guide: Natália Šubrtová	Alpine skiing	Women's Downhill visually impaired
Silver	Jakub Krako; Guide: Juraj Medera	Alpine skiing	Men's Super-G visually impaired
Bronze	Petra Smaržová	Alpine skiing	Women's giant slalom standing
Bronze	Miroslav Haraus; Guide: Martin Makovnik	Alpine skiing	Men's Super-G visually impaired
Bronze	Miroslav Haraus; Guide: Martin Makovnik	Alpine skiing	Men's Super Combined visually impaired

== Alpine skiing ==
Slovakia fielded a team of 11 delegates into the Alpine Ski competition at the 2010 Winter Paralympics, with all of the medals being won by alpine skiers. The medalists are:

- (gold) Henrieta Farkasova - Women's Super Combined, visually impaired
- (gold) Henrieta Farkasova - Women's Super G, visually impaired
- (gold) Henrieta Farkasova - Women's giant slalom, visually impaired
- (gold) Jakub Krako - Men's Super Combined, visually impaired
- (gold) Jakub Krako - Men's giant slalom, visually impaired
- (gold) Jakub Krako - Men's slalom, visually impaired
- (silver) Jakub Krako - Men's Super-G, visually impaired
- (silver) Henrieta Farkasova - Women's Downhill, visually impaired
- (bronze) Miroslav Haraus - Men's Super-G, visually impaired
- (bronze) Miroslav Haraus - Men's Super Combined, visually impaired
- (bronze) Petra Smarzova - Women's giant slalom, standing

== See also ==
- Slovakia at the 2010 Winter Olympics
- Slovakia at the Paralympics
