= Austria at the 2010 Winter Paralympics =

- IPC code: AUT
- NPC: Austrian Paralympic Committee
- Website: www.oepc.at (in German)

in Vancouver
- Competitors: 19 in 3 sports
- Flag bearer: Robert Meusburger
- Medals Ranked 7th: Gold 3 Silver 4 Bronze 4 Total 11

Winter Paralympics appearances (overview)
- 1976; 1980; 1984; 1988; 1992; 1994; 1998; 2002; 2006; 2010; 2014; 2018; 2022; 2026

Austria sent delegation to compete at the 2010 Winter Paralympics, in Vancouver. It fielded a total of nineteen athletes, in alpine skiing, biathlon and cross-country skiing.

== Alpine skiing ==
Seventeen athletes participated in the Alpine Ski competitions, with all of the medalists winning medals in the ski events. The medalists are:

- (gold) Claudia Loesch, Women's Super-G, sitting
- (gold) Claudia Loesch, Women's Slalom, sitting
- (gold) Sabine Gasteiger, Women's Slalom, visually impaired
- (silver) Claudia Loesch, Women's Super Combined, sitting
- (silver) Sabine Gasteiger, Women's Giant Slalom, visually impaired
- (silver) Robert Meusburger, Men's Giant Slalom, standing
- (silver) Jurgen Egle, Men's Super Combined, sitting
- (bronze) Claudia Loesch, Women's Downhill, sitting
- (bronze) Hubert Mandl, Men's Super-G, Standing
- (bronze) Philipp Bonadimann, Men's Super Combined, sitting
- (bronze) Philipp Bonadimann, Men's Slalom, sitting

== See also ==
- Austria at the 2010 Winter Olympics
- Austria at the Paralympics
