= Alpine skiing at the 2014 Winter Paralympics – Women's slalom =

Women's slalom at the XI Paralympic Winter Games
- Paralympic alpine skiing
- Venue: Rosa Khutor Alpine Resort, Krasnaya Polyana, Russia
- Dates: 12 March 2014

Women's slalom (visually impaired) at the XI Paralympic Winter Games
- Competitors: 10 from 6 nations

Medalists
1st place, gold medalist(s)		Aleksandra Frantceva; Guide: Pavel Zabotin	Russia
2nd place, silver medalist(s)		Jade Etherington; Guide: Caroline Powell	Great Britain
3rd place, bronze medalist(s)		Henrieta Farkasova; Guide: Natalia Subrtova	Slovakia

Women's slalom (sitting) at the XI Paralympic Winter Games
- Competitors: 11 from 9 nations

Medalists
1st place, gold medalist(s)		Anna Schaffelhuber	Germany
2nd place, silver medalist(s)		Anna-Lena Forster	Germany
3rd place, bronze medalist(s)		Kimberly Joines	Canada

Women's slalom (standing) at the XI Paralympic Winter Games
- Competitors: 18 from 12 nations

Medalists
1st place, gold medalist(s)		Andrea Rothfuss	Germany
2nd place, silver medalist(s)		Inga Medvedeva	Russia
3rd place, bronze medalist(s)		Petra Smarzova	Slovakia

The women's slalom competition of the 2014 Winter Paralympics will be held at Rosa Khutor Alpine Resort near Krasnaya Polyana, Russia. The competition is scheduled for 12 March 2014.

== Medal table ==
* Host nation (Russia)

Rank	Nation	Gold	Silver	Bronze	Total
1	Germany (GER)	2	1	0	3
2	Russia (RUS)*	1	1	0	2
3	Great Britain (GBR)	0	1	0	1
4	Slovakia (SVK)	0	0	2	2
5	Canada (CAN)	0	0	1	1
Totals (5 entries)		3	3	3	9

== Visually impaired ==
In the visually impaired slalom, the athlete with a visual impairment has a sighted guide. The two skiers are considered a team, and dual medals are awarded.

Rank	Bib	Name	Country	Run 1	Rank	Run 2	Rank	Total	Difference
1st place, gold medalist(s)	8	Aleksandra Frantceva; Guide: Pavel Zabotin	Russia	1:01.42	2	59.82	1	2:01.24	
2nd place, silver medalist(s)	1	Jade Etherington; Guide: Caroline Powell	Great Britain	1:00.87	1	1:01.02	3	2:01.89	+0.65
3rd place, bronze medalist(s)	3	Henrieta Farkasova; Guide: Natalia Subrtova	Slovakia	1:02.20	3	1:00.74	2	2:02.94	+1.70
4	5	Danelle Umstead; Guide: Robert Umstead	United States	1:08.74	5	1:07.47	4	2:16.21	+14.97
5	10	Millie Knight; Guide: Rachael Ferrier	Great Britain	1:09.87	6	1:08.90	6	2:18.77	+17.53
6	2	Staci Mannella; Guide: Robert Umstead	United States	1:12.26	7	1:08.79	5	2:21.05	+19.81
7	7	Jessia Gallagher; Guide: Christian Geiger	Australia	1:04.09	4	1:38.46	7	2:42.55	+41.31
	4	Yang Jae Rim; Guide: Lee Ji Youl	South Korea	DNF					
	6	Kelly Gallagher; Guide: Charlotte Evans	Great Britain	DNF					
	9	Melissa Perrine; Guide: Andrew Bor	Australia	DNF					

== Sitting ==
Rank	Bib	Name	Country	Run 1	Rank	Run 2	Rank	Total	Difference
1st place, gold medalist(s)	34	Anna Schaffelhuber	Germany	1:05.07	1	1:04.86	1	2:09.93	-
2nd place, silver medalist(s)	30	Anna-Lena Forster	Germany	1:06.41	2	1:07.94	3	2:14.35	+4.42
3rd place, bronze medalist(s)	29	Kimberly Joines	Canada	1:07.33	3	1:07.83	2	2:15.16	+5.23
4	32	Laurie Stephens	United States	1:08.86	4	1:09.59	5	2:18.45	+8.52
5	31	Claudia Loesch	Austria	1:13.83	5	1:10.72	5	2:24.55	+14.62
6	33	Anna Turney	Great Britain	1:13.94	6	1:14.39	6	2:28.33	+18.40
7	35	Yoshiko Tanaka	Japan	1:18.77	7	1:17.02	7	2:35.79	+25.86
8	36	Victoria Pendergast	Australia	1:21.53	8	1:21.82	8	2:43.35	+33.42
9	37	Momoka Muraoka	Japan	1:29.85	9	1:23.16	9	2:53.01	+43.08
10	39	Erna Fridriksdottir	Iceland	1:33.41	10	1:36.89	10	3:10.30	+1:00.37
	38	Linnea Ottosson Eide	Sweden	DNF					

== Standing ==
Rank	Bib	Name	Country	Run 1	Rank	Run 2	Rank	Total	Difference
1st place, gold medalist(s)	15	Andrea Rothfuss	Germany	59.37	1	1:00.48	1	1:59.85	-
2nd place, silver medalist(s)	12	Inga Medvedeva	Russia	1:03.69	4	1:03.01	3	2:06.70	+6.85
3rd place, bronze medalist(s)	16	Petra Smarzova	Slovakia	1:03.98	5	1:02.93	2	2:06.91	+7.06
4	11	Mariia Papulova	Russia	1:02.83	3	1:06.47	6	2:09.30	+9.45
5	24	Laura Valeanu	Romania	1:05.42	6	1:04.71	4	2:10.13	+10.28
6	20	Alexandra Starker	Canada	1:07.58	7	1:06.58	6	2:14.16	+14.31
7	14	Anna Jochemsen	Netherlands	1:01.82	2	1:13.09	9	2:14.91	+15.06
8	19	Erin Latimer	Canada	1:09.40	8	1:09.91	7	2:19.31	+19.46
9	25	Alana Ramsay	Canada	1:13.91	9	1:10.15	8	2:24.06	+24.21
10	22	Melanie Schwartz	United States	1:17.75	10	1:13.33	10	2:31.08	+31.23
11	26	Anastasia Khorosheva	Russia	1:26.42	11	1:14.79	11	2:41.21	+41.36
12	27	Line Damgaard	Denmark	1:54.94	12	1:58.96	12	3:53.90	+1:54.05
	28	Ilma Kazazic	Bosnia and Herzegovina	DNS					
	13	Allison Jones	United States	DNF					
	17	Katja Saarinen	Finland	DNF					
	18	Stephanie Jallen	United States	DNF					
	21	Ursula Pueyo Marimon	Spain	DNF					
	23	Marie Bochet	France	DNF					

== See also ==
- Alpine skiing at the 2014 Winter Olympics
