= Alpine skiing at the 2014 Winter Paralympics – Women's giant slalom =

Women's giant slalom at the XI Paralympic Winter Games
- Paralympic alpine skiing
- Venue: Rosa Khutor Alpine Resort, Krasnaya Polyana, Russia
- Dates: 16 March 2014

Women's giant slalom (visually impaired) at the XI Paralympic Winter Games
- Competitors: 10 from 6 nations

Medalists
1st place, gold medalist(s)		Henrieta Farkasova; Guide: Natalia Subrtova	Slovakia
2nd place, silver medalist(s)		Aleksandra Frantceva; Guide: Pavel Zabotin	Russia
3rd place, bronze medalist(s)		Jessica Gallagher; Guide: Christian Geiger	Australia

Women's giant slalom (sitting) at the XI Paralympic Winter Games
- Competitors: 12 from 9 nations

Medalists
1st place, gold medalist(s)		Anna Schaffelhuber	Germany
2nd place, silver medalist(s)		Claudia Loesch	Austria
3rd place, bronze medalist(s)		Anna-Lena Forster	Germany

Women's giant slalom (standing) at the XI Paralympic Winter Games
- Competitors: 20 from 13 nations

Medalists
1st place, gold medalist(s)		Marie Bochet	France
2nd place, silver medalist(s)		Andrea Rothfuss	Germany
3rd place, bronze medalist(s)		Solene Jambaque	France

The women's giant slalom competition of the 2014 Winter Paralympics will be held at Rosa Khutor Alpine Resort near Krasnaya Polyana, Russia. The competition is scheduled for 16 March 2014.

== Medal table ==
* Host nation (Russia)

Rank	Nation	Gold	Silver	Bronze	Total
1	Germany (GER)	1	1	1	3
2	France (FRA)	1	0	1	2
3	Slovakia (SVK)	1	0	0	1
4	Austria (AUT)	0	1	0	1
4	Russia (RUS)*	0	1	0	1
6	Australia (AUS)	0	0	1	1
Totals (6 entries)		3	3	3	9

== Visually impaired ==
In the visually impaired giant slalom, the athlete with a visual impairment has a sighted guide. The two skiers are considered a team, and dual medals are awarded.

Rank	Bib	Name	Country	Run 1	Rank	Run 2	Rank	Total	Difference
1st place, gold medalist(s)	1	Henrieta Farkasova; Guide: Natalia Subrtova	Slovakia	1:28.62	1	1:20.01	1	2:48.63	-
2nd place, silver medalist(s)	6	Aleksandra Frantceva; Guide: Pavel Zabotin	Russia	1:33.58	2	1:21.33	2	2:54.91	+6.28
3rd place, bronze medalist(s)	4	Jessica Gallagher; Guide: Christian Geiger	Australia	1:36.69	3	1:25.42	3	3:02.11	+13.48
4	9	Yang Jae Rim; Guide: Lee Ji Youl	South Korea	1:36.82	4	1:29.08	6	3:05.90	+17.27
5	10	Millie Knight; Guide: Rachael Ferrier	Great Britain	1:39.66	5	1:27.68	5	3:07.34	+18.71
6	8	Staci Mannella; Guide: Robert Umstead	United States	1:44.66	6	1:26.11	4	3:10.77	+22.14
	2	Jade Etherington; Guide: Caroline Powell	Great Britain	DNS					
	3	Lindsey Ball; Guide: Diane Barras	United States	DNF					
	5	Kelly Gallagher; Guide: Charlotte Evans	Great Britain	DNF					
	7	Melissa Perrine; Guide: Andrew Bor	Australia	DNF					

== Sitting ==
Rank	Bib	Name	Country	Run 1	Rank	Run 2	Rank	Total	Difference
1st place, gold medalist(s)	35	Anna Schaffelhuber	Germany	1:31.60	2	1:19.66	1	2:51.26	-
2nd place, silver medalist(s)	34	Claudia Loesch	Austria	1:36.09	5	1:19.82	2	2:55.91	+4.65
3rd place, bronze medalist(s)	38	Anna-Lena Forster	Germany	1:35.77	4	1:23.56	3	2:59.33	+8.07
4	31	Alana Nichols	United States	1:33.49	3	1:26.75	7	3:00.24	+8.98
5	32	Momoka Muraoka	Japan	1:37.40	6	1:24.32	4	3:01.72	+10.46
6	36	Laurie Stephens	United States	1:38.26	7	1:26.64	6	3:04.90	+13.64
7	39	Yoshiko Tanaka	Japan	1:47.26	8	1:33.24	8	3:20.50	+29.24
8	37	Anna Turney	Great Britain	1:55.41	11	1:25.35	5	3:20.76	+29.50
9	41	Erna Fridriksdottir	Iceland	1:49.53	9	1:41.66	10	3:31.19	+39.93
10	40	Victoria Pendergast	Australia	1:54.37	10	1:40.22	9	3:34.59	+43.33
11	42	Linnea Ottosson Eide	Sweden	2:13.10	12	1:52.19	11	4:05.29	+1:14.07
	33	Kimberly Joines	Canada	1:30.44	1	DNF			

== Standing ==
Rank	Bib	Name	Country	Run 1	Rank	Run 2	Rank	Total	Difference
1st place, gold medalist(s)	19	Marie Bochet	France	1:24.98	1	1:13.86	1	2:38.84	-
2nd place, silver medalist(s)	11	Andrea Rothfuss	Germany	1:25.36	2	1:14.34	2	2:39.70	+0.86
3rd place, bronze medalist(s)	22	Solene Jambaque	France	1:27.71	3	1:19.10	5	2:46.81	+7.97
4	23	Allison Jones	United States	1:31.65	7	1:16.92	3	2:48.57	+9.73
5	24	Petra Smarzova	Slovakia	1:30.52	4	1:18.95	4	2:49.47	+10.63
6	14	Inga Medvedeva	Russia	1:33.17	8	1:19.77	6	2:52.94	+14.10
7	26	Laura Valeanu	Romania	1:33.96	11	1:20.27	8	2:54.23	+15.39
8	16	Anna Jochemsen	Netherlands	1:34.32	12	1:20.20	7	2:54.52	+15.68
9	20	Erin Latimer	Canada	1:33.42	9	1:22.71	9	2:56.13	+17.29
10	17	Alexandra Starker	Canada	1:33.91	10	1:23.62	11	2:57.53	+18.69
11	13	Ursula Pueyo Marimon	Spain	1:36.26	13	1:22.95	10	2:59.21	+20.37
12	27	Katja Saarinen	Finland	1:40.56	15	1:26.43	12	3:06.99	+28.15
13	28	Anastasia Khorosheva	Russia	1:39.55	14	1:28.27	13	3:07.82	+28.98
14	15	Melanie Schwartz	United States	1:44.46	17	1:28.60	14	3:13.06	+34.22
15	29	Line Damgaard	Denmark	2:08.40	18	1:53.00	15	4:01.40	+1:22.56
	12	Stephanie Jallen	United States	1:30.73	5	DNF			
	21	Mariia Papulova	Russia	1:31.17	6	DNF			
	25	Alana Ramsay	Canada	1:42.09	15	DNF			
	30	Ilma Kazazic	Bosnia and Herzegovina	2:32.64	19	DNF			
	18	Melania Corradini	Italy	DNF					

== See also ==
- Alpine skiing at the 2014 Winter Olympics
