= Alpine skiing at the 2014 Winter Paralympics – Women's combined =

Women's super combined at the XI Paralympic Winter Games
- Paralympic alpine skiing
- Venue: Rosa Khutor Alpine Resort, Krasnaya Polyana, Russia
- Dates: 11 March 2014

Women's super combined (visually impaired) at the XI Paralympic Winter Games
- Competitors: 6 from 5 nations

Medalists
1st place, gold medalist(s)		Aleksandra Frantceva; Guide: Pavel Zabotin	Russia
2nd place, silver medalist(s)		Jade Etherington; Guide: Caroline Powell	Great Britain
3rd place, bronze medalist(s)		Danelle Umstead; Guide: Robert Umstead	United States

Women's super combined (sitting) at the XI Paralympic Winter Games
- Competitors: 5 from 4 nations

Medalists
1st place, gold medalist(s)		Anna Schaffelhuber	Germany
2nd place, silver medalist(s)		Anna-Lena Forster	Germany

Women's super combined (standing) at the XI Paralympic Winter Games
- Competitors: 15 from 9 nations

Medalists
1st place, gold medalist(s)		Marie Bochet	France
2nd place, silver medalist(s)		Andrea Rothfuss	Germany
3rd place, bronze medalist(s)		Stephanie Jallen	United States

The Women's super combined competition of the 2014 Winter Paralympics was held at Rosa Khutor Alpine Resort near Krasnaya Polyana, Russia. The slalom portion of the race was held on 11 March 2014 and poor conditions pushed the Super-G portion of the race to 14 March 2014, reversing the usual order in which the two parts are contested.

== Medal table ==
* Host nation (Russia)

Rank	Nation	Gold	Silver	Bronze	Total
1	Germany (GER)	1	2	0	3
2	France (FRA)	1	0	0	1
2	Russia (RUS)*	1	0	0	1
4	Great Britain (GBR)	0	1	0	1
5	United States (USA)	0	0	2	2
Totals (5 entries)		3	3	2	8

== Visually impaired ==
In the visually impaired giant slalom, the athlete with a visual impairment has a sighted guide. The two skiers are considered a team, and dual medals are awarded.

Rank	Bib	Name	Country	Slalom	Rank	Super-G	Rank	Total	Difference
1st place, gold medalist(s)	2	Aleksandra Frantceva; Guide: Pavel Zabotin	Russia	58.68	1	1:29.07	2	2:27.75	-
2nd place, silver medalist(s)	6	Jade Etherington; Guide: Caroline Powell	Great Britain	1:01.80	2	1:26.58	1	2:28.38	+0.63
3rd place, bronze medalist(s)	5	Danelle Umstead; Guide: Robert Umstead	United States	1:08.48	3	1:33.61	3	2:42.09	+14.34
	3	Kelly Gallagher; Guide: Charlotte Evans	Great Britain	DNF					
	1	Henrieta Farkasova; Guide: Natalia Subrtova	Slovakia	DSQ					
	4	Melissa Perrine; Guide: Andrew Bor	Australia	DSQ					

== Sitting ==
Rank	Bib	Name	Country	Slalom	Rank	Super-G	Rank	Total	Difference
1st place, gold medalist(s)	22	Anna Schaffelhuber	Germany	1:00.73	1	1:32.57	1	2:33.30	-
2nd place, silver medalist(s)	25	Anna-Lena Forster	Germany	1:01.04	2	1:37.92	2	2:38.96	+5.66
	24	Laurie Stephens	United States	1:08.41	4	DNS			
	23	Claudia Loesch	Austria	1:05.12	3	DNF			
	26	Anna Turney	Great Britain	1:19.85	5	DNF			

== Standing ==
Rank	Bib	Name	Country	Slalom	Rank	Super-G	Rank	Total	Difference
1st place, gold medalist(s)	8	Marie Bochet	France	53.48	1	1:24.91	1	2:18.39	-
2nd place, silver medalist(s)	12	Andrea Rothfuss	Germany	55.86	2	1:26.88	3	2:22.74	+4.35
3rd place, bronze medalist(s)	17	Stephanie Jallen	United States	57.98	3	1:25.15	2	2:23.13	+4.74
4	7	Allison Jones	United States	1:01.35	5	1:28.15	4	2:29.50	+11.11
5	9	Inga Medvedeva	Russia	1:00.86	4	1:29.06	5	2:29.92	+11.53
6	11	Petra Smarzova	Slovakia	1:01.55	6	1:37.85	7	2:39.40	+21.01
7	20	Erin Latimer	Canada	1:07.18	8	1:34.67	6	2"41.85	+23.46
	16	Alexandra Starker	Canada	1:06.59	7	DNS			
	13	Melania Corradini	Italy	DNS					
	19	Alana Ramsey	Canada	DNS					
	10	Anna Jochemsen	Netherlands	DNF					
	14	Mariia Papulova	Russia	DNF					
	18	Melanie Schwartz	United States	DNF					
	15	Solène Jambaqué	France	DSQ					
	21	Ursula Pueyo Marimon	Spain	DSQ					

== See also ==
- Alpine skiing at the 2014 Winter Olympics
