= Alpine skiing at the 2014 Winter Paralympics – Women's downhill =

Women's downhill at the XI Paralympic Winter Games
- Paralympic alpine skiing
- Venue: Rosa Khutor Alpine Resort, Krasnaya Polyana, Russia
- Dates: 8 March 2014

Women's downhill (visually impaired) at the XI Paralympic Winter Games
- Competitors: 6 from 5 nations

Medalists
1st place, gold medalist(s)		Henrieta Farkasova; Guide: Natalia Subrtova	Slovakia
2nd place, silver medalist(s)		Jade Etherington; Guide: Caroline Powell	Great Britain
3rd place, bronze medalist(s)		Aleksandra Frantceva; Guide: Pavel Zabotin	Russia

Women's downhill (standing) at the XI Paralympic Winter Games
- Competitors: 8 from 6 nations

Medalists
1st place, gold medalist(s)		Marie Bochet	France
2nd place, silver medalist(s)		Inga Medvedeva	Russia
3rd place, bronze medalist(s)		Allison Jones	United States

Women's downhill (sitting) at the XI Paralympic Winter Games
- Competitors: 6 from 4 nations

Medalists
1st place, gold medalist(s)		Anna Schaffelhuber	Germany
2nd place, silver medalist(s)		Alana Nichols	United States
3rd place, bronze medalist(s)		Laurie Stephens	United States

The women's downhill competition of the 2014 Winter Paralympics was held at Rosa Khutor Alpine Resort near Krasnaya Polyana, Russia. The competition took place on 8 March 2014.

== Medal table ==
* Host nation (Russia)

Rank	Nation	Gold	Silver	Bronze	Total
1	France (FRA)	1	0	0	1
1	Germany (GER)	1	0	0	1
1	Slovakia (SVK)	1	0	0	1
4	United States (USA)	0	1	2	3
5	Russia (RUS)*	0	1	1	2
6	Great Britain (GBR)	0	1	0	1
Totals (6 entries)		3	3	3	9

== Visually impaired ==
In the downhill visually impaired, the athlete with a visual impairment has a sighted guide. The two skiers are considered a team, and dual medals are awarded.

Rank	Bib	Name	Country	Time	Difference
1st place, gold medalist(s)	1	Henrieta Farkasova; Guide: Natalia Subrtova	Slovakia	1:31.55	—
2nd place, silver medalist(s)	4	Jade Etherington; Guide: Caroline Powell	Great Britain	1:34.28	+2.73
3rd place, bronze medalist(s)	3	Aleksandra Frantceva; Guide: Pavel Zabotin	Russia	1:35.78	+4.23
4	6	Melissa Perrine; Guide: Andrew Bor	Australia	1:36.15	+4.60
5	2	Danelle Umstead; Guide: Robert Umstead	United States	1:36.70	+5.15
6	5	Kelly Gallagher; Guide: Charlotte Evans	Great Britain	1:37.36	+5.81

== Standing ==
Rank	Bib	Name	Country	Time	Difference
1st place, gold medalist(s)	11	Marie Bochet	France	1:30.72	—
2nd place, silver medalist(s)	13	Inga Medvedeva	Russia	1:32.19	+1.47
3rd place, bronze medalist(s)	10	Allison Jones	United States	1:34.09	+3.37
4	8	Solène Jambaqué	France	1:34.88	+4.16
5	7	Mariia Papulova	Russia	1:41.37	+10.65
	9	Anna Jochemsen	Netherlands	DNF	
	12	Andrea Rothfuß	Germany	DNF	
	14	Melania Corradini	Italy	DNF	

== Sitting ==
Rank	Bib	Name	Country	Time	Difference
1st place, gold medalist(s)	16	Anna Schaffelhuber	Germany	1:35.55	—
2nd place, silver medalist(s)	15	Alana Nichols	United States	1:35.69	+0.14
3rd place, bronze medalist(s)	18	Laurie Stephens	United States	1:36.94	+1.39
4	20	Anna-Lena Forster	Germany	1:39.71	+4.16
	17	Claudia Loesch	Austria	DNF	
	19	Anna Turney	Great Britain	DNF	

== See also ==
- Alpine skiing at the 2014 Winter Olympics
