= Great Britain at the 2014 Winter Paralympics =

- Flag of the United Kingdom
- IPC code: GBR
- NPC: British Paralympic Association
- Website: www.paralympics.org.uk

in Sochi
- Competitors: 15 in 2 sports
- Flag bearers: Millie Knight (Opening); Jade Etherington (Closing)
- Medals Ranked 10th: Gold 1 Silver 3 Bronze 2 Total 6

Winter Paralympics appearances (overview)
- 1976; 1980; 1984; 1988; 1992; 1994; 1998; 2002; 2006; 2010; 2014; 2018; 2022; 2026

The United Kingdom of Great Britain and Northern Ireland competed at the 2014 Winter Paralympics in Sochi, Russia, held between 7–16 of March 2014. The team was known by it shortened name of Great Britain, for identification purposes.

Great Britain fielded a total of 12 athletes; a team of five in wheelchair curling, and seven athletes in alpine skiing. The three visually impaired skiers competed with a sighted guide, taking the total number of competitors for Great Britain to fifteen.

The 2014 Winter Paralympic Games were the most successful ever for Great Britain, as they won their first gold medal. They also won their largest number of medals at a Winter Paralympics since 1984.

On 9 March 2014 Jade Etherington, with guide Caroline Powell, won silver in the women's visually impaired downhill. On 10 March 2014, they won bronze in the women's visually impaired Super-G. In the same event, Kelly Gallagher and her guide Charlotte Evans won the gold medal, the first for Great Britain at a Winter Paralympics.

On 12 March 2014 Jade Etherington and guide Caroline Powell won another silver in the Women's visually impaired slalom. They won a third silver medal in the Women's combined on 14 March 2014, making them the most successful GB Winter Paralympians. It also meant ParalympicsGB met the high end of the Alpine skiing target of five medals.

On 15 March 2014 the wheelchair curling team won the bronze medal match, beating China 7–3. They had qualified for the playoff rounds in fourth place, losing to China 6–3 in the final match. They lost to Russia 13–4 in the semifinals. The result meant ParalympicsGB met their performance target for wheelchair curling.

== Medallists ==
Medals by date
Day	Date	1st place, gold medalist(s)	2nd place, silver medalist(s)	3rd place, bronze medalist(s)	Total
Day 1	8 March	0	1	0	1
Day 2	9 March	0	0	0	0
Day 3	10 March	1	0	1	2
Day 4	11 March	0	0	0	0
Day 5	12 March	0	1	0	1
Day 6	13 March	0	0	0	0
Day 7	14 March	0	1	0	1
Day 8	15 March	0	0	1	1
Day 9	16 March	0	0	0	0
Total		1	3	2	6

Medal	Name	Sport	Event	Classification	Date
Gold	Kelly Gallagher; Guide: Charlotte Evans	Alpine skiing	Women's super-G	Visually impaired	10 March
Silver	Jade Etherington; Guide: Caroline Powell	Alpine skiing	Women's downhill	Visually impaired	8 March
Silver	Jade Etherington; Guide: Caroline Powell	Alpine skiing	Women's slalom	Visually impaired	12 March
Silver	Jade Etherington; Guide: Caroline Powell	Alpine skiing	Women's combined	Visually impaired	14 March
Bronze	Jade Etherington; Guide: Caroline Powell	Alpine skiing	Women's super-G	Visually impaired	10 March
Bronze	Aileen Neilson (skip); Gregor Ewan; Jim Gault; Angie Malone; Bob McPherson	Wheelchair curling	Team	Wheelchair	15 March

Medals by sport
Sport	1st place, gold medalist(s)	2nd place, silver medalist(s)	3rd place, bronze medalist(s)	Total
Alpine skiing	1	3	1	5
Wheelchair curling	0	0	1	1
Total	1	3	2	6

== Medal and performance targets ==
On 16 January 2014, the funding body UK Sport announced their medal targets for ParalympicsGB at the 2014 Winter Paralympic Games in Sochi. The target was set at two medals; although the funding body predicted that Great Britain had the potential to win as many as six medals, this total was not widely expected to be reached. On 15 March, the penultimate day of the Games, that 6 medal 'stretch target' was nonetheless achieved, following the success of the wheelchair curling team in its bronze medal match against China.

Key	✗ Target missed	✓ Target met

Sport	Medal target set	Non medal target	Results	Performance relative to target range
Alpine skiing	2–5	—	5 medals (gold) (silver) (silver) (silver) (bronze)	✓
Wheelchair curling	0–1	Top four	3rd place, bronze medalist(s)	✓
Total	2–6	—	6 medals	✓
Total gold	—	—	1	—

=== UK Sport funding ===
In the Winter Paralympic Cycle running from 2010 to 2014 the UK government body UK Sport allocated a budget of over three quarters of a million to fund ParalympicsGB for the individual athletes as well as the wheelchair curling team for the 2014 Winter Paralympics in Sochi.

Sport	Funding
Alping skiing	£405,400
Wheelchair curling	£350,200
Total	£755,600

== Alpine skiing ==
Britain's alpine skiing team consisted of seven competitors. In the visually impaired categories Kelly Gallagher, Jade Etherington and Millie Knight represented Britain, racing with their respective guides, Charlotte Evans, Caroline Powell and Rachael Ferrier.

Great Britain was represented in the sit-skiing category by Mick Brennan, Ben Sneesby and Anna Turney, while James Whitley was the sole British competitor in the standing events.

=== Women ===
Athlete	Classification	Event	Run 1			Run 2			Final/Total		
Athlete	Classification	Event	Time	Diff	Rank	Time	Diff	Rank	Time	Diff	Rank
Jade Etherington; Guide: Caroline Powell	Visually impaired	Downhill	—N/a						1:34.28	+2.73	2nd place, silver medalist(s)
Jade Etherington; Guide: Caroline Powell	Visually impaired	Super-G	—N/a						1:29.76	+1.04	3rd place, bronze medalist(s)
Jade Etherington; Guide: Caroline Powell	Visually impaired	Super combined	1:01.80	+3.12	2	1:26.58	—	1	2:28.38	+0.63	2nd place, silver medalist(s)
Jade Etherington; Guide: Caroline Powell	Visually impaired	Slalom	1:00.87	—	1	1:01.02	+1.20	3	2:01.89	+0.65	2nd place, silver medalist(s)
Jade Etherington; Guide: Caroline Powell	Visually impaired	Giant slalom	DNS			Did not advance					
Kelly Gallagher; Guide: Charlotte Evans	Visually impaired	Downhill	—N/a						1:37.36	+5.81	6
Kelly Gallagher; Guide: Charlotte Evans	Visually impaired	Super-G	—N/a						1:28.72	—	1st place, gold medalist(s)
Kelly Gallagher; Guide: Charlotte Evans	Visually impaired	Super combined	DNF			Did not advance					
Kelly Gallagher; Guide: Charlotte Evans	Visually impaired	Slalom	DNF			Did not advance					
Kelly Gallagher; Guide: Charlotte Evans	Visually impaired	Giant slalom	DNF			Did not advance					
Millie Knight; Guide: Rachael Ferrier	Visually impaired	Slalom	1:09.87	+9.00	6	1:08.90	+9.08	6	2:18.77	+17.53	5
Millie Knight; Guide: Rachael Ferrier	Visually impaired	Giant slalom	1:39.66	+11.04	5	1:27.68	+7.67	5	3:07.34	+18.71	5
Anna Turney	Sitting	Downhill	—N/a						DNF		
Anna Turney	Sitting	Super-G	—N/a						1:35.27	+6.16	4
Anna Turney	Sitting	Super combined	1:19.85	+19.12	5	DNF					
Anna Turney	Sitting	Slalom	1:13.94	+8.87	6	1:14.39	+9.53	6	2:28.33	+18.40	6
Anna Turney	Sitting	Giant slalom	1:55.41	+24.97	11	1:25.35	+5.69	5	3:20.76	+29.50	8

=== Men ===
Athlete	Classification	Event	Run 1			Run 2			Final/Total		
Athlete	Classification	Event	Time	Diff	Rank	Time	Diff	Rank	Time	Diff	Rank
Mick Brennan	Sitting	Super-G	—N/a						1:30.48	+10.97	10
Mick Brennan	Sitting	Super combined	1:14.85	+16.14	9	1:25.89	+7.62	7	2:40.74	+22.54	8
Mick Brennan	Sitting	Slalom	DSQ			Did not advance					
Mick Brennan	Sitting	Giant slalom	1:23.79	+5.69	14	1:21.09	+6.99	14	2:44.88	+12.15	14
Ben Sneesby	Sitting	Slalom	1:01.62	+8.88	17	1:03.68	+4.25	11	2:05.30	+11.52	11
Ben Sneesby	Sitting	Giant slalom	1:26.96	+8.86	21	DNF			did not advance		
James Whitley	Standing	Slalom	54.84	+7.15	20	58.59	+7.31	15	1:53.43	+14.46	15
James Whitley	Standing	Giant slalom	1:24.64	+9.92	20	1:18.14	+6.99	13	2:42.78	4+16.91	14

== Wheelchair curling ==
In wheelchair curling, Great Britain's team was Aileen Neilson, Jim Gault, Gregor Ewan, Bob McPherson and Angie Malone. Tom Killin was initially named in the squad, but had to be replaced by Jim Gault just before the start of the competition, as an illness meant doctors advised him not to travel.

=== Round Robin ===
==== Standings ====
Final round robin standings
Team	Skip	Pld	W	L	PF	PA	Qualification
Russia	Andrei Smirnov	9	8	1	60	38	Playoffs
Canada	Jim Armstrong	9	7	2	66	42	Playoffs
China	Wang Haitao	9	5	4	54	45	Playoffs
Great Britain	Aileen Neilson	9	5	4	53	56	Playoffs
United States	Patrick McDonald	9	4	5	56	52	
Slovakia	Radoslav Ďuriš	9	4	5	47	68	
Sweden	Jalle Jungnell	9	4	5	59	49	
Norway	Rune Lorentsen	9	3	6	47	62	
South Korea	Kim Myung-jin	9	3	6	41	74	
Finland	Markku Karjalainen	9	2	7	61	58	

==== Results ====
Great Britain had a bye in draws 2, 5 and 10.

Draw 1

Sheet C	1	2	3	4	5	6	7	8	Final
Canada (Armstrong) 🔨	0	0	2	0	1	1	1	1	6
Great Britain (Neilson)	1	1	0	1	0	0	0	0	3

Draw 3

Sheet B	1	2	3	4	5	6	7	8	Final
Sweden (Jungnell)	0	0	1	0	3	0	0	0	4
Great Britain (Neilson) 🔨	1	0	0	1	0	2	1	1	6

Draw 4

Sheet D	1	2	3	4	5	6	7	8	Final
Great Britain (Neilson)	1	1	1	0	0	0	5	X	8
South Korea (Kim) 🔨	0	0	0	2	1	1	0	X	4

Draw 6

Sheet A	1	2	3	4	5	6	7	8	Final
Slovakia (Ďuriš) 🔨	2	0	0	0	0	0	0	X	2
Great Britain (Neilson)	0	2	1	2	1	4	2	X	12

Draw 7

Sheet C	1	2	3	4	5	6	7	8	Final
Great Britain (Neilson)	0	0	1	0	0	3	0	X	4
Finland (Karjalainen) 🔨	1	4	0	3	5	0	0	X	13

Draw 8

Sheet B	1	2	3	4	5	6	7	8	Final
Norway (Lorentsen) 🔨	0	1	0	0	0	2	0	X	3
Great Britain (Neilson)	1	0	1	1	1	0	3	X	7

Draw 9

Sheet D	1	2	3	4	5	6	7	8	Final
Russia (Smirnov) 🔨	0	2	2	0	2	0	5	X	11
Great Britain (Neilson)	0	0	0	1	0	1	0	X	2

Draw 11

Sheet B	1	2	3	4	5	6	7	8	EE	Final
Great Britain (Neilson)	0	0	1	0	1	0	5	0	1	8
United States (McDonald) 🔨	2	1	0	2	0	1	0	1	0	7

Draw 12

Sheet A	1	2	3	4	5	6	7	8	Final
Great Britain (Neilson)	0	0	1	0	0	1	1	X	3
China (Wang) 🔨	1	1	0	3	1	0	0	X	6

=== Playoffs ===
Semifinal

Team	1	2	3	4	5	6	7	8	Final
Russia (Smirnov) 🔨	1	3	0	7	1	0	1	X	13
Great Britain (Neilson)	0	0	3	0	0	1	0	X	4

Bronze-medal game

Team	1	2	3	4	5	6	7	8	Final
Great Britain (Neilson)	0	0	2	2	1	1	1	X	7
China (Wang) 🔨	1	2	0	0	0	0	0	X	3

== See also ==
- Great Britain at the 2014 Winter Olympics
