= Alpine skiing at the 2014 Winter Paralympics – Women's super-G =

Women's super-G at the XI Paralympic Winter Games
- Paralympic alpine skiing
- Venue: Rosa Khutor Alpine Resort, Krasnaya Polyana, Russia
- Dates: 10 March

Women's super-G (visually impaired) at the XI Paralympic Winter Games
- Competitors: 6 from 5 nations

Medalists
1st place, gold medalist(s)		Kelly Gallagher; Guide: Charlotte Evans	Great Britain
2nd place, silver medalist(s)		Aleksandra Frantceva; Guide: Pavel Zabotin	Russia
3rd place, bronze medalist(s)		Jade Etherington; Guide: Caroline Powell	Great Britain

Women's downhill (standing) at the XI Paralympic Winter Games
- Competitors: 15 from 9 nations

Medalists
1st place, gold medalist(s)		Marie Bochet	France
2nd place, silver medalist(s)		Solène Jambaqué	France
3rd place, bronze medalist(s)		Stephanie Jallen	United States

Women's downhill (sitting) at the XI Paralympic Winter Games
- Competitors: 8 from 5 nations

Medalists
1st place, gold medalist(s)		Anna Schaffelhuber	Germany
2nd place, silver medalist(s)		Claudia Loesch	Austria
3rd place, bronze medalist(s)		Laurie Stephens	United States

The women's super-G competition of the 2014 Winter Paralympics was held at Rosa Khutor Alpine Resort near Krasnaya Polyana, Russia. The competition was scheduled for 10 March 2014.

== Medal table ==
* Host nation (Russia)

Rank	Nation	Gold	Silver	Bronze	Total
1	France (FRA)	1	1	0	2
2	Great Britain (GBR)	1	0	1	2
3	Germany (GER)	1	0	0	1
4	Austria (AUT)	0	1	0	1
4	Russia (RUS)*	0	1	0	1
6	United States (USA)	0	0	2	2
Totals (6 entries)		3	3	3	9

== Visually impaired ==
In the visually impaired super-G, the athlete with a visual impairment has a sighted guide. The two skiers are considered a team, and dual medals are awarded.

Rank	Bib	Name	Country	Time	Difference
1st place, gold medalist(s)	1	Kelly Gallagher; Guide: Charlotte Evans	Great Britain	1:28.72	
2nd place, silver medalist(s)	3	Aleksandra Frantceva; Guide: Pavel Zabotin	Russia	1:28.94	+0.22
3rd place, bronze medalist(s)	2	Jade Etherington; Guide: Caroline Powell	Great Britain	1:29.76	+1.04
4	4	Danelle Umstead; Guide: Robert Umstead	United States	1:32.04	+3.32
	6	Melissa Perrine; Guide: Andrew Bor	Australia	DNF	
	5	Henrieta Farkasova; Guide: Natalia Subrtova	Slovakia	DSQ	

== Standing ==
Rank	Bib	Name	Country	Time	Difference
1st place, gold medalist(s)	18	Marie Bochet	France	1:24.20	
2nd place, silver medalist(s)	17	Solène Jambaqué	France	1:26.20	+2.00
3rd place, bronze medalist(s)	15	Stephanie Jallen	United States	1:30.14	+5.94
4	10	Allison Jones	United States	1:30.66	+6.46
5	19	Mariia Papulova	Russia	1:31.53	+7.33
6	16	Anna Jochemsen	Netherlands	1:35.23	+11.03
7	14	Alexandra Starker	Canada	1:36.52	+12.32
8	12	Melania Corradini	Italy	1:38.57	+14.37
9	11	Melanie Schwartz	United States	1:40.27	+16.07
10	20	Alana Ramsay	Canada	1:43.39	+19.19
	8	Erin Latimer	Canada	DNF	
	9	Petra Smarzova	Slovakia	DNF	
	13	Andrea Rothfuss	Germany	DNF	
	21	Ursula Pueyo Marimon	Spain	DNF	
	7	Inga Medvedeva	Russia	DSQ	

== Sitting ==
Rank	Bib	Name	Country	Time	Difference
1st place, gold medalist(s)	23	Anna Schaffelhuber	Germany	1:29.11	
2nd place, silver medalist(s)	27	Claudia Loesch	Austria	1:31.20	+2.09
3rd place, bronze medalist(s)	26	Laurie Stephens	United States	1:32.09	+2.98
4	24	Anna Turney	Great Britain	1:35.27	+6.16
	22	Alana Nichols	United States	DNF	
	25	Stephani Victor	United States	DNF	
	28	Anna-Lena Forster	Germany	DNF	
	29	Momoka Muraoka	Japan	DSQ	

== See also ==
- Alpine skiing at the 2014 Winter Paralympics
- Alpine skiing at the 2014 Winter Olympics
