= Alpine skiing at the 2014 Winter Paralympics – Men's combined =

Men's super combined at the XI Paralympic Winter Games
- Paralympic alpine skiing
- Venue: Rosa Khutor Alpine Resort, Krasnaya Polyana, Russia
- Dates: 11 March 2014

Men's super combined (visually impaired) at the XI Paralympic Winter Games
- Competitors: 14 from 8 nations

Medalists
1st place, gold medalist(s)		Valerii Redkozubov; Guide: Evgeny Geroev	Russia
2nd place, silver medalist(s)		Mark Bathum; Guide: Cade Yamamoto	United States
3rd place, bronze medalist(s)		Gabriel Juan Gorce Yepes; Guide: Josep Arnau Ferrer Ventura	Spain

Men's super combined (sitting) at the XI Paralympic Winter Games
- Competitors: 26 from 13 nations

Medalists
1st place, gold medalist(s)		Josh Dueck	Canada
2nd place, silver medalist(s)		Heath Calhoun	United States
3rd place, bronze medalist(s)		Roman Rabl	Austria

Men's super combined (standing) at the XI Paralympic Winter Games
- Competitors: 25 from 12 nations

Medalists
1st place, gold medalist(s)		Alexey Bugaev	Russia
2nd place, silver medalist(s)		Matthias Lanzinger	Austria
3rd place, bronze medalist(s)		Toby Kane	Australia

The Men's super combined competition of the 2014 Winter Paralympics will be held at Rosa Khutor Alpine Resort near Krasnaya Polyana, Russia. The Super-G portion of the race was held on 11 March 2014 and poor conditions pushed the slalom portion of the race to 14 March 2014.

== Medal table ==
* Host nation (Russia)

Rank	Nation	Gold	Silver	Bronze	Total
1	Russia (RUS)*	2	0	0	2
2	Canada (CAN)	1	0	0	1
3	United States (USA)	0	2	0	2
4	Austria (AUT)	0	1	1	2
5	Australia (AUS)	0	0	1	1
5	Spain (ESP)	0	0	1	1
Totals (6 entries)		3	3	3	9

== Visually impaired ==
In the visually impaired giant slalom, the athlete with a visual impairment has a sighted guide. The two skiers are considered a team, and dual medals are awarded.

Rank	Bib	Name	Country	Slalom	Rank	Super-G	Rank	Total	Difference
1st place, gold medalist(s)	30	Valerii Redkozubov; Guide: Evgeny Geroev	Russia	50.60	1	1:25.27	4	2:15.87	-
2nd place, silver medalist(s)	34	Mark Bathum; Guide: Cade Yamamoto	United States	59.92	5	1:17.46	1	2:17.38	+1.51
3rd place, bronze medalist(s)	29	Gabriel Juan Gorce Yepes; Guide: Josep Arnau Ferrer Ventura	Spain	56.22	2	1:24.14	3	2:20.36	+4.49
4	36	Radomir Dudas; Guide: Michal Cerven	Slovakia	57.44	4	1:23.91	2	2:21.35	+5.48
5	38	Maciej Krezel; Guide: Anna Ogarzynska	Poland	56.49	3	1:26.09	5	2:22.58	+6.71
6	37	Michal Beladic; Guide: Filip Motyka	Slovakia	1:02.68	6	1:29.52	6	2:32.20	+16.33
7	40	Patrik Hetmer; Guide: Miroslav Macala	Czech Republic	1:14.69	7	1:36.61	7	2:51.30	+35.43
	28	Jakub Krako; Guide: Martin Motyka	Slovakia	DNF					
	31	Mac Marcoux; Guide: Robin Femy	Canada	DNF					
	32	Yon Santacana Maiztegui; Guide: Miguel Galindo Garces	Spain	DNF					
	33	Alessandro Daldoss; Guide: Luca Negrini	Italy	DNF					
	35	Ivan Frantsev; Guide: German Agranovskii	Russia	DNF					
	39	Marek Kubacka; Guide: Natalia Karpisova	Slovakia	DNF					
	27	Miroslav Haraus; Guide: Maros Hudik	Slovakia	DSQ					

== Sitting ==
Rank	Bib	Name	Country	Slalom	Rank	Super-G	Rank	Total	Difference
1st place, gold medalist(s)	71	Josh Dueck	Canada	59.93	5	1:18.27	1	2:18.20	-
2nd place, silver medalist(s)	80	Heath Calhoun	United States	59.66	4	1:19.43	4	2:19.09	+0.89
3rd place, bronze medalist(s)	74	Roman Rabl	Austria	58.71	1	1:21.49	5	2:20.20	+2.00
4	84	Corey Peters	New Zealand	1:03.24	6	1:18.67	2	2:21.91	+3.71
5	67	Thomas Nolte	Germany	59.25	2	1:22.93	6	2:22.18	+3.98
6	78	Kenji Natsume	Japan	1:08.76	8	1:19.28	3	2:28.04	+9.84
7	81	Akira Taniguchi	Japan	1:08.60	7	1:26.11	8	2:34.71	+16.51
8	88	Mick Brennan	Great Britain	1:14.85	9	1:25.89	7	2:40.74	+22.54
9	90	Thomas Jacobsen	Norway	1:17.16	10	1:30.93	9	2:48.09	+29.89
	73	Taiki Morii	Japan	59.52	3	DNF			
	91	Maurizio Nicoli	Switzerland	DNS					
	66	Dietmar Dorn	Austria	DNF					
	68	Frederic Francois	France	DNF					
	69	Cyril More	France	DNF					
	72	Yohann Taberlet	France	DNF					
	75	Akira Kano	Japan	DNF					
	76	Takeshi Suzuki	Japan	DNF					
	77	Caleb Brousseau	Canada	DNF					
	79	Jasmin Bambur	United States	DNF					
	82	Georg Kreiter	Germany	DNF					
	83	Dino Sokolovic	Croatia	DNF					
	85	Kurt Oatway	Canada	DNF					
	86	Oldrich Jelinek	Czech Republic	DNF					
	87	Christoph Kunz	Switzerland	DNF					
	70	Philipp Bonadiman	Austria	DSQ					
	89	Park Jong-Seork	South Korea	DSQ					

== Standing ==
Rank	Bib	Name	Country	Slalom	Rank	Super-G	Rank	Total	Difference
1st place, gold medalist(s)	48	Alexey Bugaev	Russia	50.30	1	1:19.42	2	2:09.72	-
2nd place, silver medalist(s)	44	Matthias Lanzinger	Austria	52.43	3	1:18.39	1	2:10.82	+1.10
3rd place, bronze medalist(s)	52	Toby Kane	Australia	53.52	5	1:20.62	3	2:14.14	+4.42
4	56	Adam Hall	New Zealand	53.00	4	1:21.36	5	2:14.36	4.64
5	51	Mitchell Gourley	Australia	53.63	6	1:20.75	4	2:14.38	+4.66
6	45	Cedric Amafroi-Broisat	France	54.64	9	1:21.60	7	2:16.24	+6.52
7	59	Martin Wuerz	Austria	54.55	8	1:23.39	10	2:17.94	+8.22
8	58	Martin France	Slovakia	57.09	14	1:21.55	6	2:18.64	+8.92
9	47	Hiraku Misawa	Japan	56.03	11	1:22.63	8	2:18.66	+8.94
10	46	Gakuta Koike	Japan	56.52	12	1:22.96	9	2:19.48	+9.76
11	60	Thomas Grochar	Austria	55.46	10	1:25.92	14	2:21.38	+11.66
12	57	Kirk Schornstein	Canada	57.62	17	1:24.45	11	2:22.07	+12.35
13	61	James Stanton	United States	57.44	15	1:25.21	13	2:22.65	+12.93
14	64	Hansjörg Lantschner	Italy	1:05.88	18	1:24.78	12	2:30.66	+20.94
	49	Michael Brügger	Switzerland	57.56	16	DNS			
	55	Thomas Pfyl	Switzerland	56.92	13	DNS			
	41	Romain Riboud	France	54.38	7	DNF			
	43	Braydon Luscombe	Canada	52.17	2	DNF			
	42	Alexander Alyabyev	Russia	DNF					
	50	Vincent Gauthier-Manuel	France	DNF					
	53	Alexander Vetrov	Russia	DNF					
	54	Matt Hallat	Canada	DNF					
	62	Christophe Brodard	Switzerland	DNF					
	63	Andrzej Szczesny	Poland	DNF					
	65	Jochi Röthlisberger	Switzerland	DNF					

== See also ==
- Alpine skiing at the 2014 Winter Olympics
