= 2014 Winter Paralympics Parade of Nations =

During the Parade of Nations, at the opening ceremony of the 2014 Winter Paralympics, athletes from each participating country paraded in the Fisht Olympic Stadium, preceded by its flag. The flag was borne by a sportsperson from that country chosen either by the National Paralympic Committee or by the athletes themselves.

== Parade order ==
All nations paraded in alphabetical order of the Russian alphabet except the host country, the Russian Federation, who entered last.

== Countries and flag bearers ==
The following is a list of all parading countries with their respective flag bearer, sorted in the order they appeared in the parade. This is sortable by country name under which they entered, the flag bearer's name, or the flag bearer's sport. Names are given as were officially designated by the IPC.

Order	Country	Russian	Romanisation	Flag bearer	Sport
1	Australia (AUS)	Австралия	Avstraliya	Cameron Rahles-Rahbula	Alpine skiing
2	Austria (AUT)	Австрия	Avstriya	Philipp Bonadimann	Alpine skiing
3	Andorra (AND)	Андорра	Andorra	Xavier Fernandez	Alpine skiing
4	Argentina (ARG)	Аргентина	Argentina	Pablo Javier Robledo	Nordic skiing
5	Armenia (ARM)	Армения	Armeniya	Mher Avanesyan	Alpine skiing
6	Belarus (BLR)	Республика Беларусь	Respublika Belarus’	Yadviha Skorabahataya	Nordic skiing
7	Belgium (BEL)	Бельгия	Bel'giya	Denis Colle	Snowboarding
8	Bulgaria (BUL)	Болгария	Bolgariya	Svetoslav Georgiev	Nordic skiing
9	Bosnia and Herzegovina (BIH)	Босния и Герцеговина	Bosniya i Gertsegovina	Ilma Kazazic	Alpine skiing
10	Brazil (BRA)	Бразилия	Braziliya	André Pereira	Snowboarding
11	Great Britain (GBR)	Великобритания	Velikobritaniya	Millie Knight	Alpine skiing
12	Germany (GER)	Германия	Germania	Andrea Rothfuß	Alpine skiing
13	Greece (GRE)	Греция	Gretsiya	Efthymios Kalaras	Alpine skiing
14	Denmark (DEN)	Дания	Daniya	Ulrik Nyvold	Alpine skiing
15	Iran (IRI)	Иран	Iran	Sadegh Kalhor	Alpine skiing
16	Iceland (ISL)	Исландия	Islandiya	Erna Fridriksdottir	Alpine skiing
17	Spain (ESP)	Испания	Ispaniya	Jon Santacana Maiztegui	Alpine skiing
18	Italy (ITA)	Италия	Italiya	Andrea Chiarotti	Ice sledge hockey
19	Kazakhstan (KAZ)	Казахстан	Kazakhstan	Yerlan Omarov	Nordic skiing
20	Canada (CAN)	Канада	Kanada	Sonja Gaudet	Wheelchair curling
21	China (CHN)	Китайская Народная Республика	Kitaiskaya Narodnaya Respublika	Tian Ye	Nordic skiing
22	Mexico (MEX)	Мексика	Meksika	Arly Velásquez	Alpine skiing
23	Mongolia (MGL)	Монголия	Mongoliya	Batmönkhiin Ganbold	Nordic skiing
24	Netherlands (NED)	Нидерланды	Niderlandy	Bibian Mentel-Spee	Snowboarding
25	New Zealand (NZL)	Новая Зеландия	Novaya Zelandiya	Adam Hall	Alpine skiing
26	Norway (NOR)	Норвегия	Norvegiya	Mariann Marthinsen	Nordic skiing
27	Poland (POL)	Польша	Pol'sha	Maciej Krezel	Alpine skiing
28	South Korea (KOR)	Республика Корея	Respublika Koreya	Jung Seung-Hwan	Ice sledge hockey
29	Romania (ROU)	Румыния	Rumyniya	Laura Valeanu	Alpine skiing
30	Serbia (SRB)	Сербия	Serbiya	Jugoslav Milosevic	Alpine skiing
31	Slovakia (SVK)	Словакия	Slovakiya	Jakub Krako	Alpine skiing
32	Slovenia (SLO)	Словения	Sloveniya	Gal Jakic	Alpine skiing
33	United States (USA)	Соединенные Штаты Америки	Soyedinennye Shtaty Ameriki	Jonathan Lujan	Alpine skiing
34	Turkey (TUR)	Турция	Turtsiya	Mehmet Çekiç	Alpine skiing
35	Uzbekistan (UZB)	Узбекистан	Uzbekistan	Ramil Gayazov	Alpine skiing
36	Ukraine (UKR)	Украина	Ukraina	Mykhaylo Tkachenko	Nordic skiing
37	Finland (FIN)	Финляндия	Finlyandiya	Katja Saarinen	Alpine skiing
38	France (FRA)	Франция	Frantsiya	Vincent Gauthier-Manuel	Alpine skiing
39	Croatia (CRO)	Хорватия	Horvatiya	Dino Sokolovic	Alpine skiing
40	Czech Republic (CZE)	Чехия	Chekhiya	Stanislav Loska	Alpine skiing
41	Chile (CHI)	Чили	Chili	Jorge Migueles	Alpine skiing
42	Switzerland (SUI)	Швейцария	Shveitsariya	Christoph Kunz	Alpine skiing
43	Sweden (SWE)	Швеция	Shvetsiya	Jalle Jungnell	Wheelchair curling
44	Japan (JPN)	Япония	Yaponiya	Shoko Ota	Nordic skiing
45	Russia (RUS)	Российская Федерaция	Rossiyskaya Federatsiya	Valerii Redkobuzov	Alpine skiing

== See also ==
- 2014 Winter Olympics Parade of Nations
