= Slovakia at the 2014 Winter Paralympics =

- IPC code: SVK
- NPC: Slovak Paralympic Committee
- Website: www.spv.sk

in Sochi
- Competitors: 16 in 4 sports
- Flag bearer: Jakub Krako
- Medals Ranked 6th: Gold 3 Silver 2 Bronze 2 Total 7

Winter Paralympics appearances (overview)
- 1994; 1998; 2002; 2006; 2010; 2014; 2018; 2022; 2026

Other related appearances
- Czechoslovakia (1976–1992)

Slovakia competed at the 2014 Winter Paralympics in Sochi, Russia, held between 7–16 March 2014.

== Medalists ==
Medal	Name	Sport	Event	Date
Gold	Henrieta Farkašová; Guide: Natalia Subrtova	Alpine skiing	Women's downhill	8 March
Gold	Henrieta Farkašová; Guide: Natalia Subrtova	Alpine skiing	Women's giant slalom	16 March
Gold	Jakub Krako; Guide: Martin Motyka	Alpine skiing	Men's super-G	9 March
Silver	Jakub Krako; Guide: Martin Motyka	Alpine skiing	Men's giant slalom	15 March
Silver	Miroslav Haraus; Guide: Maros Hudik	Alpine skiing	Men's downhill	8 March
Bronze	Henrieta Farkašová; Guide: Natalia Subrtova	Alpine skiing	Women's slalom	12 March
Bronze	Petra Smarzova	Alpine skiing	Women's slalom	12 March

== Alpine skiing ==
Men

Athlete	Event	Run 1			Run 2			Final/Total		
Athlete	Event	Time	Diff	Rank	Time	Diff	Rank	Time	Diff	Rank
Michal Beladic; Guide: Filip Motyka	Downhill, visually impaired	—N/a						1:35.98	+14.22	11
Michal Beladic; Guide: Filip Motyka	Super-G, visually impaired	—N/a						1:29.30	+8.72	8
Michal Beladic; Guide: Filip Motyka	Combined, visually impaired	1:02.68	+12.08	6	1:29.52	+12.06	6	2:32.20	+16.33	6
Michal Beladic; Guide: Filip Motyka	Slalom, visually impaired	56.85	+7.16	11	1:02.56	+9.04	8	1:59.41	+16.20	7
Michal Beladic; Guide: Filip Motyka	Giant slalom, visually impaired	1:26.95	+10.93	13	1:20.11	+6.86	10	2:47.06	+17.44	11
Radomir Dudas; Guide: Michal Cerven	Downhill, visually impaired	—N/a						1:33.37	+11.61	10
Radomir Dudas; Guide: Michal Cerven	Super-G, visually impaired	—N/a						1:31.51	+10.93	9
Radomir Dudas; Guide: Michal Cerven	Combined, visually impaired	57.44	+6.84	4	1:23.91	+6.45	2	2:21.35	+5.48	4
Radomir Dudas; Guide: Michal Cerven	Slalom, visually impaired	56.93	+7.24	12	57.53	+4.01	5	1:54.46	+11.25	6
Radomir Dudas; Guide: Michal Cerven	Giant slalom, visually impaired	1:23.31	+7.29	9	1:20.11	+6.86	10	2:43.42	+13.80	10
Martin France	Super-G, standing	—N/a						1:25.50	+4.58	8
Martin France	Combined, standing	57.09	+6.79	14	1:21.55	+3.16	6	2:18.64	+8.92	8
Martin France	Slalom, standing	55.77	+8.08	22	57.37	+6.09	11	1:53.14	+14.17	14
Martin France	Giant slalom, standing	1:18.74	+4.02	6	1:12.92	+1.77	4	2:31.66	+5.79	4
Miroslav Haraus; Guide: Maros Hudik	Downhill, visually impaired	—N/a						1:22.01	+0.25	2nd place, silver medalist(s)
Miroslav Haraus; Guide: Maros Hudik	Super-G, visually impaired	—N/a						DNF		
Miroslav Haraus; Guide: Maros Hudik	Slalom, visually impaired	50.34	+0.65	4	DSQ					
Miroslav Haraus; Guide: Maros Hudik	Giant slalom, visually impaired	1:22.99	+6.97	8	DNF					
Jakub Krako; Guide: Martin Motyka	Downhill, visually impaired	—N/a						1:23.38	+1.62	4
Jakub Krako; Guide: Martin Motyka	Super-G, visually impaired	—N/a						1:20.58	-	1st place, gold medalist(s)
Jakub Krako; Guide: Martin Motyka	Slalom, visually impaired	50.18	+0.49	=2	DNF					
Jakub Krako; Guide: Martin Motyka	Giant slalom, visually impaired	1:18.41	+2.39	2	1:13.25	-	1	2:31.66	+2.04	2nd place, silver medalist(s)
Marek Kubacka; Guide: Natalia Karpisova	Super-G, visually impaired	—N/a						DNF		
Marek Kubacka; Guide: Natalia Karpisova	slalom, visually impaired	DNF								
Marek Kubacka; Guide: Natalia Karpisova	Giant slalom, visually impaired	1:24.69	+8.67	11	1:17.83	+4.58	7	2:42.52	+12.90	8

Women

Athlete	Event	Run 1			Run 2			Final/Total		
Athlete	Event	Time	Diff	Rank	Time	Diff	Rank	Time	Diff	Rank
Henrieta Farkasova; Guide: Natalia Subrtova	Downhill, visually impaired	—N/a						1:31.55	-	1st place, gold medalist(s)
Henrieta Farkasova; Guide: Natalia Subrtova	Super-G, visually impaired	—N/a						DSQ		
Henrieta Farkasova; Guide: Natalia Subrtova	Slalom, visually impaired	1:02.20	+1.33	3	1:00.74	+0.92	2	2:02.94	+1.70	3rd place, bronze medalist(s)
Henrieta Farkasova; Guide: Natalia Subrtova	Giant slalom, visually impaired	1:28.62	-	1	1:20.01	-	1	2:48.63	-	1st place, gold medalist(s)
Petra Smarzova	Super-G, standing	—N/a						DNF		
Petra Smarzova	Combined, standing	—N/a						DNF		
Petra Smarzova	Slalom, standing	1:03.98	+4.61	5	1:02.93	+2.45	2	2:06.91	+7.06	3rd place, bronze medalist(s)
Petra Smarzova	Giant slalom, standing	1:30.52	+5.54	4	1:18.95	+5.09	4	2:49.47	+10.63	5

=== Snowboarding ===
Para-snowboarding is making its debut at the Winter Paralympics and it will be placed under the Alpine skiing program during the 2014 Games.

Men

Athlete	Event	Race 1		Race 2		Race 3		Total	
Athlete	Event	Time	Rank	Time	Rank	Time	Rank	Time	Rank
Marek Hlavina	Snowboard cross	1:05.42	17	1:04.36	16	1:03.57	18	2:07.93	19

== Biathlon ==
Men

Athlete	Events	Final				
Athlete	Events	Real Time	Calculated Time	Missed Shots	Result	Rank
Vladimir Gajdiciar	7.5km, sitting	24:17.8	24:17.8	0+0	+3:14.1	15
Vladimir Gajdiciar	12.5km, sitting	41:19.4	41:19.4	1+1+1+0	41:19.4	18
Vladimir Gajdiciar	15km, sitting	48:36.7	49:36.7	0+0+0+1	+7:15.9	16

== Cross-country skiing ==
Men

Athlete	Event	Qualification			Semifinal		Final		
Athlete	Event	Real Time	Result	Rank	Result	Rank	Real Time	Result	Rank
Vladimir Gajdiciar	1km sprint classic, sitting	2:33.42	+27.64	21	DNQ				
Vladimir Gajdiciar	10km free, sitting	—N/a					34:42.8	+3:50.8	18

== Wheelchair curling ==
Team

Position	Curler
Skip	Radoslav Ďuriš
Third	Branislav Jakubec
Second	Dusan Pitoňák
Lead	Monika Kunkelová

Standings

Final round robin standings
Team	Skip	Pld	W	L	PF	PA	Qualification
Russia	Andrei Smirnov	9	8	1	60	38	Playoffs
Canada	Jim Armstrong	9	7	2	66	42	Playoffs
China	Wang Haitao	9	5	4	54	45	Playoffs
Great Britain	Aileen Neilson	9	5	4	53	56	Playoffs
United States	Patrick McDonald	9	4	5	56	52	
Slovakia	Radoslav Ďuriš	9	4	5	47	68	
Sweden	Jalle Jungnell	9	4	5	59	49	
Norway	Rune Lorentsen	9	3	6	47	62	
South Korea	Kim Myung-jin	9	3	6	41	74	
Finland	Markku Karjalainen	9	2	7	61	58	

Results

Draw 1

Saturday, 8 March 9:30

Sheet D	1	2	3	4	5	6	7	8	Final
Slovakia (Ďuriš)	2	1	0	0	1	1	0	1	6
United States (McDonald) 🔨	0	0	1	1	0	0	2	0	4

Draw 3

Saturday, 9 March, 9:30

Sheet C	1	2	3	4	5	6	7	8	Final
China (Wang)	0	1	0	1	1	0	0	X	3
Slovakia (Ďuriš) 🔨	2	0	2	0	0	2	2	X	8

Draw 4

Sunday, 9 March, 15:30

Sheet B	1	2	3	4	5	6	7	8	Final
Finland (Karjalainen)	2	0	1	0	1	2	0	0	6
Slovakia (Ďuriš) 🔨	0	1	0	2	0	0	4	2	9

Draw 6

Monday, 10 March, 15:30

Sheet A	1	2	3	4	5	6	7	8	Final
Slovakia (Ďuriš) 🔨	2	0	0	0	0	0	0	X	2
Great Britain (Neilson)	0	2	1	2	1	4	2	X	12

Draw 7

Monday, 11 March, 9:30

Sheet D	1	2	3	4	5	6	7	8	Final
South Korea (Kim)	0	0	0	0	2	4	1	X	7
Slovakia (Ďuriš) 🔨	1	1	1	1	0	0	0	X	4

Draw 8

Tuesday, 11 March, 15:30

Sheet C	1	2	3	4	5	6	7	8	Final
Sweden (Jungnell)	2	2	0	0	1	0	4	X	9
Slovakia (Ďuriš) 🔨	0	0	1	1	0	1	0	X	3

Draw 9

Wednesday, 12 March, 9:30

Sheet A	1	2	3	4	5	6	7	8	Final
Norway (Lorentsen) 🔨	0	0	1	0	0	3	0	X	4
Slovakia (Ďuriš)	3	2	0	1	2	0	3	X	11

Draw 11

Thursday, 13 March, 9:30

Sheet C	1	2	3	4	5	6	7	8	Final
Slovakia (Ďuriš) 🔨	0	0	0	0	0	0	X	X	0
Canada (Armstrong)	3	4	2	3	2	2	X	X	16

Draw 12

Thursday, 13 March, 15:30

Sheet B	1	2	3	4	5	6	7	8	Final
Slovakia (Ďuriš) 🔨	1	0	1	0	1	1	0	0	4
Russia (Smirnov)	0	1	0	1	0	0	3	2	7

== See also ==
- Slovakia at the Paralympics
- Slovakia at the 2014 Winter Olympics
