= Austria at the 2014 Winter Paralympics =

- IPC code: AUT
- NPC: Austrian Paralympic Committee
- Website: www.oepc.at (in German)

in Sochi
- Competitors: 13 in 3 sports
- Medals Ranked 9th: Gold 2 Silver 5 Bronze 4 Total 11

Winter Paralympics appearances (overview)
- 1976; 1980; 1984; 1988; 1992; 1994; 1998; 2002; 2006; 2010; 2014; 2018; 2022; 2026

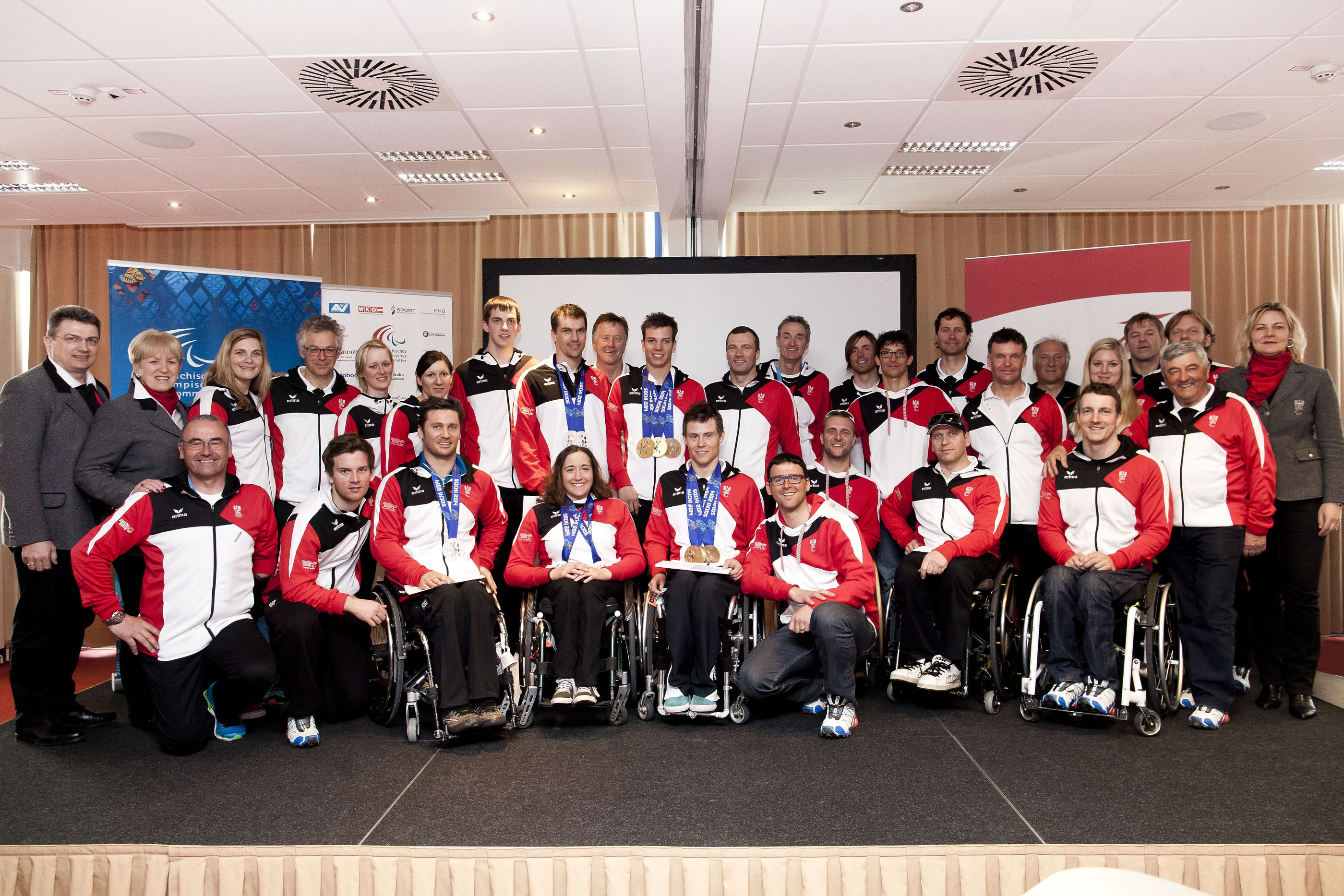
The Austrian Paralympic Team photographed on their return from Sochi

Austria competed at the 2014 Winter Paralympics in Sochi, Russia, held between 7–16 March 2014.

== Alpine skiing ==
Men

Athlete	Event	Run 1			Run 2			Final/Total		
Athlete	Event	Time	Diff	Rank	Time	Diff	Rank	Time	Diff	Rank
Philipp Bonadimann	Super-G, sitting	—N/a						1:26.84	+7.33	8
Philipp Bonadimann	Combined, sitting	DSQ								
Philipp Bonadimann	Slalom, sitting	54.59	+1.85	3	1:01.87	+2.44	5	1:56.48	+2.70	2nd place, silver medalist(s)
Dietmar Dorn	Super-G, sitting	—N/a						DNS		
Dietmar Dorn	Combined, sitting	DNF								
Dietmar Dorn	Slalom, sitting	56.62	+3.88	7	1:03.59	+4.16	9	2:00.21	+6.88	9
Dietmar Dorn	Giant slalom, sitting	1:25.33	+7.23	18	1:21.50	+7.40	15	2:46.83	+14.10	15
Martin Falch	Slalom, standing	54.22	+6.53	16	57.87	+6.59	13	1:52.09	+13.12	13
Martin Falch	Giant slalom, standing	1:22.95	+8.23	16	1:17.25	+6.10	11	2:40.20	+14.33	11
Thomas Grochar	Super-G, standing	—N/a						DNF		
Thomas Grochar	Combined, standing	55.46	+5.16	10	1:25.92	+7.53	14	2:21.38	+11.66	11
Thomas Grochar	Slalom, standing	51.09	+3.40	11	52.60	+1.32	4	1:43.69	+4.72	5
Thomas Grochar	Giant slalom, standing	DNF								
Andreas Kapfinger	Slalom, sitting	1:02.27	+9.53	18	1:10.11	+10.68	12	2:12.38	+18.60	12
Matthias Lanzinger	Downhill, standing	—N/a						1:25.57	+1.22	4
Matthias Lanzinger	Super-G, standing	—N/a						1:21.33	+0.41	2nd place, silver medalist(s)
Matthias Lanzinger	Combined, standing	52.43	+2.13	3	1:18.39	-	1	2:10.82	+1.10	2nd place, silver medalist(s)
Matthias Lanzinger	Slalom, standing	DNS								
Matthias Lanzinger	Giant slalom, standing	DNF								
Roman Rabl	Downhill, sitting	—N/a						1:25.35	+1.55	4
Roman Rabl	Super-G, sitting	—N/a						DNF		
Roman Rabl	Combined, sitting	58.71	-	1	1:21.49	+3.22	5	2:20.20	+2.00	3rd place, bronze medalist(s)
Roman Rabl	Slalom, sitting	55.79	+3.05	5	1:00.85	+1.42	2	1:56.64	+2.86	3rd place, bronze medalist(s)
Roman Rabl	Giant slalom, sitting	1:18.87	+0.77	3	1:14.44	+0.34	3	2:33.31	+0.58	3rd place, bronze medalist(s)
Markus Salcher	Downhill, standing	—N/a						1:24.35	-	1st place, gold medalist(s)
Markus Salcher	Super-G, standing	—N/a						1:20.92	-	1st place, gold medalist(s)
Markus Salcher	Giant slalom, standing	1:15.95	+1.23	2	1:12.19	+1.04	3	2:28.14	+2.27	3rd place, bronze medalist(s)
Reinhold Sampl	Downhill, sitting	—N/a						DNS		
Reinhold Sampl	Super-G, sitting	—N/a						DNS		
Martin Wuerz	Combined, standing	54.55	+4.25	8	1:23.39	+5.00	10	2:17.94	+8.22	7
Martin Wuerz	Slalom, standing	51.08	+3.39	10	55.32	+4.04	9	1:46.40	+7.43	9
Martin Wuerz	Giant slalom, standing	1:20.93	+6.21	9	1:15.78	+4.63	8	2:36.71	+10.84	7

Women

Athlete	Event	Run 1			Run 2			Final/Total		
Athlete	Event	Time	Diff	Rank	Time	Diff	Rank	Time	Diff	Rank
Claudia Lösch	Downhill, sitting	—N/a						DNF		
Claudia Lösch	Super-G, sitting	—N/a						1:31.20	+2.09	2nd place, silver medalist(s)
Claudia Lösch	Combined, sitting	1:05.12	+4.39	3	DNF					
Claudia Lösch	Slalom, sitting	1:13.83	+8.76	5	1:10.72	+5.86	5	2:24.55	+14.62	5
Claudia Lösch	Giant slalom, sitting	1:36.09	+5.65	5	1:19.82	+0.16	2	2:55.91	+4.65	2nd place, silver medalist(s)

=== Snowboarding ===
Para-snowboarding is making its debut at the Winter Paralympics and it will be placed under the Alpine skiing program during the 2014 Games.

Men

Athlete	Event	Race 1		Race 2		Race 3		Total	
Athlete	Event	Time	Rank	Time	Rank	Time	Rank	Time	Rank
Georg Schwab	Snowboard cross	1:34.94	29	1:54.47	32	1:35.63	30	3:10.57	33

== Biathlon ==
Men

Athlete	Events	Final			
Athlete	Events	Real Time	Missed Shots	Result	Rank
Michael Kurz	7.5km, standing	22:50.3	1+0	20:33.3	12
Michael Kurz	12.5km, standing	38:42.3	4+2+0+0	34:50.1	15
Michael Kurz	15km, standing	46:58.8	1+4+1+1	49:16.9	16

== Cross-country skiing ==
Men

Athlete	Event	Qualification			Semifinal		Final		
Athlete	Event	Real Time	Result	Rank	Result	Rank	Real Time	Result	Rank
Michael Kurz	1km sprint classic, standing	4:58.16	4:28.34	27	did not qualify				
Michael Kurz	10km free, standing	—N/a					28:37.7	25:45.9	13
Michael Kurz	20km, standing	—N/a					1:07:13.0	1:00:29.7	10

== See also ==
- Austria at the Paralympics
- Austria at the 2014 Winter Olympics
