= Alpine skiing at the 2014 Winter Paralympics – Men's super-G =

Men's super-G at the XI Paralympic Winter Games
- Paralympic alpine skiing
- Venue: Rosa Khutor Alpine Resort, Krasnaya Polyana, Russia
- Dates: 9 March 2014

Men's super-G (visually impaired) at the XI Paralympic Winter Games
- Competitors: 15 from 9 nations

Medalists
1st place, gold medalist(s)		Jakub Krako; Guide: Martin Motyka	Slovakia
2nd place, silver medalist(s)		Mark Bathum; Guide: Cade Yamamoto	United States
3rd place, bronze medalist(s)		Mac Marcoux; Guide: Robin Femy	Canada

Men's super-G (sitting) at the XI Paralympic Winter Games
- Competitors: 31 from 15 nations

Medalists
1st place, gold medalist(s)		Akira Kano	Japan
2nd place, silver medalist(s)		Taiki Morii	Japan
3rd place, bronze medalist(s)		Caleb Brousseau	Canada

Men's super-G (standing) at the XI Paralympic Winter Games
- Competitors: 31 from 13 nations

Medalists
1st place, gold medalist(s)		Markus Salcher	Austria
2nd place, silver medalist(s)		Matthias Lanzinger	Austria
3rd place, bronze medalist(s)		Alexey Bugaev	Russia

The men's super-G competition of the 2014 Winter Paralympics was held at Rosa Khutor Alpine Resort near Krasnaya Polyana, Russia. The competition took place on 9 March 2014.

== Medal table ==
* Host nation (Russia)

Rank	Nation	Gold	Silver	Bronze	Total
1	Austria (AUT)	1	1	0	2
1	Japan (JPN)	1	1	0	2
3	Slovakia (SVK)	1	0	0	1
4	United States (USA)	0	1	0	1
5	Canada (CAN)	0	0	2	2
6	Russia (RUS)*	0	0	1	1
Totals (6 entries)		3	3	3	9

== Visually impaired ==
In the visually impaired super-G, the athlete with a visual impairment has a sighted guide. The two skiers are considered a team, and dual medals are awarded.

Rank	Bib	Name	Country	Time	Difference
1st place, gold medalist(s)	3	Jakub Krako; Guide: Martin Motyka	Slovakia	1:20.58	
2nd place, silver medalist(s)	7	Mark Bathum; Guide: Cade Yamamoto	United States	1:20.71	+0.13
3rd place, bronze medalist(s)	8	Mac Marcoux; Guide: Robin Femy	Canada	1:20.77	+0.19
4	4	Yon Santacana Maiztegui; Guide: Miguel Galindo Garces	Spain	1:22.27	+1.69
5	9	Ivan Frantsev; Guide: German Agranovskii	Russia	1:26.00	+5.42
6	12	Valerii Redkozubov; Guide: Evgeny Geroev	Russia	1:26.66	+6.08
7	11	Maciej Krezel; Guide: Anna Ogarzynska	Poland	1:27.13	+6.55
8	1	Michal Beladic; Guide: Filip Motyka	Slovakia	1:29.30	+8.72
9	14	Radomir Dudas; Guide: Michal Cerven	Slovakia	1:31.51	+10.93
	10	Hugo Thomas; Guide: Luana Bergamin	Switzerland	DNS	
	2	Alessandro Daldoss; Guide: Luca Negrini	Italy	DNF	
	5	Marek Kubacka; Guide:Natalia Karpisova	Slovakia	DNF	
	6	Miroslav Haraus; Guide: Maros Hudik	Slovakia	DNF	
	13	Gabriel Juan Gorce Yepes; Guide: Josep Arnau Ferrer Ventura	Spain	DNF	
	15	Patrik Hetmer; Guide: Miroslav Macala	Czech Republic	DNF	

== Sitting ==
Rank	Bib	Name	Country	Time	Difference
1st place, gold medalist(s)	53	Akira Kano	Japan	1:19.51	
2nd place, silver medalist(s)	52	Taiki Morii	Japan	1:21.60	+2.09
3rd place, bronze medalist(s)	55	Caleb Brousseau	Canada	1:22.05	+2.54
4	51	Heath Calhoun	United States	1:24.65	+5.14
5	63	Frederic Francois	France	1:25.07	+5.56
6	58	Corey Peters	New Zealand	1:26.17	+6.66
7	56	Jasmin Bambur	United States	1:26.36	+6.85
8	67	Philipp Bonadimann	Austria	1:26.84	+7.33
9	71	Kurt Oatway	Canada	1:29.10	+9.59
10	75	Mick Brennan	Great Britain	1:30.48	+10.97
11	65	Arly Velasquez	Mexico	1:30.57	+11.06
12	47	Maurizio Nicoli	Switzerland	1:31.78	+12.27
13	77	Dino Sokolovic	Croatia	1:33.42	+13.91
	62	Franz Hanfstingl	Germany	DNS	
	73	Reinhold Sampl	Austria	DNS	
	74	Dietmar Dorn	Austria	DNS	
	48	Georg Kreiter	Germany	DNF	
	49	Kenji Natsume	Japan	DNF	
	50	Yohann Taberlet	France	DNF	
	54	Christoph Kunz	Switzerland	DNF	
	57	Thomas Nolte	Germany	DNF	
	59	Takeshi Suzuki	Japan	DNF	
	60	Josh Dueck	Canada	DNF	
	61	Roman Rabl	Austria	DNF	
	64	Kees-Jan van der Klooster	Netherlands	DNF	
	66	Christopher Devlin-Young	United States	DNF	
	68	Cyril More	France	DNF	
	69	Akira Taniguchi	Japan	DNF	
	70	Park Jong-Seork	South Korea	DNF	
	72	Oldrich Jelinek	Czech Republic	DNF	
	76	Thomas Jacobsen	Norway	DNF	

== Standing ==
Rank	Bib	Name	Country	Time	Difference
1st place, gold medalist(s)	23	Markus Salcher	Austria	1:20.92	
2nd place, silver medalist(s)	25	Matthias Lanzinger	Austria	1:21.33	+0.41
3rd place, bronze medalist(s)	29	Alexey Bugaev	Russia	1:22.30	+1.38
4	21	Vincent Gauthier-Manuel	France	1:22.59	+1.67
5	22	Michael Brügger	Switzerland	1:24.11	+3.19
6	37	James Stanton	United States	1:24.66	+3.74
7	20	Romain Riboud	France	1:25.03	+4.11
8	31	Martin France	Slovakia	1:25.50	+4.58
9	16	Gakuta Koike	Japan	1:25.54	+4.62
10	19	Cedric Amafroi-Broisat	France	1:25.58	+4.66
11	26	Alexander Vetrov	Russia	1:26.36	+5.44
12	42	Toshihiro Abe	Japan	1:27.82	+6.90
13	32	Kirk Schornstein	Canada	1:27.83	+6.91
14	40	Hansjörg Lantschner	Italy	1:28.68	+7.76
15	24	Thomas Pfyl	Switzerland	1:28.86	+7.94
16	46	Jochi Röthlisberger	Switzerland	1:33.07	+12.15
	35	Christian Lanthaler	Italy	DNS	
	41	Masahiko Tokai	Japan	DNS	
	45	Christophe Brodard	Switzerland	DNS	
	17	Matt Hallat	Canada	DNF	
	18	Toby Kane	Australia	DNF	
	27	Alexander Alyabyev	Russia	DNF	
	28	Mitchell Gourley	Australia	DNF	
	30	Adam Hall	New Zealand	DNF	
	33	Braydon Luscombe	Canada	DNF	
	34	Hiraku Misawa	Japan	DNF	
	36	Bart Verbruggen	Netherlands	DNF	
	38	Thomas Grochar	Austria	DNF	
	39	Ralph Green	United States	DNF	
	43	Jonathan Lujan	United States	DNF	
	44	Andrzej Szczesny	Poland	DNF	

== See also ==
- Alpine skiing at the 2014 Winter Olympics
