= 2014 Winter Paralympics medal table =

List of medals won by Paralympic delegations

2014 Winter Paralympics medals
- Location: Sochi, Russia

Highlights
- Most gold medals: Russia (29)
- Most total medals: Russia (77)
- Medalling NPCs: 19

The 2014 Winter Paralympics medal table is a list of National Paralympic Committees ranked by the number of medals won during the 2014 Winter Paralympics, which were held in Sochi, Russia from 7 to 16 March. Athletes from 45 nations participated in 72 events in five sports. The Russian team became the leader of the medal count, effectively collecting 37% of all medals. Russia's tally of 80 medals is the highest total ever recorded. The previous record was held by Austria with 70 medals in 1984. However, following the Games, the IPC discovered evidence that Russia's performance has been aided by a wider state-sponsored doping program.

== Medal table ==
The ranking in this table is based on information provided by the International Paralympic Committee (IPC) and is consistent with IPC convention in its published medal tables. By default, the table is ordered by the number of gold medals the athletes from a nation have won (in this context, a "nation" is an entity represented by a National Paralympic Committee). The number of silver medals is taken into consideration next and then the number of bronze medals. If nations are still tied, equal ranking is given and they are listed alphabetically by IPC country code.

In March 2025, Russian blind biathlete Nikolay Polukhin was found to have committed an anti-doping rule violation in relation to tampering and his results and 3 medals (1 gold and 2 silvers) were disqualified. This is the current medal table since his disqualification.

* Host nation (Russia)

Rank	NPC	Gold	Silver	Bronze	Total
1	Russia (RUS)*	29	27	21	77
2	Germany (GER)	9	5	1	15
3	Canada (CAN)	7	2	7	16
4	Ukraine (UKR)	6	9	13	28
5	France (FRA)	5	3	4	12
6	Slovakia (SVK)	3	2	2	7
7	Japan (JPN)	3	1	2	6
8	United States (USA)	2	7	9	18
9	Austria (AUT)	2	5	4	11
10	Great Britain (GBR)	1	3	2	6
11	Norway (NOR)	1	2	1	4
11	Sweden (SWE)	1	2	1	4
13	Spain (ESP)	1	1	1	3
14	Netherlands (NED)	1	0	0	1
14	Switzerland (SUI)	1	0	0	1
16	Belarus (BLR)	0	2	1	3
17	Finland (FIN)	0	1	0	1
17	New Zealand (NZL)	0	1	0	1
19	Australia (AUS)	0	0	2	2
Totals (19 entries)		72	73	71	216

== See also ==
- 2014 Winter Olympics medal table
