= France at the 2014 Winter Paralympics =

- IPC code: FRA
- NPC: French Paralympic and Sports Committee
- Website: france-paralympique.fr

in Sochi
- Competitors: 14 in 3 sports
- Flag bearers: Vincent Gauthier-Manuel (opening); Marie Bochet (closing)
- Medals Ranked 5th: Gold 5 Silver 3 Bronze 4 Total 12

Winter Paralympics appearances (overview)
- 1976; 1980; 1984; 1988; 1992; 1994; 1998; 2002; 2006; 2010; 2014; 2018; 2022; 2026

France competed at the 2014 Winter Paralympics in Sochi, Russia, held between 7–16 March 2014.

== Alpine skiing ==
Men

Athlete	Event	Run 1			Run 2			Final/Total		
Athlete	Event	Time	Diff	Rank	Time	Diff	Rank	Time	Diff	Rank
Cédric Amafroi-Broisat	Super-G, standing	—N/a						1:25.58	+4.66	10
Cédric Amafroi-Broisat	Combined, standing	54.64	+4.34	9	1:21.60	+3.21	7	2:16.24	+6.52	6
Cédric Amafroi-Broisat	Slalom, standing	DSQ								
Cédric Amafroi-Broisat	Giant slalom, standing	DNF								
Frédéric François	Downhill, sitting	—N/a						DNF		
Frédéric François	Super-G, sitting	—N/a						1:25.07	+5.56	5
Frédéric François	Combined, sitting	DNF								
Frédéric François	Slalom, sitting	58.62	+5.88	15	1:06.53	+7.10	11	2:05.15	+11.37	10
Frédéric François	Giant slalom, sitting	1:20.26	+2.16	6	1:14.71	+0.61	4	2:34.97	+2.24	5
Vincent Gauthier-Manuel	Downhill, standing	—N/a						1:25.30	+0.95	3rd place, bronze medalist(s)
Vincent Gauthier-Manuel	Super-G, standing	—N/a						1:22.59	+1.67	4
Vincent Gauthier-Manuel	Combined, standing	DNF								
Vincent Gauthier-Manuel	Slalom, standing	48.13	+0.44	2	52.11	+0.83	3	1:40.21	+1.27	2nd place, silver medalist(s)
Vincent Gauthier-Manuel	Giant slalom, standing	1:14.72	-	1	1:11.15	-	1	2:25.87	-	1st place, gold medalist(s)
Jean-Yves Le Meur	Slalom, sitting	DNF								
Jean-Yves Le Meur	Giant slalom, sitting	1:21.65	+3.55	9	1:15.82	+1.72	9	2:37.47	+4.74	9
Cyril Moré	Downhill, sitting	—N/a						DNF		
Cyril Moré	Super-G, sitting	—N/a						DNF		
Cyril Moré	Combined, sitting	DNF								
Cyril Moré	Slalom, sitting	56.93	+4.19	9	1:02.65	+3.22	8	1:59.58	+5.80	5
Cyril Moré	Giant slalom, sitting	1:23.38	+5.28	13	1:17.48	+3.38	11	2:40.86	+8.13	11
Romain Riboud	Downhill, standing	—N/a						1:29.20	+4.85	12
Romain Riboud	Super-G, standing	—N/a						1:25.03	+4.11	7
Romain Riboud	Combined, standing	54.38	+4.08	7	DNF					
Romain Riboud	Slalom, standing	52.94	+5.25	12	DNF					
Romain Riboud	Giant slalom, standing	1:21.04	+6.32	10	1:16.42	+5.27	10	2:37.46	+11.59	11
Yohann Taberlet	Downhill, sitting	—N/a						1:26.61	+2.81	7
Yohann Taberlet	Super-G, sitting	—N/a						DNF		
Yohann Taberlet	Combined, sitting	DNF								
Yohann Taberlet	Slalom, sitting	55.56	+2.82	4	1:02.24	+2.81	6	1:57.80	+4.02	5
Yohann Taberlet	Giant slalom, sitting	1:19.75	+1.65	5	1:15.15	+1.05	7	2:34.90	+2.17	4

Women

Athlete	Event	Run 1			Run 2			Final/Total		
Athlete	Event	Time	Diff	Rank	Time	Diff	Rank	Time	Diff	Rank
Marie Bochet	Downhill, standing	—N/a						1:30.72	-	1st place, gold medalist(s)
Marie Bochet	Super-G, standing	—N/a						1:24.20	-	1st place, gold medalist(s)
Marie Bochet	Combined, standing	53.48	-	1	1:24.91	-	1	2:18.39	-	1st place, gold medalist(s)
Marie Bochet	Slalom, standing	DNF								
Marie Bochet	Giant slalom, standing	1:24.98	-	1	1:13.86	-	1	2:38.84	-	1st place, gold medalist(s)
Solène Jambaqué	Downhill, standing	—N/a						1:34.88	+4.16	4
Solène Jambaqué	Super-G, standing	—N/a						1:26.20	+2.00	2nd place, silver medalist(s)
Solène Jambaqué	Combined, standing	DSQ								
Solène Jambaqué	Giant slalom, standing	1:27.71	+2.73	3	1:19.10	+5.24	5	2:46.81	+7.97	3rd place, bronze medalist(s)

=== Snowboarding ===
Para-snowboarding is making its debut at the Winter Paralympics and it will be placed under the Alpine skiing program during the 2014 Games.

Men

Athlete	Event	Race 1		Race 2		Race 3		Total	
Athlete	Event	Time	Rank	Time	Rank	Time	Rank	Time	Rank
Patrice Barattero	Snowboard cross	1:07.26	18	1:03.44	15	1:01.16	12	2:04.60	16

Women

Athlete	Event	Race 1		Race 2		Race 3		Total	
Athlete	Event	Time	Rank	Time	Rank	Time	Rank	Time	Rank
Cécile Hernandez-Cervellon	Snowboard cross	1:03.60	2	1:04.56	2	1:03.71	2	2:07.31	2nd place, silver medalist(s)

== Biathlon ==
Men

Athlete	Events	Final				
Athlete	Events	Real Time	Calculated Time	Missed Shots	Result	Rank
Thomas Clarion; Guide: Julien Bourla	7.5km, visually impaired	30:04.3	26:09.7	2+5	26:09.7	15
Benjamin Daviet	7.5km, standing	21:14.5	19:32.5	0+1	19:32.5	7
Benjamin Daviet	12.5km, standing	34:47.8	32:00.8	1+0+2+0	32:00.8	9
Romain Rosique	7.5km, sitting	26:01.9	24:28.2	0+0	24:28.2	16
Romain Rosique	15km, sitting	51:25.8	49:20.7	0+0+0+1	49:20.7	14

== Cross-country skiing ==
Men

Athlete	Event	Qualification			Semifinal		Final		
Athlete	Event	Real Time	Result	Rank	Result	Rank	Real Time	Result	Rank
Thomas Clarion; Guide: Julien Bourla	1km sprint classic, visually impaired	4:32.26	3:56.87	10	did not qualify				
Thomas Clarion; Guide: Julien Bourla	10km free, visually impaired	—N/a					27:52.3	24:14.9	3rd place, bronze medalist(s)
Benjamin Daviet	1km sprint classic, standing	4:04.08	3:44.55	6Q	4:10.3	4	did not advance		
Benjamin Daviet	10km free, standing	—N/a					27:19.4	25:08.2	8
Romain Rosique	1km sprint classic, sitting	2:43.26	2:33.46	22	did not qualify				
Romain Rosique	10km free, sitting	—N/a					36:01.4	33:51.7	13

Relay

Athletes	Event	Final	
Athletes	Event	Time	Rank
Thomas Clarion; Guide: Julien Bourla; Benjamin Daviet	4 x 2.5km open relay	25:30.3	3rd place, bronze medalist(s)

== See also ==
- France at the Paralympics
- France at the 2014 Winter Olympics
