= Ben Sneesby =

British alpine skier (born 1994)

Personal information
- Full name: Benjamin James Norman Leppard Sneesby
- Nationality: British
- Born: 26 June 1994 (age 31)

Sport
- Country: Great Britain
- Sport: Alpine skiing
- Event(s): Alpine Skiing; Slalom; Giant Slalom

Achievements and titles
- Paralympic finals: 2014 Sochi

Benjamin "Ben" Sneesby (born 26 June 1994) is a British alpine skier. Sneesby uses a sit-ski in competitions.

== Personal history ==
Sneesby was born on 26 June 1994 in High Wycombe. At the age of three months he was diagnosed with neuroblastoma, a childhood cancer. He underwent a course of chemotherapy and several operations, which resulted in the successful treatment of the tumour, but left him with no sensation in his left leg, and only partial feeling in his right leg.

Sneesby attended school at Claires Court School in Maidenhead and John Hampden Grammar School in High Wycombe, but on achieving his A-Levels, decided to defer his degree course to focus on his skiing. He is now studying LLB Law at the University of Leeds.

== Sports career ==
Sneesby began skiing at the age of 11 at adaptive sessions on a dry ski slope in High Wycombe. At the age of 13 he was spotted by the British Disabled Ski Team (BDST) and was offered a place as one of the first members of the BDST youth development squad. As well as showing promise as a skier, Sneesby also showed a talent for wheelchair basketball playing for the MK Aces and captaining the England South Wheelchair Basketball team at the 2013 National School Games.

Sneesby decided to focus fully on his skiing and in his first full competitive season in 2010 he recorded four top ten finishes across his events which qualified him to race at Europa Cup level in all five events, including his favoured Super G, Super Combination and Downhill. In early 2014 it was announced that he had qualified for the Great Britain team that would be competing at the 2014 Winter Paralympics in Sochi, Russia; competing in the sit-ski events. This was his debut Paralympics.

In January 2018 Sneesby was selected for the Great Britain Development Team for Wheelchair Tennis.
