= Germany at the 2014 Winter Paralympics =

- IPC code: GER
- NPC: National Paralympic Committee Germany
- Website: www.dbs-npc.de (in German)

in Sochi
- Competitors: 13 in 3 sports
- Flag bearers: Andrea Rothfuß (opening); Wilhelm Brem (closing)
- Medals Ranked 2nd: Gold 9 Silver 5 Bronze 1 Total 15

Winter Paralympics appearances (overview)
- 1976; 1980; 1984; 1988; 1992; 1994; 1998; 2002; 2006; 2010; 2014; 2018; 2022; 2026

Germany competed at the 2014 Winter Paralympics in Sochi, Russia, held between 7–16 March 2014.

During the games, Germany has a German House, that is located in the village of Estosadok, on the Mzymta River, 4 kilometers (2.5 mi) upstream from Krasnaya Polyana (Mountain Cluster).

== Alpine skiing ==
Germany has entered seven athletes in alpine skiing. In the combined, the first run is the slalom, the second is the super-G.

Men

Athlete	Class	Event	Run 1		Run 2		Total	
Athlete	Class	Event	Time	Rank	Time	Rank	Time	Rank
Franz Hanfstingl	LW12-1	Downhill, sitting	—N/a				DNF	
Franz Hanfstingl	LW12-1	Super-G, sitting	—N/a				DNS	
Franz Hanfstingl	LW12-1	Giant slalom, sitting	DNS					
Georg Kreiter	LW10-1	Downhill, sitting	—N/a				1:26.65	8
Georg Kreiter	LW10-1	Super-G, sitting	—N/a				DNF	
Georg Kreiter	LW10-1	Combined, sitting	DNF					
Georg Kreiter	LW10-1	Slalom, sitting	DNF					
Georg Kreiter	LW10-1	Giant slalom, sitting	1:19.16	4	DNF			
Thomas Nolte	LW11	Downhill, sitting	—N/a				1:29.31	11
Thomas Nolte	LW11	Super-G, sitting	—N/a				DSQ	
Thomas Nolte	LW11	Combined, sitting	59.25	2	1:22.93	6	2:22.18	5
Thomas Nolte	LW11	Slalom, sitting	56.07	6	DSQ			
Thomas Nolte	LW11	Giant slalom, sitting	1:21.86	10	1:15.25	8	2:37.11	8

Women

Athlete	Class	Event	Run 1		Run 2		Total	
Athlete	Class	Event	Time	Rank	Time	Rank	Time	Rank
Anna-Lena Forster	LW12-1	Downhill, sitting	—N/a				1:39.71	4
Anna-Lena Forster	LW12-1	Super-G, sitting	—N/a				DNF	
Anna-Lena Forster	LW12-1	Combined, sitting	1:01.04	2	1:37.92	2	2:38.96	2nd place, silver medalist(s)
Anna-Lena Forster	LW12-1	Slalom, sitting	1:06.41	1	1:07.94	2	2:14.35	2nd place, silver medalist(s)
Anna-Lena Forster	LW12-1	Giant slalom, sitting	1:35.77	4	1:23.56	3	2:59.33	3rd place, bronze medalist(s)
Andrea Rothfuß	LW6/8-2	Downhill, standing	—N/a				DNF	
Andrea Rothfuß	LW6/8-2	Super-G, standing	—N/a				DNF	
Andrea Rothfuß	LW6/8-2	Combined, standing	55.86	2	1:26.88	3	2:22.74	2nd place, silver medalist(s)
Andrea Rothfuß	LW6/8-2	Slalom, standing	59.37	1	1:00.48	1	1:59.85	1st place, gold medalist(s)
Andrea Rothfuß	LW6/8-2	Giant slalom, standing	1:25.36	2	1:14.34	2	2:39.70	2nd place, silver medalist(s)
Anna Schaffelhuber	LW10-2	Downhill, sitting	—N/a				1:35.55	1st place, gold medalist(s)
Anna Schaffelhuber	LW10-2	Super-G, sitting	—N/a				1:29.11	1st place, gold medalist(s)
Anna Schaffelhuber	LW10-2	Combined, sitting	1:00.73	1	1:32.57	1	2:33.30	1st place, gold medalist(s)
Anna Schaffelhuber	LW10-2	Slalom, sitting	1:05.07	1	1:04.86	1	2:09.93	1st place, gold medalist(s)
Anna Schaffelhuber	LW10-2	Giant slalom, sitting	1:05.07	1	1:04.86	1	2:09.93	1st place, gold medalist(s)

=== Snowboarding ===
Para-snowboarding is making its debut at the Winter Paralympics and it will be placed under the Alpine skiing program during the 2014 Games.

Men

Athlete	Event	Race 1		Race 2		Race 3		Total	
Athlete	Event	Time	Rank	Time	Rank	Time	Rank	Time	Rank
Stefan Losler	Snowboard cross	1:16.35	24	1:06.37	17	1:34.17	29	2:22.72	22

== Biathlon ==
Men

Athlete	Events	Final				
Athlete	Events	Real Time	Calculated Time	Missed Shots	Result	Rank
Wilhelm Brem; Guide: Florian Grimm	7.5km, visually impaired	25:31.4	22:12.3	0+1	22:12.3	7
Wilhelm Brem; Guide: Florian Grimm	12.5km, visually impaired	DNS				
Wilhelm Brem; Guide: Florian Grimm	15km, visually impaired	45:23.4	42:29.4	1+0+0+2	42:29.4	9
Martin Fleig	7.5km, sitting	24:03.3	23:20.0	0+1	23:20.0	9
Martin Fleig	12.5km, sitting	39:25.1	38:14.1	0+0+1+0	38:14.1	9
Martin Fleig	15km, sitting	46:43.6	46:19.5	0+1+0+0	46:19.5	8

Women

Athlete	Events	Final				
Athlete	Events	Real Time	Calculated Time	Missed Shots	Result	Rank
Andrea Eskau	6km, sitting	20:26.0	19:12.4	0+0	19:12.4	1st place, gold medalist(s)
Andrea Eskau	10km, sitting	DNF				
Andrea Eskau	12.5km, sitting	47:08.8	46:19.1	2+0+0+0	46:19.1	7
Vivian Hösch; Guide: Norman Schlee	6km, visually impaired	24:47.6	21:34.2	0+0	21:34.2	5
Vivian Hösch; Guide: Norman Schlee	12.5km, visually impaired	DNF				
Anja Wicker	6km, sitting	22:10.1	19:57.1	0+1	19:57.1	6
Anja Wicker	10km, sitting	36:33.8	32:54.4	0+0+0+0	32:54.4	1st place, gold medalist(s)
Anja Wicker	12.5km, sitting	46:03.4	41:27.1	0+0+0+0	41:27.1	2nd place, silver medalist(s)

== Cross-country skiing ==
Men

Athlete	Event	Qualification			Semifinal		Final		
Athlete	Event	Real Time	Result	Rank	Result	Rank	Real Time	Result	Rank
Martin Fleig	1km sprint classic, sitting	2:23.04	2:18.75	10 Q	2:38.9	6	did not advance		
Martin Fleig	10km free, sitting	—N/a					33:35.1	32:34.6	8
Tino Uhlig	1km sprint classic, standing	4:28.24	4:20.19	24	did not advance				
Tino Uhlig	10km free, standing	—N/a					27:53.8	27:03.6	21
Tino Uhlig	20km, standing	—N/a					1:01:00.2	55:30.7	5

Women

Athlete	Event	Qualification			Semifinal		Final		
Athlete	Event	Real Time	Result	Rank	Result	Rank	Real Time	Result	Rank
Andrea Eskau	1km sprint classic, sitting	2:44.35	2:34.49	2 Q	2:51.2	1 Q	RAL		6
Andrea Eskau	5km, sitting	—N/a					17:10.4	16:08.6	1st place, gold medalist(s)
Andrea Eskau	12km, sitting	—N/a					DNF		
Vivian Hösch; Guide: Norman Schlee	1km sprint classic, visually impaired	5:40.82	4:56.51	5 Q	5:54.9	3	did not advance		
Vivian Hösch; Guide: Norman Schlee	5km, visually impaired	—N/a					17:11.4	14:57.3	6
Anja Wicker	1km sprint classic, sitting	3:09.75	2:50.78	15	did not advance				
Anja Wicker	5km, sitting	—N/a					19:36.7	17:39.0	9
Anja Wicker	12km, sitting	—N/a					47:05.6	42:23.0	8

Relay

Athletes	Event	Final	
Athletes	Event	Time	Rank
Wilhelm Brem; Guide: Florian Grimm; Andrea Eskau; Tino Uhlig	4 x 2.5km mixed relay	28:22.8	5

== See also ==
- Germany at the Paralympics
- Germany at the 2014 Winter Olympics
