= Stephanie Jallen =

American para-alpine skier

Personal information
- Nickname: Hopper
- Born: February 13, 1996 (age 30) Kingston, Pennsylvania, U.S.
- Home town: Harding, Pennsylvania, U.S.
- Height: 5 ft 4 in (1.63 m)
- Weight: 119 lb (54 kg)

Sport
- Sport: Para alpine skiing
- Disability class: LW9-1
Medal record
Women's para alpine skiing
Representing United States
Paralympic Games
Bronze medal – third place	2014 Sochi	Super-G (standing)
Bronze medal – third place	2014 Sochi	Super combined (standing)
IPC Alpine Skiing World Championships
Bronze medal – third place	2015 Panorama	Giant slalom (standing)

Stephanie Jallen (born February 13, 1996), nicknamed Hopper, is an American skier. She qualified for the 2014 Winter Paralympics competing for Team USA and won a bronze in the standing super-G and super combined.

== Personal history ==
Stephanie Jallen was born on February 13, 1996 in Kingston, Pennsylvania. Jallen was born with CHILD syndrome, Congenital Hemidysplasia with Ichthyosis and Limb Defects Syndrome. This meant that Jallen's left leg had to be amputated, her left side is under-developed, and she suffers from rashes. Her nickname, Hopper, comes from the fact that when her prosthetic limbs weren't being worn, she had to hop. Jallen has always been active and learned to play soccer with her friends. She does have a crutch but she uses it mainly for balance and is happy to stand or move around on her leg. In an interview she said that she would not want to have her limbs back to normal as that would just make her "boring". Jallen is studying at King's College in hopes of earning a business degree.

== Career ==
Jallen was introduced to skiing at a 2006 winter ski clinic in Pennsylvania. Her international debut was in 2011. In that year, she was the US slalom champion after coming first in the event.

She has encouraged Iraq war amputees and when she was eleven in 2007 she spoke at Harrisburg to the Pennsylvania senate and told them not to give up.

In 2012, she "lacerated" her face in Kimberley, British Columbia in a Super-G event. The resulting wound needed twelve facial stitches. She also fractured her tibia plateau and partly tore a knee ligament. Jallen has also suffered head and back injuries, as well as undergone surgeries to the knee and ankle.

=== Paralympics ===
At her début Paralympics, the 2014 Winter Paralympics in Sochi, Jallen competed for Team USA in three events: the super-G, the slalom, and the super combined (Jallen is competing in standing in all events). She was the second-youngest member of the national team. She came third in the super-G, finishing 5.94 seconds behind Marie Bochet; also finishing behind Solène Jambaqué, both of France. Jallen came third in the super combined with a time of 1:25.15 seconds, 4.74 seconds behind Bochet, who won. However, Jallen did not finish the slalom and fell in the giant slalom.
