= Jade Etherington =

British alpine skier

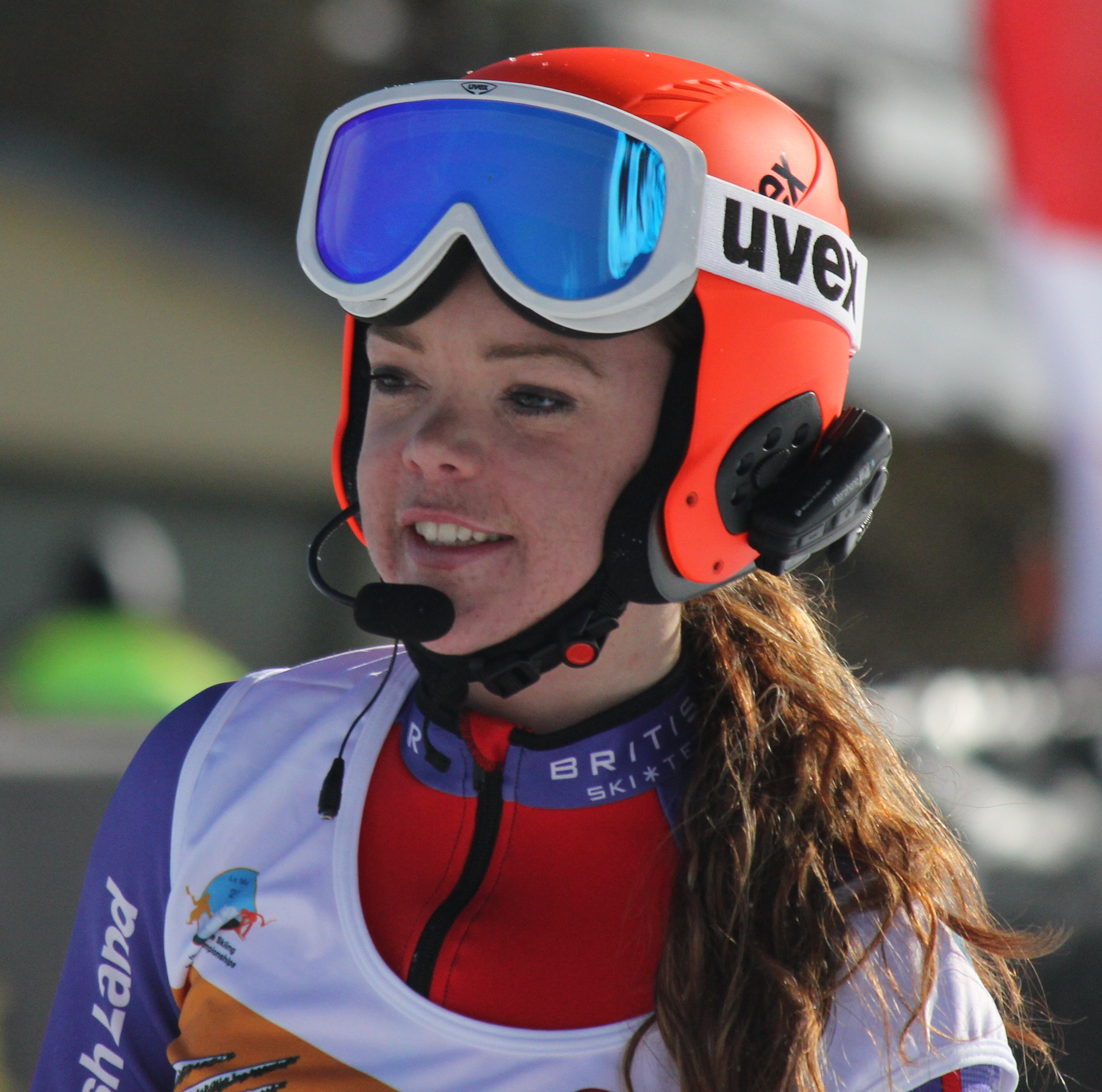
- Etherington at the 2013 IPC Alpine World Championships

Personal information
- Born: 9 March 1991 (age 35) Chelmsford, Essex, England
- Education: The Deepings School; Bishop Grosseteste University

Sport
- Country: Great Britain
- Sport: Alpine skiing
- Disability class: B2
- Events: Downhill slalom giant slalom Super-G

Achievements and titles
- Paralympic finals: 2014 Sochi
Medal record
Alpine skiing
Representing Great Britain
Paralympic Games
Silver medal – second place	2014 Sochi	Downhill, visually impaired
Silver medal – second place	2014 Sochi	Slalom, visually impaired
Silver medal – second place	2014 Sochi	Combined, visually impaired
Bronze medal – third place	2014 Sochi	Super-G, visually impaired
IPC World Championships
Bronze medal – third place	2013 La Molina	Women's Super G

Jade Etherington (born 9 March 1991) is a British former alpine skier who, with her sighted guide Caroline Powell, won silver in the women's downhill skiing, combined and slalom, and bronze medals in the Super-G at the 2014 Winter Paralympic Games in Sochi. Their three silvers and a bronze at the Winter Paralympics made them the most successful female British Winter Paralympians of all time, and the first Britons to win four medals at one Paralympics. Because of her success at the 2014 Paralympics, Etherington was the British flagbearer at the 2014 Winter Paralympics closing ceremony.

Etherington has only five percent vision in both eyes and competes in the visually impaired category. Because of her impairment she requires a sighted guide, Caroline Powell. The pair have competed together since August 2013. After asking for a new guide through Facebook and after two other applicants pulled out, Etherington and Powell combined in April 2013.

== Personal history ==
Etherington was born in Chelmsford on 9 March 1991, to Amber, a Braintree District Council employee, and Andrew, a stockbroker. They lived in The Causeway, Maldon, but when Jade was seven they moved to Lincolnshire. She was born with glaucoma and Axenfeld syndrome, a visual impairment which can lead to blindness. She inherited it from her mother, Amber, who lost her sight at 14. Her three younger sisters also have the condition. Despite undergoing multiple surgeries as a child, by the age of 17 she began to lose her sight. She describes her vision as "very blurry with little focus", and she has a recorded five percent vision in both eyes, which puts her in the B2 classification.

Etherington was educated at The Deepings School in Lincolnshire before matriculating to Bishop Grosseteste University where she was awarded a degree in education and geography. Etherington studied to become a geography teacher with The Open University, undertaking a PGCE, but placed her career on hold to concentrate on the 2014 Winter Paralympic Games. In 2014, she was awarded doctorate of science honoris causa by Anglia Ruskin University.

== Skiing career ==
Etherington began skiing while still sighted at the age of eight, being taught by her father Andrew and her sisters. She continued skiing recreationally for the next ten years. In 2009, she joined the British Disabled Ski Team (BDST) at development level, and began racing internationally in 2011. The following year she carried the Olympic torch through Lincoln, and was inspired to compete at a higher level after watching the 2012 Summer Olympics and Paralympics in London.

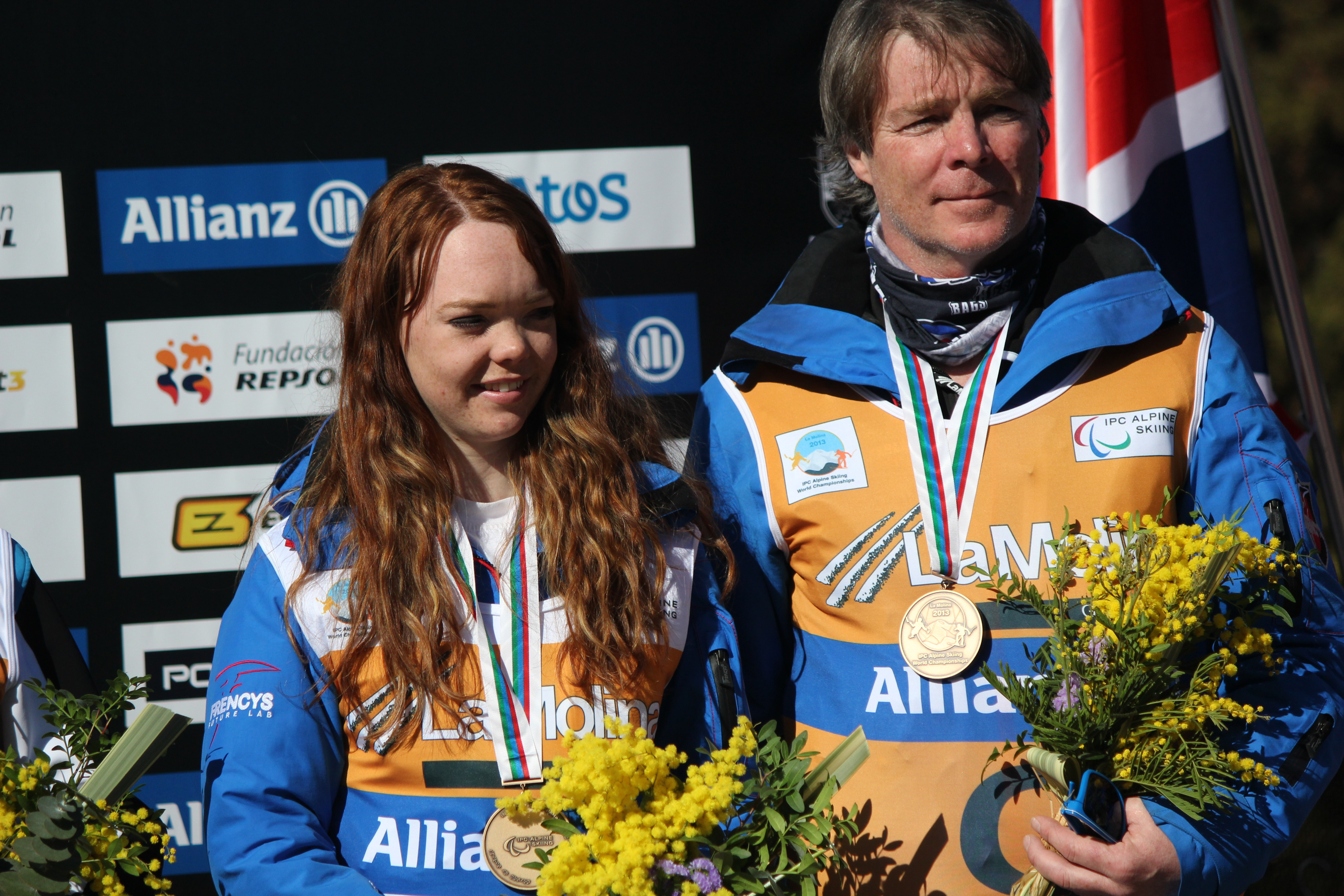
Jade Etherington and guide John Clarke receive bronze medals for the super-G at the 2013 IPC Alpine World Championships in La Molina

Etherington's success at Europa cup and International Paralympic Committee (IPC) alpine skiing events was achieved with her sighted guide Fiona Gingell, but Etherington was forced to appeal for a new guide on her Facebook page after Gingell married and moved to America. After two applicants pulled out, she was left without a guide at the beginning of 2013, but Heather Mills, who had not qualified for the World Championships, offered her coach, John Clark.

The pair qualified for the 2013 IPC Alpine Skiing World Championships in La Molina, representing Great Britain. At La Molina, Etherington came fourth in the women's slalom and came third in the women's super-G, taking bronze. The runs ensured her place at the 2014 Winter Paralympics in Sochi. Etherington teamed up with Caroline Powell in April, allowing her to compete that season. Etherington and Powell began skiing together in August 2013.

=== Paralympics ===
The 2014 Winter Paralympics was Etherington's debut Paralympics, competing for ParalympicsGB. She competed in the downhill, winning a silver medal with Powell on 8 March 2014. Slovakian Henrieta Farkasova came 2.73 seconds ahead. This was the first time a British woman had won a Winter Paralympic medal on snow, and ParalympicsGB's first medal of the 2014 Paralympics. Etherington then won a bronze medal in the women's downhill skiing, and silver in the slalom and the super combined. After winning a silver medal in the super-G visually impaired event on 14 March 2014, she and Powell became Great Britain's most successful female Winter Paralympians, and the first Britons to win four medals at one Paralympics. However, they pulled out of the giant slalom, which was on the day of the Sochi 2014 Closing Ceremony. The four medals she won at the 2014 Winter Paralympics were part of a total of six for ParalympicsGB, 66% of the total British medals at the games.

Etherington was the flag bearer for Great Britain at the closing ceremony, despite rupturing an ovarian cyst, which left her in a wheelchair for much of the day of the ceremony; she was able to walk and carry the flag having taken painkillers. After the end of the 2014 Winter Paralympics, she was unsure if she would continue competing at international level, saying "I don't really know what I want right now". In November 2014, Etherington announced her retirement from the Paralympic alpine skiing programme, aged 23.
