= Caleb Brousseau =

Canadian para-alpine skier (born 1988)

Personal information
- Nationality: Canadian
- Born: July 30, 1988 (age 37) Terrace, British Columbia
- Height: 1.72 m (5 ft 8 in)
- Weight: 63 kg (139 lb)

Sport
- Country: Canada
- Sport: Alpine skiing (sitting)
Medal record
Men's Para-alpine skiing
Representing Canada
Paralympic Games
Bronze medal – third place	2014 Sochi	Super-G, sitting

Caleb Brousseau (born July 30, 1988) is a Canadian para-alpine skier.

He was born in Terrace, British Columbia and has 11 brothers and sisters. In 2007 he was injured in a snowboarding accident and transitioned to sit skiing.

He won a bronze medal at the 2014 Winter Paralympics in Sochi, Russia, in the men's sitting super-G.
