= Anna-Lena Forster =

German Para alpine skier

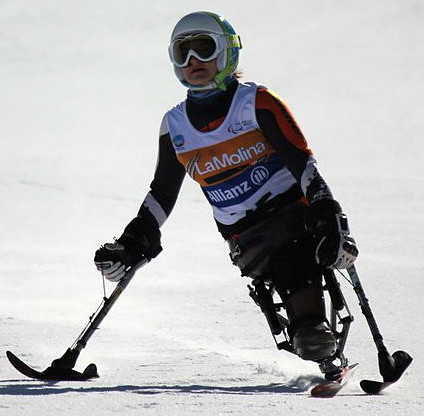
- Forster at the 2013 IPC World Championships

Personal information
- Nicknames: "Leni", "Lenchen"
- Born: 15 June 1995 (age 31) Radolfzell, Germany
- Years active: 2012–

Sport
- Country: Germany
- Sport: Para alpine skiing
- Disability class: LW12-1
- Events: Downhill; Giant slalom slalom Super-G; Super combined
- Coached by: Justus Wolf
Medal record
Women's Para alpine skiing
Representing Germany
Paralympic Games
Gold medal – first place	2018 Pyeongchang	Slalom sitting
Gold medal – first place	2018 Pyeongchang	Super combined sitting
Gold medal – first place	2022 Beijing	Super combined sitting
Gold medal – first place	2022 Beijing	Slalom sitting
Gold medal – first place	2026 Milano Cortina	Downhill sitting
Gold medal – first place	2026 Milano Cortina	Giant slalom sitting
Silver medal – second place	2014 Sochi	Super-combined sitting
Silver medal – second place	2014 Sochi	Slalom sitting
Silver medal – second place	2022 Beijing	Downhill sitting
Silver medal – second place	2026 Milano Cortina	Super combined sitting
Bronze medal – third place	2014 Sochi	Giant slalom sitting
World Championships
Gold medal – first place	2019 Sella Nevea	Slalom sitting
Gold medal – first place	2021 Lillehammer	Downhill sitting
Gold medal – first place	2021 Lillehammer	Super-G sitting
Gold medal – first place	2021 Lillehammer	Slalom sitting
Gold medal – first place	2021 Lillehammer	Super combined sitting
Gold medal – first place	2023 Lleida	Super-G sitting
Gold medal – first place	2023 Lleida	Alpine combined sitting
Gold medal – first place	2023 Lleida	Giant slalom sitting
Gold medal – first place	2023 Lleida	Slalom sitting
Gold medal – first place	2025 Maribor	Slalom sitting
Silver medal – second place	2013 La Molina	Slalom sitting
Silver medal – second place	2017 Tarvisio	Slalom sitting
Silver medal – second place	2019 Sella Nevea	Downhill sitting
Silver medal – second place	2019 Sella Nevea	Giant slalom sitting
Silver medal – second place	2019 Sella Nevea	Super combined sitting
Silver medal – second place	2023 Lleida	Downhill sitting
Silver medal – second place	2025 Maribor	Giant slalom sitting
Bronze medal – third place	2015 Panorama	Slalom sitting
Bronze medal – third place	2017 Tarvisio	Super combined sitting

Anna-Lena Forster (born 15 June 1995) is a German Para alpine skier who competed at the 2014, 2018, 2022 and 2026 Winter Paralympics winning five gold medals.

== Early life ==
Forster was born in Radolfzell, Konstanz Germany. She was born without a right leg and with bones missing in her left leg. She started skiing at the age of six at the VDK Munchen ski club.

== Career ==
Forster competes in the LW12 para-alpine skiing classification using a mono-ski and outriggers.

At the 2013 IPC Alpine Skiing World Championships, she won a silver medal in the women's slalom in a time of 2 minutes 31.31 seconds. She was also placed fourth in the super-combined and fifth in the super-G but she failed to finish the giant slalom.

Forster was selected as part of the German team for the 2014 Winter Paralympics in Sochi, Russia. Competing in the slalom she finished in a time of 2 minutes 14.35 seconds and was identified as the gold medal winner and press releases announcing her victory were posted. She was given gold because her compatriot Anna Schaffelhuber, who finished in a faster time, was disqualified for not having her outriggers in a stationary position at the start of her first run. Following an appeal Schaffelhuber was reinstated and Forster was awarded the silver medal. Forster won her second silver medal of the Games, again finishing behind Schaffelhuber, in the combined. The two German skiers were the only athletes to complete the race. Her third Paralympic medal, a bronze, came in the giant slalom where she finished behind Schaffelhuber and Austrian skier Claudia Lösch in a time of 2 minutes 59.33 seconds. In the downhill Forster came fourth and therefore missed out on a medal. She failed to finish the super-G event.

Forster was nominated for the Baden Sports Personality of the Year award in 2012 and in 2013 she was awarded a gold medal by her home town of Radolfzell to mark her achievements.

She won the silver medal in the women's downhill sitting event at the 2022 Winter Paralympics.
