= Caroline Powell (skier) =

British paralympics sighted guide

Personal information
- Born: 29 June 1994 (age 32) Basildon, Essex

Sport
- Sport: Skiing
Medal record
Alpine skiing
Representing Great Britain
Paralympic Games
Silver medal – second place	2014 Sochi	Downhill, visually impaired (guide)
Silver medal – second place	2014 Sochi	Slalom, visually impaired (guide)
Silver medal – second place	2014 Sochi	Combined, visually impaired (guide)
Bronze medal – third place	2014 Sochi	Super-G, visually impaired (guide)

Caroline Powell (born 29 June 1994) is a British skier, ski instructor, sighted guide and Paralympian.

== Life ==
Powell was born in 1994 and was skiing by the age of two. She first appeared for the British ski team at Champery, Les Crosets in January 2010. She is a qualified ski instructor and coach.

At the 2014 Winter Paralympic Games, as guide for visually impaired skier Jade Etherington, she won silver medals in the women's downhill, women's slalom and women's combined skiing events, as well as winning a bronze medal in the women's super-G.

After winning a silver medal in the Super-G, visually impaired event on 14 March 2014, she and Jade Etherington became Great Britain's most successful female Winter Paralympians, and the first Britons to win four medals at one Paralympics.
