= Marie Bochet =

French para-alpine skier (born 1994)

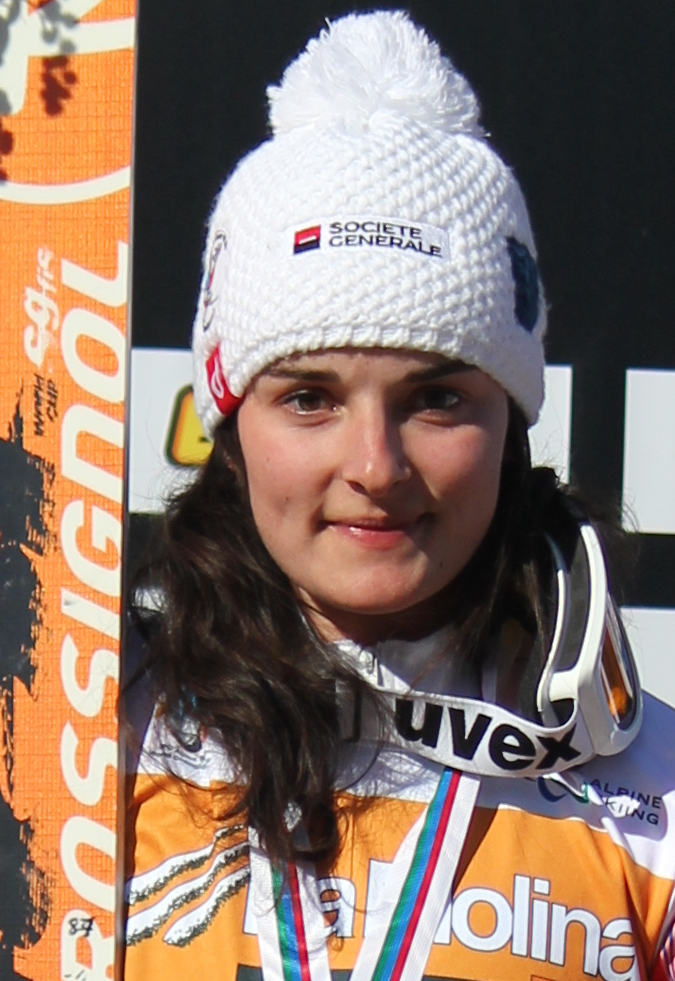
- Bochet in 2013

Personal information
- Nationality: French
- Born: Marie Isabelle Élise Bochet; 9 February 1994 (age 32) Chambéry, France

Sport
- Country: France
- Sport: Alpine skiing
- Event(s): Downhill; Slalom; Giant slalom Super combined Super-G
Medal record
Event	1st	2nd	3rd
Paralympic Games	8	1	0
World Championships	22	5	1
Total	30	6	1
Women's para alpine skiing
Representing France
Winter Paralympic Games
Gold medal – first place	2014 Sochi	Downhill, standing
Gold medal – first place	2014 Sochi	Super-G, standing
Gold medal – first place	2014 Sochi	Combined, standing
Gold medal – first place	2014 Sochi	Giant, standing
Gold medal – first place	2018 Pyeongchang	Downhill, standing
Gold medal – first place	2018 Pyeongchang	Super-G, standing
Gold medal – first place	2018 Pyeongchang	Giant slalom, standing
Gold medal – first place	2018 Pyeongchang	Slalom, standing
Silver medal – second place	2022 Beijing	Super-G, standing
IPC Alpine Skiing World Championships
Gold medal – first place	2013 La Molina	Downhill, standing
Gold medal – first place	2013 La Molina	Giant slalom, standing
Gold medal – first place	2013 La Molina	Slalom, standing
Gold medal – first place	2013 La Molina	Super-G, standing
Gold medal – first place	2013 La Molina	Super combined, standing
Gold medal – first place	2015 Panorama	Downhill, standing
Gold medal – first place	2015 Panorama	Giant slalom, standing
Gold medal – first place	2015 Panorama	Slalom, standing
Gold medal – first place	2015 Panorama	Super-G, standing
Gold medal – first place	2015 Panorama	Super combined, standing
Gold medal – first place	2017 Tarvisio	Downhill, standing
Gold medal – first place	2017 Tarvisio	Super-G, standing
Gold medal – first place	2017 Tarvisio	Super combined, standing
Silver medal – second place	2017 Tarvisio	Giant slalom, standing
Silver medal – second place	2017 Tarvisio	Slalom, standing

Marie Isabelle Élise Bochet (French pronunciation: [maʁi bɔʃɛ]; born 2 February 1994) is a French alpine skier and Paralympic champion. She has won a total of 8 gold medals across four Winter Paralympic Games, and a further 22 gold medals across six World Championships.

== Career ==
Bochet was born in Chambéry in the French Alps in 1994 to Yvon and Françoise, both cheesemakers. She was five when she started skiing. She has a disability, as her left forearm suffers from agenesis.

She competed at the 2010 Winter Paralympics in Vancouver but did not make the podium. She skied at the 2011 IPC Alpine Skiing World Championships and was the second skier to finish in the standing women's downhill race and the Super-G.

Bochet competed in the 2014 Winter Paralympics in Sochi, where she won four gold medals.

At the 2018 Winter Paralympics in Pyeongchang, Bochet won four further gold medals. At the Pyeongchang Games, she was elected a member of the International Paralympic Committee and joined the athlete's commission. She is also a member of the athlete's commission for the 2024 Olympic and Paralympic Games.

== Honours ==
- Officer of the Legion of Honour (2018)

Awards
Preceded by (Brazil) Daniel Dias	Laureus World Sportsperson with a Disability of the Year; 2014	Succeeded by (United States) Tatyana McFadden
