= Laurie Stephens =

American para-alpine skier (born 1984)

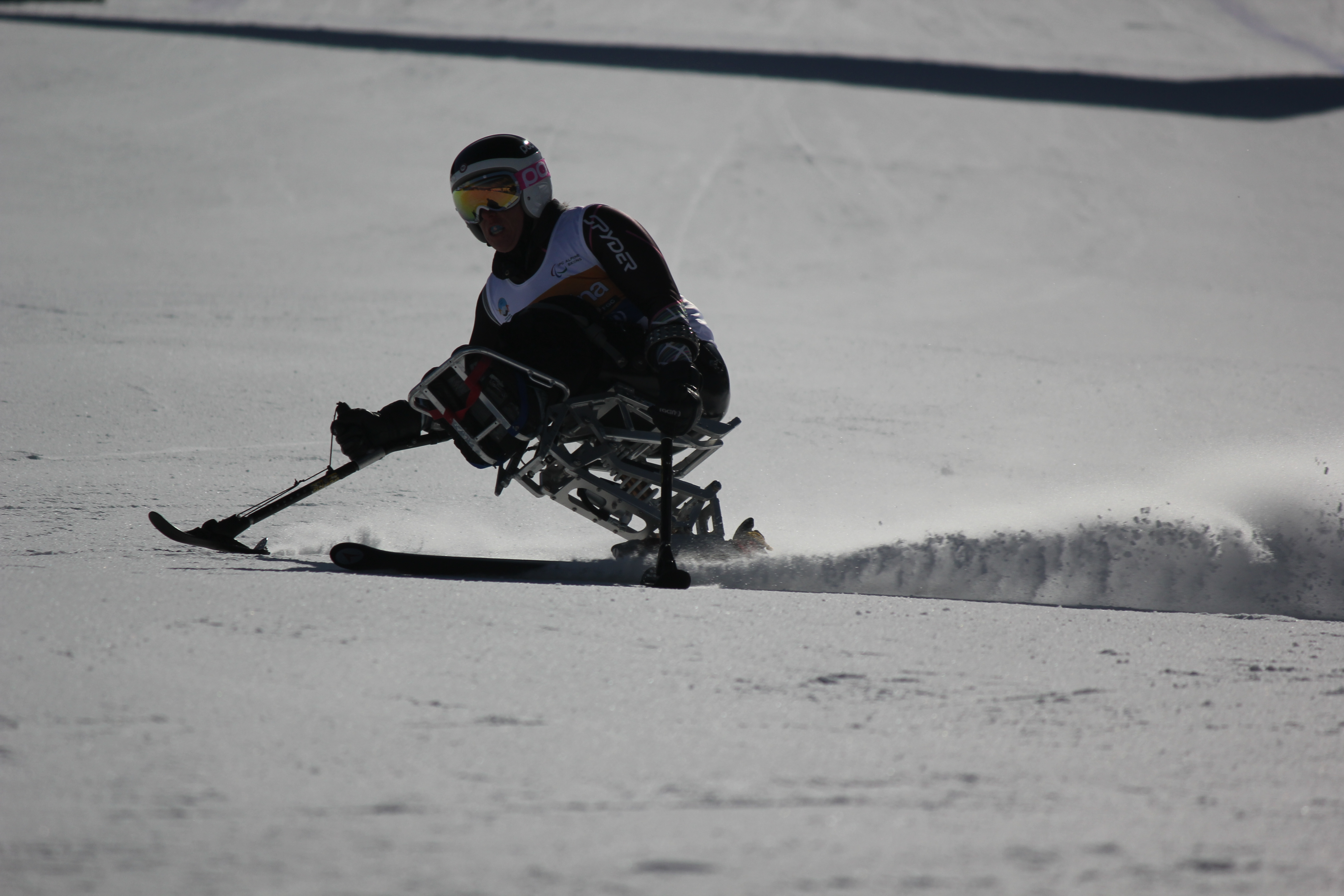
- Stephens at the 2013 World Championships

Personal information
- Born: March 5, 1984 (age 42) Wenham, Massachusetts, U.S.
- Height: 5 ft 0 in (152 cm)
- Weight: 119 lb (54 kg)

Sport
- Country: United States
- Sport: Para-alpine skiing
- Disability class: LW12-1
- Event(s): Downhill, slalom, giant slalom, super combined, super-G
Medal record
Women's para-alpine skiing
Representing United States
Winter Paralympics
Gold medal – first place	2006 Turin	Downhill, sitting
Gold medal – first place	2006 Turin	Super-G, sitting
Silver medal – second place	2006 Turin	Giant slalom, sitting
Silver medal – second place	2010 Vancouver	Downhill, sitting
Bronze medal – third place	2014 Sochi	Downhill, sitting
Bronze medal – third place	2014 Sochi	Super-G, sitting
Bronze medal – third place	2018 Pyeongchang	Downhill, sitting
World Championships
Gold medal – first place	2013 La Molina	Downhill, sitting
Gold medal – first place	2021 Lillehammer	Giant slalom, sitting
Silver medal – second place	2011 Sestriere	Downhill, sitting
Silver medal – second place	2011 Sestriere	Super-G, sitting
Silver medal – second place	2023 Lleida	Super-G, sitting
Silver medal – second place	2023 Lleida	Alpine combined, sitting
Silver medal – second place	2023 Lleida	Giant slalom, sitting
Bronze medal – third place	2011 Sestriere	Super combined, sitting
Bronze medal – third place	2013 La Molina	Super-G, sitting
Bronze medal – third place	2015 Panorama	Super combined, sitting
Bronze medal – third place	2019 Sella Nevea	Super-G, sitting
Bronze medal – third place	2021 Lillehammer	Slalom, sitting

Laurie Stephens (born March 5, 1984) is an alpine monoskier who has spina bifida. She has won multiple medals for the United States at the Paralympics. She has also had success at the IPC Alpine Skiing World Cup.

== Career ==
Laurie Stephens started skiing at age 12 on Loon Mountain in New Hampshire and then began racing 3 years later at age 15 when she became a member of Chris Devlin-Young's New England Disabled Ski Team. Stephens competes in 5 different skiing events which are the downhill, slalom, giant slalom, super-G, and Super Combined. She has competed in 4 Paralympic games and 5 world championships. Her debut as a Paralympian was in 2006 and since she has competed in the 2010, 2014, and the 2018 games. She has won a total of 7 Paralympic medals (2 gold, 2 silver, and 3 bronze) and 7 world championship medals (1 gold, 3 silver, 3 bronze). Stephens was named the Paralympic Sportswoman of the Year in 2006 by the United States Olympic Committee. Some of her best racing performances where in 2006 when she won her two gold medals in the super-G-Sitting (time 1:33.88) and downhill-Sitting (time 1:46.86). In 2006 Stephens was also nominated for an Excellence in Sports Performance Yearly Award as Best Female Athlete with a Disability. In the 2018 PyeongChang games Laurie Stephens won a bronze medal for the US in alpine skiing using a mono-ski, her time was 1:35.8. In 2018 she also placed 4th in the Super combined-Sitting, 5th in the super-G-Sitting and Slalom-Sitting, 7th in giant slalom-Sitting. Stephens also has competed for the United States in Paralympic swimming she held two records on in the 100-meter backstroke and one in the 200-meter backstroke.

She won the gold medal in the women's giant slalom sitting para-alpine skiing event at the 2021 World Para Snow Sports Championships.

== Education ==
Outside of sports she studied therapeutic recreation at the University of New Hampshire.
