= Claudia Lösch =

Austrian para-alpine skier

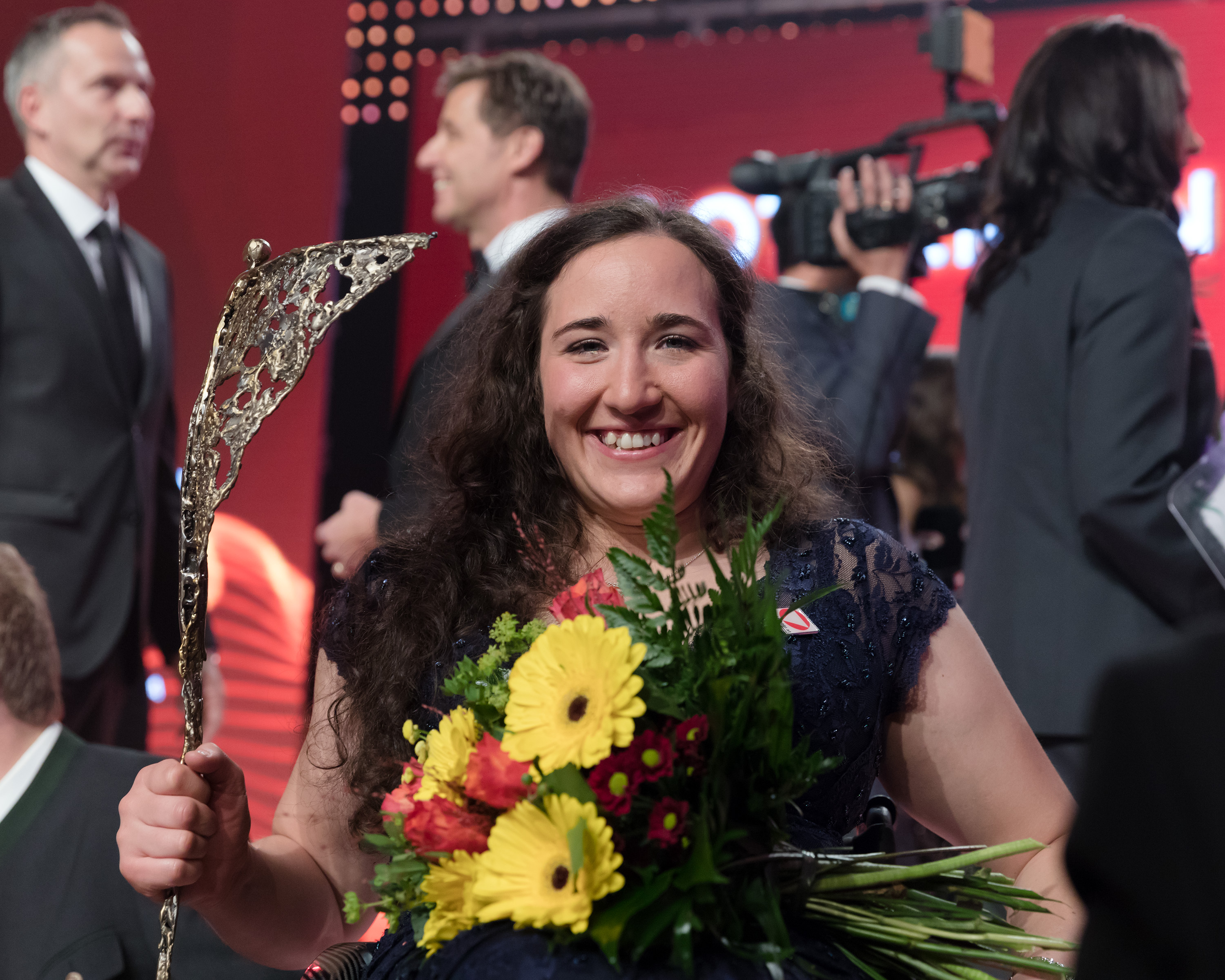

Personal information
- Nationality: Austrian
- Born: 19 October 1988 (age 37)
- Website: claudia-loesch.at
Medal record
Women's alpine skiing
Representing Austria
Paralympic Games
Gold medal – first place	2010 Vancouver	Slalom sitting Sitting
Gold medal – first place	2010 Vancouver	Super-G sitting Sitting
Silver medal – second place	2010 Vancouver	Super Combined sitting Sitting
Silver medal – second place	2014 Sochi	Super-G sitting Sitting
Silver medal – second place	2014 Sochi	Giant slalom sitting Sitting
Bronze medal – third place	2006 Turin	Downhill sitting Sitting
Bronze medal – third place	2010 Vancouver	Women's downhill Sitting
IPC Alpine Skiing World Championships
Gold medal – first place	2013 La Molina	Super-G; Sitting
Gold medal – first place	2013 La Molina	Super combined Sitting
Gold medal – first place	2013 La Molina	Giant slalom Sitting
Gold medal – first place	2015 Panorama	Downhill; Sitting
Gold medal – first place	2015 Panorama	Slalom; Sitting
Gold medal – first place	2015 Panorama	Super combined Sitting
Silver medal – second place	2015 Panorama	Giant slalom Sitting

Claudia Lösch (born 19 October 1988) is a successful Austrian Paralympian and alpine monoskier. She won gold medals in the slalom and super slalom at the 2010 Winter Paralympics in Vancouver. She also won a silver medal at the Alpine skiing at the 2014 Winter Paralympics – Women's super-G.

== Life ==
Lösch was born in 1988 in Vienna and at early age she was left paraplegic in 1994. Losch was brought up in Neupölla and graduated from her school in Horn in 2007 before studying political science in Innsbruck.

Losch took up alpine sports where she has been successful in the "women sitting" events. She has won five medals at Paralympics including two gold medals. She has also completed successfully at the world championships. Losch competed in the World Cup in Canada.

== Honours ==
In 2014, she was awarded the 2014 Disabled Athletes of the Year award in Vienna, Austria.

== Results ==
- European Cup overall victories in 2003/04, 2004/05 and 2005/06.
- Overall World Cup victories in 2008/09 and 2009/10
- Alpine Ski Championships in disabled sports in 2009 South Korea: silver in giant slalom and super combined,
- Alpine Ski Championships in disabled sports in 2011 Sestriere, (Italy): Bronze in Downhill and Super-G, Silver in the super combined, Silver in slalom and giant slalom
- 2006 Winter Paralympics Turin (Italy): bronze in the downhill,
- 2010 Winter Paralympics Vancouver (Canada): gold in super-G and slalom, silver in the Super Combine.
- 2014 Winter Paralympics Sochi (Russia): silver in super-G and giant slalom
