= Charlotte Evans =

English skier (born 1991)

Charlotte Evans MBE
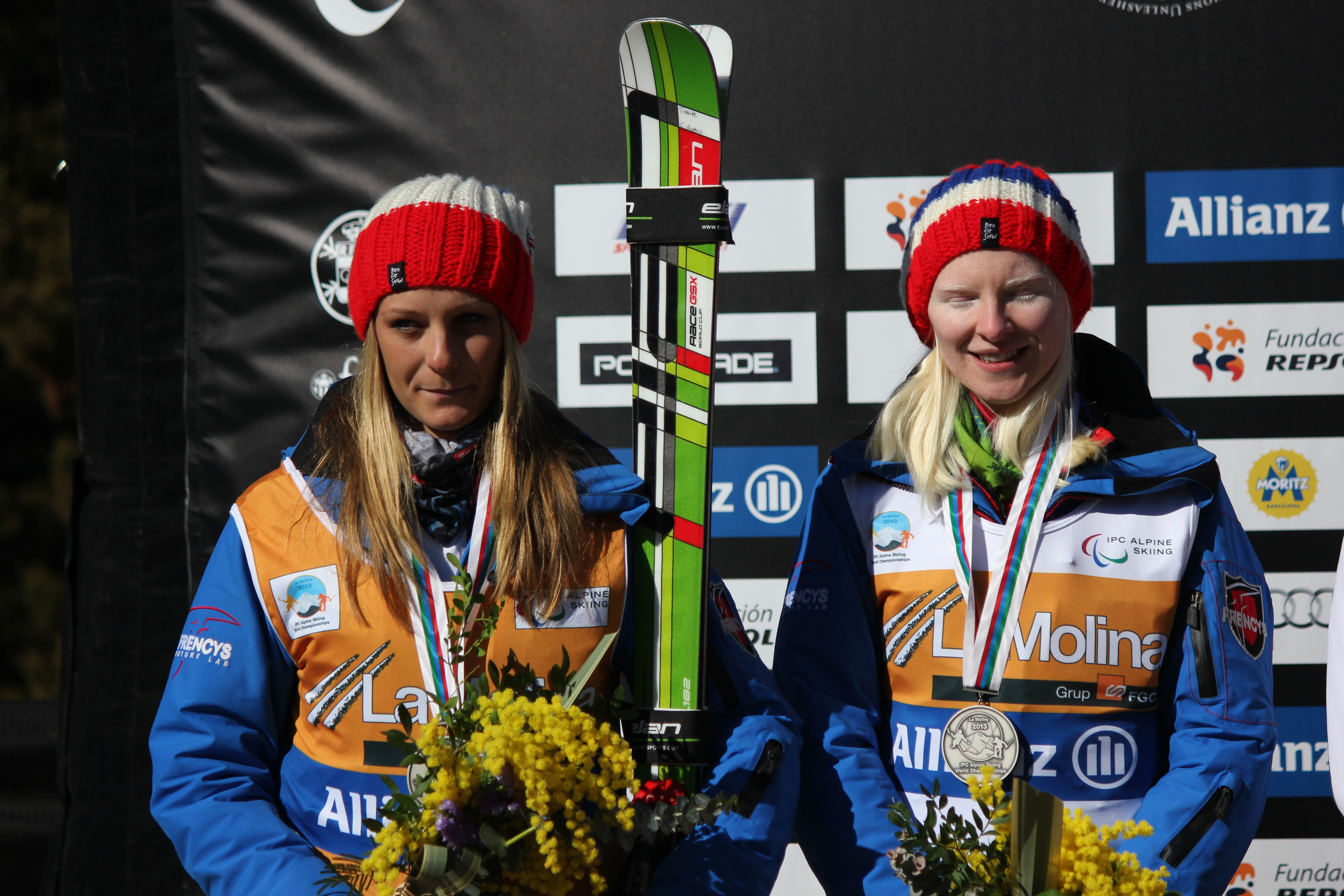
- Evans (left) with skier Kelly Gallagher

Personal information
- Nickname: Charl
- Born: 29 March 1991 (age 35)

Sport
- Sport: Skiing
Medal record
Alpine skiing
Representing Great Britain
Paralympic Games
Gold medal – first place	2014 Sochi	Super-G (guide)

Charlotte Evans MBE (born 29 March 1991) is a British skier, sighted guide and Paralympian. She is from Chatham in Kent, and attended Rochester Grammar School and then MidKent College. She started skiing as a child at the Chatham Ski Centre, a dry ski slope, moving on to snow at the age of 14.

At the 2014 Winter Paralympic Games, as guide for visually impaired skier Kelly Gallagher, she won gold in the women's super-G. She was appointed Member of the Order of the British Empire (MBE) in the 2014 Birthday Honours for services to Paralympic sport.
