= Alpine skiing at the 2014 Winter Paralympics – Men's slalom =

Men's slalom at the XI Paralympic Winter Games
- Paralympic alpine skiing
- Venue: Rosa Khutor Alpine Resort, Krasnaya Polyana, Russia
- Dates: 13 March 2014

Men's slalom (visually impaired) at the XI Paralympic Winter Games
- Competitors: 17 from 9 nations

Medalists
1st place, gold medalist(s)		Valerii Redkozubov; Guide: Evgeny Geroev	Russia
2nd place, silver medalist(s)		Yon Santacana Maiztegui; Guide: Miguel Galindo Garces	Spain
3rd place, bronze medalist(s)		Chris Williamson; Guide: Nick Brush	Canada

Men's slalom (sitting) at the XI Paralympic Winter Games
- Competitors: 41 from 21 nations

Medalists
1st place, gold medalist(s)		Takeshi Suzuki	Japan
2nd place, silver medalist(s)		Philipp Bonadimann	Austria
3rd place, bronze medalist(s)		Roman Rabl	Austria

Men's slalom (standing) at the XI Paralympic Winter Games
- Competitors: 51 from 24 nations

Medalists
1st place, gold medalist(s)		Alexey Bugaev	Russia
2nd place, silver medalist(s)		Vincent Gauthier-Manuel	France
3rd place, bronze medalist(s)		Alexander Alyabyev	Russia

The men's slalom competition of the 2014 Winter Paralympics was held at Rosa Khutor Alpine Resort near Krasnaya Polyana, Russia. The competition took place on 13 March 2014.

== Medal table ==
* Host nation (Russia)

Rank	Nation	Gold	Silver	Bronze	Total
1	Russia (RUS)*	2	0	1	3
2	Japan (JPN)	1	0	0	1
3	Austria (AUT)	0	1	1	2
4	France (FRA)	0	1	0	1
4	Spain (ESP)	0	1	0	1
6	Canada (CAN)	0	0	1	1
Totals (6 entries)		3	3	3	9

== Visually impaired ==
In the visually impaired slalom, the athlete with a visual impairment has a sighted guide. The two skiers are considered a team, and dual medals are awarded.

Rank	Bib	Name	Country	Run 1	Rank	Run 2	Rank	Total	Difference
1st place, gold medalist(s)	7	Valerii Redkozubov; Guide: Evgeny Geroev	Russia	49.69	1	53.52	1	1:43.21	-
2nd place, silver medalist(s)	10	Yon Santacana Maiztegui; Guide: Miguel Galindo Garces	Spain	53.21	7	53.61	2	1:46.82	+3.61
3rd place, bronze medalist(s)	1	Chris Williamson; Guide: Nick Brush	Canada	50.18	=2	58.43	6	1:48.61	+5.40
4	9	Mark Bathum; Guide: Cade Yamamoto	United States	53.28	8	55.85	3	1:49.13	+5.92
5	2	Maciej Krezel; Guide: Anna Ogarzynska	Poland	53.68	9	56.26	4	1:49.94	+6.73
6	12	Radomir Dudas; Guide: Michal Cerven	Slovakia	56.93	12	57.53	5	1:54.46	+11.25
7	6	Michal Beladic; Guide: Filip Motyka	Slovakia	56.85	11	1:02.56	8	1:59.41	+16.20
8	14	Patrik Hetmer; Guide: Miroslav Macala	Czech Republic	1:01.60	14	1:01.87	7	2:03.47	+20.26
9	14	Alexander Fedoruk; Guide: Artem Zagorodskikh	Russia	1:00.20	13	1:03.97	9	2:04.17	+20.96
10	16	Dmytro Kuzmin; Guide: Sergii Dorosh	Ukraine	1:06.64	15	1:06.17	10	2:12.81	+29.60
11	17	Damir Mizdrak; Guide: Luka Debeljak	Croatia	1:17.19	16	1:27.67	11	2:44.86	+1:01.65
	4	Jakub Krako; Guide: Martin Motyka	Slovakia	50.18	=2	DNF			
	5	Gabriel Juan Gorce Yepes; Guide: Josep Arnau Ferrer Ventura	Spain	52.14	6	DNF			
	8	Ivan Frantsev; Guide: German Agranovskii	Russia	55.19	10	DNF			
	11	Mac Marcoux; Guide: Robin Femy	Canada	52.03	5	DNF			
	3	Miroslav Haraus; Guide: Maros Hudik	Slovakia	50.34	4	DSQ			
	13	Marek Kubacka; Guide:Natalia Karpisova	Slovakia	DNF					

== Sitting ==
Rank	Bib	Name	Country	Run 1	Rank	Run 2	Rank	Total	Difference
1st place, gold medalist(s)	80	Takeshi Suzuki	Japan	54.35	2	59.43	1	1:53.78	-
2nd place, silver medalist(s)	81	Philipp Bonadimann	Austria	54.59	3	1:01.87	5	1:56.46	+2.68
3rd place, bronze medalist(s)	72	Roman Rabl	Austria	55.79	5	1:00.85	2	1:56.64	+2.86
4	82	Taiki Morii	Japan	56.87	8	1:00.87	3	1:57.74	+3.96
5	69	Yohann Taberlet	France	55.56	4	1:02.24	6	1:57.80	+4.02
6	88	Cyril More	France	56.93	9	1:02.65	8	1:59.58	+5.80
7	85	Akira Kano	Japan	58.12	14	1:01.67	4	1:59.79	+6.01
8	78	Gerald Hayden	United States	57.59	11	1:02.57	7	2:00.16	+6.38
9	75	Dietmar Dorn	Austria	56.62	7	1:03.59	9	2:00.21	+6.88
10	74	Frederic Francois	France	58.62	15	1:06.53	11	2:05.15	+11.37
11	100	Ben Sneesby	Great Britain	1:01.62	17	1:03.68	10	2:05.30	+11.52
12	73	Andreas Kapfinger	Austria	1:02.27	18	1:10.11	12	2:12.38	+18.60
13	101	Igor Sikorski	Poland	1:12.85	25	1:10.70	13	2:23.55	+29.77
14	97	Oscar Antonio Espallargas Juarez	Spain	1:06.65	23	1:16.92	14	2:23.57	+29.79
15	99	Thomas Jacobsen	Norway	1:10.61	24	1:19.60	15	2:30.21	+36.43
	77	Heath Calhoun	United States	57.78	13	DNF			
	79	Dino Sokolovic	Croatia	52.74	1	DNF			
	84	Jasmin Bambur	United States	57.57	10	DNF			
	86	Kenji Natsume	Japan	1:04.26	21	DNF			
	87	Scott Meyer	United States	1:04.08	20	DNF			
	91	Park Jong-seork	South Korea	1:04.61	22	DNF			
	93	Oldrich Jelinek	Czech Republic	1:03.87	19	DNF			
	94	Kurt Oatway	Canada	57.61	12	DNF			
	96	Corey Peters	New Zealand	59.95	16	DNF			
	104	Nikolai Shuvalov	Russia	1:33.51	26	DNF			
	83	Thomas Nolte	Germany	56.07	6	DSQ			
	92	Christoph Kunz	Switzerland	DNS					
	105	Ulrik Nyvold	Denmark	DNS					
	70	Josh Dueck	Canada	DNF					
	71	Georg Kreiter	Germany	DNF					
	76	Jean Yves le Meur	France	DNF					
	89	Caleb Brousseau	Canada	DNF					
	90	Maurizio Nicoli	Switzerland	DNF					
	95	Akira Taniguchi	Japan	DNF					
	98	Rafal Szumiec	Poland	DNF					
	103	Lee Chi-won	South Korea	DNF					
	106	Johann Thor Holmgrimsson	Iceland	DNF					
	107	Gal Jakič	Slovenia	DNF					
	108	Xavier Fernandez	Andorra	DNF					
	109	Efthymios Kalaras	Greece	DNF					
	102	Mick Brennan	Great Britain	DSQ					

== Standing ==
Rank	Bib	Name	Country	Run 1	Rank	Run 2	Rank	Total	Difference
1st place, gold medalist(s)	22	Alexey Bugaev	Russia	47.69	1	51.28	1	1:38.97	-
2nd place, silver medalist(s)	18	Vincent Gauthier-Manuel	France	48.13	2	52.11	3	1:40.24	+1.27
3rd place, bronze medalist(s)	24	Alexander Alyabyev	Russia	48.69	3	52.05	2	1:40.74	+1.77
4	20	Toby Kane	Australia	48.92	4	54.56	8	1:43.48	+4.51
5	19	Thomas Grochar	Austria	51.09	11	52.60	4	1:43.69	+4.72
6	28	Matt Hallat	Canada	49.53	5	54.28	7	1:43.81	+4.84
7	30	Adam Hall	New Zealand	50.71	7	53.54	5	1:44.25	+5.28
8	29	Thomas Pfyl	Switzerland	50.90	9	54.18	6	1:45.08	+6.11
9	25	Martin Wuerz	Austria	51.08	10	55.32	9	1:46.40	+7.43
10	36	Andrzej Szczesny	Poland	53.94	15	56.41	10	1:50.35	+11.38
11	39	Masahiko Tokai	Japan	53.03	14	58.14	14	1:51.17	+12.20
12	34	Alexander Vetrov	Russia	54.52	19	57.55	12	1:52.07	+13.10
13	43	Martin Falch	Austria	54.22	16	57.87	13	1:52.09	+13.12
14	42	Martin France	Slovakia	55.77	22	57.37	11	1:53.14	+14.17
15	45	James Whitley	Great Britain	54.84	20	58.59	15	1:53.43	+14.46
16	44	Kirk Schornstein	Canada	54.28	17	59.77	16	1:54.05	+15.08
17	40	Ralph Green	United States	56.70	23	1:00.50	18	1:57.20	+18.23
18	47	Robin Cuche	Switzerland	57.41	25	1:00.28	17	1:57.69	+18.72
19	51	Toshihiro Abe	Japan	55.35	21	1:02.57	20	1:57.92	+18.95
20	64	Sadegh Kalhor	Iran	58.07	28	1:03.17	23	2:01.24	+22.27
21	41	Stanislav Loska	Czech Republic	59.20	29	1:02.47	19	2:01.67	+22.70
22	33	James Stanton	United States	53.01	11	1:09.56	29	2:02.57	+23.60
23	48	Jochi Röthlisberger	Switzerland	59.71	30	1:03.14	21	2:02.85	+23.88
24	55	Mads Andreassen	Norway	1:00.74	31	1:03.15	22	2:03.89	+24.92
25	49	Jorge Migueles	Chile	57.98	27	1:07.42	25	2:05.40	+26.43
26	61	Carlos Javier Codina Thomatis	Argentina	1:02.87	33	1:07.07	24	2:09.94	+30.97
27	59	Marco Zanotti	Italy	1:01.74	32	1:08.31	28	2:10.05	+31.08
28	57	Ian Jansing	United States	1:03.25	34	1:07.50	26	2:10.75	+31.78
29	54	Jasper Balcaen	Belgium	1:05.72	36	1:08.10	27	2:13.82	+34.85
30	58	Fukutaro Yamazaki	Japan	1:05.07	35	1:11.29	31	2:16.36	+37.39
31	63	Andrea Valenti	Italy	1:07.05	38	1:10.05	30	2:17.10	+38.13
32	65	Santiago Vega	Chile	1:14.04	42	1:14.59	32	2:28.63	+49.66
33	62	Jugoslav Milosevic	Serbia	1:10.34	39	1:18.45	34	2:28.79	+49.82
34	68	Mher Avanesyan	Armenia	1:12.01	40	1:18.33	33	2:30.34	+51.37
35	60	Mehmet Çekiç	Turkey	1:12.53	41	1:21.89	35	2:34.42	+55.45
	23	Michael Brügger	Switzerland	54.35	18	DNF			
	31	Mitchell Gourley	Australia	50.75	8	DNF			
	32	Braydon Luscombe	Canada	49.94	6	DNF			
	35	Christophe Brodard	Switzerland	56.79	24	DNF			
	38	Romain Riboud	France	52.94	12	DNF			
	46	Patrick Parnell	United States	1:06.84	37	DNF			
	56	Ugo Bregant	Italy	57.94	26	DNF			
	26	Matthias Lanzinger	Austria	DNS					
	21	Hiraku Misawa	Japan	DNF					
	37	Gakuta Koike	Japan	DNF					
	50	Hansjörg Lantschner	Italy	DNF					
	52	Aleksandr Akhmadulin	Russia	DNF					
	53	Jonathan Lujan	United States	DNF					
	66	Senad Turkovic	Bosnia and Herzegovina	DNF					
	27	Cedric Amafroi-Broisat	France	DSQ					
	67	Ramil Gayazov	Uzbekistan	DSQ					

== See also ==
- Alpine skiing at the 2014 Winter Olympics
