= Alpine skiing at the 2014 Winter Paralympics – Men's giant slalom =

Men's giant slalom at the XI Paralympic Winter Games
- Paralympic alpine skiing
- Venue: Rosa Khutor Alpine Resort, Krasnaya Polyana, Russia
- Dates: 15 March 2014

Men's giant slalom (visually impaired) at the XI Paralympic Winter Games
- Competitors: 18 from 10 nations

Medalists
1st place, gold medalist(s)		Mac Marcoux; Guide: Robin Femy	Canada
2nd place, silver medalist(s)		Jakub Krako; Guide: Martin Motyka	Slovakia
3rd place, bronze medalist(s)		Valerii Redkozubov; Guide: Evgeny Geroev	Russia

Men's giant slalom (sitting) at the XI Paralympic Winter Games
- Competitors: 45 from 25 nations

Medalists
1st place, gold medalist(s)		Christoph Kunz	Switzerland
2nd place, silver medalist(s)		Corey Peters	New Zealand
3rd place, bronze medalist(s)		Roman Rabl	Austria

Men's giant slalom (standing) at the XI Paralympic Winter Games
- Competitors: 49 from 21 nations

Medalists
1st place, gold medalist(s)		Vincent Gauthier-Manuel	France
2nd place, silver medalist(s)		Alexey Bugaev	Russia
3rd place, bronze medalist(s)		Markus Salcher	Austria

The men's giant slalom competition of the 2014 Winter Paralympics was held at Rosa Khutor Alpine Resort near Krasnaya Polyana, Russia. The competition took place on 15 March 2014.

== Medal table ==
* Host nation (Russia)

Rank	Nation	Gold	Silver	Bronze	Total
1	Canada (CAN)	1	0	0	1
1	France (FRA)	1	0	0	1
1	Switzerland (SUI)	1	0	0	1
4	Russia (RUS)*	0	1	1	2
5	New Zealand (NZL)	0	1	0	1
5	Slovakia (SVK)	0	1	0	1
7	Austria (AUT)	0	0	2	2
Totals (7 entries)		3	3	3	9

== Visually impaired ==
In the visually impaired giant slalom, the athlete with a visual impairment has a sighted guide. The two skiers are considered a team, and dual medals are awarded.

Rank	Bib	Name	Country	Run 1	Rank	Run 2	Rank	Total	Difference
1st place, gold medalist(s)	4	Mac Marcoux; Guide: Robin Femy	Canada	1:16.02	1	1:13.60	2	2:29.62	
2nd place, silver medalist(s)	7	Jakub Krako; Guide: Martin Motyka	Slovakia	1:18.41	2	1:13.25	1	2:31.66	+2.04
3rd place, bronze medalist(s)	12	Valerii Redkozubov; Guide: Evgeny Geroev	Russia	1:19.91	4	1:13.66	3	2:33.57	+3.95
4	14	Yon Santacana Maiztegui; Guide: Miguel Galindo Garces	Spain	1:19.61	3	1:15.21	4	2:34.82	+5.20
5	5	Chris Williamson; Guide: Nick Brush	Canada	1:21.29	5	1:16.28	5	2:37.57	+7.95
6	1	Ivan Frantsev; Guide: German Agranovskii	Russia	1:21.51	7	1:19.27	9	2:40.78	+11.16
7	11	Gabriel Juan Gorce Yepes; Guide: Josep Arnau Ferrer Ventura	Spain	1:25.04	12	1:17.14	6	2:42.18	+12.56
8	2	Marek Kubacka; Guide:Natalia Karpisova	Slovakia	1:24.69	11	1:17.83	7	2:42.52	+12.90
9	10	Maciej Krezel; Guide: Anna Ogarzynska	Poland	1:23.62	10	1:19.02	8	2:42.64	+13.02
10	8	Radomir Dudas; Guide: Michal Cerven	Slovakia	1:23.31	9	1:20.11	=10	2:43.42	+13.80
11	9	Michal Beladic; Guide: Filip Motyka	Slovakia	1:26.95	13	1:20.11	=10	2:47.06	+17.44
12	15	Alexander Fedoruk; Guide: Artem Zagorodskikh	Russia	1:28.48	14	1:26.48	12	2:54.96	+25.34
13	17	Dmytro Kuzmin; Guide: Sergii Dorosh	Ukraine	1:38.85	16	1:36.12	13	3:14.97	+45.35
14	18	Damir Mizdrak; Guide: Luka Debeljak	Croatia	1:51.27	17	1:50.93	14	3:42.20	+1:12.58
	6	Miroslav Haraus; Guide: Maros Hudik	Slovakia	1:22.99	8	DNF			
	13	Alessandro Daldoss; Guide: Luca Negrini	Italy	1:21.43	6	DNF			
	16	Patrik Hetmer; Guide: Miroslav Macala	Czech Republic	1:29.82	15	DNF			
	3	Mark Bathum; Guide: Cade Yamamoto	United States	DNF					

== Sitting ==
Rank	Bib	Name	Country	Run 1	Rank	Run 2	Rank	Total	Difference
1st place, gold medalist(s)	78	Christoph Kunz	Switzerland	1:18.63	2	1:14.10	1	2:32.73	
2nd place, silver medalist(s)	70	Corey Peters	New Zealand	1:18.10	1	1:15.10	6	2:33.20	+0.47
3rd place, bronze medalist(s)	68	Roman Rabl	Austria	1:18.87	3	1:14.44	3	2:33.31	+0.58
4	83	Yohann Taberlet	France	1:19.75	5	1:15.15	7	2:34.90	+2.17
5	82	Frederic Francois	France	1:20.26	6	1:14.71	4	2:34.97	+2.24
6	75	Heath Calhoun	United States	1:20.91	7	1:14.12	2	2:35.03	+2.30
7	77	Taiki Morii	Japan	1:21.26	8	1:14.82	5	2:36.08	+3.35
8	72	Thomas Nolte	Germany	1:21.86	10	1:15.25	8	2:37.11	+4.38
9	84	Jean Yves le Meur	France	1:21.65	9	1:15.82	9	2:37.47	+4.74
10	74	Takeshi Suzuki	Japan	1:22.11	11	1:16.90	10	2:39.01	+6.28
11	85	Cyril More	France	1:23.38	13	1:17.48	11	2:40.86	+8.13
12	94	Dino Sokolovic	Croatia	1:24.67	16	1:18.36	12	2:43.03	+10.30
13	97	Oscar Antonio Espallargas Juarez	Spain	1:24.07	15	1:19.94	13	2:44.01	+11.28
14	101	Mick Brennan	Great Britain	1:23.79	14	1:21.09	14	2:44.88	+12.15
15	87	Dietmar Dorn	Austria	1:25.33	18	1:21.50	15	2:46.83	+14.10
16	80	Kenji Natsume	Japan	1:26.20	19	1:22.27	16	2:48.47	+15.74
17	89	Jasmin Bambur	United States	1:26.42	20	1:24.57	17	2:50.99	+18.26
18	88	Esat Hilmi Bayindirli	Turkey	1:31.71	24	1:28.33	18	3:00.04	+27.31
19	106	Enrique Plantey	Argentina	1:34.37	25	1:31.28	19	3:05.65	+32.92
20	102	Rafal Szumiec	Poland	1:39.80	26	1:34.64	20	3:14.44	+41.71
21	108	Nikolai Shuvalov	Russia	1:41.94	28	1:40.46	21	3:22.40	+49.67
22	112	Efthymios Kalaras	Greece	1:52.77	30	1:44.83	23	3:37.60	+1:04.87
23	110	Johann Thor Holmgrimsson	Iceland	1:56.84	31	1:41.59	22	3:38.43	+1:05.70
	73	Christopher Devlin-Young	United States	1:22.23	12	DNF			
	81	Georg Kreiter	Germany	1:19.16	4	DNF			
	86	Arly Velasquez	Mexico	1:25.14	17	DNF			
	90	Maurizio Nicoli	Switzerland	1:29.91	23	DNF			
	93	Akira Taniguchi	Japan	1:28.31	22	DNF			
	100	Ben Sneesby	Great Britain	1:26.96	21	DNF			
	107	Ulrik Nyvold	Denmark	1:41.21	27	DNF			
	109	Gal Jakič	Slovenia	1:49.66	29	DNF			
	92	Franz Hanfstingl	Germany	DNS					
	96	Stephen Lawler	United States	DNS					
	104	Thomas Jacobsen	Norway	DNS					
	69	Caleb Brousseau	Canada	DNF					
	71	Akira Kano	Japan	DNF					
	76	Josh Dueck	Canada	DNF					
	79	Kees-Jan van der Klooster	Netherlands	DNF					
	91	Kurt Oatway	Canada	DNF					
	95	Oldrich Jelinek	Czech Republic	DNF					
	98	Scott Meyer	United States	DNF					
	103	Park Jong-seork	South Korea	DNF					
	105	Lee Chi-won	South Korea	DNF					
	99	Igor Sikorski	Poland	DSQ					
	111	Xavier Fernandez	Andorra	DSQ					

== Standing ==
Rank	Bib	Name	Country	Run 1	Rank	Run 2	Rank	Total	Difference
1st place, gold medalist(s)	27	Vincent Gauthier-Manuel	France	1:14.72	1	1:11.15	1	2:25.87	
2nd place, silver medalist(s)	19	Alexey Bugaev	Russia	1:16.15	3	1:11.72	2	2:27.87	+2.00
3rd place, bronze medalist(s)	20	Markus Salcher	Austria	1:15.95	2	1:12.19	3	2:28.14	+2.27
4	30	Martin France	Slovakia	1:18.74	6	1:12.92	4	2:31.66	+5.79
5	23	Thomas Pfyl	Switzerland	1:18.31	5	1:13.51	5	2:31.82	+5.95
6	42	Toshihiro Abe	Japan	1:21.54	11	1:14.79	6	2:36.33	+10.46
7	35	Martin Wuerz	Austria	1:20.93	9	1:15.78	8	2:36.71	+10.84
8	32	Romain Riboud	France	1:21.04	10	1:16.42	10	2:37.46	+11.59
9	25	Gakuta Koike	Japan	1:22.73	15	1:15.34	7	2:38.07	+12.20
10	40	Masahiko Tokai	Japan	1:21.85	12	1:16.27	9	2:38.12	+12.25
11	44	Martin Falch	Austria	1:22.95	16	1:17.25	11	2:40.20	+14.33
12	51	Robin Cuche	Switzerland	1:23.31	17	1:17.26	12	2:40.57	+14.70
13	39	Kirk Schornstein	Canada	1:22.51	14	1:18.46	14	2:40.97	+15.10
14	52	James Whitley	Great Britain	1:24.64	20	1:18.14	13	2:42.78	+16.91
15	54	Christian Lanthaler	Italy	1:24.85	21	1:18.97	15	2:43.82	+17.95
16	45	Ralph Green	United States	1:24.20	18	1:20.67	17	2:44.87	+19.00
17	58	Marco Zanotti	Italy	1:26.21	22	1:19.28	16	2:45.49	+19.62
18	37	Christophe Brodard	Switzerland	1:24.61	19	1:21.53	18	2:46.14	+20.27
19	47	Jochi Röthlisberger	Switzerland	1:26.67	24	1:21.96	19	2:48.63	+22.76
20	43	Jorge Migueles	Chile	1:26.41	23	1:22.39	21	2:48.80	+22.93
21	57	Mads Andreassen	Norway	1:26.84	25	1:22.08	20	2:48.92	+23.05
22	53	Andrzej Szczesny	Poland	1:29.43	28	1:22.70	22	2:52.13	+26.26
23	56	Jasper Balcaen	Belgium	1:29.13	27	1:23.74	23	2:52.87	+27.00
24	50	Joel Hunt	United States	1:31.93	30	1:26.40	25	2:58.33	+32.46
25	61	Carlos Javier Codina Thomatis	Argentina	1:33.96	32	1:24.40	24	2:58.36	+32.49
26	55	Fukutaro Yamazaki	Japan	1:31.47	29	1:27.56	27	2:59.03	+33.16
27	60	Tyler Carter	United States	1:33.62	31	1:26.52	26	3:00.14	+34.27
28	64	Mehmet Çekiç	Turkey	1:38.38	33	1:31.35	28	3:09.73	+43.86
29	63	Jugoslav Milosevic	Serbia	1:40.94	34	1:41.42	29	3:22.36	+56.49
	33	James Stanton	United States	1:22.27	13	DNS			
	22	Alexander Vetrov	Russia	1:19.21	8	DNF			
	26	Mitchell Gourley	Australia	1:16.16	4	DNF			
	31	Michael Brügger	Switzerland	1:18.96	7	DNF			
	41	Hansjörg Lantschner	Italy	1:27.58	26	DNF			
	66	Senad Turkovic	Bosnia and Herzegovina	1:58.16	35	DNF			
	46	Stanislav Loska	Czech Republic	DNS					
	67	Ramil Gayazov	Uzbekistan	DNS					
	21	Toby Kane	Australia	DNF					
	24	Alexander Alyabyev	Russia	DNF					
	28	Matthias Lanzinger	Austria	DNF					
	29	Hikaru Misawa	Japan	DNF					
	34	Cedric Amafroi-Broisat	France	DNF					
	38	Thomas Grochar	Austria	DNF					
	48	Aleksandr Akhmadulin	Russia	DNF					
	49	Jonathan Lujan	United States	DNF					
	59	Andrea Valenti	Italy	DNF					
	62	Santiago Vega	Chile	DNF					
	65	Mher Avanesyan	Armenia	DNF					
	36	Nicolo Maria Orsini	Italy	DSQ					

== See also ==
- Alpine skiing at the 2014 Winter Olympics
