= 2011 IPC Alpine Skiing World Championships – Team event =

Team event at the 2011 IPC Alpine Skiing World Championships
- Alpine skiing
- Venue: Kandahar Banchetta Giovanni N.
- Location: Sestriere
- Date: January 23

The team event competitions of the 2011 IPC Alpine Skiing World Championships were held at Kandahar Banchetta Giovanni N., in Sestriere, Italy on January 23. The skiers competed in giant slalom.

== Overall Results ==
Rank	Nation	Team Competitor		Competitor time	Total	Difference
1st place, gold medalist(s)	France 1 (FRA 1)	M sta.	Vincent Gauthier-Manuel	2:11.61	6:55.09	
1st place, gold medalist(s)	France 1 (FRA 1)	M v.i.	Nicolas Berejny; Guide: Gregory Nouhaud	2:19.94	6:55.09	
1st place, gold medalist(s)	France 1 (FRA 1)	W sta.	Marie Bochet	2:23.54	6:55.09	
1st place, gold medalist(s)	France 1 (FRA 1)	M sit.	Cyril More	not evaluated	6:55.09	
1st place, gold medalist(s)	France 1 (FRA 1)	M sit.	Yohann Taberlet	not evaluated	6:55.09	
2nd place, silver medalist(s)	Germany (GER)	M sta.	Gerd Schönfelder	2:12.74	6:56.28	+1.19
2nd place, silver medalist(s)	Germany (GER)	W sta.	Andrea Rothfuss	2:21.42	6:56.28	+1.19
2nd place, silver medalist(s)	Germany (GER)	M sit.	Thomas Nolte	2:22.12	6:56.28	+1.19
2nd place, silver medalist(s)	Germany (GER)	M sit.	Georg Kreiter	not evaluated	6:56.28	+1.19
2nd place, silver medalist(s)	Germany (GER)	M sit.	Franz Hanfstingl	not evaluated	6:56.28	+1.19
2nd place, silver medalist(s)	Germany (GER)	W sit.	Anna Schaffelhuber	not evaluated	6:56.28	+1.19
3rd place, bronze medalist(s)	Slovakia 1 (SVK 1)	W v.i.	Henrieta Farkasova; Guide: Natalia Subrtova	2:19.02	7:03.86	+8.77
3rd place, bronze medalist(s)	Slovakia 1 (SVK 1)	M v.i.	Jakub Krako; Guide: Dusan Simo	2:20.27	7:03.86	+8.77
3rd place, bronze medalist(s)	Slovakia 1 (SVK 1)	M sta.	Martin France	2:24.57	7:03.86	+8.77
3rd place, bronze medalist(s)	Slovakia 1 (SVK 1)	M v.i.	Norbert Holik; Guide: Lubos Bosela	not evaluated	7:03.86	+8.77
4	Russia (RUS)	M sta.	Alexandr Alyabyev	2:14.99	7:05.34	+10.25
4	Russia (RUS)	M v.i.	Ivan Frantsev; Guide: Evgeny Pinaev	2:18.19	7:05.34	+10.25
4	Russia (RUS)	W v.i.	Alexandra Frantseva; Guide: Evgenia Kolosovskaya	2:32.16	7:05.34	+10.25
4	Russia (RUS)	M sta.	Aleksandr Vetrov	not evaluated	7:05.34	+10.25
4	Russia (RUS)	W sta.	Mariya Papulova	not evaluated	7:05.34	+10.25
5	Slovakia 2 (SVK 2)	M v.i.	Radomir Dudas; Guide: Maros Hudik	2:18.26	7:11.52	+16.43
5	Slovakia 2 (SVK 2)	W sta.	Petra Smarzova	2:26.57	7:11.52	+16.43
5	Slovakia 2 (SVK 2)	M v.i.	Marek Kubacka; Guide: Branislav Mazgut	2:26.69	7:11.52	+16.43
5	Slovakia 2 (SVK 2)	M v.i.	Miroslav Haraus; Guide: Martin Makovnik	not evaluated	7:11.52	+16.43
6	Austria (AUT)	M sta.	Markus Salcher	2:16.99	7:15.25	+20.16
6	Austria (AUT)	M sta.	Andreas Preiss	2:19.03	7:15.25	+20.16
6	Austria (AUT)	W sit.	Claudia Loesch	2:39.23	7:15.25	+20.16
6	Austria (AUT)	M sit.	Philipp Bonadimann	not evaluated	7:15.25	+20.16
6	Austria (AUT)	M sit.	Andreas Kapfinger	not evaluated	7:15.25	+20.16
6	Austria (AUT)	M sit.	Roman Rabl	not evaluated	7:15.25	+20.16
7	Canada (CAN)	M sit.	Josh Dueck	2:24.50	7:21.13	+26.04
7	Canada (CAN)	M sta.	Kirk Schornstein	2:24.79	7:21.13	+26.04
7	Canada (CAN)	W sta.	Karolina Wisniewska	2:31.84	7:21.13	+26.04
7	Canada (CAN)	M sta.	Matt Hallat	not evaluated	7:21.13	+26.04
8	Spain (ESP)	M v.i.	Yon Santacana Maiztegui; Guide: Miguel Galindo Garces	2:16.41	7:42.46	+47.37
8	Spain (ESP)	M v.i.	Gabriel Juan Gorce Yepes; Guide: Josep Arnau Ferrer Ventura	2:29.84	7:42.46	+47.37
8	Spain (ESP)	W sta.	Ursula Pueyo Marimon	2:56.21	7:42.46	+47.37
8	Spain (ESP)	M sta.	Jacob Guilera Casas	not evaluated	7:42.46	+47.37
8	Spain (ESP)	M sit.	Oscar Espallargas	not evaluated	7:42.46	+47.37
9	France 2 (FRA 2)	M sit.	Frederic Francois	2:26.67	DNF	
9	France 2 (FRA 2)	W sta.	Solène Jambaqué	2:27.10	DNF	
9	France 2 (FRA 2)	M sit.	Jean Yves Le Meur	not evaluated	DNF	
9	France 2 (FRA 2)	M sta.	Lionel Brun	not evaluated	DNF	

Key: DNF = Did Not Finish

== Individual Results ==
=== Women, visually impaired ===
The athletes with a visual impairment has a sighted guide. The two skiers are considered a team, and dual medals are awarded.

Rank	Athlete	Nation	Run 1	Rank	Run 2	Rank	Total	Notes
1	Henrieta Farkasova; Guide: Natalia Subrtova	(Slovakia) SVK (1)	1:09.06	1	1:09.96	1	2:19.02	
2	Alexandra Frantseva; Guide: Evgenia Kolosovskaya	(Russia) RUS	1:14.89	2	1:17.27	2	2:32.16	

=== Women, standing ===
Rank	Athlete	Nation	Run 1	Rank	Run 2	Rank	Total	Notes
1	Andrea Rothfuss	(Germany) GER	1:10.09	1	1:11.33	2	2:21.42	
2	Marie Bochet	(France) FRA (1)	1:13.26	4	1:10.28	1	2:23.54	
3	Petra Smarzova	(Slovakia) SVK (2)	1:12.95	2	1:13.62	3	2:26.57	
4	Solène Jambaqué	(France) FRA (2)	1:13.07	3	1:14.03	4	2:27.10	
5	Karolina Wisniewska	(Canada) CAN	1:15.91	5	1:15.93	5	2:31.84	
6	Mariya Papulova	(Russia) RUS	1:19.40	6	1:23.20	6	2:42.60	not evaluated
7	Ursula Pueyo Marimon	(Spain) ESP	1:26.99	7	1:29.22	7	2:56.21	

=== Women, sitting ===
Rank	Athlete	Nation	Run 1	Rank	Run 2	Rank	Total	Notes
1	Claudia Loesch	(Austria) AUT	1:19.38	1	1:19.85	2	2:39.23	
2	Anna Schaffelhuber	(Germany) GER	1:20.20	2	1:19.78	1	2:39.98	not evaluated

=== Men, visually impaired ===
The athletes with a visual impairment has a sighted guide. The two skiers are considered a team, and dual medals are awarded.

Rank	Athlete	Nation	Run 1	Rank	Run 2	Rank	Total	Notes
1	Yon Santacana Maiztegui; Guide: Miguel Galindo Garces	(Spain) ESP	1:08.69	2	1:07.72	1	2:16.41	
2	Ivan Frantsev; Guide: Evgeny Pinaev	(Russia) RUS	1:08.87	3	1:09.32	4	2:18.19	
3	Radomir Dudas; Guide: Maros Hudik	(Slovakia) SVK (2)	1:09.03	4	1:09.23	3	2:18.26	
4	Nicolas Berejny; Guide: Gregory Nouhaud	(France) FRA (1)	1:11.28	5	1:08.66	2	2:19.94	
5	Jakub Krako; Guide: Dusan Simo	(Slovakia) SVK (1)	1:06.62	1	1:13.65	6	2:20.27	
6	Norbert Holik; Guide: Lubos Bosela	(Slovakia) SVK (1)	1:12.12	7	1:12.54	5	2:24.66	not evaluated
7	Marek Kubacka; Guide: Branislav Mazgut	(Slovakia) SVK (2)	1:11.85	6	1:14.84	8	2:26.69	
8	Gabriel Juan Gorce Yepes; Guide: Josep Arnau Ferrer Ventura	(Spain) ESP	1:15.21	8	1:14.63	7	2:29.84	
	Miroslav Haraus; Guide: Martin Makovnik	(Slovakia) SVK (2)	DSQ					not evaluated

Key: DSQ = Disqualified

=== Men, standing ===
Rank	Athlete	Nation	Run 1	Rank	Run 2	Rank	Total	Notes
1	Vincent Gauthier-Manuel	(France) FRA (1)	1:05.83	2	1:05.78	1	2:11.61	
2	Gerd Schönfelder	(Germany) GER	1:05.65	1	1:07.09	2	2:12.74	
3	Alexandr Alyabyev	(Russia) RUS	1:07.78	3	1:07.21	3	2:14.99	
4	Markus Salcher	(Austria) AUT	1:08.08	4	1:08.91	4	2:16.99	
5	Andreas Preiss	(Austria) AUT	1:09.44	5	1:09.59	5	2:19.03	
6	Martin France	(Slovakia) SVK (1)	1:12.39	7	1:12.18	6	2:24.57	
7	Kirk Schornstein	(Canada) CAN	1:12.33	6	1:12.46	8	2:24.79	
8	Aleksandr Vetrov	(Russia) RUS	1:13.28	8	1:12.20	7	2:25.48	not evaluated
9	Matt Hallat	(Canada) CAN	1:14.03	9	1:15.83	9	2:29.86	not evaluated
10	Jacob Guilera Casas	(Spain) ESP	1:15.49	10	1:15.90	10	2:31.39	not evaluated
	Lionel Brun	(France) FRA (2)	DNF					not evaluated

Key: DNF = Did Not Finish

=== Men, sitting ===
Rank	Athlete	Nation	Run 1	Rank	Run 2	Rank	Total	Notes
1	Thomas Nolte	(Germany) GER	1:10.28	2	1:11.84	2	2:22.12	
2	Cyril More	(France) FRA (1)	1:12.99	7	1:10.24	1	2:23.23	not evaluated
3	Josh Dueck	(Canada) CAN	1:11.71	4	1:12.79	3	2:24.50	
4	Andreas Kapfinger	(Austria) AUT	1:12.31	6	1:13.27	5	2:25.58	not evaluated
5	Franz Hanfstingl	(Germany) GER	1:13.49	9	1:13.10	4	2:26.59	not evaluated
6	Frederic Francois	(France) FRA (2)	1:12.01	5	1:14.66	8	2:26.67	
7	Yohann Taberlet	(France) FRA (1)	1:13.15	8	1:13.57	6	2:26.72	not evaluated
8	Roman Rabl	(Austria) AUT	1:14.70	10	1:14.08	7	2:28.78	not evaluated
9	Oscar Espallargas	(Spain) ESP	1:19.04	11	1:18.75	9	2:37.79	not evaluated
	Georg Kreiter	(Germany) GER		1	DNF			not evaluated
	Jean Yves Le Meur	(France) FRA (2)		12	DNF			not evaluated
	Philipp Bonadimann	(Austria) AUT		3	DNS			not evaluated

Key: DNS = Did Not Start, DNF = Did Not Finish
