= Greece at the 2014 Winter Paralympics =

- The flag of Greece
- IPC code: GRE
- NPC: Hellenic Paralympic Committee
- Website: www.paralympic.gr

in Sochi
- Competitors: 1 in 1 sport
- Medals: Gold 0 Silver 0 Bronze 0 Total 0

Winter Paralympics appearances (overview)
- 2002; 2006; 2010; 2014; 2018; 2022; 2026

Greece sent a delegation to compete at the 2014 Winter Paralympics in Sochi, Russia from 7–16 March 2014. This was Greece's third appearance at a Winter Paralympic Games. Their only athlete was alpine skier Efthymios Kalaras. He suffered a spinal cord injury two decades before these Paralympics, and was a returning Paralympic silver medalist from the 2004 Summer Paralympics in the discus throw. He finished 22nd in the sitting giant slalom, nearly a minute behind the gold medal time.

== Background ==
Greece first joined Paralympic competition at the 1976 Summer Paralympics, and made their Winter Paralympics debut at the 2002 Winter Paralympics. They have participated in every Summer Paralympics since, and missed the Winter Paralympics only once, in 2006. This made Sochi their third appearance at a Winter Paralympics. While Greece have won over 90 medals at Summer Paralympics, they have never won one in Winter Paralympics competition. The 2014 Winter Paralympics were held from 7–16 March 2014, in Sochi, Russia; 45 countries and 547 athletes took part in the multi-sport event. Efthymios Kalaras was the only athlete sent by Greece to Sochi. He was chosen as the Greek flag-bearer for the parade of nations during the opening ceremony, and the closing ceremony.

== Disability classification ==
Every participant at the Paralympics has their disability grouped into one of five disability categories: amputation, the condition may be congenital or sustained through injury or illness; cerebral palsy; wheelchair athletes, though there is often overlap between this and other categories; visual impairment, including blindness; and Les Autres, any physical disability that does not fall strictly under one of the other categories, like dwarfism or multiple sclerosis. Each Paralympic sport then has its own classifications, dependent upon the specific physical demands of competition. Events are given a code, made of numbers and letters, describing the type of event and classification of the athletes competing. Events with "B" in the code are for athletes with visual impairment, codes LW1 to LW9 are for athletes who stand to compete and LW10 to LW12 are for athletes who compete sitting down. Alpine skiing events grouped athletes into separate competitions for sitting, standing and visually impaired athletes.

== Alpine skiing ==
Efthymios Kalaras was 38 years old at the time of the Sochi Paralympics. He suffers from an acquired spinal cord injury obtained in a motorcycle accident 20 years before the Sochi Paralympics, and is classified LW10-1, meaning he competes in a sitting position. LW10 classified athletes have "no or minimal trunk stability, for example due to spinal cord injuries or spina bifida. They therefore rely mainly on their arms to manoeuvre the sit-ski." Kalaras previously won a silver medal in the discus throw at the 2004 Summer Paralympics. He took up skiing three years before the Sochi Paralympics, and had only spent a single year in international competitions. He was the first Greek athlete to participate in both a Summer and a Winter Paralympics. On 13 March, he took part in the sitting slalom, but failed to finish the first run, missing a gate around 20 seconds into his run. Two days later he participated in the sitting giant slalom, finishing his first run in 1 minute and 52.77 seconds, and his second in a faster 1 minute and 44.83 seconds. Placement was determined by adding up the run times; his total time was 3 minutes and 37.60 seconds, which put him next to last among the 23 classified finishers. The gold medal was won by Christoph Kunz of Switzerland in a time of 2 minutes and 32.73 seconds, the silver medal by Corey Peters of New Zealand and the bronze medal was won by Roman Rabl of Austria.

Athlete	Event	Run 1			Run 2			Final/Total		
Athlete	Event	Time	Diff	Rank	Time	Diff	Rank	Time	Diff	Rank
Efthymios Kalaras	Slalom, sitting	DNF			DNS			did not advance		
Efthymios Kalaras	Giant slalom, sitting	1:52.77	+34.67	30	1:44.83	+30.73	23	3:37.60	+1:04.87	22

== See also ==
- Greece at the Paralympics
- Greece at the 2014 Winter Olympics
