= Alpine skiing at the 2014 Winter Paralympics – Men's downhill =

Men's downhill at the XI Paralympic Winter Games
- Paralympic alpine skiing
- Venue: Rosa Khutor Alpine Resort, Krasnaya Polyana, Russia
- Dates: 8 March 2014
- Competitors: 50 from 15 nations

Men's downhill (visually impaired) at the XI Paralympic Winter Games
- Competitors: 11 from 7 nations

Medalists
1st place, gold medalist(s)		Yon Santacana Maiztegui; Guide: Miguel Galindo Garces	Spain
2nd place, silver medalist(s)		Miroslav Haraus; Guide: Maros Hudik	Slovakia
3rd place, bronze medalist(s)		Mac Marcoux; Guide: Robin Femy	Canada

Men's downhill (standing) at the XI Paralympic Winter Games
- Competitors: 17 from 8 nations

Medalists
1st place, gold medalist(s)		Markus Salcher	Austria
2nd place, silver medalist(s)		Alexey Bugaev	Russia
3rd place, bronze medalist(s)		Vincent Gauthier-Manuel	France

Men's downhill (sitting) at the XI Paralympic Winter Games
- Competitors: 22 from 10 nations

Medalists
1st place, gold medalist(s)		Akira Kano	Japan
2nd place, silver medalist(s)		Josh Dueck	Canada
3rd place, bronze medalist(s)		Takeshi Suzuki	Japan

The Men's downhill competition of the 2014 Winter Paralympics was held at Rosa Khutor Alpine Resort near Krasnaya Polyana, Russia. The competition took place on 8 March 2014.

== Medal table ==
* Host nation (Russia)

Rank	Nation	Gold	Silver	Bronze	Total
1	Japan (JPN)	1	0	1	2
2	Austria (AUT)	1	0	0	1
2	Spain (ESP)	1	0	0	1
4	Canada (CAN)	0	1	1	2
5	Russia (RUS)*	0	1	0	1
5	Slovakia (SVK)	0	1	0	1
7	France (FRA)	0	0	1	1
Totals (7 entries)		3	3	3	9

== Visually impaired ==
In the downhill visually impaired, the athlete with a visual impairment has a sighted guide. The two skiers are considered a team, and dual medals are awarded.

Rank	Bib	Name	Country	Time	Difference
1st place, gold medalist(s)	22	Yon Santacana Maiztegui Guide: Miguel Galindo Garces	Spain	1:21.76	—
2nd place, silver medalist(s)	21	Miroslav Haraus; Guide: Maros Hudik	Slovakia	1:22.01	+0.25
3rd place, bronze medalist(s)	26	Mac Marcoux Guide: Robin Femy	Canada	1:23.02	+1.26
4	28	Jakub Krako Guide: Martin Motyka	Slovakia	1:23.38	+1.62
5	25	Mark Bathum Guide: Cade Yamamoto	United States	1:23.81	+2.05
6	29	Alessandro Daldoss Guide: Luca Negrini	Italy	1:23.97	+2.21
7	24	Gabriel Juan Gorce Yepes Guide: Josep Arnau Ferrer Ventura	Spain	1:24.59	+2,83
8	27	Hugo Thomas Guide: Luana Bergamin	Switzerland	1:26.02	+4.26
9	23	Ivan Frantsev; Guide: German Agranovskii	Russia	1:30.67	+8.91
10	31	Radomir Dudas Guide: Michal Cerven	Slovakia	1:33.37	+11.61
11	30	Michal Beladic; Guide: Filip Motyka	Slovakia	1:35.98	+14.22

== Standing ==
Rank	Bib	Name	Country	Time	Difference
1st place, gold medalist(s)	37	Markus Salcher	Austria	1:24.35	—
2nd place, silver medalist(s)	43	Alexey Bugaev	Russia	1:24.41	+0.06
3rd place, bronze medalist(s)	38	Vincent Gauthier-Manuel	France	1:25.30	+0.95
4	39	Matthias Lanzinger	Austria	1:25.57	+1.22
5	42	Michael Brügger	Switzerland	1:26.08	+1.73
6	32	Toby Kane	Australia	1:26.25	+1,90
7	34	Mitchell Gourley	Australia	1:26.71	+2,36
8	47	Christian Lanthaler	Italy	1:27.99	+3.64
9	48	Hiraku Misawa	Japan	1:28.13	+3.78
10	36	Thomas Pfyl	Switzerland	1:28.31	+3.96
11	46	Alexander Alyabyev (alpine skier)	Russia	1:28.70	+4.35
12	45	Romain Riboud	France	1:29.20	+4.85
13	33	Alexander Vetrov	Russia	1:30.19	+5.84
14	41	Bart Verbruggen	Netherlands	1:30.32	+5.97
	35	Kirk Schornstein	Canada	DNF	
	40	Braydon Luscombe	Canada	DNF	
	44	Gakuta Koike	Japan	DNF	

== Sitting ==
Rank	Bib	Name	Country	Time	Difference
1st place, gold medalist(s)	62	Akira Kano	Japan	1:23.80	—
2nd place, silver medalist(s)	54	Josh Dueck	Canada	1:24.19	+0.39
3rd place, bronze medalist(s)	59	Takeshi Suzuki	Japan	1:24.75	+0.95
4	58	Roman Rabl	Austria	1:25.35	+1.55
5	57	Kurt Oatway	Canada	1:25.46	+1.66
6	49	Caleb Brousseau	Canada	1:25.62	+1.82
7	60	Yohann Taberlet	France	1:26.61	+2.81
8	56	Georg Kreiter	Germany	1:26.65	+2.85
9	64	Christoph Kunz	Switzerland	1:27.10	+3.30
10	52	Christopher Devlin-Young	United States	1:27.84	+4.04
11	69	Thomas Nolte	Germany	1:29.31	+5.51
12	70	Park Jong-Seork	South Korea	1:37.61	+13.81
	50	Reinhold Sampl	Austria	DNS	
	51	Frederic Francois	France	DNF	
	53	Taiki Morii	Japan	DNF	
	55	Kees-Jan van der Klooster	Netherlands	DNF	
	61	Tyler Walker	United States	DNF	
	63	Arly Velasquez	Mexico	DNF	
	65	Franz Hanfstingl	Germany	DNF	
	66	Cyril More	France	DNF	
	67	Kenji Natsume	Japan	DNF	
	68	Jasmin Bambur	United States	DNF	

== See also ==
- Alpine skiing at the 2014 Winter Olympics
