= Andorra at the 2026 Winter Paralympics =

- Flag of Andorra
- IPC code: AND
- NPC: Andorran Adapted Sports Federation

in Milan & Cortina d'Ampezzo, Italy 6 March 2026 – 15 March 2026
- Competitors: 1 (1 man) in 1 sport
- Flag bearer (opening): Roger Puig Davi
- Flag bearer (closing): Roger Puig Davi
- Medals: Gold 0 Silver 0 Bronze 0 Total 0

Winter Paralympics appearances (overview)
- 2002; 2006; 2010; 2014; 2018; 2022; 2026

Andorra was represented at the 2026 Winter Paralympics in Milan & Cortina d'Ampezzo, Italy, which took place between 6–15 March 2026.

== Competitors ==
The following is the list of number of competitors participating at the Games per sport/discipline.

Sport	Men	Women	Total
Para alpine skiing	1	0	1
Total	1	0	1

== Para alpine skiing ==
Athlete	Class	Event	Run 1		Run 2		Total	
Athlete	Class	Event	Time	Rank	Time	Rank	Time	Rank
Roger Puig Davi	LW9–2	Men's downhill, standing	—N/a				1:19.72	5
Roger Puig Davi	LW9–2	Men's super-G, standing	—N/a				1:15.11	11
Roger Puig Davi	LW9–2	Men's giant slalom, standing	1:12.25	16	1:11.50	15	2:23.75	15
Roger Puig Davi	LW9–2	Men's slalom, standing	DNF					
Roger Puig Davi	LW9–2	Men's super combined, standing	DNF					

== See also ==
- Andorra at the Paralympics
- Andorra at the 2026 Winter Olympics
