= Andorra at the 2010 Winter Paralympics =

- IPC code: AND
- NPC: Andorran Adapted Sports Federation

in Vancouver
- Competitors: 2 in 1 sport
- Flag bearer: Xabier Fernández
- Medals: Gold 0 Silver 0 Bronze 0 Total 0

Winter Paralympics appearances (overview)
- 2002; 2006; 2010; 2014; 2018; 2022; 2026

Andorra sent a delegation to compete at the 2010 Winter Paralympics, in Vancouver. It fielded two athletes, both in alpine skiing.

== Alpine skiing ==
The following two athletes represented Andorra in alpine skiing:

Athlete	Event	Final			
Athlete	Event	Run 1	Run 2	Total Time	Rank
Xavi Fernandez Vasquez	Men's slalom sitting	1:17.08	DNF		-
Xavi Fernandez Vasquez	Men's giant slalom sitting	1:48.61	1:51.55	3:40.16	24
Paquita Ramirez Capitan	Women's slalom visually impaired	1:21.06	1:27.81	2:48.87	11
Paquita Ramirez Capitan	Women's giant slalom visually impaired	2:06.63	2:10.33	4:26.96	9

== See also ==
- Andorra at the 2010 Winter Olympics
- Andorra at the Paralympics
