= Alpine skiing at the 2014 Winter Paralympics =

Alpine skiing at the XI Paralympic Winter Games
- Venue: Rosa Khutor Alpine Resort, Krasnaya Polyana, Russia
- Dates: 8–16 March

Alpine skiing at the 2014 Winter Paralympics was held at the Rosa Khutor Alpine Resort near Krasnaya Polyana, Russia. The thirty-two events occurred on 8–16 March 2014.

== Events ==
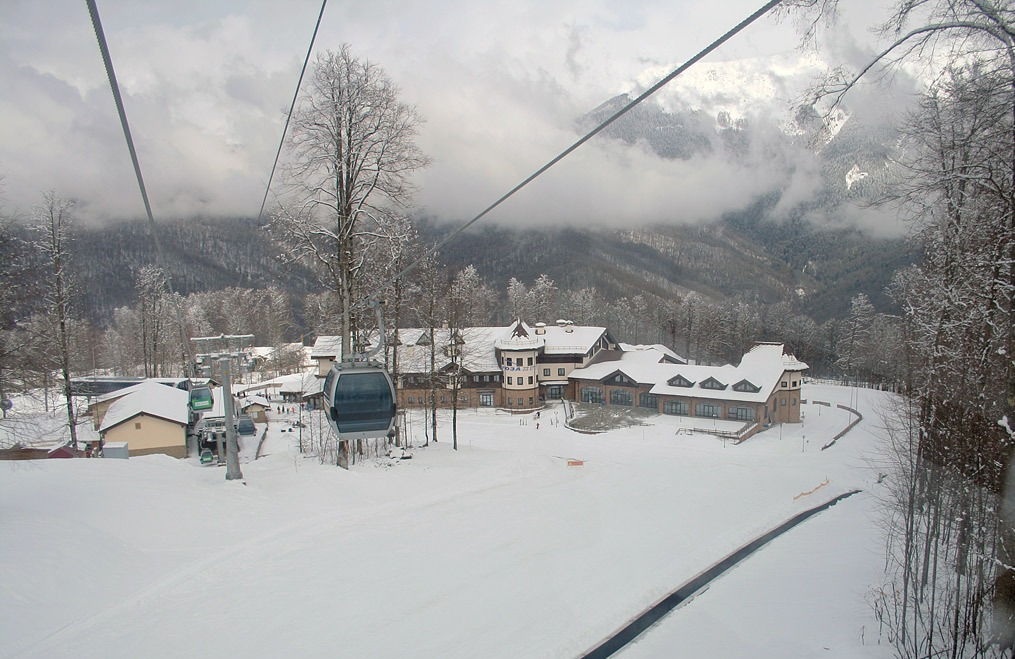
Rosa Khutor Alpine Resort, the venue for Alpine Skiing

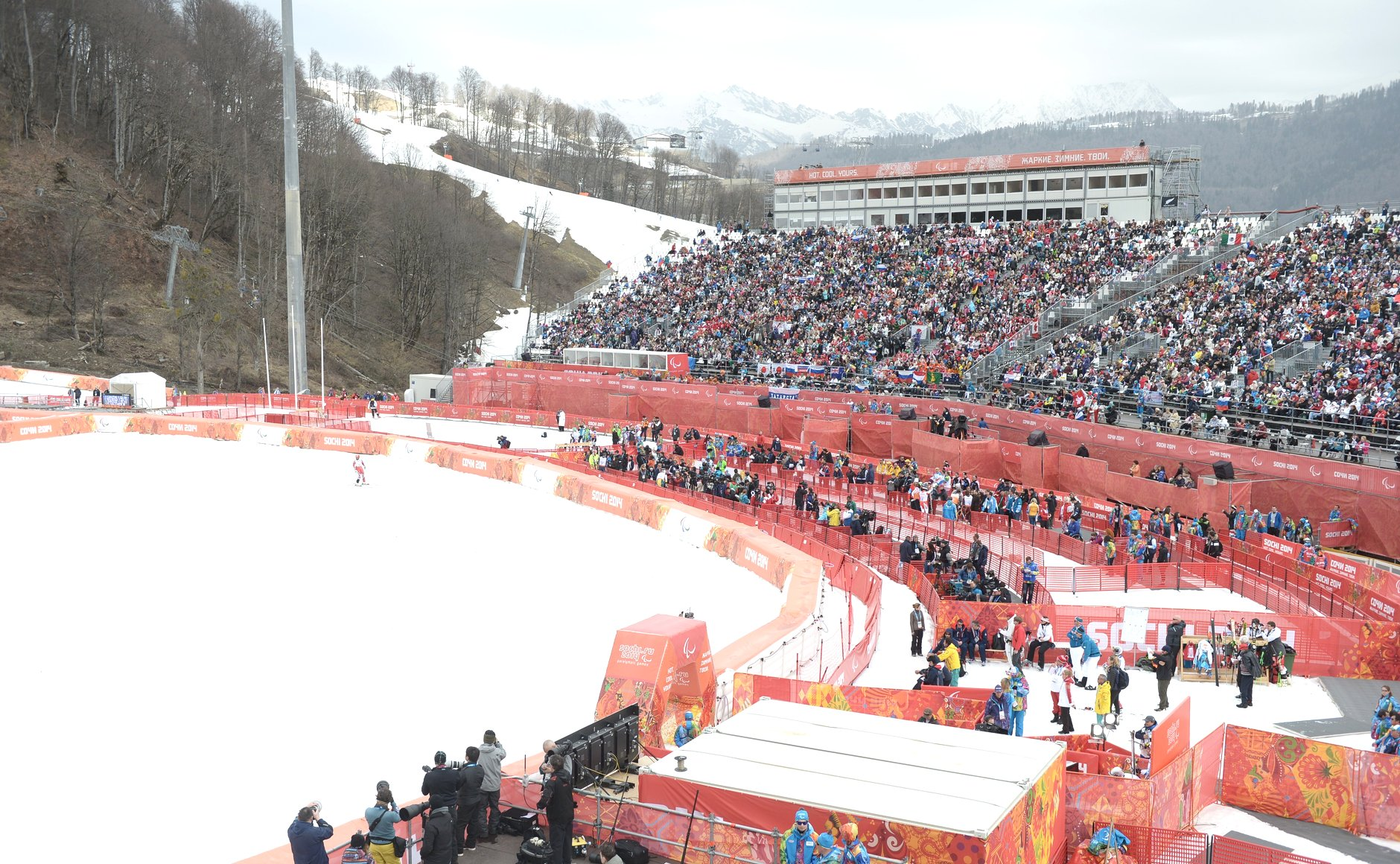
Finish area

Snowboarding made its Paralympic debut, with the addition of men's and women's standing snowboard cross events to the alpine skiing program.

The competition events are:

- Downhill (sitting, standing, visually impaired): women – men
- Super-G (sitting, standing, visually impaired): women – men
- Giant slalom (sitting, standing, visually impaired): women – men
- Slalom (sitting, standing, visually impaired): women – men
- Super combined (sitting, standing, visually impaired): women – men
- Snowboard cross (standing): women – men

== Competition schedule ==
The following is the competition schedule for all thirty-two events.

All times are (UTC+4).

Date	Time	Event
8 March	10:00	Women's downhill
8 March	10:50	Men's downhill
9 March	10:00	Men's Super-G
10 March	10:00	Women's Super-G
11 March	9:30	Women's super combined
11 March	10:25	Men's super combined
11 March	15:30	Women's super combined
11 March	16:10	Men's super combined
12 March	off	
13 March	16:00	Men's slalom
13 March	19:00	Men's slalom
14 March	10:00	Men's snowboard cross
14 March	10:00	Women's snowboard cross
14 March	16:00	Women's slalom
14 March	19:00	Women's slalom
15 March	9:30	Men's giant slalom
15 March	13:00	Men's giant slalom
16 March	9:30	Women's giant slalom
16 March	13:00	Women's giant slalom

== Medal summary ==
=== Medal table ===
* Host nation (Russia)

Rank	Nation	Gold	Silver	Bronze	Total
1	Russia (RUS)*	6	6	4	16
2	Germany (GER)	6	4	1	11
3	France (FRA)	5	3	2	10
4	Slovakia (SVK)	3	2	2	7
5	Japan (JPN)	3	1	1	5
6	Austria (AUT)	2	5	4	11
7	Canada (CAN)	2	1	5	8
8	United States (USA)	1	5	8	14
9	Great Britain (GBR)	1	3	1	5
10	Spain (ESP)	1	1	1	3
11	Netherlands (NED)	1	0	0	1
11	Switzerland (SUI)	1	0	0	1
13	New Zealand (NZL)	0	1	0	1
14	Australia (AUS)	0	0	2	2
Totals (14 entries)		32	32	31	95

=== Women's events ===
Event	Class	Gold		Silver		Bronze	
Downhill	visually impaired	Henrieta Farkašová; Guide: Natália Šubrtová; Slovakia	1:31.55	Jade Etherington; Guide: Caroline Powell; Great Britain	1:34.28	Aleksandra Frantceva; Guide: Pavel Zabotin; Russia	1:35.78
Downhill	sitting	Anna Schaffelhuber; Germany	1:35.55	Alana Nichols; United States	1:35.69	Laurie Stephens; United States	1:36.94
Downhill	standing	Marie Bochet; France	1:30.72	Inga Medvedeva; Russia	1:32.19	Allison Jones; United States	1:34.09
Super-G	visually impaired	Kelly Gallagher; Guide: Charlotte Evans; Great Britain	1:28.72	Aleksandra Frantceva; Guide: Pavel Zabotin; Russia	1:28.94	Jade Etherington; Guide: Caroline Powell; Great Britain	1:29.76
Super-G	sitting	Anna Schaffelhuber; Germany	1:29.11	Claudia Loesch; Austria	1:31.20	Laurie Stephens; United States	1:32.09
Super-G	standing	Marie Bochet; France	1:24.20	Solène Jambaqué; France	1:26.20	Stephanie Jallen; United States	1:30.14
Giant slalom	visually impaired	Henrieta Farkašová; Guide: Natália Šubrtová; Slovakia	2:48.63	Aleksandra Frantceva; Guide: Pavel Zabotin; Russia	2:54.91	Jessica Gallagher; Guide: Christian Geiger; Australia	3:02.11
Giant slalom	sitting	Anna Schaffelhuber; Germany	2:51.26	Claudia Loesch; Austria	2:55.91	Anna-Lena Forster; Germany	2:59.33
Giant slalom	standing	Marie Bochet; France	2:38.84	Andrea Rothfuss; Germany	2:39.70	Solène Jambaqué; France	2:46.81
Slalom	visually impaired	Aleksandra Frantceva; Guide: Pavel Zabotin; Russia	2:01.24	Jade Etherington; Guide: Caroline Powell; Great Britain	2:01.89	Henrieta Farkašová; Guide: Natália Šubrtová; Slovakia	2:02.94
Slalom	sitting	Anna Schaffelhuber; Germany	2:09.93	Anna-Lena Forster; Germany	2:14.35	Kimberly Joines; Canada	2:15.16
Slalom	standing	Andrea Rothfuss; Germany	1:59.85	Inga Medvedeva; Russia	2:06.70	Petra Smaržová; Slovakia	2:06.91
Super combined	visually impaired	Aleksandra Frantceva; Guide: Pavel Zabotin; Russia	2:27.75	Jade Etherington; Guide: Caroline Powell; Great Britain	2:28.38	Danelle Umstead; Guide: Robert Umstead; United States	2:42.09
Super combined	sitting	Anna Schaffelhuber; Germany	2:33.30	Anna-Lena Forster; Germany	2:38.96	Not awarded	
Super combined	standing	Marie Bochet; France	2:18.39	Andrea Rothfuss; Germany	2:22.74	Stephanie Jallen; United States	2:23.13
Snowboard cross	standing	Bibian Mentel-Spee; Netherlands	1:57.43	Cécile Hernandez-Cervellon; France	2:07.31	Amy Purdy; United States	2:14.29

=== Men's events ===
Event	Class	Gold		Silver		Bronze	
Downhill	visually impaired	Jon Santacana Maiztegui; Guide: Miguel Galindo Garces; Spain	1:21.76	Miroslav Haraus; Guide: Maros Hudik; Slovakia	1:22.01	Mac Marcoux; Guide: Robin Femy; Canada	1:23.02
Downhill	sitting	Akira Kano; Japan	1:23.80	Josh Dueck; Canada	1:24.19	Takeshi Suzuki; Japan	1:24.75
Downhill	standing	Markus Salcher; Austria	1:24.35	Alexey Bugaev; Russia	1:24.41	Vincent Gauthier-Manuel; France	1:25.30
Super-G	visually impaired	Jakub Krako; Guide: Martin Motyka; Slovakia	1:20.58	Mark Bathum; Guide: Cade Yamamoto; United States	1:20.71	Mac Marcoux; Guide: Robin Femy; Canada	1:20.77
Super-G	sitting	Akira Kano; Japan	1:19.51	Taiki Morii; Japan	1:21.60	Caleb Brousseau; Canada	1:22.05
Super-G	standing	Markus Salcher; Austria	1:20.92	Matthias Lanzinger; Austria	1:21.33	Alexey Bugaev; Russia	1:22.30
Giant slalom	visually impaired	Mac Marcoux; Guide: Robin Femy; Canada	2:29.62	Jakub Krako; Guide: Martin Motyka; Slovakia	2:31.66	Valerii Redkozubov; Guide:Evgeni Geroev; Russia	2:33.57
Giant slalom	sitting	Christoph Kunz; Switzerland	2:32.73	Corey Peters; New Zealand	2:33.20	Roman Rabl; Austria	2:33.31
Giant slalom	standing	Vincent Gauthier-Manuel; France	2:25.87	Alexey Bugaev; Russia	2:27.87	Markus Salcher; Austria	2:28.14
Slalom	visually impaired	Valerii Redkozubov; Guide:Evgeni Geroev; Russia	1:43.21	Yon Santacana Maiztegui; Guide:Miguel Galindo Garces; Spain	1:46.82	Chris Williamson; Guide:Nick Brush; Canada	1:48.61
Slalom	sitting	Takeshi Suzuki; Japan	1:53.78	Philipp Bonadimann; Austria	1:56.46	Roman Rabl; Austria	1:56.64
Slalom	standing	Alexey Bugaev; Russia	1:38.97	Vincent Gauthier-Manuel; France	1:40.24	Alexander Alyabyev; Russia	1:40.74
Super combined	visually impaired	Valerii Redkozubov; Guide:Evgeni Geroev; Russia	2:15.87	Mark Bathum; Guide:Cade Yamamoto; United States	2:17.38	Gabriel Juan Gorce Yepes; Guide:Josep Arnau Ferrer Ventura; Spain	2:20.36
Super combined	sitting	Josh Dueck; Canada	2:18.20	Heath Calhoun; United States	2:19.09	Roman Rabl; Austria	2:20.20
Super combined	standing	Alexey Bugaev; Russia	2:09.72	Matthias Lanzinger; Austria	2:10.82	Toby Kane; Australia	2:14.14
Snowboard cross	standing	Evan Strong; United States	1:43.61	Michael Shea; United States	1:44.18	Keith Gabel; United States	1:47.10

== See also ==
- Alpine skiing at the 2014 Winter Olympics
