= Andorra at the 2006 Winter Paralympics =

- IPC code: AND
- NPC: Andorran Adapted Sports Federation

in Turin
- Competitors: 2 in 1 sport
- Medals Ranked 20th: Gold 0 Silver 0 Bronze 0 Total 0

Winter Paralympics appearances (overview)
- 2002; 2006; 2010; 2014; 2018; 2022; 2026

Andorra participated in the ninth Winter Paralympics in Turin, Italy.

Andorra entered two athletes, Xavier Barios and Francesca Ramirez, both in alpine skiing. Neither won a medal.

== Medalists ==
	(gold)	(silver)	(bronze)	Total
Andorra	0	0	0	0

== See also ==
- 2006 Winter Paralympics
- Andorra at the 2006 Winter Olympics
