= Alexey Bugaev =

Russian Para alpine skier

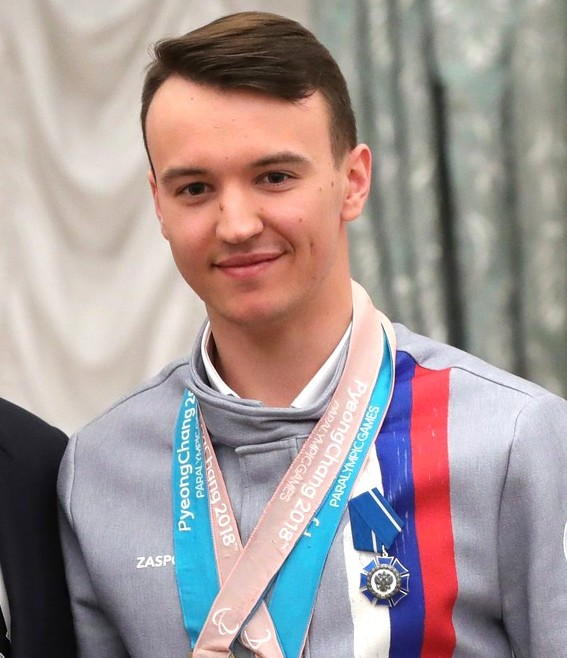
- Bugaev in 2018

Personal information
- Born: 30 March 1997 (age 29) Krasnoyarsk, Russia
- Height: 1.75 m (5 ft 9 in)

Sport
- Country: Russia
- Sport: Para alpine skiing
- Disability class: LW6/8-2
Medal record
Men's Para alpine skiing
Representing Russia
Paralympic Games
Gold medal – first place	2014 Sochi	Super-combined
Gold medal – first place	2014 Sochi	Slalom
Gold medal – first place	2026 Milano Cortina	Slalom
Silver medal – second place	2014 Sochi	Giant slalom
Silver medal – second place	2014 Sochi	Downhill
Bronze medal – third place	2014 Sochi	Super-G
Bronze medal – third place	2026 Milano Cortina	Downhill
Bronze medal – third place	2026 Milano Cortina	Giant slalom
World Para Alpine Skiing Championships
Gold medal – first place	2015 Panorama	Downhill
Gold medal – first place	2015 Panorama	Super combined
Gold medal – first place	2015 Panorama	Super-G
Gold medal – first place	2015 Panorama	Giant slalom
Gold medal – first place	2015 Panorama	Slalom
Silver medal – second place	2013 La Molina	Giant slalom
Silver medal – second place	2013 La Molina	Super combined
Representing Neutral Paralympic Athletes
Paralympic Games
Gold medal – first place	2018 Pyeongchang	Super-combined
Silver medal – second place	2018 Pyeongchang	Giant slalom
Representing RPC
World Para Alpine Skiing Championships
Gold medal – first place	2021 Lillehammer	Giant slalom
Silver medal – second place	2021 Lillehammer	Super-G
Silver medal – second place	2021 Lillehammer	Super combined
Bronze medal – third place	2021 Lillehammer	Downhill
Bronze medal – third place	2021 Lillehammer	Parallel event

Alexey Sergeyevich Bugaev (Russian: Алексей Сергеевич Бугаев, also transliterated Aleksei; born 30 March 1997) is a Russian Para alpine skier who competed at the 2014 Winter Paralympics, winning five medals. He won the International Sports Prize World Athlete of the Year award in 2018.

== Early life ==
Bugaev was born in Krasnoyarsk, Russia. He was born missing four fingers and the top of his thumb on his right hand. he took up skiing after his parents took him to a ski resort to help him integrate better into society.

== Career ==
Bugaev competes in the LW6/8 para-alpine skiing classification, for athletes with an impairment in one arm, using two skis and a single ski pole.

At the 2013 IPC Alpine Skiing World Championships held in La Molina, Spain, he broke his arm whilst finishing 5th in the slalom. Competing with his arm in plaster he won silver medals in the standing super combined and giant slalom events. He also placed 6th in the super-G and 11th in the downhill.

He was selected to compete at the 2014 Winter Paralympics held in Sochi, Russia. In his first event, the standing downhill, he won a silver medal behind Markus Salcher of Austria. He won a second medal a day later, taking the bronze in the standing super-G as Salcher again won the gold medal. Bugaev won his first Paralympic gold medal in his third event of the Games, the standing slalom. He led the field after the first run and extended his lead on the second to take the gold medal in a combined time of 1 minute 38.97 seconds, 1.27 seconds of second placed Vincent Gauthier-Manuel. He won a second gold medal in the super-combined; he completed the course in 50.30 seconds to lead the field after the slalom portio of the competition and eventually won the event by 1.10 seconds over Matthias Lanzinger following the super-G portion. Bugaev won his second silver medal, and fifth medal overall, in the giant slalom, finishing 1.43 seconds behind gold medalist Gauthier-Manuel on the first run and 0.57 seconds behind him on the second run.

== Awards and decorations ==
- Order "For Merit to the Fatherland", 4th class (17 March 2014) – for the huge contribution to the development of physical culture and sports, and for the high athletic performances at the 2014 Paralympic Winter Games in Sochi
- Merited Master of Sports of Russia (11 March 2014)
- "Disabled Male Athlete of the Year" in the nomination "Overcoming" by the Ministry of Sport of Russia
- International Sports Prize World Athlete of the Year (2018)
