= Andorra at the 2014 Winter Paralympics =

- IPC code: AND
- NPC: Andorran Adapted Sports Federation

in Sochi
- Competitors: 1 in 1 sport
- Medals: Gold 0 Silver 0 Bronze 0 Total 0

Winter Paralympics appearances (overview)
- 2002; 2006; 2010; 2014; 2018; 2022; 2026

Andorra sent a delegation to compete at the 2014 Winter Paralympics in Sochi, Russia, held between 7–16 March 2014. This marked the nation's fourth participation in a Winter Paralympics The delegation consisted of a single athlete, alpine skier Xavier Fernandez, who failed to post a finishing time in either of the two events he competed in.

== Background ==
Andorra has participated in every Winter Paralympics since the 2002 edition. They have only participated in the Summer Paralympics once, in 2012. They had never won a medal at any Paralympics Games before the Sochi edition. Alpine skiing is the only sport Andorra had ever competed at in a Winter Paralympics. Xavier Fernandez was chosen as the Andorran flag-bearer for the parade of nations during the opening ceremony, and for the closing ceremony.

== Disability classification ==
Every participant at the Paralympics has their disability grouped into one of five disability categories; amputation, the condition may be congenital or sustained through injury or illness; cerebral palsy; wheelchair athletes, there is often overlap between this and other categories; visual impairment, including blindness; or Les autres. Les autres includes+ any physical disability that does not fall strictly under one of the other categories, for example dwarfism or multiple sclerosis. Each Paralympic sport then has its own classifications, dependent upon the specific physical demands of competition. Events are given a code, made of numbers and letters, describing the type of event and classification of the athletes competing. Events with "B" in the code are for athletes with visual impairment, codes LW1 to LW9 are for athletes who stand to compete and LW10 to LW12 are for athletes who compete sitting down. Alpine skiing events grouped athletes into separate competitions for sitting, standing and visually impaired athletes.

== Alpine skiing ==
Xavier Fernandez was 41 at the time of the Sochi Paralympics. He is classified LW10-1, and competes in a sitting position. On 13 March 2014, he was one of 41 athletes who competed in the slalom event, however, he was unable to finish the race due to a fall. Two days later, there were 45 competitors entered in the giant slalom event. Fernandez was disqualified during the first run for unspecified reasons.

Athlete	Event	Run 1			Run 2			Final/Total		
Athlete	Event	Time	Diff	Rank	Time	Diff	Rank	Time	Diff	Rank
Xavier Fernandez	Slalom, sitting	DNF								
Xavier Fernandez	Giant slalom, sitting	DSQ								

== See also ==
- Andorra at the Paralympics
- Andorra at the 2014 Winter Olympics
