= Andorra at the 2022 Winter Paralympics =

- Flag of Andorra
- IPC code: AND
- NPC: Andorran Adapted Sports Federation

in Beijing, China 4 March 2022 – 13 March 2022
- Competitors: 1 in 1 sport
- Flag bearer: Games Volunteer
- Medals: Gold 0 Silver 0 Bronze 0 Total 0

Winter Paralympics appearances (overview)
- 2002; 2006; 2010; 2014; 2018; 2022; 2026

Andorra competed at the 2022 Winter Paralympics in Beijing, China which took place between 4–13 March 2022.

== Competitors ==
The following is the list of number of competitors participating at the Games per sport/discipline.

Sport	Men	Women	Total
Alpine skiing	1	0	1
Total	1	0	1

== Alpine skiing ==
Andorra sent one alpine skier to compete in the Games.

Athlete	Event	Run 1		Run 2		Total	
Athlete	Event	Time	Rank	Time	Rank	Time	Rank
Roger Puig	Men's super combined, standing	1:14.07	9	57.12	23	2:11.19	23
Roger Puig	Men's downhill, standing	—N/a				1:25.17	29
Roger Puig	Men's giant slalom, standing	1:03.88	18	1:01.73	17	2:05.61	17
Roger Puig	Men's slalom, standing	48.12	16	Did not finish			
Roger Puig	Men's super-G, standing	—N/a				Did not finish	

== See also ==
- Andorra at the Paralympics
- Andorra at the 2022 Winter Olympics
