= Argentina at the 2026 Winter Paralympics =

- Flag of Argentina
- IPC code: ARG
- NPC: Argentine Paralympic Committee
- Website: www.dbs-npc.de

in Milan & Cortina d'Ampezzo, Italy 6 March 2026 – 15 March 2026
- Competitors: 3 (3 men) in 3 sports
- Flag bearer (opening): Enrique Plantey
- Flag bearer (closing): Nicolás Lima
- Medals: Gold 0 Silver 0 Bronze 0 Total 0

Winter Paralympics appearances (overview)
- 2010; 2014; 2018; 2022; 2026

Argentina was represented at the 2026 Winter Paralympics in Milan & Cortina d'Ampezzo, Italy, which took place between 6–15 March 2026.

== Competitors ==
The following is the list of number of competitors participating at the Games per sport/discipline.

Sport	Men	Women	Total
Para alpine skiing	1	0	1
Para biathlon	2	0	2
Para cross-country skiing	2	0	2
Total	3	0	3

== Para alpine skiing ==
Athlete	Class	Event	Run 1		Run 2		Total	
Athlete	Class	Event	Time	Rank	Time	Rank	Time	Rank
Enrique Plantey	LW11	Downhill, sitting	—N/a				DNF	
Enrique Plantey	LW11	Super-G, sitting	—N/a				DNF	
Enrique Plantey	LW11	Giant slalom, sitting	DNF					
Enrique Plantey	LW11	Slalom, sitting	DNF					
Enrique Plantey	LW11	Super combined, sitting	1:20.73	12	50.52	13	2:11.25	13

== Para biathlon ==
Athlete	Class	Event	Qualification			Final		
Athlete	Class	Event	Missed shots	Time	Rank	Missed shots	Time	Rank
Omar Lorenzo	LW11	Individual, sitting	—N/a			14 (1+5+4+4)	59:56.0	27
Omar Lorenzo	LW11	Sprint, sitting	—N/a			6 (1+5)	29:29.7	27
Omar Lorenzo	LW11	Sprint pursuit, sitting	5 (2+3)	12:46.0	26	Did not advance		

== Para cross-country skiing ==
Men

Athlete	Class	Event	Qualification		Semifinal		Final	
Athlete	Class	Event	Time	Rank	Time	Rank	Time	Rank
Nicolás Lima	LW11.5	Sprint, sitting	2:34.89	30	Did not advance			
Nicolás Lima	LW11.5	10 km, sitting	—N/a				29:04.3	24
Nicolás Lima	LW11.5	20 km, sitting	—N/a				1:02:33.3	24
Omar Lorenzo	LW11	Sprint, sitting	2:52.93	35	Did not advance			
Omar Lorenzo	LW11	10 km, sitting	—N/a				32:17.2	28
Omar Lorenzo	LW11	20 km, sitting	—N/a				1:06:52.0	28

== See also ==
- Argentina at the Paralympics
- Argentina at the 2026 Winter Olympics
