= Argentina at the 2014 Winter Paralympics =

- IPC code: ARG
- NPC: Argentine Paralympic Committee
- Website: www.coparg.org.ar

in Sochi
- Competitors: 3 in 2 sports
- Medals: Gold 0 Silver 0 Bronze 0 Total 0

Winter Paralympics appearances (overview)
- 2010; 2014; 2018; 2022; 2026

Argentina competed at the 2014 Winter Paralympics in Sochi, Russia, held between 7–16 March 2014.

== Alpine skiing ==
Men

Athlete	Event	Run 1			Run 2			Final/Total		
Athlete	Event	Time	Diff	Rank	Time	Diff	Rank	Time	Diff	Rank
Carlos Javier Codina Thomatis	Slalom, standing	1:02.87	+15.18	33	1:07.07	+15.79	24	2:09.94	+30.97	26
Carlos Javier Codina Thomatis	Giant slalom, standing	1:33.96	+19.24	32	1:24.40	+13.25	24	2:58.36	+32.49	25
Enrique Plantey	Giant slalom, sitting	1:34.37	+16.27	25	1:31.28	+17.18	19	3:05.65	+32.92	19

=== Snowboarding ===
Para-snowboarding is making its debut at the Winter Paralympics and it will be placed under the Alpine skiing program during the 2014 Games.

Men

Athlete	Event	Race 1		Race 2		Race 3		Total	
Athlete	Event	Time	Rank	Time	Rank	Time	Rank	Time	Rank
Carlos Javier Codina Thomatis	Snowboard cross	58.01	9	56.99	8	56.57	6	1:53.56	9

== Cross-country skiing ==
Men

Athlete	Event	Qualification			Semifinal		Final		
Athlete	Event	Real Time	Result	Rank	Result	Rank	Real Time	Result	Rank
Pablo Javier Robledo	1km sprint classic, standing	4:20.61	4:12.79	20	did not qualify				
Pablo Javier Robledo	10km free, standing	—N/a					28:17.2	27:26.3	23
Pablo Javier Robledo	20km, standing	—N/a					1:05:24.2	1:02:47.2	12

== See also ==
- Argentina at the Paralympics
- Argentina at the 2014 Winter Olympics
