= Andorra at the 2018 Winter Paralympics =

- IPC code: AND
- NPC: Andorran Adapted Sports Federation

in Pyeongchang
- Competitors: 1 in 1 sport
- Medals: Gold 0 Silver 0 Bronze 0 Total 0

Winter Paralympics appearances (overview)
- 2002; 2006; 2010; 2014; 2018; 2022; 2026

Andorra sent competitors to the 2018 Winter Paralympics in Pyeongchang, South Korea. They competed in para-alpine skiing. The country first went to the Winter Paralympics in 2002. When they arrived in Pyeongchang, they competed in their fifth Winter Paralympics.

== Team ==
The International Paralympic Committee confirmed that Andorra would compete at the 2018 Winter Paralympics.

The table below contains the list of members of people (called "Team Andorra") that participated in the 2018 Games.

Team Andorra
Name	Sport	Gender	Classification	Events	ref
Roger Puig	para-alpine skiing	male	LW9.2		

== History ==
The country first went to the Winter Paralympics in 2002. When they arrived in Pyeongchang, they competed in their fifth Winter Paralympics. Their best finish at the Winter Games was in 2010, when Paquita Ramirez Capitan was ninth in the women's Giant Slalom.
