= Argentina at the 2022 Winter Paralympics =

- Flag of Argentina
- IPC code: ARG
- NPC: Argentine Paralympic Committee
- Website: www.coparg.org.ar

in Beijing, China 4 March 2022 – 13 March 2022
- Competitors: 2 in 2 sports
- Flag bearers: Enrique Plantey (opening); TBD (closing)
- Medals: Gold 0 Silver 0 Bronze 0 Total 0

Winter Paralympics appearances (overview)
- 2010; 2014; 2018; 2022; 2026

Argentina competed at the 2022 Winter Paralympics in Beijing, China which took place between 4–13 March 2022.

== Competitors ==
The following is the list of number of competitors participating at the Games per sport/discipline.

Sport	Men	Women	Total
Alpine skiing	1	0	1
Cross-country skiing	1	0	1
Total	2	0	2

== Alpine skiing ==
Enrique Plantey competed in the mono-skiing.

Athlete	Event	Run 1		Run 2		Total	
Athlete	Event	Time	Rank	Time	Rank	Time	Rank
Enrique Plantey	Men's super combined, sitting	did not finish					
Enrique Plantey	Men's downhill, sitting	—N/a				did not finish	
Enrique Plantey	Men's giant slalom, sitting	1:02.13	5	1:01.01	6	2:03.14	4
Enrique Plantey	Men's slalom, sitting	56.65	23	57.61	9	1:54.26	11
Enrique Plantey	Men's super-G, sitting	—N/a				1:15.89	8

== Cross-country skiing ==
Argentina sent one athlete to compete in cross-country skiing.

Men's distance

Athlete	Event	Final	
Athlete	Event	Time	Rank
Nicolás Lima	10 km free sitting	39:14.1	29
Nicolás Lima	18 km classical sitting	54:20.8	17

Sprint

Athlete	Event	Qualification		Semifinal		Final	
Athlete	Event	Time	Rank	Time	Rank	Time	Rank
Nicolás Lima	1.5 km sprint sitting	2:47.78	27	did not advance			

== See also ==
- Argentina at the Paralympics
- Argentina at the 2022 Winter Olympics
