= Andorra at the 2002 Winter Paralympics =

- Flag of Andorra
- IPC code: AND
- NPC: Andorran Adapted Sports Federation

in Salt Lake City, United States 7-16 March 2002
- Competitors: 2 (2 men and 0 women) in 1 sport
- Medals: Gold 0 Silver 0 Bronze 0 Total 0

Winter Paralympics appearances (overview)
- 2002; 2006; 2010; 2014; 2018; 2022; 2026

Andorra participated in the 2002 Winter Paralympic Games in Salt Lake City, United States from 7 to 16 March 2002. It was the country's first participation in the Paralympic Games.

== Competitors ==
The following is the list of number of competitors who participated at the Games per sport/discipline.

Sport	Men	Women	Total
Alpine skiing	2	0	2
Total	2	0	2

== Alpine Skiing ==
Andorra qualified two skiers in both the men's giant slalom and the men's slalom LW10 class.

Athlete	Event	Final	
Athlete	Event	Time	Rank
Xavier Barios	Men's giant slalom LW10	DNF	
Xavier Barios	Men's slalom, LW10	DNF	
Miguel Llongueras	Men's giant slalom LW10	DNF	
Miguel Llongueras	Men's slalom, LW10	DNF	

== See also ==
- Andorra at the Paralympics
- Andorra at the 2002 Winter Olympics
