= Greece at the 2018 Winter Paralympics =

- The flag of Greece
- IPC code: GRE
- NPC: Hellenic Paralympic Committee
- Website: www.paralympic.gr

in Pyeongchang
- Competitors: 1 in 1 sport
- Medals: Gold 0 Silver 0 Bronze 0 Total 0

Winter Paralympics appearances (overview)
- 2002; 2006; 2010; 2014; 2018; 2022; 2026

Greece sent competitors to the 2018 Winter Paralympics in Pyeongchang, South Korea. One person represented Greece with snowboarder Konstantinos Petrakis. It is the first time a snowboarder has represented Greece at the Winter Paralympics. Greece first went to the Winter Paralympics in 2002. The 2018 Games are the fifth time they sent a team to the Winter Paralympics.

== Team ==
Greece is going to have a team that includes one snowboarder, Konstantinos Petrakis. It is the first time a snowboarder has represented Greece at the Winter Paralympics.

The table below contains the list of members of people (called "Team Greece") that will be participating in the 2018 Games.

Team Greece
Name	Sport	Gender	Classification	Events	ref
Konstantinos Petrakis	para-snowboarding	male	SB-UL	snowboard cross	

== History ==
Greece first went to the Winter Paralympics in 2002. The 2018 Games are the fifth time they sent a team to the Winter Paralympics.

== Para-snowboarding ==
=== Snowboarders ===
Konstantinos Petrakis is from Veria. Petrakis is only racing in the snowboard cross. He has won five medals in his career in the event.

=== Schedule and results ===
The snowboard cross event starts on 12 March. It goes from 10:30 AM to 5:00 PM for all classes for both men and women.
