= Greece at the 2022 Winter Paralympics =

- Flag of Greece
- IPC code: GRE
- NPC: Hellenic Paralympic Committee
- Website: www.paralympic.gr

in Beijing, China 4 March 2022 – 13 March 2022
- Competitors: 2 (1 man and 1 woman) in 2 sports
- Flag bearers: Evangelia Nikou; Konstantinos Petrakis
- Medals: Gold 0 Silver 0 Bronze 0 Total 0

Winter Paralympics appearances (overview)
- 2002; 2006; 2010; 2014; 2018; 2022; 2026

Greece competed at the 2022 Winter Paralympics in Beijing, China which took place between 4–13 March 2022.

== Competitors ==
The following is the list of number of competitors participating at the Games per sport/discipline.

Sport	Men	Women	Total
Alpine skiing	0	1	1
Snowboarding	1	0	1
Total	1	1	2

== Alpine skiing ==
Evangelia Nikou competed in alpine skiing.

Athlete	Event	Run 1		Run 2		Total	
Athlete	Event	Time	Rank	Time	Rank	Time	Rank
Eva Nikou; Guide: Dimitrios Profentzas	Women's super combined, visually impaired	1:26.46	7	DNF			
Eva Nikou; Guide: Dimitrios Profentzas	Women's super-G, visually impaired	—N/a				1:25.25	6

== Snowboarding ==
Konstantinos Petrakis competed in snowboarding. He also represented Greece at the 2018 Winter Paralympics held in Pyeongchang, South Korea.

Banked slalom

Athlete	Event	Run 1	Run 2	Best	Rank
Konstantinos Petrakis	Men's SB-UL	1:21.27	1:20.79	1:20.79	16

Snowboard cross

Athlete	Event	Qualification			Quarterfinal	Semifinal	Final
Athlete	Event	Run 1	Run 2	Rank	Position	Position	Position
Konstantinos Petrakis	Men's SB-UL	1:11.03	1:12.13	15 Q	4	Did not advance	

== See also ==
- Greece at the Paralympics
- Greece at the 2022 Winter Olympics
