= Greece at the 2010 Winter Paralympics =

- IPC code: GRE
- NPC: Hellenic Paralympic Committee
- Website: www.paralympic.gr

in Vancouver
- Competitors: 2 in 1 sport
- Flag bearer: Vivi Christodoulopoulou
- Medals: Gold 0 Silver 0 Bronze 0 Total 0

Winter Paralympics appearances (overview)
- 2002; 2006; 2010; 2014; 2018; 2022; 2026

Greece sent a delegation to compete at the 2010 Winter Paralympics, in Vancouver. It fielded a total of two athletes (one man and one woman), both in alpine skiing.

== Alpine skiing ==
Two athletes represented Greece in alpine skiing:

Women

Athlete	Event	Run 1 (SG)			Run 2 (Sl)			Final/Total		
Athlete	Event	Time	Diff	Rank	Time	Diff	Rank	Time	Diff	Rank
Paraskevi Christodoulopoulo	Giant slalom, standing	2:32.76		17	2:19.78		16	4:52.54	+2:18.51	16

Men

Athlete	Event	Run 1 (SG)			Run 2 (Sl)			Final/Total		
Athlete	Event	Time	Diff	Rank	Time	Diff	Rank	Time	Diff	Rank
Ioannis Papavasileiou	Slalom, standing	1:30.83		42	1:39.15		40	3:09.98	+1:24.58	40
Ioannis Papavasileiou	Giant slalom, standing	2:03.38		40				4:10.19		40

== See also ==
- Greece at the 2010 Winter Olympics
- Greece at the Paralympics
