= Greece at the 2026 Winter Paralympics =

- Flag of Greece
- IPC code: GRE
- NPC: Hellenic Paralympic Committee

in Milan & Cortina d'Ampezzo, Italy 6 March 2026 – 15 March 2026
- Competitors: 2 (1 man and 1 woman) in 2 sports
- Medals: Gold 0 Silver 0 Bronze 0 Total 0

Winter Paralympics appearances (overview)
- 2002; 2006; 2010; 2014; 2018; 2022; 2026

Greece will compete at the 2026 Winter Paralympics in Milan & Cortina d'Ampezzo, Italy, which will take place between 6–15 March 2026.

== Competitors ==
The following is the list of number of competitors participating at the Games per sport/discipline.

Sport	Men	Women	Total
Para alpine skiing	0	1	1
Para snowboard	1	0	1
Total	1	1	2

== Para alpine skiing ==
Athlete	Class	Event	Run 1		Run 2		Total	
Athlete	Class	Event	Time	Rank	Time	Rank	Time	Rank
Eva Nikou; Guide: Dimitris Profentzas	AS3	Women's downhill, visually impaired	—N/a				1:36.07	7
Eva Nikou; Guide: Dimitris Profentzas	AS3	Women's super-G, visually impaired	—N/a				1:25.99	7
Eva Nikou; Guide: Dimitris Profentzas	AS3	Women's giant slalom, visually impaired	1:18.94	8	1:22.56	8	2:41.50	8
Eva Nikou; Guide: Dimitris Profentzas	AS3	Women's slalom, visually impaired	49.32	8	48.48	7	1:37.80	8
Eva Nikou; Guide: Dimitris Profentzas	AS3	Women's super combined, visually impaired	1:27.48	8	52.00	9	2:19.48	8

== Para snowboard ==
Banked slalom

Athlete	Event	Run 1	Run 2	Best	Rank
Konstantinos Petrakis	Men's banked slalom, SB-UL	1:06.72	1:05.30	1:05.30	17

Snowboard cross

Athlete	Event	Seeding		1/8 final	Quarterfinal	Semifinal	Final	
Athlete	Event	Time	Rank	Position	Position	Position	Position	Rank
Konstantinos Petrakis	Men's snowboard cross, SB-UL	1:01.94	19	3	Did not advance			

== See also ==
- Greece at the Paralympics
- Greece at the 2026 Winter Olympics
