= Greece at the 2006 Winter Paralympics =

- IPC code: GRE
- NPC: Hellenic Paralympic Committee
- Website: www.paralympic.gr

in Turin
- Competitors: 1 in 1 sport
- Medals Ranked 20th: Gold 0 Silver 0 Bronze 0 Total 0

Winter Paralympics appearances (overview)
- 2002; 2006; 2010; 2014; 2018; 2022; 2026

Greece participated in the ninth Winter Paralympics in Turin, Italy.

Greece entered one athlete in the following sport:

- Alpine skiing: 1 male

== Medalists ==
	(gold)	(silver)	(bronze)	Total
Greece	0	0	0	0

== See also ==
- 2006 Winter Paralympics
- Greece at the 2006 Winter Olympics
