= Greece at the 2002 Winter Paralympics =

- IPC code: GRE
- NPC: Hellenic Paralympic Committee
- Website: www.paralympic.gr

in Salt Lake City
- Competitors: 1
- Medals: Gold 0 Silver 0 Bronze 0 Total 0

Winter Paralympics appearances (overview)
- 2002; 2006; 2010; 2014; 2018; 2022; 2026

Greece competed at the 2002 Winter Paralympics in Salt Lake City, United States. 1 competitor from Greece won no medals and so did not place in the medal table.

== See also ==
- Greece at the Paralympics
- Greece at the 2002 Winter Olympics
