= Argentina at the 2010 Winter Paralympics =

- IPC code: ARG
- NPC: Argentine Paralympic Committee
- Website: www.coparg.org.ar

in Vancouver
- Competitors: 2 in 1 sport
- Flag bearer: Juan Ignacio Maggi
- Medals: Gold 0 Silver 0 Bronze 0 Total 0

Winter Paralympics appearances (overview)
- 2010; 2014; 2018; 2022; 2026

Argentina sent a delegation to compete at the 2010 Winter Paralympics, in Vancouver. It fielded a total of two athletes, both in alpine skiing.

Although Argentina has been competing at the Summer Paralympics since their inception in 1960, this was the country's first ever participation in the Winter Paralympic Games.

== Alpine skiing ==
The following two athletes represented Argentina in alpine skiing:

Athlete	Event	Final			
Athlete	Event	Run 1	Run 2	Total Time	Rank
Juan Ignacio Maggi	Men's giant slalom sitting	4:04.38	DNF		-
Leonardo Martinez	Men's giant slalom sitting	1:51.49	1:51.12	3:42.61	25

== See also ==
- Argentina at the 2010 Winter Olympics
- Argentina at the Paralympics
