= Switzerland at the 2014 Winter Paralympics =

- IPC code: SUI
- NPC: Swiss Paralympic Committee
- Website: www.swissparalympic.ch

in Sochi
- Competitors: 8 in 1 sport
- Flag bearers: Christoph Kunz (opening); Michael Bruegger (closing)
- Medals Ranked 14th: Gold 1 Silver 0 Bronze 0 Total 1

Winter Paralympics appearances (overview)
- 1976; 1980; 1984; 1988; 1992; 1994; 1998; 2002; 2006; 2010; 2014; 2018; 2022; 2026

Switzerland competed at the 2014 Winter Paralympics in Sochi, Russia, held between 7–16 March 2014.

== Medalists ==
Medal	Name	Sport	Event	Date
Gold	Christoph Kunz	Alpine skiing	Giant slalom, sitting	15 March

== Alpine skiing ==
Men

Athlete	Event	Run 1			Run 2			Final/Total		
Athlete	Event	Time	Diff	Rank	Time	Diff	Rank	Time	Diff	Rank
Christophe Brodard	Super-G, standing	—N/a						DNS		
Christophe Brodard	Combined, standing	DNF								
Christophe Brodard	Slalom, standing	56.79	+9.10	24	DNF					
Christophe Brodard	Giant slalom, standing	1:24.61	+9.89	19	1:21.53	+10.38	18	2:46.14	+20.27	18
Michael Bruegger	Downhill, standing	—N/a						1:26.08	+1.73	5
Michael Bruegger	Super-G, standing	—N/a						1:24.11	+3.19	5
Michael Bruegger	Combined, standing	57.56	+7.26	16	DNS					
Michael Bruegger	Slalom, standing	54.35	+6.66	18	DNF					
Michael Bruegger	Giant slalom, standing	1:18.96	+4.24	7	DNF					
Robin Cuche	Slalom, standing	57.41	+9.72	25	1:00.28	+9.00	17	1:57.69	+18.72	18
Robin Cuche	Giant slalom, standing	1:23.31	+8.59	17	1:17.26	+6.11	12	2:40.57	+14.70	12
Christoph Kunz	Downhill, sitting	—N/a						1:27.10	+3.30	9
Christoph Kunz	Super-G, sitting	—N/a						DNF		
Christoph Kunz	Combined, sitting	DNF								
Christoph Kunz	Slalom, sitting	DNS								
Christoph Kunz	Giant slalom, sitting	1:18.63	+0.53	2	1:14.10	-	1	2:32.73	-	1st place, gold medalist(s)
Maurizio Nicoli	Super-G, sitting	—N/a						1:31.78	+12.27	12
Maurizio Nicoli	Combined, sitting	DNS								
Maurizio Nicoli	Slalom, sitting	DNF								
Maurizio Nicoli	Giant slalom, sitting	1:29.91	+11.81	23	DNF					
Thomas Pfyl	Downhill, standing	—N/a						1:28.31	+3.96	10
Thomas Pfyl	Super-G, standing	—N/a						1:28.86	+7.94	15
Thomas Pfyl	Combined, standing	56.92	+6.62	13	DNS					
Thomas Pfyl	Slalom, standing	50.90	+3.21	9	54.18	+2.90	6	1:45.08	+6.11	8
Thomas Pfyl	Giant slalom, standing	1:18.31	+3.59	5	1:13.51	+2.36	5	2:31.82	+5.95	5
Jochi Roethlisberger	Super-G, standing	—N/a						1:33.07	+12.15	16
Jochi Roethlisberger	Combined, standing	DNF								
Jochi Roethlisberger	Slalom, standing	59.71	+12.02	30	1:03.14	+11.86	21	2:02.85	+23.88	23
Jochi Roethlisberger	Giant slalom, standing	1:26.67	+11.95	24	1:21.96	+10.81	19	2:48.63	+22.76	19
Hugo Thomas; Guide: Luana Bergamin	Downhill, visually impaired	—N/a						1:26.02	+4.26	8
Hugo Thomas; Guide: Luana Bergamin	Super-G, visually impaired	—N/a						DNS		

== See also ==
- Switzerland at the Paralympics
- Switzerland at the 2014 Winter Olympics
