= Óscar Espallargas =

Spanish Paralympic alpine skier

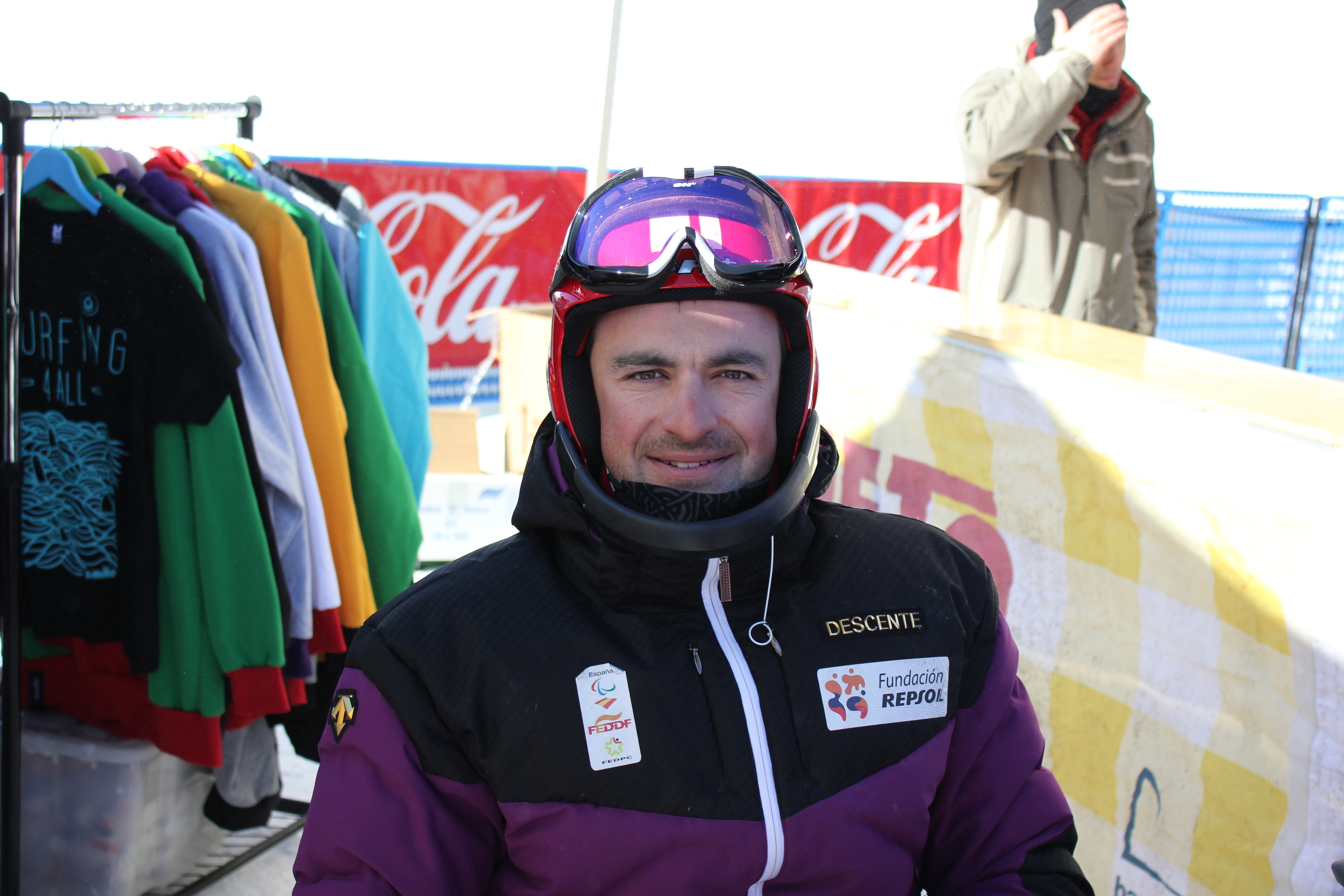
- Espallargas at the 2013 IPC Para-alpine World Championships at La Molina, Spain.

Personal information
- Full name: Óscar Antonio Espallargas Juarez
- Nationality: Spanish
- Born: 14 September 1982 (age 43) Alcañiz, Spain

Sport
- Country: Spain
- Sport: Para-alpine skiing
- Event(s): Downhill; Slalom; Giant slalom Super combined Super G
- Club: Cerler Aneto of Aragon

Óscar Antonio Espallargas Juarez (born 14 September 1982 in Alcañiz) is a Spanish para-alpine mono-skier. He has competed internationally at the European Cup, the IPC Alpine Skiing World Cup and the IPC Alpine Skiing World Championships. In 2011, he moved to Aran for the 2011/2012 ski season in order to be based at Centro de Deportes de Invierno Adaptados. He was a competitor in the Sochi 2014 Paralympic Winter Games.

== Skiing ==
Espallargas is a LW12-1 mono-skier. He competed at the 2007 European Cup, and the 2007 Spanish national championships where he medaled. At the last round of the European Cup in March 2008, an event held in La Molina, Spain, he was one of several non-vision impaired Spanish skiers competing at the event. He finished the 2007/2008 European Cup season in fifty-fifth place. In March 2009, he finished the European Cup fiftieth overall with 42 points. He competed at the third European Cup event held in La Molina in late January 2010, finishing ninth in the slalom event. The Campionat de Catalunya Open d'Esquí Alpí took place in late January 2010 with skiers representing the five regions of Spain including Aragon, Galicia, Catalonia, Madrid and the Basque Country. He represented Aragon as a member of the ski club, Cerler Aneto of Aragon, and finished first in the sitting category. At Aramón Cerler in April 2010, the last competition of the season organised by Campeonato de España de Esquí Alpino adaptado was held. He finished first in the Super G men's sitting event. He competed at the Vancouver from 5 to 7 April 2010. It was organised by the Federación Española de Deportes de Personas con Discapacidad Física (FEDDF), Federación Española de Deportes para Paralíticos Cerebrales (FEDPC) and Federación Española de Deportes para Ciegos (FEDC). He won a gold medal in the men's sitting event. In December 2010, he competed in the second stage of the European Cup with at a competition in Austria.

Espallargas competed at the Spanish national championships in April 2011. He finished first in the slalom event with a combined time of 1 min 26.13 s. At the 2011 World Championships held in Sestriere, Italy, Espallargas finished eighteenth in the slalom event. In October 2011, he underwent medical tests at the CSD Sports Council in Madrid. As part of the trip to Madrid, he also visited the indoor snow zone at Madrid Xanadu shopping center where he participated in several training sessions. In November 2011, he was classified at an event in the Netherlands. While there, he also worked on improving her performance by training for the slalom at an indoor ski venue in the country at a camp attended by 100 skiers from fifteen countries In 2011, he moved to Aran for the 2011/2012 ski season in order to be based at Centro de Deportes de Invierno Adaptados. In November 2011 at the first IPC sanctioned event of the year which was held in the Netherlands, he finished eighth in the slalom event. He participated in the 2012 Campeonatos de España de Esquí held in Valle de Arán, where the slalom, giant slalom, and super-G events were contested. He medaled at the competition. Near the end of the 2011/2012 ski season, he participated in an IPC Alpine Skiing World Cup event in Italy where he finished twenty-sixth in the giant slalom event.

Espallargas was a competitor in the Sochi 2014 Paralympic Winter Games, finishing the men's slalom – sitting in 14th place and men's giant slalom – sitting in 13th place.
