= Mac Marcoux =

Canadian para-alpine skier

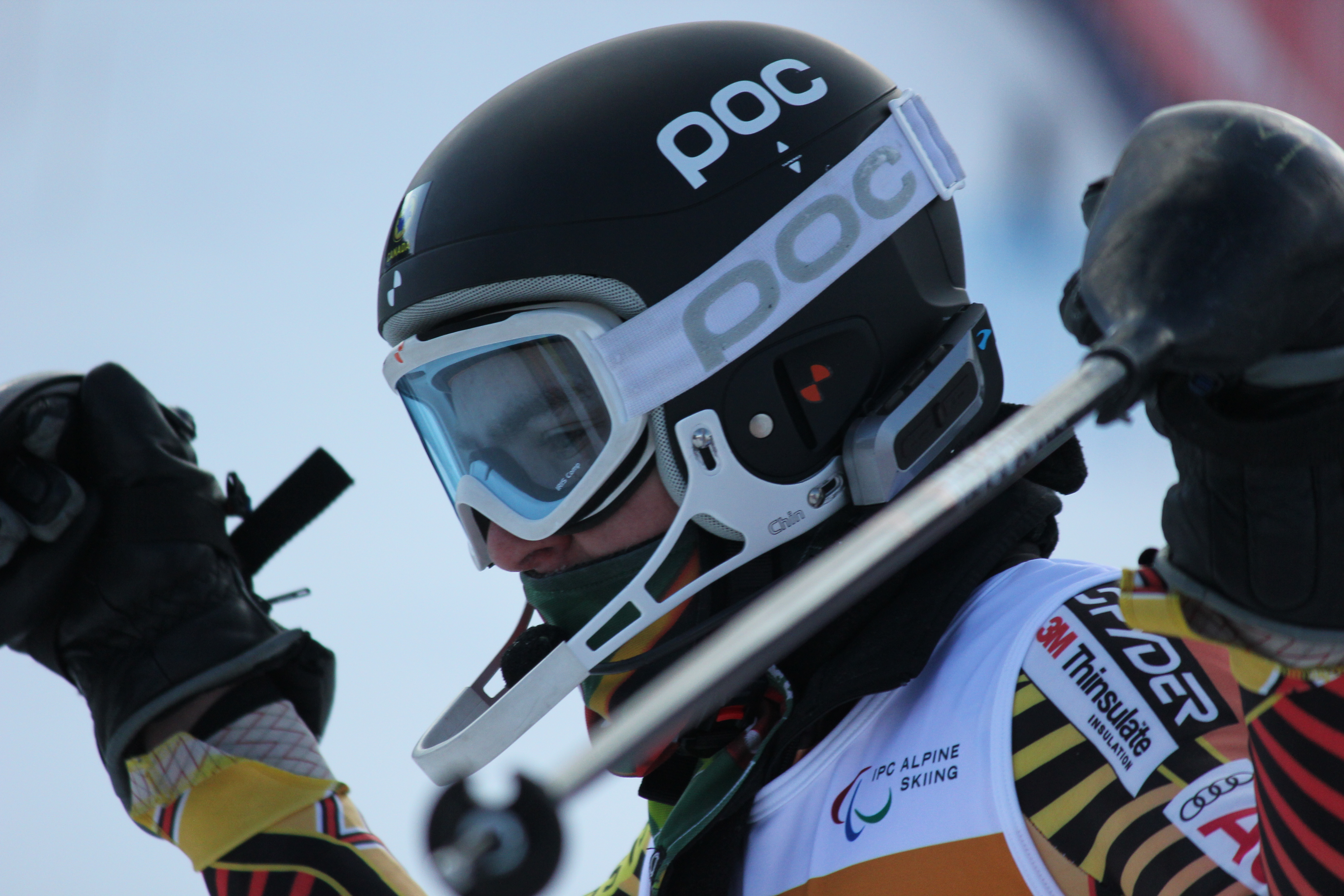
- Marcoux in the 2013 IPC Alpine World Championships at La Molina in Spain.

Personal information
- Full name: Macmilton Marcoux
- Born: 20 June 1997 (age 29)
- Height: 173 cm (5 ft 8 in)
- Weight: 70.3 kg (155 lb)
- Other interests: Fishing, four-wheeling

Sport
- Country: Canada
- Sport: Para-alpine skiing
- Turned pro: 2013
Medal record
Men's para alpine skiing
Representing Canada
Winter Paralympics
Gold medal – first place	2014 Sochi	Giant slalom, visually impaired
Gold medal – first place	2018 Pyeongchang	Downhill, visually impaired
Silver medal – second place	2022 Beijing	Downhill, visually impaired
Bronze medal – third place	2014 Sochi	Downhill, visually impaired
Bronze medal – third place	2014 Sochi	Super-G, visually impaired
Bronze medal – third place	2018 Pyeongchang	Giant slalom, visually impaired
World Championships
Gold medal – first place	2015 Panorama	Downhill, visually impaired
Gold medal – first place	2017 Tarvisio	Downhill, visually impaired
Gold medal – first place	2017 Tarvisio	Giant slalom, visually impaired
Gold medal – first place	2017 Tarvisio	Slalom, visually impaired
Gold medal – first place	2017 Tarvisio	Super-G, visually impaired
Silver medal – second place	2013 La Molina	Giant slalom, visually impaired
Silver medal – second place	2015 Panorama	Super-G, visually impaired
Silver medal – second place	2017 Tarvisio	Super Combined, visually impaired
- Updated on 7 August 2014

Macmilton "Mac" Marcoux (born 20 June 1997) is a Canadian Paralympic alpine skier who won three titles at the IPC Alpine Skiing World Cup at the age of 15. With guide Robin Femy, he won three medals in alpine skiing at the 2014 Winter Paralympics, including gold in the men's visually impaired giant slalom. He also has numerous awards including being inducted into the Sault Ste. Marie Walk of Fame. He has an older brother and a younger sister. He also enjoys riding BMX and mountain bikes.

== Personal life ==
Mac Marcoux was born on 20 June 1997 in Haviland Bay, Ontario. He resides there with his parents and two siblings, an older brother and a younger sister. He started skiing at the age of four. He also rode BMX bikes and raced go-karts. In 2006, he started losing his sight due to Stargardt disease, a degenerative condition, and became legally blind in 2007. He said: "We've always been a racing family from the beginning. It's how I've grown up. Going fast was just a part of it. The faster you go the more fun it is".

After Marcoux had lost his vision, his brother Billy Joe (B.J.) Marcoux decided to put his college education on hold in order to assist him with skiing. Alpine Canada introduced them to a new kind of skiing called Para-Alpine. They were inspired by the McKeever brothers to do visually impaired para-alpine. Other than the Paralympics, his brother B.J. has been his sighted guide using radio communication ever since then; something they had never used before.

== Para-Alpine career ==
Marcoux is classified as a B3 (visually impaired) athlete. At the age of 15, he competed at the 2013 IPC Alpine Skiing World Cup in Mount Hutt, New Zealand, with B.J. as his guide, winning three medals. Later that year he won a silver medal in the giant slalom at the 2013 IPC Alpine Skiing World Championships in La Molina, Spain, and became the national Slalom and giant slalom champion at Sun Peaks, British Columbia.

=== 2014 Winter Paralympics ===
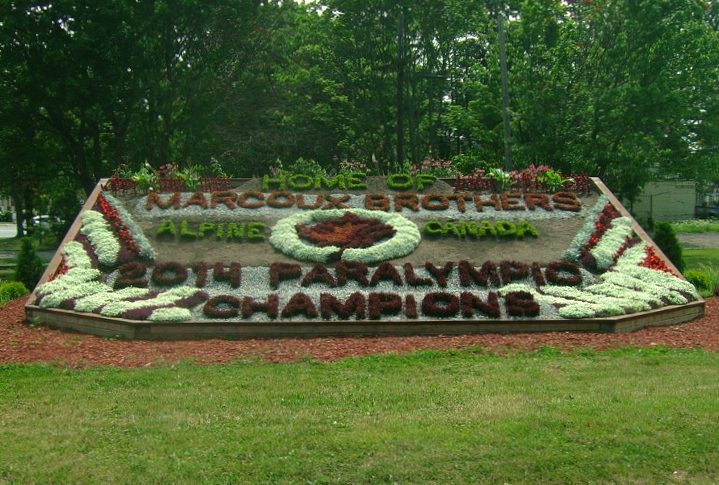
The flower bed in Sault Ste. Marie honouring the Marcoux brothers.

The following year he competed in the 2014 Winter Paralympics in Sochi as the youngest member of the Canadian Paralympic Team at the age of 16. With Robin Femy as his guide. He won bronze in both the Downhill and the Super-G, as well as a gold in the giant slalom by over two seconds. "It is the best moment of my life", he said after winning gold. "I can't even explain how amazing this is."

Mac and his brother B.J. were inducted into the Sault Ste. Marie Walk of Fame on 19 September 2014.

=== Post-Sochi ===
At the 2017 World Championships he won gold in the downhill, giant slalom, slalom, and super-G. He also won silver in the super combined.

== Other interests ==
He raced BMX bikes and go-karts with his brother B.J. before he was blind. After he lost his sight, he fished and also rode mountain bikes at Whistler with a guide using the same kind of radio communication system.

== Awards ==
Marcoux and his brother BJ was presented the H.P. Broughton Trophy and was named into the Sault Ste. Marie Walk of Fame. In October 2014, the brothers were also inducted into the Sault Ste. Marie Sports Hall of Fame by mayor Debbie Amaroso.

== See also ==
- Canada at the 2014 Winter Paralympics
