= Andorra at the Paralympics =

- IPC code: AND
- NPC: Andorran Adapted Sports Federation
- Website: www.fadea.ad
- Medals: Gold 0 Silver 0 Bronze 0 Total 0

Summer appearances
- 2012; 2016–2024

Winter appearances
- 2002; 2006; 2010; 2014; 2018; 2022

Andorra first competed at the Winter Paralympic Games in 2002, and competed again in 2006. Andorra has only ever competed in alpine skiing, and has never won a medal. Andorrans did not participate in the Summer Paralympic Games until 2012.
