= Jonathan Lujan =

American Paralympic alpine skier

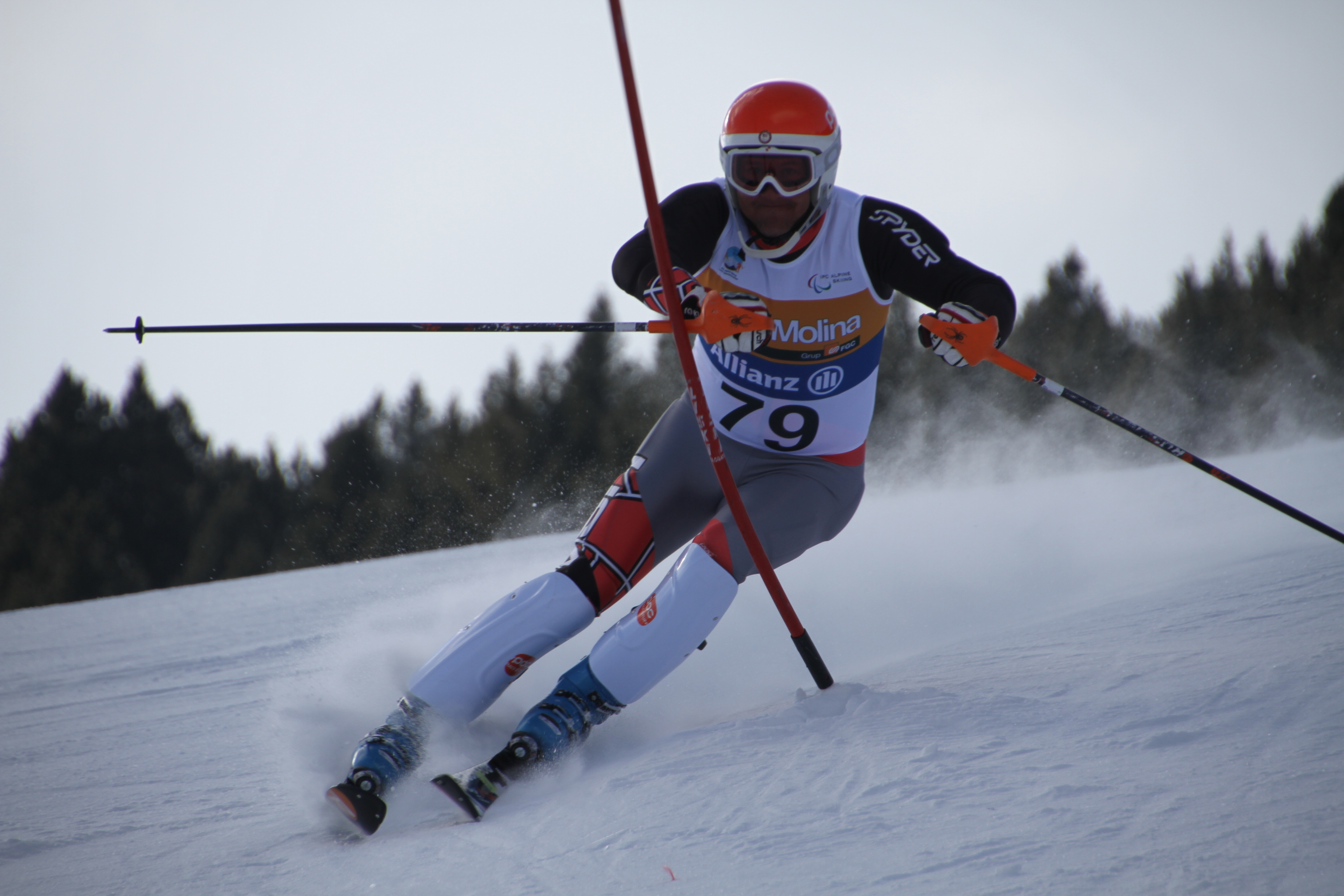
- 2013 World Championships La Molina Spain, Slalom

Personal information
- Nationality: American
- Born: February 21, 1971 (age 55) Denver, Colorado
- Height: 5 ft 10 in (1.78 m)
- Weight: 190 lb (86.2 kg)

Sport
- Country: United States
- Sport: Paralympic Alpine skiing
Medal record
Representing United States
Paralympic Alpine Skiing
US National Championships
Gold medal – first place	2012 Aspen CO	Downhill standing
Gold medal – first place	2012 Aspen CO	Super Giant Slalom Standing
Bronze medal – third place	2012 Waterville Valley NH	Giant Slalom Standing
Silver medal – second place	2013 Winter Park CO	Super Giant Slalom Standing

Jonathan Lujan (born February 21, 1971) is a Paralympic alpine skier from the United States.

Lujan grew up in Littleton, Colorado before joining the United States Marine Corps in 1993 and was honorable discharged in 1997, where he returned to Colorado to become more active in parenting his young daughter Emily. After the attacks of September 11, 2001, he re-enlisted in the Marine Corps and was subsequently deployed to Kuwait in support of Operation Iraqi Freedom. During the initial ground war Lujan was injured while riding in the rear of a vehicle and suffered two ruptured discs in his lower back. Complications from the surgery resulted in paralysis of his lower legs. He was medically retired from the Marine Corps in 2006 due to those injuries.

In 2008 Lujan attended the National Disabled Veterans Winter Sports Clinic where he was introduced to ski racing by a ski coach named Scott Olson. He spent the next 3 years skiing part-time for the National Sports Center for the Disabled in Winter Park, Colorado. Realizing that if he wanted to be more competitive he needed to ski full-time, in 2011 Lujan quit his job and moved to Aspen, Colorado to ski for the Aspen Valley Ski and Snowboard Club (AVSC). In his first year racing full-time Lujan won two National Championship titles in Downhill and Super Giant Slalom on his home hill in Aspen.

He also was the bronze medalist in US Nationals in Giant Slalom and also took home another gold and two silvers at NORAM races.

In 2012 he was named to the 2012–2013 US Paralympic National B Team and also competed at the 2013 World Championships in La Molina, Spain.

Lujan was the Runner up for the 2012–2103 Super Giant Slalom National Championship, and took home two more silver medals in NORAM competitions in North America.

Lujan was named to the 2013–2014 US Paralympic National B Team, and was a member of the 2014 Winter Paralympics US alpine skiing team. Lujan also writes a blogs about his experiences as a professional athlete on the Team USA website as a winter athlete. Lujan is represented by Heather Novikis of Octagon Action Sports.
