= Nick Brush =

Canadian para-alpine skier

Personal information
- Nationality: Canadian
- Born: Canada

Sport
- Country: Canada
- Sport: Alpine skiing
- Event(s): Downhill; Slalom; Giant slalom Super combined Super G

Nicholas Brush is a Canadian alpine skier, sighted guide and Paralympian.

He competed as the sighted guide for Chris Williamson in the 2010 Winter Paralympics in Vancouver, British Columbia, Canada. They became 4th in the giant slalom, 6th in the slalom, 4th in the super combined, visually impaired, and 6th in the super-G, visually impaired. They obtained the bronze medal in the men's slalom, visually impaired at the 2014 Winter Paralympics in Sochi, Russia.
