= Akira Kano =

Japanese para-alpine skier (born 1986)

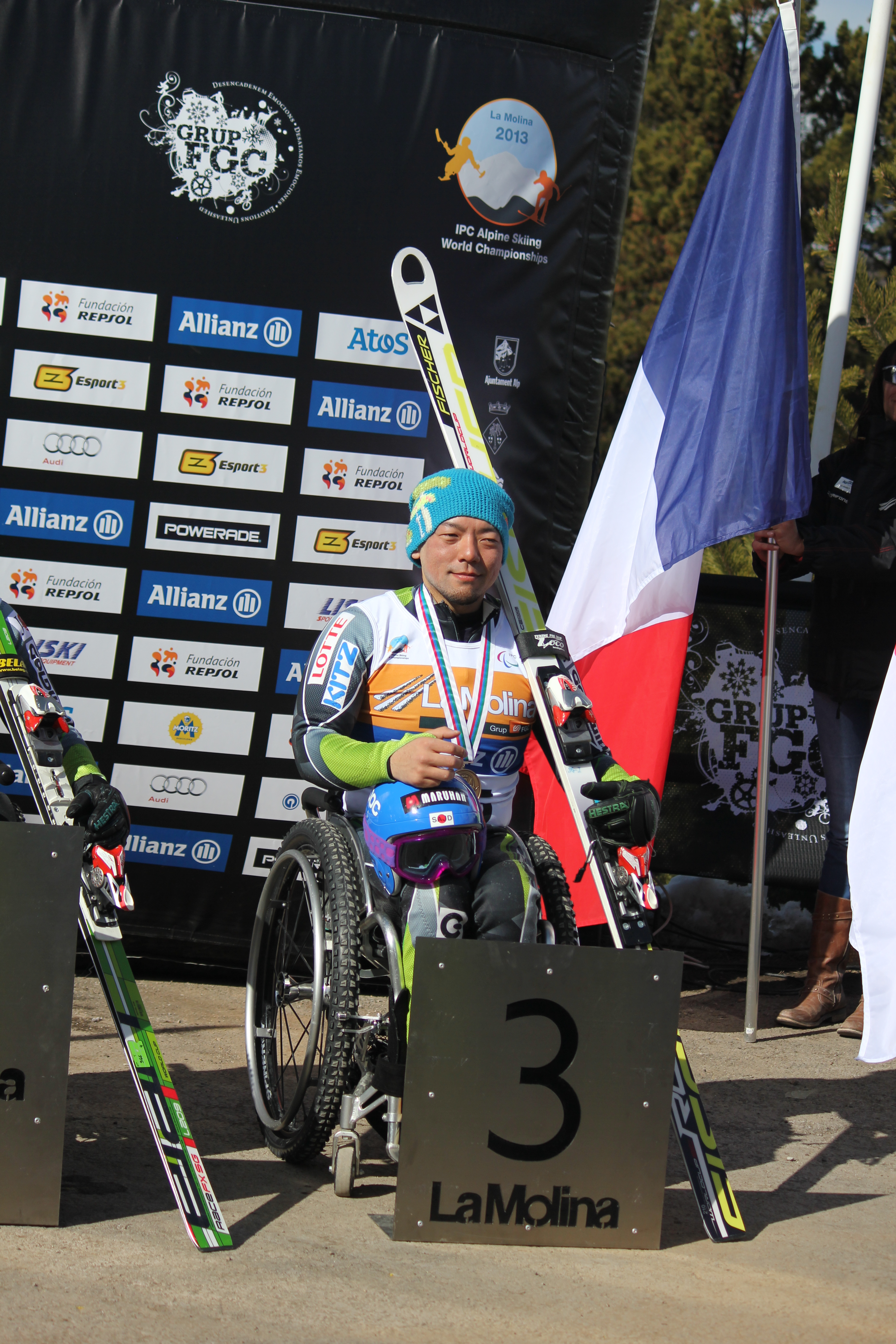
- Kano with bronze medal at the 2013 IPC Para-alpine World Championships at La Molina, Spain

Personal information
- Nationality: Japan
- Born: March 14, 1986 (age 40) Abashiri, Hokkaido, Japan

Sport
- Country: Japan
- Sport: Alpine skiing
- Event(s): Downhill slalom Giant slalom Super combined Super G
Medal record
Men's para alpine skiing
Representing Japan
Paralympic Games
Gold medal – first place	2010 Vancouver	Super-G, sitting
Bronze medal – third place	2010 Vancouver	Downhill, sitting
Gold medal – first place	2014 Sochi	Super-G, sitting
Gold medal – first place	2014 Sochi	Downhill, sitting

Akira Kano (狩野 亮, Kanō Akira; born March 14, 1986) is a Japanese alpine skier and Paralympic Champion.

He competed in the 2006 Winter Paralympics in Turin, Italy, where he became 27th at the Slalom, sitting.

He competed in the 2010 Winter Paralympics in Vancouver, British Columbia, Canada. He won a gold medal in the super-G and bronze in the Downhill, sitting. He became 6th at the Slalom, sitting.

He competed in the 2014 Winter Paralympics in Sochi, Russia. He won a gold medal in the Super-G as well as gold in the Downhill, sitting.
