= Xavier Fernandez =

Andorran alpine skier (born 1972)

Personal information
- Born: 19 November 1972 (age 53)

Sport
- Sport: Alpine skiing

Xavier Fernandez (born 19 November 1972) is an alpine skier who represented Andorra at the 2014 Winter Paralympics. He also competed in the 2010 Winter Paralympics.
