= Roman Rabl =

Austrian alpine skier (born 1991)

Personal information
- Born: 11 June 1991 (age 35) Tyrol, Austria

Sport
- Country: Austria
- Sport: Para alpine skiing
- Position: Sitting
Medal record
Men's para alpine skiing
Representing Austria
Paralympic Games
Bronze medal – third place	2014 Sochi	Slalom, sitting
Bronze medal – third place	2014 Sochi	Giant slalom, sitting
Bronze medal – third place	2014 Sochi	Combined, sitting

Roman Rabl (born 11 June 1991 in Tyrol) is an Austrian alpine skier who won three bronze medals at the 2014 Winter Paralympics. He also competed at the 2018 Winter Paralympics and 2022 Winter Paralympics.
