= Vincent Gauthier-Manuel =

French alpine skier (born 1986)

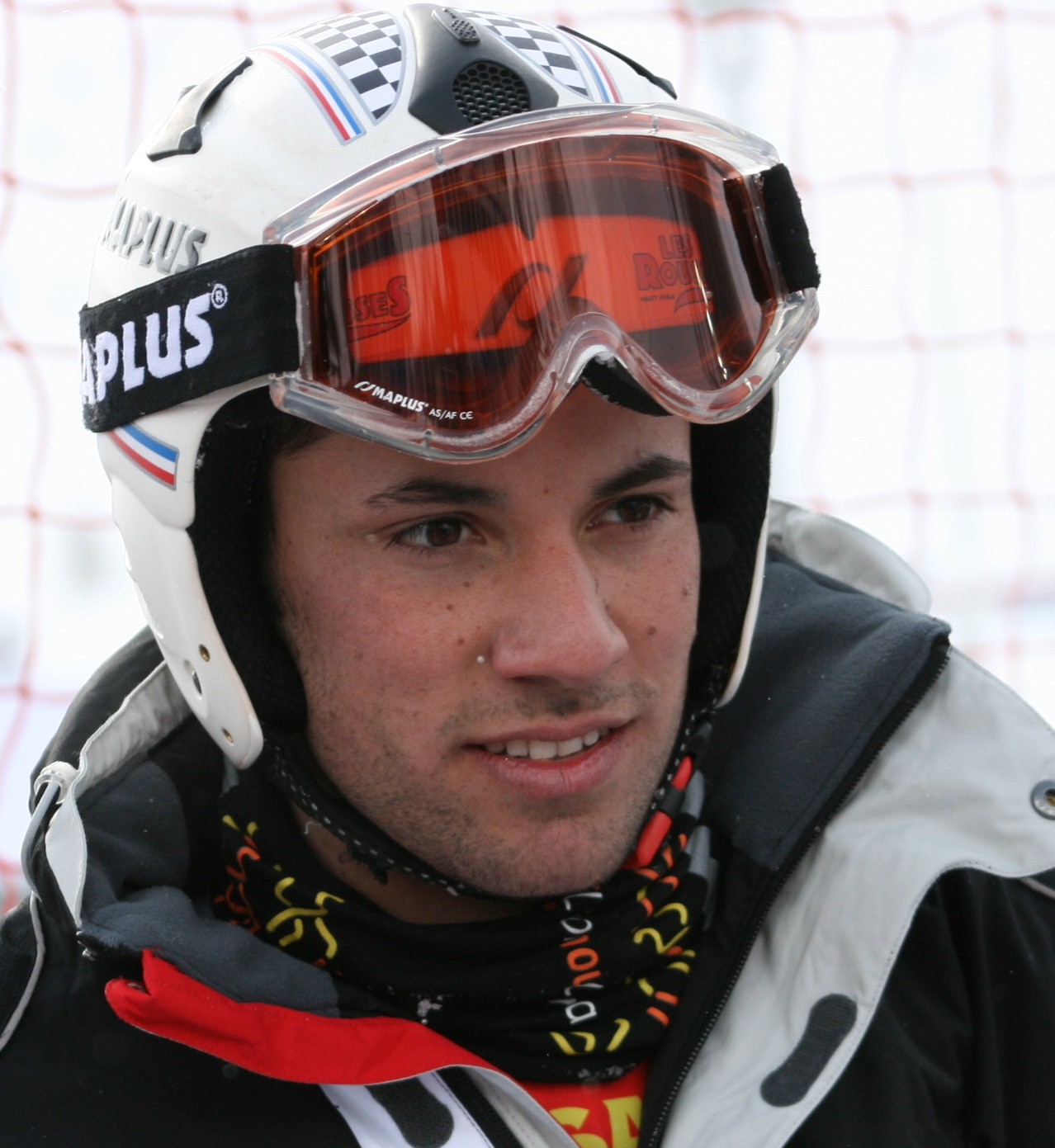

Personal information
- Nationality: French
- Born: 6 April 1986 (age 40) France Canada
- Website: www.vincent-team.com

Sport
- Country: France
- Sport: Alpine skiing
- Event(s): Downhill, slalom, giant slalom, super combined, super-G
Medal record
Men's para alpine skiing
Representing France
Paralympic Games
Gold medal – first place	2014 Sotchi	Slalom, standing
Silver medal – second place	2010 Vancouver	Super combined, standing
Bronze medal – third place	2010 Vancouver	Giant slalom, standing
World Championships
Gold medal – first place	2013 La Molina	Downhill, standing
Gold medal – first place	2013 La Molina	Super combined, standing
Gold medal – first place	2013 La Molina	Giant slalom, standing
Gold medal – first place	2013 La Molina	Slalom, standing

Vincent Gauthier-Manuel (born 6 April 1986) is a French alpine skier and Paralympic athlete.

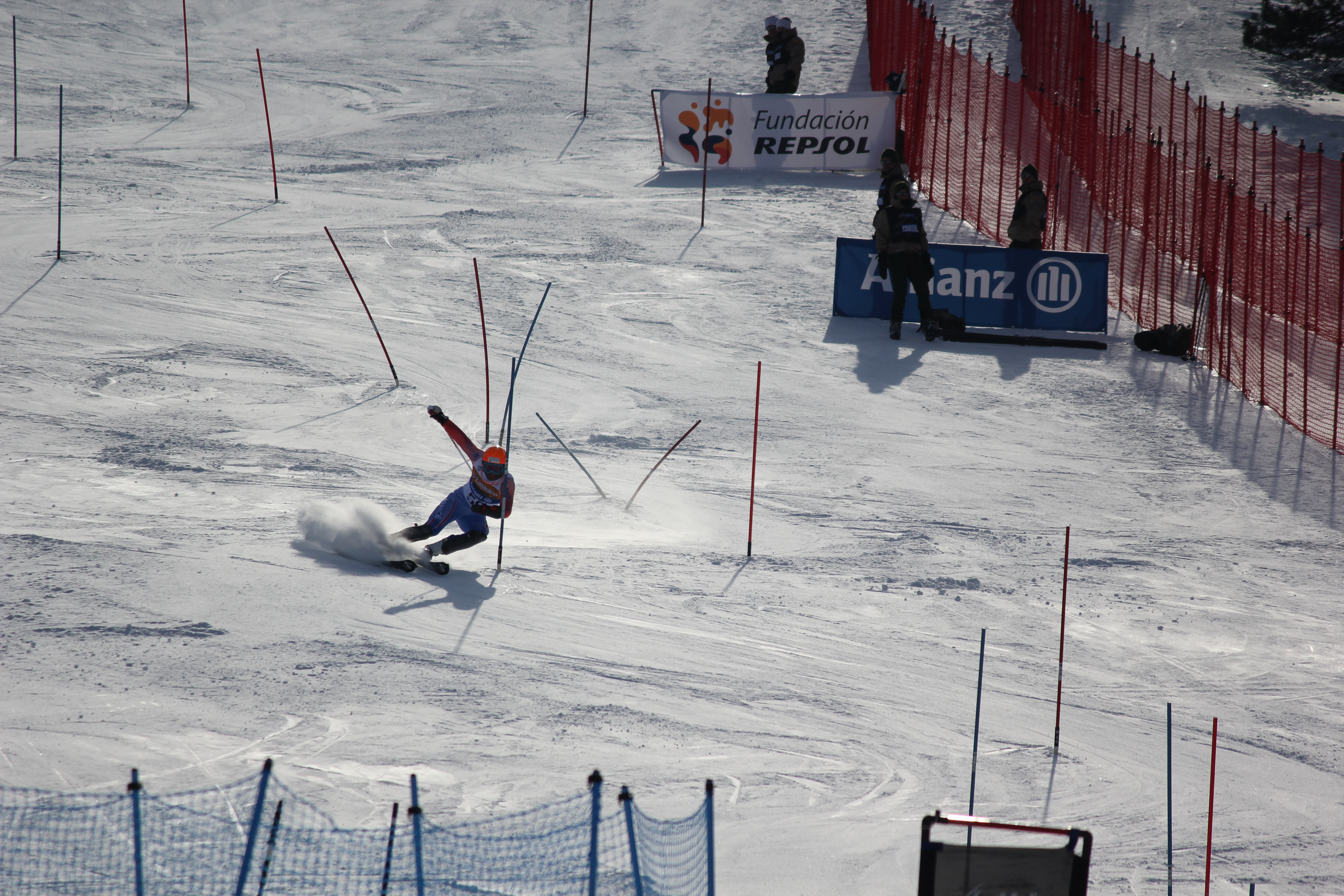
Gauthier-Manuel at the 2013 World Championships

He competed in the 2014 Winter Paralympics in Sochi, Russia. He won a gold medal in the slalom, standing, and a bronze medal in the giant slalom, standing. Gauthier was awarded the National Order of Merit in 2010.

== Golf ==
Although he was born missing most of his left arm, Gauthier started to play golf in 2013. He played his first Pro-AM before the Saint-Omer Open in 2014.
