= Christoph Kunz =

Swiss para-alpine skier (born 1982)

Personal information
- Nationality: Swiss
- Born: March 24, 1982 (age 44) Frutigen, Switzerland

Sport
- Country: Switzerland
- Sport: Alpine skiing
- Event(s): Downhill; Slalom; Giant slalom Super combined Super G
Medal record
Men's Alpine skiing
Representing Switzerland
Paralympic Games
Gold medal – first place	2010 Vancouver	Downhill, sitting
Silver medal – second place	2010 Vancouver	Giant slalom, sitting
Gold medal – first place	2014 Sochi	Giant slalom, sitting
IPC Alpine Skiing World Championships
Bronze medal – third place	2011 Sestriere	Giant slalom, sitting
Bronze medal – third place	2013 La Molina	Giant slalom, sitting

Christoph Kunz (born 24 March 1982) is an alpine skier who won a gold and a silver medal for Switzerland at the 2010 Winter Paralympics. Kunz also represented Switzerland at the 2014 Winter Paralympics in Sochi winning a gold medal in the giant slalom.
