= Enrique Plantey =

Argentine Paralympic alpine skier

Personal information
- Born: 29 August 1982 (age 43) Neuquén, Argentina

Sport
- Country: Argentina
- Sport: alpine skiing

Enrique Plantey (born August 29, 1982) is an Argentine Paralympic alpine skier. He participated in three Paralympic Games, 2014, 2018 and 2022. His best placement is fourth, in men's giant slalom in 2022. He lives in Buenos Aires, Argentina.

== Biography ==
Plantey was born in the city of Neuquén on August 29, 1982, although days later he moved with his family to the rural area. When he was 11, Plantey was in a car accident on Route 22 over the town of Senillosa. His father and brother died, and Plantey suffered a spinal cord injury that left him in a wheelchair. After the accident, he traveled to Cuba for four months with his mother for physical therapy.

Despite his injury, Plantey's high school physical education teacher encouraged him to continue practicing sports such as basketball, volleyball and handball.

His first contact with adapted skiing was at the age of 14, when he was on vacation with friends in San Martín de los Andes. He was approached by the head of the Argentine adapted ski team who invited him to try skiing. In 2010, Plantey travelled to Aspen, Colorado, U.S., where he had the opportunity to compete against Taylor Walker, the number one-ranked adapted skier. After returning to Argentina, he contacted an instructor who was creating an adapted skiing team in Mendoza Province, and began training at Las Leñas.

In 2010, Plantey travelled the five continents with a friend, writing his experiences in a blog.

== Sports career ==
In December 2010, Plantey competed at Copper Mountain, U.S. He finished in 19th place at the 2014 Sochi Paralympic Games and third place in the French National Championship.

In 2017, Plantey was ranked 13th in the Alpine Ski World Championship held in Kranjska Gora, Slovenia. This gave him enough points to qualify for the 2018 Pyeongchang Paralympic Games.

== Personal life ==
Plantey is a law student at the University of Buenos Aires, and works at the Council of the Magistracy of the Autonomous City of Buenos Aires.

In 2017, he won an award granted by the ALPI.
