= Josh Dueck =

Canadian para-alpine skier (born 1981)

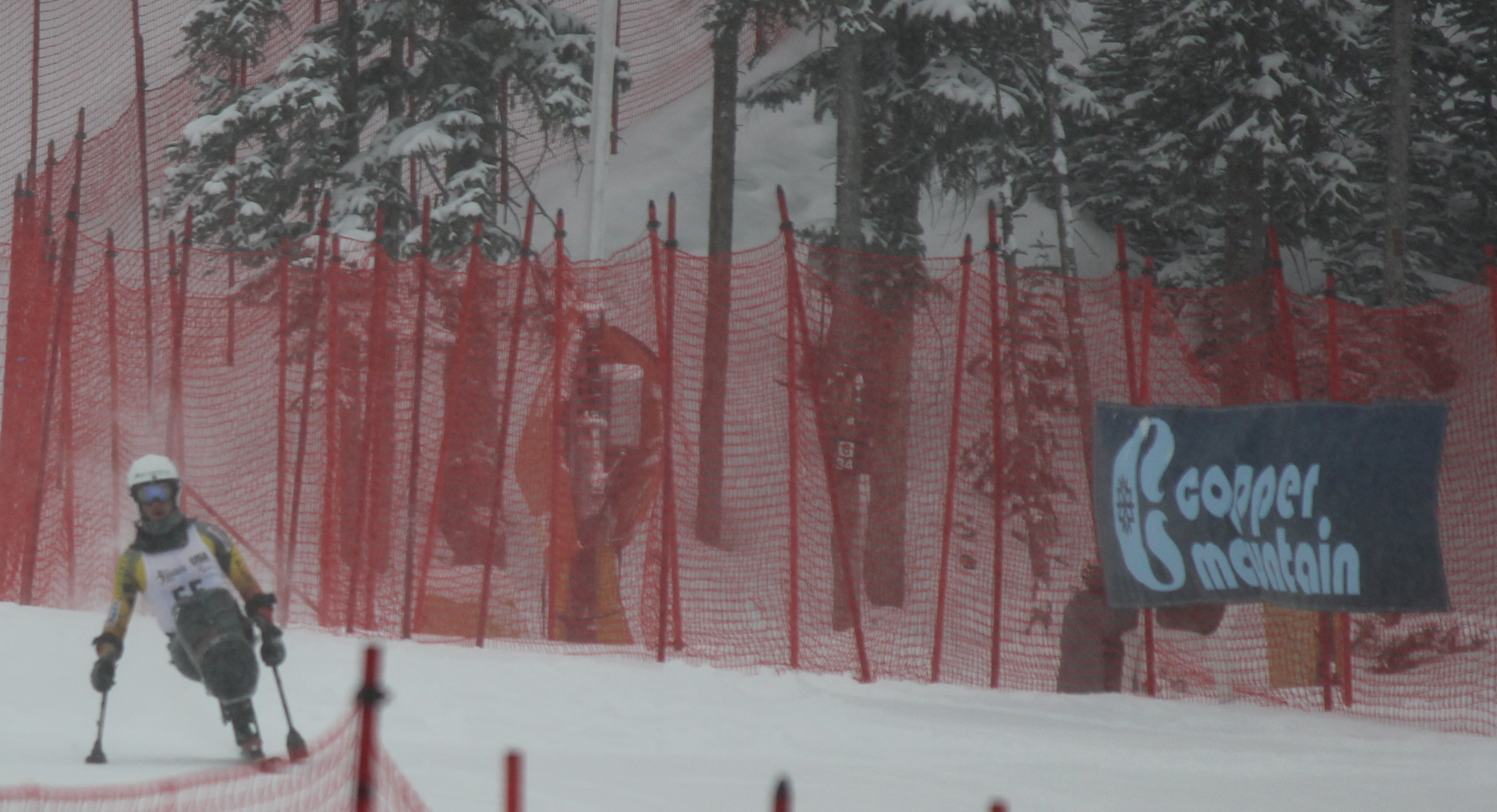
- Canadian para-alpine skier at IPC Nor-Am Cup in the Super G.

Personal information
- Nickname: Duey
- Nationality: Canadian
- Born: Joshua Peter Dueck; January 13, 1981 (age 45) Kimberley, British Columbia
- Height: 173 cm (5 ft 8 in)
- Weight: 68 kg (150 lb) (2010)
- Website: joshdueck.com | thisamazinglife.com

Sport
- Country: Canada
- Sport: Professional skier
- Event: Downhill
- Club: Silver Star Mountain Resort
- Coached by: J. S. Labrie
- Now coaching: freelance

Achievements and titles
- Highest world ranking: 1st
Medal record
Men's para-alpine skiing
Representing Canada
Winter Paralympics
Silver medal – second place	2010 Vancouver	Men's slalom, sitting
Gold medal – first place	2014 Sochi	Men's combined, sitting
Silver medal – second place	2014 Sochi	Men's downhill, sitting
Winter X Games
Gold medal – first place	2011 Aspen	Mono skier X
Bronze medal – third place	2012 Aspen	Mono skier X

Josh Dueck (born January 13, 1981) is a Canadian alpine skier. He won a silver medal at the 2010 Winter Paralympics in the men's slalom sit-ski event. On February 3, 2012, Josh became the first person to perform a backflip on snow in a Sit Ski.

== Personal life ==
Dueck was born on January 13, 1981, in Kimberley, British Columbia and now resides at Vernon, British Columbia. He was a former freestyle skier and coach before he became disabled. He became disabled when he overshot a demonstration jump in March 2004, breaking his back and left him as a T11 classification. He told reporters, "I knew deeply and intuitively that it was a bad idea".

== Career ==
=== Vancouver 2010 ===
Dueck has entered the 2010 Paralympics just 6 years after he became disabled. He won silver at the slalom for a time of 1:24.19. "I had a line in mind and I was able to stick to it. I took some chances, got lucky. Pretty sure I had some angels on my side for a few of those gates I was just clipping. Second is awesome." the 33-year-old said.

== Accomplishments ==
Dueck won both silver and gold medals at the 2014 Winter Paralympics in Sochi, Russia, as well as a silver medal at the 2010 Winter Paralympics in Vancouver. As a sit-skier, he has also won gold in mono skier X at the 2011 Winter X Games, bronze at the 2012 Winter X Games, and has won multiple IPC World Cup podiums and is the 2009 world downhill champion. In February 2012, Dueck became the first sit-skier to complete a backflip on snow,– earning him world-wide notoriety and an appearance on The Ellen DeGeneres Show. He is an advocate for workplace safety and accessibility in sport, and in 2013 gave a TED Talk about his experiences.
