= Andorran Adapted Sports Federation =

Disability organization based in Andorra

National Paralympic Committee
- Country: Andorra
- Code: AND
- Headquarters: Ordino, Andorra
- President: Jordi Casellas Albiol
- Secretary General: Toni Sanchez Francisco
- Website: fadea.ad

The Andorran Adapted Sports Federation (Catalan: Federació Andorrana d'esports adaptats, FADEA) is the National Paralympic Committee in Andorra for the Paralympic Games movement. It is a non-profit organisation that selects teams, and raises funds to send Andorran competitors to Paralympic events organised by the International Paralympic Committee (IPC).

== See also ==
- Andorra at the Paralympics
