= Avacha =

Avacha may refer to:

- Avacha Bay, Kamchatka Peninsula, Russia
- Avacha (river), Kamchatka Peninsula, Russia
- Avacha Volcano, Kamchatka Peninsula, Russia, also called Avachinsky
