= Petropavlovsk-Kamchatsky =

City in Kamchatka Krai, Russia

Petropavlovsk-Kamchatsky Петропавловск-Камчатский
- City
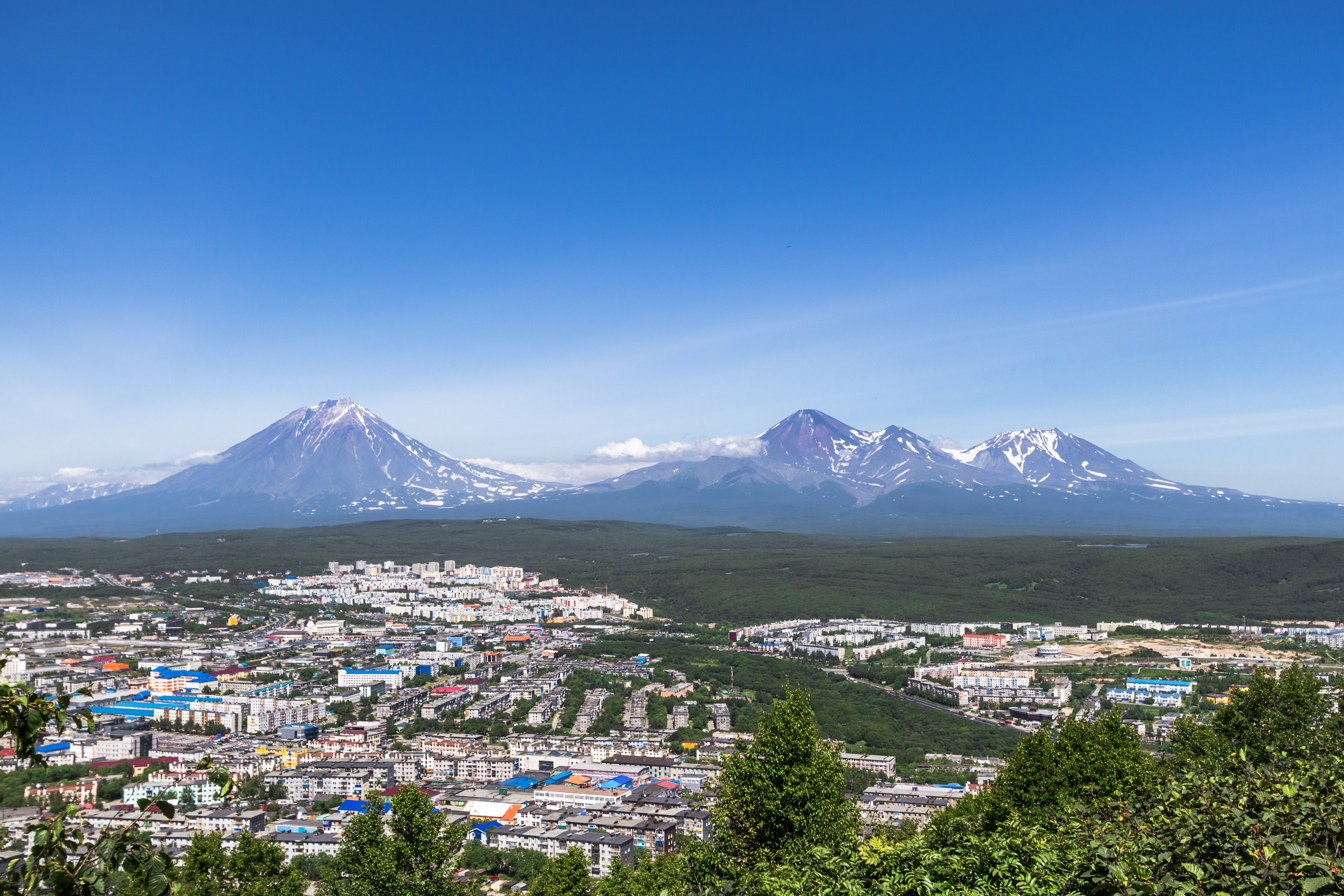
- Aerial view of Petropavlovsk-Kamchatsky with the Koryaksky volcano at left

- Flag Coat of arms
- Interactive map of Petropavlovsk-Kamchatsky
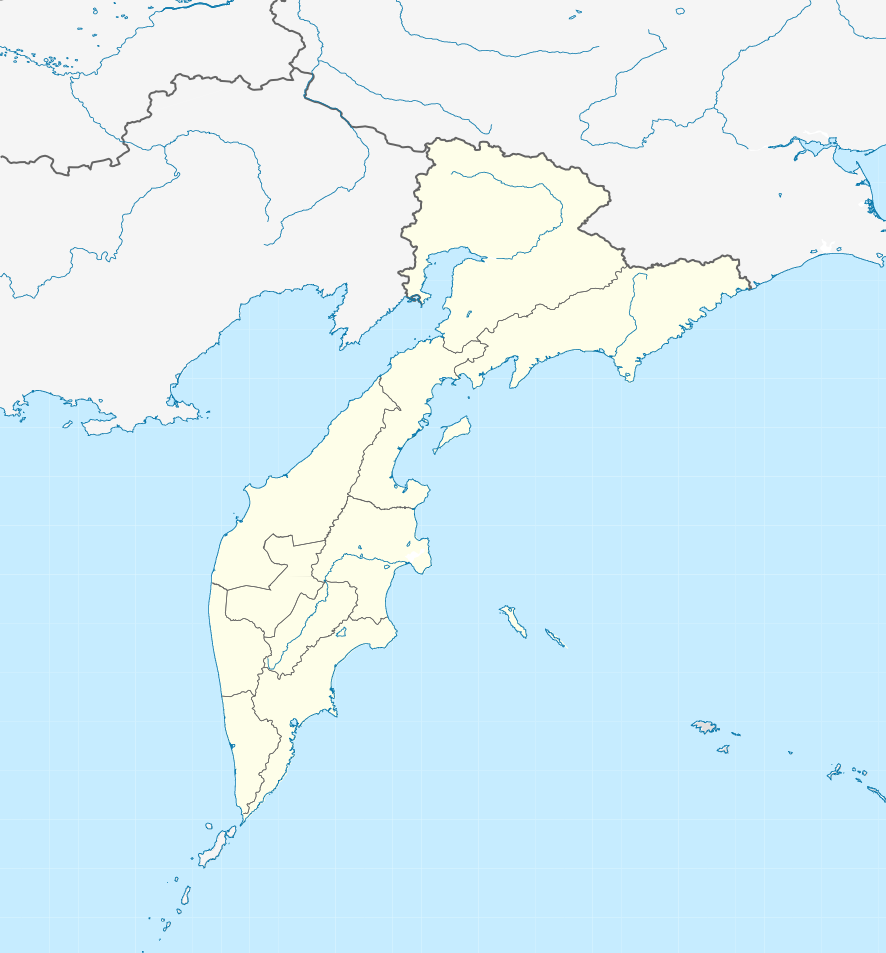
- Location of Petropavlovsk-Kamchatsky Petropavlovsk-Kamchatsky (Kamchatka Krai)
- Coordinates: 53°01′N 158°39′E
- Country: Russia
- Federal subject: Kamchatka Krai
- Founded: October 17, 1740

Government
  - Body: City Duma
  - Head: Konstantin Bryzgin

Area
  - Total: 362.15 km^{2} (139.83 sq mi)
- Elevation: 150 m (490 ft)

Population (2010 Census)
  - Total: 179,780
  - Estimate (2025): 164,900 (−8.3%)
  - Rank: 100th in 2010
  - Density: 496.42/km^{2} (1,285.7/sq mi)

Administrative status
  - Subordinated to: Petropavlovsk-Kamchatsky City Under Krai Jurisdiction
  - Capital of: Kamchatka Krai, Petropavlovsk-Kamchatsky City Under Krai Jurisdiction

Municipal status
  - Urban okrug: Petropavlovsk-Kamchatsky Urban Okrug
  - Capital of: Petropavlovsk-Kamchatsky Urban Okrug
- Time zone: UTC+12 (MSK+9)
- Postal code: 683000 (main)
- Dialing code: +7 4152
- OKTMO ID: 30701000001
- City Day: October 17
- Website: pkgo.ru

Petropavlovsk-Kamchatsky (Russian: Петропавловск-Камчатский, IPA: [pʲɪtrɐˈpavləfsk kɐmˈtɕatskʲɪj]) is a port city and the administrative center of Kamchatka Krai, Russia. It is located in the Far East of the country and lies along the coast of Avacha Bay by the Pacific Ocean, nearby Khalaktyrskoye Lake. As of the 2021 census, it had a population of 164,900. The Port of Petropavlovsk-Kamchatskiy is on Avacha Bay.

The city is widely known simply as Petropavlovsk (literally "city of Peter and Paul"). The adjective Kamchatsky ("Kamchatkan") was added to the official name in 1924.

== History ==
Section of Mikhail Tebenkov's 1872 Petropavlovsk harbor chart

=== Origins ===
Cossack units visited the area from 1697. The explorer and navigator Captain Vitus Bering (a Danish-born Russian) is considered to have founded the city in 1740, although navigator Ivan Fomich Yelagin had laid the foundation a few months earlier. Bering reached Avacha Bay in late 1740 and in his capacity as the superior officer, named the new settlement "Petropavlovsk" (Peter and Paul) after his two ships, the Saint Peter and the Saint Paul, which had been built in Okhotsk for his second expedition (1733–42). The town's location on the eastern coast of the Kamchatka Peninsula, on the sheltered Avacha Bay and at the mouth of the Avacha River, saw it develop to become the most important settlement in Kamchatka. It gained town status on April 9, 1812.

=== Crimean War ===
During the 1853–55 Crimean War, Anglo-French forces initiated the Siege of Petropavlovsk (August–September 1854), but it never fell. The city had been fortified under the overall command of Nikolay Muravyov (Governor-General of the Eastern Siberia Governorate-General from 1847 to 1861) in the preceding years, but possessed only a small garrison of a few hundred soldiers and sixty-seven cannon. After much exchange of fire, six hundred Anglo-French troops landed south of the city; two hundred and thirty Russian troops forced them to retreat after heavy fighting (September 1, 1854). Four days later, a larger force of nine hundred Anglo-French troops landed east of the town, but again the Russians repelled the allies (September 5, 1854). The allied ships then retreated from Russian Pacific waters (September 7, 1854). The total Russian losses were reported at around a hundred men; the Anglo-French were said to have lost 209 men, over twice that number.

=== Post-World War II ===
At the time of the surrender of Japan in World War II (August/September 1945), United States Naval Construction Battalion 114 was in the Aleutians. In September 1945 the battalion received orders to send a detachment to the USSR to build a Naval Advance Base (a Fleet Weather Central) – located ten miles outside Petropavlovsk-Kamchatsky and code-named TAMA. The original agreement gave the Seabees three weeks to complete the camp. Upon arrival the Soviets told the Seabees they had ten days, and were amazed that the Seabees achieved the task. It was one of two to which Stalin agreed. The other was near Khabarovsk, in buildings provided by the Russians. For mail Petropavlovsk was assigned Navy number 1169, FPO San Francisco. The American use of these two bases proved short-lived.

Petropavlovsk was a great source of fish, particularly salmon, and crab meat for the Soviet Union in the 20th century. Following the end of the Soviet era in December 1991, fishing rights have also been granted to foreign interests. Poaching of salmon for their caviar at Petropavlovsk-Kamchatskiy remains a problem amid lax law-enforcement and widespread corruption.

=== 2020 earthquake ===
An M_{w} 7.5 earthquake occurred on March 25, 2020. The earthquake was the largest to occur in Russia since the 2013 Okhotsk Sea earthquake. In Petropavlovsk-Kamchatsky, 460 km (285 miles) away from the epicenter, the intensity was felt as a Modified Mercalli intensity scale V (moderate); objects fell in buildings and people ran out into the street for safety.

=== 2025 earthquake ===
On July 30, 2025, an M_{w} 8.8 earthquake occurred 119 km (73 miles) southeast of the city, the 6th strongest since 1900, causing moderate to severe damage along the coastline. The Rybachiy submarine base houses Russia's Pacific submarine fleet. It was built in Soviet times but received new piers in 2022. During the earthquake, tsunami waves damaged at least one of the piers.

=== 2026 snowstorm ===
In January 2026, the Kamchatka Peninsula, including Petropavlovsk‑Kamchatsky, experienced an unprecedented snowstorm. Meteorological officials reported snow depths of up to 2.5 metres (8 ft 2 in) in some areas, with snowdrifts reaching 5 metres (16 ft). The storm paralyzed daily life, burying roads and buildings and disrupting transportation. It was described as the heaviest snowfall in approximately 60 years, and some sources suggested it could be the most severe in over a century for the region.

== Geography ==
The city is situated at sea level and surrounded by volcanoes. The surrounding terrain is mountainous enough that the horizon cannot be seen clearly from any point in town. The city also hosts a key strategic port situated on Avacha Bay, the Port of Petropavlovsk-Kamchatskiy. Across Avacha Bay from the city in Vilyuchinsk is Russia's largest submarine base, the Rybachiy Nuclear Submarine Base, established during the Soviet period and still used by the Russian Navy. The city is located 6,766 kilometres (4,204 mi) from Moscow and about 2,220 kilometres (1,380 mi) from Vladivostok.

=== Climate ===
The climate at Petropavlovsk-Kamchatskiy reasonably qualifies as a subarctic climate (Köppen Dfc), falling just short of a humid continental climate (Dfb). However, this area's climate has strong oceanic influences due its proximity to the Pacific Ocean. Average annual precipitation is 1,180 millimeters (46 in), or about 3.5 times as much as most of Siberia averages, mostly falling as frozen precipitation, primarily snow, from November to April. Average monthly precipitation is highest in autumn, with October and November the wettest months on average, averaging 154 mm and 156 mm of precipitation, respectively. May through July are markedly the driest months on average; June is the single driest month. Winter temperatures are much milder than in Siberia. Here, average January daytime high temperatures are around −4.0 °C (24.8 °F), while average daytime high temperature in August, the warmest month, is 17 °C (63 °F). Thus, resulting from oceanic cooling, summer daytime high temperatures in Petropavlovsk-Kamchatskiy are markedly cooler than in interior Siberia. In warmer-summer years, monthly high averages in July–August can reach 18 °C (64 °F) and higher. Days of above 20 °C (68 °F) can be expected an average of 19.6 days per summer.

Despite the generally high precipitation, the weather is less cloudy than in the adjacent Kuril Islands that are one of the least sunny places in the world, since the city is located behind a peninsula to the north that blocks some of the fog from the cold Oyashio Current offshore of the Kamchatka Peninsula. Oceanic water in Avacha Bay and adjacent bays is also warmer than coastal waters of Kuril Islands and Okhotsk sea coast (except Southern Kuriles and Southern Sakhalin).

In the spring (February to April), seawater may freeze.

Highest Temperature: 30.0 °C (86.0 °F) on July 2, 2012,

Lowest Temperature: −31.7 °C (−25.1 °F) on February 14, 1917,

Highest Daily Precipitation: 200.2 millimetres (7.88 in) on November 10, 2002,

Wettest Year: 1,996 millimetres (78.6 in) in 1971

Driest Year: 432 millimetres (17.0 in) in 1947

Climate data for Petropavlovsk-Kamchatskiy (1991–2020, extremes 1894–present)
Month	Jan	Feb	Mar	Apr	May	Jun	Jul	Aug	Sep	Oct	Nov	Dec	Year
Record high °C (°F)	5.2 (41.4)	6.2 (43.2)	8.5 (47.3)	18.8 (65.8)	20.6 (69.1)	26.9 (80.4)	30.0 (86.0)	27.7 (81.9)	24.4 (75.9)	19.4 (66.9)	12.6 (54.7)	10.5 (50.9)	30.0 (86.0)
Mean daily maximum °C (°F)	−4.0 (24.8)	−3.4 (25.9)	−0.3 (31.5)	3.6 (38.5)	8.6 (47.5)	13.7 (56.7)	17.0 (62.6)	17.5 (63.5)	14.7 (58.5)	8.5 (47.3)	1.8 (35.2)	−2.6 (27.3)	6.3 (43.3)
Daily mean °C (°F)	−6.5 (20.3)	−6.1 (21.0)	−3.4 (25.9)	0.4 (32.7)	4.8 (40.6)	9.5 (49.1)	13.0 (55.4)	13.7 (56.7)	10.7 (51.3)	5.5 (41.9)	−0.6 (30.9)	−5.0 (23.0)	3.0 (37.4)
Mean daily minimum °C (°F)	−8.9 (16.0)	−8.6 (16.5)	−5.9 (21.4)	−1.9 (28.6)	2.1 (35.8)	6.6 (43.9)	10.4 (50.7)	11.1 (52.0)	7.9 (46.2)	3.0 (37.4)	−2.7 (27.1)	−7.1 (19.2)	0.5 (32.9)
Record low °C (°F)	−28.6 (−19.5)	−31.7 (−25.1)	−24.8 (−12.6)	−14.8 (5.4)	−6.3 (20.7)	−1.5 (29.3)	2.5 (36.5)	4.2 (39.6)	−1.1 (30.0)	−7.5 (18.5)	−16.5 (2.3)	−26.0 (−14.8)	−31.7 (−25.1)
Average precipitation mm (inches)	110 (4.3)	75 (3.0)	103 (4.1)	88 (3.5)	58 (2.3)	57 (2.2)	66 (2.6)	91 (3.6)	105 (4.1)	154 (6.1)	156 (6.1)	115 (4.5)	1,178 (46.4)
Average extreme snow depth cm (inches)	79 (31)	104 (41)	117 (46)	103 (41)	22 (8.7)	0 (0)	0 (0)	0 (0)	0 (0)	0 (0)	8 (3.1)	39 (15)	117 (46)
Average rainy days	1	0.4	1	3	13	15	17	17	17	17	6	1	108
Average snowy days	18	18	18	17	7	0.1	0	0	0.03	3	15	17	113
Average relative humidity (%)	71	68	68	72	75	79	84	83	79	74	70	71	75
Mean monthly sunshine hours	105	114	176	192	193	196	169	178	178	157	122	93	1,870
Source 1: Pogoda.ru.net
Source 2: NOAA (sun 1961–1990)

Climate data for Petropavlovsk-Kamchatskiy
Month	Jan	Feb	Mar	Apr	May	Jun	Jul	Aug	Sep	Oct	Nov	Dec	Year
Average sea temperature °C (°F)	0.1 (32.2)	-0.6 (30.9)	-0.5 (31.1)	-0.2 (31.6)	2.2 (36.0)	6.8 (44.2)	10.3 (50.5)	12.3 (54.1)	10.3 (50.5)	7.3 (45.1)	4.8 (40.6)	1.8 (35.2)	4.6 (40.3)
Source: Weather Atlas

== Government and politics ==
=== Administrative and municipal status ===
Petropavlovsk-Kamchatsky is the administrative center of Kamchatka Krai. Within the framework of administrative divisions, it is incorporated as Petropavlovsk-Kamchatsky City Under Krai Jurisdiction –an administrative unit with status equal to that of the districts. As a municipal division, Petropavlovsk-Kamchatsky City Under Krai Jurisdiction is incorporated as Petropavlovsk-Kamchatsky Urban Okrug.

=== Russian legislative election results ===
Parties/Year	2003	2007	2011
Communist Party	8.83%	8.89%	17.78%
Patriots of Russia (including former Party of Peace and Unity)	0.35%	2.31%	2.53%
A Just Russia (including former Rodina or Motherland-National Patriotic Union Russian Party of Life People's Party of the Russian Federation and Russian Ecological Party "The Greens")	13.91%	7.41%	9.93%
Yabloko (including former Union of People for education and research: "Партия СЛОН")	8.92%	1.85%	5.10%
Right Cause (including former Citizens' Force Democratic Party of Russia and Union of Rightist Forces)	4.46%	2.74%	0.67%
United Russia (including former Agrarian Party of Russia)	35.29%	61.78%	43.59%
Liberal Democratic Party	15.25%	12.00%	18.40%
Other minor parties	12.12%		
Total	99.13%	96.98%	98%

== Culture and tourism ==
The main association football stadium in Petropavlovsk-Kamchatskiy is the 5,000-capacity Spartak Stadium. The former club FC Volcano played at the stadium. There are multiple museums in the city and it is the main gateway to the rest of Kamchatka.

== Transport ==
The city is served by Elizovo Airport, which is linked to the town and its port via the A-401 road. During the warmer months cruise ships regularly stop there for the day. There is a bus service in the city.

== Demographics ==
Historical population
Year	Pop.	±%
1897	395	—
1926	1,691	+328.1%
1939	35,373	+1991.8%
1959	85,582	+141.9%
1970	153,885	+79.8%
1979	214,977	+39.7%
1989	268,747	+25.0%
2002	198,028	−26.3%
2010	179,780	−9.2%
2021	164,900	−8.3%
Source: Census data

Ethnic Russians make up the majority of the population; the city on its own has more inhabitants than the entire neighboring Chukotka Autonomous Okrug or Magadan Oblast.

The population numbered 179,780 in 2010; 179,800 in 2011; 179,784 in 2012; 181,618 in 2013, and 164,900 in 2021.

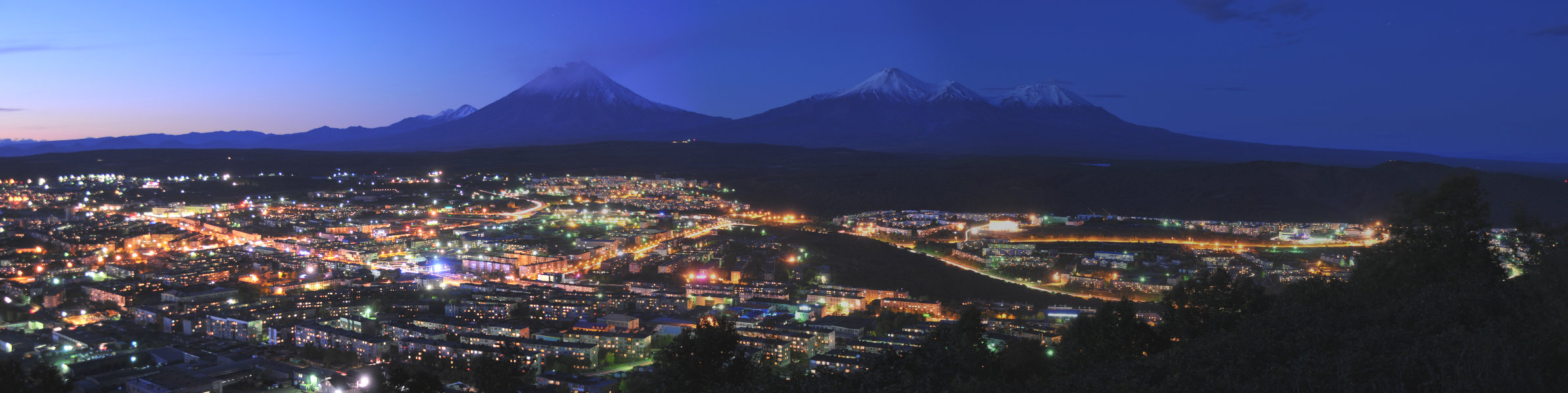
Panorama of Petropavlovsk-Kamchatsky at night

Ethnic composition (2021):

Ethnic group	Population	Percentage
Russians	133,732	91.5%
Ukrainians	2,193	1.5%
Uzbeks	1,386	0.9%
Kyrgyz	1,244	0.9%
Other	7,593	5.2%

== Twin towns – sister cities ==
Petropavlovsk-Kamchatskiy is twinned with:

- Kushiro, Japan (since 1998)
- Unalaska, United States (since 1990)

== Notable people ==
- Artem Ansheles (born 1994), Russian-Hong Kong actor
- Viktor Borel (born 1974), Belarusian footballer and coach
- Lusya Chebotina (born 1997), Russian singer-songwriter
- Aleksandra Frantseva (born 1987), Russian Paralympic alpine skier
- Pavlo Ishchenko (born 1992), Ukrainian-Israeli boxer
- Viktor Maslov (born 1949), Ukrainian footballer and referee
- Anatolii Mohyliov (born 1955), Ukrainian politician
- Innokenty Omulevsky (1836–1883), Russian writer and poet
- Igor Smirnov (born 1941), President of Transnistria from 1991 to 2011
- Regina Sych (born 1987), Russian freestyle swimmer
- Sergei Ursuliak (born 1958), Russian film director
- Elena Yakovishina (born 1992), Russian alpine skier
- Oleg Yerofeyev (1940–2022), Soviet and Russian navy admiral

== See also ==
- Bechevinka, Soviet naval base known by the codename Petropavlovsk-Kamchatsky-54
