= Port of Petropavlovsk-Kamchatskiy =

Port in Petropavlovsk-Kamchatsky, Russia

Port of Petropavlosk-Kamchatskiy
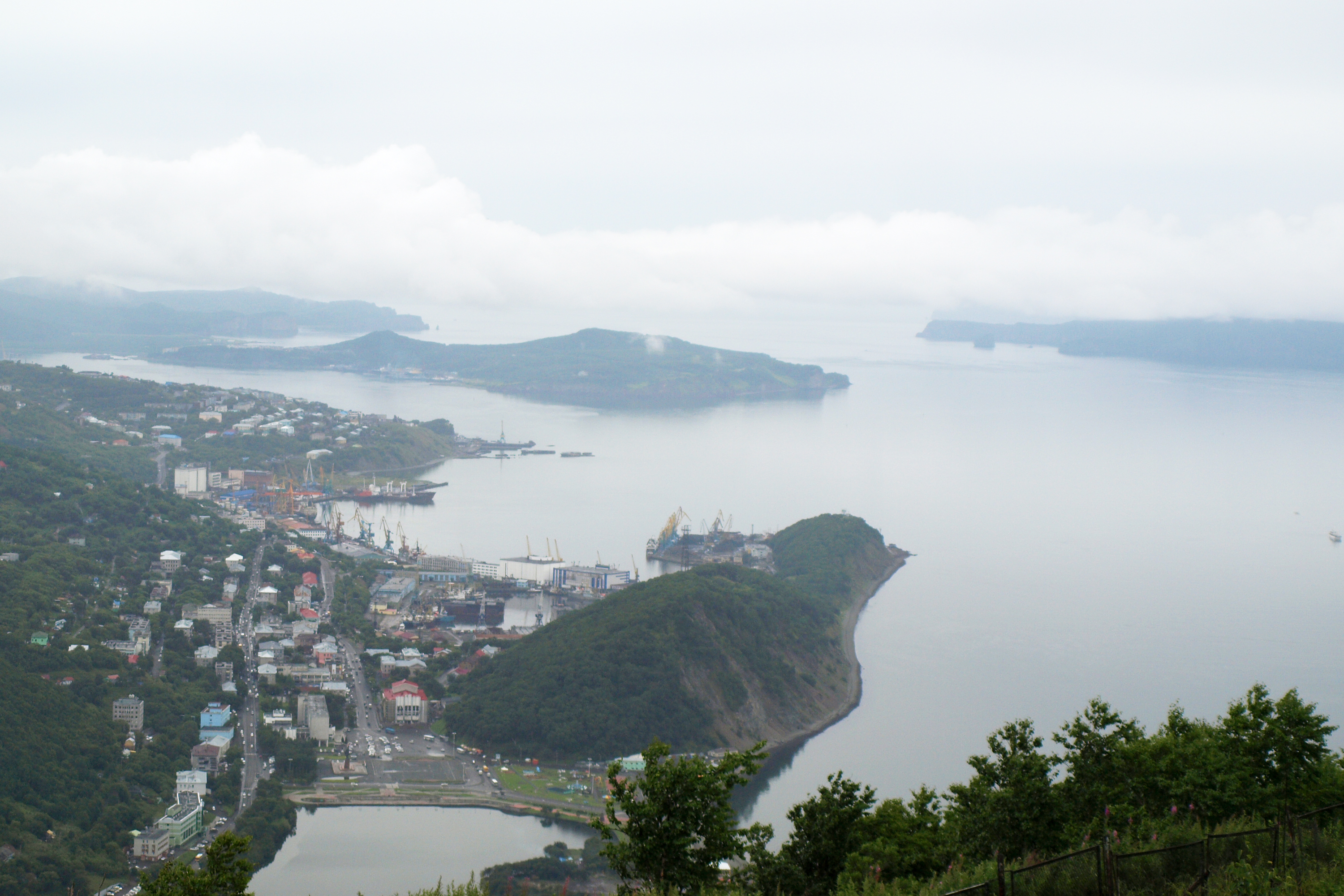
- Interactive map of Port of Petropavlosk-Kamchatskiy

Location
- Country: Russia
- Location: Petropavlovsk-Kamchatsky, Kamchatka Krai
- Coordinates: 53.007°N 158.654°E
- UN/LOCODE: RUPKC

Details
- Opened: 1740

Statistics
- Website https://www.rosmorport.ru/filials/ppv_seaports/

The Port of Petropavlosk-Kamchatskiy (Russian: Морской порт Петропавловск-Камчатский) is a seaport located in Petropavlovsk-Kamchatsky, Russia.

== History ==
In 1963, a passenger terminal building was constructed at the port. This building remains the seaport's gateway to Petropavlovsk-Kamchatsky.

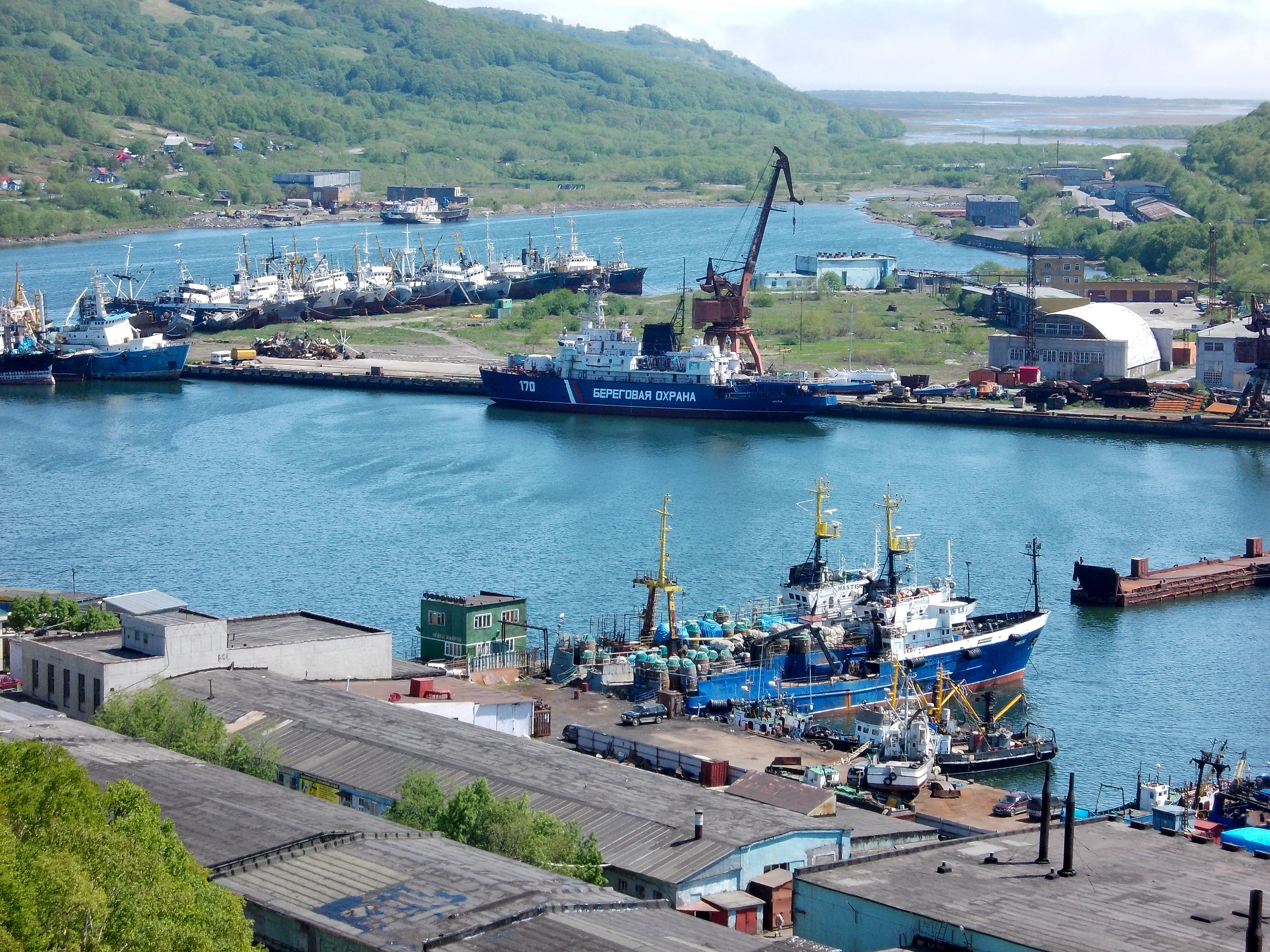
Babya Bay of Avacha Bay, pier of the Petropavlovsk-Kamchatsky ship repair plant (2013).

== Cargo turnover ==
Cabotage cargo predominates in the cargo turnover structure by shipping type. According to results in 2015, the cabotage component of JSC PKMTP's cargo turnover was 89.4%. The total volume of cabotage cargo in physical terms amounted to 883.1 thousand tons (a drop of 115.2 thousand tons compared to 2014).
