= Artem Ansheles =

Hong Kong actor (born 1994)

- Артём Аншелес
- Born: 15 October 1994 (age 32); Petropavlovsk-Kamchatsky, Kamchatka Krai, Russia
- Citizenship: Chinese (Hong Kong)
- Education: Cyprus Academy of Art
- Occupations: TV Host, Actor, Model
- Years active: 2016–present
- Height: 1.83 m (6 ft 0 in)

Artem Ansheles (Russian: Артём Аншелес, romanized: Artyom Ansheles; born 15 October 1994) is a Hong Kong actor, singer and TV host.

He migrated to Hong Kong at age 17 for studies, during which he discovered an opportunity to enter the modeling business. After being a full-time model for over a year, he decided to enroll in Cantonese courses to further expand his opportunities. In 2019, he launched his own ear-hook accessory brand, EARON.

In 2022, Ansheles was awarded ‘Asia’s Most Stylish’ by Tatler. In his interview with Tatler Asia, he said, “Style is the opposite of fashion. While fashion is about blending in, style is about knowing who you are and being able to visualise it, regardless of the trends and ‘norms’.”

== Biography ==
Artem Ansheles was born on the Kamchatka peninsula of Russia in Petropavlovsk-Kamchatsky and moved to Cyprus with his family when he was 10 years old.

As a child, his favourite movies included Stephen Chow's Shaolin Soccer and Chow Yun-fat's Crouching Tiger, Hidden Dragon which has further developed already existing curiosity and admiration towards Chinese culture.

Influenced by his architect father, Ansheles has been interested in design from a very early age. After graduating from Cyprus Academy of Art, he applied into his dream university, Central Saint Martins located in London, but shortly after applying decided to go to Asia instead.

Originally having explored the opportunity to move to Beijing, Ansheles realised that lack of knowledge of Chinese culture and Mandarin would make the stay difficult and instead decided to move to a more international place, Hong Kong.

== Career ==
In 2012, Artem Ansheles began his design studies and after two years was forced to quit due to difficulties, leading to his start of a modeling career. After working as a full-time model for over a year, he decided to enroll into Cantonese Courses to expand his market.

In 2016, Artem Ansheles made his debut as a TV host for a kids programme Joyous alliance that aired on Hong Kong’s free channel ViuTV.

In 2017, he became a host on yet another show Girl's Talk from which he quickly gained popularity as a "sweet guy" who speaks Cantonese. Airing every Monday to Friday the talk show is focused on female audience and includes other hosts such as Scarlett Wong, Bonde Sham and Hailey Chan.

In 2017, Artem Ansheles was invited to take a role of a Ukrainian dancer in drama series Lost in Shell which aired in the first quarter of 2018.

In 2018, Artem Ansheles was invited by Hong Kong Trade and Development Council to host a special TV series to promote the "Belt and Road Initiative". He will join 20 Hong Kong young people aged between 18 and 25 on a trip to China's Xinjiang Uygur Autonomous Region and Kazakhstan in Central Asia through the "Belt and Road Journey" Youth Exchange Programme. The TV show will air on ViuTV in September.

In 2019, Artem Ansheles released his first Cantonese pop song - "Mama Day Day", written and composed by himself.

Parallel to being a TV host, Artem Ansheles also filmed and shared videos about his life in Hong Kong on social media, with his most popular video "Ansheles and mom try Chinese herbal tea" in which he and his mother try traditional Chinese herbal tea, which has been viewed over a million times .

Other popular videos include: "McDull" which also Inviting his friend to try traditional Chinese snake wine in a video "Ansheles give friend try alcohol".

His positive image has attracted collaborations from top brands such as' Samsung Galaxy, M&M's, Asia Miles, Tedx, Hong Kong Jockey Club, HKTDC, UNESCO.

== Languages ==
Due to studying in international school in Cyprus, Artem Ansheles is able to speak fluent English as well as some Greek.

== Filmography ==
=== Television ===
Year	Platform	Title	Chinese Title
2018	ViuTV	Lost in Shell	《迷失假期》

=== Variety show ===
Year	Platform	Title	Role
2016	ViuTV	Joyous Alliance	Host
2017	ViuTV	Girls' Talk	Host
2018	ViuTV	RUS Back Home	Host

=== Others ===
Year	Platform	Title
2017	Yahoo!	獨食男女
