= 2015 IPC Alpine Skiing World Championships =

- Host city: Panorama Mountain Village, British Columbia, Canada
- Nations: 22
- Athletes: 130
- Events: Downhill, giant slalom, slalom, super combined, super-G
- Dates: March 2–10

The 2015 IPC Alpine Skiing World Championships was an international disability sport alpine skiing event held in Panorama Mountain Village, British Columbia, Canada from March 2 to 10, 2015. The Championship is held biannually by the International Paralympic Committee (IPC) and is the largest event of its type outside the Winter Paralympics.

Skiers competed in sitting, standing or visually impaired classification categories in downhill, giant slalom, slalom, super-G, super combined and team events.

Over 130 skiers competed, with Russia finishing the championship on top of the medal table in both gold medals won and total medals.

This proved to be the last event under the title of "IPC Alpine Skiing World Championships". On 30 November 2016, the IPC, which serves as the international governing body for 10 disability sports, including Alpine skiing, adopted the "World Para" branding for all of those sports. The world championships in said sports were immediately rebranded as "World Para" events. Accordingly, from 2017 forward, the event will be known as the "World Para Alpine Skiing Championships".

== Opening ceremony ==
On March 2, the opening ceremony was held.

== Events ==
=== Men ===
Event	Date	Class	Gold	Time	Silver	Time	Bronze	Time
Downhill	Mar 4	Visually impaired	Mac Marcoux; Guide: B.J. Marcoux; Canada	1:29.68	Mark Bathum; Guide: Cade Yamamoto; United States	1:31.89	Miroslav Haraus; Guide: Maris Hudik; Slovakia	1:32.12
Downhill	Mar 4	Standing	Alexey Bugaev; Russia	1:27.60	Matthias Lanzinger; Austria	1:29.71	Alexander Vetrov; Russia	1:31.25
Downhill	Mar 4	Sitting	Corey Peters; New Zealand	1:28.06	Roman Rabl; Austria	1:28.80	Taiki Morii; Japan	1:29.26
Super-G	Mar 5	Visually impaired	Ivan Frantsev; Guide: German Agranovskii; Russia	1:23.63	Mac Marcoux; Guide: B.J. Marcoux; Canada	1:24.04	Miroslav Haraus; Guide: Maris Hudik; Slovakia	1:24.81
Super-G	Mar 5	Standing	Alexey Bugaev; Russia	1:19.88	Matthias Lanzinger; Austria	1:21.55	Thomas Pfyl; Switzerland	1:21.91
Super-G	Mar 5	Sitting	Corey Peters; New Zealand	1:20.41	Frederic Francois; France	1:21.20	Andrew Earl Kurka; United States	1:21.32
Super combined	Mar 7	Visually impaired	Miroslav Haraus; Guide: Maris Hudik; Slovakia	1:59.81	Ivan Frantsev; Guide: German Agranovskii; Russia	2:01.35	Yon Santacana Maiztegui; Guide: Miguel Galindo Garces; Spain	2:03.32
Super combined	Mar 7	Standing	Alexey Bugaev; Russia	1:54.46	Markus Salcher; Switzerland	1:56.94	Matthias Lanzinger; Austria	1:56.96
Super combined	Mar 7	Sitting	Georg Kreiter; Germany	1:56.84	Roman Rabl; Austria	1.57.70	Frederic Francois; France	1:58.39
Giant slalom	Mar 8	Visually impaired	Valerii Redkozubov; Guide: Evgeny Geroev; Russia	2:09.28	Yon Santacana Maiztegui; Guide: Miguel Galindo Garces; Spain	2:09.88	Patrik Hetmer; Guide: Miroslav Macala; Czech Republic	2:11.71
Giant slalom	Mar 8	Standing	Alexey Bugaev; Russia	2:01.19	Markus Salcher; Switzerland	2:02.16	Matthias Lanzinger; Austria	2:04.27
Giant slalom	Mar 8	Sitting	Georg Kreiter; Germany	2:03.49	Corey Peters; New Zealand	2:03.89	Taiki Morii; Japan	2:04.71
Slalom	Mar 10	Visually impaired	Valerii Redkozubov; Guide: Evgeny Geroev; Russia	1:47.71	Miroslav Haraus; Guide: Maris Hudik; Slovakia	1:48.90	Yon Santacana Maiztegui; Guide: Miguel Galindo Garces; Spain	1:53.05
Slalom	Mar 10	Standing	Alexey Bugaev; Russia	1:39.05	Alexander Alyabyev; Russia	1:46.15	Matt Hallat; Canada	1:47.86
Slalom	Mar 10	Sitting	Takeshi Suzuki; Japan	1:47.93	Taiki Morii; Japan	1:53.67	Thomas Nolte; Germany	1:55.38

=== Women ===
Event	Date	Class	Gold	Time	Silver	Time	Bronze	Time
Downhill	Mar 4	Visually impaired	Melissa Perrine; Guide: Andrew Bor; Australia	1:45.80	Danelle Umstead; Guide: Robert Umstead; United States	1:46.32	Aleksandra Frantceva; Guide: Semen Pliaskin; Russia	1:51.57
Downhill	Mar 4	Standing	Marie Bochet; France	1:32.81	Andrea Rothfuss; Germany	1:36.83	Mariia Papulova; Russia	1:42.12
Downhill	Mar 4	Sitting	Claudia Loesch; Austria	1:33.29	Momoka Muraoka; Japan	1:35.95	Anna Schaffelhuber; Germany	1:38.06
Super-G	Mar 5	Visually impaired	Melissa Perrine; Guide: Andrew Bor; Australia	1:33.52	Danelle Umstead; Guide: Robert Umstead; United States	1:37.55	Aleksandra Frantceva; Guide: Semen Pliaskin; Russia	1:40.55
Super-G	Mar 5	Standing	Marie Bochet; France	1:24.77	Andrea Rothfuss; Germany	1:28.83	Mariia Papulova; Russia	1:33.60
Super-G	Mar 5	Sitting	Anna Schaffelhuber; Germany	1:27.65	—N/a		—N/a	
Super combined	Mar 7	Visually impaired	Melissa Perrine; Guide: Andrew Bor; Australia	2:14.18	Aleksandra Frantceva; Guide: Semen Pliaskin; Russia	2:16.95	Danelle Umstead; Guide: Robert Umstead; United States	2:22.20
Super combined	Mar 7	Standing	Marie Bochet; France	2:03.17	Andrea Rothfuss; Germany	2:09.58	Anna Jochemsen; Netherlands	2:12.52
Super combined	Mar 7	Sitting	Claudia Loesch; Austria	2:04.79	Anna Schaffelhuber; Germany	2:06.10	Laurie Stephens; United States	2:17.78
Giant slalom	Mar 8	Visually impaired	Aleksandra Frantceva; Guide: Semen Pliaskin; Russia	2:24.05	Millie Knight; Guide: Jen Kehoe; Great Britain	2:24.39	Melissa Perrine; Guide: Andrew Bor; Australia	2:25.41
Giant slalom	Mar 8	Standing	Marie Bochet; France	2:11.63	Andrea Rothfuss; Germany	2:14.04	Stephanie Jallen; United States	2:20.49
Giant slalom	Mar 8	Sitting	Anna Schaffelhuber; Germany	1:09.50	Claudia Loesch; Austria	1:11.38	Momoka Muraoka; Japan	1:15.44
Slalom	Mar 10	Visually impaired	Aleksandra Frantceva; Guide: Semen Pliaskin; Russia	2:03.31	Melissa Perrine; Guide: Andrew Bor; Australia	2:04.50	Millie Knight; Guide: Jen Kehoe; Great Britain	2:13.81
Slalom	Mar 10	Standing	Marie Bochet; France	1:58.67	Mariia Papulova; Russia	2:04.22	Laura Valeanu; Romania	2:09.55
Slalom	Mar 10	Sitting	Claudia Loesch; Austria	2:03.28	Anna Schaffelhuber; Germany	2:03.38	Anna-Lena Forster; Germany	2:04.31

== Medals table ==
Key

The host country is highlighted in lavender blue

Rank	Nation	Gold	Silver	Bronze	Total
1	Russia (RUS)	10	4	5	19
2	France (FRA)	5	1	1	7
3	Germany (GER)	4	6	3	13
4	Austria (AUT)	3	7	2	12
5	Australia (AUS)	3	1	1	5
6	New Zealand (NZL)	2	1	0	3
7	Japan (JPN)	1	2	3	6
8	Slovakia (SVK)	1	1	2	4
9	Canada (CAN)*	1	1	1	3
10	United States (USA)	0	3	4	7
11	Spain (ESP)	0	1	2	3
12	Great Britain (GBR)	0	1	1	2
13	Czech Republic (CZE)	0	0	1	1
13	Netherlands (NED)	0	0	1	1
13	Romania (ROU)	0	0	1	1
13	Switzerland (SUI)	0	0	1	1
Totals (16 entries)		30	29	29	88

== Participating nations ==
Over 130 participants from 22 nations competed.

- Australia
- Austria
- Belgium
- Canada
- Croatia
- Czech Republic
- France
- Greece
- Germany
- Great Britain
- Italy
- Japan
- Netherlands
- New Zealand
- Poland
- Romania
- Russia
- Slovakia
- Slovenia
- Spain
- Switzerland
- United States

== Classifications ==
Skiers compete in sitting, standing or visually impaired events, depending on their classification of disability.

Standing

- LW2 – single leg amputation above the knee
- LW3 – double leg amputation below the knee, mild cerebral palsy, or equivalent impairment
- LW4 – single leg amputation below the knee
- LW5/7 – double arm amputation
- LW6/8 – single arm amputation
- LW9 – amputation or equivalent impairment of one arm and one leg

Sitting

- LW 10 – paraplegia with no or some upper abdominal function and no functional sitting balance
- LW 11 – paraplegia with fair functional sitting balance
- LW 12 – double leg amputation above the knees, or paraplegia with some leg function and good sitting balance

Visually impaired

- B1 – no functional vision
- B2 – up to ca 3–5% functional vision
- B3 – under 10% functional vision
