= Philipp Bonadimann =

Austria para-alpine skier (born 1980)

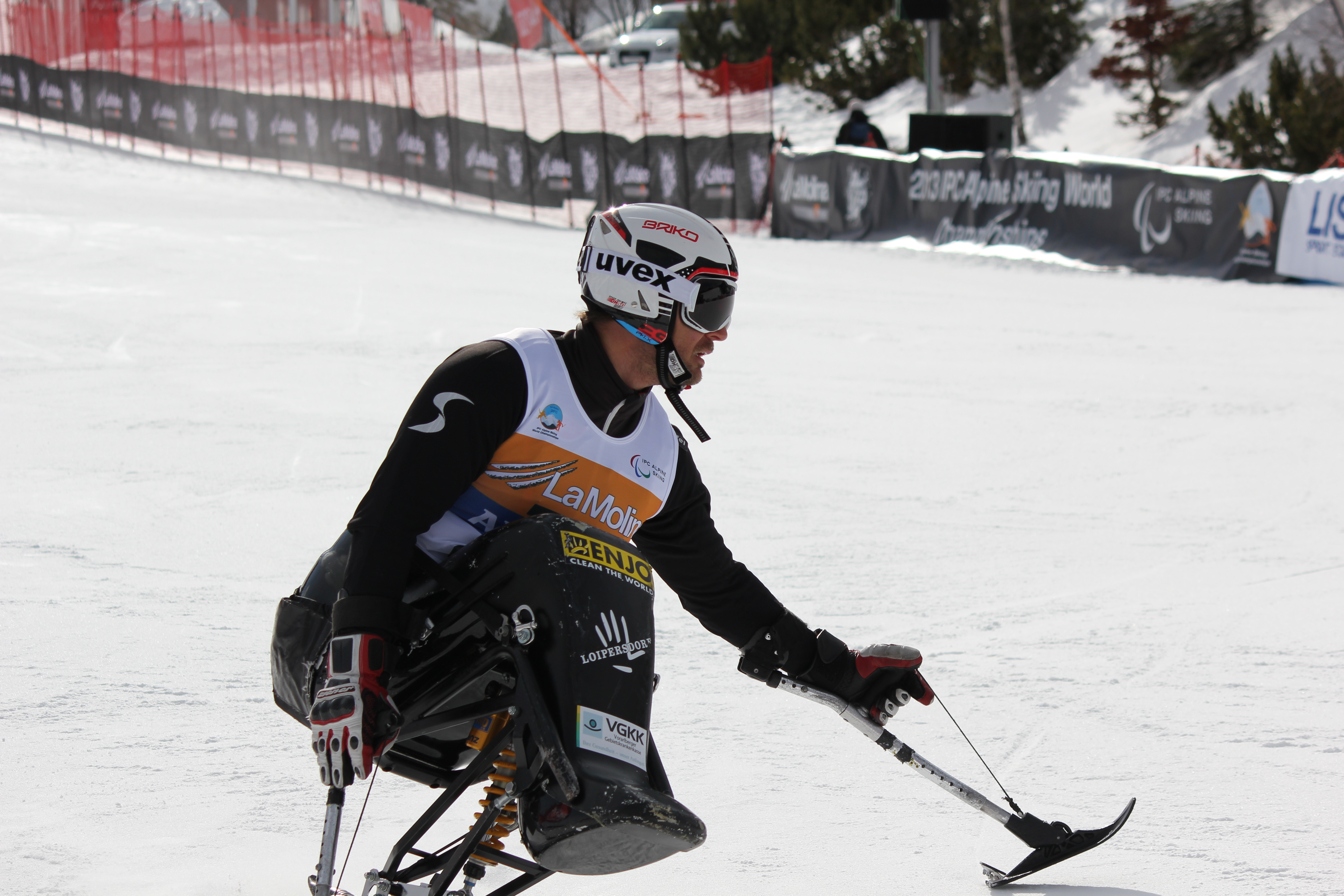
- Bonadimann at the 2013 IPC World Championships

Personal information
- Born: 24 July 1980 (age 45) Feldkirch, Austria

Sport
- Country: Austria
- Sport: Alpine skiing
- Event(s): Downhill; Slalom; Giant slalom Super combined Super-G
- Club: RC ENJO Vorarlberg
- Coached by: Manuel Hujara (national)
Medal record
Men's alpine skiing
Representing Austria
Paralympic Games
Silver medal – second place	2014 Sochi	Slalom, sitting
Bronze medal – third place	2010 Vancouver	Super combined, sitting
Bronze medal – third place	2010 Vancouver	Slalom, sitting
IPC Alpine Skiing World Championships
Gold medal – first place	2013 La Molina	Slalom, sitting
Bronze medal – third place	2013 La Molina	Super combined, sitting

Philipp Bonadimann (born 24 July 1980) is an Austrian alpine skier who won competed in two Winter Paralympics winning three medals in sitting events. for Austria at the 2010 Winter Paralympics. He made his skiing debut in 2005 and besides skiing he competes in handcycling. Bonadimann has represented Austria at both the 2010 and 2014 Winter Paralympics and was his country's flag bearer at the opening ceremony at the 2014 Games in Sochi.
