= 2013 IPC Alpine Skiing World Championships =

- Host city: La Molina, Spain
- Nations: 29
- Athletes: 118
- Events: Downhill, giant slalom, slalom, super combined, super-G
- Dates: 18–27 February 2013

The 2013 IPC Alpine Skiing World Championships was an international disability sport alpine skiing event held in La Molina ski resort in Spain from 18 to 27 February 2013. The Championship is held biennially by the International Paralympic Committee (IPC) and is the largest event of its type outside the Winter Paralympics.

Skiers competed in sitting, standing or visually impaired classification categories in Downhill, giant slalom, Slalom, Super-G, Super Combined and Team events.

Over 118 skiers competed, with France finishing the Championship on top of the medal table with the most gold medals and Canada finishing with the highest total medals won (14).

== Opening ceremony ==
The opening ceremony was held on the 18 February.

== Events ==
=== Men ===
Event	Date	Class	Gold	Time	Silver	Time	Bronze	Time
Downhill	Feb 20	Visually impaired	Yon Santacana Maiztegui; Guide: M. Galidno Garces; Spain	1:25.14	Alessandro Daldoss; Guide: Davide Riva; Italy	1:26.80	Chris Williamson; Guide: Robin Femy; Canada	1:27.77
Downhill	Feb 20	Standing	Markus Salcher; Austria	1:29.74	Michael Bruegger; Switzerland	1:32.51	Matthias Lanzinger; Austria	1:33.80
Downhill	Feb 20	Sitting	Franz Hanfstingl; Germany	1:31.92	Stephen Lawler; United States	1:32.58	Yohann Taberlet; France	1:32.77
Super-G	Feb 21	Visually impaired	Yon Santacana Maiztegui; Guide: M. Galidno Garces; Spain	1:10.49	Chris Williamson; Guide: Robin Femy; Canada	1:11.65	Hugo Thomas; Guide: Luana Bergamin; Switzerland	1:12.78
Super-G	Feb 21	Standing	Markus Salcher; Austria	1:12.49	Matthias Lanzinger; Austria	1:13.66	Michael Bruegger; Switzerland	1:14.82
Super-G	Feb 21	Sitting	Taiki Morii; Japan	1:13.49	Yohann Taberlet; France	1:13.50	Akira Kano; Japan	1:13.69
Slalom	Feb 24	Visually impaired	Ivan Frantsev; Guide: German Agranovskii; Russia	1:57.94	Miroslav Haraus; Guide: Maria Zatovicova; Slovakia	1:59.21	Valery Redkozubov; Guide: V. Molodtsov; Russia	2:00.11
Slalom	Feb 24	Standing	Vincent Gauthier-Manuel; France	1:55.85	Thomas Pfyl; Switzerland	1:57.30	Adam Hall; New Zealand	1:57.69
Slalom	Feb 24	Sitting	Philipp Bonadimann; Austria	1:58.52	Taiki Morii; Japan	2:02.67	Dietmar Dorn; Austria	2:05.46
Super combined	Feb 25	Visually impaired	Chris Williamson; Guide: Robin Femy; Canada	1:43.47	Miroslav Haraus; Guide: Maria Zatovicova; Slovakia	1:45.02	Ivan Frantsev; Guide: German Agranovskii; Russia	1:47.90
Super combined	Feb 25	Standing	Matthias Lanzinger; Austria	1:42.44	Alexey Bugaev; Russia	1:42.90	Cedric Amafroi-Broisat; France	1:44.89
Super combined	Feb 25	Sitting	Taiki Morii; Japan	1:44.74	Takeshi Suzuki; Japan	1:47.37	Philipp Bonadimann; Austria	1:47.58
Giant slalom	Feb 26	Visually impaired	Yon Santacana Maiztegui; Guide: M. Galidno Garces; Spain	2:12.32	Mac Marcoux; Guide: B. J. Marcoux; Canada	2:13.59	Chris Williamson; Guide: Robin Femy; Canada	2:13.87
Giant slalom	Feb 26	Standing	Vincent Gauthier-Manuel; France	2:09.02	Alexey Bugaev; Russia	2:09.61	Michael Bruegger; Switzerland	2:11.50
Giant slalom	Feb 26	Sitting	Taiki Morii; Japan	2:15.80	Takeshi Suzuki; Japan	2:20.12	Christoph Kunz; Switzerland	2:20.26

=== Women ===
Event	Date	Class	Gold	Time	Silver	Time	Bronze	Time
Downhill	Feb 20	Visually impaired	Henrieta Farkasova; Guide: Natalia Subrtova; Slovakia	1:33.11	Aleksandra Frantceva; Guide: Pavel Zabotin; Russia	1:34.63	Kelly Gallagher; Guide: Charlotte Evans; Great Britain	1:51.57
Downhill	Feb 20	Standing	Marie Bochet; France	1:35.62	Andrea Rothfuss; Germany	1:37.23	Solene Jambaque; France	1:38.52
Downhill	Feb 20	Sitting	Laurie Stephens; United States	1:41.07	Kimberly Joines; Canada	1:41.37	Anna Schaffelhuber; Germany	1:44.17
Super-G	Feb 21	Visually impaired	Alexandra Frantseva; Guide: Pavel Zabotin; Russia	1:18.20	Kelly Gallagher; Guide: Charlotte Evans; Great Britain	1:21.30;	Jade Etherington; Guide: John Clark; Great Britain	1:21.58
Super-G	Feb 21	Standing	Marie Bochet; France	1:18.94	Solene Jambaque; France	1:19.29	Inga Medvedeva; Russia	1:20.99
Super-G	Feb 21	Sitting	Claudia Loesch; Austria	1:18.86	Anna Schaffelhuber; Germany	1:22.65	Laurie Stephens; United States	1:23.33
Slalom	Feb 24	Visually impaired	Henrieta Farkasova; Guide: Natalia Subrtova; Slovakia	2:08.82	Alexandra Frantseva; Guide: Pavel Zabotin; Russia	2:10.49	Viviane Forest; Guide: C. Lauzon-Gauthier; Canada	2:13.60
Slalom	Feb 24	Standing	Marie Bochet; France	2:04.98	Andrea Rothfuss; Germany	2:11.80	Alexandra Starker; Canada	2:13.65
Slalom	Feb 24	Sitting	Anna Schaffelhuber; Germany	2:26.18	Anna-Lena Forster; Germany	2:31.31	Kimberly Joines; Canada	2:32.76
Super combined	Feb 25	Visually impaired	Alexandra Frantseva; Guide: Pavel Zabotin; Russia	1:56.21	Kelly Gallagher; Guide: Charlotte Evans; Great Britain	1:58.81	Petra Kozickova; Guide: Tomas Hajek; Slovakia	2:04.63
Super combined	Feb 25	Standing	Marie Bochet; France	1:55.32	Andrea Rothfuss; Germany	1:57.23	Alexandra Starker; Canada	2:00.49
Super combined	Feb 25	Sitting	Claudia Loesch; Austria	2:04.29	Kimberly Joines; Canada	2:07.51	Anna Schaffelhuber; Germany	2:08.05
Giant slalom	Feb 26	Visually impaired	Aleksandra Frantceva; Guide: Pavel Zabotin; Russia	2:27.57	Viviane Forest; Guide: C. Lauzon-Gauthier; Canada	2:27.81	Kelly Gallagher; Guide: Charlotte Evans; Great Britain	2:29.07
Giant slalom	Feb 26	Standing	Marie Bochet; France	2:21.61	Andrea Rothfuss; Germany	2:22.95	Alexandra Starker; Canada	2:28.26
Giant slalom	Feb 26	Sitting	Claudia Loesch; Austria	2:29.70	Anna Schaffelhuber; Germany	2:31.23	Kimberly Joines; Canada	2:38.40

== Medals table ==
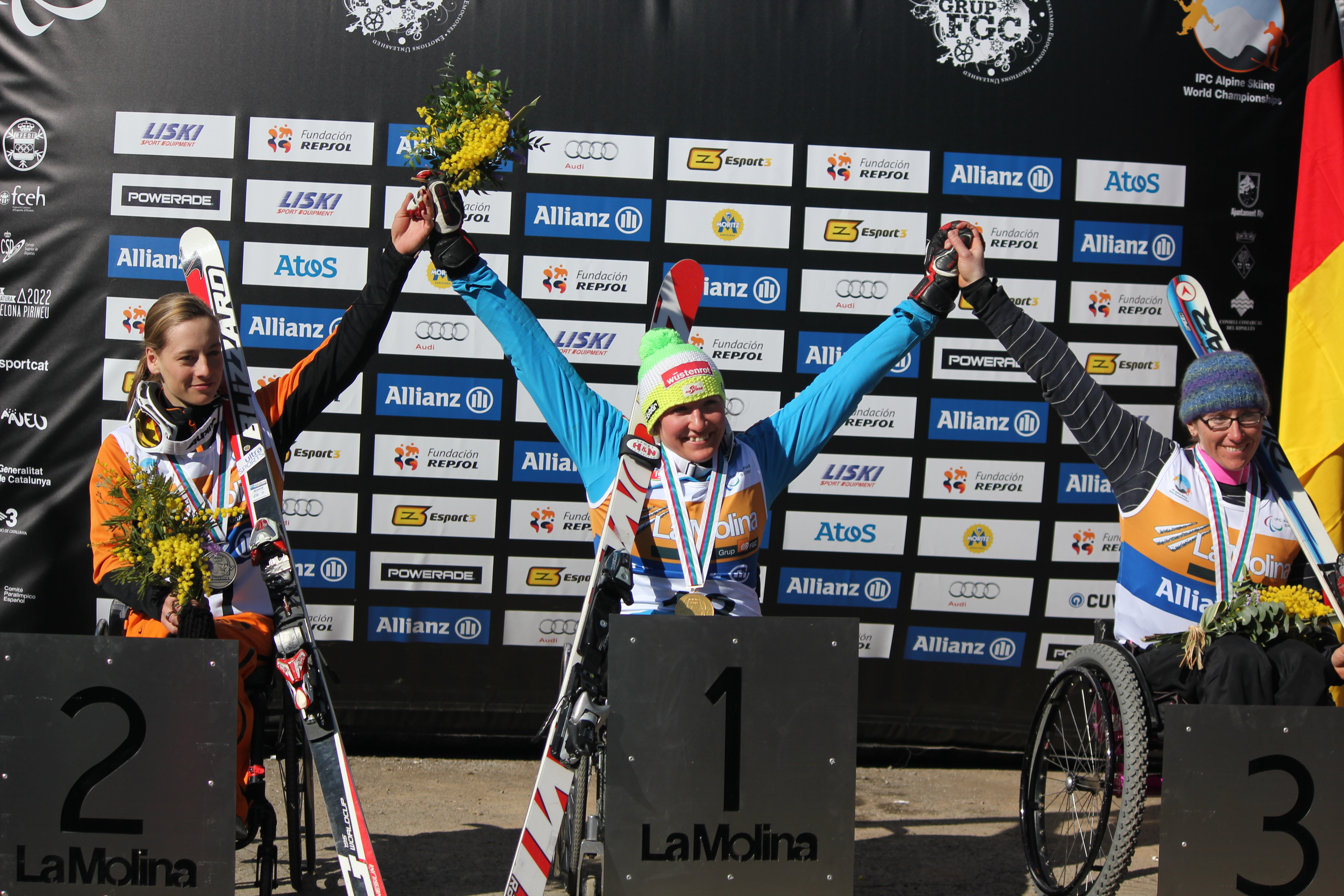
Claudia Loesch (gold), Anna Schaffelhuber (silver) and Laurie Stephens (bronze), medalists of the sitting Super-G event

* Host nation (Spain)

Rank	Nation	Gold	Silver	Bronze	Total
1	France (FRA)	7	2	3	12
2	Austria (AUT)	7	1	3	11
3	Russia (RUS)	4	4	3	11
4	Japan (JPN)	3	3	1	7
5	Spain (ESP)*	3	0	0	3
6	Germany (GER)	2	7	2	11
7	Slovakia (SVK)	2	2	1	5
8	Canada (CAN)	1	5	8	14
9	United States (USA)	1	1	1	3
10	Switzerland (SUI)	0	2	4	6
11	Great Britain (GBR)	0	2	3	5
12	Italy (ITA)	0	1	0	1
13	New Zealand (NZL)	0	0	1	1
Totals (13 entries)		30	30	30	90

== Participating nations ==
Over 118 participants from 29 nations competed.

- Australia
- Austria
- Belgium
- Canada
- Croatia
- Czech Republic
- France
- Greece
- Germany
- Great Britain
- Italy
- Japan
- Netherlands
- New Zealand
- Poland
- Romania
- Russia
- Slovakia
- Slovenia
- Spain
- Switzerland
- United States

== Classifications ==
Skiers compete in sitting, standing or visually impaired events, depending on their classification of disability.

Standing

- LW2 – single leg amputation above the knee
- LW3 – double leg amputation below the knee, mild cerebral palsy, or equivalent impairment
- LW4 – single leg amputation below the knee
- LW5/7 – double arm amputation
- LW6/8 – single arm amputation
- LW9 – amputation or equivalent impairment of one arm and one leg

Sitting

- LW 10 – paraplegia with no or some upper abdominal function and no functional sitting balance
- LW 11 – paraplegia with fair functional sitting balance
- LW 12 – double leg amputation above the knees, or paraplegia with some leg function and good sitting balance

Visually impaired

- B1 – no functional vision
- B2 – up to ca 3–5% functional vision
- B3 – under 10% functional vision
