= Thomas Pfyl =

Swiss para-alpine skier (born 1987)

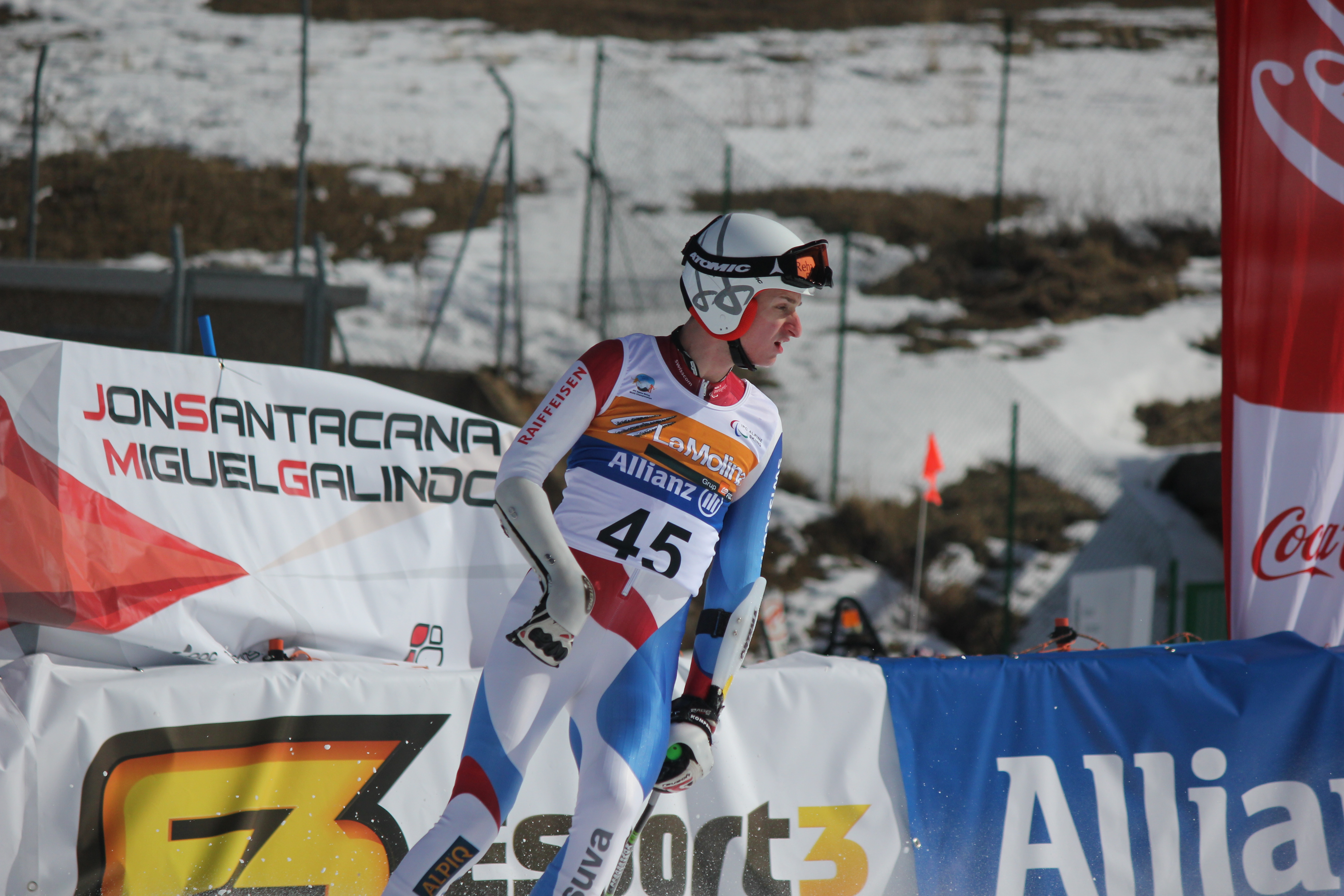
- Pfyl at the 2013 World Championships

Personal information
- Nationality: Swiss
- Born: 1 January 1987 (age 39) Switzerland
- Website: www.thomaspfyl.ch

Sport
- Country: Switzerland
- Sport: Alpine skiing
- Event(s): Downhill slalom Giant slalom Super combined Super G
Medal record
Men's para alpine skiing
Representing Switzerland
Paralympic Games
Silver medal – second place	2006 Turin	Slalom, standing
Bronze medal – third place	2006 Turin	Giant slalom, standing
World Championships
Silver medal – second place	2013 La Molina	Slalom, standing
Bronze medal – third place	2015 Panorama	Super-G, standing

Thomas Pfyl (born 1 January 1987) is a Swiss alpine skier and Paralympian.

He competed in the 2006 Winter Paralympics in Turin, Italy. He won a silver medal in the Slalom, and a bronze medal in the Giant slalom, standing. He became 8th at the Downhill and 4th at the Super-G, standing.

He competed in the 2010 Winter Paralympics in Vancouver, British Columbia, Canada, and became 10th in the Super combined, 7th in the Giant slalom, 8th in the Downhill and 7th in the Slalom, standing.

Pfyl was the flag bearer for Switzerland at the 2010 Paralympic Games in Vancouver, British Columbia, Canada.
