= Kimberly Joines =

Canadian para-alpine skier (born 1981)

Personal information
- Born: 27 January 1981 (age 45) Edmonton, Alberta, Canada

Sport
- Country: Canada
- Event: Alpine skiing
- Coached by: Jean-Sebastien Labrie
Medal record
Women's Alpine skiing
Representing Canada
Paralympic Games
Bronze medal – third place	2006 Turin	Women's super-G, sitting
Bronze medal – third place	2014 Sochi	Women's slalom, sitting
IPC Alpine Skiing World Championships
Bronze medal – third place	2004 Wildschönau	Downhill, sitting
Gold medal – first place	2009 Jeongseon	Downhill, sitting
Gold medal – first place	2009 Jeongseon	Super-G, sitting
Silver medal – second place	2009 Jeongseon	Slalom, sitting
Silver medal – second place	2013 La Molina	Downhill, sitting
Silver medal – second place	2013 La Molina	Super combined, sitting
Bronze medal – third place	2013 La Molina	Slalom, standing
Bronze medal – third place	2013 La Molina	Giant slalom, standing

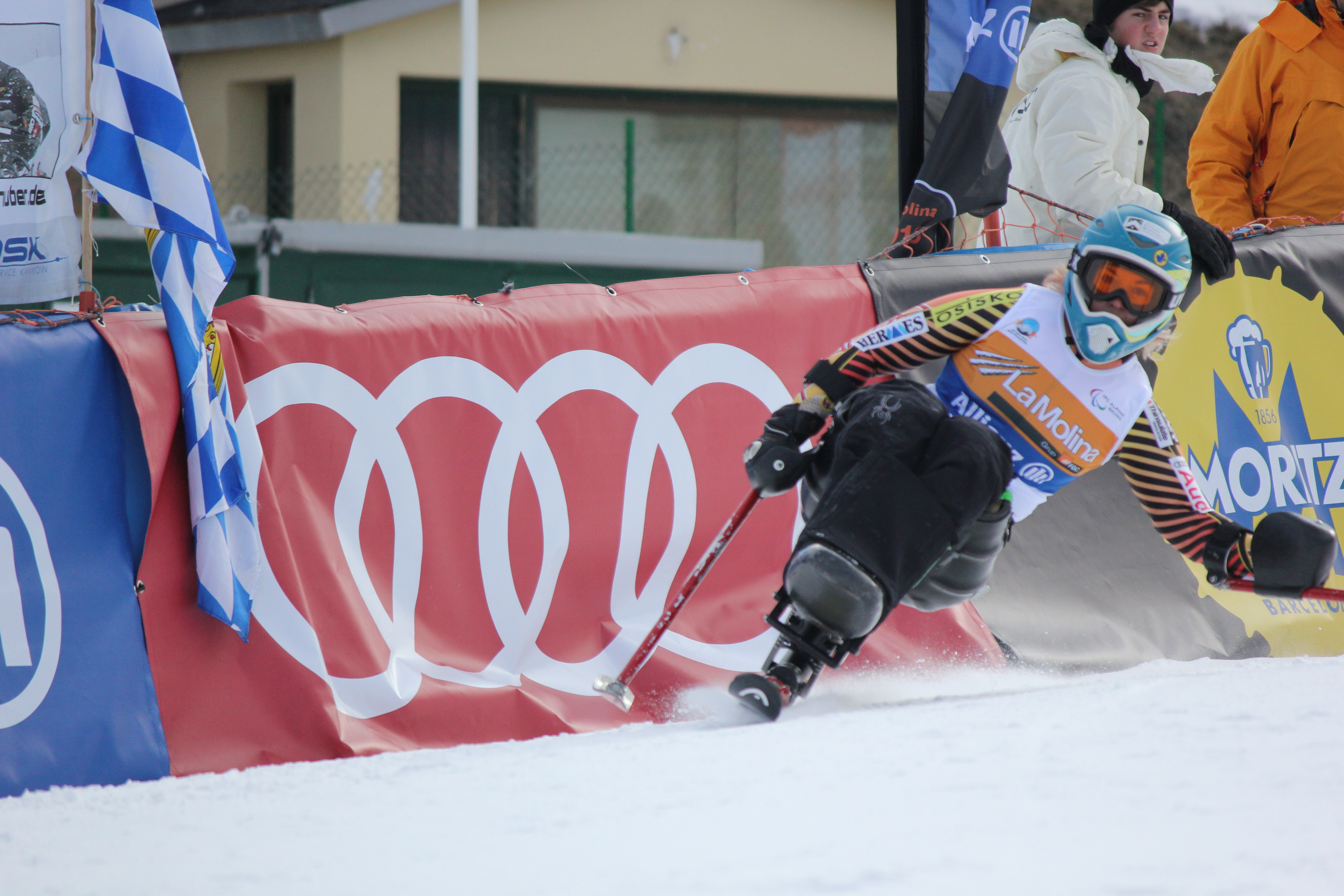
Kimberly Joines at the 2013 IPC Alpine World Championships at La Molina in Spain.

Kimberly Joines (born January 27, 1981, in Edmonton) is a Canadian alpine skier. While snowboarding in the year 2000 Kimberly was involved in a snowboarding accident. The accident resulted in spinal cord injuries at the L1/T12 vertebra and consequently she is paralysed from the waist down. She subsequently joined the Canadian para-alpine ski team. She competed in the 2010 Vancouver Paralympics in five events: Downhill (women’s sitting), Super G (Women’s sitting), Super combined (Women’s sitting), giant slalom (Women’s sitting) and Slalom (Women’s sitting).

Joines won a bronze medal at the Torino Paralympic games in 2006. She was suspended in 2007 after being tested positive for marijuana. She also competed in wheelchair basketball at the 2004 Paralympic Games in Athens.

She won Bronze in the Women's slalom, sitting at the 2014 Winter Paralympics.

== External sources ==
- Kimberly Joines's Official Website
- Canadian Paralympic Association
