= Matthias Lanzinger =

Austrian alpine skier (born 1980)

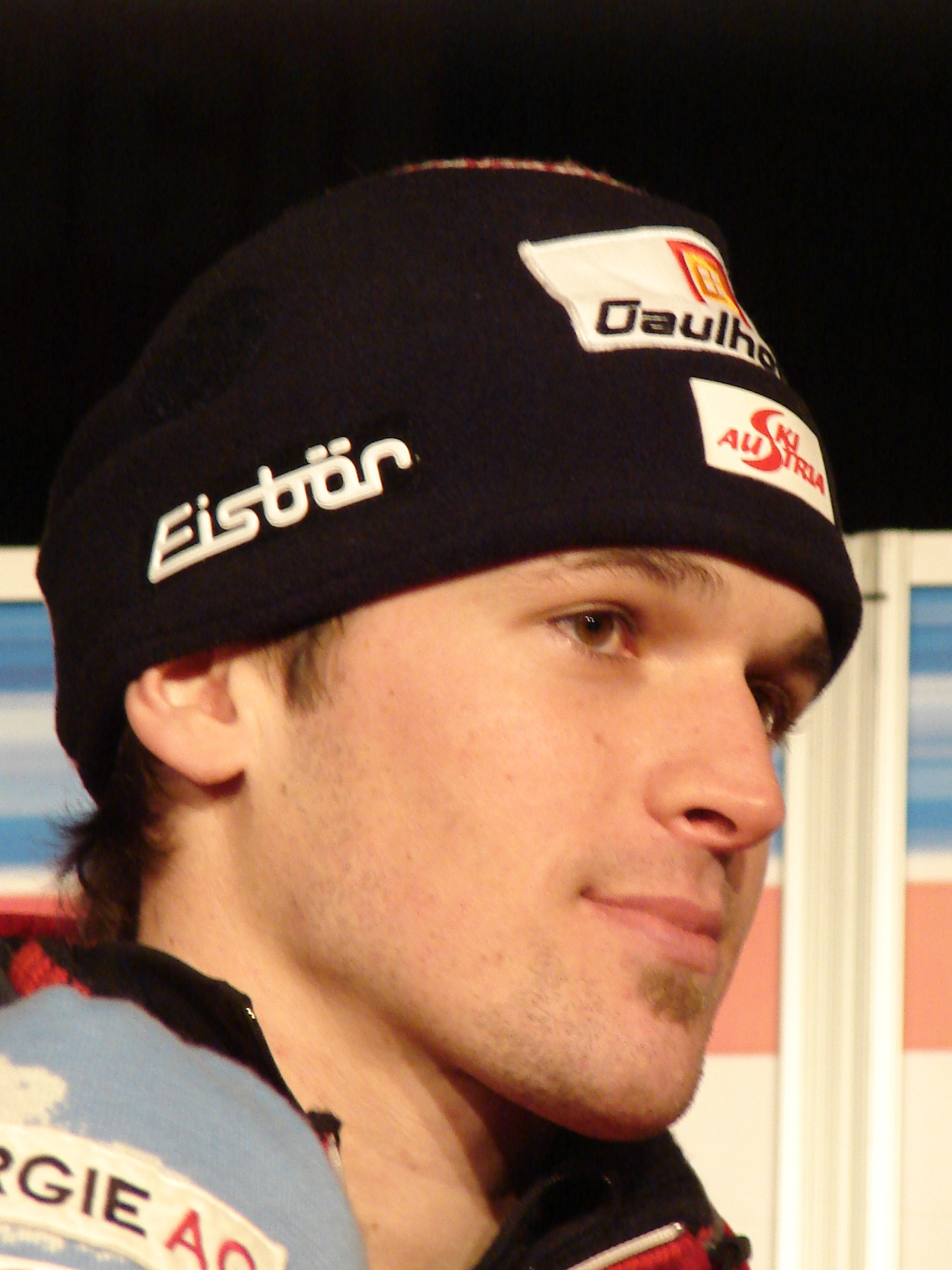

Medal record

Men's alpine skiing

Representing Austria

European Championships
| Gold medal – first place | 2007 Europa Cup | overall |

Paralympic Games
| Silver medal – second place | 2014 Sochi | Super-G, standing |
| Silver medal – second place | 2014 Sochi | Combined, standing |

IPC Alpine Skiing World Championships
| Silver medal – second place | 2013 La Molina | Super combined, standing |
| Silver medal – second place | 2015 Panorama | Downhill, standing |
| Silver medal – second place | 2015 Panorama | Super-G, standing |
| Bronze medal – third place | 2013 La Molina | Downhill, standing |
| Bronze medal – third place | 2015 Panorama | Giant slalom, standing |

Matthias Lanzinger (born 9 December 1980) is an Austrian retired alpine skier from Abtenau, Salzburg.

In 2000 he was the Junior World Champion, and took the overall Europa Cup title in 2004. He finished third in the Super-G World Cup at Beaver Creek on 1 December 2005. This was his only podium in the World Cup. Following his accident and leg amputation, he became a Paralympian.

== Leg amputation after fall ==
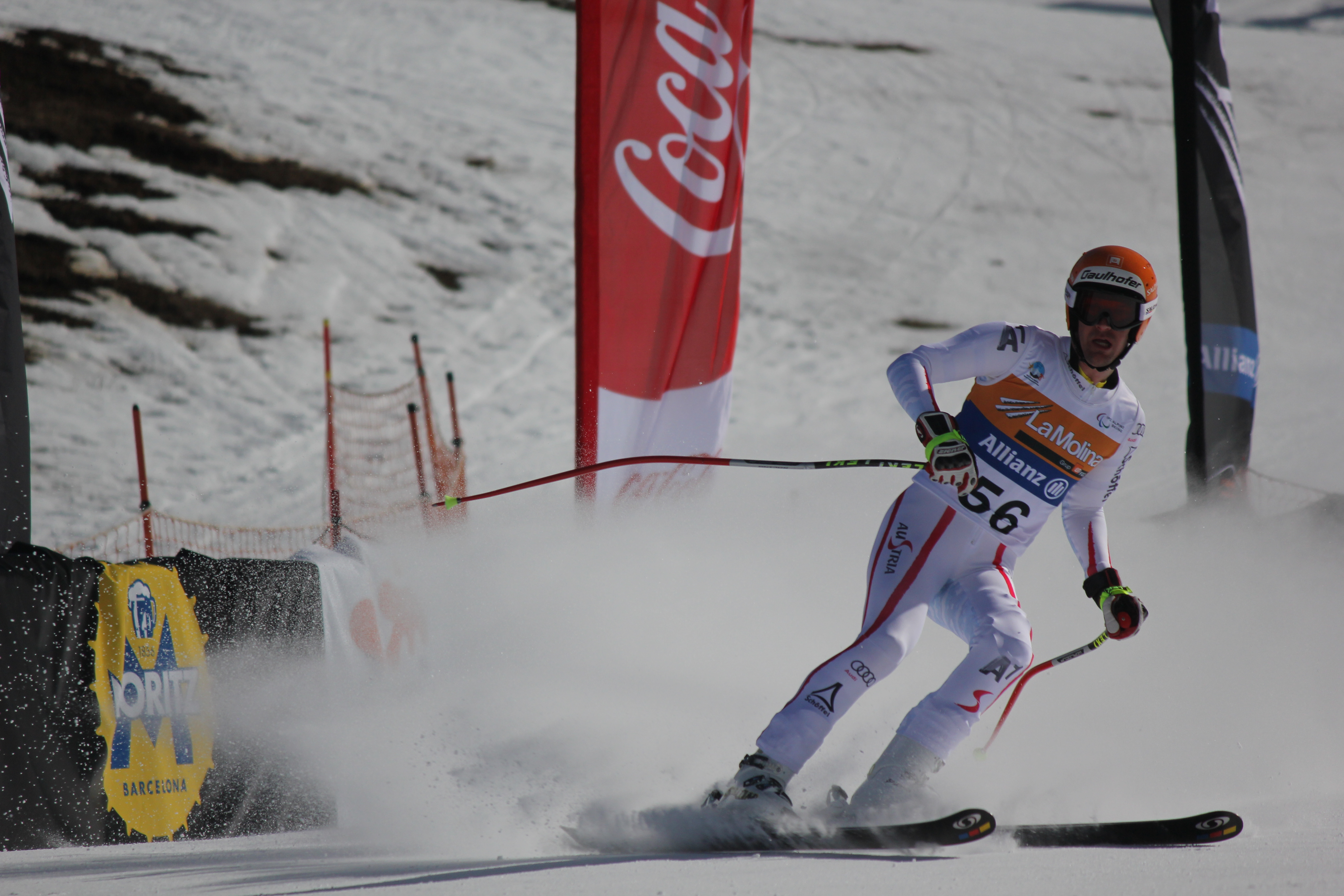
Matthias Lanzinger in the super-G event at the 2013 IPC Alpine World Championships

On Sunday 2 March 2008, during a World Cup Super-G run at Kvitfjell in Norway, Lanzinger crashed into a gate, tumbling down the steep slope. A contributing factor to the severity of the injury was that the release mechanism on one of his ski bindings did not trigger immediately. The reason therefore was that his leg, already broken, did not provide the resistance needed to open the mechanism. He sustained an open fracture of one leg. He was first transported off the slope using a sled, then flown using a private helicopter (quickly refitted to allow his transport) first to Lillehammer hospital where surgery was performed, then on to Ullevål University Hospital in Oslo by ambulance helicopter for a new surgery due to problems with the blood circulation in the leg. On Tuesday morning, after the third surgery, the second one for restoring blood circulation to his left leg, the doctors announced that it would have to be amputated below the knee. After surgery by Dr. Thomas Hölzenbein, his condition was described as "stable", and it was affirmed that Lanzinger "could have died" without the amputation because the leg was virtually dead below the knee. The treatment of Lanzinger's injury during the first hours has been criticized, and some comments have held that a better attention to the blood circulation in an early time could have saved Lanzinger's leg. The security of the slope in Kvitfjell has also been criticized. The Austrian ski federation has stated that they will continue to support Lanzinger both personally and publicly.

In 2010, the Norwegian patient advocacy found that Lanzinger had not received adequate treatment for his injuries, and was entitled to monetary compensation from Ullevål University Hospital.

== Paralympian ==
Upon leaving hospital after his amputation, Lanzinger initially intended to put an end to his skiing career, and studied marketing. He subsequently resumed training, however, with his coach Manuel Hujara, within the field of disabled sports. He qualified as part of Austria's delegation to the 2014 Winter Paralympics in Sochi, to compete in Alpine skiing (in the standing category). He took two silver medals at the Games in the super-G and the Combined. Lanzinger announced his retirement during the 2015 IPC Alpine Skiing World Championships, where he took silver medals in the downhill and super-G and bronzes in the giant slalom and Super Combined.

== Personal life ==
Lanzinger has been with his wife, Eva, since 1999. They have two children.
