= Markus Salcher =

Austrian para-alpine skier (born 1991)

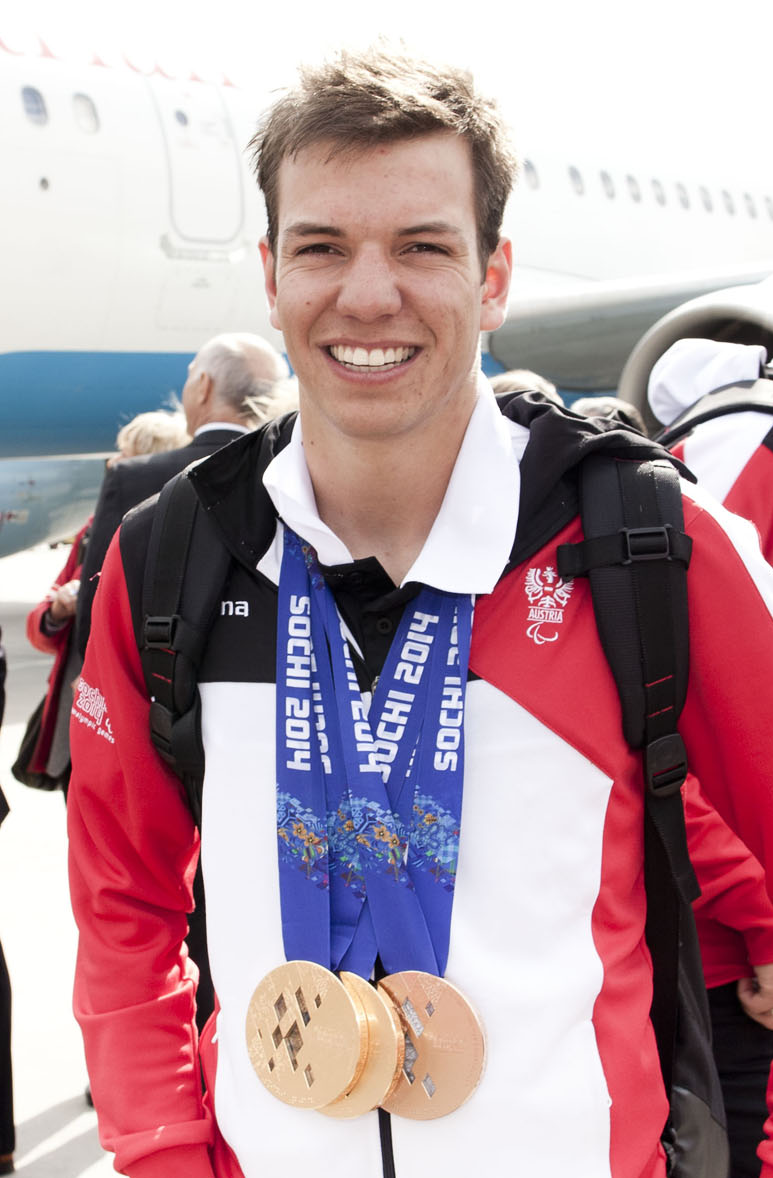
- Salcher with his 2014 Winter Olympic medals

Personal information
- Nationality: Austrian
- Born: 1 June 1991 (age 35) Klagenfurt, Austria
- Height: 180
- Weight: 85 kg (187 lb)

Sport
- Country: Austria
- Sport: Alpine skiing
- Events: Downhill slalom Giant slalom Super combined Super G
Medal record
Men's para alpine skiing
Representing Austria
Paralympic Games
Gold medal – first place	2014 Sochi	Super-G, standing
Gold medal – first place	2014 Sochi	Downhill, standing
Silver medal – second place	2022 Beijing	Super-G, standing
Bronze medal – third place	2014 Sochi	Giant slalom, standing
World Championships
Gold medal – first place	2013 La Molina	Downhill
Gold medal – first place	2017 Tarvisio	Downhill
Gold medal – first place	2017 Tarvisio	Super-G
Gold medal – first place	2021 Lillehammer	Downhill
Gold medal – first place	2021 Lillehammer	Super-G
Gold medal – first place	2023 Lleida	Downhill
Gold medal – first place	2023 Lleida	Super-G
Silver medal – second place	2015 Panorama	Super combined
Silver medal – second place	2015 Panorama	Giant slalom
Silver medal – second place	2019 Sella Nevea	Downhill
Bronze medal – third place	2017 Tarvisio	Super combined
Bronze medal – third place	2019 Sella Nevea	Super-G

Markus Salcher (born 1 June 1991) is an Austrian alpine skier and Paralympic Champion. He competed in the 2014 Winter Paralympics in Sochi, Russia, where he won two gold medals.

He won the silver medal in the men's super-G standing event at the 2022 Winter Paralympics held in Beijing, China.

== Career ==
Due to the sportive background of his family Markus’ first attempts on skis were undertaken early in life. At the age of only three years the first turns on skis were carved into the snow. The local ski club (SV Tröpolach in the Nassfeld skiing area) and his family helped to develop a solid skiing technique as well as a passion for the sport early on. The first racing experiences were gained at the age of five when Markus began to compete in local skiing cups against non-disabled age-peers. Even though these first races were not overly successful, the motivation to pursue a professional career as a skier did not wane. First contacts to the field of professional disabled sports were made during the winter of 2000. Since the 2003 / 2004 winter season Markus has been an active athlete member of various teams of the Austrian Skiing Federation (ÖSV). In addition to Markus’ personal ambition and self-motivation, the Sports-High School (SSLK Klagenfurt) needs to be credited with a big share in the development of the young athlete's personal and athletic skills, from first semi-professional training programs to the acceptance into Austria's National Skiing Team.
