= Aleksandra Frantseva =

Russian Paralympic alpine skier (born 1987)

Aleksandra Vyacheslavovna Frantseva
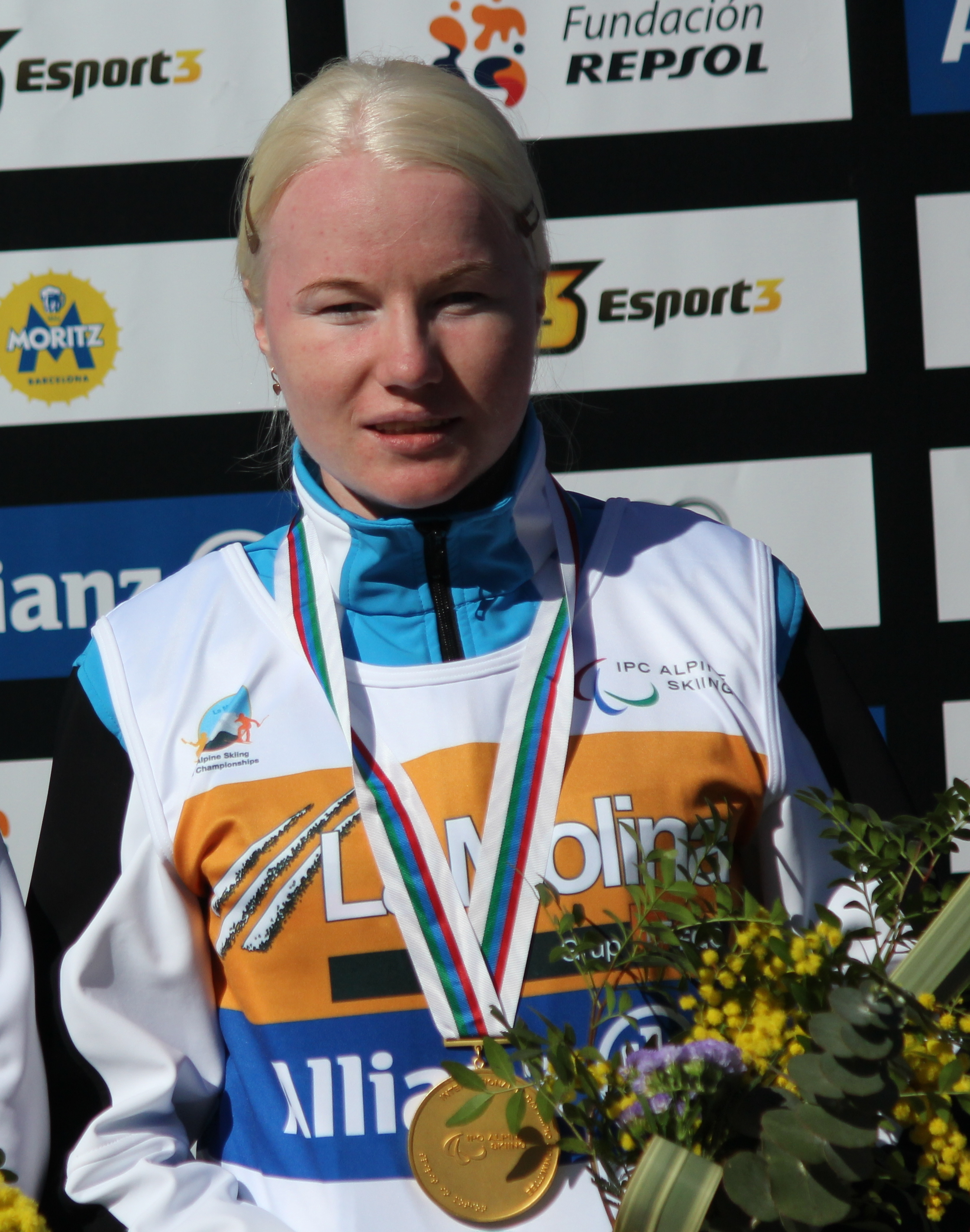
- Aleksandra Frantseva at the 2013 IPC Alpine World Championships

Personal information
- Born: 24 April 1987 (age 39) Kamchatka Krai, Russia

Skiing career
- Sport: Alpine skiing
- Disciplines: Slalom, giant slalom, super-G, downhill

Paralympics
- Medals: 5 (2 gold)

World Championships
- Medals: 15 (5 gold)
Medal record
Women's alpine skiing
Representing Russia
Paralympic Games
Gold medal – first place	2014 Sochi	Slalom
Gold medal – first place	2014 Sochi	Super combined
Silver medal – second place	2014 Sochi	Super-G
Silver medal – second place	2014 Sochi	Giant slalom
Bronze medal – third place	2014 Sochi	Downhill
IPC Alpine Skiing World Championships
Gold medal – first place	2013 La Molina	Super combined
Gold medal – first place	2013 La Molina	Super-G
Gold medal – first place	2015 Panorama	Giant slalom
Silver medal – second place	2013 La Molina	Downhill
Silver medal – second place	2013 La Molina	Slalom
Silver medal – second place	2015 Panorama	Super combined
Bronze medal – third place	2015 Panorama	Downhill
Bronze medal – third place	2015 Panorama	Super-G

Aleksandra Vyachelsavovna Frantseva (Russian: Александра Вячеславовна Францева; born 24 April 1987) is a Russian Paralympic alpine skier who won two gold, two silver and a bronze medals at the 2014 Winter Paralympics in Sochi, Russia. She performed in the events for the athletes with impaired vision where she was assisted by a guide named Pavel Zabotin.

== Personal history ==
Aleksandra Frantseva was born in Kamchatka Krai. On 17 March 2014 she was awarded Russian Order "For Merit to the Fatherland", IV class.

== Career ==
On 18 January 2014 she won 2014 Alpine Skiing World Cup by beating Jade Etherington by one hundredth of a second in Copper Mountain, Colorado.

At the 2014 Paralympics, Frantseva won gold medals in slalom and super combined and also won silver one for super-G defeating Etherington on Friday 14 March. Later on she won a bronze medal for downhill skiing at the same place.
