= Avacha (river) =

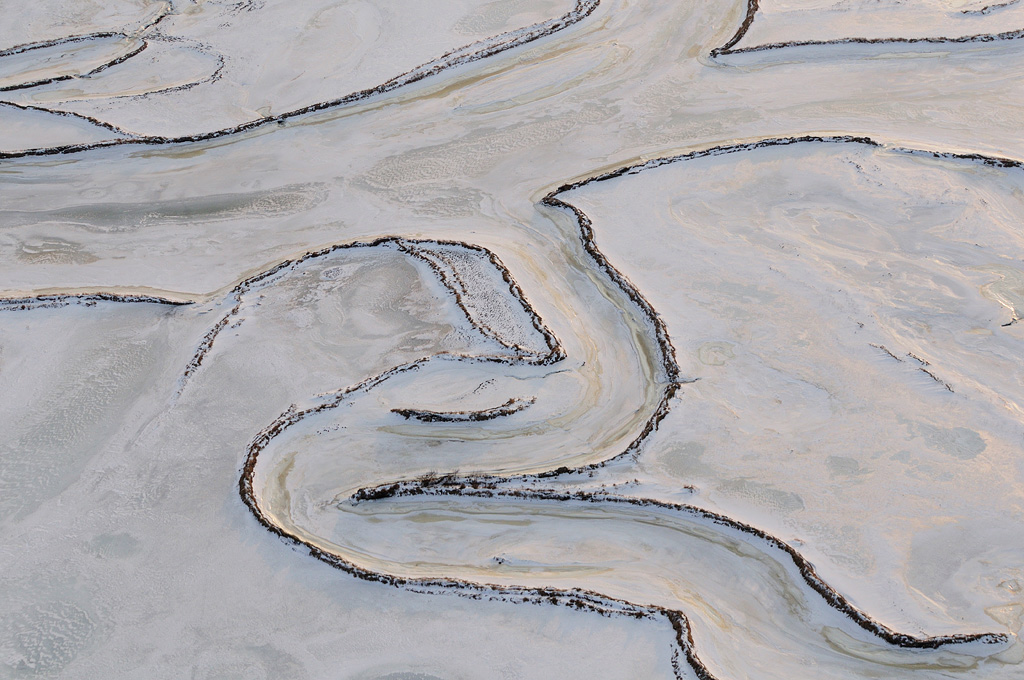

- Location of mouth

Location
- Country: Russia

Physical characteristics
- Mouth: Pacific Ocean
  - location: Avacha Bay
  - coordinates: 53.0285°N 158.5056°E
- Length: 122 km (76 mi)
- Basin size: 5,090 km^{2} (1,970 sq mi)

Avacha (Russian: Ава́ча) is a river in the southern part of the Kamchatka Peninsula, Russia. It flows southeast into Avacha Bay, near Petropavlovsk-Kamchatsky. The river is 122 kilometres (76 mi) long with a watershed of 5,090 square kilometres (1,970 mi^{2}). Nineteenth-century travelers like George Kennan ascended the Avacha as far as possible and then took horses to the upper course of the river Kamchatka to travel further north.

The town of Yelizovo, which houses the Petropavlovsk-Kamchatsky Airport, is on the banks of the Avacha.
