= Avacha Bay =

Bay on the southeastern coast of Kamchatka, Russia

Coordinates: 52°56′N 158°36′E

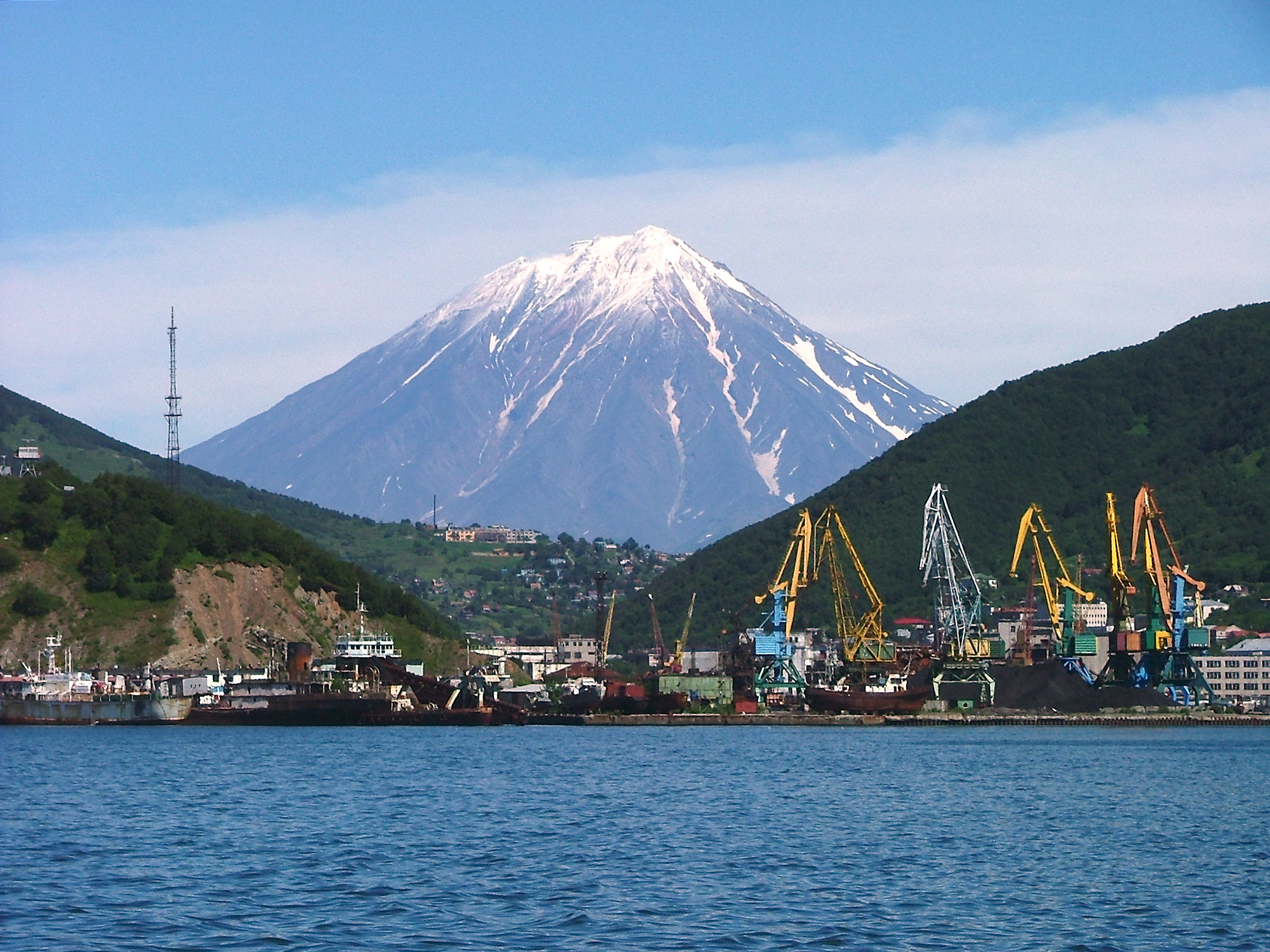
Petropavlovsk and Koryaksky Volcano, as seen from Avacha Bay

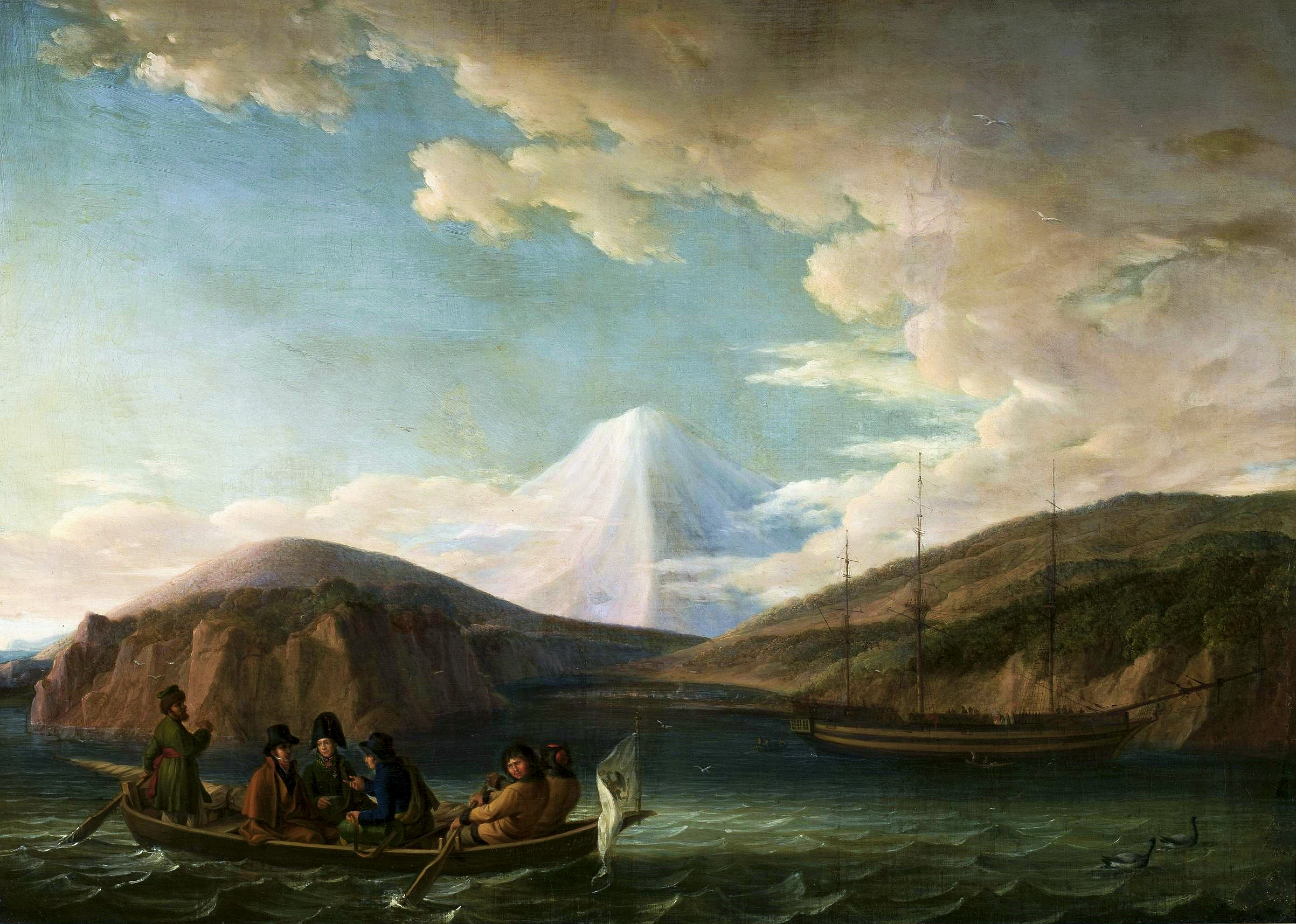
Adam Johann von Krusenstern in Avacha Bay by Friedrich Georg Weitsch, c. 1806, National Museum in Warsaw

Avacha Bay (Russian: Авачинская губа, Авачинская бухта) is a Pacific Ocean bay on the southeastern coast of the Kamchatka Peninsula. It is 24 km (15 mi) long and 3 km (2 mi) wide (at the mouth), with a maximum depth of 26 m (85 ft).

The Avacha River flows into the bay. The port city of Petropavlovsk-Kamchatsky and the closed town of Vilyuchinsk lie on the coast of the bay. It is the main transport gateway to the Kamchatka region. The bay freezes in the winter.

It was first discovered by Vitus Bering in 1729. It was surveyed and mapped by Captain Mikhail Tebenkov of the Imperial Russian Navy in the 1830s.

Avacha Bay was the scene of a massive die-off of benthic marine organisms in September–October 2020.

Situated on the south end of the bay in Vilyuchinsk is Russia's largest submarine base, the Rybachiy Nuclear Submarine Base, established during the Soviet period and still used by the Russian Navy.

== Description ==
The Avacha Bay is an internal part of Avacha Gulf. Its total area is 215 square kilometers, and it is up to 26 meters deep. The main rivers flowing into the bay are the Avacha and Paratunka.

== See also ==
- Tri Brata – "Three brothers", a major landmark in the bay
- Petropavlovsk-Kamchatsky
- Nikolskaya sopka
