= Alpine skiing at the 2002 Winter Paralympics – Women's giant slalom =

Alpine skiing - Women's giant slalom at the VIII Paralympic Winter Games
- Venue: Snowbasin
- Competitors: 48 from 17 nations

Women's giant slalom skiing events at the 2002 Winter Paralympics were contested at Snowbasin.

There were 6 events covering 10 disability classes. Final standings were decided by applying a disability factor to the actual times achieved.

== Visually impaired ==
There was one event under the visually impaired classification.

B2-3

- B2 – visually impaired: up to ca 3-5% functional vision
- B3 – visually impaired: under 10% functional vision

Rank	Name	Country	Class	Real Time	Calc Time	Difference
1st place, gold medalist(s)	Katerina Tepla	Czech Republic	B3	2:34.60	2:20.25	
2nd place, silver medalist(s)	Pascale Casanova	France	B2	2:45.12	2:24.39	+4.14
3rd place, bronze medalist(s)	Sabina Rogie	Czech Republic	B3	2:51.98	2:36.01	+15.76
4	Signe Bergmann	Austria	B2	3:09.09	2:45.35	+25.10
5	Mi Jeong Kim	South Korea	B2	3:09.12	2:45.38	+25.13
6	Klara Bechova	Czech Republic	B3	3:22.74	3:03.92	+43.67
7	Livia Guillardini	Spain	B2	3:49.94	3:21.08	+0.83
-	Carmen Garcia Rigav	Spain	B3	DNF		
-	Gabriele Huemer	Austria	B2	DNF		
-	Katja Koponen	Finland	B3	DNF		

== Sitting ==
There were two events under the sitting classification.

LW10-11

- LW 10 – sitting: paraplegia with no or some upper abdominal function and no functional sitting balance
- LW 11 – sitting: paraplegia with fair functional sitting balance

Rank	Name	Country	Class	Real Time	Calc Time	Difference
1st place, gold medalist(s)	Sarah Will	United States	LW11	2:56.60	2:27.68	
2nd place, silver medalist(s)	Muffy Davis	United States	LW10	3:19.96	2:30.95	+3.27
3rd place, bronze medalist(s)	Lacey Heward	United States	LW11	3:08.73	2:37.82	+10.14
4	Jutta Nebauer	Germany	LW10	3:33.44	2:41.12	+13.44
5	Agata Struzik	Poland	LW11	3:26.76	2:52.90	+25.22
6	Vreni Stoeckli	Switzerland	LW11	3:30.41	2:55.95	+28.27
-	Laurence Broche	France	LW10	DNS		
-	Tatsuko Aoki	Japan	LW10	DNF		

LW12

- LW 12 – sitting: double leg amputation above the knees, or paraplegia with some leg function and good sitting balance

Rank	Name	Country	Class	Real Time	Calc Time	Difference
1st place, gold medalist(s)	Allison Pearl	United States	LW12	2:53.83	2:27.36	
2nd place, silver medalist(s)	Cecilia Paulson	Sweden	LW12	3:04.38	2:36.30	+8.94
3rd place, bronze medalist(s)	Kuniko Obinata	Japan	LW12	3:25.37	2:57.29	+29.93
4	Christiane Singhammer	Germany	LW12	3:27.09	2:58.77	+31.41
-	Stephani Victor	United States	LW12	DNF		
-	Armenuhi Nikoghosyan	Armenia	LW12	DNF		

== Standing ==
There were 3 events under the standing classification.

LW2

- LW2 – standing: single leg amputation above the knee

Rank	Name	Country	Class	Real Time	Calc Time	Difference
1st place, gold medalist(s)	Danja Haslacher	Austria	LW2	2:40.62	2:24.85	
2nd place, silver medalist(s)	Allison Jones	United States	LW2	2:49.15	2:32.55	+7.70
3rd place, bronze medalist(s)	Nicola Lechner	Austria	LW2	2:49.60	2:32.95	+8.10
4	Marie-Chantal Manenc	France	LW2	2:54.29	2:37.19	+12.34
5	Inga Medvedeva	Russia	LW2	2:57.04	2:39.66	+14.81
6	Sandy Dukat	United States	LW2	2:57.91	2:40.45	+15.60
7	Yumi Ito	Japan	LW2	3:15.69	2:56.48	+31.63
8	Katja Saarinen	Finland	LW2	3:17.81	2:58.39	+33.54
9	Armenuhi Valesyan	Armenia	LW2	3:22.15	3:02.30	+37.45
-	Oxana Miryasova	Russia	LW2	DNF		
-	Sarah Billmeier	United States	LW2	DNF		

LW3, 4, 9

- LW3 – standing: double leg amputation below the knee, mild cerebral palsy, or equivalent impairment
- LW4 – standing: single leg amputation below the knee
- LW9 – standing: amputation or equivalent impairment of one arm and one leg

Rank	Name	Country	Class	Real Time	Calc Time	Difference
1st place, gold medalist(s)	Mary Riddell	United States	LW4	2:26.22	2:25.90	
2nd place, silver medalist(s)	Karolina Wisniewska	Canada	LW3	2:40.89	2:29.85	+3.95
3rd place, bronze medalist(s)	Lauren Woolstencroft	Canada	LW3	2:42.33	2:31.03	+5.13
4	Jennifer Kelchner	United States	LW4	2:33.49	2:33.16	+7.26
5	Hannah Pennington	United States	LW3	2:53.00	2:41.13	+15.23
6	Lee Joiner	United States	LW9	3:35.35	2:42.38	+16.48
7	Slava Janasova	Slovakia	LW9	3:07.71	2:44.39	+18.49

LW6/8

- LW6/8 – standing: single arm amputation

Rank	Name	Country	Class	Real Time	Calc Time	Difference
1st place, gold medalist(s)	Rachael Battersby	New Zealand	LW6/8	2:26.53	2:26.53	
2nd place, silver medalist(s)	Csilla Kristof	United States	LW6/8	2:27.13	2:27.13	+0.60
3rd place, bronze medalist(s)	Iveta Chlebakova	Slovakia	LW6/8	2:31.03	2:31.03	+4.50
4	Naomi Sasaki	Japan	LW6/8	2:32.02	2:32.02	+5.49
5	Dagmar Vollmer	Germany	LW6/8	2:33.06	2:33.06	+6.53
-	Sonia Alfredsson	Sweden	LW6/8	DNF		
