= Alpine skiing at the 2002 Winter Paralympics – Women's super-G =

Alpine skiing - Women's super-G at the VIII Paralympic Winter Games
- Venue: Snowbasin
- Competitors: 43 from 17 nations

Women's super-G skiing events at the 2002 Winter Paralympics were contested at Snowbasin.

There were 4 events covering 10 disability classes. Final standings were decided by applying a disability factor to the actual times achieved.

== Visually impaired ==
There was one event under the visually impaired classification.

B2-3

- B2 – visually impaired: up to ca 3-5% functional vision
- B3 – visually impaired: under 10% functional vision

Rank	Name	Country	Class	Real Time	Calc Time	Difference
1st place, gold medalist(s)	Katerina Tepla	Czech Republic	B3	1:23.85	1:15.60	
2nd place, silver medalist(s)	Gabriele Huemer	Austria	B2	1:30.08	1:18.49	+2.89
3rd place, bronze medalist(s)	Pascale Casanova	France	B2	1:32.88	1:20.93	+5.33
4	Mi Jeong Kim	South Korea	B2	1:37.22	1:24.71	+9.11
5	Sabina Rogie	Czech Republic	B3	1:36.39	1:26.91	+11.31
6	Signe Bergmann	Austria	B2	1:43.64	1:30.30	+14.70
7	Klara Bechova	Czech Republic	B3	1:47.39	1:36.83	+21.23
8	Katja Koponen	Finland	B3	1:52.41	1:41.36	+25.76
9	Livia Guillardini	Spain	B2	2:11.12	1:54.25	+38.65
-	Carmen Garcia Rigav	Spain	B3	DNF		

== Sitting ==
There was one event under the sitting classification.

LW10-12

- LW 10 – sitting: paraplegia with no or some upper abdominal function and no functional sitting balance
- LW 11 – sitting: paraplegia with fair functional sitting balance
- LW 12 – sitting: double leg amputation above the knees, or paraplegia with some leg function and good sitting balance

Rank	Name	Country	Class	Real Time	Calc Time	Difference
1st place, gold medalist(s)	Sarah Will	United States	LW11	1:35.83	1:19.43	
2nd place, silver medalist(s)	Muffy Davis	United States	LW10	1:45.05	1:21.97	+2.54
3rd place, bronze medalist(s)	Lacey Heward	United States	LW11	1:39.17	1:22.20	+2.77
4	Cecilia Paulson	Sweden	LW12	1:38.82	1:24.38	+4.95
5	Tatsuko Aoki	Japan	LW10	1:48.87	1:24.95	+5.52
6	Stephani Victor	United States	LW12	1:40.23	1:26.93	+7.50
7	Kuniko Obinata	Japan	LW12	1:41.29	1:27.85	+8.42
8	Vreni Stoeckli	Switzerland	LW11	1:49.45	1:30.72	+11.29
9	Jutta Nebauer	Germany	LW10	1:56.89	1:31.21	+11.78
10	Agata Struzik	Poland	LW11	1:54.53	1:34.93	+15.50
-	Allison Pearl	United States	LW12	DNF		
-	Laurence Broche	France		DNF		

== Standing ==
There were 2 events under the standing classification.

LW2

- LW2 – standing: single leg amputation above the knee

Rank	Name	Country	Class	Real Time	Calc Time	Difference
1st place, gold medalist(s)	Sarah Billmeier	United States	LW2	1:26.81	1:18.43	
2nd place, silver medalist(s)	Allison Jones	United States	LW2	1:31.46	1:22.63	+4.20
3rd place, bronze medalist(s)	Sandy Dukat	United States	LW2	1:33.13	1:24.14	+5.71
4	Nicola Lechner	Austria	LW2	1:33.30	1:24.29	+5.86
5	Oxana Miryasova	Russia	LW2	1:33.33	1:24.32	+5.89
6	Marie-Chantal Manenc	France	LW2	1:35.43	1:26.22	+7.79
7	Yumi Ito	Japan	LW2	1:46.93	1:36.61	+18.18
8	Armenuhi Valesyan	Armenia	LW2	3:21.86	3:02.37	+43.94
-	Danja Haslacher	Austria	LW2	DNF		
-	Katja Saarinen	Finland	LW2	DNF		
-	Inga Medvedeva	Russia	LW2	DNF		

LW3, 4, 6/8, 9

- LW3 – standing: double leg amputation below the knee, mild cerebral palsy, or equivalent impairment
- LW4 – standing: single leg amputation below the knee
- LW6/8 – standing: single arm amputation
- LW9 – standing: amputation or equivalent impairment of one arm and one leg

Rank	Name	Country	Class	Real Time	Calc Time	Difference
1st place, gold medalist(s)	Lauren Woolstencroft	Canada	LW3	1:27.04	1:18.12	
2nd place, silver medalist(s)	Mary Riddell	United States	LW4	1:19.84	1:18.83	+0.71
3rd place, bronze medalist(s)	Karolina Wisniewska	Canada	LW3	1:28.31	1:20.60	+2.48
4	Jennifer Kelchner	United States	LW4	1:22.13	1:21.09	+2.97
5	Dagmar Vollmer	Germany	LW6/8	1:21.44	1:21.44	+3.32
6	Rachael Battersby	New Zealand	LW6/8	1:23.27	1:23.27	+5.15
7	Iveta Chlebakova	Slovakia	LW6/8	1:24.00	1:24.00	+5.88
8	Lee Joiner	United States	LW9	1:48.64	1:26.53	+8.41
9	Hannah Pennington	United States	LW3	1:57.01	1:46.80	+28.68
-	Csilla Kristof	United States	LW6/8	DNF		
