= Alpine skiing at the 2002 Winter Paralympics – Men's giant slalom =

Alpine skiing - Men's giant slalom at the VIII Paralympic Winter Games
- Venue: Snowbasin
- Competitors: 131 from 30 nations

Men's giant slalom events at the 2002 Winter Paralympics were contested at Snowbasin.

There were 9 events covering 12 disability classes. Final standings were decided by applying a disability factor to the actual times achieved.

== Visually impaired ==
There were two events under the visually impaired classification.

B1-2

- B1 – visually impaired: no functional vision
- B2 – visually impaired: up to ca 3-5% functional vision

Rank	Name	Country	Class	Real Time	Calc Time	Difference
1st place, gold medalist(s)	Eric Villalon	Spain	B2	2:34.51	2:12.34	
2nd place, silver medalist(s)	Bart Bunting	Australia	B1	3:53.60	2:14.60	+2.26
3rd place, bronze medalist(s)	Radomir Dudas	Slovakia	B2	2:44.95	2:21.29	+8.95
4	Stefan Kopcik	Slovakia	B2	2:47.23	2:23.24	+10.90
5	Kurt Primus	Austria	B2	2:51.83	2:27.18	+14.84
-	Daniel Esquiva	Spain		DNF		

B3

- B3 – visually impaired: under 10% functional vision

Rank	Name	Country	Class	Real Time	Calc Time	Difference
1st place, gold medalist(s)	Yon Santacana	Spain	B3	2:26.46	2:08.33	
2nd place, silver medalist(s)	Gianmaria Dal Maistro	Italy	B3	2:29.45	2:10.95	+2.62
3rd place, bronze medalist(s)	Andrew Parr	United States	B3	2:30.37	2:11.75	+3.42
4	Norbert Holik	Slovakia	B3	2:32.57	2:13.69	+5.36
5	Chris Williamson	Canada	B3	2:44.26	2:23.92	+15.59
-	Jordi Rozas	Spain	B3	DNF		

== Sitting ==
There were three events under the sitting classification.

LW10

- LW 10 – sitting: paraplegia with no or some upper abdominal function and no functional sitting balance

Rank	Name	Country	Class	Real Time	Calc Time	Difference
1st place, gold medalist(s)	Martin Braxenthaler	Germany	LW10	2:45.21	2:11.38	
2nd place, silver medalist(s)	Ronny Persson	Sweden	LW10	2:49.55	2:14.83	+3.45
3rd place, bronze medalist(s)	Chris Waddell	United States	LW10	2:49.93	2:15.13	+3.75
4	Thomas Bechter	Austria	LW10	2:54.60	2:18.85	+7.47
5	Andreas Kapfinger	Austria	LW10	3:10.84	2:31.76	+20.38
6	Dragan Scepanovic	Finland	LW10	3:15.34	2:35.33	+23.95
7	Stephen Napier	Great Britain	LW10	3:43.04	2:57.37	+45.99
-	Tomas Del Villar	Chile	LW10	DNF		
-	Miguel Llongueras	Andorra	LW10	DNF		
-	Xavier Barios	Andorra	LW10	DNF		
-	Michael Kroener	Germany	LW10	DNF		
-	Ioannis Vlachos	Greece	LW10	DNF		
-	Peter Toneatti	Switzerland	LW10	DNS		
-	Iban Calzada	Spain	LW10	DNF		

LW11

- LW 11 – sitting: paraplegia with fair functional sitting balance

Rank	Name	Country	Class	Real Time	Calc Time	Difference
1st place, gold medalist(s)	Harald Eder	Austria	LW11	2:39.70	2:12.48	
2nd place, silver medalist(s)	Juergen Egle	Austria	LW11	2:40.79	2:13.39	+0.91
3rd place, bronze medalist(s)	Andreas Schiestl	Austria	LW11	2:42.53	2:14.83	+2.35
4	Wendl Eberle	Switzerland	LW11	2:46.80	2:18.38	+5.90
5	Ryuei Shinohe	Japan	LW11	2:50.44	2:21.39	+8.91
6	Raynald Riu	France	LW11	2:50.48	2:21.42	+8.94
7	Masahiro Shitaka	Japan	LW11	2:50.97	2:21.84	+9.36
8	Taiki Morii	Japan	LW11	2:55.64	2:25.71	+13.23
9	Carl Burnett	United States	LW11	3:00.79	2:29.98	+17.50
-	Ireneusz Slabicki	Poland	LW11	DNF		
-	Sandor Navratyil	Hungary	LW11	DNF		
-	Fabrizio Zardini	Italy	LW11	DNF		
-	Nam Je Kim	South Korea	LW11	DNF		

LW12

- LW 12 – sitting: double leg amputation above the knees, or paraplegia with some leg function and good sitting balance

Rank	Name	Country	Class	Real Time	Calc Time	Difference
1st place, gold medalist(s)	Hans Joerg Arnold	Switzerland	LW12	2:49.18	2:20.52	
2nd place, silver medalist(s)	Sang Min Han	South Korea	LW12	2:52.31	2:23.12	+2.60
3rd place, bronze medalist(s)	Scott Patterson	Canada	LW12	2:48.06	2:25.25	+4.73
4	Martin Krivos	Slovakia	LW12	2:48.31	2:25.47	+4.95
5	Reinhold Sampl	Austria	LW12	2:55.36	2:25.65	+5.13
6	Ludwig Wolf	Germany	LW12	2:49.07	2:26.12	+5.60
7	Christopher Devlin-Young	United States	LW12	3:00.55	2:29.96	+9.44
8	Luca Maraffio	Italy	LW12	3:00.64	2:30.04	+9.52
9	Peter Boonaerts	Australia	LW12	3:18.76	2:45.09	+24.57
10	Peter Sutor	Slovakia	LW12	3:18.97	2:45.26	+24.74
11	Knut Andre Nordstoga	Norway	LW12	3:19.17	2:45.43	+24.91
-	Toshihiko Takamura	Japan	LW12	DNF		
-	Daniel Wesley	Canada	LW12	DNF		
-	Antonio Alavedra	Spain	LW12	DNF		
-	Harald Guldahl	Norway	LW12	DNF		
-	Stacy William Kohut	Canada	LW12	DNF		
-	Russell Docker	Great Britain	LW12	DNF		
-	Noriyuki Mori	Japan	LW12	DNF		

== Standing ==
There were 4 events under the standing classification.

LW2

- LW2 – standing: single leg amputation above the knee

Rank	Name	Country	Class	Real Time	Calc Time	Difference
1st place, gold medalist(s)	Michael Milton	Australia	LW2	2:27.59	2:16.12	
2nd place, silver medalist(s)	Jason Lalla	United States	LW2	2:29.68	2:18.05	+1.93
3rd place, bronze medalist(s)	Asle Tangvik	Norway	LW2	2:30.65	2:18.95	+2.83
4	Daniel Kosick	United States	LW2	2:35.54	2:23.46	+7.34
5	Florian Planker	Italy	LW2	2:35.67	2:23.57	+7.45
6	Fritz Berger	Switzerland	LW2	2:35.85	2:23.74	+7.62
7	Simon Raaflaub	Switzerland	LW2	2:38.55	2:26.23	+10.11
8	Michal Nevrkla	Czech Republic	LW2	2:38.78	2:26.44	+10.32
9	Matthias Uhlig	Germany	LW2	2:42.47	2:29.85	+13.73
10	Martijn Wijsman	Netherlands	LW2	2:44.34	2:31.57	+15.45
11	Lukasz Szeliga	Poland	LW2	2:46.13	2:33.22	+17.10
12	Sadegh Kalhor	Iran	LW2	2:46.66	2:33.71	+17.59
13	Kjeld Punt	Netherlands	LW2	2:47.67	2:34.64	+18.52
14	Patricio Morande	Chile	LW2	3:03.05	2:48.83	+32.71
15	Garush Danielyan	Armenia	LW2	3:11.85	2:56.95	+40.83
-	David Warner	South Africa	LW2	DNF		
-	Monte Meier	United States	LW2	DNF		
-	Christian Lanthaler	Italy	LW2	DNF		
-	Mikhail Zhitlovskiy	Russia	LW2	DNF		
-	Stasik Nazaryan	Armenia	LW2	DNF		
-	Hayk Abgaryan	Armenia	LW2	DNF		
-	Hwan Kyung Lee	South Korea	LW2	DNF		
-	Gordon Michael Tuck	Canada	LW2	DSQ		
-	Daniil Anokhin	Russia	LW2	DSQ		
-	Tetsuya Tanaka	Japan	LW2	DNF		
-	Michael Hipp	Germany	LW2	DNF		
-	Markku Mikkonen	Finland	LW2	DNF		
-	Cameron Rahles-Rahbula	Australia	LW2	DNF		

LW3, 5/7, 9

- LW3 – standing: double leg amputation below the knee, mild cerebral palsy, or equivalent impairment
- LW5/7 – standing: double arm amputation
- LW9 – standing: amputation or equivalent impairment of one arm and one leg

Rank	Name	Country	Class	Real Time	Calc Time	Difference
1st place, gold medalist(s)	Gerd Schoenfelder	Germany	LW9	2:15.96	2:13.44	
2nd place, silver medalist(s)	Romain Riboud	France	LW5/7	2:29.56	2:17.56	+4.12
3rd place, bronze medalist(s)	Arno Hirschbuehl	Austria	LW5/7	2:35.51	2:23.04	+9.60
4	Jacob Rife	United States	LW5/7	2:40.71	2:29.68	+16.24
5	Walter Kaelin	Switzerland	LW3	3:09.64	2:30.43	+16.99
6	Mark Drinnan	Australia	LW5/7	2:43.18	2:31.98	+18.54
7	Jozef Mistina	Slovakia	LW5/7	2:47.54	2:36.04	+22.60
-	Alexei Moshkine	Russia	LW3	DNS		
-	Mher Avanesyan	Armenia	LW9	DNF		
-	Young Jin Jeon	South Korea	LW9	DNF		
-	George Sansonetis	United States	LW5/7	DSQ		
-	Hongbin Kim	South Korea	LW9	DNF		

LW4

- LW4 – standing: single leg amputation below the knee

Rank	Name	Country	Class	Real Time	Calc Time	Difference
1st place, gold medalist(s)	Steven Bayley	New Zealand	LW4	2:15.10	2:14.11	
2nd place, silver medalist(s)	Hans Burn	Switzerland	LW4	2:17.21	2:16.20	+2.09
3rd place, bronze medalist(s)	Robert Meusburger	Austria	LW4	2:18.88	2:17.86	+3.75
4	Clay Fox	United States	LW4	2:19.36	2:18.33	+4.22
5	Michael Bruegger	Switzerland	LW4	2:20.58	2:19.55	+5.44
6	James Lagerstrom	United States	LW4	2:20.68	2:19.65	+5.54
7	Hubert Mandl	Austria	LW4	2:23.55	2:22.49	+8.38
8	Naoya Maruyama	Japan	LW4	2:24.70	2:23.64	+9.53
-	Igor Kostenko	Russia	LW4	DNF		
-	Alexandre Pirogov	Russia	LW4	DNF		
-	Scott Adams	Australia	LW4	DNF		
-	Zadro Tomislav	Croatia	LW4	DNF		
-	Mark Ludbrook	Canada	LW4	DNF		
-	Josef Schoesswendter	Austria	LW4	DNF		
-	Cedric Amafroi-Broisat	France	LW4	DNF		

LW6/8

- LW6/8 – standing: single arm amputation

Rank	Name	Country	Class	Real Time	Calc Time	Difference
1st place, gold medalist(s)	Rolf Heinzmann	Switzerland	LW6/8	2:14.42	2:14.42	
2nd place, silver medalist(s)	Lionel Brun	France	LW6/8	2:16.35	2:16.35	+1.93
3rd place, bronze medalist(s)	Frank Pfortmueller	Germany	LW6/8	2:18.51	2:18.51	+4.09
4	Wolfgang Moosbrugger	Austria	LW6/8	2:19.00	2:19.00	+4.58
5	Walter Lackner	Austria	LW6/8	2:19.37	2:19.37	+4.95
6	Markus Pfefferle	Germany	LW6/8	2:20.13	2:20.13	+5.71
7	Stanislav Loska	Czech Republic	LW6/8	2:20.21	2:20.21	+5.79
8	Walter Kaelin	Switzerland	LW6/8	2:22.45	2:22.45	+8.03
9	Shinji Inoue	Japan	LW6/8	2:23.00	2:23.00	+8.58
10	Lei Wang	China	LW6/8	2:29.53	2:29.53	+15.11
11	Piotr Marek	Poland	LW6/8	2:30.30	2:30.30	+15.88
-	Reed Robinson	United States	LW6/8	DNF		
-	Ian Balfour	Canada	LW6/8	DNF		
-	Tomasz Gajos	Poland	LW6/8	DNF		
-	Adam Fromma	United States	LW6/8	DNF		
-	Paolo Rabogliatti	Italy	LW6/8	DSQ		
-	Tomasz Juszczak	Poland	LW6/8	DNF		
-	Yasunori Todoroki	Japan	LW6/8	DNF		
-	Martin Cupka	Slovakia	LW6/8	DNF		
