= Alpine skiing at the 2002 Winter Paralympics – Men's super-G =

Alpine skiing - Men's super-G at the VIII Paralympic Winter Games
- Venue: Snowbasin
- Competitors: 123 from 22 nations

Men's super-G events at the 2002 Winter Paralympics were contested at Snowbasin.

There were 8 events covering 12 disability classes. Final standings were decided by applying a disability factor to the actual times achieved.

== Visually impaired ==
There was one event under the visually impaired classification.

B1-3

- B1 – visually impaired: no functional vision
- B2 – visually impaired: up to ca 3-5% functional vision
- B3 – visually impaired: under 10% functional vision

Rank	Name	Country	Class	Real Time	Calc Time	Difference
1st place, gold medalist(s)	Bart Bunting	Australia	B1	2:00.92	1:09.54	
2nd place, silver medalist(s)	Eric Villalon	Spain	B2	1:22.02	1:10.04	+0.50
3rd place, bronze medalist(s)	Yon Santacana	Spain	B3	1:20.21	1:11.22	+1.68
4	Gianmaria Dal Maistro	Italy	B3	1:20.68	1:11.64	+2.10
5	Chris Williamson	Canada	B3	1:22.20	1:12.99	+3.45
6	Kurt Primus	Austria	B2	1:31.95	1:18.51	+8.97
7	Jordi Rozas	Spain	B3	1:29.20	1:19.21	+9.67
-	Josef Erlacher	Italy	B3	DNS		
-	Norbert Holik	Slovakia	B3	DNS		
-	Radomir Dudas	Slovakia	B2	DNS		
-	Stefan Kopcik	Slovakia	B2	DNS		
-	Andrew Parr	United States	B3	DNF		

== Sitting ==
There were three events under the sitting classification.

LW10

- LW 10 – sitting: paraplegia with no or some upper abdominal function and no functional sitting balance

Rank	Name	Country	Class	Real Time	Calc Time	Difference
1st place, gold medalist(s)	Martin Braxenthaler	Germany	LW10	1:27.63	1:10.09	
2nd place, silver medalist(s)	Ronny Persson	Sweden	LW10	1:35.51	1:16.40	+6.31
3rd place, bronze medalist(s)	Michael Kroener	Germany	LW10	1:35.93	1:16.73	+6.64
4	Thomas Bechter	Austria	LW10	1:36.70	1:17.35	+7.26
5	Andreas Kapfinger	Austria	LW10	1:40.43	1:20.33	+10.24
6	Stephen Napier	Great Britain	LW10	1:54.33	1:31.45	+21.36
-	Chris Waddell	United States	LW10	DNF		
-	Peter Toneatti	Switzerland	LW10	DNF		
-	Iban Calzada	Spain	LW10	DNF		
-	Nick Catanzarite	United States	LW10	DNF		

LW11

- LW 11 – sitting: paraplegia with fair functional sitting balance

Rank	Name	Country	Class	Real Time	Calc Time	Difference
1st place, gold medalist(s)	Fabrizio Zardini	Italy	LW11	1:29.08	1:13.76	
2nd place, silver medalist(s)	Andreas Schiestl	Austria	LW11	1:30.04	1:14.56	+0.80
3rd place, bronze medalist(s)	Denis Barbet	France	LW11	1:30.75	1:15.14	+1.38
4	Juergen Egle	Austria	LW11	1:31.97	1:16.15	+2.39
5	Ryuei Shinohe	Japan	LW11	1:33.40	1:17.34	+3.58
6	Joe Tompkins	United States	LW11	1:36.37	1:19.80	+6.04
7	Raynald Riu	France	LW11	1:37.69	1:20.89	+7.13
8	Masahiro Shitaka	Japan	LW11	1:38.03	1:21.17	+7.41
9	Nam Je Kim	South Korea	LW11	1:39.00	1:21.98	+8.22
10	Ken Lacome	United States	LW11	1:40.08	1:22.87	+9.11
11	Carl Burnett	United States	LW11	1:43.53	1:25.73	+11.97
12	Ireneusz Slabicki	Poland	LW11	2:12.58	1:49.78	+36.02
-	Wendl Eberle	Switzerland	LW11			
-	Harald Eder	Austria	LW11			

LW12

- LW 12 – sitting: double leg amputation above the knees, or paraplegia with some leg function and good sitting balance

Rank	Name	Country	Class	Real Time	Calc Time	Difference
1st place, gold medalist(s)	Christopher Devlin-Young	United States	LW12	1:24.98	1:11.29	
2nd place, silver medalist(s)	Daniel Wesley	Canada	LW12	1:24.37	1:12.49	+1.20
3rd place, bronze medalist(s)	Ludwig Wolf	Germany	LW12	1:25.58	1:13.52	+2.23
4	Stacy William Kohut	Canada	LW12	1:28.49	1:14.24	+2.95
5	Scott Patterson	Canada	LW12	1:28.65	1:16.16	+4.87
6	Hans Joerg Arnold	Switzerland	LW12	1:31.18	1:16.50	+5.21
7	Sang Min Han	South Korea	LW12	1:34.58	1:19.35	+8.06
8	Luca Maraffio	Italy	LW12	1:36.14	1:20.66	+9.37
9	Reinhold Sampl	Austria	LW12	1:36.42	1:20.89	+9.60
10	Peter Sutor	Slovakia	LW12	1:49.37	1:31.76	+20.47
11	Martin Krivos	Slovakia	LW12	1:50.58	1:35.00	+23.71
12	Daniel Metivier	United States	LW12	2:24.88	2:01.55	+50.26
-	Russell Docker	Great Britain	LW12	DNF		
-	Toshihiko Takamura	Japan	LW12	DNF		
-	Knut Andre Nordstoga	Norway	LW12	DNF		
-	Harald Guldahl	Norway	LW12	DNF		
-	Noriyuki Mori	Japan	LW12	DNF		
-	Kevin Bramble	United States	LW12	DNF		
-	Thomas Mayer	Germany	LW12	DNS		
-	Jean Yves Le Meur	France	LW12	DNS		
-	Peter Boonaerts	Australia	LW12	DNF		

== Standing ==
There were 4 events under the standing classification.

LW2

- LW2 – standing: single leg amputation above the knee

Rank	Name	Country	Class	Real Time	Calc Time	Difference
1st place, gold medalist(s)	Michael Milton	Australia	LW2	1:19.67	1:13.40	
2nd place, silver medalist(s)	Christian Lanthaler	Italy	LW2	1:22.77	1:16.26	+2.86
3rd place, bronze medalist(s)	Florian Planker	Italy	LW2	1:23.18	1:16.63	+3.23
4	Michael Hipp	Germany	LW2	1:23.79	1:17.20	+3.80
5	Asle Tangvik	Norway	LW2	1:24.01	1:17.40	+4.00
6	Gordon Michael Tuck	Canada	LW2	1:25.46	1:18.73	+5.33
7	Fritz Berger	Switzerland	LW2	1:25.70	1:18.96	+5.56
8	Monte Meier	United States	LW2	1:26.14	1:19.36	+5.96
9	Daniel Kosick	United States	LW2	1:26.90	1:20.06	+6.66
10	Michal Nevrkla	Czech Republic	LW2	1:27.99	1:21.07	+7.67
11	Simon Raaflaub	Switzerland	LW2	1:28.34	1:21.39	+7.99
12	David Warner	South Africa	LW2	1:30.28	1:23.17	+9.77
13	Kjeld Punt	Netherlands	LW2	1:31.05	1:23.88	+10.48
14	Lukasz Szeliga	Poland	LW2	1:32.63	1:25.34	+11.94
15	Jason Lalla	United States	LW2	1:33.09	1:25.76	+12.36
16	Sadegh Kalhor	Iran	LW2	1:34.35	1:26.92	+13.52
17	Martijn Wijsman	Netherlands	LW2	1:38.19	1:30.46	+17.06
18	Garush Danielyan	Armenia	LW2	1:43.13	1:35.01	+21.61
-	Stasik Nazaryan	Armenia	LW2	DNF		
-	Cameron Rahles-Rahbula	Australia	LW2	DNF		
-	Tetsuya Tanaka	Japan	LW2	DNF		
-	Matthias Uhlig	Germany	LW2	DNF		
-	Hayk Abgaryan	Armenia	LW2	DNF		

LW3, 5/7, 9

- LW3 – standing: double leg amputation below the knee, mild cerebral palsy, or equivalent impairment
- LW5/7 – standing: double arm amputation
- LW9 – standing: amputation or equivalent impairment of one arm and one leg

Rank	Name	Country	Class	Real Time	Calc Time	Difference
1st place, gold medalist(s)	Gerd Schoenfelder	Germany	LW5/7	1:16.36	1:15.44	
2nd place, silver medalist(s)	Romain Riboud	France	LW5/7	1:24.64	1:17.29	+1.85
3rd place, bronze medalist(s)	Arno Hirschbuehl	Austria	LW5/7	1:26.15	1:18.66	+3.22
4	Jacob Rife	United States	LW5/7	1:26.39	1:18.85	+3.41
5	George Sansonetis	United States	LW5/7	1:31.39	1:23.45	+8.01
6	Mark Drinnan	Australia	LW5/7	1:32.81	1:24.71	+9.27
7	Jozef Mistina	Slovakia	LW5/7	1:33.04	1:24.92	+9.48
8	Young Jin Jeon	South Korea	LW9	1:30.16	1:29.07	+13.63
9	Hongbin Kim	South Korea	LW9	1:30.61	1:29.52	+14.08
-	Alexei Moshkine	Russia	LW5/7	DNF		
-	Mher Avanesyan	Armenia	LW9	DNF		
-	Walter Kaelin	Switzerland	LW3	DNF		

LW4

- LW4 – standing: single leg amputation below the knee

Rank	Name	Country	Class	Real Time	Calc Time	Difference
1st place, gold medalist(s)	Hubert Mandl	Austria	LW4	1:15.35	1:14.32	
2nd place, silver medalist(s)	Josef Schoesswendter	Austria	LW4	1:16.12	1:15.08	+0.76
3rd place, bronze medalist(s)	Steven Bayley	New Zealand	LW4	1:16.23	1:15.19	+0.87
4	Hans Burn	Switzerland	LW4	1:16.49	1:15.44	+1.12
5	Clay Fox	United States	LW4	1:17.48	1:16.42	+2.10
6	Michael Bruegger	Switzerland	LW4	1:18.76	1:17.68	+3.36
7	Cedric Amafroi-Broisat	France	LW4	1:18.97	1:17.89	+3.57
8	Robert Meusburger	Austria	LW4	1:19.60	1:18.51	+4.19
9	Mark Ludbrook	Canada	LW4	1:21.07	1:19.96	+5.64
-	Igor Kostenko	Russia	LW4	DNS		
-	Naoya Maruyama	Japan	LW4	DNF		
-	Scott Adams	Australia	LW4	DNF		
-	James Lagerstrom	United States	LW4	DNF		

LW6/8

- LW6/8 – standing: single arm amputation

Rank	Name	Country	Class	Real Time	Calc Time	Difference
1st place, gold medalist(s)	Rolf Heinzmann	Switzerland	LW6/8	1:16.17	1:16.17	
2nd place, silver medalist(s)	Lionel Brun	France	LW6/8	1:16.19	1:16.19	+0.02
3rd place, bronze medalist(s)	Wolfgang Moosbrugger	Austria	LW6/8	1:16.55	1:16.55	+0.38
4	Stanislav Loska	Czech Republic	LW6/8	1:16.93	1:16.93	+0.76
5	Frank Pfortmueller	Germany	LW6/8	1:17.23	1:17.23	+1.06
6	Adam Fromma	United States	LW6/8	1:18.36	1:18.36	+2.19
7	Markus Pfefferle	Germany	LW6/8	1:18.44	1:18.44	+2.27
8	Shinji Inoue	Japan	LW6/8	1:18.83	1:18.83	+2.66
9	Paolo Rabogliatti	Italy	LW6/8	1:20.55	1:20.55	+4.38
10	Reed Robinson	United States	LW6/8	1:20.56	1:20.56	+4.39
11	Walter Kaelin	Switzerland	LW6/8	1:20.84	1:20.84	+4.67
12	Piotr Marek	Poland	LW6/8	1:24.81	1:24.81	+8.64
13	Yasunori Todoroki	Japan	LW6/8	1:25.83	1:25.83	+9.66
14	Tomasz Gajos	Poland	LW6/8	1:27.04	1:27.04	+10.87
15	Tomasz Juszczak	Poland	LW6/8	1:28.15	1:28.15	+11.98
-	Ian Balfour	Canada	LW6/8	DNS		
-	Walter Lackner	Austria	LW6/8	DNF		
-	Martin Cupka	Slovakia	LW6/8	DNF		
