= Alpine skiing at the 2002 Winter Paralympics – Women's downhill =

Alpine skiing - Women's downhill at the VIII Paralympic Winter Games
- Venue: Snowbasin
- Competitors: 27 from 15 nations

Women's downhill skiing events at the 2002 Winter Paralympics were contested at Snowbasin.

There were 4 events covering 10 disability classes. Final standings were decided by applying a disability factor to the actual times achieved.

== Visually impaired ==
There was one event under the visually impaired classification.

B2-3

- B2 – visually impaired: up to ca 3-5% functional vision
- B3 – visually impaired: under 10% functional vision

Rank	Name	Country	Class	Real Time	Calc Time	Difference
1st place, gold medalist(s)	Pascale Casanova	France	B2	1:39.37	1:25.80	
2nd place, silver medalist(s)	Katerina Tepla	Czech Republic	B3	1:35.98	1:26.73	+0.93
3rd place, bronze medalist(s)	Gabriele Huemer	Austria	B2	1:47.50	1:32.82	+7.02
4	Mi Jeong Kim	South Korea	B2	1:51.17	1:35.99	+10.19
5	Carmen Garcia Rigav	Spain	B3	1:54.33	1:43.31	+17.51
6	Signe Bergmann	Austria	B2	2:01.73	1:45.11	+19.31
7	Katja Koponen	Finland	B3	2:06.45	1:54.26	+28.46
8	Klara Bechova	Czech Republic	B3	2:07.13	1:54.87	+29.07

== Sitting ==
There was one event under the sitting classification.

LW10-12

- LW 10 – sitting: paraplegia with no or some upper abdominal function and no functional sitting balance
- LW 11 – sitting: paraplegia with fair functional sitting balance
- LW 12 – sitting: double leg amputation above the knees, or paraplegia with some leg function and good sitting balance

Rank	Name	Country	Class	Real Time	Calc Time	Difference
1st place, gold medalist(s)	Sarah Will	United States	LW11	1:45.89	1:25.96	
2nd place, silver medalist(s)	Muffy Davis	United States	LW10	1:50.50	1:27.65	+1.69
3rd place, bronze medalist(s)	Stephani Victor	United States	LW12	1:48.43	1:32.34	+6.38
4	Cecilia Paulson	Sweden	LW12	1:52.92	1:33.15	+7.19
5	Lacey Heward	United States	LW11	1:59.64	1:37.12	+11.16
-	Laurence Broche	France		DNS		
-	Kuniko Obinata	Japan	LW12	DNF		
-	Tatsuko Aoki	Japan	LW10	DNF		

== Standing ==
There were 2 events under the standing classification.

LW2

- LW2 – standing: single leg amputation above the knee

Rank	Name	Country	Class	Real Time	Calc Time	Difference
1st place, gold medalist(s)	Danja Haslacher	Austria	LW2	1:35.25	1:26.75	
2nd place, silver medalist(s)	Sarah Billmeier	United States	LW2	1:37.17	1:28.50	+1.75
3rd place, bronze medalist(s)	Inga Medvedeva	Russia	LW2	1:39.73	1:30.83	+4.08
4	Nicola Lechner	Austria	LW2	1:41.12	1:32.10	+5.35
5	Allison Jones	United States	LW2	1:41.75	1:32.67	+5.92
6	Sandy Dukat	United States	LW2	1:44.92	1:35.56	+8.81
7	Marie-Chantal Manenc	France	LW2	1:44.93	1:35.57	+8.82
8	Oxana Miryasova	Russia	LW2	1:45.54	1:36.12	+9.37
9	Yumi Ito	Japan	LW2	1:54.49	1:44.27	+17.52
10	Katja Saarinen	Finland	LW2	1:55.05	1:44.78	+18.03
-	Armenuhi Valesyan	Armenia	LW2	DSQ		

LW3, 4, 6/8, 9

- LW3 – standing: double leg amputation below the knee, mild cerebral palsy, or equivalent impairment
- LW4 – standing: single leg amputation below the knee
- LW6/8 – standing: single arm amputation
- LW9 – standing: amputation or equivalent impairment of one arm and one leg

Rank	Name	Country	Class	Real Time	Calc Time	Difference
1st place, gold medalist(s)	Rachael Battersby	New Zealand	LW6/8	1:30.63	1:30.63	
2nd place, silver medalist(s)	Csilla Kristof	United States	LW6/8	1:31.41	1:31.41	+0.78
3rd place, bronze medalist(s)	Karolina Wisniewska	Canada	LW3	1:38.25	1:32.19	+1.56
4	Mary Riddell	United States	LW4	1:32.82	1:32.35	+1.72
5	Jennifer Kelchner	United States	LW4	1:33.42	1:32.95	+2.32
6	Dagmar Vollmer	Germany	LW6/8	1:33.79	1:33.79	+3.16
7	Iveta Chlebakova	Slovakia	LW6/8	1:36.09	1:36.09	+5.46
-	Lauren Woolstencroft	Canada	LW3	DNF		
