= Alpine skiing at the 2002 Winter Paralympics – Men's downhill =

Alpine skiing - Men's downhill at the VIII Paralympic Winter Games
- Venue: Snowbasin
- Competitors: 107 from 21 nations

Men's downhill skiing events at the 2002 Winter Paralympics were contested at Snowbasin.

There were 8 events covering 12 disability classes. Final standings were decided by applying a disability factor to the actual times achieved.

== Visually impaired ==
There was one event under the visually impaired classification.

B1-3

- B1 – visually impaired: no functional vision
- B2 – visually impaired: up to ca 3-5% functional vision
- B3 – visually impaired: under 10% functional vision

Rank	Name	Country	Class	Real Time	Calc Time	Difference
1st place, gold medalist(s)	Bart Bunting	Australia	B1	2:23.03	1:19.92	
2nd place, silver medalist(s)	Eric Villalon	Spain	B3	1:34.43	1:20.64	+0.72
3rd place, bronze medalist(s)	Yon Santacana	Spain	B2	1:30.79	1:21.57	+1.65
4	Andrew Parr	United States	B2	1:31.70	1:22.39	+2.47
5	Radomir Dudas	Slovakia	B2	1:38.12	1:23.79	+3.87
6	Gianmaria Dal Maistro	Italy	B3	1:33.51	1:24.01	+4.09
7	Stefan Kopcik	Slovakia	B2	1:43.30	1:28.22	+8.30
8	Josef Erlacher	Italy	B3	1:38.36	1:28.37	+8.45
9	Kurt Primus	Austria	B2	1:43.72	1:28.58	+8.66
10	Jordi Rozas	Spain	B3	1:40.16	1:29.99	+10.07

== Sitting ==
There were three events under the sitting classification.

LW10

- LW 10 – sitting: paraplegia with no or some upper abdominal function and no functional sitting balance

Rank	Name	Country	Class	Real Time	Calc Time	Difference
1st place, gold medalist(s)	Martin Braxenthaler	Germany	LW10	1:41.14	1:22.20	
2nd place, silver medalist(s)	Chris Waddell	United States	LW10	1:41.50	1:22.49	+0.29
3rd place, bronze medalist(s)	Ronny Persson	Sweden	LW10	1:42.14	1:23.01	+0.81
4	Michael Kroener	Germany	LW10	1:31.70	1:24.75	+2.55
5	Nick Catanzarite	United States	LW10	1:38.12	1:28.60	+6.40
6	Iban Calzada	Spain	LW10	1:56.12	1:34.37	+12.17
7	Stephen Napier	Great Britain	LW10	2:13.93	1:48.85	+26.65
8	Thomas Bechter	Austria	LW10	DNF		
8	Peter Toneatti	Switzerland	LW10	DNF		

LW11

- LW 11 – sitting: paraplegia with fair functional sitting balance

Rank	Name	Country	Class	Real Time	Calc Time	Difference
1st place, gold medalist(s)	Harald Eder	Austria	LW11	1:38.05	1:21.04	
2nd place, silver medalist(s)	Andreas Schiestl	Austria	LW11	1:39.25	1:22.03	+0.99
3rd place, bronze medalist(s)	Fabrizio Zardini	Italy	LW11	1:40.43	1:23.01	+1.97
4	Denis Barbet	France	LW11	1:40.77	1:23.29	+2.25
5	Robert Froehle	Austria	LW11	1:42.81	1:24.98	+3.94
6	Joe Tompkins	United States	LW11	1:44.15	1:26.08	+5.04
7	Raynald Riu	France	LW11	1:45.04	1:26.82	+5.78
8	Ryuei Shinohe	Japan	LW11	1:48.19	1:29.42	+8.38
9	Nam Je Kim	South Korea	LW11	1:48.39	1:29.59	+8.55

LW12

- LW 12 – sitting: double leg amputation above the knees, or paraplegia with some leg function and good sitting balance

Rank	Name	Country	Class	Real Time	Calc Time	Difference
1st place, gold medalist(s)	Kevin Bramble	United States	LW12	1:37.80	1:22.05	
2nd place, silver medalist(s)	Christopher Devlin-Young	United States	LW12	1:38.00	1:22.22	+0.17
3rd place, bronze medalist(s)	Daniel Wesley	Canada	LW12	1:38.00	1:23.20	+1.15
4	Reinhold Sampl	Austria	LW12	1:39.32	1:23.33	+1.28
5	Stacy William Kohut	Canada	LW12	1:39.73	1:23.67	+1.62
6	Hans Joerg Arnold	Switzerland	LW12	1:40.76	1:24.53	+2.48
7	Ludwig Wolf	Germany	LW12	1:39.69	1:24.63	+2.58
8	Harald Guldahl	Norway	LW12	1:41.17	1:24.88	+2.83
9	Daniel Metivier	United States	LW12	1:41.51	1:25.16	+3.11
10	Toshihiko Takamura	Japan	LW12	1:44.15	1:27.38	+5.33
11	Luca Maraffio	Italy	LW12	1:45.09	1:28.17	+6.12
12	Sang Min Han	South Korea	LW12	1:47.33	1:30.05	+8.00
13	Knut Andre Nordstoga	Norway	LW12	1:52.40	1:34.30	+12.25
14	Peter Boonaerts	Australia	LW12	1:54.52	1:36.08	+14.03
15	Scott Patterson	Canada	LW12	2:01.32	1:42.99	+20.94
16	Peter Sutor	Slovakia	LW12	2:22.96	1:59.94	+37.89
-	Jean Yves Le Meur	France	LW12	DNF		
-	Thomas Mayer	Germany	LW12	DNF		
-	Noriyuki Mori	Japan	LW12	DNF		
-	Russell Docker	Great Britain	LW12	DNF		
-	Martin Krivos	Slovakia	LW12	DNF		

== Standing ==
There were 4 events under the standing classification.

LW2

- LW2 – standing: single leg amputation above the knee

Rank	Name	Country	Class	Real Time	Calc Time	Difference
1st place, gold medalist(s)	Michael Milton	Australia	LW2	1:28.37	1:23.64	
2nd place, silver medalist(s)	Christian Lanthaler	Italy	LW2	1:30.46	1:25.62	+1.98
3rd place, bronze medalist(s)	Jason Lalla	United States	LW2	1:30.74	1:25.88	+2.24
4	Greg Mannino	United States	LW2	1:30.79	1:25.93	+2.29
5	Monte Meier	United States	LW2	1:32.01	1:27.09	+3.45
6	Michael Hipp	Germany	LW2	1:32.98	1:28.00	+4.36
7	Florian Planker	Italy	LW2	1:33.08	1:28.10	+4.46
8	Fritz Berger	Switzerland	LW2	1:33.69	1:28.68	+5.04
9	Cameron Rahles-Rahbula	Australia	LW2	1:33.80	1:28.78	+5.14
10	Gordon Michael Tuck	Canada	LW2	1:35.70	1:30.58	+6.94
11	Asle Tangvik	Norway	LW2	1:35.85	1:30.72	+7.08
12	Kjeld Punt	Netherlands	LW2	1:36.68	1:31.51	+7.87
13	Matthias Uhlig	Germany	LW2	1:37.01	1:31.82	+8.18
14	Martijn Wijsman	Netherlands	LW2	1:37.23	1:32.03	+8.39
15	David Warner	South Africa	LW2	1:37.52	1:32.30	+8.66
16	Michal Nevrkla	Czech Republic	LW2	1:37.55	1:32.33	+8.69
17	Tetsuya Tanaka	Japan	LW2	1:37.86	1:32.62	+8.98
18	Garush Danielyan	Armenia	LW2	1:46.41	1:40.72	+17.08
19	Hayk Abgaryan	Armenia	LW2	1:48.73	1:42.91	+19.27
20	Simon Raaflaub	Switzerland	LW2	1:50.05	1:44.16	+20.52
-	Stasik Nazaryan	Armenia	LW2	DSQ		

LW3, 5/7, 9

- LW3 – standing: double leg amputation below the knee, mild cerebral palsy, or equivalent impairment
- LW5/7 – standing: double arm amputation
- LW9 – standing: amputation or equivalent impairment of one arm and one leg

Rank	Name	Country	Class	Real Time	Calc Time	Difference
1st place, gold medalist(s)	Gerd Schoenfelder	Germany	LW9	1:25.19	1:23.76	
2nd place, silver medalist(s)	Arno Hirschbuehl	Austria	LW5/7	1:33.55	1:27.71	+3.95
3rd place, bronze medalist(s)	Jacob Rife	United States	LW5/7	1:33.86	1:28.07	+4.31
4	Walter Kaelin	Switzerland	LW3	1:46.42	1:28.51	+4.75
5	Romain Riboud	France	LW5/7	1:34.71	1:28.79	+5.03
6	George Sansonetis	United States	LW5/7	1:38.99	1:32.81	+9.05
7	Jozef Mistina	Slovakia	LW5/7	1:40.47	1:34.27	+10.51
8	Mark Drinnan	Australia	LW5/7	1:41.60	1:35.33	+11.57
9	Jin Jeon Young	South Korea	LW9	1:37.63	1:35.99	+12.23
10	Mher Avanesyan	Armenia	LW9	1:37.78	1:36.14	+12.38
-	Hongbin Kim	South Korea	LW9	DSQ		

LW4

- LW4 – standing: single leg amputation below the knee

Rank	Name	Country	Class	Real Time	Calc Time	Difference
1st place, gold medalist(s)	Hans Burn	Switzerland	LW4	1:23.86	1:23.65	
2nd place, silver medalist(s)	James Lagerstrom	United States	LW4	1:24.42	1:24.20	+0.55
3rd place, bronze medalist(s)	Steven Bayley	New Zealand	LW4	1:25.13	1:24.91	+1.26
4	Michael Bruegger	Switzerland	LW4	1:25.86	1:25.64	+1.99
5	Robert Meusburger	Austria	LW4	1:26.18	1:25.96	+2.31
6	Manfred Auer	Austria	LW4	1:26.82	1:26.60	+2.95
7	Hubert Mandl	Austria	LW4	1:27.09	1:26.87	+3.22
8	Cedric Amafroi-Broisat	France	LW4	1:27.42	1:27.20	+3.55
9	Mark Ludbrook	Canada	LW4	1:28.24	1:28.01	+4.36
10	Clay Fox	United States	LW4	1:29.14	1:28.91	+5.26
11	Igor Kostenko	Russia	LW4	1:31.77	1:31.54	+7.89
12	Scott Adams	Australia	LW4	1:36.62	1:36.37	+12.72
-	Naoya Maruyama	Japan	LW4	DNF		

LW6/8

- LW6/8 – standing: single arm amputation

Rank	Name	Country	Class	Real Time	Calc Time	Difference
1st place, gold medalist(s)	Rolf Heinzmann	Switzerland	LW6/8	1:24.26	1:24.26	
2nd place, silver medalist(s)	Lionel Brun	France	LW6/8	1:24.27	1:24.27	+0.01
3rd place, bronze medalist(s)	Markus Pfefferle	Germany	LW6/8	1:24.70	1:24.70	+0.44
4	Ian Balfour	Canada	LW6/8	1:25.60	1:25.60	+1.34
5	Frank Pfortmueller	Germany	LW6/8	1:25.76	1:25.76	+1.50
6	Martin Cupka	Slovakia	LW6/8	1:26.17	1:26.17	+1.91
7	Adam Fromma	United States	LW6/8	1:26.30	1:26.30	+2.04
8	Wolfgang Moosbrugger	Austria	LW6/8	1:26.97	1:26.97	+2.71
9	Stanislav Loska	Czech Republic	LW6/8	1:27.37	1:27.37	+3.11
10	Walter Lackner	Austria	LW6/8	1:27.52	1:27.52	+3.26
11	Shinji Inoue	Japan	LW6/8	1:29.11	1:29.11	+4.85
12	Walter Kaelin	Switzerland	LW6/8	1:29.40	1:29.40	+5.14
13	Yasunori Todoroki	Japan	LW6/8	1:33.18	1:33.18	+8.92
