= Alpine skiing at the 2002 Winter Paralympics =

Alpine skiing at the VIII Paralympic Winter Games
- Venue: Snowbasin Ski Resort
- Dates: 8 to 16 March
- Competitors: 193 from 30 nations

Alpine skiing at the 2002 Winter Paralympics consisted of 53 events, 34 for men and 19 for women which all took place at the Snowbasin Ski Area.

== Medal table ==
| Rank | Nation | Gold | Silver | Bronze | Total |
|---|---|---|---|---|---|
| 1 | United States (USA) | 9 | 17 | 11 | 37 |
| 2 | Austria (AUT) | 9 | 8 | 9 | 26 |
| 3 | Germany (GER) | 8 | 0 | 6 | 14 |
| 4 | Australia (AUS) | 6 | 1 | 0 | 7 |
| 5 | Switzerland (SUI) | 5 | 4 | 0 | 9 |
| 6 | Canada (CAN) | 4 | 3 | 5 | 12 |
| 7 | New Zealand (NZL) | 4 | 0 | 2 | 6 |
| 8 | Spain (ESP) | 3 | 2 | 2 | 7 |
| 9 | France (FRA) | 2 | 7 | 3 | 12 |
| 10 | Czech Republic (CZE) | 2 | 1 | 2 | 5 |
| 11 | Italy (ITA) | 1 | 3 | 2 | 6 |
| 12 | Sweden (SWE) | 0 | 5 | 1 | 6 |
| 13 | Slovakia (SVK) | 0 | 1 | 5 | 6 |
| 14 | South Korea (KOR) | 0 | 1 | 0 | 1 |
| 15 | Japan (JPN) | 0 | 0 | 2 | 2 |
| 15 | Russia (RUS) | 0 | 0 | 2 | 2 |
| 17 | Norway (NOR) | 0 | 0 | 1 | 1 |
| Totals (17 entries) | | 53 | 53 | 53 | 159 |

== Medal summary ==
The competition events were:

- Downhill: men – women
- Super-G: men – women
- Giant slalom: men – women
- Slalom: men – women

Each event had separate standing, sitting, or visually impaired classifications:

- LW2 – standing: single leg amputation above the knee
- LW3 – standing: double leg amputation below the knee, mild cerebral palsy, or equivalent impairment
- LW4 – standing: single leg amputation below the knee
- LW5/7 – standing: double arm amputation
- LW6/8 – standing: single arm amputation
- LW9 – standing: amputation or equivalent impairment of one arm and one leg
- LW 10 – sitting: paraplegia with no or some upper abdominal function and no functional sitting balance
- LW 11 – sitting: paraplegia with fair functional sitting balance
- LW 12 – sitting: double leg amputation above the knees, or paraplegia with some leg function and good sitting balance
- B1 – visually impaired: no functional vision
- B2 – visually impaired: up to ca 3-5% functional vision
- B3 – visually impaired: under 10% functional vision

=== Men's events ===
| Event | Class | Gold | Silver | Bronze |
|---|---|---|---|---|
| Downhill | B1-3 | Bart Bunting; Guide: Nathan Chivers; Australia | Eric Villalon; Guide: Pere Comet; Spain | Yon Santacana; Guide: Raul Capdevila; Spain |
| Downhill | LW2 | Michael Milton; Australia | Christian Lanthaler; Italy | Jason Lalla; United States |
| Downhill | LW3,5/7,9 | Gerd Schoenfelder; Germany | Arno Hirschbuehl; Austria | Jacob Rife; United States |
| Downhill | LW4 | Hans Burn; Switzerland | James Lagerstrom; United States | Steven Bayley; New Zealand |
| Downhill | LW6/8 | Rolf Heinzmann; Switzerland | Lionel Brun; France | Markus Pfefferle; Germany |
| Downhill | LW10 | Martin Braxenthaler; Germany | Chris Waddell; United States | Ronny Persson; Sweden |
| Downhill | LW11 | Harald Eder; Austria | Andreas Schiestl; Austria | Fabrizio Zardini; Italy |
| Downhill | LW12 | Kevin Bramble; United States | Christopher Devlin-Young; United States | Daniel Wesley; Canada |
| Giant slalom | B1-2 | Eric Villalon; Guide: Pere Comet; Spain | Bart Bunting; Guide: Nathan Chivers; Australia | Radomir Dudas; Guide: Juraj Mikulas; Slovakia |
| Giant slalom | B3 | Yon Santacana; Guide: Raul Capdevila; Spain | Gianmaria Dal Maistro; Guide: Guido Lanaro; Italy | Andrew Parr; Guide: David Marchi; United States |
| Giant slalom | LW2 | Michael Milton; Australia | Jason Lalla; United States | Asle Tangvik; Norway |
| Giant slalom | LW3,5/7,9 | Gerd Schoenfelder; Germany | Romain Riboud; France | Arno Hirschbuehl; Austria |
| Giant slalom | LW4 | Steven Bayley; New Zealand | Hans Burn; Switzerland | Robert Meusburger; Austria |
| Giant slalom | LW6/8 | Rolf Heinzmann; Switzerland | Lionel Brun; France | Frank Pfortmueller; Germany |
| Giant slalom | LW10 | Martin Braxenthaler; Germany | Ronny Persson; Sweden | Chris Waddell; United States |
| Giant slalom | LW11 | Harald Eder; Austria | Juergen Egle; Austria | Andreas Schiestl; Austria |
| Giant slalom | LW12 | Hans Joerg Arnold; Switzerland | Sang Min Han; South Korea | Scott Patterson; Canada |
| Slalom | B1-2 | Eric Villalon; Guide: Pere Comet; Spain | Radomir Dudas; Guide: Juraj Mikulas; Slovakia | Stefan Kopcik; Guide: Branislav Mazgut; Slovakia |
| Slalom | B3 | Chris Williamson; Guide: Bill Harriott; Canada | Andrew Parr; Guide: David Marchi; United States | Norbert Holik; Guide: Radoslav Grus; Slovakia |
| Slalom | LW2 | Michael Milton; Australia | Monte Meier; United States | Michael Hipp; Germany |
| Slalom | LW3,5/7,9 | Gerd Schoenfelder; Germany | Arno Hirschbuehl; Austria | Alexei Moshkine; Russia |
| Slalom | LW4 | Hubert Mandl; Austria | Hans Burn; Switzerland | Martin Falch; Austria |
| Slalom | LW6/8 | Wolfgang Moosbrugger; Austria | Rolf Heinzmann; Switzerland | Lionel Brun; France |
| Slalom | LW10 | Martin Braxenthaler; Germany | Ronny Persson; Sweden | Chris Waddell; United States |
| Slalom | LW11 | Denis Barbet; France | Juergen Egle; Austria | Harald Eder; Austria |
| Slalom | LW12 | Daniel Wesley; Canada | Hans Joerg Arnold; Switzerland | Ludwig Wolf; Germany |
| Super-G | B1-3 | Bart Bunting; Guide: Nathan Chivers; Australia | Eric Villalon; Guide: Pere Comet; Spain | Yon Santacana; Guide: Raul Capdevila; Spain |
| Super-G | LW2 | Michael Milton; Australia | Christian Lanthaler; Italy | Florian Planker; Italy |
| Super-G | LW3,5/7,9 | Gerd Schoenfelder; Germany | Romain Riboud; France | Arno Hirschbuehl; Austria |
| Super-G | LW4 | Hubert Mandl; Austria | Josef Schoesswendter; Austria | Steven Bayley; New Zealand |
| Super-G | LW6/8 | Rolf Heinzmann; Switzerland | Lionel Brun; France | Wolfgang Moosbrugger; Austria |
| Super-G | LW10 | Martin Braxenthaler; Germany | Ronny Persson; Sweden | Michael Kroener; Germany |
| Super-G | LW11 | Fabrizio Zardini; Italy | Andreas Schiestl; Austria | Denis Barbet; France |
| Super-G | LW12 | Christopher Devlin-Young; United States | Daniel Wesley; Canada | Ludwig Wolf; Germany |

=== Women's events ===
| Event | Class | Gold | Silver | Bronze |
|---|---|---|---|---|
| Downhill | B2-3 | Pascale Casanova; Guide: Mikael Genin; France | Katerina Tepla; Guide: Renata Karamanova; Czech Republic | Gabriele Huemer; Guide: Maximilian Huemer; Austria |
| Downhill | LW2 | Danja Haslacher; Austria | Sarah Billmeier; United States | Inga Medvedeva; Russia |
| Downhill | LW3,4,6/8,9 | Rachael Battersby; New Zealand | Csilla Kristof; United States | Karolina Wisniewska; Canada |
| Downhill | LW10-12 | Sarah Will; United States | Muffy Davis; United States | Stephani Victor; United States |
| Super-G | B2-3 | Katerina Tepla; Guide: Renata Karamanova; Czech Republic | Gabriele Huemer; Guide: Maximilian Huemer; Austria | Pascale Casanova; Guide: Mikael Genin; France |
| Super-G | LW2 | Sarah Billmeier; United States | Allison Jones; United States | Sandy Dukat; United States |
| Super-G | LW3,4,6/8,9 | Lauren Woolstencroft; Canada | Mary Riddell; United States | Karolina Wisniewska; Canada |
| Super-G | LW10-12 | Sarah Will; United States | Muffy Davis; United States | Lacey Heward; United States |
| Giant slalom | B2-3 | Katerina Tepla; Guide: Renata Karamanova; Czech Republic | Pascale Casanova; Guide: Mikael Genin; France | Sabina Rogie; Guide: Michal Karasek; Czech Republic |
| Giant slalom | LW2 | Danja Haslacher; Austria | Allison Jones; United States | Nicola Lechner; Austria |
| Giant slalom | LW3,4,9 | Mary Riddell; United States | Karolina Wisniewska; Canada | Lauren Woolstencroft; Canada |
| Giant slalom | LW6/8 | Rachael Battersby; New Zealand | Csilla Kristof; United States | Iveta Chlebakova; Slovakia |
| Giant slalom | LW10-11 | Sarah Will; United States | Muffy Davis; United States | Lacey Heward; United States |
| Giant slalom | LW12 | Allison Pearl; United States | Cecilia Paulson; Sweden | Kuniko Obinata; Japan |
| Slalom | B2-3 | Gabriele Huemer; Guide: Maximilian Huemer; Austria | Pascale Casanova; Guide: Mikael Genin; France | Sabina Rogie; Guide: Michal Karasek; Czech Republic |
| Slalom | LW2 | Danja Haslacher; Austria | Sarah Billmeier; United States | Sandy Dukat; United States |
| Slalom | LW3,4,9 | Lauren Woolstencroft; Canada | Karolina Wisniewska; Canada | Jennifer Kelchner; United States |
| Slalom | LW6/8 | Rachael Battersby; New Zealand | Csilla Kristof; United States | Iveta Chlebakova; Slovakia |
| Slalom | LW10-12 | Sarah Will; United States | Cecilia Paulson; Sweden | Kuniko Obinata; Japan |

== See also ==
- Alpine skiing at the 2002 Winter Olympics
