= Nicola Lechner =

Austrian Paralympic skier

Sport
- Country: Austria
- Sport: Alpine skiing
Medal record
Alpine skiing
Representing Austria
Paralympic Games
Silver medal – second place	1998 Nagano	Downhill LW2
Silver medal – second place	1998 Nagano	Giant slalom LW2
Silver medal – second place	1998 Nagano	Slalom LW2
Bronze medal – third place	1998 Nagano	Super-G LW2
Bronze medal – third place	2002 Salt Lake City	Giant slalom LW2

Nicola Lechner is an Austrian Paralympic alpine skier. She represented Austria in Paralympic Alpine skiing at the 1998 Paralympic Winter Games in Nagano, and 2002 Paralympic Winter Games in Salt Lake City. She won a total of five medals: three silver medals and two bronze medals.

== Career ==
At the 1998 Paralympic Winter Games, in Nagano, Japan, Lechner took the podium in four events. She won silver in the slalom (in a time of 2:06.22, gold for Sarah Billmeier in 2:04.99 and bronze for Maggie Behle in 2: 08.14), giant slalom (with 2:49.10 Lechner overtook Sarah Billmeier in 2:49.44, but finished behind compatriot Danja Haslacher in 2:47.70), and downhill (in 1:14.95, she finished behind Sarah Billmeier, 1st place in 1:14.79, but ahead of Maggie Behle, in 3rd place in 1:18.04). She won a bronze medal in the super-G LW2 race, in 1:09.06 (gold for Danja Haslacher with a time of 1:08.80, and silver for Sarah Billmeier in 1: 09.04)ː

At 2002 Paralympic Winter Games, in Salt Lake City, in 2:32.95, Lechner finished 3rd in the LW2 giant slalom, behind compatriot Danja Haslacher in 2:24.85 and American Allison Jones in 2:32.55. She finished fourth in Women's downhill LW2, and Women's super-G LW2. She did not finish in the Women's slalom LW2.
