= Gabriele Huemer =

Austrian Paralympic alpine skier

Personal information
- Born: 18 March 1964 (age 62)

Sport
- Country: Austria
- Sport: Alpine skiing
Medal record
Alpine skiing
Representing Austria
Paralympic Games
Gold medal – first place	1994 Lillehammer	Super-G B1-2
Gold medal – first place	2002 Salt Lake City	Slalom B2-3
Silver medal – second place	1994 Lillehammer	Giant slalom B1-2
Silver medal – second place	2002 Salt Lake City	Super-G B2-3
Bronze medal – third place	2002 Salt Lake City	Downhill B2-3

Gabriele Huemer (born 18 March 1964) is an Austrian Paralympic alpine skier. She represented Austria in Paralympic Alpine skiing at the 1994 Winter Paralympics, and 2002 Winter Paralympics. She won five medals: two gold medals, two silver, and one bronze.

== Career ==
At the 1994 Winter Paralympics in Lillehammer, Norway, Huemer competed in two alpine skiing events, winning gold in the super-G B1-2, with a time of 1:18.89, and silver in the giant slalom, B1-2 (with a time of 2:52.48 she placed behind her compatriot Elisabeth Kellner in 2:50.31 and ahead of the Swedish athlete Åsa Bengtsson in 3:05.11).

At the 2002 Winter Paralympics in Salt Lake City, Huemer won gold in the slalom B2-3, with a time of 1:50.74), a silver in the super-G B2-3, and a bronze in downhill B2-3. She also competed in the giant slalom B2-3, where she did not finish.
