= Mary Riddell (skier) =

American Paralympic alpine skier

Personal information
- Born: 1980 (age 45–46) Dolores, Colorado, United States
- Home town: Dove Creek, Colorado, United States

Sport
- Country: United States
- Sport: Alpine skiing
- Retired: 2003
Medal record
Alpine skiing
Representing United States
Paralympic Games
Gold medal – first place	1998 Nagano	Giant slalom LW3,4,5/7,6/8
Gold medal – first place	2002 Salt Lake City	Giant slalom LW3,4,9
Silver medal – second place	1998 Nagano	Downhill LW3,4,6/8
Silver medal – second place	2002 Salt Lake City	Super-G LW3,4,6/8,9
Bronze medal – third place	1998 Nagano	Slalom LW3,4,5/7,6/8
Bronze medal – third place	1998 Nagano	Super-G LW3,4,5/7,6/8

Mary Riddell (born 1980) is an American Paralympic alpine skier. In 2017, she was inducted in the U.S. Disabled Snow Sports Hall of Fame.

She represented the United States in para-alpine skiing at the 1998 Winter Paralympics in Nagano and 2002 Winter Paralympics in Salt Lake City. She won six medals including two gold, two silver and two bronzes.

== Career ==
Riddell won the gold medal in the LW3,4,5 / 7,6 giant slalom competition, with a time of 2:41.35, better than opponents Karolina Wisniewska (2: 41.82) and Ramona Hoh (2: 42.06), at the 1998 Nagano Winter Paralympics. In the LW3,4,6 / 8 downhill event, she finished second in 1: 15.00, behind her compatriot Jennifer Kelchner in 1: 14.97. She won two bronze medals in the slalom (achieved time 2: 04.17), and super-G LW3,4,5 / 7,6 / 8 (in 1: 05.80).

At the 2002 Paralympic Winter Games in Salt Lake City, Riddell won the gold medal in the giant slalom LW3,4,9 (silver medal for Karolina Wisniewska and bronze for Lauren Woolstencroft), and silver in the alpine super combined LW3,4,6 / 8,9 (in 1st place Woolstencroft and in 3rd place Wisniewska). She placed in 4th place in the downhill category LW3,4,6 / 8,9; while on the podium were Rachael Battersby in 1: 30.63, Csilla Kristof in 1: 31.41 and Karolina Wisniewska in 1: 32.19.

She finished second in giant slalom at the 2000 Hartford Ski Spectacular, behind Sarah Will.
