= 2002 Winter Paralympics medal table =

2002 Winter Paralympics medals
- Location: Salt Lake City, United States

Highlights
- Most gold medals: Germany (17)
- Most total medals: United States (43)
- Medalling NPCs: 22

The 2002 Winter Paralympics medal table is a list of National Paralympic Committees (NPCs) ranked by the number of gold medals won by their athletes during the 2002 Winter Paralympics, held in Salt Lake City, Utah, United States, from March 7 to March 16, 2002.

== Medal table ==
The ranking in this table is based on information provided by the International Paralympic Committee (IPC) and is consistent with IPC convention in its published medal tables. By default, the table is ordered by the number of gold medals the athletes from a nation have won (in this context, a "nation" is an entity represented by a National Paralympic Committee). The number of silver medals is taken into consideration next and then the number of bronze medals. If nations are still tied, equal ranking is given and they are listed alphabetically by IPC country code.

To sort this table by nation, total medal count, or any other column, click on the icon next to the column title.

* Host nation (United States)

Rank	Nation	Gold	Silver	Bronze	Total
1	Germany	17	1	15	33
2	United States*	10	22	11	43
3	Norway	10	3	6	19
4	Austria	9	10	10	29
5	Russia	7	9	5	21
6	Canada	6	4	5	15
7	Switzerland	6	4	2	12
8	Australia	6	1	0	7
9	Finland	4	1	3	8
10	New Zealand	4	0	2	6
11	Italy	3	3	3	9
12	Spain	3	2	2	7
13	France	2	11	6	19
14	Czech Republic	2	1	2	5
15	Netherlands	1	3	0	4
16	Belarus	1	1	0	2
17	Poland	1	0	2	3
18	Ukraine	0	6	6	12
19	Sweden	0	6	3	9
20	Slovakia	0	3	6	9
21	South Korea	0	1	0	1
22	Japan	0	0	3	3
Totals (22 entries)		92	92	92	276

== See also ==
- 2002 Winter Olympics medal table
