= China at the 2002 Winter Paralympics =

- IPC code: CHN
- NPC: China Administration of Sports for Persons with Disabilities
- Website: www.caspd.org.cn

in Salt Lake City
- Competitors: 4
- Medals: Gold 0 Silver 0 Bronze 0 Total 0

Winter Paralympics appearances (overview)
- 2002; 2006; 2010; 2014; 2018; 2022; 2026

China participated in the eighth Winter Paralympics in Salt Lake City, United States. This was its Winter Paralympics debut.

== Athletes ==
China entered one athlete in alpine skiing and three in cross-country skiing.

== Medalists ==
| | (gold) | (silver) | (bronze) | Total |
|---|---|---|---|---|
| China | 0 | 0 | 0 | 0 |

== See also ==
- China at the 2002 Winter Olympics
