= Josef Schößwendter =

Austrian para-alpine skier (born 1966)

Personal information
- Born: 14 January 1966 (age 60) Maria Alm, Austria

Sport
- Country: Austria
- Sport: Para-alpine skiing
Medal record
Paralympic Games
Silver medal – second place	2002 Salt Lake City	Super-G LW4

Josef Schößwendter (born 14 January 1966) is an Austrian para-alpine skier. He represented Austria at three Winter Paralympics: in 1998, 2002 and 2006.

In 2002, he won the silver medal in the Men's Super-G LW4 event.

== See also ==
- List of Paralympic medalists in alpine skiing
