= Xavier Barios =

Andorran para-alpine skier

Xavier Barios is an Andorran paralympic skier.

== Career ==
Barios has competed in two Paralympic Games. First, in 2002, where he competed in the LW10 class giant slalom and slalom, failing to finish either event. He returned four years later in Turin for the 2006 edition, where he competed in the seated skiing events. He again failed to finish in the slalom, but picked up a 40th place in the giant slalom.
