= Allison Pearl =

American para-alpine skier

Sport
- Country: United States
- Sport: Alpine skiing
Medal record
Paralympic Games
Gold medal – first place	2002 Salt Lake City	Giant Slalom LW12

Allison Pearl is an American para-alpine skier. She represented the United States at the 2002 Winter Paralympics in alpine skiing.

She won the gold medal in the Women's Giant Slalom LW12 event. She also competed in the Women's Super-G LW10-12 event and the Women's Slalom LW10-12 but she did not finish in either event.
