= Christian Lanthaler =

Italian para-alpine skier (born 1966)

Personal information
- Born: October 26, 1966 (age 59) Moos in Passeier, Italy

Sport
- Country: Italy
- Sport: Paralympic alpine skiing
Medal record
Paralympic Games
Silver medal – second place	2002 Salt Lake City	Downhill LW2
Silver medal – second place	2002 Salt Lake City	Super-G LW2

Christian Lanthaler is an Italian para-alpine skier. He represented Italy at seven Winter Paralympics: in 1992, 1994, 1998, 2002, 2006, 2010 and 2014. In total he won two silver medals in 2002: in the Men's Downhill LW2 event and in the Men's Super-G LW2 event.

He also competed in the 2011 IPC Alpine Skiing World Championships held in Sestriere, Italy but did not win a medal.
