= Denis Barbet =

French para-alpine skier

Sport
- Country: France
- Sport: Para-alpine skiing
Medal record
Paralympic Games
Gold medal – first place	2002 Salt Lake City	Slalom LW11
Bronze medal – third place	2002 Salt Lake City	Super-G LW11
Bronze medal – third place	2006 Turin	Downhill Sitting

Denis Barbet is a French para-alpine skier. He represented France at the 2002 Winter Paralympics and at the 2006 Winter Paralympics.

In 2002 he won the gold medal in the Men's Slalom LW11 event and the bronze medal in the Men's Super-G LW11 event.

In 2006 he won the bronze medal in the Men's Downhill Sitting event.

== See also ==
- List of Paralympic medalists in alpine skiing
