= Romain Riboud =

French para-alpine skier (born 1982)

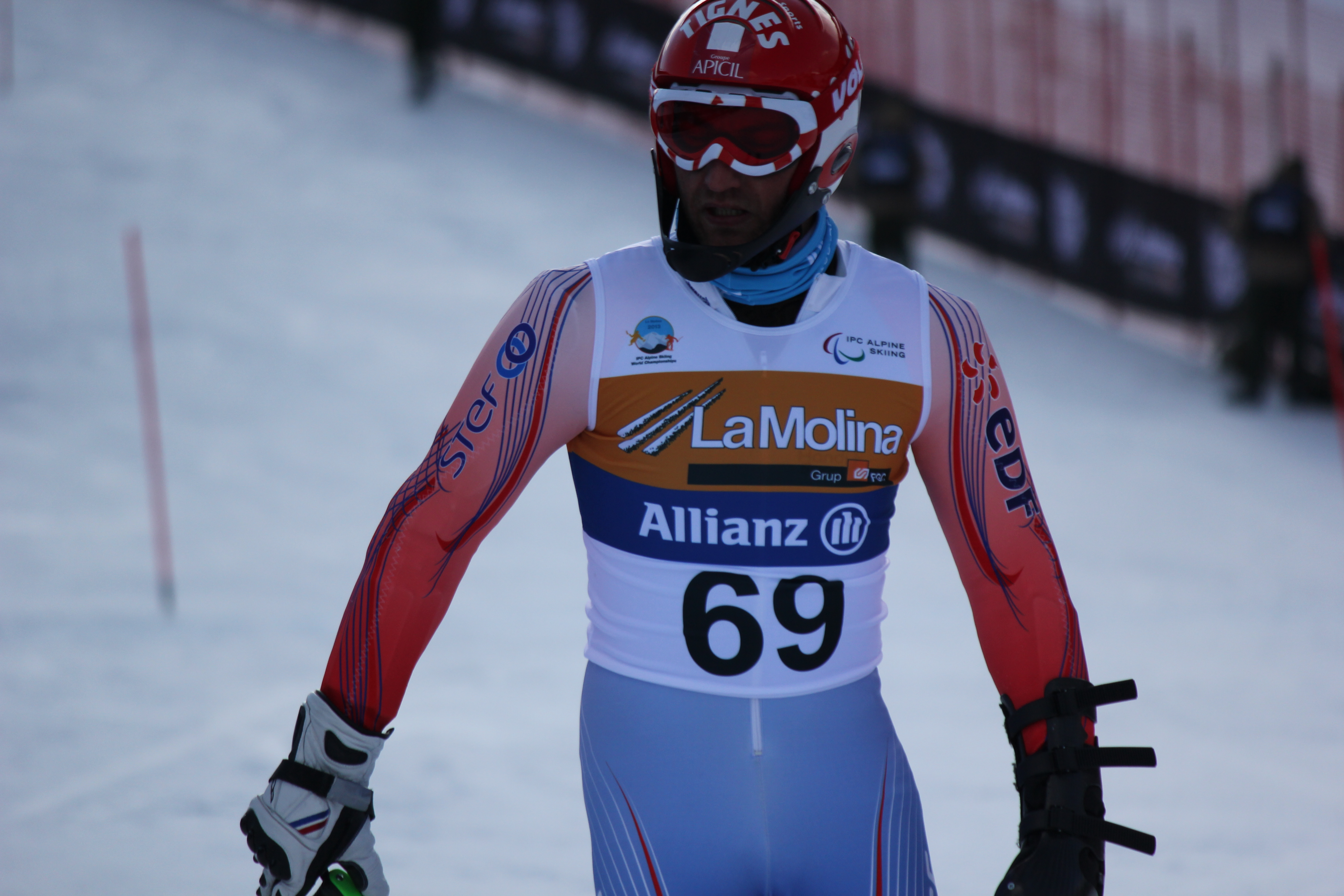

Personal information
- Born: 2 June 1982 (age 44) Albertville, Savoie, France
- Education: Emlyon Business School

Sport
- Country: France
- Sport: Para-alpine skiing
- Disability: Cerebral palsy
Medal record
Paralympic Games
Silver medal – second place	2002 Salt Lake City	Giant Slalom LW3,5/7,9
Silver medal – second place	2002 Salt Lake City	Super-G LW3,5/7,9

Romain Riboud (born 2 June 1982 in Albertville) is a French para-alpine skier. He represented France at four Winter Paralympics: in 2002, 2006, 2010 and 2014. In 2002, he won the silver medals in the Men's Giant Slalom LW3,5/7,9 and the Men's Super-G LW3,5/7,9 events.

== See also ==
- List of Paralympic medalists in alpine skiing
