= Fabrizio Zardini =

Italian para-alpine skier (1967–2024)

Personal information
- Born: 28 January 1967 Cortina d'Ampezzo, Italy
- Died: 30 April 2024 (aged 57) Belluno, Italy

Sport
- Country: Italy
- Sport: Paralympic alpine skiing
Medal record
Paralympic Games
Gold medal – first place	2002 Salt Lake City	Super-G LW11
Bronze medal – third place	2002 Salt Lake City	Downhill LW11

Fabrizio Zardini (28 January 1967 – 30 April 2024) was an Italian para-alpine skier. He represented Italy in cross-country skiing at the 1992 Winter Paralympics. He then moved to alpine skiing and represented Italy in alpine skiing at the 1998, 2002 and 2006 Winter Paralympics. In 2002, he won the gold medal in the Men's Super-G LW11 event and the bronze medal in the Men's Downhill LW11 event. Zardini died on 30 April 2024, at the age of 57.
