= Andrew Parr =

American para-alpine skier

Sport
- Country: United States
- Sport: Alpine skiing
Medal record
Paralympic Games
Silver medal – second place	2002 Salt Lake City	Slalom B3
Bronze medal – third place	2002 Salt Lake City	Giant Slalom B3

Andrew Parr is an American para-alpine skier. He represented the United States at the 2002 Winter Paralympics and at the 2006 Winter Paralympics in alpine skiing.

In 2002, he won the silver medal in the Men's Slalom B3 event and the bronze medal in the Men's Giant Slalom B3 event.
