= Lacey Heward =

American para-alpine skier

Sport
- Country: United States
- Sport: Alpine skiing
Medal record
Paralympic Games
| Bronze medal – third place | 2002 Salt Lake City | Giant Slalom LW10-11 |
| Bronze medal – third place | 2002 Salt Lake City | Super-G LW10-12 |

Lacey Heward is an American para-alpine skier. She represented the United States at the 2002 Winter Paralympics and at the 2006 Winter Paralympics in alpine skiing.

In 2002, she won two bronze medals: in the Women's Giant Slalom LW10-11 event and in the Women's Super-G LW10-12 event.

== Achievements ==
| Year | Competition | Location | Position | Event | Time |
|---|---|---|---|---|---|
| 2002 | 2002 Winter Paralympics | Salt Lake City, United States | 3rd | Women's Giant Slalom LW10-11 | 2:37.82 |
| 2002 | 2002 Winter Paralympics | Salt Lake City, United States | 3rd | Women's Super-G LW10-12 | 1:22.20 |
