= Scott Patterson (Paralympian) =

Canadian athlete (born 1961)

Personal information
- Nationality: Canadian
- Born: December 23, 1961 (age 64) Vancouver, Canada

Sport
- Country: Canada
- Sport: Track athletics; Alpine skiing; Swimming
Medal record
Men's Alpine skiing
Representing Canada
Paralympic Games
Bronze medal – third place	Alpine skiing	Men's giant slalom LW12

Scott Patterson (born December 23, 1961) is a Canadian athlete who has appeared in four Paralympic Games in three different sports.

Patterson is a double leg amputee injured in a work accident in 1982. He competed in four events in track athletics in the 1988 Summer Paralympics in Seoul, South Korea, his best result being fifth.

His next appearance was not until the 2002 Winter Paralympics in Salt Lake City, where he entered 3 alpine skiing events, winning a bronze medal in the Men's giant slalom LW12. He skied again in 2006 in Turin, but his best result was a 20th place.

In the 2012 Summer Paralympics in London he appeared for the first time as a swimmer, taking 8th place in the final of the 100 metre breaststroke SB5.

== Bibliography ==
- Scott Patterson - Profile - Canadian Paralympic Committee
