= Csilla Kristof =

American para-alpine skier

Sport
- Country: United States
- Sport: Alpine skiing
Medal record
Paralympic Games
Silver medal – second place	2002 Salt Lake City	Downhill LW3,4,6/8,9
Silver medal – second place	2002 Salt Lake City	Giant Slalom LW6/8
Silver medal – second place	2002 Salt Lake City	Slalom LW6/8

Csilla Kristof is an American para-alpine skier. She represented the United States at the 2002 Winter Paralympics in alpine skiing.

She won three silver medals: in the Women's Downhill LW3,4,6/8,9 event, in the Women's Giant Slalom LW6/8 event and in the Women's Slalom LW6/8 event.
