= United States at the 2002 Winter Paralympics =

- Flag of the United States
- IPC code: USA
- NPC: United States Paralympic Committee
- Website: www.teamusa.org/US-Paralympics

in Salt Lake City
- Competitors: 57 in 4 sports
- Medals Ranked 2nd: Gold 10 Silver 22 Bronze 11 Total 43

Winter Paralympics appearances (overview)
- 1976; 1980; 1984; 1988; 1992; 1994; 1998; 2002; 2006; 2010; 2014; 2018; 2022; 2026

The United States was the host nation for the 2002 Winter Paralympics in Salt Lake City. A total of 57 U.S. competitors (41 male and 16 female) took part in all four sports. The United States finished second in the gold medal and first in the total medal count.

== Medalists ==
The following American athletes won medals at the games. In the 'by discipline' sections below, medalists' names are in bold.

| Medal | Name | Sport | Event |
|---|---|---|---|
| Gold | Sarah Billmeier | Alpine skiing | Women's super-G LW2 |
| Gold | Kevin Bramble | Alpine skiing | Men's downhill LW12 |
| Gold | Chris Devlin-Young | Alpine skiing | Men's super-G LW12 |
| Gold | Allison Pearl | Alpine skiing | Women's giant slalom LW12 |
| Gold | Mary Riddell | Alpine skiing | Women's giant slalom LW3,4,9 |
| Gold | Sarah Will | Alpine skiing | Women's downhill LW10-12 |
| Gold | Sarah Will | Alpine skiing | Women's giant slalom LW10-11 |
| Gold | Sarah Will | Alpine skiing | Women's slalom LW10-12 |
| Gold | Sarah Will | Alpine skiing | Women's super-G LW10-12 |
| Gold | United States national sled hockey team: Patrick Byrne; David Conklin; Matt Coppens; James Dunham; Sylvester Flis; Manuel Guerra Jr.; Lonnie Hannah; Dan Henderson; Joe Howard; Christopher Manns; Brian Ruhe; Jack Sanders; Pat Sapp; Kip St. Germaine; Josh Wirt | Ice sled hockey | Men's team |
| Silver | Robert Balk | Cross-country skiing | Men's 10 km sitski LW12 |
| Silver | Robert Balk; Steve Cook; William Stewart | Cross-country skiing | Men's 1x2.5/2x5 km relay open |
| Silver | Sarah Billmeier | Alpine skiing | Women's downhill LW2 |
| Silver | Sarah Billmeier | Alpine skiing | Women's slalom LW2 |
| Silver | Steve Cook | Cross-country skiing | Men's 5 km classical technique LW2-4 |
| Silver | Steve Cook | Cross-country skiing | Men's 10 km free technique LW2-4 |
| Silver | Steve Cook | Cross-country skiing | Men's 20 km free technique standing |
| Silver | Muffy Davis | Alpine skiing | Women's downhill LW10-12 |
| Silver | Muffy Davis | Alpine skiing | Women's giant slalom LW10-11 |
| Silver | Muffy Davis | Alpine skiing | Women's super-G LW10-12 |
| Silver | Chris Devlin-Young | Alpine skiing | Men's downhill LW12 |
| Silver | Allison Jones | Alpine skiing | Women's giant slalom LW2 |
| Silver | Allison Jones | Alpine skiing | Women's super-G LW2 |
| Silver | Csilla Kristof | Alpine skiing | Women's downhill LW3,4,6/8,9 |
| Silver | Csilla Kristof | Alpine skiing | Women's giant slalom LW6/8 |
| Silver | Csilla Kristof | Alpine skiing | Women's slalom LW6/8 |
| Silver | James Lagerstrom | Alpine skiing | Men's downhill LW4 |
| Silver | Jason Lalla | Alpine skiing | Men's giant slalom LW2 |
| Silver | Monte Meier | Alpine skiing | Men's slalom LW2 |
| Silver | Andrew Parr | Alpine skiing | Men's slalom B3 |
| Silver | Mary Riddell | Alpine skiing | Women's super-G LW3,4,6/8,9 |
| Silver | Chris Waddell | Alpine skiing | Men's downhill LW10 |
| Bronze | Sandy Dukat | Alpine skiing | Women's slalom LW2 |
| Bronze | Sandy Dukat | Alpine skiing | Women's super-G LW2 |
| Bronze | Lacey Heward | Alpine skiing | Women's giant slalom LW10-11 |
| Bronze | Lacey Heward | Alpine skiing | Women's super-G LW10-12 |
| Bronze | Jennifer Kelchner | Alpine skiing | Women's slalom LW3,4,9 |
| Bronze | Jason Lalla | Alpine skiing | Men's downhill LW2 |
| Bronze | Andrew Parr | Alpine skiing | Men's giant slalom B3 |
| Bronze | Jacob Rife | Alpine skiing | Men's downhill LW3,5/7,9 |
| Bronze | Stephani Victor | Alpine skiing | Women's downhill LW10-12 |
| Bronze | Chris Waddell | Alpine skiing | Men's giant slalom LW10 |
| Bronze | Chris Waddell | Alpine skiing | Men's slalom LW10 |

== See also ==
- United States at the 2002 Winter Olympics
