= Rachael Battersby =

New Zealand para-alpine skier

Personal information
- Nationality: New Zealand
Medal record
Women's para alpine skiing
Representing New Zealand
Paralympic Games
| Gold medal – first place | 2002 Salt Lake City | Slalom LW6/8 |
| Gold medal – first place | 2002 Salt Lake City | Giant Slalom LW6/8 |
| Gold medal – first place | 2002 Salt Lake City | Downhill LW3,4,6/8,9 |

Rachael Battersby is a Paralympic medalist from New Zealand who competed in alpine skiing. She competed in the 2002 Winter Paralympics where she won three gold medals in Slalom LW6/8, Giant Slalom LW6/8, and Downhill LW3,4,6/8,9.
