= Jennifer Kelchner =

American para-alpine skier

Sport
- Country: United States
- Sport: Para-alpine skiing
Medal record
Paralympic Games
Gold medal – first place	1998 Nagano	Downhill LW3,4,6/8
Bronze medal – third place	2002 Salt Lake City	Slalom LW3,4,9

Jennifer Kelchner is an American para-alpine skier. She represented the United States at the 1998 Winter Paralympics and at the 2002 Winter Paralympics in alpine skiing.

In 1998 she won the gold medal in the Women's Downhill LW3,4,6/8 event and in 2002 she won the bronze medal in the Women's Slalom LW3,4,9 event.
