= Eric Villalon =

Spanish para-alpine skier (born 1973)

Eric Villalón Fuentes
- Born: April 30, 1973 (age 53); Barcelona
- Occupation: Alpine skiing

Eric Villalón Fuentes (born 30 April 1973 in Barcelona) is a Paralympic alpine skier from Spain. In his career, he has won five gold medals, three silvers, and a bronze. At the 1998 Winter Paralympics he won three golds, at the 2002 games he won two gold and two silvers, and at the 2006 Paralympics he won a silver and a bronze.

In 2014 Villalon was inducted into the Paralympic Hall of Fame.
