= Karolina Wisniewska =

Canadian Para-alpine standing skier

Personal information
- Nationality: Canada
- Born: 26 July 1976 (age 49) Warsaw, Poland

Sport
- Country: Canada
- Sport: Para-alpine skiing
- Event(s): Downhill; Super-G; Giant Slalom; Slalom; Super Combined
- Club: Sunshine Ski Club

Achievements and titles
- Paralympic finals: 1998 Winter Paralympics; 2002 Winter Paralympics; 2010 Winter Paralympics
Medal record
Silver medal – second place	1998 Nagano	Giant Slalom
Silver medal – second place	1998 Nagano	Super-G
Silver medal – second place	2002 Salt Lake City	Giant Slalom
Silver medal – second place	2002 Salt Lake City	Slalom
Bronze medal – third place	2002 Salt Lake City	Downhill
Bronze medal – third place	2002 Salt Lake City	Super-G
Bronze medal – third place	2010 Vancouver	Slalom - Standing
Bronze medal – third place	2010 Vancouver	Super Combined- Standing

Karolina Wisniewska (born July 26, 1976) is a para-alpine standing skier. Born in Warsaw, she moved to Canada when she was 5 years old where she then took up skiing as a form of physical therapy for her cerebral palsy. Over the course of her skiing career, she won eight total Paralympic medals for skiing, and 18 medals at International Paralympic Committee (IPC) World Cups. At the 2002 Winter Paralympics, she earned four medals, the most ever earned by a Canadian para-alpine skier at a single Games. Wisniewska retired from the sport for a second time in May 2012 following an injury in 2011 that resulted in her missing most of the 2011/2012 skiing season.

== Early life ==
Wisniewska was born on July 26, 1976, in Warsaw, Poland and moved to Alberta, Canada when she was five years old. She was living in the Vancouver area in 2010, but was back in Calgary by 2012.

Born with cerebral palsy which affects her legs and balance, Wisniewska took a break from skiing at one point in order to attend Oxford University. In 2007, she was inducted into the Canadian Ski Hall of Fame. In 2012, she was working as a senior program officer in the higher performance division of Sport Canada. In 2017, Wisniewska was inducted into the Canadian Paralympic Committee's Hall of Fame.

== Skiing ==
Wisniewska is a para-alpine standing skier, who took up the sport when she was five years old as part of physical therapy for her cerebral palsy. In 1994, she joined the Alberta Disabled Alpine Team, the first time she participated in skiing on the para-sport side. Prior to this, she belonged to the Banff, Alberta based Sunshine Ski Club. Over the course of her skiing career, she won eight total Paralympic medals for skiing, and 18 medals at International Paralympic Committee (IPC) World Cups.

In 1995, Wisniewska won every event in her class at the national championships and made her national team debut. The following year, she earned a gold medal at the World Championships in Super-G in Lech, Austria. She first represented Canada at the Winter Paralympics in 1998, she won a pair of silver medals in the Women's Giant Slalom LW3,4,5/7,6/8 event and the Women's Super-G LW3,4,5/7,6/8 event. At the 2002 Winter Paralympics, she won four medals: two silvers and two bronzes. The silvers were in the Women's Giant Slalom LW3, LW4, LW9 event and Women's Slalom LW3,4,9 event. Her bronze medals were in the Women's Downhill LW3,4,6/8,9 event and the Women's Super-G LW3,4,6/8,9 event. Her four medals were the most ever one by a Canadian para-alpine skier at a single Paralympic Games. In 2003, she won the IPC World Cup Crystal Globe, which meant she was the overall IPC World Cup Champion for that year.

In 2004, Wisniewska retired from skiing for the first time following a concussion. She came out of retirement in 2007 in order to attempt to make the Canadian team for a home hosted Winter Paralympic Games in 2010. At the Korean hosted 2008 IPC World Cup, she finished sixth at the slalom event with a combined time of 2:31.26. The 2010 Winter Paralympics were her third Paralympics. She competed in the slalom, finishing in fourth following her first run and third in her second run in a round that saw one of the skiers ahead of her disqualified for skiing off the course. Wisniewska ended up with a bronze in the event, on a combined time of 1:58.84. Her finish coupled with teammate Lauren Woolstencroft's gold medal finish resulted in Canada's first double podium at the 2010 Games. Her second bronze medal of the Games was in the Super Combined.

At the 2011 IPC World Championships, Wisniewska won a pair of bronze medals in the slalom and super combined events. In February 2011, she injured herself during a downhill race. In May 2012, she announced her retirement from the sport following an injury that kept her out of the sport for most of the 2011/2012 ski season.
