= Stephani Victor =

American paralympican alpine skier

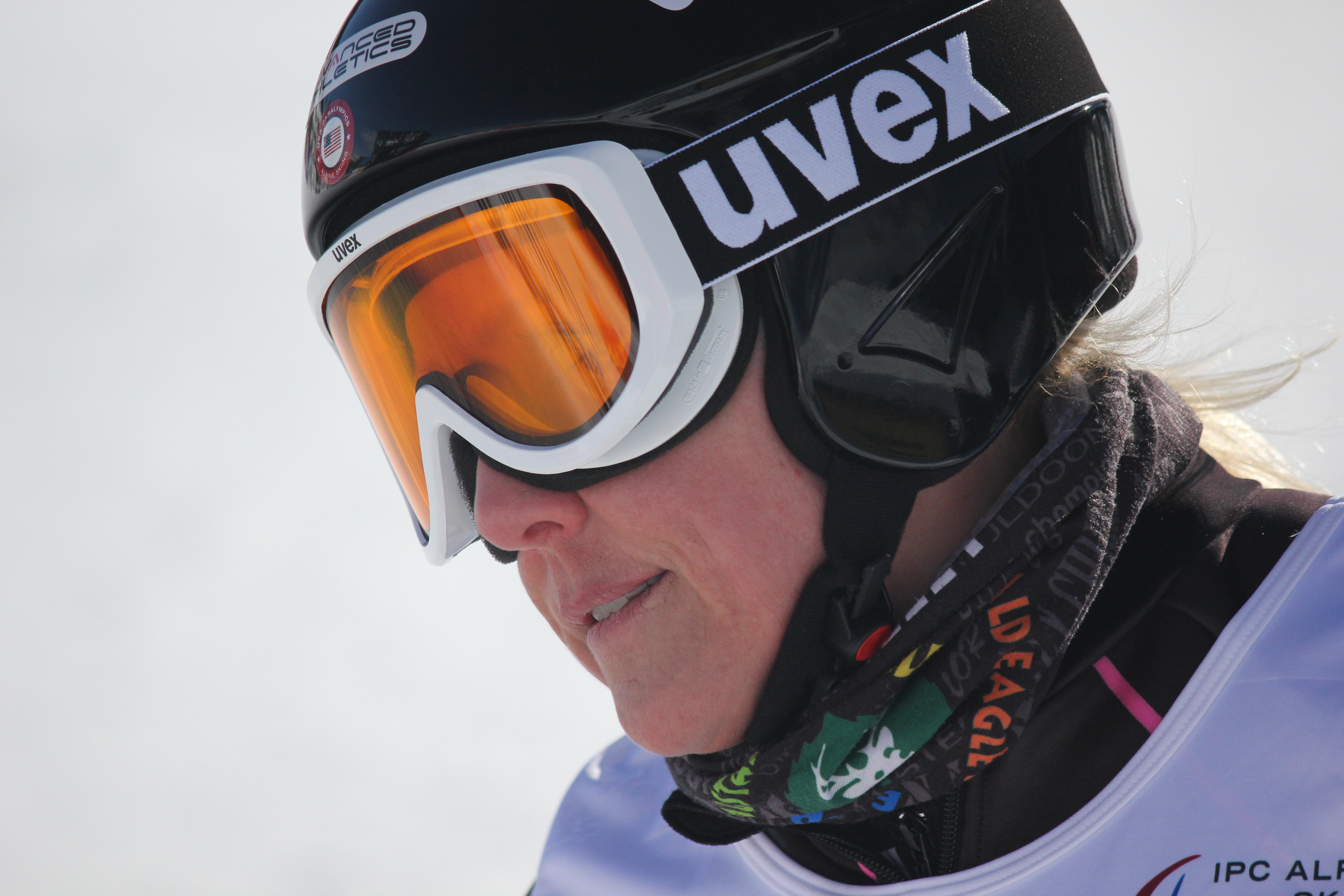
- at 2013 IPC Alpine World Championships in La Molina, Spain

Personal information
- Born: August 29, 1969 (age 56) Ames, Iowa, U.S.

Skiing career
- Sport: Alpine skiing
Medal record
Women's para alpine skiing
Representing United States
Paralympic Games
Bronze medal – third place	2002 Salt Lake City	Downhill
Gold medal – first place	2006 Torino	Slalom
Gold medal – first place	2010 Vancouver	Sitting combined
Silver medal – second place	2010 Vancouver	Sitting slalom
Silver medal – second place	2010 Vancouver	Sitting giant slalom

Stephani Victor (born August 29, 1969) is an LW 12–2 alpine skier Paralympic multi medalist.

== Early life and education ==
Stephani Victor was born on August 29, 1969, in Ames, Iowa. She finished high school in Sewickley, Pennsylvania and graduated from a film studies program at the University of Southern California in 1992.

== Personal life ==
Stephani Victor lost her legs after she was pinned between two cars. "The seemingly insurmountable challenge of no longer having legs was so difficult and extreme beyond my imagination that it forced me to fight to maintain my independence. The fight began with a single pull-up in my hospital bed and evolved into a relentless search for the sport I could dedicate myself to." That search led her to Marcel Kuonen, then-head coach at the National Ability Center in Park City, Utah. Kuonen, himself a former Swiss Ski Team racer, saw Victor's potential and sparked in her the vision to recreate herself as the best alpine ski racer in the world, despite having no legs. Their teamwork and partnership developed into a lifelong committed union, and in 2004, on a glacier in Zermatt, Switzerland, Kuonen proposed to Victor. They married in Deer Valley, Utah, in 2005. "Living her life like it's golden".

== Career ==
Competing at the 2010 Winter Paralympics, she won a gold medal in the women's super combined sitting event. She also won silver medals in the women's sitting slalom and the women's sitting giant slalom.

== Awards and honours ==
Victor was named the Paralympic Sportswoman of the year by the United States Olympic Committee in 2009.
