= Lauren Woolstencroft =

Canadian para-alpine skier (born 1981)

Medal record

Women's para alpine skiing

Representing Canada

Paralympic Games
Gold medal – first place	2002 Salt Lake City	Super-G
Gold medal – first place	2002 Salt Lake City	Slalom
Gold medal – first place	2006 Turin	Giant slalom
Gold medal – first place	2010 Vancouver	Slalom – Standing
Gold medal – first place	2010 Vancouver	Giant slalom- Standing
Gold medal – first place	2010 Vancouver	Downhill - Standing
Gold medal – first place	2010 Vancouver	Super-G - Standing
Gold medal – first place	2010 Vancouver	Super combined - Standing
Silver medal – second place	2006 Turin	Super-G
Bronze medal – third place	2002 Salt Lake City	Giant slalom

Lauren Woolstencroft (born November 24, 1981, in Calgary, Alberta) is a Canadian alpine skier and electrical engineer. Born missing her left arm below the elbow as well as both legs below the knees, she began skiing at the age of 4 and began competitive skiing at the age of 14. She is an eight-time gold medal winner at the Paralympics. In 1998, she was nicknamed "Pudding" by her teammates, due to her sweet tooth. Her life and achievements were celebrated in the Toyota ad "Good Odds" that aired just after kickoff during Super Bowl LII in February 2018.

== Career ==
Woolstencroft represented Canada at the 2002 Winter Paralympics in Salt Lake City, winning two gold medals and a bronze. She represented her country again at the 2006 Games in Turin, winning gold in the giant slalom and silver in the Super G. For her performance at the 2006 Games Woolstencroft was named Best Female at the Paralympic Sport Awards. She had contemplated retiring after the 2006 Games, but decided to stick around through the 2010 Games in Canada.

In the 2010 Winter Paralympics Woolstencroft won 5 gold medals for Giant slalom, slalom, super-G, downhill Skiing, and Super Combined. She became the first Canadian to win 3 golds at the same Winter Paralympics, this total was later increased to 5 golds. With her 4th gold medal, she helped Canada set a record for most gold medals at any Winter Paralympic Games by winning the 7th medal. The previous mark was six, set at the 2002 Salt Lake City Paralympics. With her 5th gold medal, she set the record for most gold medals won by any Winter Paralympian at a single Games, and she tied the record for gold medal haul of any Canadian Paralympian at a single Games, tying Chantal Petitclerc (who did the feat twice) and Stephanie Dixon, both Summer Paralympians. Her five gold are also the record for any Canadian Winter Paralympian or Olympian.

=== Other work ===
Woolstencroft graduated with an electrical engineering degree from the University of Victoria. She now resides in North Vancouver.

== Broadcasting career ==
In March 2018, she joined CBC's Broadcasting team for the 2018 Winter Paralympics from March 9 to March 18.

== Personal life ==
In November 2016, she and her husband Derek Uddenberg welcomed their first child Maxwell Davis Uddenberg.

== Awards and honours ==
Woolstencroft won the Whang Youn Dai Achievement Award in 2002.

In 2007, during the International Paralympic Committee's General Assembly in Seoul, Woolstencroft was named the Paralympic Sport Awards 2007 Best Female Athlete.

She was inducted into the Terry Fox Hall of Fame in 2007.

She was inducted into Canada's Sports Hall of Fame in 2011.

In 2012 Woolstencroft was awarded the Queen Elizabeth II Diamond Jubilee Medal.

In 2015, she was inducted into the Canadian Paralympic Hall of Fame of the Canadian Paralympic Committee.
