= Marianna Davis =

American politician and Paralympic gold medalist from Idaho

Member of the Idaho House of Representatives from the 26A district
- In office December 1, 2018 – December 3, 2021
- Preceded by: Steve Miller
- Succeeded by: Ned Burns

Personal details
- Born: December 1, 1972 (age 53) Sun Valley, Idaho
- Party: Democratic
- Spouse: Jeff Burley
- Children: 1
- Education: Stanford University (BS)
- Website: none
- Nickname: Muffy
- Cycling career
- Sport: Cycling
Medal record
Athletics
Representing United States
Winter Paralympic Games
Bronze medal – third place	1998 Nagano	Women's slalom
Silver medal – second place	2002 Salt Lake City	Women's giant slalom
Silver medal – second place	2002 Salt Lake City	Women's super G
Silver medal – second place	2002 Salt Lake City	Women's downhill
Summer Paralympic Games
Gold medal – first place	2012 London	Women's Individual H1-3 Road Race
Gold medal – first place	2012 London	Women's Individual H1-4 Team Relay
Gold medal – first place	2012 London	Women's Individual H1-2 individual time trial
World Championships
Gold medal – first place	2000 Anzère	Women's Giant Slalom

Marianna "Muffy" Davis (born December 1, 1972) is an American politician, former Paralympic cyclist, and alpine skier who served as a member of the Idaho House of Representatives for the 26A district from 2018 to 2021.

== Early life and education ==
Davis was born in Sun Valley, Idaho. She was a top ranking junior skier and was poised to be named to the US ski team when an accident at the age of 16 left her paralyzed from the chest down. She earned a Bachelor of Science degree in human biology from Stanford University in 1995.

== Career ==
Davis has traveled widely and competed in a number of disciplines. She won the bronze medal in slalom at the 1998 Winter Paralympics in Nagano, Japan. In 2000, she was the World Champion at Giant Slalom in Anzere, Switzerland. Davis won three silver medals competing in the 2002 Winter Paralympics in Salt Lake City, Utah (downhill, super G, giant slalom). Davis retired from skiing in 2002. On June 1, 2002, she was in a team of four disabled climbers who reached the summit of the 14,179 feet (4,322 m) Mount Shasta in California. Davis was the first female paraplegic to climb a peak over 14,000 feet. The journey was possible by using a Snowpod which is a hand cranked tracked snowmobile devised by Pete Rieke. Davis was awarded Endurance Sports Disabled Athlete of the Year in 2002 and IOC Presidents Disable Athlete Award in 2004.

Davis took up the sport of handcycling in 2010, and was named to the U.S. Paracycling National Team. On September 7, 2012, she won three gold medals at 2012 Summer Paralympics for individual H1-3 road race, H1-4 team relay, and H1-2 individual time trial. In August 2013, Davis won 1st place for road race and time trial at the UCI Para-cycling Road World Championships in Baie-Comeau.

== Elections ==
=== 2020 ===
Davis was unopposed for the Democratic primary and the general election.

=== 2018 ===
Davis was unopposed for the Democratic primary. Davis defeated incumbent Republican Steve Miller with 56.3% of the vote.
