= Canada at the 2002 Winter Paralympics =

- Flag of Canada
- IPC code: CAN
- NPC: Canadian Paralympic Committee
- Website: www.paralympic.ca

in Salt Lake City
- Competitors: 27 in 3 sports
- Flag bearers: Mark Ludbrook (opening); Brian McKeever (closing)
- Medals Ranked 6th: Gold 6 Silver 4 Bronze 5 Total 15

Winter Paralympics appearances (overview)
- 1976; 1980; 1984; 1988; 1992; 1994; 1998; 2002; 2006; 2010; 2014; 2018; 2022; 2026

Canada competed in the 2002 Winter Paralympics in Salt Lake City, United States, from March 7 to 16, 2002. A total of 27 athletes (23 male and 4 female), were sent by the Canadian Paralympic Committee to compete in three sports. Canada won 15 medals and finished sixth on the medal table, the best finish at the Winter Paralympics at that time.

== Medallists ==
| Medal | Name | Sport | Event |
|---|---|---|---|
| Gold | Chris Williamson; Guide: Bill Harriott | Alpine skiing | Men's slalom B3 |
| Gold | Daniel Wesley | Alpine skiing | Men's slalom LW12 |
| Gold | Lauren Woolstencroft | Alpine skiing | Women's Super-G LW3,4,6/8,9 |
| Gold | Lauren Woolstencroft | Alpine skiing | Women's slalom LW3,4,6/8,9 |
| Gold | Brian McKeever; Guide: Robin McKeever | Cross-country skiing | Men's 5 km classical B3 |
| Gold | Brian McKeever; Guide: Robin McKeever | Cross-country skiing | Men's 10 km free B3 |
| Silver | Daniel Wesley | Alpine skiing | Men's Super-G LW12 |
| Silver | Karolina Wisniewska | Alpine skiing | Women's giant slalom LW3,4,6/8,9 |
| Silver | Karolina Wisniewska | Alpine skiing | Women's slalom LW3,4,6/8,9 |
| Silver | Brian McKeever; Guide: Robin McKeever | Cross-country skiing | Men's 20 km free, visually impaired |
| Bronze | Scott Patterson | Alpine skiing | Men's giant slalom LW12 |
| Bronze | Daniel Wesley | Alpine skiing | Men's downhill LW12 |
| Bronze | Karolina Wisniewska | Alpine skiing | Women's downhill LW3,4,6/8,9 |
| Bronze | Karolina Wisniewska | Alpine skiing | Women's Super-G LW3,4,6/8,9 |
| Bronze | Lauren Woolstencroft | Alpine skiing | Women's giant slalom LW3,4,6/8,9 |

== See also ==
- Canada at the 2002 Winter Olympics
- Canada at the Paralympics
