= Switzerland at the 2002 Winter Paralympics =

- IPC code: SUI
- NPC: Swiss Paralympic Committee
- Website: www.swissparalympic.ch

in Salt Lake City
- Competitors: 18
- Medals Ranked 7th: Gold 6 Silver 4 Bronze 2 Total 12

Winter Paralympics appearances (overview)
- 1976; 1980; 1984; 1988; 1992; 1994; 1998; 2002; 2006; 2010; 2014; 2018; 2022; 2026

Switzerland competed at the 2002 Winter Paralympics in Salt Lake City, United States. 18 competitors from Switzerland won 12 medals including 6 gold, 4 silver and 2 bronze and finished 7th in the medal table.

== See also ==
- Switzerland at the Paralympics
- Switzerland at the 2002 Winter Olympics
