= Slovakia at the 2002 Winter Paralympics =

- IPC code: SVK
- NPC: Slovak Paralympic Committee
- Website: www.spv.sk

in Salt Lake City
- Competitors: 14
- Medals Ranked 20th: Gold 0 Silver 3 Bronze 6 Total 9

Winter Paralympics appearances (overview)
- 1994; 1998; 2002; 2006; 2010; 2014; 2018; 2022; 2026

Other related appearances
- Czechoslovakia (1976–1992)

Slovakia competed at the 2002 Winter Paralympics in Salt Lake City, United States. 14 competitors from Slovakia won 9 medals, 3 silver and 6 bronze and finished 20th in the medal table.

== Medalists ==
Medal	Name	Sport	Event
Silver	Radomir Dudas; Guide: Juraj Mikulas	Alpine skiing	Men's slalom B1-2
Silver	Marian Balaz; Guide: Michal Jurco	Biathlon	Men's 7.5 km free technique blind
Silver	Vladimir Gajdiciar	Cross-country skiing	Men's 5 km sitski LW12
Bronze	Radomir Dudas; Guide: Juraj Mikulas	Alpine skiing	Men's giant slalom B1-2
Bronze	Stefan Kopcik; Guide: Branislav Mazgut	Alpine skiing	Men's slalom B1-2
Bronze	Norbert Holík; Guide: Radoslav Grus	Alpine skiing	Men's slalom B3
Bronze	Iveta Chlebakova	Alpine skiing	Women's giant slalom LW6/8
Bronze	Iveta Chlebakova	Alpine skiing	Women's slalom LW6/8
Bronze	Jozef Mesik	Biathlon	Men's 7.5 km free technique standing

== See also ==
- Slovakia at the Paralympics
- Slovakia at the 2002 Winter Olympics
