= Snowbasin =

Ski resort in Utah, United States

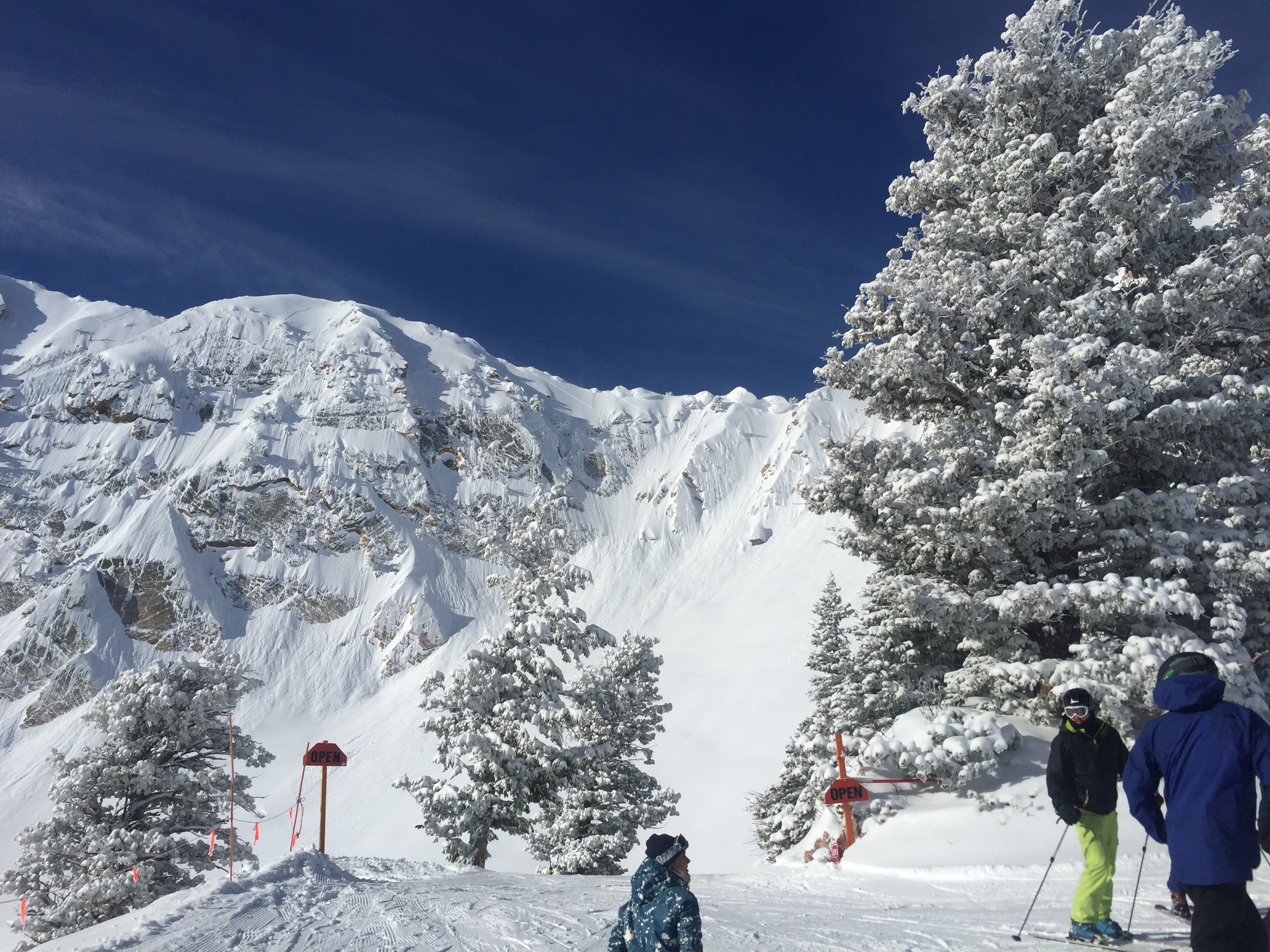
- Sunny day at Snowbasin in February 2019

- Location in the United States Location in Utah
- Location: Mount Ogden; Weber County, Utah, U.S.
- Nearest city: Huntsville
- Coordinates: 41.216°N 111.857°W
- Vertical: 2,959 ft (902 m)
- Top elevation: 9,350 ft (2,850 m)
- Base elevation: 6,391 ft (1,948 m)
- Skiable area: 3,000 acres (12.1 km^{2})
- Trails: 104; 20% easiest 50% more difficult 30% most difficult
- Longest run: Elk Ridge 2.9 mi (4.7 km)
- Lift system: 13; Chairs: 10: 1 tram; 2 gondolas; 6 high speed quads/six packs; 1 triple chairlift Surface: 2; 2 Magic carpet; 1 Wildcat Handle Tow
- Lift capacity: 14,650 skiers/hr
- Terrain parks: 3
- Snowfall: 350 inches (29.2 ft; 8.9 m)
- Snowmaking: 600 acres (2.4 km^{2})
- Night skiing: No
- Website: snowbasin.com

Snowbasin Resort is a ski resort in the western United States, located in Weber County, Utah, 33 miles (53 km) northeast of Salt Lake City, on the back (east) side of the Wasatch Range.

Opened 87 years ago in 1939, as part of an effort by the city of Ogden to restore the Wheeler Creek watershed, it is one of the oldest continually operating ski resorts in the United States. One of the owners in the early days was Aaron Ross. Over the next fifty years Snowbasin grew, and after a large investment in lifts and snowmaking by owner Earl Holding, Snowbasin hosted the 2002 Winter Olympic alpine skiing races for downhill, combined, and super-G, and is expected to reprise these roles for the 2034 Winter Olympics. The movie Frozen was filmed there in 2009.

Snowbasin was ranked as the No. 1 ski resort in the U.S. by SKI Magazine, Outside and USA Today in 2025. Snowbasin is located on Mount Ogden at the west end of State Route 226, which is connected to I-84 and SR-39 via SR-167 (New Trappers Loop Road).

== History ==
Snowbasin is one of the oldest continuously operating ski areas in the United States. Following the end of World War I and the Great Depression, numerous small ski resorts were developed in Utah's snow-packed mountains, and Weber County wanted one of their own. They decided to redevelop the area in and around Wheeler Basin, a deteriorated watershed area that had been overgrazed and subjected to aggressive timber-harvesting.

Lands were restored and turned over to the U.S. Forest Service, and by 1938 the USFS and Alf Engen had committed to turning the area into a recreational site. The first ski tow was built in 1939 and in service at the new Snow Basin ski park. In 1940, the Civilian Conservation Corps (CCC) crew built the first access road to the new resort, allowing easy access for the general public.

In the 1950s, Sam Huntington of Berthoud Pass, Colorado, purchased Snow Basin from the City of Ogden and proceeded to expand the uphill capacity beyond the Wildcat single-seat wooden tower lift and the old rope tow. Overall, he installed a twin chair in place of the rope tow, and a platter-pull tow, later replaced by a twin chair, was installed at Porcupine, to the left of the steep rocky face of Mount Ogden.

The fourth NCAA Skiing Championships, the first in Utah, were held at Snow Basin in 1957. The downhill race course was set on the right side of the steep face of Mt. Ogden, on the slope named "John Paul Jones", after an early Snow Basin skier. The John Paul Jones' run was only accessible with a 45-minute hike from the top of the Porcupine lift.

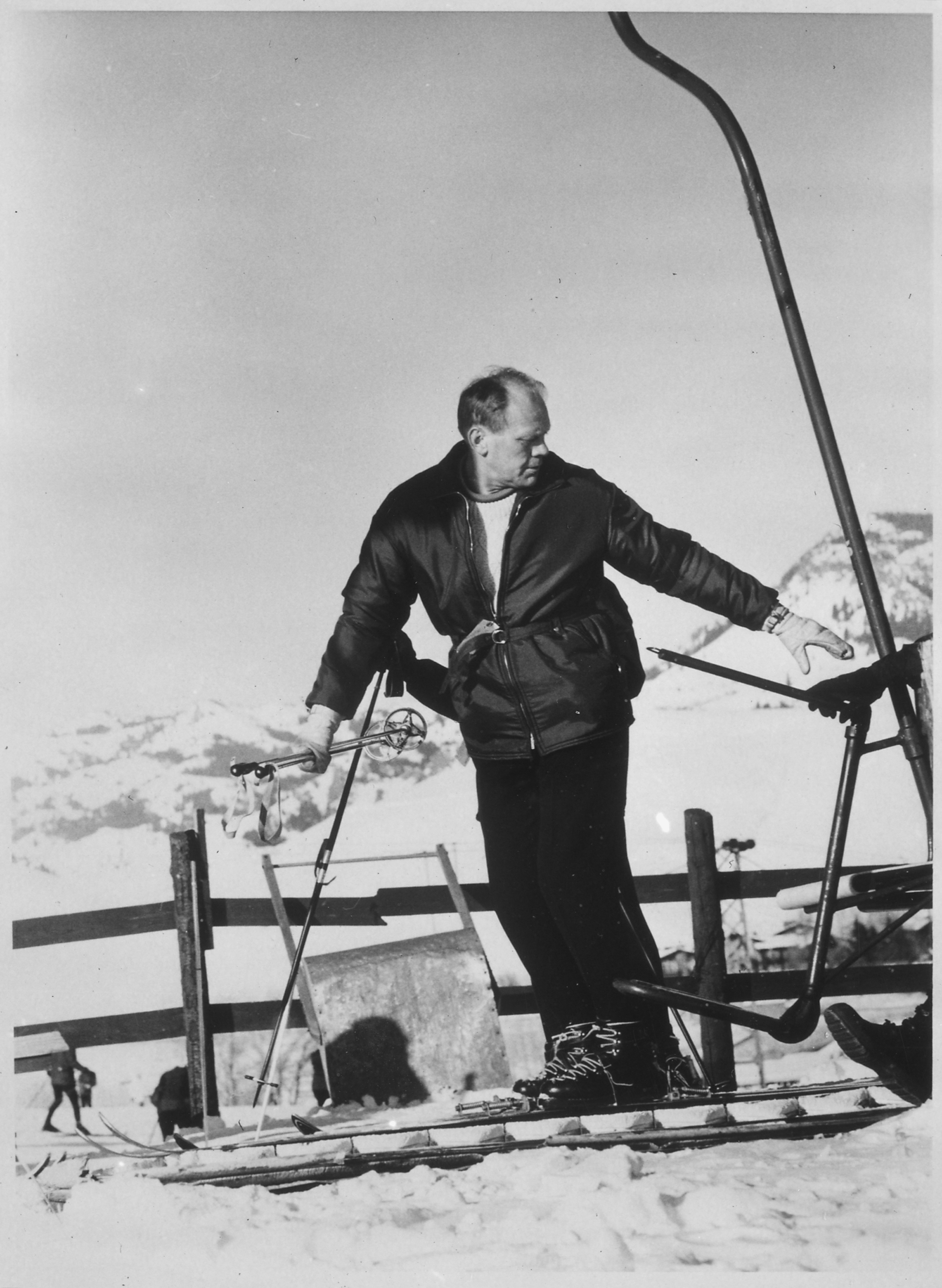
Rep. Gerald Ford at Snow Basin in 1967

Anderl Molterer, of the Austrian national ski team competing there that weekend, approached Huntington and told him if a lift was built directly to the top of the John Paul Jones run, he would bring his world famous Austrian team to Snow Basin to train on it. Molterer said John Paul was the best downhill run in the world. Huntington ignored this proposal, and a lift to the top of John Paul would not be built until Snowbasin received the rights to hold the alpine speed events for the 2002 Winter Olympics.

Huntington was killed five years later in 1962, as he was performing post-season maintenance, replacing an electrical fuse at the Porcupine lift. Several Ogden businessmen purchased Snow Basin from the Huntington family.

Another major personality to come out of Snow Basin was M. Earl Miller, who ran the ski school from the mid-1950s until 1987. Miller played a key role in drafting the Professional Ski Instructors of America (PSIA) American Ski Technique in 1961.

Pete Seibert, founder of Vail, led a partnership which bought Snow Basin in 1978, but ran into financial difficulty in 1984. The area was sold that October to Earl Holding, owner of Sun Valley in Idaho, and it became "Snowbasin".

=== 2002 Winter Olympics & Paralympics ===
Because it was to serve as an Olympic venue site, the U.S. Congress passed the Snowbasin Land Exchange Act in 1996 as part of the Omnibus Lands Bill. The act transferred 1,377 acres (5.57 km^{2}) of National Forest System lands near the resort to the private ownership of Snowbasin, and identified a set of projects that were necessary for the resort to host the Olympic events. Six years earlier in 1990, a similar swap had been denied by the U.S. Forest Service. These projects allowed Snowbasin to double in size in 1998 with new terrain expansions onto Allen Peak to the north and Strawberry and DeMoisy Peaks to the south.

During the 2002 Olympics, Snowbasin hosted the downhill, combined (downhill and slalom), and super-G events. The spectator viewing areas consisted of a stadium at the foot of the run, with two sections of snow terraces for standing along both sides of the run. The spectator capacity was 22,500 per event; 99.1 percent of tickets were sold, and 124,373 spectators were able to view events at the Snowbasin Olympic venue. During the 2002 Winter Paralympics, Snowbasin hosted the Alpine Skiing events, including downhill, super-G, slalom, and giant slalom.

== Statistics ==
=== Mountain information ===
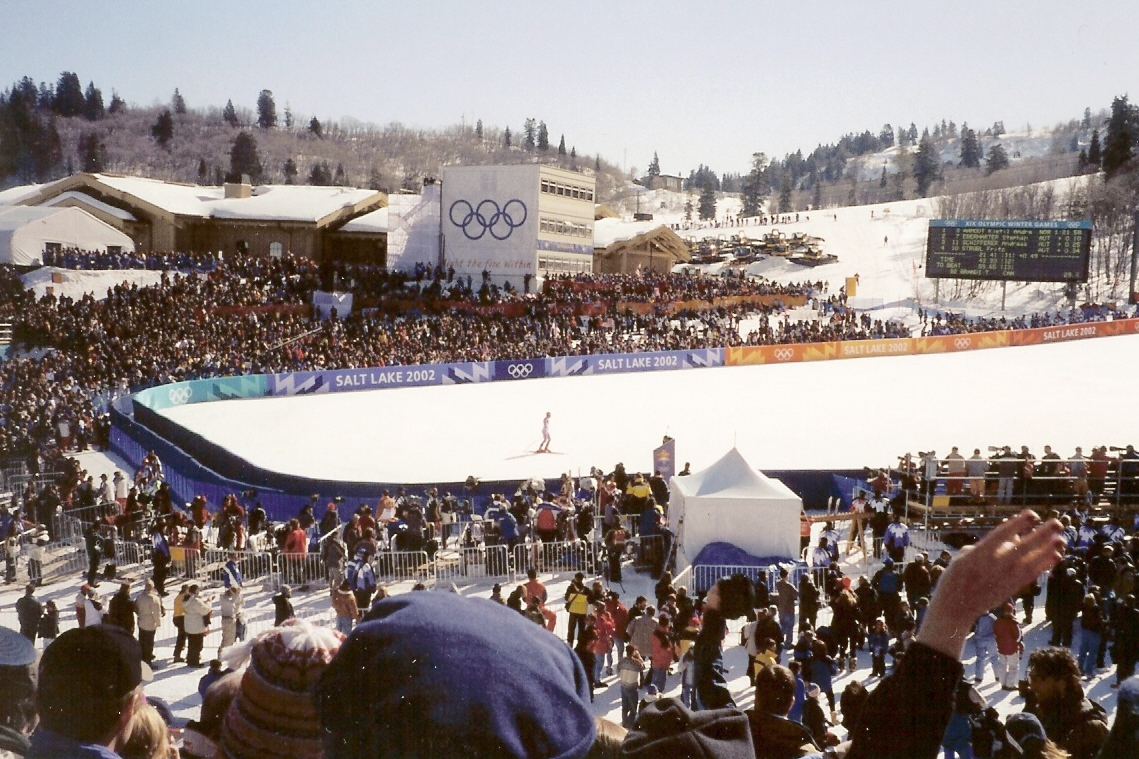
Men's super-G at the 2002 Winter Olympics

- Top elevation: 9,350 feet (2,850 m)
- Base elevation: 6,391 feet (1,948 m)
- Vertical rise: 2,959 feet (902 m)
- Average yearly snowfall: 350 inches (890 cm)
- Skiable area: 3,000 acres (12.1 km^{2})
- Snowmaking area: 600 acres (240 ha)

=== Trails ===
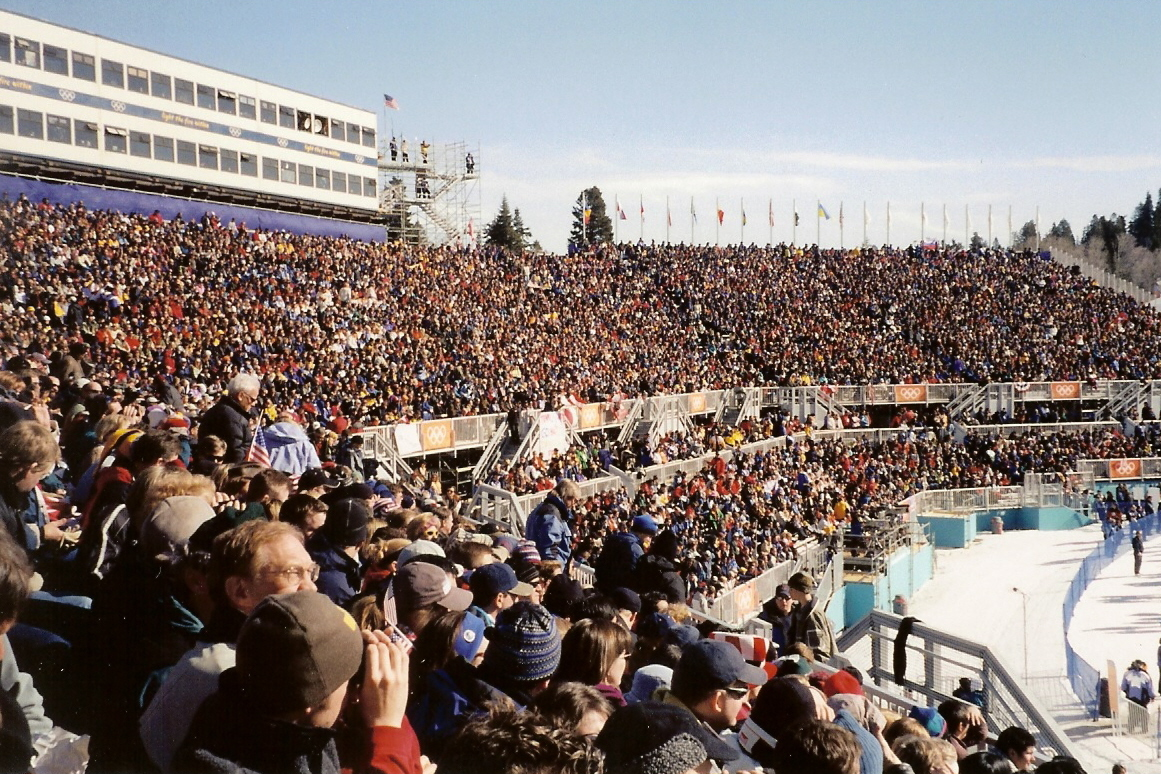
2002 Winter Olympics

- Total runs: 104
  - Run ratings: 7 easier, 30 more difficult, 35 most difficult, 32 expert only
- Total Nordic trails: 5, approximately 16 miles (26 km)
  - Nordic trail ratings: 3 easier, 1 more difficult, 1 most difficult
- Terrain parks: 3
  - Terrain park ratings: The Crazy Kat (easier), Coyote (Intermediate), and Apex (Advanced) parks.
- Superpipe: none

=== Lifts ===
- Total lifts: 13
  - Chairlifts: 9
    - 1 15-Person Tram
      - Allen Peak Tram (Doppelmayr, 1998)
    - 2 Gondolas
      - Strawberry Express (Doppelmayr, 1998)
      - Needles Express (Doppelmayr, 1998)
    - 3 high speed six packs
      - Wildcat Express (Doppelmayr, 2017)
      - Middle Bowl Express (Leitner-Poma, 2021)
      - DeMoisy Express (Leitner-Poma, 2023)
    - 3 high speed quads
      - John Paul Express (Doppelmayr, 1998)
      - Little Cat Express (Doppelmayr-CTEC, 2008)
      - Becker Express (Leitner-Poma, 2025)
    - 1 triple chairlift
      - Porcupine (Albertsson-Stadeli, 1985)
  - Surface lifts: 3
    - 2 Magic carpet
    - 1 Hand rope surface tow (tubing hill)

=== Winter season ===
- Ski season dates: late-November to mid-April (conditions permitting)
- Operating hours: Gondola: 9:00 a.m. to 4:00 p.m. daily (some lifts close at 3:30 p.m. daily)
  Grizzly Center retail and rentals: 8:00 a.m. to 5:00 p.m.

=== Summer season ===
- Summer season dates: Father's Day Weekend in June to First Weekend in October (conditions permitting)
- Operating hours: 9:00 a.m. to 5:00 p.m. Saturday, Sunday and holidays
- Total trails: 17, approximately 25 miles (40 km)
- Trail ratings: 4.5 easy, 6.5 moderate, 3 difficult, 3 hike only
