= Germany at the 2002 Winter Paralympics =

- IPC code: GER
- NPC: National Paralympic Committee Germany
- Website: www.dbs-npc.de (in German)

in Salt Lake City
- Competitors: 26
- Medals Ranked 1st: Gold 17 Silver 1 Bronze 15 Total 33

Winter Paralympics appearances (overview)
- 1976; 1980; 1984; 1988; 1992; 1994; 1998; 2002; 2006; 2010; 2014; 2018; 2022; 2026

Germany competed at the 2002 Winter Paralympics in Salt Lake City, United States. 26 competitors from Germany won 33 medals, including 17 gold, 1 silver and 15 bronze and finished 1st in the medal table.

== See also ==
- Germany at the Paralympics
- Germany at the 2002 Winter Olympics
