= Austria at the 2002 Winter Paralympics =

- IPC code: AUT
- NPC: Austrian Paralympic Committee
- Website: www.oepc.at (in German)

in Salt Lake City
- Competitors: 22
- Medals Ranked 4th: Gold 9 Silver 10 Bronze 10 Total 29

Winter Paralympics appearances (overview)
- 1976; 1980; 1984; 1988; 1992; 1994; 1998; 2002; 2006; 2010; 2014; 2018; 2022; 2026

Austria competed at the 2002 Winter Paralympics in Salt Lake City, United States. 22 competitors from Austria won 29 medals including 9 gold, 10 silver and 10 bronze and finished 4th in the medal table.

== See also ==
- Austria at the Paralympics
- Austria at the 2002 Winter Olympics
