= List of Paralympic medalists in alpine skiing =

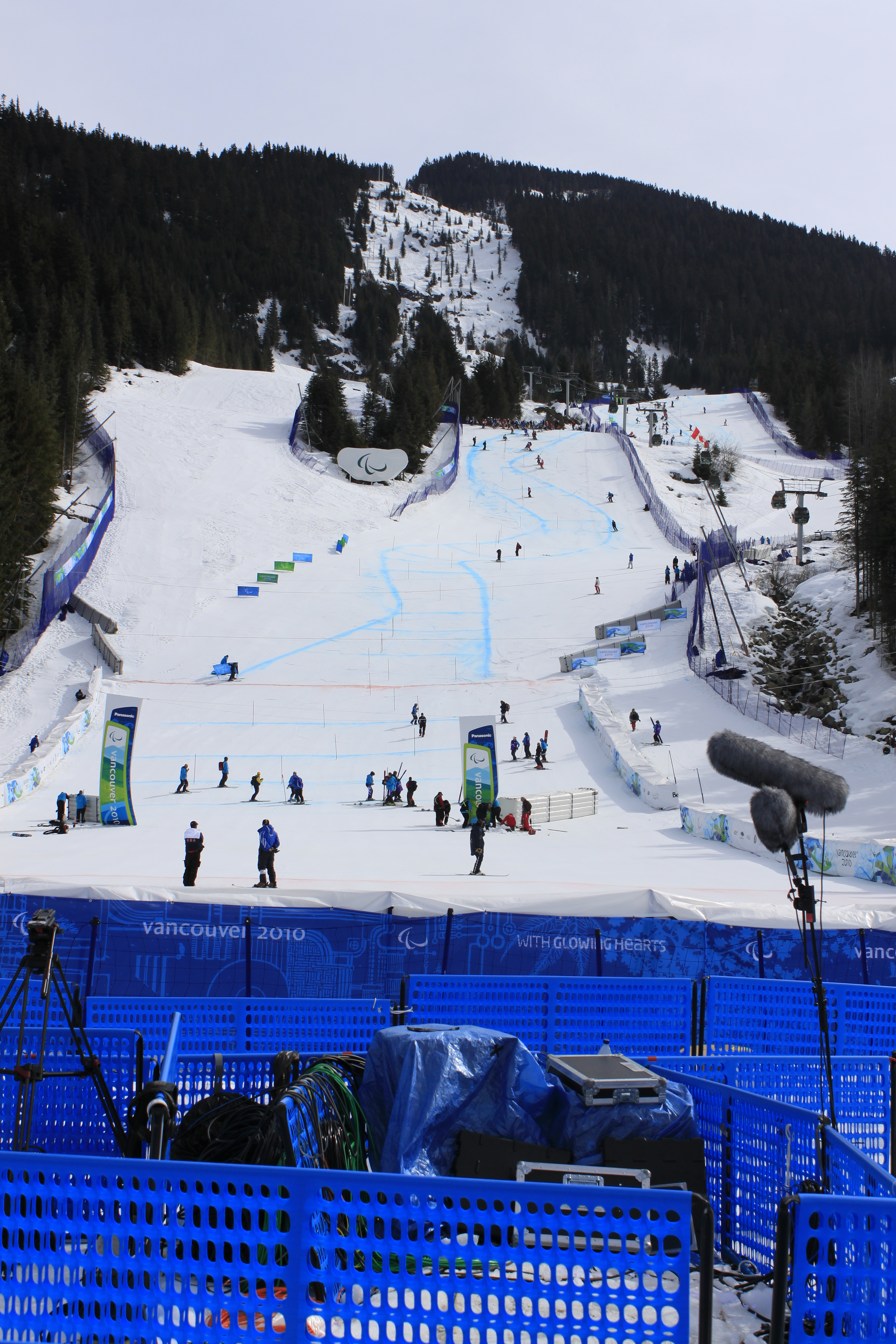
Whistler, Vancouver, during the 2010 Winter Paralympics.

Alpine skiing is a Paralympic sport that is contested at the Winter Paralympic Games. The first Winter Paralympics, held in 1976 in Örnsköldsvik, included slalom, giant slalom and alpine combination.

Since the 2006 Winter Games in Torino, a three category system is used. The three categories are: sitting, standing and visually impaired.

At the 2010 Winter Paralympics, events for both men and women were held in five disciplines: downhill (since 1984), slalom, giant slalom, super giant slalom (super-G) (since 1992), and combined.

A total of 514 gold medals, 506 silver medals and 494 bronze medals have been awarded since 1976 and have been won by skiers from 26 National Paralympic Committees (NPC).

== Men ==
=== Downhill ===
Games	Class	Gold	Silver	Bronze
1984 Innsbruck	B1	Karl Preining; Austria	Christopher Orr; New Zealand	Mike May; United States
1984 Innsbruck	B2	Mark Bentz; Canada	Uli Rompel; Canada	August Hofer; Austria
1984 Innsbruck	LW1	Helmut Falch; Austria	Andy Fasth; United States	Wayne Burton; Canada
1984 Innsbruck	LW2	Rainer Bergmann; Austria	Christian Haeusle; Austria	Ola Rylander; Sweden
1984 Innsbruck	LW3	Paul Dibello; United States	Bernard Baudean; France	Mark Edwards; New Zealand
1984 Innsbruck	LW4	Markus Ramsauer; Austria	Josef Meusburger; Austria	Paul Fournier; Switzerland
1984 Innsbruck	LW5/7	Niko Moll; West Germany	Lars Lundstroem; Sweden	Felix Abele; West Germany
1984 Innsbruck	LW6/8	Rolf Heinzmann; Switzerland	Heinz Moser; Switzerland	Dietmar Schweninger; Austria
1984 Innsbruck	LW9	Tristan Mouric; France	Hansueli Feuz; Switzerland	Peter Bartlome; Switzerland
1988 Innsbruck	B1	Franz Griessbacher; Austria	Mats Linder; Sweden	Willi Hohm; Austria
1988 Innsbruck	B2	Odo Habermann; Austria	Stephane Saas; France	Antonio Marziali; Italy
1988 Innsbruck	B3	Bruno Oberhammer; Italy	Uli Rompel; Canada	Josef Erlacher; Italy
1988 Innsbruck	LW1	Dan Ashbaugh; United States	Mark Godfrey; United States	Stephen Ellefson; Canada
1988 Innsbruck	LW2	Fritz Berger; Switzerland	Greg Mannino; United States	Michael Hipp; West Germany
1988 Innsbruck	LW3	Bernard Baudean; France	Gerhard Langer; Austria	Franciszek Tracz; Poland
1988 Innsbruck	LW4	Paul Fournier; Switzerland	Hans Burn; Switzerland	Rik Heid; United States
1988 Innsbruck	LW5/7	Cato Zahl Pedersen; Norway	Kip Roth; United States	Lars Lundstroem; Sweden
1988 Innsbruck	LW6/8	Markus Pfefferle; West Germany	Paul Neukomm; Switzerland	Meinhard Tatschl; Austria
1988 Innsbruck	LW9	Eberhard Seischab; West Germany	Tristan Mouric; France	Robert Stroshine; United States
1992 Tignes-Albertville	LW1,3,5/7,9	Gerd Schönfelder; Germany	Jean-Luc Jiguet; France	Jeff Dickson; Canada
1992 Tignes-Albertville	LW2	Greg Mannino; United States	Juerg Gadient; Switzerland	Alexander Spitz; Germany
1992 Tignes-Albertville	LW4	Hans Burn; Switzerland	Paul Fournier; Switzerland	Rik Heid; United States
1992 Tignes-Albertville	LW6/8	Meinhard Tatschl; Austria	Markus Pfefferle; Germany	Lionel Brun; France
1992 Tignes-Albertville	LW10	Chad Colley; United States	Michael McDougal; United States	Matthew Stockford; Great Britain
1992 Tignes-Albertville	LW11	Jim Martinson; United States	David Kiley; United States	Ludovic Rey-Robert; France
1994 Lillehammer	B1-2	Juan Carlos Molina; Spain	Stephane Saas; France	Manuel Buendía; Spain
1994 Lillehammer	B3	Brian Santos; United States	Bruno Oberhammer; Italy	Josef Erlacher; Italy
1994 Lillehammer	LW1/3	Bernard Baudean; France	Jozef Mistina; Slovakia	Peter Poetscher; Austria
1994 Lillehammer	LW2	Greg Mannino; United States	Alexander Spitz; Germany	Michael Milton; Australia
1994 Lillehammer	LW4	Rik Heid; United States	Hans Burn; Switzerland	James Lagerstrom; United States
1994 Lillehammer	LW5/7	Gerd Schönfelder; Germany	Cato Zahl Pedersen; Norway	Jean-Luc Jiguet; France
1994 Lillehammer	LW6/8	Hannes Huettenbrenner; Austria	Meinhard Tatschl; Austria	Lionel Brun; France
1994 Lillehammer	LW9	Tristan Mouric; France	James Paterson; Australia	Arno Hirschbuehl; Austria
1994 Lillehammer	LWX	Chris Waddell; United States	Helmut Wolf; Italy	Takashi Kurosu; Japan
1994 Lillehammer	LWXI	Wendl Eberle; Switzerland	William Bowness; United States	James Barker; Great Britain
1994 Lillehammer	LWXII	Ludovic Rey-Robert; France	Daniel Cederstam; Sweden	Karl Lotz; Germany
1998 Nagano	B1,3	Juan Carlos Molina; Spain	Gianmaria Dal Maistro; Italy	Bruno Oberhammer; Italy
1998 Nagano	B2	Gerhard Pscheider; Austria	Kurt Primus; Austria	Stefan Kopcik; Slovakia
1998 Nagano	LW1,3,5/7,9	James Paterson; Australia	Matthew Butson; New Zealand	Jozef Mistina; Slovakia
1998 Nagano	LW2	Greg Mannino; United States	Andreas Schmid; Austria	Fritz Berger; Switzerland
1998 Nagano	LW4	Hans Burn; Switzerland	Hubert Mandl; Austria	Robert Meusburger; Austria
1998 Nagano	LW6/8	Rolf Heinzmann; Switzerland	Markus Pfefferle; Germany	Frank Pfortmueller; Germany
1998 Nagano	LW10	Chris Waddell; United States	Gustav Gross; Germany	Ronny Persson; Sweden
1998 Nagano	LW11	John Davis; United States	Raynald Riu; France	Daniel Wesley; Canada
2002 Salt Lake City	B1-3	Bart Bunting; Guide: Nathan Chivers; Australia	Eric Villalon; Guide: Pere Comet; Spain	Jon Santacana Maiztegui; Guide: Raul Capdevila; Spain
2002 Salt Lake City	LW2	Michael Milton; Australia	Christian Lanthaler; Italy	Jason Lalla; United States
2002 Salt Lake City	LW3,5/7,9	Gerd Schönfelder; Germany	Arno Hirschbuehl; Austria	Jacob Rife; United States
2002 Salt Lake City	LW4	Hans Burn; Switzerland	James Lagerstrom; United States	Steven Bayley; New Zealand
2002 Salt Lake City	LW6/8	Rolf Heinzmann; Switzerland	Lionel Brun; France	Markus Pfefferle; Germany
2002 Salt Lake City	LW10	Martin Braxenthaler; Germany	Chris Waddell; United States	Ronny Persson; Sweden
2002 Salt Lake City	LW11	Harald Eder; Austria	Andreas Schiestl; Austria	Fabrizio Zardini; Italy
2002 Salt Lake City	LW12	Kevin Bramble; United States	Chris Devlin-Young; United States	Daniel Wesley; Canada
2006 Turin	visually impaired	Gerd Gradwohl; Guide: Karl-Heinz Vachenauer; Germany	Chris Williamson; Guide: Robert Taylor; Canada	Nicolas Berejny; Guide: Sophie Troc; France
2006 Turin	sitting	Kevin Bramble; United States	Chris Devlin-Young; United States	Denis Barbet; France
2006 Turin	standing	Gerd Schönfelder; Germany	Michael Milton; Australia	Walter Lackner; Austria
2010 Vancouver	visually impaired	Jon Santacana Maiztegui; Guide: Miguel Galindo Garcés; Spain	Mark Bathum; Guide: Slater Storey; United States	Gerd Gradwohl; Guide: Karl-Heinz Vachenauer; Germany
2010 Vancouver	sitting	Christoph Kunz; Switzerland	Taiki Morii; Japan	Akira Kano; Japan
2010 Vancouver	standing	Gerd Schönfelder; Germany	Marty Mayberry; Australia; Michael Brugger; Switzerland	
2014 Sochi	visually impaired	Jon Santacana Maiztegui; Guide: Miguel Galindo Garcés; Spain	Miroslav Haraus; Guide: Maros Hudik; Slovakia	Mac Marcoux; Guide: Robin Femy; Canada
2014 Sochi	sitting	Akira Kano; Japan	Josh Dueck; Canada	Takeshi Suzuki; Japan
2014 Sochi	standing	Markus Salcher; Austria	Alexey Bugaev; Russia	Vincent Gauthier-Manuel; France
2018 Pyeongchang	visually impaired	Mac Marcoux; Guide: Jack Leitch; Canada	Jakub Krako; Guide: Branislav Brozman; Slovakia	Giacomo Bertagnolli; Guide: Fabrizio Cazal; Italy
2018 Pyeongchang	sitting	Andrew Kurka; United States	Taiki Morii; Japan	Corey Peters; New Zealand
2018 Pyeongchang	standing	Théo Gmür; Switzerland	Arthur Bauchet; France	Markus Salcher; Austria
2022 Beijing	visually impaired	Johannes Aigner; Guide: Matteo Fleischmann; Austria	Mac Marcoux; Guide: Jack Leitch; Canada	Hyacinthe Deleplace; Guide: Valentin Giroud Moine; France
2022 Beijing	sitting	Corey Peters; New Zealand	Jesper Pedersen; Norway	Taiki Morii; Japan
2022 Beijing	standing	Arthur Bauchet; France	Markus Salcher; Austria	Théo Gmür; Switzerland
2026 Milano Cortina	visually impaired	Johannes Aigner; Guide: Matteo Fleischmann; Austria	Kalle Ericsson; Guide: Sierra Smith; Canada	Giacomo Bertagnolli; Guide: Andrea Ravelli; Italy
2026 Milano Cortina	sitting	Jesper Pedersen; Norway	Niels de Langen; Netherlands	Kurt Oatway; Canada
2026 Milano Cortina	standing	Robin Cuche; Switzerland	Arthur Bauchet; France	Alexey Bugaev; Russia

=== Slalom ===
Games	Class	Gold	Silver	Bronze
1976 Örnsköldsvik	I	Franz Meister; Austria	Peter Perner; Austria	Hans Strasser; West Germany
1976 Örnsköldsvik	II	Josef Meusburger; Austria	Peter Portisch; West Germany	Herbert Millendorfer; Austria
1976 Örnsköldsvik	III	Heinz Moser; Switzerland	Manfred Brandl; Austria	Franz Perner; Austria
1976 Örnsköldsvik	IV A	John Gow; Canada	Richard Prager; West Germany	Bernard Baudean; France
1976 Örnsköldsvik	IV B	Felix Gisler; Switzerland	Horst Morokutti; Austria	Willi Berger; Austria
1980 Geilo	1A	Peter Perner; Austria	Jim Cullen; Canada	Hans Strasser; West Germany
1980 Geilo	2A	Josef Meusburger; Austria	Markus Ramsauer; Austria	Remy Arnod; France
1980 Geilo	2B	Gerhard Langer; Austria	Anton Berger; Austria	Anton Ledermaier; Austria
1980 Geilo	3A	Rolf Heinzmann; Switzerland	Hubert Griessmaier; Austria	Dietmar Schweninger; Austria
1980 Geilo	3B	Cato Zahl Pedersen; Norway	Niko Moll; West Germany	Mathias Berger; West Germany
1980 Geilo	4	Doug Keil; United States	None	None
1984 Innsbruck	LW1	Helmut Falch; Austria	Wayne Burton; Canada	Rod Hernley; United States
1984 Innsbruck	LW2	Ola Rylander; Sweden	Rainer Bergmann; Austria	David Jamison; United States
1984 Innsbruck	LW3	Paul Dibello; United States	Gerhard Langer; Austria	Franciszek Tracz; Poland
1984 Innsbruck	LW4	Josef Meusburger; Austria	Paul Fournier; Switzerland	Markus Ramsauer; Austria
1984 Innsbruck	LW5/7	Lars Lundstroem; Sweden	Niko Moll; West Germany	Murray Bedel; Canada
1984 Innsbruck	LW6/8	Rolf Heinzmann; Switzerland	Michael Knaus; Austria	Reed Robinson; United States
1984 Innsbruck	LW9	Tristan Mouric; France	Brad Hudiberg; United States	Walter Kälin; Switzerland
1988 Innsbruck	LW1	Dan Ashbaugh; United States	Mark Godfrey; United States	None
1988 Innsbruck	LW2	Alexander Spitz; West Germany	David Jamison; United States	Michel Duranceau; Canada
1988 Innsbruck	LW4	Paul Fournier; Switzerland	Patrick Cooper; New Zealand	Rik Heid; United States
1988 Innsbruck	LW5/7	Lars Lundstroem; Sweden	Kip Roth; United States	Matthias Berg; West Germany
1988 Innsbruck	LW6/8	Dietmar Schweninger; Austria	Markus Pfefferle; West Germany	Meinhard Tatschl; Austria
1988 Innsbruck	LW9	Tristan Mouric; France	Eberhard Seischab; West Germany	Don Garcia; United States
1988 Innsbruck	LW10	Paul Bluschke; Austria	Jacques Blanc; Switzerland	Peter Wiedemann; West Germany
1992 Tignes-Albertville	LW1,3,5/7,9	Jeff Dickson; Canada	Jean-Luc Jiguet; France	Tristan Mouric; France
1992 Tignes-Albertville	LW2	Michael Milton; Australia	Greg Mannino; United States	Rainer Bergmann; Austria
1992 Tignes-Albertville	LW4	Patrick Cooper; New Zealand	Rik Heid; United States	Ewald Vogl; Germany
1992 Tignes-Albertville	LW6/8	Lionel Brun; France	Markus Pfefferle; Germany	Reed Robinson; United States
1992 Tignes-Albertville	LW10	Reinhold Sager; Austria	Chris Waddell; United States	Michael McDougal; United States
1992 Tignes-Albertville	LW11	Jacques Blanc; Switzerland	David Kiley; United States	Michael Norton; Australia
1994 Lillehammer	B1-2	Stephane Saas; France	Manuel Buendia; Spain	Josef Gmeiner; Liechtenstein
1994 Lillehammer	B3	Brian Santos; United States	Bruno Oberhammer; Italy	Manfred Perfler; Italy
1994 Lillehammer	LW1/3	Chris Young; United States	Jozef Mistina; Slovakia	Kevin O'Sullivan; New Zealand
1994 Lillehammer	LW2	Alexander Spitz; Germany	Michael Milton; Australia	Monte Meier; United States
1994 Lillehammer	LW4	Patrick Cooper; New Zealand	Ewald Vogl; Germany	
1994 Lillehammer	LW4	Patrick Cooper; New Zealand	Rik Heid; United States	
1994 Lillehammer	LW5/7	Gerd Schönfelder; Germany	Josef Orlitsch; Austria	Niko Moll; Germany
1994 Lillehammer	LW6/8	Meinhard Tatschl; Austria	Jeremy Babcock; United States	Stanislav Loska; Czech Republic
1994 Lillehammer	LW9	Arno Hirschbuehl; Austria	Tristan Mouric; France	Eberhard Seischab; Germany
1994 Lillehammer	LWX	Chris Waddell; United States	Reinhold Sager; Austria	Takashi Kurosu; Japan
1994 Lillehammer	LWXI	Michael Norton; Australia	Ryuei Shinohe; Japan	William Bowness; United States
1994 Lillehammer	LWXII	Ludovic Rey-Robert; France	Thomas Weiss; Germany	Toshihiko Takamura; Japan
1998 Nagano	B1,3	Bruno Oberhammer; Italy	Jean-Noel Arbez; France	Gianmaria Dal Maistro; Italy
1998 Nagano	B2	Eric Villalon; Spain	Stefan Kopcik; Slovakia	Kurt Primus; Austria
1998 Nagano	LW1,3,5/7	Gerd Schönfelder; Germany	Jozef Mistina; Slovakia	Jacob Rife; United States
1998 Nagano	LW2	Monte Meier; United States	Fritz Berger; Switzerland	Juerg Gadient; Switzerland
1998 Nagano	LW4	Hans Burn; Switzerland	Hubert Mandl; Austria	James Lagerstrom; United States
1998 Nagano	LW6/8	Rolf Heinzmann; Switzerland	Robert Durcan; Slovakia	Markus Pfefferle; Germany
1998 Nagano	LW9	Matthew Butson; New Zealand	Arno Hirschbuehl; Austria	James Paterson; Australia
1998 Nagano	LW10	Masahiro Shitaka; Japan	Chris Waddell; United States	Reinhold Sager; Austria
1998 Nagano	LW11	Juergen Egle; Austria	Stacy Kohut; Canada	Hans Joerg Arnold; Switzerland
2002 Salt Lake City	B1-2	Eric Villalon; Guide: Pere Comet; Spain	Radomir Dudas; Guide: Juraj Mikulas; Slovakia	Stefan Kopcik; Guide: Branislav Mazgut; Slovakia
2002 Salt Lake City	B3	Chris Williamson; Guide: Bill Harriott; Canada	Andrew Parr; Guide: David Marchi; United States	Norbert Holík; Guide: Radoslav Grus; Slovakia
2002 Salt Lake City	LW2	Michael Milton; Australia	Monte Meier; United States	Michael Hipp; Germany
2002 Salt Lake City	LW3,5/7,9	Gerd Schönfelder; Germany	Arno Hirschbuehl; Austria	Alexei Moshkine; Russia
2002 Salt Lake City	LW4	Hubert Mandl; Austria	Hans Burn; Switzerland	Martin Falch; Austria
2002 Salt Lake City	LW6/8	Wolfgang Moosbrugger; Austria	Rolf Heinzmann; Switzerland	Lionel Brun; France
2002 Salt Lake City	LW10	Martin Braxenthaler; Germany	Ronny Persson; Sweden	Chris Waddell; United States
2002 Salt Lake City	LW11	Denis Barbet; France	Juergen Egle; Austria	Harald Eder; Austria
2002 Salt Lake City	LW12	Daniel Wesley; Canada	Hans Joerg Arnold; Switzerland	Ludwig Wolf; Germany
2006 Turin	visually impaired	Nicolas Berejny; Guide: Sophie Troc; France	Eric Villalon; Guide: Hodei Yurrita; Spain	Gerd Gradwohl; Guide: Karl-Heinz Vachenauer; Germany
2006 Turin	sitting	Martin Braxenthaler; Germany	Harald Eder; Austria	Juergen Egle; Austria
2006 Turin	standing	Robert Meusburger; Austria	Thomas Pfyl; Switzerland	Gerd Schönfelder; Germany
2010 Vancouver	visually impaired	Jakub Krako; Guide: Juraj Medera; Slovakia	Jon Santacana Maiztegui; Guide: Miguel Galindo Garcés; Spain	Gianmaria dal Maistro; Guide: Tommaso Balasso; Italy
2010 Vancouver	sitting	Martin Braxenthaler; Germany	Josh Dueck; Canada	Philipp Bonadimann; Austria
2010 Vancouver	standing	Adam Hall; New Zealand	Gerd Schönfelder; Germany	Cameron Rahles-Rahbula; Australia
2014 Sochi	visually impaired	Valerii Redkozubov; Guide: Evgeny Geroev; Russia	Jon Santacana Maiztegui; Guide: Miguel Galindo Garcés; Spain	Chris Williamson; Guide: Nick Brush; Canada
2014 Sochi	sitting	Takeshi Suzuki; Japan	Philipp Bonadimann; Austria	Roman Rabl; Austria
2014 Sochi	standing	Alexey Bugaev; Russia	Vincent Gauthier-Manuel; France	Alexander Alyabyev; Russia
2018 Pyeongchang	visually impaired	Giacomo Bertagnolli; Guide: Fabrizio Casal; Italy	Jakub Krako; Guide: Branislav Brozman; Slovakia	Valerii Redkozubov; Guide: Evgeny Geroev; Neutral Paralympic Athletes
2018 Pyeongchang	sitting	Dino Sokolović; Croatia	Tyler Walker; United States	Frédéric François; France
2018 Pyeongchang	standing	Adam Hall; New Zealand	Arthur Bauchet; France	James Stanton; United States
2022 Beijing	visually impaired	Giacomo Bertagnolli; Guide: Andrea Ravelli; Italy	Johannes Aigner; Guide: Matteo Fleischmann; Austria	Miroslav Haraus; Guide: Maroš Hudík; Slovakia
2022 Beijing	sitting	Jesper Pedersen; Norway	Niels de Langen; Netherlands	René De Silvestro; Italy
2022 Beijing	standing	Arthur Bauchet; France	Liang Jingyi; China	Adam Hall; New Zealand

=== Giant slalom ===
Games	Class	Gold	Silver	Bronze
1976 Örnsköldsvik	I	Ulli Helmbold; West Germany	Hans Strasser; West Germany	Franz Meister; Austria
1976 Örnsköldsvik	II	Eugen Diethelm; Switzerland	Herbert Millendorfer; Austria	Remy Arnod; France
1976 Örnsköldsvik	III	Heinz Moser; Switzerland	Manfred Brandl; Austria	Franz Perner; Austria
1976 Örnsköldsvik	IV A	Bernard Baudean; France	Anton Berger; Austria	Anton Ledermaier; Austria
1976 Örnsköldsvik	IV B	Adolf Hagn; Austria	Horst Morokutti; Austria	Peter Braun; West Germany
1980 Geilo	1A	Peter Perner; Austria	Greg Oswald; Canada	Franz Meister; Austria
1980 Geilo	2A	Markus Ramsauer; Austria	Josef Meusburger; Austria	Eugen Diethelm; Switzerland
1980 Geilo	2B	Bernard Baudean; France	Gerhard Langer; Austria	Anton Berger; Austria
1980 Geilo	3A	Rolf Heinzmann; Switzerland	Heinz Moser; Switzerland	Theo Feger; West Germany
1980 Geilo	3B	Cato Zahl Pedersen; Norway	Felix Gisler; Switzerland	Niko Moll; West Germany
1980 Geilo	4	Doug Keil; United States	None	None
1984 Innsbruck	B1	Karl Preining; Austria	Rod Hersey; Canada	Mike May; United States
1984 Innsbruck	B2	Odo Habermann; Austria	Glen Abramowski; United States	Jean-Pierre Kurth; Switzerland
1984 Innsbruck	LW1	Helmut Falch; Austria	Andy Fasth; United States	Edwin Zurbriggen; Switzerland
1984 Innsbruck	LW2	Rainer Bergmann; Austria	Alexander Spitz; West Germany	Peter Perner; Austria
1984 Innsbruck	LW3	Paul Dibello; United States	Bernard Baudean; France	Gerhard Langer; Austria
1984 Innsbruck	LW4	Josef Meusburger; Austria	Paul Fournier; Switzerland	Eugen Diethelm; Switzerland
1984 Innsbruck	LW5/7	Niko Moll; West Germany	Felix Gisler; Switzerland	Felix Abele; West Germany
1984 Innsbruck	LW6/8	Dietmar Schweninger; Austria	Paul Neukomm; Switzerland	Meinhard Tatschl; Austria
1984 Innsbruck	LW9	Peter Bartlome; Switzerland	Walter Kälin; Switzerland	Robert Cadisch; Switzerland
1988 Innsbruck	B1	Franz Griessbacher; Austria	Mats Linder; Sweden	John Houston; Canada
1988 Innsbruck	B2	Odo Habermann; Austria	Stephane Saas; France	Gerhard Pscheider; Austria
1988 Innsbruck	B3	Bruno Oberhammer; Italy	Uli Rompel; Canada	Manfred Perfler; Italy
1988 Innsbruck	LW1	Dan Ashbaugh; United States	Mark Godfrey; United States	Tsutomu Mino; Japan
1988 Innsbruck	LW2	Alexander Spitz; West Germany	Greg Mannino; United States	Rainer Bergmann; Austria
1988 Innsbruck	LW3	Paul Dibello; United States	Bernard Baudean; France	Gerhard Langer; Austria
1988 Innsbruck	LW4	Josef Meusburger; Austria	Markus Ramsauer; Austria	Hans Burn; Switzerland
1988 Innsbruck	LW5/7	Cato Zahl Pedersen; Norway	Lars Lundstroem; Sweden	Matthias Berg; West Germany
1988 Innsbruck	LW6/8	Meinhard Tatschl; Austria	Markus Pfefferle; West Germany	Paul Neukomm; Switzerland
1988 Innsbruck	LW9	Tristan Mouric; France	Eberhard Seischab; West Germany	Robert Stroshine; United States
1988 Innsbruck	LW10	Paul Bluschke; Austria	Jacques Blanc; Switzerland	Hermann Kollau; Switzerland
1992 Tignes-Albertville	B2	Stephane Saas; France	Lars Nielsen; Denmark	Marcos Manuel Llados; Spain
1992 Tignes-Albertville	B3	Brian Santos; United States	Richard Burt; Great Britain	Bruno Oberhammer; Italy
1992 Tignes-Albertville	LW1,3,5/7,9	Gerd Schönfelder; Germany	Eberhard Seischab; Germany	Jean-Luc Jiguet; France
1992 Tignes-Albertville	LW2	Alexander Spitz; Germany	Greg Mannino; United States	Juerg Gadient; Switzerland
1992 Tignes-Albertville	LW4	Hans Burn; Switzerland	Rik Heid; United States	Wilfried Maetzler; Austria
1992 Tignes-Albertville	LW6/8	Lionel Brun; France	Markus Pfefferle; Germany	Chris Griffin; United States
1992 Tignes-Albertville	LW10	Reinhold Sager; Austria	Chris Waddell; United States	Matthew Stockford; Great Britain
1992 Tignes-Albertville	LW11	David Kiley; United States	Jacques Blanc; Switzerland	Karl Lotz; Germany
1994 Lillehammer	B1	Roy Boesiger; Switzerland	Franz Czuk; Austria	Leopold Ertl; Austria
1994 Lillehammer	B2	Stephane Saas; France	Manuel Buendia; Spain	Gerhard Pscheider; Austria
1994 Lillehammer	B3	Brian Santos; United States	Bruno Oberhammer; Italy	Richard Burt; Great Britain
1994 Lillehammer	LW1/3	Bernard Baudean; France	Jozef Mistina; Slovakia	Alexei Moshkine; Russia
1994 Lillehammer	LW2	Michael Milton; Australia	Alexander Spitz; Germany	Greg Mannino; United States
1994 Lillehammer	LW4	Rik Heid; United States	James Lagerstrom; United States	Patrick Cooper; New Zealand
1994 Lillehammer	LW5/7	Cato Zahl Pedersen; Norway	Gerd Schönfelder; Germany	Jean-Luc Jiguet; France
1994 Lillehammer	LW6/8	Frank Pfortmueller; Germany	Meinhard Tatschl; Austria	Hannes Huettenbrenner; Austria
1994 Lillehammer	LW9	Eberhard Seischab; Germany	Tristan Mouric; France	James Paterson; Australia
1994 Lillehammer	LWX	Chris Waddell; United States	Takashi Kurosu; Japan	Reinhold Sager; Austria
1994 Lillehammer	LWXI	John Davis; United States	Ryuei Shinohe; Japan	David Munk; Australia
1994 Lillehammer	LWXII	Paul Bluschke; Austria	Karl Lotz; Germany	Alain Marguerettaz; France
1998 Nagano	B1,3	Angelo Zanotti; Italy	Gianmaria Dal Maistro; Italy	Jean-Noel Arbez; France
1998 Nagano	B2	Eric Villalon; Spain	Stefan Kopcik; Slovakia	Gerhard Pscheider; Austria
1998 Nagano	LW1,3,5/7	Alexei Moshkine; Russia	Jozef Mistina; Slovakia	Gerd Schönfelder; Germany
1998 Nagano	LW2	Jason Lalla; United States	Monte Meier; United States	Greg Mannino; United States
1998 Nagano	LW4	Hans Burn; Switzerland	Michael Bruegger; Switzerland	Steven Bayley; New Zealand
1998 Nagano	LW6/8	Rolf Heinzmann; Switzerland	Markus Pfefferle; Germany	Wolfgang Moosbrugger; Austria
1998 Nagano	LW9	Matthew Butson; New Zealand	George Sansonetis; United States	Gilles Place; France
1998 Nagano	LW10	Gustav Gross; Germany	Andreas Schiestl; Austria	Reinhold Sager; Austria
1998 Nagano	LW11	Klaus Salzmann; Austria	Stacy Kohut; Canada	Karl Lotz; Germany
2002 Salt Lake City	B1-2	Eric Villalon; Guide: Pere Comet; Spain	Bart Bunting; Guide: Nathan Chivers; Australia	Radomir Dudas; Guide: Juraj Mikulas; Slovakia
2002 Salt Lake City	B3	Jon Santacana Maiztegui; Guide: Raul Capdevila; Spain	Gianmaria Dal Maistro; Guide: Guido Lanaro; Italy	Andrew Parr; Guide: David Marchi; United States
2002 Salt Lake City	LW2	Michael Milton; Australia	Jason Lalla; United States	Asle Tangvik; Norway
2002 Salt Lake City	LW3,5/7,9	Gerd Schönfelder; Germany	Romain Riboud; France	Arno Hirschbuehl; Austria
2002 Salt Lake City	LW4	Steven Bayley; New Zealand	Hans Burn; Switzerland	Robert Meusburger; Austria
2002 Salt Lake City	LW6/8	Rolf Heinzmann; Switzerland	Lionel Brun; France	Frank Pfortmueller; Germany
2002 Salt Lake City	LW10	Martin Braxenthaler; Germany	Ronny Persson; Sweden	Chris Waddell; United States
2002 Salt Lake City	LW11	Harald Eder; Austria	Juergen Egle; Austria	Andreas Schiestl; Austria
2002 Salt Lake City	LW12	Hans Joerg Arnold; Switzerland	Sang Min Han; South Korea	Scott Patterson; Canada
2006 Turin	visually impaired	Nicolas Berejny; Guide: Sophie Troc; France	Gianmaria Dal Maistro; Guide: Tommaso Balasso; Italy	Eric Villalon; Guide: Hodei Yurrita; Spain
2006 Turin	sitting	Martin Braxenthaler; Germany	Taiki Morii; Japan	Juergen Egle; Austria
2006 Turin	standing	Gerd Schönfelder; Germany	Masahiko Tokai; Japan	Thomas Pfyl; Switzerland
2010 Vancouver	visually impaired	Jakub Krako; Guide: Juraj Medera; Slovakia	Jon Santacana Maiztegui; Guide: Miguel Galindo Garcés; Spain	Gianmaria dal Maistro; Guide: Tommaso Balasso; Italy
2010 Vancouver	sitting	Martin Braxenthaler; Germany	Christoph Kunz; Switzerland	Takeshi Suzuki; Japan
2010 Vancouver	standing	Gerd Schönfelder; Germany	Robert Meusburger; Austria	Vincent Gauthier-Manuel; France
2014 Sochi	visually impaired	Mac Marcoux; Guide: Robin Ferry; Canada	Jakub Krako; Guide: Martin Motyka; Slovakia	Valeii Redkozubov; Guide: Evgeny Geroev; Russia
2014 Sochi	sitting	Christoph Kunz; Switzerland	Corey Peters; New Zealand	Roman Rabl; Austria
2014 Sochi	standing	Vincent Gauthier-Manuel; France	Alexey Bugaev; Russia	Markus Salcher; Austria
2018 Pyeongchang	visually impaired	Giacomo Bertagnolli; Guide: Fabrizio Casal; Italy	Jakub Krako; Guide: Branislav Brozman; Slovakia	Mac Marcoux; Guide: Jack Leitch; Canada
2018 Pyeongchang	sitting	Jesper Pedersen; Norway	Tyler Walker; United States	Igor Sikorski; Poland
2018 Pyeongchang	standing	Théo Gmür; Switzerland	Alexey Bugaev; Neutral Paralympic Athletes	Alexis Guimond; Canada
2022 Beijing	visually impaired	Johannes Aigner; Guide: Matteo Fleischmann; Austria	Giacomo Bertagnolli; Guide: Andrea Ravelli; Italy	Miroslav Haraus; Guide: Maroš Hudík; Slovakia
2022 Beijing	sitting	Jesper Pedersen; Norway	René De Silvestro; Italy	Liang Zilu; China
2022 Beijing	standing	Santeri Kiiveri; Finland	Thomas Walsh; United States	Arthur Bauchet; France

=== Super-G ===
Games	Class	Gold	Silver	Bronze
1992 Tignes-Albertville	B1	Bruno Kuehne; Austria	Greg Evangelatos; United States	Mats Linder; Sweden
1992 Tignes-Albertville	B2	Stephane Saas; France	Manuel Buendía; Spain	Odo Habermann; Austria
1992 Tignes-Albertville	B3	Brian Santos; United States	Bruno Oberhammer; Italy	Richard Burt; Great Britain
1992 Tignes-Albertville	LW1,3,5/7,9	Gerd Schönfelder; Germany	Jean-Luc Jiguet; France	Jeff Dickson; Canada
1992 Tignes-Albertville	LW2	Greg Mannino; United States	Michael Milton; Australia	Alexander Spitz; Germany
1992 Tignes-Albertville	LW4	Patrick Cooper; New Zealand	Rik Heid; United States	Hans Burn; Switzerland
1992 Tignes-Albertville	LW6/8	Meinhard Tatschl; Austria	Frank Pfortmueller; Germany	Markus Pfefferle; Germany
1992 Tignes-Albertville	LW10	Chad Colley; United States	Bruno Fallet; Switzerland	Matthew Stockford; Great Britain
1992 Tignes-Albertville	LW11	David Kiley; United States	Jacques Blanc; Switzerland	David Munk; Australia
1994 Lillehammer	B1	David Sundstroem; Sweden	Vicente Garcia Salmeron; Spain	Willy Mercier; Belgium
1994 Lillehammer	B2	Stephane Saas; France	Manuel Buendia; Spain	Juan Carlos Molina; Spain
1994 Lillehammer	B3	Brian Santos; United States	Bruno Oberhammer; Italy	Richard Burt; Great Britain
1994 Lillehammer	LW1/3	Alexei Moshkine; Russia	Bernard Baudean; France	Jozef Mistina; Slovakia
1994 Lillehammer	LW2	Greg Mannino; United States	Alexander Spitz; Germany	Michael Milton; Australia
1994 Lillehammer	LW4	Patrick Cooper; New Zealand	Rik Heid; United States	Hans Burn; Switzerland
1994 Lillehammer	LW5/7	Cato Zahl Pedersen; Norway	Gerd Schönfelder; Germany	Jean-Luc Jiguet; France
1994 Lillehammer	LW6/8	Frank Pfortmueller; Germany	Rolf Heinzmann; Switzerland	Lionel Brun; France
1994 Lillehammer	LW9	Tristan Mouric; France	Arno Hirschbuehl; Austria	Eberhard Seischab; Germany
1994 Lillehammer	LWX	Chris Waddell; United States	Helmut Wolf; Italy	Matthew Stockford; Great Britain
1994 Lillehammer	LWXI	Michael Norton; Australia	Michael McDougal; United States	William Bowness; United States
1994 Lillehammer	LWXII	Stacy Kohut; Canada	Paul Bluschke; Austria	Karl Lotz; Germany
1998 Nagano	B1,3	Angelo Zanotti; Italy	Jean-Noel Arbez; France	Bruno Oberhammer; Italy
1998 Nagano	B2	Eric Villalon; Spain	Kurt Primus; Austria	Stefan Kopcik; Slovakia
1998 Nagano	LW1,3,5/7	Kevin O'Sullivan; New Zealand	Jacob Rife; United States	Jozef Mistina; Slovakia
1998 Nagano	LW2	Greg Mannino; United States	Michael Hipp; Germany	Juerg Gadient; Switzerland
1998 Nagano	LW4	Hubert Mandl; Austria	Hans Burn; Switzerland	Mark Ludbrook; Canada
1998 Nagano	LW6/8	Rolf Heinzmann; Switzerland	Markus Pfefferle; Germany	Frank Pfortmueller; Germany
1998 Nagano	LW9	Matthew Butson; New Zealand	Arno Hirschbuehl; Austria	George Sansonetis; United States
1998 Nagano	LW10	Gustav Gross; Germany	Chris Waddell; United States	Martin Braxenthaler; Germany
1998 Nagano	LW11	Daniel Wesley; Canada	Stacy Kohut; Canada	Raynald Riu; France
2002 Salt Lake City	B1-3	Bart Bunting; Guide: Nathan Chivers; Australia	Eric Villalon; Guide: Pere Comet; Spain	Jon Santacana Maiztegui; Guide: Raul Capdevila; Spain
2002 Salt Lake City	LW2	Michael Milton; Australia	Christian Lanthaler; Italy	Florian Planker; Italy
2002 Salt Lake City	LW3,5/7,9	Gerd Schönfelder; Germany	Romain Riboud; France	Arno Hirschbuehl; Austria
2002 Salt Lake City	LW4	Hubert Mandl; Austria	Josef Schößwendter; Austria	Steven Bayley; New Zealand
2002 Salt Lake City	LW6/8	Rolf Heinzmann; Switzerland	Lionel Brun; France	Wolfgang Moosbrugger; Austria
2002 Salt Lake City	LW10	Martin Braxenthaler; Germany	Ronny Persson; Sweden	Michael Kroener; Germany
2002 Salt Lake City	LW11	Fabrizio Zardini; Italy	Andreas Schiestl; Austria	Denis Barbet; France
2002 Salt Lake City	LW12	Chris Devlin-Young; United States	Daniel Wesley; Canada	Ludwig Wolf; Germany
2006 Turin	visually impaired	Gianmaria Dal Maistro; Guide: Tommaso Balasso; Italy	Radomir Dudas; Guide: Maros Hudik; Slovakia	Chris Williamson; Guide: Robert Taylor; Canada
2006 Turin	sitting	Martin Braxenthaler; Germany	Harald Eder; Austria	Robert Fröhle; Austria
2006 Turin	standing	Walter Lackner; Austria	Gerd Schönfelder; Germany	Toby Kane; Australia
2010 Vancouver	visually impaired	Nicolas Berejny; Guide: Sophie Troc; France	Jakub Krako; Guide: Juraj Medera; Slovakia	Miroslav Haraus; Guide: Martin Makovnik; Slovakia
2010 Vancouver	sitting	Akira Kano; Japan	Martin Braxenthaler; Germany	Taiki Morii; Japan
2010 Vancouver	standing	Gerd Schönfelder; Germany	Vincent Gauthier-Manuel; France	Hubert Mandl; Austria
2014 Sochi	visually impaired	Jakub Krako; Guide: Martin Motyka; Slovakia	Mark Bathum; Guide: Cade Yamamoto; United States	Mac Marcoux; Guide: Robin Ferry; Canada
2014 Sochi	sitting	Akira Kano; Japan	Taiki Morii; Japan	Caleb Brousseau; Canada
2014 Sochi	standing	Markus Salcher; Austria	Matthias Lanzinger; Austria	Alexey Bugaev; Russia
2018 Pyeongchang	visually impaired	Jakub Krako; Guide: Branislav Brozman; Slovakia	Giacomo Bertagnolli; Guide: Fabrizio Casal; Italy	Miroslav Haraus; Guide: Maroš Hudik; Slovakia
2018 Pyeongchang	sitting	Kurt Oatway; Canada	Andrew Kurka; United States	Frédéric François; France
2018 Pyeongchang	standing	Théo Gmür; Switzerland	Arthur Bauchet; France	Markus Salcher; Austria
2022 Beijing	visually impaired	Neil Simpson; Guide: Andrew Simpson; Great Britain	Giacomo Bertagnolli; Guide: Andrea Ravelli; Italy	Johannes Aigner; Guide: Matteo Fleischmann; Austria
2022 Beijing	sitting	Jesper Pedersen; Norway	Corey Peters; New Zealand	Taiki Morii; Japan
2022 Beijing	standing	Liang Jingyi; China	Markus Saicher; Austria	Alexis Guimond; Canada

=== Combined ===
Games	Class	Gold	Silver	Bronze
1976 Örnsköldsvik	I	Hans Strasser; West Germany	Franz Meister; Austria	Walter Laurer; Austria
1976 Örnsköldsvik	II	Herbert Millendorfer; Austria	Eugen Diethelm; Switzerland	Remy Arnod; France
1976 Örnsköldsvik	III	Heinz Moser; Switzerland	Manfred Brandl; Austria	Franz Perner; Austria
1976 Örnsköldsvik	IV A	Bernard Baudean; France	Richard Prager; West Germany	Anton Berger; Austria
1976 Örnsköldsvik	IV B	Horst Morokutti; Austria	Adolf Hagn; Austria	Willi Berger; Austria
1984 Innsbruck	B1	Karl Preining; Austria	Rod Hersey; Canada	Mike May; United States
1984 Innsbruck	B2	Mark Bentz; Canada	Uli Rompel; Canada	Bruno Oberhammer; Italy
1984 Innsbruck	LW1	Helmut Falch; Austria	Edwin Zurbriggen; Switzerland	None
1984 Innsbruck	LW2	Rainer Bergmann; Austria	Peter Perner; Austria	Alexander Spitz; West Germany
1984 Innsbruck	LW3	Paul Dibello; United States	Jack Benedick; United States	Gerhard Langer; Austria
1984 Innsbruck	LW4	Josef Meusburger; Austria	Paul Fournier; Switzerland	Ewald Vogl; West Germany
1984 Innsbruck	LW5/7	Niko Moll; West Germany	Felix Gisler; Switzerland	John Watkins; Great Britain
1984 Innsbruck	LW6/8	Rolf Heinzmann; Switzerland	Heinz Moser; Switzerland	Franc Komar; Yugoslavia
1984 Innsbruck	LW9	Peter Bartlome; Switzerland	Walter Kälin; Switzerland	None
2010 Vancouver	visually impaired	Jakub Krako; Guide: Juraj Medera; Slovakia	Gianmaria dal Maistro; Guide: Tommaso Balasso; Italy	Miroslav Haraus; Guide: Martin Makovnik; Slovakia
2010 Vancouver	sitting	Martin Braxenthaler; Germany	Jürgen Egle; Austria	Philipp Bonadimann; Austria
2010 Vancouver	standing	Gerd Schönfelder; Germany	Vincent Gauthier-Manuel; France	Cameron Rahles-Rahbula; Australia
2014 Sochi	visually impaired	Valerii Redkozubov; Guide: Evgeny Geroev; Russia	Mark Bathum; Guide: Cade Yamamoto; United States	Gabriel Juan Gorce Yepes; Guide: Josep Arnau Ferrer Ventura; Spain
2014 Sochi	sitting	Josh Dueck; Canada	Heath Calhoun; United States	Roman Rabl; Austria
2014 Sochi	standing	Alexey Bugaev; Russia	Matthias Lanzinger; Austria	Toby Kane; New Zealand
2018 Pyeongchang	visually impaired	Miroslav Haraus; Guide: Maroš Hudik; Slovakia	Jon Santacana Maiztegui; Guide: Miguel Galindo Garcés; Spain	Valery Redkozubov; Guide: Evgeny Geroev; Neutral Paralympic Athletes
2018 Pyeongchang	sitting	Jeroen Kampschreur; Netherlands	Frédéric François; France	Jesper Pedersen; Norway
2018 Pyeongchang	standing	Alexey Bugaev; Neutral Paralympic Athletes	Arthur Bauchet; France	Adam Hall; New Zealand
2022 Beijing	visually impaired	Giacomo Bertagnolli; Guide: Andrea Ravelli; Italy	Johannes Aigner; Guide: Matteo Fleischmann; Austria	Neil Simpson; Guide: Andrew Simpson; Great Britain
2022 Beijing	sitting	Jesper Pedersen; Norway	Jeroen Kampschreur; Netherlands	Niels de Langen; Netherlands
2022 Beijing	standing	Arthur Bauchet; France	Santeri Kiiveri; Finland	Adam Hall; New Zealand

== Women ==
=== Downhill ===
Games	Class	Gold	Silver	Bronze
1984 Innsbruck	B1	Veronika Preining; Austria	Sheila Holzworth; United States	Cara Dunne; United States
1984 Innsbruck	B2	Edith Hoelzl; Austria	Vivienne Martin; New Zealand	Connie Conley; United States
1984 Innsbruck	LW2	Christine Winkler; Austria	Marianne Reiter; Austria	Lynda Chyzyk; Canada
1984 Innsbruck	LW4	Reinhild Möller; West Germany	Lana Spreeman; Canada	Lana Jo Chapin; United States
1984 Innsbruck	LW5/7	Brigitte Madlener; Austria	Sabine Barisch; West Germany	Sabine Stiefbold; West Germany
1984 Innsbruck	LW6/8	Gunilla Ahren; Sweden	Kathy Poohachof; United States	Gerlinde Dullnig; Austria
1988 Innsbruck	B1	Susana Herrera; Spain	Cara Dunne; United States	Carmela Cantisani; Italy
1988 Innsbruck	B2	Elisabeth Kellner; Austria	Edith Hoelzl; Austria	Gabriele Berghofer; Austria
1988 Innsbruck	LW2	Diana Golden; United States	Martha Hill; United States	Annemie Schneider; West Germany
1988 Innsbruck	LW4	Reinhild Möller; West Germany	Lana Jo Chapin; United States	Lana Spreeman; Canada
1988 Innsbruck	LW6/8	Martina Altenberger; Austria	Nancy Gustafson; United States	Gunilla Ahren; Sweden
1992 Tignes-Albertville	LW2	Sarah Billmeier; United States	Cathy Gentile-Patti; United States	Roni Sasaki; United States
1992 Tignes-Albertville	LW3,4,9	Reinhild Möller; Germany	Barbara Jordan; Austria	Lana Spreeman; Canada
1992 Tignes-Albertville	LW5/7,6/8	Nancy Gustafson; United States	Sandra Lynes; Canada	Caroline Viau; Canada
1992 Tignes-Albertville	LW10-11	Sarah Will; United States	Gerda Pamler; Germany	Candace Cable; United States
1994 Lillehammer	B1-2	Joanne Duffy; New Zealand	Magda Amo; Spain	Izaskun Manuel Llados; Spain
1994 Lillehammer	LW2	Sarah Billmeier; United States	Helga Erhart; Austria	Beate Salen; Germany
1994 Lillehammer	LW3/4	Reinhild Möller; Germany	Renate Hjortland; Norway	Lana Spreeman; Canada
1994 Lillehammer	LW6/8	Nancy Gustafson; United States	Nadja Obrist; Austria	Ramona Hoh; Canada
1994 Lillehammer	LWX-XII	Sarah Will; United States	Kelley Fox; United States	Gerda Pamler; Germany
1998 Nagano	B1-3	Magda Amo; Guide: Ana Casas; Spain	Katerina Tepla; Guide: Pavel Teply; Czech Republic	Pascale Casanova; Guide: Mikael Genin; France
1998 Nagano	LW2	Sarah Billmeier; United States	Nicola Lechner; Austria	Maggie Behle; United States
1998 Nagano	LW3,4,6/8	Jennifer Kelchner; United States	Mary Riddell; United States	Nadja Obrist; Austria
1998 Nagano	LW10-11	Kuniko Obinata; Japan	Sarah Will; United States	Cecilia Paulson; Sweden
2002 Salt Lake City	B2-3	Pascale Casanova; Guide: Mikael Genin; France	Katerina Tepla; Guide: Renata Karamanova; Czech Republic	Gabriele Huemer; Guide: Maximilian Huemer; Austria
2002 Salt Lake City	LW2	Danja Haslacher; Austria	Sarah Billmeier; United States	Inga Medvedeva; Russia
2002 Salt Lake City	LW3,4,6/8,9	Rachael Battersby; New Zealand	Csilla Kristof; United States	Karolina Wisniewska; Canada
2002 Salt Lake City	LW10-12	Sarah Will; United States	Muffy Davis; United States	Stephani Victor; United States
2006 Turin	visually impaired	Pascale Casanova; Guide: Benedicte Sainas; France	Sabine Gasteiger; Guide: Emil Gasteiger; Austria	Silvia Parente; Guide: Lorenzo Migliari; Italy
2006 Turin	sitting	Laurie Stephens; United States	Kuniko Obinata; Japan	Claudia Lösch; Austria
2006 Turin	standing	Solène Jambaqué; France	Reinhild Möller; Germany	Iveta Chlebakova; Slovakia
2010 Vancouver	visually impaired	Viviane Forest; Guide: Lindsay Debou; Canada	Henrieta Farkašová; Guide: Natália Šubrtová; Slovakia	Danelle Umstead; Guide: Rob Umstead; United States
2010 Vancouver	sitting	Alana Nichols; United States	Laurie Stephens; United States	Claudia Lösch; Austria
2010 Vancouver	standing	Lauren Woolstencroft; Canada	Solène Jambaqué; France	Andrea Rothfuss; Germany
2014 Sochi	visually impaired	Henrieta Farkašová; Guide: Natália Šubrtová; Slovakia	Jade Etherington; Guide: Caroline Powell; Great Britain	Aleksandra Frantceva; Guide: Pavel Zabotin; Russia
2014 Sochi	sitting	Anna Schaffelhuber; Germany	Alana Nichols; United States	Laurie Stephens; United States
2014 Sochi	standing	Marie Bochet; France	Inga Medvedeva; Russia	Allison Jones; United States
2018 Pyeongchang	visually impaired	Henrieta Farkašová; Guide: Natália Šubrtová; Slovakia	Millie Knight; Guide: Brett Wild; Great Britain	Eléonor Sana; Guide: Chloe Sana; Belgium
2018 Pyeongchang	sitting	Anna Schaffelhuber; Germany	Momoka Muraoka; Japan	Laurie Stephens; United States
2018 Pyeongchang	standing	Marie Bochet; France	Andrea Rothfuss; Germany	Mollie Jepsen; Canada
2022 Beijing	visually impaired	Henrieta Farkašová; Guide: Martin Motyka; Slovakia	Zhu Daqing; Guide: Yan Hanhan; China	Millie Knight; Guide: Brett Wild; Great Britain
2022 Beijing	sitting	Momoka Muraoka; Japan	Anna-Lena Forster; Germany	Liu Sitong; China
2022 Beijing	standing	Mollie Jepsen; Canada	Zhang Mengqiu; China	Ebba Årsjö; Sweden

=== Slalom ===
Games	Class	Gold	Silver	Bronze
1976 Örnsköldsvik	I	Annemie Schneider; West Germany	Ursula Steiger; Austria	Brigitte Rajchl; Austria
1976 Örnsköldsvik	II	Irene Moillen; Switzerland	Heidi Jauk; Austria	Lorna Manzer; Canada
1976 Örnsköldsvik	III	Eva Lemezova; Czechoslovakia	Traudl Weber; West Germany	None
1976 Örnsköldsvik	IV B	Petra Merkott; West Germany	None	None
1980 Geilo	1A	Annemie Schneider; West Germany	Christine Winkler; Austria	Ursula Steiger; Austria
1980 Geilo	2A	Lorna Manzer; Canada	Heidi Jauk; Austria	Reinhild Möller; West Germany
1980 Geilo	2B	Elisabeth Osterwalder; Switzerland	None	None
1980 Geilo	3A	Cindy Castellano; United States	Eva Lemezova; Czechoslovakia	Franciane Fischer; Switzerland
1980 Geilo	3B	Sabine Barisch; West Germany	Brigitte Madlener; Austria	Evelyn Werner; West Germany
1984 Innsbruck	LW2	Marianne Reiter; Austria	Christine Winkler; Austria	Bonnie St. John; United States
1984 Innsbruck	LW4	Janet Penn; United States	Reinhild Möller; West Germany	Elisabeth Zerobin; Austria
1984 Innsbruck	LW5/7	Sabine Stiefbold; West Germany	Brigitte Madlener; Austria	Sabine Barisch; West Germany
1984 Innsbruck	LW6/8	Gunilla Ahren; Sweden	Kathy Poohachof; United States	Eszbieta Dadok; Poland
1988 Innsbruck	LW2	Lynda Chyzyk; Canada	Martha Hill; United States	Virginie Lopez; France
1988 Innsbruck	LW4	Reinhild Möller; West Germany	Lana Spreeman; Canada	Beatrice Berthet; Switzerland
1988 Innsbruck	LW6/8	Martina Altenberger; Austria	Gunilla Ahren; Sweden	Eszbieta Dadok; Poland
1988 Innsbruck	LW10	Francoise Jacquerod; Switzerland	None	None
1992 Tignes-Albertville	LW2	Helga Knapp; Austria	Nadine Laurent; France	Roni Sasaki; United States
1992 Tignes-Albertville	LW3,4,9	Reinhild Möller; Germany	Lana Spreeman; Canada	Barbara Jordan; Austria
1992 Tignes-Albertville	LW5/7,6/8	Nancy Gustafson; United States	Maria Sund; Sweden	Marcela Misunova; Czechoslovakia
1992 Tignes-Albertville	LW10-11	Gerda Pamler; Germany	Candace Cable; United States	Toshiko Gouno; Japan
1994 Lillehammer	B1-2	Asa Bengtsson; Sweden	Izaskun Manuel Llados; Spain	Silvia Parente; Italy
1994 Lillehammer	LW2	Helga Erhart; Austria	Sarah Billmeier; United States	Beate Salen; Germany
1994 Lillehammer	LW3/4	Reinhild Möller; Germany	Lana Spreeman; Canada	Carmen Haderer; Austria
1994 Lillehammer	LW6/8	Nancy Gustafson; United States	Ramona Hoh; Canada	Marcela Misunova; Slovakia
1994 Lillehammer	LWX-XII	Sarah Will; United States	Kelley Fox; United States	Vreni Stoeckli; Switzerland
1998 Nagano	B1,3	Katerina Tepla; Guide: Pavel Teply; Czech Republic	Sabina Rogie; Guide: Michal Karasek; Czech Republic	Marilyn Winder; Guide: Dale Winder; Canada
1998 Nagano	B2	Magda Amo; Guide: Ana Casas; Spain	Pascale Casanova; Guide: Mikael Genin; France	Theresa Fancher; Guide: Jon-Pierre Wolfenden; United States
1998 Nagano	LW2	Sarah Billmeier; United States	Nicola Lechner; Austria	Maggie Behle; United States
1998 Nagano	LW3,4,5/7,6/8	Reinhild Möller; Germany	Nadja Obrist; Austria	Mary Riddell; United States
1998 Nagano	LW10-11	Sarah Will; United States	Tatsuko Aoki; Japan	Muffy Davis; United States
2002 Salt Lake City	B2-3	Gabriele Huemer; Guide: Maximilian Huemer; Austria	Pascale Casanova; Guide: Mikael Genin; France	Sabina Rogie; Guide: Michal Karasek; Czech Republic
2002 Salt Lake City	LW2	Danja Haslacher; Austria	Sarah Billmeier; United States	Sandy Dukat; United States
2002 Salt Lake City	LW3,4,9	Lauren Woolstencroft; Canada	Karolina Wisniewska; Canada	Jennifer Kelchner; United States
2002 Salt Lake City	LW6/8	Rachael Battersby; New Zealand	Csilla Kristof; United States	Iveta Chlebakova; Slovakia
2002 Salt Lake City	LW10-12	Sarah Will; United States	Cecilia Paulson; Sweden	Kuniko Obinata; Japan
2006 Turin	visually impaired	Pascale Casanova; Guide: Benedicte Sainas; France	Sabine Gasteiger; Guide: Emil Gasteiger; Austria	Silvia Parente; Guide: Lorenzo Migliari; Italy
2006 Turin	sitting	Stephani Victor; United States	Daila Dameno; Italy	Tatsuko Aoki; Japan
2006 Turin	standing	Allison Jones; United States	Solène Jambaqué; France	Sandy Dukat; United States
2010 Vancouver	visually impaired	Sabine Gasteiger; Guide: Stefan Schoner; Austria	Viviane Forest; Guide: Lindsay Debou; Canada	Jessica Gallagher; Guide: Eric Bickerton; Australia
2010 Vancouver	sitting	Claudia Lösch; Austria	Stephani Victor; United States	Kuniko Obinata; Japan
2010 Vancouver	standing	Lauren Woolstencroft; Canada	Andrea Rothfuss; Germany	Karolina Wisniewska; Canada
2014 Sochi	visually impaired	Aleksandra Frantceva; Guide: Pavel Zabotin; Russia	Jade Etherington; Guide: Caroline Powell; Great Britain	Henrieta Farkašová; Guide: Natália Šubrtová; Slovakia
2014 Sochi	sitting	Anna Schaffelhuber; Germany	Anna-Lena Forster; Germany	Kimberly Joines; Canada
2014 Sochi	standing	Andrea Rothfuss; Germany	Inga Medvedeva; Russia	Petra Smaržová; Slovakia
2018 Pyeongchang	visually impaired	Menna Fitzpatrick; Guide: Jennifer Kehoe; Great Britain	Henrieta Farkašová; Guide: Natália Šubrtová; Slovakia	Millie Knight; Guide: Brett Wild; Great Britain
2018 Pyeongchang	sitting	Anna-Lena Forster; Germany	Momoka Muraoka; Japan	Heike Eder; Austria
2018 Pyeongchang	standing	Marie Bochet; France	Mollie Jepsen; Canada	Andrea Rothfuss; Germany
2022 Beijing	visually impaired	Veronika Aigner; Guide: Elisabeth Aigner; Austria	Barbara Aigner; Guide: Klara Sykora; Austria	Alexandra Rexová; Guide: Eva Trajčíková; Slovakia
2022 Beijing	sitting	Anna-Lena Forster; Germany	Zhang Wenjing; China	Liu Sitong; China
2022 Beijing	standing	Ebba Årsjö; Sweden	Zhang Mengqiu; China	Anna-Maria Rieder; Germany

=== Giant slalom ===
Games	Class	Gold	Silver	Bronze
1976 Örnsköldsvik	I	Annemie Schneider; West Germany	Brigitte Rajchl; Austria	Ursula Steiger; Austria
1976 Örnsköldsvik	II	Irene Moillen; Switzerland	Heidi Jauk; Austria	Lorna Manzer; Canada
1976 Örnsköldsvik	III	Eva Lemezova; Czechoslovakia	Traudl Weber; West Germany	None
1976 Örnsköldsvik	IV A	Elisabeth Osterwalder; Switzerland	None	None
1976 Örnsköldsvik	IV B	Petra Merkott; West Germany	None	None
1980 Geilo	1A	Annemie Schneider; West Germany	Christine Winkler; Austria	Brigitte Rajchl; Austria
1980 Geilo	2A	Lana Spreeman; Canada	Lorna Manzer; Canada	Janet Penn; United States
1980 Geilo	2B	Elisabeth Osterwalder; Switzerland	None	None
1980 Geilo	3A	Cindy Castellano; United States	Kathy Poohachof; United States	Franciane Fischer; Switzerland
1980 Geilo	3B	Brigitte Madlener; Austria	Sabine Barisch; West Germany	Sabine Stiefbold; West Germany
1984 Innsbruck	B1	Sheila Holzworth; United States	Cara Dunne; United States	Veronika Preining; Austria
1984 Innsbruck	B2	Vivienne Martin; New Zealand	Connie Conley; United States	Gabriele Berghofer; Austria
1984 Innsbruck	LW2	Christine Winkler; Austria	Lynda Chyzyk; Canada	Bonnie St. John; United States
1984 Innsbruck	LW4	Reinhild Möller; West Germany	Lana Spreeman; Canada	Janet Penn; United States
1984 Innsbruck	LW5/7	Brigitte Madlener; Austria	Sabine Stiefbold; West Germany	Sabine Barisch; West Germany
1984 Innsbruck	LW6/8	Gunilla Ahren; Sweden	Kathy Poohachof; United States	Eszbieta Dadok; Poland
1988 Innsbruck	B1	Elisabeth Maxwald; Austria	Cara Dunne; United States	Susana Herrera; Spain
1988 Innsbruck	B2	Elisabeth Kellner; Austria	Gabriele Berghofer; Austria	Edith Hoelzl; Austria
1988 Innsbruck	LW2	Diana Golden; United States	Annemie Schneider; West Germany	Virginie Lopez; France
1988 Innsbruck	LW4	Reinhild Möller; West Germany	Lana Jo Chapin; United States	Beatrice Berthet; Switzerland
1988 Innsbruck	LW6/8	Martina Altenberger; Austria	Kathy Pitcher; United States	Eszbieta Dadok; Poland
1988 Innsbruck	LW10	Francoise Jacquerod; Switzerland	Marilyn Hamilton; United States	Emiko Ikeda; Japan
1992 Tignes-Albertville	B1-3	Elisabeth Dos-Kellner; Austria	Katerina Tepla; Czechoslovakia	Magda Amo; Spain
1992 Tignes-Albertville	LW2	Sarah Billmeier; United States	Cathy Gentile-Patti; United States	Nadine Laurent; France
1992 Tignes-Albertville	LW3,4,9	Reinhild Möller; Germany	Barbara Jordan; Austria	Lana Spreeman; Canada
1992 Tignes-Albertville	LW5/7,6/8	Nancy Gustafson; United States	Sandra Lynes; Canada	Caroline Viau; Canada
1992 Tignes-Albertville	LW10-11	Marit Ruth; Sweden	Shannon Bloedel; United States	Candace Cable; United States
1994 Lillehammer	B1-2	Elisabeth Kellner; Austria	Gabriele Huemer; Austria	Asa Bengtsson; Sweden
1994 Lillehammer	LW2	Adrienne Rivera; United States	Helga Erhart; Austria	Annemie Schneider; Germany
1994 Lillehammer	LW3/4	Reinhild Möller; Germany	Renate Hjortland; Norway	Lana Spreeman; Canada
1994 Lillehammer	LW6/8	Nancy Gustafson; United States	Dagmar Vollmer; Germany	Nadja Obrist; Austria
1994 Lillehammer	LWX-XII	Gerda Pamler; Germany	Vreni Stoeckli; Switzerland	Stephanie Riche; France
1998 Nagano	B1,3	Katerina Tepla; Guide: Pavel Teply; Czech Republic	Sabina Rogie; Guide: Michal Karasek; Czech Republic	Marilyn Winder; Guide: Dale Winder; Canada
1998 Nagano	B2	Magda Amo; Guide: Ana Casas; Spain	Pascale Casanova; Guide: Mikael Genin; France	Elisabeth Dos-Kellner; Guide: Susanne Wastian; Austria
1998 Nagano	LW2	Danja Haslacher; Austria	Nicola Lechner; Austria	Sarah Billmeier; United States
1998 Nagano	LW3,4,5/7,6/8	Mary Riddell; United States	Karolina Wisniewska; Canada	Ramona Hoh; Canada
1998 Nagano	LW10-11	Sarah Will; United States	Vreni Stoeckli; Switzerland	Kuniko Obinata; Japan
2002 Salt Lake City	B2-3	Katerina Tepla; Guide: Renata Karamanova; Czech Republic	Pascale Casanova; Guide: Mikael Genin; France	Sabina Rogie; Guide: Michal Karasek; Czech Republic
2002 Salt Lake City	LW2	Danja Haslacher; Austria	Allison Jones; United States	Nicola Lechner; Austria
2002 Salt Lake City	LW3,4,9	Mary Riddell; United States	Karolina Wisniewska; Canada	Lauren Woolstencroft; Canada
2002 Salt Lake City	LW6/8	Rachael Battersby; New Zealand	Csilla Kristof; United States	Iveta Chlebakova; Slovakia
2002 Salt Lake City	LW10-11	Sarah Will; United States	Muffy Davis; United States	Lacey Heward; United States
2002 Salt Lake City	LW12	Allison Pearl; United States	Cecilia Paulson; Sweden	Kuniko Obinata; Japan
2006 Turin	visually impaired	Silvia Parente; Guide: Lorenzo Migliari; Italy	Pascale Casanova; Guide: Benedicte Sainas; France	Sabine Gasteiger; Guide: Emil Gasteiger; Austria
2006 Turin	sitting	Kuniko Obinata; Japan	Laurie Stephens; United States	Daila Dameno; Italy
2006 Turin	standing	Lauren Woolstencroft; Canada	Andrea Rothfuss; Germany	Solène Jambaqué; France
2010 Vancouver	visually impaired	Henrieta Farkašová; Guide: Natália Šubrtová; Slovakia	Sabine Gasteiger; Guide: Stefan Schoner; Austria	Viviane Forest; Guide: Lindsay Debou; Canada
2010 Vancouver	sitting	Alana Nichols; United States	Stephani Victor; United States	Kuniko Obinata; Japan
2010 Vancouver	standing	Lauren Woolstencroft; Canada	Andrea Rothfuss; Germany	Petra Smaržová; Slovakia
2014 Sochi	visually impaired	Henrieta Farkašová; Guide: Natália Šubrtová; Slovakia	Aleksandra Frantceva; Guide: Pavel Zabotin; Russia	Jessica Gallagher; Guide: Christian Geiger; Australia
2014 Sochi	sitting	Anna Schaffelhuber; Germany	Claudia Loesch; Austria	Anna-Lena Forster; Germany
2014 Sochi	standing	Marie Bochet; France	Andrea Rothfuss; Germany	Solène Jambaqué; France
2018 Pyeongchang	visually impaired	Henrieta Farkašová; Guide: Natália Šubrtová; Slovakia	Menna Fitzpatrick; Guide: Jennifer Kehoe; Great Britain	Melissa Perrine; Guide: Christian Geiger; Australia
2018 Pyeongchang	sitting	Momoka Muraoka; Japan	Linda van Impelen; Netherlands	Claudia Lösch; Austria
2018 Pyeongchang	standing	Marie Bochet; France	Andrea Rothfuss; Germany	Mollie Jepsen; Canada
2022 Beijing	visually impaired	Veronika Aigner; Guide: Elisabeth Aigner; Austria	Zhu Daqing; Guide: Yan Hanhan; China	Barbara Aigner; Guide: Klara Sykora; Austria
2022 Beijing	sitting	Momoka Muraoka; Japan	Liu Sitong; China	Zhang Wenjing; China
2022 Beijing	standing	Zhang Mengqiu; China	Mollie Jepsen; Canada	Andrea Rothfuss; Germany

=== Super-G ===
Games	Class	Gold	Silver	Bronze
1992 Tignes-Albertville	B1-3	Elisabeth Dos-Kellner; Austria	Katerina Tepla; Czechoslovakia	Andrea Piribauer; Austria
1992 Tignes-Albertville	LW2	Roni Sasaki; United States	Sarah Billmeier; United States	Helga Knapp; Austria
1992 Tignes-Albertville	LW3,4,9	Reinhild Möller; Germany	Lana Spreeman; Canada	Renate Hjortland; Norway
1992 Tignes-Albertville	LW5/7,6/8	Caroline Viau; Canada	Marcela Misunova; Czechoslovakia	Dagmar Vollmer; Germany
1992 Tignes-Albertville	LW10-11	Sarah Will; United States	Gerda Pamler; Germany	Toshiko Gouno; Japan
1994 Lillehammer	B1-2	Gabriele Huemer; Austria	Elisabeth Kellner; Austria	Joanne Duffy; New Zealand
1994 Lillehammer	LW2	Sarah Billmeier; United States	Beate Salen; Germany	Adrienne Rivera; United States
1994 Lillehammer	LW3/4	Reinhild Möller; Germany	Renate Hjortland; Norway	Lana Spreeman; Canada
1994 Lillehammer	LW6/8	Nancy Gustafson; United States	Nadja Obrist; Austria	Dagmar Vollmer; Germany
1994 Lillehammer	LWX-XII	Sarah Will; United States	Gerda Pamler; Germany	Stephanie Riche; France
1998 Nagano	B1,3	Katerina Tepla; Guide: Pavel Teply; Czech Republic	Marilyn Winder; Guide: Dale Winder; Canada	Sabina Rogie; Guide: Michal Karasek; Czech Republic
1998 Nagano	B2	Magda Amo; Guide: Ana Casas; Spain	Pascale Casanova; Guide: Mikael Genin; France	Elisabeth Dos-Kellner; Guide: Susanne Wastian; Austria
1998 Nagano	LW2	Danja Haslacher; Austria	Sarah Billmeier; United States	Nicola Lechner; Austria
1998 Nagano	LW3,4,5/7,6/8	Reinhild Möller; Germany	Karolina Wisniewska; Canada	Mary Riddell; United States
1998 Nagano	LW10-11	Sarah Will; United States	Kuniko Obinata; Japan	Cecilia Paulson; Sweden
2002 Salt Lake City	B2-3	Katerina Tepla; Guide: Renata Karamanova; Czech Republic	Gabriele Huemer; Guide: Maximilian Huemer; Austria	Pascale Casanova; Guide: Mikael Genin; France
2002 Salt Lake City	LW2	Sarah Billmeier; United States	Allison Jones; United States	Sandy Dukat; United States
2002 Salt Lake City	LW3,4,6/8,9	Lauren Woolstencroft; Canada	Mary Riddell; United States	Karolina Wisniewska; Canada
2002 Salt Lake City	LW10-12	Sarah Will; United States	Muffy Davis; United States	Lacey Heward; United States
2006 Turin	visually impaired	Sabine Gasteiger; Guide: Emil Gasteiger; Austria	Anna Kulíšková; Guide: Martin Kulisek; Czech Republic	Silvia Parente; Guide: Lorenzo Migliari; Italy
2006 Turin	sitting	Laurie Stephens; United States	Kuniko Obinata; Japan	Kimberly Joines; Canada
2006 Turin	standing	Solène Jambaqué; France	Lauren Woolstencroft; Canada	Danja Haslacher; Austria
2010 Vancouver	visually impaired	Henrieta Farkašová; Guide: Natália Šubrtová; Slovakia	Viviane Forest; Guide: Lindsay Debou; Canada	Anna Kulíšková; Guide: Michaela Hubacova; Czech Republic
2010 Vancouver	sitting	Claudia Lösch; Austria	Alana Nichols; United States	Anna Schaffelhuber; Germany
2010 Vancouver	standing	Lauren Woolstencroft; Canada	Melania Corradini; Italy	Andrea Rothfuss; Germany
2014 Sochi	visually impaired	Kelly Gallager; Guide: Charlotte Evans; Great Britain	Aleksandra Frantceva; Guide: Pavel Zabotin; Russia	Jade Etherington; Guide: Caroline Powell; Great Britain
2014 Sochi	sitting	Anna Schaffelhuber; Germany	Claudia Lösch; Austria	Laurie Stephens; United States
2014 Sochi	standing	Marie Bochet; France	Solène Jambaqué; France	Stephanie Jallen; United States
2018 Pyeongchang	visually impaired	Henrieta Farkašová; Guide: Natália Šubrtová; Slovakia	Millie Knight; Guide: Brett Wild; Great Britain	Menna Fitzpatrick; Guide: Jennifer Kehoe; Great Britain
2018 Pyeongchang	sitting	Anna Schaffelhuber; Germany	Claudia Lösch; Austria	Momoka Muraoka; Japan
2018 Pyeongchang	standing	Marie Bochet; France	Andrea Rothfuss; Germany	Alana Ramsay; Canada
2022 Beijing	visually impaired	Alexandra Rexová; Guide: Eva Trajčíková; Slovakia	Menna Fitzpatrick; Guide: Gary Smith; Great Britain	Zhu Daqing; Guide: Yan Hanhan; China
2022 Beijing	sitting	Momoka Muraoka; Japan	Anna-Lena Forster; Germany	Zhang Wenjing; China
2022 Beijing	standing	Zhang Mengqiu; China	Marie Bochet; France	Alana Ramsay; Canada

=== Combined ===
Games	Class	Gold	Silver	Bronze
1976 Örnsköldsvik	I	Annemie Schneider; West Germany	Brigitte Rajchl; Austria	Ursula Steiger; Austria
1976 Örnsköldsvik	II	Irene Moillen; Switzerland	Heidi Jauk; Austria	None
1976 Örnsköldsvik	III	Eva Lemezova; Czechoslovakia	Traudl Weber; West Germany	None
1976 Örnsköldsvik	IV B	Petra Merkott; West Germany	None	None
1984 Innsbruck	B1	Sheila Holzworth; United States	Veronika Preining; Austria	Cara Dunne; United States
1984 Innsbruck	B2	Edith Hoelzl; Austria	Vivienne Martin; New Zealand	Connie Conley; United States
1984 Innsbruck	LW2	Christine Winkler; Austria	Bonnie St. John; United States	Lynda Chyzyk; Canada
1984 Innsbruck	LW4	Reinhild Möller; West Germany	Elisabeth Osterwalder; Switzerland	Elisabeth Zerobin; Austria
1984 Innsbruck	LW5/7	Brigitte Madlener; Austria	Sabine Stiefbold; West Germany	Sabine Barisch; West Germany
1984 Innsbruck	LW6/8	Gunilla Ahren; Sweden	Kathy Poohachof; United States	Eszbieta Dadok; Poland
2010 Vancouver	visually impaired	Henrieta Farkašová; Guide: Natália Šubrtová; Slovakia	Viviane Forest; Guide: Lindsay Debou; Canada	Danelle Umstead; Guide: Rob Umstead; United States
2010 Vancouver	sitting	Stephani Victor; United States	Claudia Lösch; Austria	Alana Nichols; United States
2010 Vancouver	standing	Lauren Woolstencroft; Canada	Solène Jambaqué; France	Karolina Wisniewska; Canada
2014 Sochi	visually impaired	Aleksandra Frantceva; Guide: Pavel Zabotin; Russia	Jade Etherington; Guide: Caroline Powell; Great Britain	Danielle Umstead; Guide: Robert Umstrad; United States
2014 Sochi	sitting	Anna Schaffelhuber; Germany	Anna-Lena Forster; Germany	None
2014 Sochi	standing	Marie Bochet; France	Andrea Rothfuss; Germany	Stephanie Jallen; United States
2018 Pyeongchang	visually impaired	Henrieta Farkašová; Guide: Natália Šubrtová; Slovakia	Menna Fitzpatrick; Guide: Jennifer Kehoe; Great Britain	Melissa Perrine; Guide: Christian Geiger; Australia
2018 Pyeongchang	sitting	Anna-Lena Forster; Germany	Anna Schaffelhuber; Germany	Momoka Muraoka; Japan
2018 Pyeongchang	standing	Mollie Jepsen; Canada	Andrea Rothfuss; Germany	Alana Ramsay; Canada
2022 Beijing	visually impaired	Henrieta Farkašová; Guide: Michal Červeň; Slovakia	Zhu Daqing; Guide: Yan Hanhan; China	Menna Fitzpatrick; Guide: Gary Smith; Great Britain
2022 Beijing	sitting	Anna-Lena Forster; Germany	Momoka Muraoka; Japan	Liu Sitong; China
2022 Beijing	standing	Ebba Årsjö; Sweden	Zhang Mengqiu; China	Alana Ramsay; Canada

== Statistics ==
=== Athlete medal leaders ===
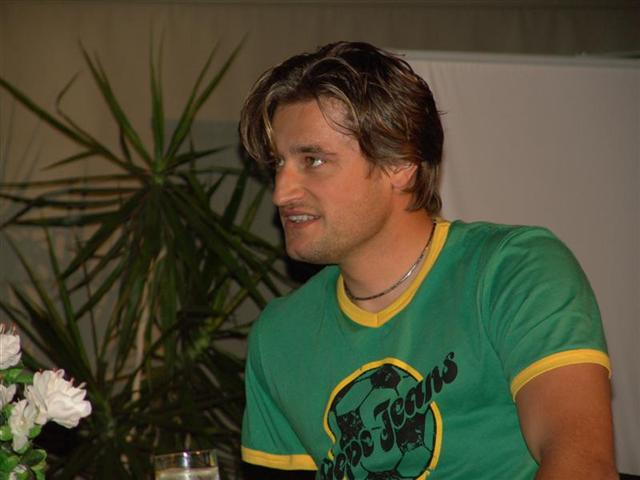
German Gerd Schönfelder is the most decorated alpine skier in the history of the Paralympic Games.

Athlete	Nation	Paralympics	Gold	Silver	Bronze	Total
Gerd Schönfelder	Germany (GER)	1992–2010	16	4	2	22
Reinhild Möller	West Germany (FRG) / Germany (GER)	1980–2006	16	2	1	19
Henrieta Farkašová	Slovakia (SVK)	2010–2022	11	2	1	14
Rolf Heinzmann	Switzerland (SUI)	1980–2002	12	2	0	14
Hans Burn	Switzerland (SUI)	1988–2002	6	5	3	14
Andrea Rothfuss	Germany (GER)	2006–2022	1	9	4	14
Sarah Will	United States (USA)	1992–2002	12	1	0	13
Sarah Billmeier	United States (USA)	1992–2002	7	5	1	13
Lana Spreeman	Canada (CAN)	1980–1994	1	6	6	13
Martin Braxenthaler	Germany (GER)	1998–2010	10	1	1	12
Greg Mannino	United States (USA)	1988–1998	6	4	2	12
Chris Waddell	United States (USA)	1992–2002	5	5	2	12
Bruno Oberhammer	Italy (ITA)	1984–1998	3	5	4	12
Markus Pfefferle	West Germany (FRG) / Germany (GER)	1988–2002	1	8	3	12
Bernard Baudean	France (FRA)	1976–1994	6	4	1	11
Michael Milton	Australia (AUS)	1992–2006	6	3	2	11
Alexander Spitz	West Germany (FRG) / Germany (GER)	1984–1994	4	4	3	11
Pascale Casanova	France (FRA)	1998–2006	3	6	2	11
Lauren Woolstencroft	Canada (CAN)	2002–2010	8	1	1	10
Tristan Mouric	France (FRA)	1984–1994	6	3	1	10
Jakub Krako	Slovakia (SVK)	2010–2018	5	5	0	10
Rik Heid	United States (USA)	1988–1994	2	5	3	10
Kuniko Obinata	Japan (JPN)	1998–2010	2	3	5	10
Marie Bochet	France (FRA)	2014–2022	8	1	0	9
Anna Schaffelhuber	Germany (GER)	2010–2018	7	1	1	9
Momoka Muraoka	Japan (JPN)	2018–2022	4	3	2	9
Jon Santacana Maiztegui	Spain (ESP)	2002–2018	3	4	2	9
Nancy Gustafson	United States (USA)	1988–1994	7	1	0	8
Josef Meusburger	Austria (AUT)	1976–1988	6	2	0	8
Anna-Lena Forster	Germany (GER)	2014–2022	4	3	1	8
Giacomo Bertagnolli	Italy (ITA)	2018–2022	4	3	1	8
Arthur Bauchet	France (FRA)	2018–2022	3	4	1	8
Cato Zahl Pedersen	Norway (NOR)	1980–1994	6	1	0	7
Jesper Pedersen	Norway (NOR)	2018–2022	5	1	1	7
Brian Santos	United States (USA)	1992–1994	6	0	0	6

=== Medals per year ===
Key

- bolded numbers indicate the highest medal count at that year's Paralympic Games.

Nation	76	80	84	88	92	94	98	02	06	10	14	18	22	Total
Australia (AUS)		–	–	–	4	9	2	7	2	4	2	2	—	32
Austria (AUT)	34	21	48	27	16	28	28	26	14	11	11	5	11	280
Belgium (BEL)			–	–	–	1			–	–	–	1	–	2
Canada (CAN)	3	5	14	8	12	7	12	12	5	13	–	10	6	107
Czech Republic (CZE)						1	7	5	1	1	–	–	–	15
Czechoslovakia (TCH)	3	1	–	–	4									8
Denmark (DEN)			–	–	1	–	–				–			1
France (FRA)	5	2	4	9	13	21	10	12	11	6	10	11	6	120
Germany (GER)					22	32	16	14	11	15	11	10	6	137
Great Britain (GBR)	–	–	1	–	5	4	–	–	–	–	5	7	5	27
Italy (ITA)		–	1	6	2	9	8	6	8	4	–	4	6	54
Japan (JPN)	–	–	–	2	2	6	5	2	6	7	5	6	6	47
Liechtenstein (LIE)					–	1								1
Netherlands (NED)			–	–	–	–	–			–	–	2	–	2
Neutral Paralympic Athletes (NPA)												4	–	4
New Zealand (NZL)		–	5	1	2	6	6	6	–	1	1	3	4	35
Norway (NOR)	–	2	–	2	1	6	–	1	–		–	2	5	19
Poland (POL)	–		4	3	–	–	–	–	–	–	–	1	–	8
Russia (RUS)						2	1	2	–	–	16			21
Slovakia (SVK)						5	9	6	2	11	7	11	–	51
South Korea (KOR)					–	–	–	1	–	–	–	–	–	1
Spain (ESP)			–	2	3	10	8	7	2	3	3	1	–	39
Sweden (SWE)		–	8	7	3	4	3	6		–	–	–	3	34
Switzerland (SUI)	10	9	25	14	10	7	15	9	2	3	1	3	1	108
United States (USA)	–	6	34	28	42	39	32	37	8	11	14	6	1	258
West Germany (FRG)	17	12	21	17										67
Yugoslavia (YUG)	–	–	1	–										1
Year	76	80	84	88	92	94	98	02	06	10	14	18	22	

=== Medal sweep events ===
These are events where athletes from one nation won all three medals.

Games	Event	Class	Gold	Silver	Bronze
1976 Örnsköldsvik	Men's combined	IV B	Horst Morokutti (AUT)	Adolf Hagn (AUT)	Willi Berger (AUT)
1980 Geilo	Men's slalom	2B	Gerhard Langer (AUT)	Anton Berger (AUT)	Anton Ledermaier (AUT)
1984 Innsbruck	Men's giant slalom	LW9	Peter Bartlome (SUI)	Walter Kälin (SUI)	Robert Cadisch (SUI)
1988 Innsbruck	Women's downhill	B2	Elisabeth Kellner (AUT)	Edith Hoelzl (AUT)	Gabriele Berghofer (AUT)
1988 Innsbruck	Women's giant slalom	B2	Elisabeth Kellner (AUT)	Gabriele Berghofer (AUT)	Edith Hoelzl (AUT)
1992 Tignes-Albertville	Women's downhill	LW2	Sarah Billmeier (USA)	Cathy Gentile-Patti (USA)	Roni Sasaki (USA)
1998 Nagano	Men's giant slalom	LW2	Jason Lalla (USA)	Monte Meier (USA)	Greg Mannino (USA)
2002 Salt Lake	Men's giant slalom	LW11	Harald Eder (AUT)	Juergen Egle (AUT)	Andreas Schiestl (AUT)
2002 Salt Lake	Women's giant slalom	LW10-11	Sarah Will (USA)	Muffy Davis (USA)	Lacey Heward (USA)
2002 Salt Lake	Women's downhill	LW10-12	Sarah Will (USA)	Muffy Davis (USA)	Stephani Victor (USA)
2002 Salt Lake	Women's Super-G	LW2	Sarah Billmeier (USA)	Allison Jones (USA)	Sandy Dukat (USA)
2002 Salt Lake	Women's Super-G	LW10-12	Sarah Will (USA)	Muffy Davis (USA)	Lacey Heward (USA)

== See also ==
- List of Olympic medalists in alpine skiing
- Lists of Paralympic medalists
