= Virginie Lopez =

French para-alpine skier

Sport
- Country: France
- Sport: Para-alpine skiing
Medal record
Paralympic Games
Bronze medal – third place	1988 Innsbruck	Giant Slalom LW2
Bronze medal – third place	1988 Innsbruck	Slalom LW2

Virginie Lopez is a French para-alpine skier. She represented France in alpine skiing at four Winter Paralympics: in 1980, 1984, 1988 and 1992

She won the bronze medal in the Women's Giant Slalom LW2 event and also in the Women's Slalom LW2 event at the 1988 Winter Paralympics.

== See also ==
- List of Paralympic medalists in alpine skiing
