= France at the 1984 Winter Paralympics =

- IPC code: FRA
- NPC: French Paralympic and Sports Committee
- Website: france-paralympique.fr
- Competitors: 16 (14 men and 2 women) in 2 sports
- Medals Ranked 8th: Gold 4 Silver 2 Bronze 0 Total 6

Winter Paralympics appearances (overview)
- 1976; 1980; 1984; 1988; 1992; 1994; 1998; 2002; 2006; 2010; 2014; 2018; 2022; 2026

France competed at the 1984 Winter Paralympics in Innsbruck, Austria. 16 competitors (14 men and 2 women) won 6 medals, including 4 gold, 2 silver and 0 bronze. France finished 8th in the medal table.

== Alpine skiing ==
The following athletes representing France in alpine skiing:

- Remy Arnod
- Bernard Baudean
- Jacky Flamand
- Florian Gaude
- Andre Gouin
- Josiane Guichard
- Patrick Knaff
- Virginie Lopez
- Tristan Mouric

The medalists are:

- (gold) Tristan Mouric Men's Downhill LW9
- (gold) Tristan Mouric Men's Slalom LW9
- (silver) Bernard Baudean Men's Downhill LW3
- (silver) Bernard Baudean Men's Giant Slalom LW3

Baudean also competed in the Men's Slalom LW3 event but did not finish.

== Cross-country skiing ==
The following athletes representing France in cross-country skiing:

- Jean-Yves Arvier
- Yves Cibert
- Paul Collet
- Pierre Delaval
- Fernand Perrissin-Faber
- Luc Sabatier
- Gerard Vandel

One athlete won two medals:

- (gold) Pierre Delaval Men's Middle Distance 10 km LW5/7
- (gold) Pierre Delaval Men's Short Distance 5 km LW5/7

Delaval also competed in the Men's 4x5 km Relay LW2-9 and finished in 7th place together with Jean-Yves Arvier, Fernand Perrissin-Faber and Gerard Vandel.

== See also ==
- France at the Paralympics
- France at the 1984 Winter Olympics
