= Alpine skiing at the 1988 Winter Paralympics =

Alpine skiing at the IV Paralympic Winter Games

Former Paralympic symbol (1988-1994)

Alpine skiing at the 1988 Winter Paralympics consisted of 44 events, 29 for men and 15 for women.

== Medal table ==
Rank	Nation	Gold medal	Silver medal	Bronze medal	Total
1	Austria (AUT)	15	4	8	27
2	West Germany (FRG)	7	5	5	17
3	United States (USA)	6	17	5	28
4	Switzerland (SUI)	5	4	5	14
5	France (FRA)	3	4	2	9
6	Italy (ITA)	2	0	4	6
7	Norway (NOR)	2	0	0	2
8	Sweden (SWE)	1	4	2	7
9	Canada (CAN)	1	3	4	8
10	Spain (ESP)	1	0	1	2
11	New Zealand (NZL)	0	1	0	1
12	Poland (POL)	0	0	3	3
13	Japan (JPN)	0	0	2	2
Total		43	42	41	126

== Medal summary ==
The competition events were:

- Downhill: men – women
- Giant slalom: men – women
- Slalom: men – women

Each event had separate standing, sitting, or visually impaired classifications:

- LW2 - standing: single leg amputation above the knee
- LW 3 - standing: double leg amputation below the knee, mild cerebral palsy, or equivalent impairment
- LW4 - standing: single leg amputation below the knee
- LW5/7 - standing: double arm amputation
- LW6/8 - standing: single arm amputation
- LW9 - standing: amputation or equivalent impairment of one arm and one leg
- LW 10 - sitting: paraplegia with no or some upper abdominal function and no functional sitting balance
- B1 - visually impaired: no functional vision
- B2 - visually impaired: up to ca 3-5% functional vision
- B3 - visually impaired: under 10% functional vision

=== Men's events ===
Event	Class	Gold	Silver	Bronze
Downhill	B1	Franz Griessbacher; Austria	Mats Linder; Sweden	Willi Hohm; Austria
Downhill	B2	Odo Habermann; Austria	Stephane Saas; France	Antonio Marziali; Italy
Downhill	B3	Bruno Oberhammer; Italy	Uli Rompel; Canada	Josef Erlacher; Italy
Downhill	LW1	Dan Ashbaugh; United States	Mark Godfrey; United States	Stephen Ellefson; Canada
Downhill	LW2	Fritz Berger; Switzerland	Greg Mannino; United States	Michael Hipp; West Germany
Downhill	LW3	Bernard Baudean; France	Gerhard Langer; Austria	Franciszek Tracz; Poland
Downhill	LW4	Paul Fournier; Switzerland	Hans Burn; Switzerland	Rik Heid; United States
Downhill	LW5/7	Cato Zahl Pedersen; Norway	Kip Roth; United States	Lars Lundstroem; Sweden
Downhill	LW6/8	Markus Pfefferle; West Germany	Paul Neukomm; Switzerland	Meinhard Tatschl; Austria
Downhill	LW9	Eberhard Seischab; West Germany	Tristan Mouric; France	Robert Stroshine; United States
Giant slalom	B1	Franz Griessbacher; Austria	Mats Linder; Sweden	John Houston; Canada
Giant slalom	B2	Odo Habermann; Austria	Stephane Saas; France	Gerhard Pscheider; Austria
Giant slalom	B3	Bruno Oberhammer; Italy	Uli Rompel; Canada	Manfred Perfler; Italy
Giant slalom	LW1	Dan Ashbaugh; United States	Mark Godfrey; United States	Tsutomu Mino; Japan
Giant slalom	LW2	Alexander Spitz; West Germany	Greg Mannino; United States	Rainer Bergmann; Austria
Giant slalom	LW3	Paul Dibello; United States	Bernard Baudean; France	Gerhard Langer; Austria
Giant slalom	LW4	Josef Meusburger; Austria	Markus Ramsauer; Austria	Hans Burn; Switzerland
Giant slalom	LW5/7	Cato Zahl Pedersen; Norway	Lars Lundstroem; Sweden	Matthias Berg; West Germany
Giant slalom	LW6/8	Meinhard Tatschl; Austria	Markus Pfefferle; West Germany	Paul Neukomm; Switzerland
Giant slalom	LW9	Tristan Mouric; France	Eberhard Seischab; West Germany	Robert Stroshine; United States
Giant slalom	LW10	Paul Bluschke; Austria	Jacques Blanc; Switzerland	Hermann Kollau; Switzerland
Slalom	LW1	Dan Ashbaugh; United States	Mark Godfrey; United States	None
Slalom	LW2	Alexander Spitz; West Germany	David Jamison; United States	Michel Duranceau; Canada
Slalom	LW3*	None	None	None
Slalom	LW4	Paul Fournier; Switzerland	Patrick Cooper; New Zealand	Rik Heid; United States
Slalom	LW5/7	Lars Lundstroem; Sweden	Kip Roth; United States	Matthias Berg; West Germany
Slalom	LW6/8	Dietmar Schweninger; Austria	Markus Pfefferle; West Germany	Meinhard Tatschl; Austria
Slalom	LW9	Tristan Mouric; France	Eberhard Seischab; West Germany	Don Garcia; United States
Slalom	LW10	Paul Bluschke; Austria	Jacques Blanc; Switzerland	Peter Wiedemann; West Germany

* In the men's slalom LW3, all four skiers were disqualified

=== Women's events ===
Event	Class	Gold	Silver	Bronze
Downhill	B1	Susana Herrera; Spain	Cara Dunne; United States	Carmela Cantisani; Italy
Downhill	B2	Elisabeth Kellner; Austria	Edith Hoelzl; Austria	Gabriele Berghofer; Austria
Downhill	LW2	Diana Golden; United States	Martha Hill; United States	Annemie Schneider; West Germany
Downhill	LW4	Reinhild Möller; West Germany	Lana Jo Chapin; United States	Lana Spreeman; Canada
Downhill	LW6/8	Martina Altenberger; Austria	Nancy Gustafson; United States	Gunilla Ahren; Sweden
Giant slalom	B1	Elisabeth Maxwald; Austria	Cara Dunne; United States	Susana Herrera; Spain
Giant slalom	B2	Elisabeth Kellner; Austria	Gabriele Berghofer; Austria	Edith Hoelzl; Austria
Giant slalom	LW2	Diana Golden; United States	Annemie Schneider; West Germany	Virginie Lopez; France
Giant slalom	LW4	Reinhild Möller; West Germany	Lana Jo Chapin; United States	Beatrice Berthet; Switzerland
Giant slalom	LW6/8	Martina Altenberger; Austria	Kathy Pitcher; United States	Eszbieta Dadok; Poland
Giant slalom	LW10	Francoise Jacquerod; Switzerland	Marilyn Hamilton; United States	Emiko Ikeda; Japan
Slalom	LW2	Lynda Chyzyk; Canada	Martha Hill; United States	Virginie Lopez; France
Slalom	LW4	Reinhild Möller; West Germany	Lana Spreeman; Canada	Beatrice Berthet; Switzerland
Slalom	LW6/8	Martina Altenberger; Austria	Gunilla Ahren; Sweden	Eszbieta Dadok; Poland
Slalom	LW10	Francoise Jacquerod; Switzerland	None	None

== See also ==
- Alpine skiing at the 1988 Winter Olympics
