= John Davis (skier) =

American para-alpine skier

Sport
- Country: United States
- Sport: Alpine skiing
Medal record
Paralympic Games
Gold medal – first place	1994 Lillehammer	Giant Slalom LWXI
Gold medal – first place	1998 Nagano	Downhill LW11

John Davis is an American para-alpine skier. He represented the United States at the 1994 Winter Paralympics and at the 1998 Winter Paralympics.

In 1994 he won the gold medal in the Men's Giant Slalom LWXI event and in 1998 he won the gold medal in the Men's Downhill LW11 event.

== See also ==
- List of Paralympic medalists in alpine skiing
