= Martina Altenberger =

Austrian Paralympic alpine skier

Personal information
- Born: Niedernsill, Austria

Sport
- Country: Austria
- Sport: Alpine skiing
Medal record
Alpine skiing
Representing Austria
Paralympic Games
Gold medal – first place	1988 Innsbruck	Downhill LW6/8
Gold medal – first place	1988 Innsbruck	Giant slalom LW6/8
Gold medal – first place	1988 Innsbruck	Slalom LW6/8

Martina Altenberger is an Austrian Paralympic alpine skier. She represented Austria in Para-alpine skiing, at the 1988 Paralympic Winter Games in Innsbbruck, winner of three gold medals.

== Career ==
She competed at the 1986 World Disabled Ski Championships.

She competed in the Innsbruck 1988 Winter Paralympics in the LW6 / 8 category, Altenberger won three gold medals: in the giant slalom (with a time of 1: 45.59, besting the American Kathy Pitcher, who won silver in 2: 00.57 and the Polish Eszbieta Dadok, bronze in 2: 06.05, slalom (time 1: 15.63; in 2nd place Gunilla Ahren in 1: 19.09 and in third place Eszbieta Dadok in 1: 37.46), and downhill (race ended in 1: 13.87, ahead of Nancy Gustafson in 1: 14.51 and Gunilla Ahrenin 1: 17.64.

She trained with Skiclub Niedernsill.
