= France at the 1976 Winter Paralympics =

- IPC code: FRA
- NPC: French Paralympic and Sports Committee
- Website: france-paralympique.fr

in Örnsköldsvik
- Competitors: 20 in 2 sports
- Medals Ranked 8th: Gold 2 Silver 0 Bronze 3 Total 5

Winter Paralympics appearances (overview)
- 1976; 1980; 1984; 1988; 1992; 1994; 1998; 2002; 2006; 2010; 2014; 2018; 2022; 2026

France competed at the inaugural Winter Paralympic Games in 1976 in Örnsköldsvik, Sweden. France's twenty athletes took part in both sporting events: cross-country skiing and alpine skiing. With five medals, of which two gold, France finished eighth on the medal table.

== Medallists ==
Medal	Name	Sport	Event
Gold	Bernard Baudean	Alpine skiing	Men's alpine combination IV A
Gold	Bernard Baudean	Alpine skiing	Men's giant slalom IV A
Bronze	Bernard Baudean	Alpine skiing	Men's slalom IV A
Bronze	Remy Arnod	Alpine skiing	Men's alpine combination II
Bronze	Remy Arnod	Alpine skiing	Men's giant slalom II

== Alpine skiing ==
France's alpine skiing team consisted in one woman (Micheline Perrin) and ten men (Remy Arnod, Bernard Baudean, Hubert Dussol, Claude Ebner, Marcel Girod, Patrick Knaff, Louis Loison, André Miegebielle, Pierre Nougaret and Marcel Perrin). All of France's medals were won in alpine skiing. (See above)

== Cross-country skiing ==
France's cross-country skiing team consisted in three women (Catherine Billon, Françoise Billon and Claudette Thomassey) and six men (Guy Bertrand, Raymond Calitka, Robert Dutron, René Pernod, Fernad Perrissin-Faber and Jean Place).

== See also ==
- France at the 1976 Winter Olympics
