= France at the 1988 Winter Paralympics =

- Flag of France
- IPC code: FRA
- NPC: French Paralympic and Sports Committee
- Competitors: 16 (15 men and 1 woman) in 2 sports
- Medals Ranked 7th: Gold 5 Silver 5 Bronze 3 Total 13

Winter Paralympics appearances (overview)
- 1976; 1980; 1984; 1988; 1992; 1994; 1998; 2002; 2006; 2010; 2014; 2018; 2022; 2026

France competed at the 1988 Winter Paralympics in Innsbruck, Austria. 16 competitors (15 men and 1 woman) won 13 medals, including 5 gold, 5 silver and 3 bronze. France finished 7th in the medal table.

France competed in alpine skiing and cross-country skiing.

== Alpine skiing ==
Ten athletes (nine men, one woman) competed in alpine skiing. The medalists are:

- (gold) Bernard Baudean Men's Downhill LW3
- (gold) Tristan Mouric Men's Giant Slalom LW9
- (gold) Tristan Mouric Men's Slalom LW9
- (silver) Bernard Baudean Men's Giant Slalom LW3
- (silver) Tristan Mouric Men's Downhill LW9
- (silver) Stephane Saas Men's Downhill B2
- (silver) Stephane Saas Men's Giant Slalom B2
- (bronze) Virginie Lopez Women's Giant Slalom LW2
- (bronze) Virginie Lopez Women's Slalom LW2

== Cross-country skiing ==
Six athletes (all men) competed in cross-country skiing. The medalists are:

- (gold) Jean-Yves Arvier Men's Long Distance 20 km LW6/8
- (gold) Pierre Delaval Men's Short Distance 5 km LW5/7
- (silver) Pierre Delaval Men's Long Distance 15 km LW5/7
- (bronze) Jean-Yves Arvier Men's Short Distance 10 km LW6/8

== See also ==
- France at the Paralympics
- France at the 1988 Winter Olympics
