= Franz Griessbacher =

Austrian para-alpine skier

Sport
- Country: Austria
- Sport: Para-alpine skiing
Medal record
Paralympic Games
Gold medal – first place	1988 Innsbruck	Downhill B1
Gold medal – first place	1988 Innsbruck	Giant Slalom B1

Franz Griessbacher is an Austrian para-alpine skier. He represented Austria in alpine skiing at the 1988 Winter Paralympics.

He won the gold medal at the Men's Downhill B1 event and also at the Men's Giant Slalom B1 event.

== Achievements ==
Year	Competition	Location	Position	Event	Time
1988	1988 Winter Paralympics	Innsbruck, Austria	1st	Men's Downhill B1	1:10.43
1988	1988 Winter Paralympics	Innsbruck, Austria	1st	Men's Giant Slalom B1	3:04.74

== See also ==
- List of Paralympic medalists in alpine skiing
