= France at the 2002 Winter Paralympics =

- IPC code: FRA
- NPC: French Paralympic and Sports Committee
- Website: france-paralympique.fr

in Salt Lake City
- Competitors: 18
- Medals Ranked 13th: Gold 2 Silver 11 Bronze 6 Total 19

Winter Paralympics appearances (overview)
- 1976; 1980; 1984; 1988; 1992; 1994; 1998; 2002; 2006; 2010; 2014; 2018; 2022; 2026

France competed at the 2002 Winter Paralympics in Salt Lake City, United States. 18 competitors from France won 19 medals, including 2 gold, 11 silver and 6 bronze and finished 13th in the medal table.

== See also ==
- France at the Paralympics
- France at the 2002 Winter Olympics
