= Michel Duranceau =

Canadian para-alpine skier

Sport
- Country: Canada
- Sport: Para-alpine skiing
Medal record
Paralympic Games
Bronze medal – third place	1988 Innsbruck	Slalom LW2

Michel Duranceau is a Canadian para-alpine skier. He represented Canada at the 1988 Winter Paralympics.

He competed in the Men's Downhill LW2, Men's Giant Slalom LW2 and Men's Slalom LW2 events. He won the bronze medal in the Men's Slalom LW2 event.

== See also ==
- List of Paralympic medalists in alpine skiing
