= Adrienne Rivera =

American para-alpine skier

Sport
- Country: United States
- Sport: Alpine skiing
Medal record
Paralympic Games
Gold medal – first place	1994 Lillehammer	Giant Slalom LW2
Bronze medal – third place	1994 Lillehammer	Super-G LW2

Adrienne Rivera is an American para-alpine skier. She represented the United States at the 1994 Winter Paralympics in four events in alpine skiing.

She was diagnosed with bone cancer and as a result lost a leg at the age of 14. Following her career in sports she became an aerospace engineer.

She won the gold medal in the Women's Giant Slalom LW2 event and the bronze medal in the Women's Super-G LW2 event.

She also competed in the Women's Downhill LW2 event and the Women's Slalom LW2 event but did not win a medal.

== See also ==
- List of Paralympic medalists in alpine skiing
