= France at the 1980 Winter Paralympics =

- IPC code: FRA
- NPC: French Paralympic and Sports Committee
- Website: france-paralympique.fr
- Competitors: 21 (19 men and 2 women) in 3 sports
- Medals Ranked 9th: Gold 1 Silver 1 Bronze 1 Total 3

Winter Paralympics appearances (overview)
- 1976; 1980; 1984; 1988; 1992; 1994; 1998; 2002; 2006; 2010; 2014; 2018; 2022; 2026

France competed at the 1980 Winter Paralympics in Geilo, Norway. 21 competitors (19 men and 2 women) won 3 medals, including 1 gold, 1 silver and 1 bronze. France finished 9th in the medal table.

== Alpine skiing ==
The medalists are:

- (gold) Bernard Baudean Men's Giant Slalom 2B
- (bronze) Remy Arnod Men's Slalom 2A

== Cross-country skiing ==
The medalists are:

- (silver) Gerard Vandel Men's Short Distance 5 km 2A

== Ice sledge speed racing ==
Two athletes (Claude Ebner and Aime Planchon) represented France in ice sledge speed racing at the 1980 Winter Paralympics. No medals were won.

== See also ==
- France at the Paralympics
- France at the 1980 Summer Paralympics
