= Gunilla Ahren =

Swedish para-alpine skier

Personal information
- Born: 1 October 1961 (age 64)

Sport
- Country: Sweden
- Sport: Para-alpine skiing
Medal record
Winter Paralympics
Gold medal – first place	1984 Innsbruck	Downhill LW6/8
Gold medal – first place	1984 Innsbruck	Giant slalom LW6/8
Gold medal – first place	1984 Innsbruck	Slalom LW6/8
Gold medal – first place	1984 Innsbruck	Alpine combination LW6/8
Silver medal – second place	1988 Innsbruck	Slalom LW6/8
Bronze medal – third place	1988 Innsbruck	Downhill LW6/8

Gunilla Ahren (born 1 October 1961) is a retired Swedish para-alpine skier. She represented her country in Paralympic alpine skiing at the 1984 Paralympic Winter Games and 1988 Paralympic Winter Games, both held in Innsbruck, Austria, winning six medals: four golds, one silver and one bronze.

== Career ==
Ahren competed in the 1984 Winter Paralympics in the LW6/8 category. She had won four gold medals: in the slalom (with a time of 1:16.04), in the giant slalom (with a time of 1:28.68), downhill (with a time of 1:09.20), and in the Alpine super combined.

Ahren competed in the 1988 Winter Paralympics, She had won the silver medal in the slalom race (gold for Martina Altenberger in 1:15.63 and bronze for Eszbieta Dadok in 1:37.46), and the bronze medal in the downhill in 1:17.64 (on the podium in front of her, Martina Altenberger with 1:13.87 and Nancy Gustafson in 1:14.51). Additionally, she competed in the giant slalom.

Ahren also competed in the 1990 World Paralympic Championships.

== See also ==
- List of Paralympic medalists in alpine skiing
