= Hans Burn =

Swiss para-alpine skier

Sport
- Country: Switzerland
- Sport: Para-alpine skiing
Medal record
Paralympic Games
Bronze medal – third place	1988 Innsbruck	Giant Slalom LW4
Silver medal – second place	1988 Innsbruck	Downhill LW4
Bronze medal – third place	1992 Albertville	Super-G LW4
Gold medal – first place	1992 Albertville	Giant Slalom LW4
Gold medal – first place	1992 Albertville	Downhill LW4
Bronze medal – third place	1994 Lillehammer	Super-G LW4
Silver medal – second place	1994 Lillehammer	Downhill LW4
Gold medal – first place	1998 Nagano	Slalom LW4
Silver medal – second place	1998 Nagano	Super-G LW4
Gold medal – first place	1998 Nagano	Giant Slalom LW4
Gold medal – first place	1998 Nagano	Downhill LW4
Silver medal – second place	2002 Salt Lake City	Slalom LW4
Silver medal – second place	2002 Salt Lake City	Giant Slalom LW4
Gold medal – first place	2002 Salt Lake City	Downhill LW4

Hans Burn is a Swiss para-alpine skier. He represented Switzerland at the Winter Paralympics in 1988, 1992, 1994, 1998, 2002 and 2006. In total he won six gold medals, five silver medals and three bronze medals.

== Achievements ==
Year	Competition	Location	Position	Event	Time
1988	1988 Winter Paralympics	Innsbruck, Austria	3rd	Giant Slalom LW4	1:45.46
1988	1988 Winter Paralympics	Innsbruck, Austria	2nd	Downhill LW4	1:13.20

== See also ==
- List of Paralympic medalists in alpine skiing
