= France at the 1998 Winter Paralympics =

- IPC code: FRA
- NPC: French Paralympic and Sports Committee
- Website: france-paralympique.fr

in Nagano
- Competitors: 25
- Medals Ranked 10th: Gold 5 Silver 9 Bronze 8 Total 22

Winter Paralympics appearances (overview)
- 1976; 1980; 1984; 1988; 1992; 1994; 1998; 2002; 2006; 2010; 2014; 2018; 2022; 2026

France competed at the 1998 Winter Paralympics in Nagano, Japan. 25 competitors from France won 22 medals, including 5 gold, 9 silver and 8 bronze and finished 10th in the medal table.

== See also ==
- France at the Paralympics
- France at the 1998 Winter Olympics
