= France at the 2010 Winter Paralympics =

- IPC code: FRA
- NPC: French Paralympic and Sports Committee
- Website: france-paralympique.fr

in Vancouver
- Competitors: 21 in 3 sports
- Flag bearer: Romain Riboud
- Medals Ranked 10th: Gold 1 Silver 4 Bronze 1 Total 6

Winter Paralympics appearances (overview)
- 1976; 1980; 1984; 1988; 1992; 1994; 1998; 2002; 2006; 2010; 2014; 2018; 2022; 2026

France sent a delegation to compete at the 2010 Winter Paralympics in Vancouver, British Columbia, Canada. The country fielded seven athletes in cross-country skiing and biathlon, and fourteen in alpine skiing. The team’s flagbearer was alpine skier Romain Riboud.

On March 20, following France's third and fourth medals of the game, commentators on France Télévisions (the Games' broadcasters in France) noted that French Paralympians were not professionals (holding jobs, and training only during their spare time), and did not benefit from the same level of funding and support as athletes from certain more successful countries. They suggested that France might have to rethink the level of support it provided to its Winter Paralympians before the 2014 Winter Games in Sochi.

== Alpine skiing ==
France’s alpine skiing team consisted of three women (Marie Bochet, Solène Jambaqué and Nathalie Tyack) and eleven men (Vincent Gauthier-Manuel, Lionel Brun, Jean-Yves Le Meur, Nicolas Loussalez, Romain Ribout, Yohann Taberlet, Cyril Moré, Nicolas Béréjny, Cédric Amafroi-Broisat, Laurent Caul-Futy and Anthony Chalençon). France won all of its medals in this event. The medalists are:

- (gold) Nicolas Béréjny Men's Super-G, visually impaired
- (silver) Solène Jambaqué Women's Super Combined, standing
- (silver) Solène Jambaqué Women's Downhill, standing
- (silver) Vincent Gauthier-Manuel Men's Super Combined, standing
- (silver) Vincent Gauthier-Manuel Men's Super-G, standing
- (bronze) Vincent Gauthier-Manuel Men's Giant Slalom, standing

== Biathlon ==
France’s biathlon team consisted of one woman (Nathalie Morin) and five men (Yannick Bourseaux, Thomas Clarion, Georges Bettega, Romain Rosique and Thierry Raoux).

== Cross-country skiing ==
France’s cross-country skiing team consisted of seven athletes: the same six as in biathlon, plus Alain Marguerettaz.

== See also ==
- France at the 2010 Winter Olympics
