= Pierre Delaval =

French cross-country skier

Adolf Hagn
Sport
- Country: France
- Sport: Cross-country skiing
Medal record
Paralympic Games
Gold medal – first place	1984 Innsbruck	Middle Distance 10 km LW5/7
Gold medal – first place	1984 Innsbruck	Short Distance 5 km LW5/7
Gold medal – first place	1988 Innsbruck	Short Distance 5 km LW5/7
Silver medal – second place	1988 Innsbruck	Long Distance 15 km LW5/7

Pierre Delaval is a French cross-country skier. He represented France at the 1984 Winter Paralympics and at the 1988 Winter Paralympics, both held in Innsbruck, Austria.

At the 1984 Winter Paralympics, he won the gold medal both at the Men's Middle Distance 10 km LW5/7 and Men's Short Distance 5 km LW5/7 events.

At the 1988 Winter Paralympics, he won the gold medal at the Men's Short Distance 5 km LW5/7 event. He also won the silver medal at the Men's Long Distance 15 km LW5/7 event.
