= France at the 1994 Winter Paralympics =

- IPC code: FRA
- NPC: French Paralympic and Sports Committee
- Website: france-paralympique.fr

in Lillehammer
- Competitors: 26
- Medals Ranked 4th: Gold 14 Silver 6 Bronze 11 Total 31

Winter Paralympics appearances (overview)
- 1976; 1980; 1984; 1988; 1992; 1994; 1998; 2002; 2006; 2010; 2014; 2018; 2022; 2026

France competed at the 1994 Winter Paralympics in Lillehammer, Norway. 26 competitors from France won 31 medals including 14 gold, 6 silver and 11 bronze, and finished 4th in the medal table.

== See also ==
- France at the Paralympics
- France at the 1994 Winter Olympics
