= Martin Braxenthaler =

German para-alpine skier (born 1972)

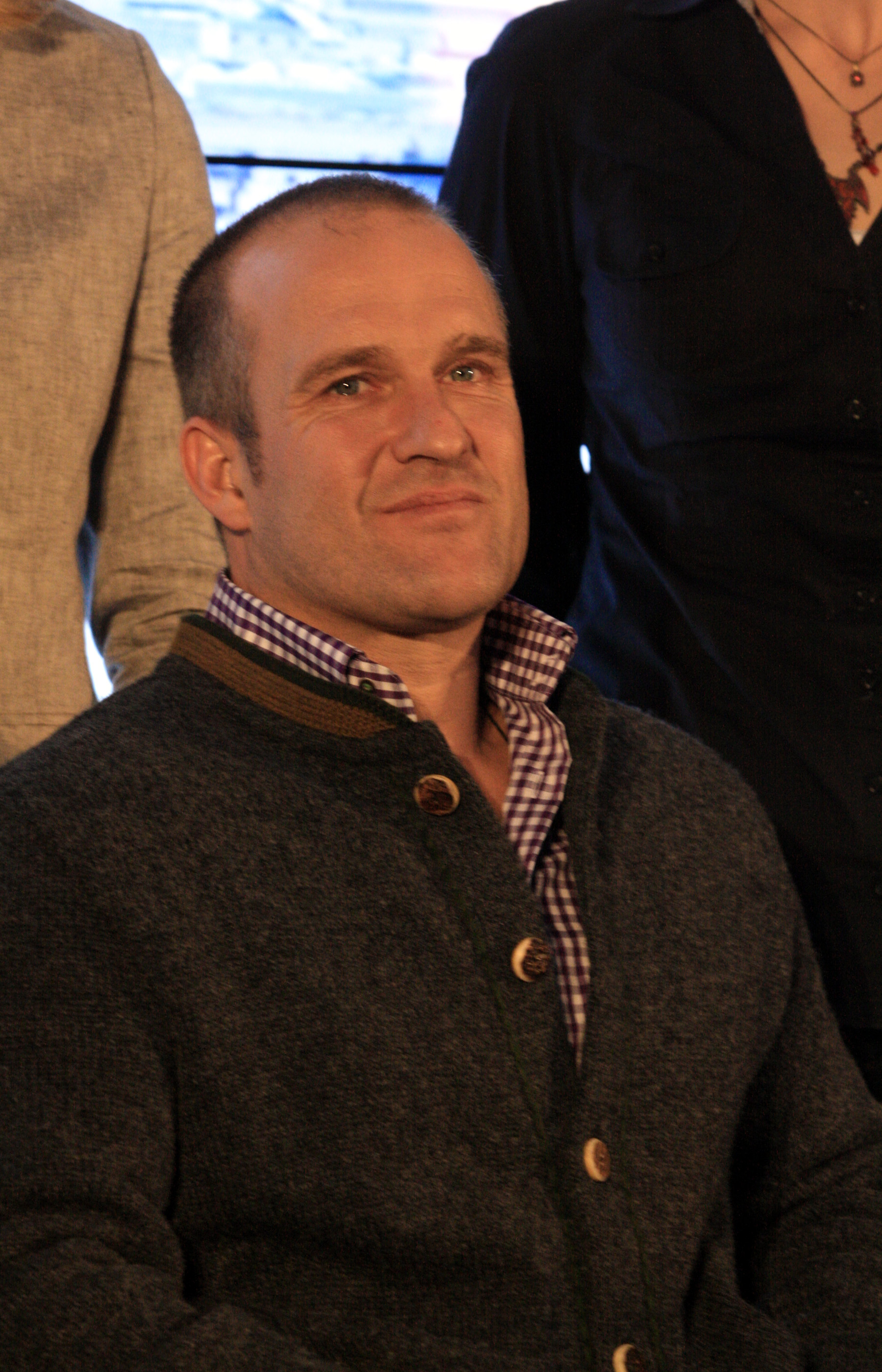
- a German monoskier and Paralympian

Personal information
- Nationality: German
- Born: 11 March 1972 (age 54) Traunstein, West Germany
- Years active: 1996–2011

Sport
- Country: Germany
- Sport: Para-alpine skiing
- Disability class: LW10
- Event(s): Downhill slalom Giant slalom Super combined Super-G
Medal record
Men's para-alpine skiing
Representing Germany
Winter Paralympics
| Gold medal – first place | 2002 Salt Lake City | Downhill |
| Gold medal – first place | 2002 Salt Lake City | Giant slalom |
| Gold medal – first place | 2002 Salt Lake City | Slalom |
| Gold medal – first place | 2002 Salt Lake City | Super-G |
| Gold medal – first place | 2006 Turin | Giant slalom |
| Gold medal – first place | 2006 Turin | Slalom |
| Gold medal – first place | 2006 Turin | Super-G |
| Gold medal – first place | 2010 Vancouver | Combined |
| Gold medal – first place | 2010 Vancouver | Giant slalom |
| Gold medal – first place | 2010 Vancouver | slalom |
| Silver medal – second place | 2010 Vancouver | Super-G |
| Bronze medal – third place | 1998 Nagano | Super-G |
IPC Alpine Skiing World Championships
| Gold medal – first place | 2004 Wildschönau | Giant slalom |
| Gold medal – first place | 2004 Wildschönau | Slalom |
| Silver medal – second place | 2004 Wildschönau | Super-G |

Martin Braxenthaler (born 11 March 1972) is a German monoskier and Paralympian. He has participated in alpine skiing at four Winter Paralympic Games, in 1998, 2002, 2006 and 2010. He won a bronze medal at the 1998 Winter Paralympics, four golds at the 2002 Games, three more golds at the 2006 Torino Paralympics and three golds and one silver at the 2010 Vancouver Paralympics.

In 2007 he was named the Laureus World Sports Award for Sportsperson with a Disability of the Year and won the Sitting element of the IPC Disabled Alpine World Cup. At the 2010 Winter Paralympics, Braxenthaler won three gold, as well as one silver medal.

When asked about being "the most successful mono-skier in the history of the Paralympic movement", Braxenthaler replied:

Great success is often just measured by the colour of the medal. From this perspective, I guess I could be considered the most successful athlete. But success is about more than just medals, and so to being the most successful athlete overall- that's for others to decide.

== Sources ==
- www.newdisability.com
