= Don Garcia (skier) =

American para-alpine skier

Sport
- Country: United States
- Sport: Alpine skiing
Medal record
Paralympic Games
Bronze medal – third place	1988 Innsbruck	Slalom LW9

Don Garcia is an American para-alpine skier. He represented the United States at the 1988 Winter Paralympics in alpine skiing.

He won the bronze medal in the Men's Slalom LW9 event at the 1988 Winter Paralympics.

He also competed at the Men's Downhill LW9 event and the Men's Giant Slalom LW9 but did not win a medal.
