= Robert Stroshine =

American para-alpine skier

Sport
- Country: United States
- Sport: Alpine skiing
Medal record
Paralympic Games
| Bronze medal – third place | 1988 Innsbruck | Downhill LW9 |
| Bronze medal – third place | 1988 Innsbruck | Giant Slalom LW9 |

Robert Stroshine is an American para-alpine skier. He represented the United States at the 1988 Winter Paralympics in alpine skiing.

He won the bronze medal in the Men's Downhill LW9 event and the bronze medal in the Men's Giant Slalom LW9 event.

He also competed in the Men's Slalom LW9 event and finished in 4th place.
