= Elisabeth Dos-Kellner =

Austrian Paralympic alpine skier

Personal information
- Born: 16 January 1966 (age 60)

Sport
- Country: Austria
- Sport: Alpine skiing
- Disability class: B2
Medal record
Alpine skiing
Representing Austria
Paralympic Games
Gold medal – first place	1988 Innsbruck	Downhill B2
Gold medal – first place	1988 Innsbruck	Giant slalom B2
Gold medal – first place	1992 Albertville	Giant slalom B1-3
Gold medal – first place	1992 Albertville	Super-G B1-3
Gold medal – first place	1994 Lillehammer	Giant slalom B1-2
Silver medal – second place	1994 Lillehammer	Super-G B1-2
Bronze medal – third place	1998 Nagano	Giant slalom B2
Bronze medal – third place	1998 Nagano	Super-G B2

Elisabeth Dos-Kellner (born 16 January 1966) is an Austrian Paralympic alpine skier. She represented Austria in Para-alpine skiing at the 1988 Paralympic Winter Games, and 1994 Paralympic Winter Games. She won four medals: three gold medals and a silver medal.

== Career ==
She competed at the 1988 Winter Paralympics in Innsbruck, in the B2 category, Kellner won two gold medals: in giant slalom (with a time of 1:58.27), and downhill (race ended in 0:53.24).

She competed at the 1994 Winter Paralympics in Lillehammer, Norway. She took gold in the giant slalom B1-2 race (achieved time of 2:50.31), and silver in alpine super combined B1-2, in 1:18.89 (on the podium, gold for Gabriele Huemer in 1:18.89 and bronze for Joanne Duffy in 1:27.74).
