= Steven Bayley =

New Zealand para-alpine skier (born 1971)

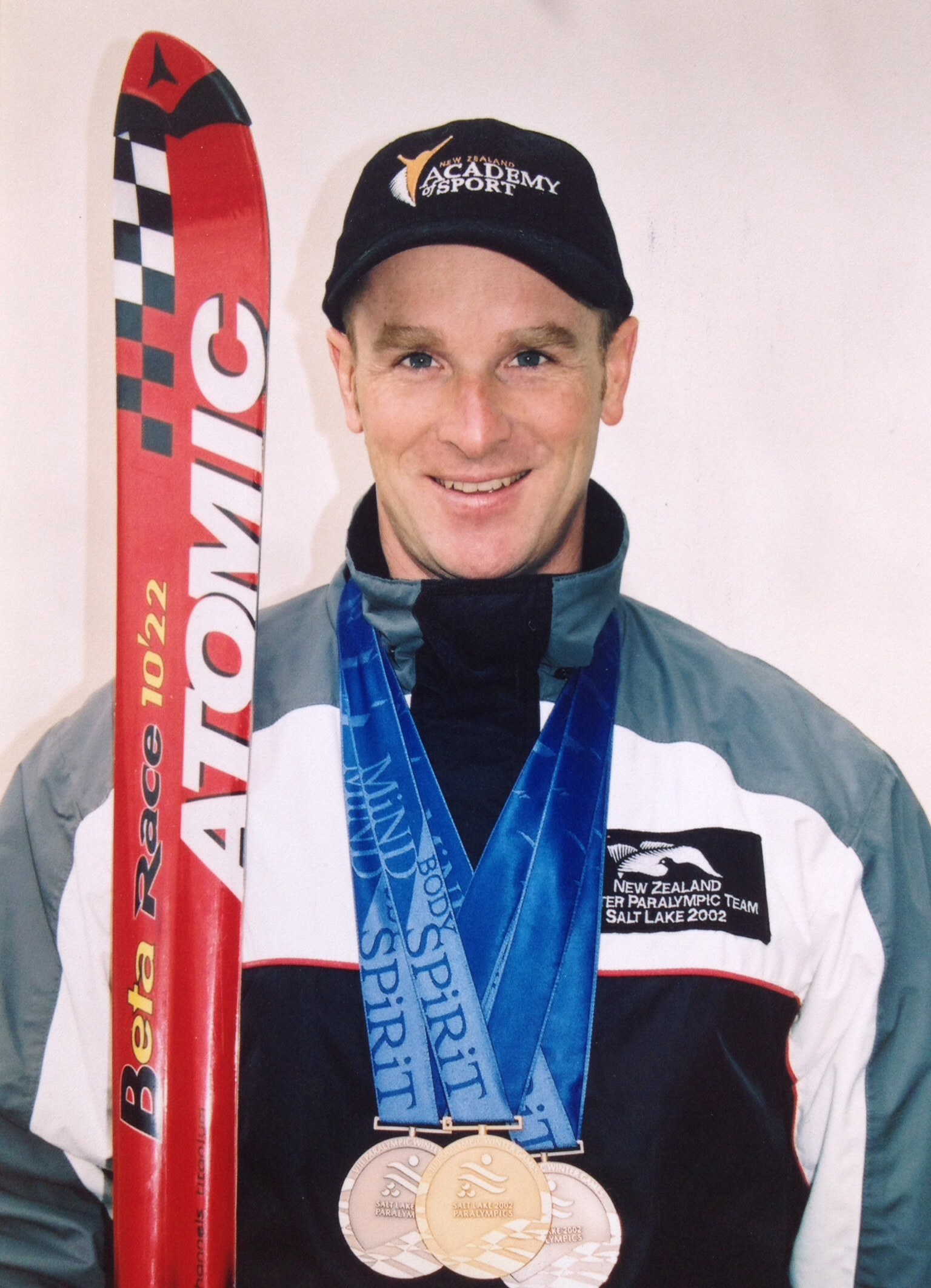
- Bayley wearing his three medals from the 2002 Winter Paralympics

Personal information
- Nationality: New Zealand
- Born: 9 June 1971 (age 55) Christchurch, New Zealand
- Height: 180 cm (5 ft 11 in)
Medal record
Men's alpine skiing
Representing New Zealand
Paralympic Games
Gold medal – first place	2002 Salt Lake City	Giant Slalom
Bronze medal – third place	1998 Nagano	Giant Slalom
Bronze medal – third place	2002 Salt Lake City	Downhill
Bronze medal – third place	2002 Salt Lake City	Super-G

Steven Patrick Bayley (born 9 June 1971) is a Paralympic medalist from New Zealand who competed in alpine skiing. He competed in the 1998 Winter Paralympics where he won a bronze medal in Giant Slalom. He also competed in the 2002 Winter Paralympics in Salt Lake City where he won a bronze medal in the Downhill and Super G and a gold medal in the Giant Slalom.
