= Magda Amo =

Spanish ski athlete (born 1973)

Personal information
- Full name: Magda Amo Rius
- Born: 23 July 1973 (age 52) Barcelona, Spain

Sport
- Country: Spain
- Sport: Alpine skiing
- Disability: blind
- Disability class: B2 type skier
Medal record
Alpine skiing
Representing Spain
Paralympic Games
Bronze medal – third place	1992 Winter Paralympics	Giant slalom
Silver medal – second place	1994 Winter Paralympics	Downhill
Gold medal – first place	1998 Winter Paralympics	Giant, Super Giant, Slalom and Downhill

Magda Amo Rius (born July 23, 1973, in Barcelona) is a track and field athlete and a ski athlete from Spain. She is blind. She is a B2 type skier. She competed at the 1992 Winter Paralympics, winning a bronze in the giant slalom race. She raced at the 1994 Winter Paralympics, earning a silver in the downhill race. She jumped at the 1996 Summer Paralympics. She jumped the farthest in the long jump. She skied at the 1998 Winter Paralympics and won a gold in the Giant, Super Giant, Slalom and Downhill races.
