= Eszbieta Dadok =

Polish para-alpine skier

Sport
- Country: Polish
- Sport: Para-alpine skiing
Medal record
Winter Paralympics
Bronze medal – third place	1984 Innsbruck	Slalom LW6/8
Bronze medal – third place	1984 Innsbruck	Alpine combination LW6/8
Bronze medal – third place	1984 Innsbruck	Giant slalom LW6/8
Bronze medal – third place	1988 Innsbruck	Downhill LW3
Bronze medal – third place	1988 Innsbruck	Slalom LW6/8
Bronze medal – third place	1988 Innsbruck	Giant slalom LW6/8

Eszbieta Dadok is a retired Polish para-alpine skier. She represented her country in Paralympic alpine skiing at the 1984 Paralympic Winter Games and 1988 Paralympic Winter Games, both held in Innsbruck, Austria, winning six bronze medals.

== Career ==
At the 1984 Winter Paralympics in Innsbruck, Dadok finished in third place in the slalom in 1:22.81 (with gold medalist Gunilla Ahren finishing in 1:16.04 and silver medalist Kathy Poohachof in 1:17.04), in the alpine super combined (with 3:47.19, Dadok again placed third, behind Gunilla Ahren and Kathy Poohachof) and giant slalom, and then finished in fourth place in the downhill. All races were held in the LW6/8 category. She won a further bronze medal in the LW3 slalom.

Four years later, at the 1988 Winter Paralympics, Dadok placed 3rd in the slalom and giant slalom and 5th in the downhill.

Dadok also competed at the 1992 Winter Paralympics in Albertville, in the LW5/7,6/8 category, where she finished in 4th in the super-G, 5th in the slalom, and 6th in both the giant slalom and downhill races.

== See also ==
- List of Paralympic medalists in alpine skiing
