= Kip Roth =

American para-alpine skier

Sport
- Country: United States
- Sport: Alpine skiing
Medal record
Paralympic Games
Silver medal – second place	1988 Innsbruck	Downhill LW5/7
Silver medal – second place	1988 Innsbruck	Slalom LW5/7

Kip Roth is an American para-alpine skier. He represented the United States at the 1988 Winter Paralympics in alpine skiing.

He won the silver medal in the Men's Downhill LW5/7 event and also in the Men's Slalom LW5/7 event.

He also competed in the Men's Giant Slalom LW5/7 event but was disqualified.
