= Patrick Cooper =

New Zealand para-alpine skier (born 1968)

Personal information
- Nationality: New Zealand
- Born: 1968 (age 57–58)
Medal record
Men's para alpine skiing
Representing New Zealand
Paralympic Games
Gold medal – first place	1992 Tignes/Albertville	Slalom LW4
Gold medal – first place	1992 Tignes/Albertville	Super-G LW4
Gold medal – first place	1994 Lillehammer	Slalom LW4
Gold medal – first place	1994 Lillehammer	Super-G LW4
Silver medal – second place	1988 Innsbruck	Slalom LW4
Bronze medal – third place	1994 Lillehammer	Giant Slalom LW4

Patrick Cooper (born 1968) is a winter Paralympian from New Zealand who competed in the Paralympic Winter Games in 1988, 1992 and 1994 in the para alpine skiing.

== Career ==
Cooper made his first appearance at the Winter Games in Innsbruck 1988. He competed in the Men's Slalom LW4 event where he won a silver medal.

In his second Winter Game, the Albertville 1992 Paralympic Winter Games, he won 2 gold medals for New Zealand from the Men's Slalom LW4 and Super-G LW4 event.

In Lillehammer 1994 Paralympic Winter Games, Cooper managed to grab 3 medals for his country, gold in Men's Slalom LW4 and Men's Super-G LW4 and a bronze medal in the Men's Giant Slalom LW4 event.
