= France at the 1992 Winter Paralympics =

- IPC code: FRA
- NPC: French Paralympic and Sports Committee
- Website: france-paralympique.fr

in Tignes-Albertville
- Competitors: 31 in 3 sports
- Medals Ranked 6th: Gold 6 Silver 4 Bronze 9 Total 19

Winter Paralympics appearances (overview)
- 1976; 1980; 1984; 1988; 1992; 1994; 1998; 2002; 2006; 2010; 2014; 2018; 2022; 2026

France was the host country of the 1992 Winter Paralympics in Tignes-Albertville. The country's delegation was the joint second largest at the Games, consisting in 31 competitors (28 men and 3 women) in all three sports: alpine skiing, biathlon and cross-country skiing.

French athletes won a total of six gold medals, four silver, and nine bronze, placing it sixth on the medal table. France's gold medallists were:

- Lionel Brun in the Men's giant slalom LW6/8, with a real time of 2:12.92.
- Lionel Brun in the Men's slalom LW6/8, with a real time of 1:16.42.
- Stephane Saas in the Men's giant slalom B2, with a real time of 2:36.14.
- Stephane Saas in the Men's super-G B2, with a real time of 1:28.32.
- Jean-Yves Arvier in the Men's short distance 5 km LW6/8 with a real time of 16:12.7.
- André Favre in the Men's long distance 20 km LW2,4 with a real time of 53:15.8.

== See also ==
- France at the 1992 Winter Olympics
