= Brian Santos =

American para-alpine skier

Sport
- Country: United States
- Sport: Para-alpine skiing
- Retired: 1996
Medal record
Paralympic Games
Alpine Skiing
| Gold medal – first place | Albertville 1992 | Men's Giant Slalom B3 |
| Gold medal – first place | Albertville 1992 | Men's Super-G B3 |
| Gold medal – first place | Lillehammer 1994 | Men's Giant Slalom B3 |
| Gold medal – first place | Lillehammer 1994 | Men's Super-G B3 |
| Gold medal – first place | Lillehammer 1994 | Men's Slalom B3 |
| Gold medal – first place | Lillehammer 1994 | Men's Downhill B3 |

Brian Santos is an American skier who won nine U.S. Championships and six Paralympic gold medals. Santos won all six para-alpine skiing events in which he competed across Albertville in the 1992 Winter Paralympics and Lillehammer in the 1994 Winter Paralympics. In each event his guide was Ray Watkins. Santos and Watkins were inducted into the National Disabled Ski Hall of Fame in December 2015, making Santos the first visually-impaired racer to be given the honor and Watkins the first guide. Santos retired from competitive skiing in 1996 and later became a coach at the College of the Siskiyous

== Biography ==
Santos, a resident of Mount Shasta, California, competed in the B3 category for people with under 10% functional vision. Born with a misshapen right eye, Santos could see through his left eye without problem until an accident in 1981 led to it being struck by a golf ball. He lost the eye and had to rely on his near-sighted right eye with a contact lens. After the accident it was his brother who gave him the motivation to ski.

Santos competed in the B2 events at Innsbruck in the 1984 Winter Paralympics but failed to win a medal. He was listed as a competitor for the Men's Downhill B3 in the 1988 Winter Paralympics but was unable to start. His real Paralympic successes came in Albertville in 1992 when he won gold in the Men's Giant Slalom B3 and Men's Super-G B3, the only B3 events that took place in alpine skiing. He returned two years later to the 1994 Games in Lillehammer, winning all four events in the expanded B3 program: giant slalom, super-G, slalom, and downhill. In 1995, Skiing magazine described him as "the dominant blind skier in the world".

During his Paralympic campaigns, Santos continued to work as an arborist before taking up a coaching role.
