= Jeremy Babcock =

American para-alpine skier

Sport
- Country: United States
- Sport: Alpine skiing
Medal record
Paralympic Games
Silver medal – second place	1994 Lillehammer	Slalom LW6/8

Jeremy Babcock is an American para-alpine skier. He represented the United States at the 1994 Winter Paralympics in alpine skiing.

He won the silver medal at the Men's Slalom LW6/8 event.
