= Chris Waddell =

American Paralympic athlete

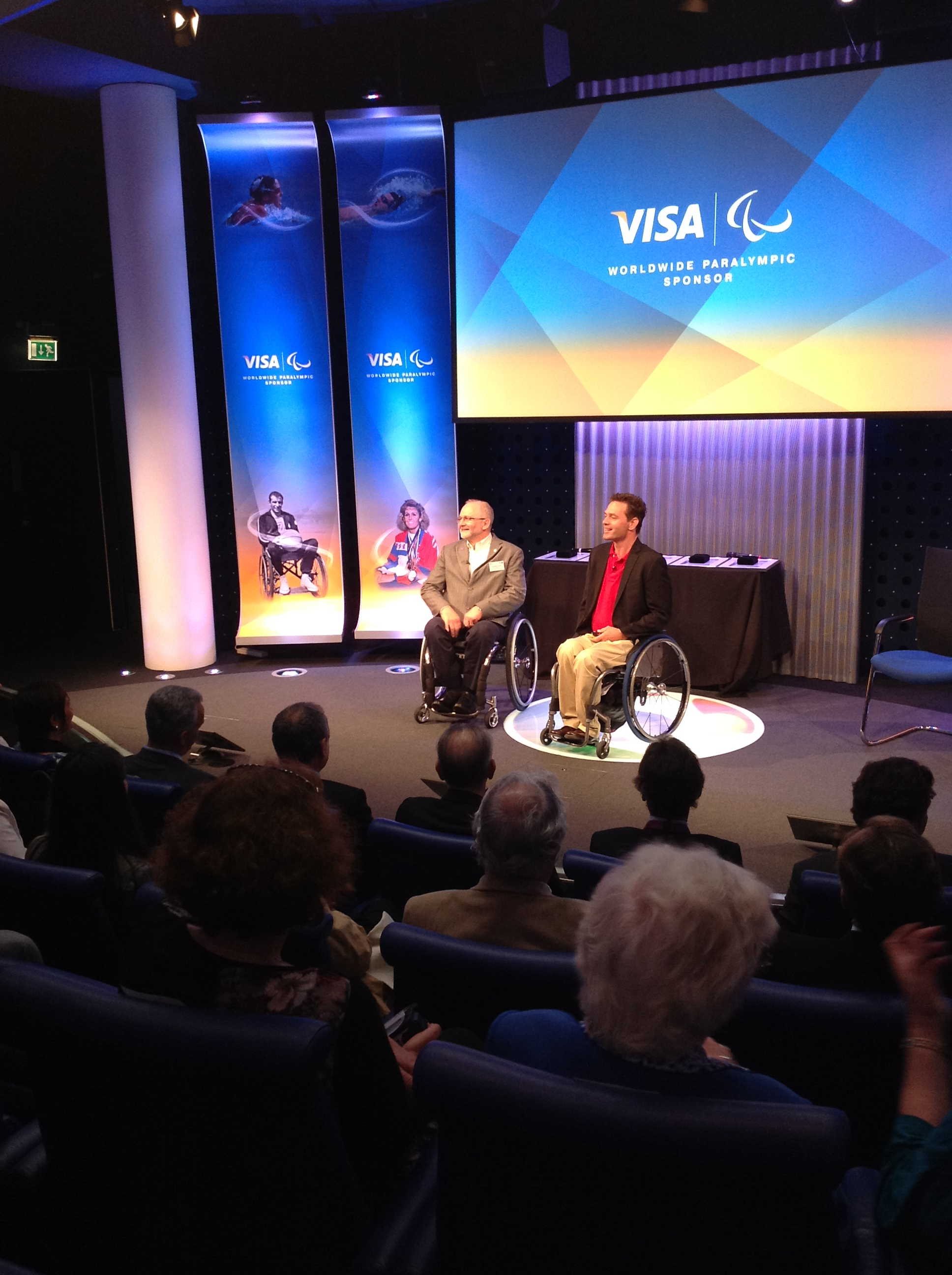
- Chris Waddell at the Visa hall of Fame induction ceremony in London, August 2012

Personal information
- Full name: Christopher Waddell
- Nationality: United States
- Born: September 28, 1968 (age 57) Eaglebrook, Mass.
- Home town: Park City, Utah
Medal record
Representing United States
Paralympic Alpine Skiing
Paralympic Games
| Silver medal – second place | 1992 Albertville | Men's Giant Slalom LW10 |
| Silver medal – second place | 1992 Albertville | Men's Slalom LW10 |
| Gold medal – first place | 1994 Lillehammer | Men's Downhill LWX |
| Gold medal – first place | 1994 Lillehammer | Men's Giant Slalom LWX |
| Gold medal – first place | 1994 Lillehammer | Men's Slalom LWX |
| Gold medal – first place | 1994 Lillehammer | Men's Super-G LWX |
| Gold medal – first place | 1998 Nagano | Men's Downhill LW10 |
| Silver medal – second place | 1998 Nagano | Men's Slalom LW10 |
| Silver medal – second place | 1998 Nagano | Men's Super-G LW10 |
| Silver medal – second place | 2002 Salt Lake | Men's Downhill LW10 |
| Bronze medal – third place | 2002 Salt Lake | Men's Giant Slalom LW10 |
| Bronze medal – third place | 2002 Salt Lake | Men's Slalom LW10 |
Paralympic Athletics
Paralympic Games
| Silver medal – second place | 2000 Sydney | Men's 200 m T53 |

Chris Waddell (born September 28, 1968) is an American Paralympic sit-skier and wheelchair track athlete. He is also an NBC Sports TV host. He was a promising non-disabled skier while attending Middlebury College in Vermont, before a skiing accident left him paralysed from the waist down.

As a sit-skier, Waddell won medals in the 1992, 1994, 1998 and 2002 Winter Paralympics. As a wheelchair track racer, he represented the US at the 1996, 2000 and 2004 Summer Paralympics. He won a silver medal in the 200m T53 event at the Sydney Paralympic Games. In 2004, he set a T53 world record time for this distance, which still stands.

In 2006, Waddell was inducted into the National Disabled Ski Hall of Fame by Disabled Sports USA. In 2010, he was inducted into the Paralympic Hall of Fame.

On September 30, 2009, Waddell became the first paraplegic to climb Mount Kilimanjaro. On May 5, 2010, he was named the 2010 Shining Star of Perseverance Honoree by the WillReturn Council of Assurant Employee Benefits to honor and recognize individuals and groups who overcome disabilities to succeed in the workplace and society.

Currently, Wadell has a foundation called One Revolution, which is dedicated to seeing the world positively, by the use of "Nametags" that define oneself.
