= Tristan Mouric =

French Paralympic athlete

Sport
- Country: France
- Sport: Cycling; Para-alpine skiing
Medal record
Paralympic Games
Gold medal – first place	1984 Innsbruck	Slalom LW9
Gold medal – first place	1984 Innsbruck	Downhill LW9
Gold medal – first place	1988 Seoul	Road 50 km LC2
Gold medal – first place	1988 Innsbruck	Slalom LW9
Gold medal – first place	1988 Innsbruck	Giant Slalom LW9
Silver medal – second place	1988 Innsbruck	Downhill LW9
Bronze medal – third place	1992 Albertville	Slalom LW1,3,5/7,9
Silver medal – second place	1994 Lillehammer	Slalom LW9
Gold medal – first place	1994 Lillehammer	Super-G LW9
Silver medal – second place	1994 Lillehammer	Giant Slalom LW9
Gold medal – first place	1994 Lillehammer	Downhill LW9

Tristan Mouric is a French Paralympic athlete who competed both at the Summer and Winter Paralympics. In total, he won seven gold medals, three silver medals and one bronze medal.

Mouric first competed at the 1984 Winter Paralympics in alpine skiing. He also represented France in alpine skiing at the Winter Paralympics in 1988, 1992, 1994 and 1998.

Mouric also represented France at the 1988 Summer Paralympics and at the 1992 Summer Paralympics in cycling. In 1988 he won the gold medal in the Men's Road 50 km LC2 event.

== Achievements ==
=== Cycling ===
Year	Competition	Location	Position	Event	Time
1988	1988 Summer Paralympics	Seoul, South Korea	1st	Men's Road 50 km LC2	1:28:03

=== Alpine skiing ===
Year	Competition	Location	Position	Event	Time
1984	1984 Winter Paralympics	Innsbruck, Austria	1st	Men's Slalom LW9	1:33.41
1984	1984 Winter Paralympics	Innsbruck, Austria	1st	Men's Downhill LW9	1:15.28
1988	1988 Winter Paralympics	Innsbruck, Austria	1st	Men's Slalom LW9	1:25.45
1988	1988 Winter Paralympics	Innsbruck, Austria	1st	Men's Giant Slalom LW9	1:55.49
1988	1988 Winter Paralympics	Innsbruck, Austria	2nd	Men's Downhill LW9	1:21.03
1992	1992 Winter Paralympics	Tignes / Albertville, France	3rd	Men's Slalom LW1,3,5/7,9	1:26.76
1994	1994 Winter Paralympics	Lillehammer, Norway	2nd	Men's Slalom LW9	1:37.93
1994	1994 Winter Paralympics	Lillehammer, Norway	1st	Men's Super-G LW9	1:22.31
1994	1994 Winter Paralympics	Lillehammer, Norway	2nd	Men's Giant Slalom LW9	2:35.60
1994	1994 Winter Paralympics	Lillehammer, Norway	1st	Men's Downhill LW9	1:19.87

== See also ==
- List of Paralympic medalists in alpine skiing
