= United States at the 1988 Winter Paralympics =

- Flag of the United States
- IPC code: USA
- NPC: United States Paralympic Committee
- Website: www.teamusa.org/US-Paralympics
- Competitors: 45 (31 men and 14 women) in 3 sports
- Medals Ranked 6th: Gold 7 Silver 17 Bronze 6 Total 30

Winter Paralympics appearances (overview)
- 1976; 1980; 1984; 1988; 1992; 1994; 1998; 2002; 2006; 2010; 2014; 2018; 2022; 2026

The United States competed at the 1988 Winter Paralympics in Innsbruck, Austria. 45 competitors from the United States won 7 gold medals, 17 silver medal and 6 bronze medal and finished 6th in the medal table.

== Alpine skiing ==
The medalists are:

- (gold) Dan Ashbaugh, Men's Downhill LW1
- (gold) Dan Ashbaugh, Men's Giant Slalom LW1
- (gold) Dan Ashbaugh, Men's Slalom LW1
- (gold) Paul Dibello, Men's Giant Slalom LW3
- (gold) Diana Golden, Women's Downhill LW2
- (gold) Diana Golden, Women's Giant Slalom LW2
- (silver) Lana Jo Chapin, Women's Downhill LW4
- (silver) Lana Jo Chapin, Women's Giant Slalom LW4
- (silver) Cara Dunne, Women's Downhill B1
- (silver) Cara Dunne, Women's Giant Slalom B1
- (silver) Mark Godfrey, Men's Downhill LW1
- (silver) Mark Godfrey, Men's Giant Slalom LW1
- (silver) Mark Godfrey, Men's Slalom LW1
- (silver) Nancy Gustafson, Women's Downhill LW6/8
- (silver) Marilyn Hamilton, Women's Giant Slalom LW10
- (silver) Martha Hill, Women's Downhill LW2
- (silver) Martha Hill, Women's Slalom LW2
- (silver) David Jamison, Men's Slalom LW2
- (silver) Greg Mannino, Men's Downhill LW2
- (silver) Greg Mannino, Men's Giant Slalom LW2
- (silver) Kathy Pitcher, Women's Giant Slalom LW6/8
- (silver) Kip Roth, Men's Downhill LW5/7
- (silver) Kip Roth, Men's Slalom LW5/7
- (bronze) Don Garcia, Men's Slalom LW9
- (bronze) Rik Heid, Men's Downhill LW4
- (bronze) Rik Heid, Men's Slalom LW4
- (bronze) Robert Stroshine, Men's Downhill LW9
- (bronze) Robert Stroshine, Men's Giant Slalom LW9

== Biathlon ==
Four athletes competed in two events in biathlon: Tom Gall, William Henry, Richard Riley and Reed Robinson. No medals were won.

== Cross-country ==
The medalists are:

- (gold) Robert Walsh, Men's Short Distance 15 km B3
- (bronze) Joe Walsh, Men's Long Distance 30 km B3

== See also ==
- United States at the Paralympics
- United States at the 1988 Winter Olympics
