= Kathy Pitcher =

American para-alpine skier

Sport
- Country: United States
- Sport: Alpine skiing
Medal record
Paralympic Games
Silver medal – second place	1988 Innsbruck	Giant Slalom LW6/8

Kathy Pitcher is an American para-alpine skier. She represented the United States at the 1988 Winter Paralympics in Innsbruck, Austria in alpine skiing.

She won the silver medal at the Women's Giant Slalom LW6/8 event.
