= United States at the 1998 Winter Paralympics =

- Flag of the United States
- IPC code: USA
- NPC: United States Paralympic Committee
- Website: www.teamusa.org/US-Paralympics

in Nagano
- Competitors: 49
- Medals Ranked 3rd: Gold 13 Silver 8 Bronze 13 Total 34

Winter Paralympics appearances (overview)
- 1976; 1980; 1984; 1988; 1992; 1994; 1998; 2002; 2006; 2010; 2014; 2018; 2022; 2026

United States competed at the 1998 Winter Paralympics in Nagano, Japan. 49 competitors from United States won 34 medals including 13 gold, 8 silver and 13 bronze and finished 3rd in the medal table.

== See also ==
- United States at the Paralympics
- United States at the 1998 Winter Olympics
