= Bernard Baudean =

French para-alpine skier

Sport
- Country: France
- Sport: Para-alpine skiing
Medal record
Paralympic Games
Bronze medal – third place	1976 Örnsköldsvik	Slalom IV A
Gold medal – first place	1976 Örnsköldsvik	Giant Slalom IV A
Gold medal – first place	1976 Örnsköldsvik	Alpine Combination IV A
Gold medal – first place	1980 Geilo	Giant Slalom 2B
Silver medal – second place	1984 Innsbruck	Giant Slalom LW3
Silver medal – second place	1984 Innsbruck	Downhill LW3
Silver medal – second place	1988 Innsbruck	Giant Slalom LW3
Gold medal – first place	1988 Innsbruck	Downhill LW3
Silver medal – second place	1994 Lillehammer	Super-G LW1/3
Gold medal – first place	1994 Lillehammer	Giant Slalom LW1/3
Gold medal – first place	1994 Lillehammer	Downhill LW1/3

Bernard Baudean is a French para-alpine skier. He represented France in alpine skiing at six Winter Paralympics: in 1976, 1980, 1984, 1988, 1992 and 1994. In total, he won six gold medals, four silver medals and one bronze medal.

== Achievements ==
Year	Competition	Location	Position	Event	Time
1976	1976 Winter Paralympics	Örnsköldsvik, Sweden	3rd	Men's Slalom IV A	2:01.05
1976	1976 Winter Paralympics	Örnsköldsvik, Sweden	1st	Men's Giant Slalom IV A	3:24.34
1976	1976 Winter Paralympics	Örnsköldsvik, Sweden	1st	Men's Alpine Combination IV A	0:55.20
1980	1980 Winter Paralympics	Geilo, Norway	1st	Men's Giant Slalom 2B	2:33.02
1984	1984 Winter Paralympics	Innsbruck, Austria	2nd	Men's Giant Slalom LW3	1:31.02
1984	1984 Winter Paralympics	Innsbruck, Austria	2nd	Men's Downhill LW3	1:14.42
1988	1988 Winter Paralympics	Innsbruck, Austria	2nd	Men's Giant Slalom LW3	1:52.34
1988	1988 Winter Paralympics	Innsbruck, Austria	1st	Men's Downhill LW3	1:22.80
1994	1994 Winter Paralympics	Lillehammer, Norway	2nd	Men's Super-G LW1/3	1:23.85
1994	1994 Winter Paralympics	Lillehammer, Norway	1st	Men's Giant Slalom LW1/3	2:35.60
1994	1994 Winter Paralympics	Lillehammer, Norway	1st	Men's Downhill LW1/3	1:21.37

== See also ==
- List of Paralympic medalists in alpine skiing
