= French Paralympic and Sports Committee =

National Paralympic Committee of France

National Paralympic Committee
- Country: France
- Code: FRA
- Created: 1992
- Continental association: EPC
- Headquarters: Paris, France
- President: Marie-Amélie Le Fur
- Website: france-paralympique.fr

The French Paralympic and Sports Committee (French: Comité Paralympique et Sportif Français or CPSF) is the National Paralympic Committee in France for the Paralympic Games movement. Founded in Paris in 1992, it is a member of the International Paralympic Committee (IPC) and the French National Olympic and Sports Committee.

== See also ==
- France at the Paralympics
