= Alpine skiing at the 1984 Winter Paralympics – Women's downhill =

Women's Downhill at the III Paralympic Winter Games

The Women's Downhill competition of the Innsbruck 1984 Paralympics.

== Visually impaired ==
In the downhill visually impaired, the athlete with a visual impairment has a sighted guide.

=== B1 ===
B1 - visually impaired: no functional vision

Rank	Bib	Name	Country	Time	Difference
1st place, gold medalist(s)		Veronika Preining; Guide: ?	Austria	2:06.14	
2nd place, silver medalist(s)		Sheila Holzworth; Guide: ?	United States	2:32.42	+26.28
3rd place, bronze medalist(s)		Cara Dunne; Guide: Richard Zabelski	United States	2:36.93	+30.79

=== B2 ===
B2 - visually impaired: up to ca 3-5% functional vision

Rank	Bib	Name	Country	Time	Difference
1st place, gold medalist(s)		Edith Hoelzl; Guide: ?	Austria	1:43.06	
2nd place, silver medalist(s)		Vivienne Martin; Guide: ?	New Zealand	1:48.16	+5.10
3rd place, bronze medalist(s)		Connie Conley; Guide: ?	United States	1:55.27	+12.21
4		Monika Rumpler; Guide: ?	Austria	1:55.41	+12.35
5		Karen Rosmarin; Guide: ?	United States	1:58.93	+15.87
6		Chris Montgomery; Guide: ?	United States	2:02.68	+19.62
7		Suzy Germano; Guide: ?	United States	2:06.41	+23.35
		Gabriele Berghofer; Guide: ?	Austria	DNF	

== Standing ==
=== LW2 ===
LW2 - standing: single leg amputation above the knee

Rank	Bib	Name	Country	Time	Difference
1st place, gold medalist(s)		Christine Winkler	Austria	1:17.66	
2nd place, silver medalist(s)		Marianne Reiter	Austria	1:18.38	+0.72
3rd place, bronze medalist(s)		Lynda Chyzyk	Canada	1:20.28	+2.62
4		Martha Hill	United States	1:20.62	+2.96
5		Virginie Lopez	France	1:24.41	+6.75
6		Brigitte Rajchl	Austria	1:25.77	+8.11
7		Bonnie St. John	United States	1:25.93	+8.27
8		Patricia Craig	New Zealand	1:36.02	+18.36
9		Patti Werner	United States	1:36.57	+18.91
10		Wendy Mason	Great Britain	1:42.85	+25.19
11		Barbara Morrison	United States	1:43.77	+26.11
		Annemie Schneider	West Germany	DNS	
		Christine Tschuemperlin	Switzerland	DNF	

=== LW4 ===
LW4 - standing: single leg amputation below the knee

Rank	Bib	Name	Country	Time	Difference
1st place, gold medalist(s)		Reinhild Moeller	West Germany	1:13.01	
2nd place, silver medalist(s)		Lana Spreeman	Canada	1:17.97	+4.96
3rd place, bronze medalist(s)		Lana Jo Chapin	United States	1:19.76	+6.75
4		Elisabeth Osterwalder	Switzerland	1:26.25	+13.24
5		Beatrice Berthet	Switzerland	1:31.87	+18.86
6		Elisabeth Zerobin	Austria	2:39.37	+1:26.36
		Janet Penn	United States	DNF	+.

=== LW5/7 ===
LW5/7 - standing: double arm amputation

Rank	Bib	Name	Country	Time	Difference
1st place, gold medalist(s)		Brigitte Madlener	Austria	1:24.92	
2nd place, silver medalist(s)		Sabine Barisch	West Germany	1:27.65	+2.73
3rd place, bronze medalist(s)		Sabine Stiefbold	West Germany	1:36.27	+11.35

=== LW6/8 ===
LW6/8 - standing: single arm amputation

Rank	Bib	Name	Country	Time	Difference
1st place, gold medalist(s)		Gunilla Ahren	Sweden	1:09.20	
2nd place, silver medalist(s)		Kathy Poohachof	United States	1:12.44	+3.24
3rd place, bronze medalist(s)		Gerlinde Dullnig	Austria	1:14.89	+5.69
4		Eszbieta Dadok	Poland	1:17.65	+8.45
5		Eva Prihodova	Czechoslovakia	1:23.00	+13.80
6		Siv K. Tunge	Norway	1:25.24	+16.04
		Josiane Guichard	France	DNS	

== See also ==
- Alpine skiing at the 1984 Winter Olympics – Women's downhill
