= LW1 (classification) =

Paralympic skiing classification

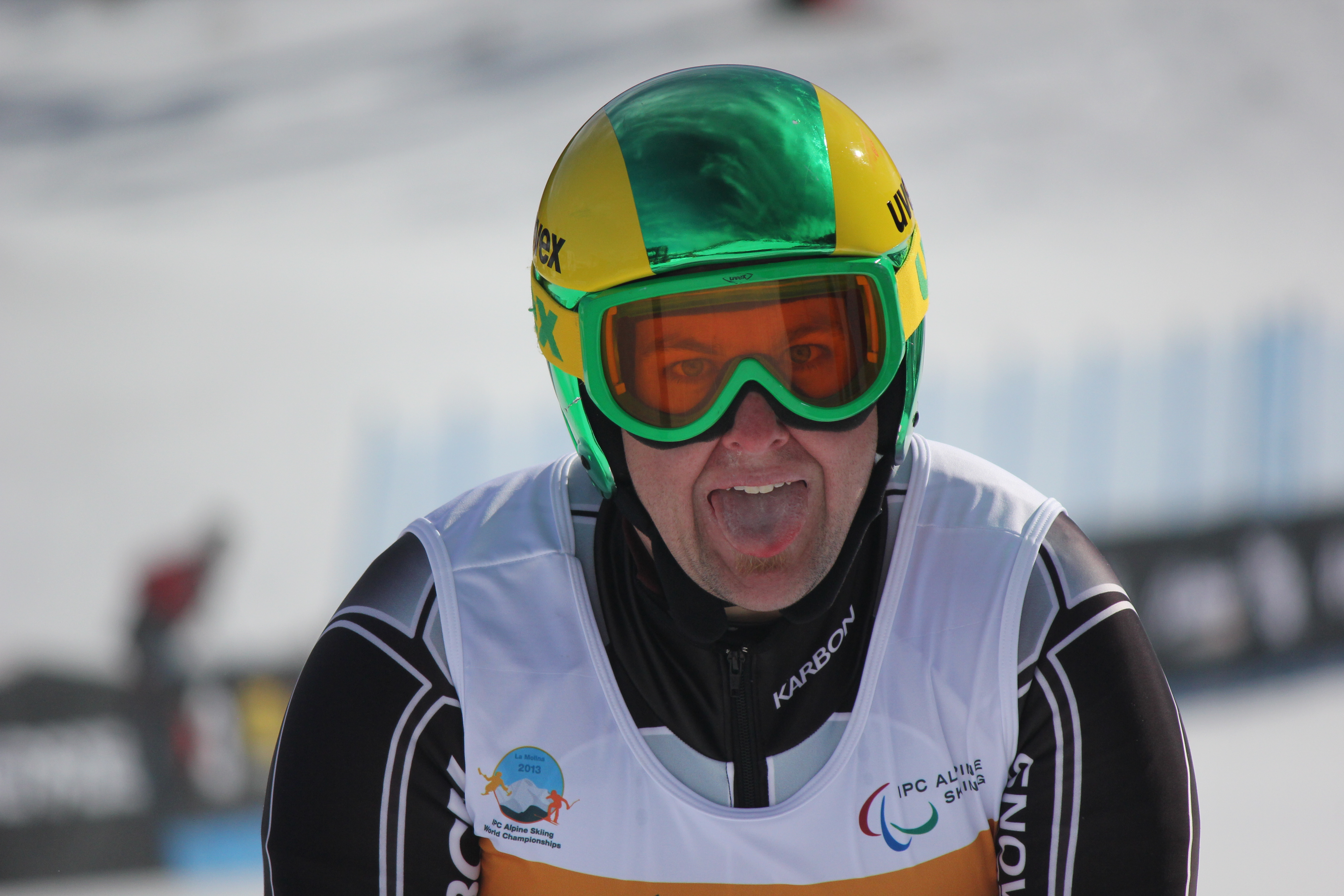
LW1 skier Adam Hall, New Zealand. 2013 IPC Alpine World Championships at La Molina in Spain. Day 2 of competition. Super-G final.

LW1 is a Para alpine standing skiing classification for people with severe lower extreme disabilities in both extremities. It includes both skiers with amputations and cerebral palsy. International classification is done through IPC Alpine Skiing, and national classification through local national sport federations. LW1 classified skiers use outriggers, and two skis or one ski with a prosthesis. Other equipment is used during training such as ski-tips, ski-bras, and short skis.

As this classification includes skiers with cerebral palsy and amputations, there are different skiing techniques used specific to these disability types. For skiers with amputations falling is an important skill to learn, while addressing balance is an important thing for skiers with cerebral palsy to master.

A factoring system is used to allow LW1 competitors to fairly compete against skiers in other standing classifications. At events such as the 1990 Disabled Alpine World Championships, this class had its own medal events. In later events such as the 2002 Winter Paralympics, it was grouped with other classes for a single medal event. Skiers in this class include New Zealanders Adam Hall and Kevin O'Sullivan.

== Definition ==
LW1 is a standing classification used in Para alpine skiing but not Para Nordic skiing. LW stands for Locomotor Winter, and the classification is for people with severe lower extreme disabilities in both extremities. They may have cerebral palsy and be classified as CP5 or CP6, or have spina bifida. The International Paralympic Committee explicitly defined this class as "Competitors with severe disabilities in both lower limbs ... The typical disability profile of the class is double above-knee amputation." In 2002, Australian Paralympic Committee defined this classification as a standing skiing classification with "Two skis, two poles, disability in both legs above the knees."

For international competitions, classification is done through IPC Alpine Skiing. A national federation such as Alpine Canada handles classification for domestic competitions. When being assessed into this classification, a number of things are considered including reviewing the skiers medical history and medical information on the skier's disability, having a physical and an in person assessment of the skier training or competing.

== Equipment ==
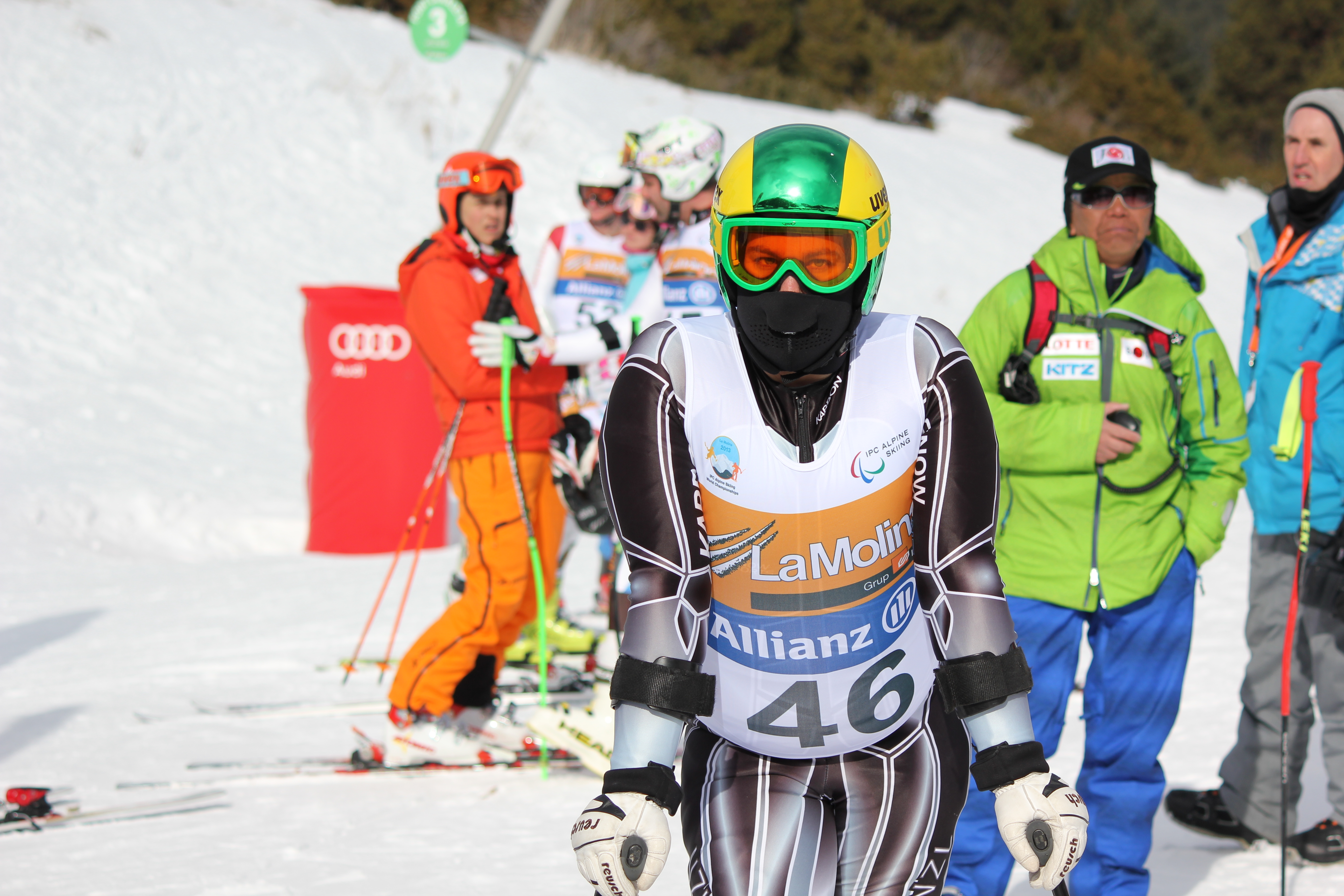
2013 IPC Alpine World Championships in La Molina, Spain, on super-combined competition day for the first run in the men's standing event

LW1 classified skiers use outriggers, and two skis or one ski with a prosthesis. International Ski Federation rules for ski boots and binding heights are modified for this class and are not the same rules used for able-bodied skiers. Skiers in this class are allowed to use ski-tips in competition, using a setup sometimes called a Four Track. In training, they may use additional equipment. For example, skiers with cerebral palsy may use cants, wedges, ski-bras, outriggers or short skis depending on the nature of their disability. Skiers with an amputation may use a prosthesis. As skiers in this classification improve, they require less use of this equipment. Ski bras are devices clamped to the tips of skis, which result in the skis being attached to each other. Outriggers are forearm crutches with a miniature ski on a rocker at the base. Cants are wedges that sit under the binding that are intended to more evenly distribute weight, and are customised for the specific needs of the skier. In the Biathlon, athletes with amputations can use a rifle support while shooting.

== Technique ==
As this classification includes skiers with cerebral palsy and amputations, there are different skiing techniques used specific to these disability types. While skiing, competitors have a wider turning radius as a result of their disability.

For skiers in this class with above the knee amputations, how to fall properly is an important skill. They are taught to try to prevent the stump of their leg from hitting the snow as it can cause more damage to that leg than the one that is not partially missing. When working on side stepping, the skier is supported to keep the stump of their leg on the uphill side. Elite skiers are taught to avoid using outriggers as crutches. They are taught to turn using their leg instead of their ski poles. In getting on ski lifts, skiers in this classification with amputations are taught to lift their outriggers off the ground and point them forward.

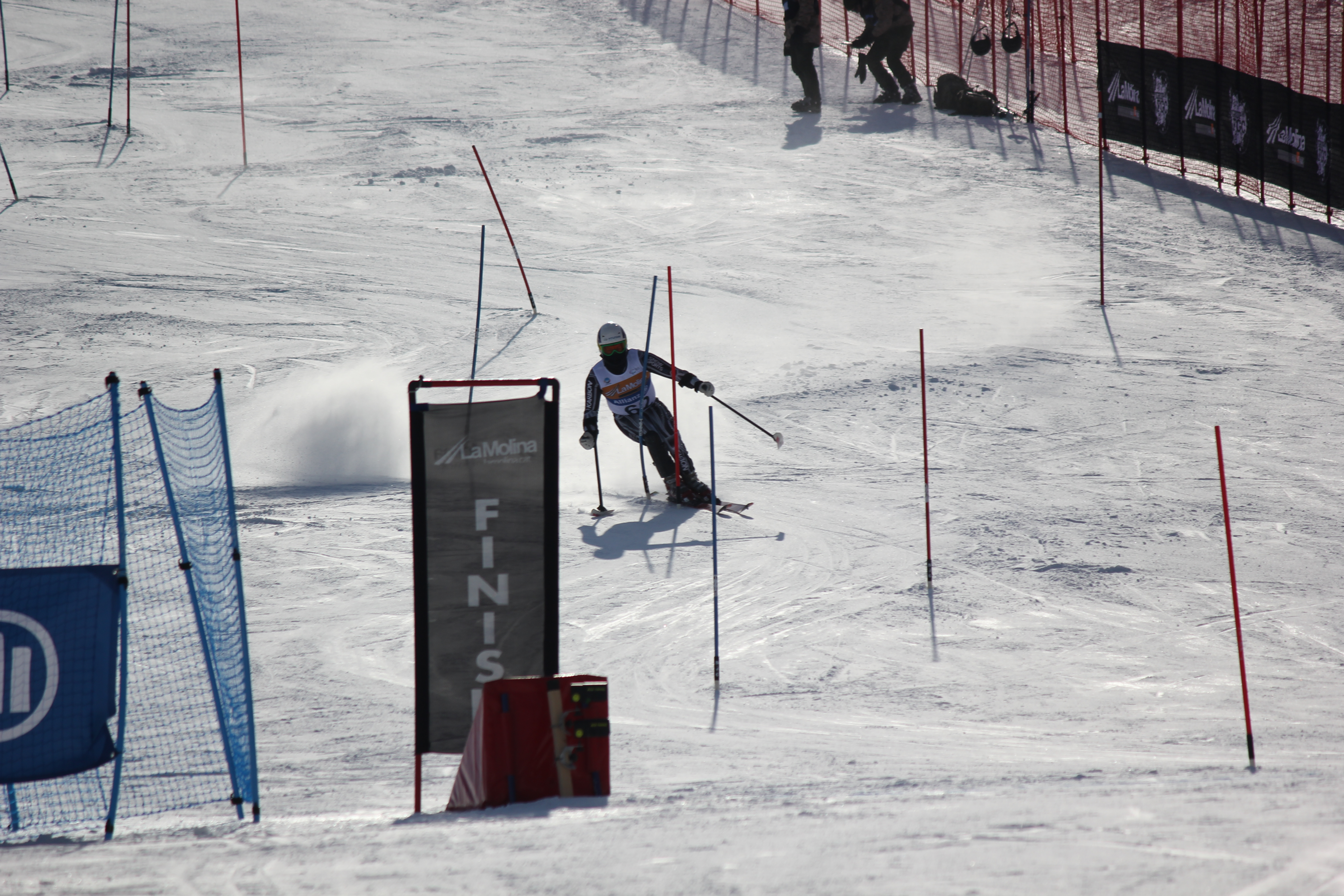
2013 IPC Alpine World Championships at La Molina in Spain. Day 3 of competition. Slalom final. Adam Hall of New Zealand.

Some skiers with cerebral palsy have better balance while using skis than they would otherwise. This presents challenges for coaches who are working with the skier. Compared to other skiers in the class, the skier with cerebral palsy may tire more quickly. In teaching skiers with cerebral palsy, instructors are encouraged to delay the introduction ski poles as skiers may overgrip them. Use of a ski bra is also encourage as it helps the skier learn correct knee and hip placement. Some skiers with cerebral palsy in this class have difficulty with the snowplough technique.

The American Teaching System is one learning method for competitors with cerebral palsy in this classification. Skiers first learn about their equipment, and how to put it on, before learning how to position their body in a standing position on flat terrain. After this, the skier learns how to side step, and then how to fall down and get back up again. The skier then learns how to do a straight run, and then is taught how to get on and off the chair lift. This is followed by learning wedge turns and weight transfers, wedge turns, wide track parallel turns, how to use ski poles, and advanced parallel turns. Skiers with cerebral palsy in this classification have difficulty walking in ski boots, and sometimes require assistance when walking in them. To go up hill, skiers often point their weaker side upwards.

In the Biathlon, all Paralympic athletes shoot from a prone position.

== Sport ==
In disability skiing events, this classification is grouped with standing classes who are seeded to start after visually impaired classes and before sitting classes in the Slalom and Giant slalom. In downhill, super-G and super combined, this same group competes after the visually impaired classes and sitting classes. The skier is required to have their ski poles or equivalent equipment planted in the snow in front of the starting position before the start of the race.

A factoring system is used in the sport to allow different classes to compete against each other when there are too few individual competitors in one class in a competition. The factoring system works by having a number for each class based on their functional mobility or vision levels, where the results are calculated by multiplying the finish time by the factored number. The resulting number is the one used to determine the winner in events where the factor system is used. In 2005, the men's Slalom alpine factor was 0.7999898. The LW1 factoring during the 2011/2012 skiing season was 0.838 for slalom, 0.8233 for giant slalom, 0.8203 for super-G and 0.8462 for downhill.

== Events ==
This class competed at its own medal events at competitions in the 1990s, before being grouped with other classes. LW1 was not grouped with other classes at the 1990 Disabled Alpine World Championships for disciplines that included the downhill. At the 1992 Winter Paralympics and 1994 Winter Paralympics, it was grouped with LW2 for men's para-alpine events. For the 1996 Disabled Alpine World Championships, in Lech, Austria, it was grouped with LW3 and LW5 for medal events. At the 1998 Winter Paralympics, the women's LW1, LW3, LW4, LW5 and LW6 classes competed in one group, with LW1, LW3 and LW5 grouped for men's medal events. At the 2002 Winter Paralympics, the LW1, LW4, LW5 and LW6 classes were combined for the women's downhill, giant slalom, and slalom events, while on the men's side, LW1, LW3, LW5 and LW9 were combined for the downhill and giant slalom events. There were no competitors from this class competing at the para-alpine 2009 World Championships on either the men's side or the women's side.

== Competitors ==
Skiers in this class include:

- Austria: Helmut Falch
- Canada: Wayne Burton, Stephen Ellefson
- Japan: Tsutomu Mino
- New Zealand: Adam Hall, Kevin O'Sullivan and Devin Shanks
- Switzerland: Edwin Zurbriggen
- United States: Dan Ashbaugh, Andy Fasth, Rod Hernley, Mark Godfrey
