= Alpine skiing at the 1984 Winter Paralympics =

Alpine skiing at the III Paralympic Winter Games

Alpine skiing at the 1984 Winter Paralympics consisted of 56 events, 34 for men and 22 for women.

== Medal table ==
Rank	Nation	Gold medal	Silver medal	Bronze medal	Total
1	Austria (AUT)	26	10	12	48
2	United States (USA)	7	13	14	34
3	West Germany (FRG)	7	6	8	21
4	Sweden (SWE)	6	1	1	8
5	Switzerland (SUI)	5	13	7	25
6	Canada (CAN)	2	8	4	14
7	France (FRA)	2	2	0	4
8	New Zealand (NZL)	1	3	1	5
9	Poland (POL)	0	0	4	4
10	Great Britain (GBR)	0	0	1	1
10	Italy (ITA)	0	0	1	1
10	Yugoslavia (YUG)	0	0	1	1
Total		56	56	54	166

== Medal summary ==
The competition events were:

- Downhill: men – women
- Giant slalom: men – women
- Slalom: men – women
- Alpine combination: men – women

Each event had separate standing, or visually impaired classifications:

- LW2 - standing: single leg amputation above the knee
- LW 3 - standing: double leg amputation below the knee, mild cerebral palsy, or equivalent impairment
- LW4 - standing: single leg amputation below the knee
- LW5/7 - standing: double arm amputation
- LW6/8 - standing: single arm amputation
- LW9 - standing: amputation or equivalent impairment of one arm and one leg
- B1 - visually impaired: no functional vision
- B2 - visually impaired: up to ca 3-5% functional vision

=== Men's events ===
Event	Class	Gold	Silver	Bronze
Downhill	B1	Karl Preining; Austria	Christopher Orr; New Zealand	Mike May; United States
Downhill	B2	Mark Bentz; Canada	Uli Rompel; Canada	August Hofer; Austria
Downhill	LW1	Helmut Falch; Austria	Andy Fasth; United States	Wayne Burton; Canada
Downhill	LW2	Rainer Bergmann; Austria	Christian Haeusle; Austria	Ola Rylander; Sweden
Downhill	LW3	Paul Dibello; United States	Bernard Baudean; France	Mark Edwards; New Zealand
Downhill	LW4	Markus Ramsauer; Austria	Josef Meusburger; Austria	Paul Fournier; Switzerland
Downhill	LW5/7	Niko Moll; West Germany	Lars Lundstroem; Sweden	Felix Abele; West Germany
Downhill	LW6/8	Rolf Heinzmann; Switzerland	Heinz Moser; Switzerland	Dietmar Schweninger; Austria
Downhill	LW9	Tristan Mouric; France	Hansueli Feuz; Switzerland	Peter Bartlome; Switzerland
Giant slalom	B1	Karl Preining; Austria	Rod Hersey; Canada	Mike May; United States
Giant slalom	B2	Odo Habermann; Austria	Glen Abramowski; United States	Jean-Pierre Kurth; Switzerland
Giant slalom	LW1	Helmut Falch; Austria	Andy Fasth; United States	Edwin Zurbriggen; Switzerland
Giant slalom	LW2	Rainer Bergmann; Austria	Alexander Spitz; West Germany	Peter Perner; Austria
Giant slalom	LW3	Paul Dibello; United States	Bernard Baudean; France	Gerhard Langer; Austria
Giant slalom	LW4	Josef Meusburger; Austria	Paul Fournier; Switzerland	Eugen Diethelm; Switzerland
Giant slalom	LW5/7	Niko Moll; West Germany	Felix Gisler; Switzerland	Felix Abele; West Germany
Giant slalom	LW6/8	Dietmar Schweninger; Austria	Paul Neukomm; Switzerland	Meinhard Tatschl; Austria
Giant slalom	LW9	Peter Bartlome; Switzerland	Walter Kaelin; Switzerland	Robert Cadisch; Switzerland
Slalom	LW1	Helmut Falch; Austria	Wayne Burton; Canada	Rod Hernley; United States
Slalom	LW2	Ola Rylander; Sweden	Rainer Bergmann; Austria	David Jamison; United States
Slalom	LW3	Paul Dibello; United States	Gerhard Langer; Austria	Franciszek Tracz; Poland
Slalom	LW4	Josef Meusburger; Austria	Paul Fournier; Switzerland	Markus Ramsauer; Austria
Slalom	LW5/7	Lars Lundstroem; Sweden	Niko Moll; West Germany	Murray Bedel; Canada
Slalom	LW6/8	Rolf Heinzmann; Switzerland	Michael Knaus; Austria	Reed Robinson; United States
Slalom	LW9	Tristan Mouric; France	Brad Hudiberg; United States	Walter Kaelin; Switzerland
Alpine combination	B1	Karl Preining; Austria	Rod Hersey; Canada	Mike May; United States
Alpine combination	B2	Mark Bentz; Canada	Uli Rompel; Canada	Bruno Oberhammer; Italy
Alpine combination	LW1	Helmut Falch; Austria	Edwin Zurbriggen; Switzerland	None
Alpine combination	LW2	Rainer Bergmann; Austria	Peter Perner; Austria	Alexander Spitz; West Germany
Alpine combination	LW3	Paul Dibello; United States	Jack Benedick; United States	Gerhard Langer; Austria
Alpine combination	LW4	Josef Meusburger; Austria	Paul Fournier; Switzerland	Ewald Vogl; West Germany
Alpine combination	LW5/7	Niko Moll; West Germany	Felix Gisler; Switzerland	John Watkins; Great Britain
Alpine combination	LW6/8	Rolf Heinzmann; Switzerland	Heinz Moser; Switzerland	Franc Komar; Yugoslavia
Alpine combination	LW9	Peter Bartlome; Switzerland	Walter Kaelin; Switzerland	None

=== Women's events ===
Event	Class	Gold	Silver	Bronze
Downhill	B1	Veronika Preining; Austria	Sheila Holzworth; United States	Cara Dunne; United States
Downhill	B2	Edith Hoelzl; Austria	Vivienne Martin; New Zealand	Connie Conley; United States
Downhill	LW2	Christine Winkler; Austria	Marianne Reiter; Austria	Lynda Chyzyk; Canada
Downhill	LW4	Reinhild Moeller; West Germany	Lana Spreeman; Canada	Lana Jo Chapin; United States
Downhill	LW5/7	Brigitte Madlener; Austria	Sabine Barisch; West Germany	Sabine Stiefbold; West Germany
Downhill	LW6/8	Gunilla Ahren; Sweden	Kathy Poohachof; United States	Gerlinde Dullnig; Austria
Giant slalom	B1	Sheila Holzworth; United States	Cara Dunne; United States	Veronika Preining; Austria
Giant slalom	B2	Vivienne Martin; New Zealand	Connie Conley; United States	Gabriele Berghofer; Austria
Giant slalom	LW2	Christine Winkler; Austria	Lynda Chyzyk; Canada	Bonnie St. John; United States
Giant slalom	LW4	Reinhild Moeller; West Germany	Lana Spreeman; Canada	Janet Penn; United States
Giant slalom	LW5/7	Brigitte Madlener; Austria	Sabine Stiefbold; West Germany	Sabine Barisch; West Germany
Giant slalom	LW6/8	Gunilla Ahren; Sweden	Kathy Poohachof; United States	Eszbieta Dadok; Poland
Slalom	LW2	Marianne Reiter; Austria	Christine Winkler; Austria	Bonnie St. John; United States
Slalom	LW4	Janet Penn; United States	Reinhild Moeller; West Germany	Elisabeth Zerobin; Austria
Slalom	LW5/7	Sabine Stiefbold; West Germany	Brigitte Madlener; Austria	Sabine Barisch; West Germany
Slalom	LW6/8	Gunilla Ahren; Sweden	Kathy Poohachof; United States	Eszbieta Dadok; Poland
Alpine combination	B1	Sheila Holzworth; United States	Veronika Preining; Austria	Cara Dunne; United States
Alpine combination	B2	Edith Hoelzl; Austria	Vivienne Martin; New Zealand	Connie Conley; United States
Alpine combination	LW2	Christine Winkler; Austria	Bonnie St. John; United States	Lynda Chyzyk; Canada
Alpine combination	LW4	Reinhild Moeller; West Germany	Elisabeth Osterwalder; Switzerland	Elisabeth Zerobin; Austria
Alpine combination	LW5/7	Brigitte Madlener; Austria	Sabine Stiefbold; West Germany	Sabine Barisch; West Germany
Alpine combination	LW6/8	Gunilla Ahren; Sweden	Kathy Poohachof; United States	Eszbieta Dadok; Poland

== See also ==
- Alpine skiing at the 1984 Winter Olympics
