= United States at the 1984 Winter Paralympics =

- Flag of the United States
- IPC code: USA
- NPC: United States Paralympic Committee
- Website: www.teamusa.org/US-Paralympics

in Innsbruck
- Competitors: 51
- Medals Ranked 5th: Gold 7 Silver 14 Bronze 14 Total 35

Winter Paralympics appearances (overview)
- 1976; 1980; 1984; 1988; 1992; 1994; 1998; 2002; 2006; 2010; 2014; 2018; 2022; 2026

The United States sent a delegation to compete at the 1984 Winter Paralympics in Innsbruck, Austria.

The United States finished 5th in the gold medal and 4th in the total medal count.

== Medalists ==
The following American athletes won medals at the games. In the 'by discipline' sections below, medalists' names are in bold.

Medal	Name	Sport	Event	Date
Gold	Paul Dibello	Alpine skiing	Men's downhill, LW3	
Gold	Paul Dibello	Alpine skiing	Men's giant slalom, LW3	
Gold	Paul Dibello	Alpine skiing	Men's slalom, LW3	
Gold	Paul Dibello	Alpine skiing	Men's alpine combination, LW3	
Gold	Sheila Holzworth	Alpine skiing	Women's giant slalom, B1	
Gold	Sheila Holzworth	Alpine skiing	Women's alpine combination, B1	
Gold	Janet Penn	Alpine skiing	Women's slalom, LW4	
Silver	Andy Fasth	Alpine skiing	Men's downhill, LW1	
Silver	Andy Fasth	Alpine skiing	Men's giant slalom, LW1	
Silver	Glen Abramowski	Alpine skiing	Men's giant slalom, B2	
Silver	Brad Hudiberg	Alpine skiing	Men's slalom, LW9	
Silver	Jack Benedick	Alpine skiing	Men's alpine combination, LW3	
Silver	Sheila Holzworth	Alpine skiing	Women's downhill, B1	
Silver	Kathy Poohachof	Alpine skiing	Women's downhill, LW6/8	
Silver	Cara Dunne	Alpine skiing	Women's giant slalom, B1	
Silver	Connie Conley	Alpine skiing	Women's giant slalom, B2	
Silver	Kathy Poohachof	Alpine skiing	Women's giant slalom, LW6/8	
Silver	Kathy Poohachof	Alpine skiing	Women's slalom, LW6/8	
Silver	Kathy Poohachof	Alpine skiing	Women's alpine combination, LW6/8	
Silver	Bonnie St. John	Alpine skiing	Women's alpine combination, LW2	
Silver	Barbara Lewis; Laura Oftedahl; Jean Parker; Billie Ruth Schlank	Cross-country skiing	Women's 4×5 km relay	
Bronze	Mike May	Alpine skiing	Men's downhill, B1	
Bronze	Mike May	Alpine skiing	Men's giant slalom, B1	
Bronze	Mike May	Alpine skiing	Men's alpine combination, B1	
Bronze	Rod Hernley	Alpine skiing	Men's slalom, LW1	
Bronze	David Jamison	Alpine skiing	Men's slalom, LW2	
Bronze	Reed Robinson	Alpine skiing	Men's slalom, LW6/8	
Bronze	Cara Dunne	Alpine skiing	Women's downhill, B1	
Bronze	Cara Dunne	Alpine skiing	Women's alpine combination, B1	
Bronze	Connie Conley	Alpine skiing	Women's downhill, B2	
Bronze	Connie Conley	Alpine skiing	Women's alpine combination, B2	
Bronze	Lana Jo Chapin	Alpine skiing	Women's downhill, LW4	
Bronze	Bonnie St. John	Alpine skiing	Women's giant slalom, LW2	
Bronze	Bonnie St. John	Alpine skiing	Women's slalom, LW2	
Bronze	Janet Penn	Alpine skiing	Women's giant slalom, LW4	

**Medals by sport**
**Sport**	Gold medal	Silver medal	Bronze medal	**Total**
Alpine skiing	7	13	14	34
Cross-country skiing	0	1	0	1

**Multiple medalists**
**Name**	**Sport**	Gold medal	Silver medal	Bronze medal	**Total**
Paul Dibello	Alpine skiing	4	0	0	4
Sheila Holzworth	Alpine skiing	2	1	0	3
Janet Penn	Alpine skiing	1	0	1	2
Kathy Poohachof	Alpine skiing	0	4	0	4
Andy Fasth	Alpine skiing	0	2	0	2
Cara Dunne	Alpine skiing	0	1	2	3
Connie Conley	Alpine skiing	0	1	2	3
Bonnie St. John	Alpine skiing	0	1	2	3
Mike May	Alpine skiing	0	0	3	3

== Classification ==
Each event had separate standing, sitting, or visually impaired classifications:

- LW2 - standing: single leg amputation above the knee
- LW 3 - standing: double leg amputation below the knee, mild cerebral palsy, or equivalent impairment
- LW4 - standing: single leg amputation below the knee
- LW5/7 - standing: double arm amputation
- LW6/8 - standing: single arm amputation
- LW9 - standing: amputation or equivalent impairment of one arm and one leg
- Gr I - sitting: paraplegia with no or some upper abdominal function and no functional sitting balance
- Gr II - sitting: paraplegia with fair functional sitting balance
- B1 - visually impaired: no functional vision
- B2 - visually impaired: up to ca 3-5% functional vision

== Cross-country skiing ==
Women

Athlete	Events	Class	Factor %	Qualification		Semifinal		Final	
Athlete	Events	Class	Factor %	Time	Rank	Time	Rank	Time	Rank
Barbara Lewis; Laura Oftedahl; Jean Parker; Billie Ruth Schlank	4×5 km relay	open							2nd place, silver medalist(s)

== See also ==
- United States at the 1984 Winter Olympics
