= Cross-country skiing at the 1984 Winter Paralympics – Women's 4x5 km relay B1-2 =

Women's 4x5 km relay B1-2 at the III Paralympic Winter Games
- Dates: January 1984
- Competitors: 8 from 2 nations

Medalists
1st place, gold medalist(s)		Doris Campbell; Margaret Heger; Renata Hoenisch; Marianne Kriegl	Austria
2nd place, silver medalist(s)		Barbara Lewis; Laura Oftedahl; Jean Parker; Billie Ruth Schlank	United States

The Women's 4x5 km relay B1-2 event was one of the events held in cross-country skiing at the 1984 Winter Paralympics in Innsbruck, Austria.

Two teams from two nations competed in the event.

== Results ==
=== Final ===
Rank	Athletes
1st place, gold medalist(s)	Doris Campbell; Margaret Heger; Renata Hoenisch; Marianne Kriegl
2nd place, silver medalist(s)	Barbara Lewis; Laura Oftedahl; Jean Parker; Billie Ruth Schlank
