= Cross-country skiing at the 1984 Winter Paralympics =

1984 paralympics event

Cross-country skiing at the III Paralympic Winter Games

Cross-country skiing at the 1984 Winter Paralympics consisted of 35 events, 23 for men and 12 for women.

== Medal table ==
Rank	Nation	Gold medal	Silver medal	Bronze medal	Total
1	Finland (FIN)	12	9	6	27
2	Austria (AUT)	8	8	5	21
3	Norway (NOR)	6	3	2	11
4	West Germany (FRG)	3	8	2	13
5	Poland (POL)	3	2	4	9
6	France (FRA)	2	0	0	2
7	Sweden (SWE)	1	1	4	6
8	Switzerland (SUI)	0	3	9	12
9	United States (USA)	0	1	0	1
10	Great Britain (GBR)	0	0	1	1
Total		35	35	33	103

== Medal summary ==
The competition events were:

- 2.5 km: - women
- 5 km: men - women
- 10 km: men - women
- 20 km: men
- 3x2.5 km relay: men
- 3x5 km relay: - women
- 4x5 km relay: men - women
- 4x10 km relay: men

Each event had separate standing, sitting, or visually impaired classifications:

- LW2 - standing: single leg amputation above the knee
- LW 3 - standing: double leg amputation below the knee, mild cerebral palsy, or equivalent impairment
- LW4 - standing: single leg amputation below the knee
- LW5/7 - standing: double arm amputation
- LW6/8 - standing: single arm amputation
- LW9 - standing: amputation or equivalent impairment of one arm and one leg
- Gr I - sitting: paraplegia with no or some upper abdominal function and no functional sitting balance
- Gr II - sitting: paraplegia with fair functional sitting balance
- B1 - visually impaired: no functional vision
- B2 - visually impaired: up to ca 3-5% functional vision

=== Men's events ===
Event	Class	Gold	Silver	Bronze
5 km - short distance	Gr I	Reinhold Sager; Austria	Adolf Stuber; West Germany	Peter Gilomen; Switzerland
5 km - short distance	Gr II	Georg Freund; Austria	Siegwald Mussger; Austria	Josef Dietziker; Switzerland
5 km - short distance	LW2	Pertti Sankilampi; Finland	Samuli Kaemi; Finland	Ari Mustonen; Finland
5 km - short distance	LW3	Marianne Niedzwiadek; Poland	Kazimierz Wyszowski; Poland	Czeslav Kwiatkowski; Poland
5 km - short distance	LW4	Veikko Jantunen; Finland	Svein Lilleberg; Norway	Reinhold Schwer; West Germany
5 km - short distance	LW5/7	Pierre Delaval; France	Frank Rawiel; West Germany	Horst Morokutti; Austria
5 km - short distance	LW9	Ludwig Wagner; West Germany	Armin Arnold; Switzerland	Peter Kieweg; Austria
10 km - short distance	B1	Hans Anton Aalien; Norway	Martti Juntunen; Finland	Peter Young; Great Britain
10 km - short distance	B2	Terje Loevaas; Norway	Gorm Borgersen; Norway	Morten Langeroed; Norway
10 km - short distance	LW6/8	Jouko Grip; Finland	Kimmo Kettunen; Finland	Heikki Miettinen; Finland
10 km - middle distance	B1	Hans Anton Aalien; Norway	Martti Juntunen; Finland	Mauno Sulisalo; Finland
10 km - middle distance	B2	Terje Loevaas; Norway	Morten Langeroed; Norway	Gorm Borgersen; Norway
10 km - middle distance	Gr I	Reinhold Sager; Austria	Adolf Stuber; West Germany	Heinz Frei; Switzerland
10 km - middle distance	Gr II	Georg Freund; Austria	Siegwald Mussger; Austria	Josef Dietziker; Switzerland
10 km - middle distance	LW2	Samuli Kaemi; Finland	Pertti Sankilampi; Finland	Tauno Seppaenen; Finland
10 km - middle distance	LW3	Marianne Niedzwiadek; Poland	Kazimierz Wyszowski; Poland	Czeslav Kwiatkowski; Poland
10 km - middle distance	LW4	Svein Lilleberg; Norway	Reinhold Schwer; West Germany	Veikko Jantunen; Finland
10 km - middle distance	LW5/7	Pierre Delaval; France	Horst Morokutti; Austria	Frank Rawiel; West Germany
10 km - middle distance	LW9	Ludwig Wagner; West Germany	Armin Arnold; Switzerland	Peter Kieweg; Austria
20 km - middle distance	LW6/8	Jouko Grip; Finland	Theo Feger; West Germany	Rune Karlsson; Sweden
3×2.5 km relay	Gr I-II	Austria (AUT); Georg Freund; Siegwald Mussger; Reinhold Sager	Austria (AUT); Hermann Gaun; Josef Siebenhofer; Reinhold Wessely	Switzerland (SUI); Josef Dietziker; Heinz Frei; Peter Gilomen
4×5 km relay	LW2-9	Finland (FIN); Jouko Grip; Veikko Jantunen; Kimmo Kettunen; Heikki Miettinen	Finland (FIN); Samuli Kaemi; Lauri Moilanen; Pertti Sankilampi; Erkki Seppaenen	Sweden (SWE); Allan Danielsson; Kent Engstroem; Rune Karlsson; Bertil Lundmark
4×10 km relay	B1-2	Norway (NOR); Hans Anton Aalien; Gorm Borgersen; Terje Loevaas; Olai Myklebust	Finland (FIN); Ismo Alanko; Martti Juntunen; Mauno Sulisalo; Teuvo Talmia	Sweden (SWE); Yngve Eriksson; Ove Karlsson; Ake Pettersson; George Witthof

=== Women's events ===
Event	Class	Gold	Silver	Bronze
2.5 km - short distance	Gr II	Hildegard Fetz; Austria	Johanna Ratzinger; Austria	Karoline Pavlicek; Switzerland
5 km - short distance	B1	Kirsti Pennanen; Finland	Margret Heger; Austria	Marianne Edfeldt; Sweden
5 km - short distance	B2	Kyllikki Luhtapuro; Finland	Desiree Johansson; Sweden	Tarja Hovinen; Finland
5 km - short distance	LW4	Liisa Maekelae; Finland	Anneliese Tenzler; West Germany	Monika Waelti; Switzerland
5 km - short distance	LW6/8	Alli Hatva; Finland	Dorothea Neuweiler; West Germany	Barbara Chmielecka; Poland
5 km - middle distance	Gr II	Hildegard Fetz; Austria	Johanna Ratzinger; Austria	Karoline Pavlicek; Switzerland
10 km - middle distance	B1	Kirsti Pennanen; Finland	Margret Heger; Austria	Doris Campbell; Austria
10 km - middle distance	B2	Desiree Johansson; Sweden	Kyllikki Luhtapuro; Finland	Renata Hoenisch; Austria
10 km - middle distance	LW4	Anneliese Tenzler; West Germany	Liisa Maekelae; Finland	Monika Waelti; Switzerland
10 km - middle distance	LW6/8	Alli Hatva; Finland	Dorothea Neuweiler; West Germany	Barbara Chmielecka; Poland
3×5 km relay	LW2-9	Poland (POL); Barbara Chmielecka; Jolanta Kochanaowska; Henryka Sadowska	Switzerland (SUI); Heidi Aviolat; Monika Waelti; Yvonne Wyssen	None
4×5 km relay	B1-2	Austria (AUT); Doris Campbell; Margaret Heger; Renata Hoenisch; Marianne Kriegl	United States (USA); Barbara Lewis; Laura Oftedahl; Jean Parker; Billie Ruth Schlank	None

== See also ==
- Cross-country skiing at the 1984 Winter Olympics
