= Sabine Stiefbold =

German Paralympic skier

Sport
- Country: West Germany
- Sport: Alpine skiing
Medal record
Alpine skiing
Representing West Germany
Paralympic Games
Gold medal – first place	1984 Innsbruck	Slalom LW5/7
Silver medal – second place	1984 Innsbruck	Giant slalom LW5/7
Silver medal – second place	1984 Innsbruck	Alpine combination LW5/7
Bronze medal – third place	1980 Geilo	Giant slalom 3B
Bronze medal – third place	1984 Innsbruck	Downhill LW5/7

Sabine Stiefbold is a German Paralympic skier, who represented West Germany in alpine skiing at the 1980 Paralympic Winter Games, and 1984 Paralympic Winter Games. She won a total of five medals, including one gold medal, two silver medals. and two bronze medals.

== Career ==
At the 1980 Paralympic Winter Games, Stiefbold ranked 3rd in the 3B giant slalom with a time of 3: 15.88 (1st place Brigitte Madlener who finished the race in 2: 52.86 and 2nd place Sabine Barisch in 3: 13.47), and 4th place in the special slalom in 3: 13.47).

At the 1984 Paralympic Winter Games, in Innsbruck, she won a total of four medals: gold in the slalom LW5 / 7 (with a realized time of 1: 33.78), two silvers (in the giant slalom races in 1:48.22, and alpine super combined in 2: 48.72), and a bronze in downhill (bronze with a time of 1: 36.27, gold for the Austrian athlete Brigitte Madlener in 1: 24.92 and silver for compatriot Sabine Barisch in 1:27.65); all in the LW5 / 7 category.
