= Sabine Barisch =

German Paralympic skier

Sport
- Country: West Germany
- Sport: Alpine skiing
Medal record
Alpine skiing
Representing West Germany
Paralympic Games
Gold medal – first place	1980 Geilo	Slalom 3B
Silver medal – second place	1980 Geilo	Giant slalom 3B
Silver medal – second place	1984 Innsbruck	Downhill LW5/7
Bronze medal – third place	1984 Innsbruck	Giant slalom LW5/7
Bronze medal – third place	1984 Innsbruck	Slalom LW5/7
Bronze medal – third place	1984 Innsbruck	Alpine combination LW5/7

Sabine Barisch is a German Paralympic skier. She represented West Germany in para-alpine skiing at the 1980 Paralympic Winter Games, and 1984 Paralympic Winter Games. She won a total of six medals, including one gold medal, two silver medals and three bronze medals.

== Career ==
At the 1980 Winter Paralympics, Berghofer won the gold medal in the 3B slalom with a time of 1:38.23 (in 2nd place Brigitte Madlener who finished in 1:40.68 and in 3rd place Evelyn Werner in 1:45.87). She won a silver medal in the giant slalom in 3:13.47 (on the podium, Brigitte Madlener, gold medal in 2:52.86 and Sabine Stiefbold, bronze medal in 3:15.88).

At the 1984 Winter Paralympics in Innsbruck, she won a silver medal in the downhill LW5 / 7 (with a realized time of 1: 27.65), and three bronze medals: in the slalom, giant slalom and alpine super combined; all in the LW5 / 7 category.
