= 1984 Winter Paralympics medal table =

1984 Winter Paralympics medals
- Location: Innsbruck Austria

Highlights
- Most gold medals: Austria (34)
- Most total medals: Austria (70)
- Medalling NPCs: 14

The 1984 Winter Paralympics medal table is a list of National Paralympic Committees (NPCs) ranked by the number of gold medals won by their athletes during the 1984 Winter Paralympics, held in Innsbruck, Austria, from January 14 to January 20, 1984.

== Medal table ==
The ranking in this table is based on information provided by the International Paralympic Committee (IPC) and is consistent with IPC convention in its published medal tables. By default, the table is ordered by the number of gold medals the athletes from a nation have won (in this context, a "nation" is an entity represented by a National Paralympic Committee). The number of silver medals is taken into consideration next and then the number of bronze medals. If nations are still tied, equal ranking is given and they are listed alphabetically by IPC country code.

To sort this table by nation, total medal count, or any other column, click on the icon next to the column title.

* Host nation (Austria)

Rank	Nation	Gold	Silver	Bronze	Total
1	Austria*	34	19	17	70
2	Finland	19	9	6	34
3	Norway	15	13	13	41
4	West Germany	10	14	10	34
5	United States	7	14	14	35
6	Sweden	7	2	5	14
7	Switzerland	5	16	16	37
8	France	4	2	0	6
9	Poland	3	2	8	13
10	Canada	2	8	4	14
11	New Zealand	1	3	1	5
12	Great Britain	0	4	6	10
13	Italy	0	0	1	1
13	Yugoslavia	0	0	1	1
Totals (14 entries)		107	106	102	315

== See also ==
- 1984 Winter Olympics medal table
- 1984 Summer Paralympics medal table
