= Béatrice Berthet =

Swiss Paralympic skier

Sport
- Country: Switzerland
- Sport: Alpine skiing
Medal record
Alpine skiing
Representing Switzerland
Paralympic Games
| Bronze medal – third place | 1988 Innsbruck | Giant slalom LW4 |
| Bronze medal – third place | 1988 Innsbruck | Slalom LW4 |

Béatrice Berthet is a Swiss Paralympic skier. She represented Switzerland in Paralympic Alpine skiing at the 1984 Paralympic Winter Games, 1988 Paralympic Winter Games, and 1992 Paralympic Winter Games. She won two bronze medals in Innsbruck 1988.

== Career ==
At the 1984 Winter Paralympics, she placed fifth in the Women's downhill LW4.

At the 1988 Winter Paralympic Games in Innsbruck, Berthet finished in 3rd place in the LW10 slalom in 1: 45.39 (on the podium Reinhild Möller who finished the race in 1: 27.46 and second Lana Spreeman in 1: 32.29 ), and in the giant slalom (third place with a time of 2: 24.85, behind the German Reinhild Möller in 1: 53.35 and the American Lana Jo Chapin in 2: 03.43) .

At the 1992 Winter Paralympics, she placed sixth in the women's slalom LW3,4,9.
