= Gerlinde Dullnig =

Austrian para-alpine skier

Sport
- Country: Austria
- Sport: Para-alpine skiing
Medal record
Paralympic Games
Bronze medal – third place	1984 Innsbruck	Downhill LW6/8

Gerlinde Dullnig is an Austrian para-alpine skier. She represented Austria at the 1984 Winter Paralympics in four alpine skiing events.

== Career ==
At the 1984 Winter Paralympics, she won the bronze medal in the Women's Downhill LW6/8 event.

She finished in 4th place in the giant slalom, and combined, and in 6th place in the slalom.

== See also ==
- List of Paralympic medalists in alpine skiing
