= Edwin Zurbriggen =

Swiss para-alpine skier

Sport
- Country: Switzerland
- Sport: Para-alpine skiing
- Disability class: LW1
Medal record
Paralympic Games
Silver medal – second place	1984 Innsbruck	Alpine Combination LW1
Bronze medal – third place	1984 Innsbruck	Giant Slalom LW1

Edwin Zurbriggen is a Swiss para-alpine skier with disability class LW1. He represented Switzerland at the 1984 Winter Paralympics.

He won the silver medal in the event and the bronze medal in Alpine Combination LW1 and Giant Slalom LW1 events respectively.

== See also ==
- List of Paralympic medalists in alpine skiing
