= Alpine skiing at the 1988 Winter Paralympics – Men's slalom LW1 =

Men's slalom LW1 at the IV Paralympic Winter Games
- Dates: January 1988
- Competitors: 5 from 4 nations

Medalists
1st place, gold medalist(s)		Dan Ashbaugh	United States
2nd place, silver medalist(s)		Mark Godfrey	United States
3rd place, bronze medalist(s)		none awarded	

The men's slalom LW1 was one of the events held in Alpine skiing at the 1988 Winter Paralympics in Innsbruck.

There were five competitors in the final. Three out of five competitors were disqualified and as a result only two medals were awarded.

== Results ==
=== Final ===
Rank	Athlete	Time
1st place, gold medalist(s)	Dan Ashbaugh (USA)	1:37.03
2nd place, silver medalist(s)	Mark Godfrey (USA)	1:39.39
	Torres Jose Bombillar (ESP)	DSQ
	Tsutomu Mino (JPN)	DSQ
	Stephen Ellefson (CAN)	DSQ
