= Vivienne Martin =

Vivienne Martin may refer to:

- Vivienne Gapes, formerly Vivienne Martin, New Zealand Paralympic skier
- Vivienne Martin (actress), New Zealand-born English actress

== See also ==
- Vivian Martin, American stage and silent film actress
