= Dietmar Schweninger =

Austrian para-alpine skier

Sport
- Country: Austria
- Sport: Para-alpine skiing
Medal record
Paralympic Games
Bronze medal – third place	1980 Geilo	Slalom 3A
Bronze medal – third place	1984 Innsbruck	Downhill LW6/8
Gold medal – first place	1984 Innsbruck	Giant Slalom LW6/8
Gold medal – first place	1988 Innsbruck	Slalom LW6/8

Dietmar Schweninger is an Austrian para-alpine skier. He represented Austria at the 1980 Winter Paralympics, at the 1984 Winter Paralympics and at the 1988 Winter Paralympics. In total, he won two gold medals and two bronze medals in alpine skiing.

He also competed in the Men's giant slalom for single-arm amputees event in disabled skiing at the 1984 Winter Olympics, a demonstration sport during the 1984 Winter Olympics.

== Achievements ==
Year	Competition	Location	Position	Event	Time
1980	1980 Winter Paralympics	Geilo, Norway	3rd	Men's Slalom 3A	1:36.32
1984	1984 Winter Paralympics	Innsbruck, Austria	3rd	Men's Downhill LW6/8	1:03.19
1984	1984 Winter Paralympics	Innsbruck, Austria	1st	Men's Giant Slalom LW6/8	1:16.90
1988	1988 Winter Paralympics	Innsbruck, Austria	1st	Men's Slalom LW6/8	1:14.76

== See also ==
- List of Paralympic medalists in alpine skiing
