= Gabriele Berghofer =

Austrian Paralympic skier

Personal information
- Born: 26 June 1963 (age 63)

Sport
- Country: Austria
- Sport: Para athletics Para alpine skiing Para Nordic skiing Para biathlon
- Disability class: B2
Medal record
Representing Austria
Summer Paralympic Games
Para athletics
Gold medal – first place	1984 Stoke Mandeville/New York	Pentathlon B2
Bronze medal – third place	1984 Stoke Mandeville/New York	Shot put B2
Winter Paralympic Games
Para alpine skiing
Silver medal – second place	1988 Innsbruck	Giant slalom B2
Bronze medal – third place	1984 Innsbruck	Giant slalom B2
Bronze medal – third place	1988 Innsbruck	Downhill B2
Para biathlon
Silver medal – second place	1998 Nagano	7.5km B2-3
Silver medal – second place	1998 Nagano	3x2.5km relay open

Gabriele Berghofer (born 26 June 1963) is an Austrian Paralympic skier and athlete. She represented Austria in alpine skiing, Nordic skiing and athletics at both Winter and Summer Paralympic Games. She won a total of seven medals including one gold, three silver medals and three bronze medals.

== Career ==
She competed at the 1980 Summer Paralympics. She finished in fourth place in the pentathlon category B, with 4105 points,

She competed at the 1984 Summer Paralympics. Berghofer won a gold medal in the pentathlon with 2014 points, and a bronze medal in the shot put with the result of 7.35 m (behind Janet Rowley with 9.14 m and Michelle Message with 8.51 m .

At the 1984 Winter Paralympics, Berghofer finished third in the B2 giant slalom with a time of 3:09.74 (in 1st place Vivienne Martin who finished the race in 3: 02.85 and in 2nd place Connie Conley in 3: 09.45).

At the 1988 Winter Paralympics, in Innsbruck, she won a silver medal in the B2 giant slalom (with a realized time of 2:04.13), and a bronze medal in the B2 category downhill race in 0:54.28 (behind compatriots Elisabeth Kellner in 0: 53.24 and Edith Hoelzl in 0: 54.10 ).

At the 1998 Winter Paralympics, Berghofer also competed in Paralympic Nordic skiing, where she won two silver medals: in the 7.5 km race in the B2-3 category (on the podium, in 1st place Miyuki Kobayashi and in 3rd place Susanne Wohlmacher), and in the relay 3x2.5 km women's open, together with her companions Renata Hoenisch and Elisabeth Maxwald.
