= Doris Campbell =

Austrian cross-country skier

Sport
- Country: Austria
- Sport: Cross-country skiing
Medal record
Paralympic Games
| Gold medal – first place | 1984 Innsbruck | 4x5 km relay B1-2 |
| Bronze medal – third place | 1984 Innsbruck | 10 km B1 |

Doris Campbell is an Austrian cross-country skier. She represented Austria at the 1984 Winter Paralympics and at the 1988 Winter Paralympics. She won the gold medal in the women's 4x5 km relay B1-2 event at the 1984 Winter Paralympics and she also won the bronze medal in the women's middle distance 10 km B1 event.
