= Canada at the 1984 Winter Paralympics =

- Flag of Canada
- IPC code: CAN
- NPC: Canadian Paralympic Committee
- Website: www.paralympic.ca

in Innsbruck
- Competitors: 22
- Medals Ranked 10th: Gold 2 Silver 8 Bronze 4 Total 14

Winter Paralympics appearances (overview)
- 1976; 1980; 1984; 1988; 1992; 1994; 1998; 2002; 2006; 2010; 2014; 2018; 2022; 2026

Canada sent a delegation to compete at the 1984 Winter Paralympics, in Innsbruck, Austria.

Canada finished 10th in the gold medal and 7th in the total medal count.

== Medallists ==
Medal	Name	Sport	Event	Date
Gold	Mark Bentz	Alpine skiing	Men's downhill, B2	
Gold	Mark Bentz	Alpine skiing	Men's alpine combination, B2	
Silver	Lana Spreeman	Alpine skiing		
Silver	Lana Spreeman	Alpine skiing		
Silver	Lynda Chyzyk	Alpine skiing		
Silver	Uli Rompel	Alpine skiing		
Silver	Uli Rompel	Alpine skiing		
Silver	Rod Hersey	Alpine skiing		
Silver	Rod Hersey	Alpine skiing		
Silver	Wayne Burton	Alpine skiing		
Bronze	Lynda Chyzyk	Alpine skiing		
Bronze	Lynda Chyzyk	Alpine skiing		
Bronze	Wayne Burton	Alpine skiing		
Bronze	Murray Bedel	Alpine skiing		

== Classification ==
Each event had separate standing, sitting, or visually impaired classifications:

- LW2 - standing: single leg amputation above the knee
- LW 3 - standing: double leg amputation below the knee, mild cerebral palsy, or equivalent impairment
- LW4 - standing: single leg amputation below the knee
- LW5/7 - standing: double arm amputation
- LW6/8 - standing: single arm amputation
- LW9 - standing: amputation or equivalent impairment of one arm and one leg
- B1 - visually impaired: no functional vision
- B2 - visually impaired: up to ca 3-5% functional vision

== Alpine skiing ==
Women

Athlete	Event	Run 1 (SG)			Run 2 (Sl)			Final/Total		
Athlete	Event	Time	Diff	Rank	Time	Diff	Rank	Time	Diff	Rank
Lana Spreeman	Downhill, LW4		+			+			+	2nd place, silver medalist(s)
Lana Spreeman	Giant slalom, LW4		+			+			+	2nd place, silver medalist(s)
Lynda Chyzyk	Giant slalom, LW2		+			+			+	2nd place, silver medalist(s)
Lynda Chyzyk	Downhill, LW2		+			+			+	3rd place, bronze medalist(s)
Lynda Chyzyk	Alpine combination, LW2		+			+			+	3rd place, bronze medalist(s)

Men

Athlete	Event	Run 1 (SG)			Run 2 (Sl)			Final/Total		
Athlete	Event	Time	Diff	Rank	Time	Diff	Rank	Time	Diff	Rank
Mark Bentz	Downhill, B2		+			+			+	1st place, gold medalist(s)
Mark Bentz	Alpine combination, B2		+			+			+	1st place, gold medalist(s)
Uli Rompel	Downhill, B2		+			+			+	2nd place, silver medalist(s)
Uli Rompel	Alpine combination, B2		+			+			+	2nd place, silver medalist(s)
Rod Hersey	Giant slalom, B1		+			+			+	2nd place, silver medalist(s)
Rod Hersey	Alpine combination, B1		+			+			+	2nd place, silver medalist(s)
Wayne Burton	Slalom, LW1		+			+			+	2nd place, silver medalist(s)
Wayne Burton	Downhill, LW1		+			+			+	3rd place, bronze medalist(s)
Murray Bedel	Slalom, LW5/7		+			+			+	3rd place, bronze medalist(s)

== See also ==
- Canada at the 1984 Winter Olympics
- Canada at the Paralympics
