= Brad Hudiberg =

American para-alpine skier

Sport
- Country: United States
- Sport: Alpine skiing
Medal record
Paralympic Games
Silver medal – second place	1984 Innsbruck	Slalom LW9

Brad Hudiberg is an American para-alpine skier. He represented the United States at the 1984 Winter Paralympics held in Innsbruck, Austria in alpine skiing.

He won the silver medal at the Men's Slalom LW9 event.
