= Veronika Preining =

Austrian Paralympic skier (born 1965)

Personal information
- Full name: Veronika Preining-Breuer
- Born: 21 November 1965 (age 60)

Sport
- Country: Austria
- Sport: Alpine skiing Cross-country skiing
- Disability class: B1
Medal record
Representing Austria
Paralympic Games
Alpine skiing
Gold medal – first place	1984 Innsbruck	Downhill B1
Silver medal – second place	1984 Innsbruck	Alpine combination B1
Bronze medal – third place	1984 Innsbruck	Giant slalom B1
Cross-country skiing
Gold medal – first place	1988 Innsbruck	5km B1
Silver medal – second place	1988 Innsbruck	10km B1
Silver medal – second place	1988 Innsbruck	3x5km relay B1-3

Veronika Preining-Breuer (born 21 November 1965) is an Austrian Paralympic skier. She represented Austria in Para-Alpine skiing at the 1984 Paralympic Winter Games in Innsbruck and in Nordic skiing at the 1988 Paralympic Winter Games in Innsbruck. She won six medals, two gold, three silvers and a bronze.

== Career ==
At the 1984 Paralympic Winter Games in Innsbruck, she finished first in downhill in 2:06.14 (Sheila Holzworth finished the race in 2: 32.42 and Cara Dunne in 2:36.93). She won a silver medal in super combined B1 (with a realized time of 2:44.63), and bronze in the giant slalom race category B1 in 6:15.91.

At the 1988 Winter Paralympics, she won gold in the 5 km race in front of the Finnish athlete Kirsti Pennanen and the Russian Valentina Grigoryeva, the silver in the 10 km race, and the bronze in the 3x5 km event in category B1-3.

She competed at the 1990 World Nordic disabled championships, winning a gold medal, in 10 kilometers.
