= Glen Abramowski =

American para-alpine skier

Sport
- Country: United States
- Sport: Alpine skiing
Medal record
Paralympic Games
Silver medal – second place	1984 Innsbruck	Giant Slalom B2

Glen Abramowski is an American para-alpine skier. Diagnosed with a degenerative eye condition retinitis pigmentosa, he has been legally blind since birth.

He represented the United States at the 1984 Winter Paralympics in alpine skiing; he won the silver medal at the Men's Giant Slalom B2 event.

He won both a Silver and bronze medal at the 1982 World Disabled Ski Championships in Switzerland, and won three Gold and one silver medal at the 1990 World Disabled Ski Championships held at Winter Park in Colorado.

Graduating from the University of Colorado with a degree in aerospace engineering, Abramowski went on to become chairman of the board of directors for The Delta Gamma Center for Children with Visual Impairments in St. Louis, Missouri, where he spearheaded charity events for blind youth.

In 2019 he featured on an episode of podcast The Geoholics.

He continues to ski recreationally alongside his two children.
