= Marianne Reiter =

Austrian para-alpine skier

Sport
- Country: Austria
- Sport: Para-alpine skiing
Medal record
Paralympic Games
Gold medal – first place	1984 Innsbruck	Slalom LW2
Silver medal – second place	1984 Innsbruck	Downhill LW2

Marianne Reiter is an Austrian para-alpine skier. She represented Austria at the 1984 Winter Paralympics in Innsbruck, Austria.

She won one gold medal and one silver medal.

== Achievements ==
Year	Competition	Location	Position	Event	Time
1984	1984 Winter Paralympics	Innsbruck, Austria	1st	Women's Slalom LW2	1:29.43
1984	1984 Winter Paralympics	Innsbruck, Austria	2nd	Women's Downhill LW2	1:18.38

== See also ==
- List of Paralympic medalists in alpine skiing
