= Elisabeth Zerobin =

Austrian para-alpine skier

Sport
- Country: Austria
- Sport: Para-alpine skiing
Medal record
Paralympic Games
Bronze medal – third place	1984 Innsbruck	Alpine Combination LW4
Bronze medal – third place	1984 Innsbruck	Slalom LW4

Elisabeth Zerobin is an Austrian para-alpine skier. She represented Austria at the 1984 Winter Paralympics and won two bronze medals.

She won the bronze medal at the Women's Alpine Combination LW4 event and also at the Women's Slalom LW4 event.

She also competed at the Women's Downhill LW4 and Women's Giant Slalom LW4 events.

== See also ==
- List of Paralympic medalists in alpine skiing
