= 1984 Paralympics =

1984 Paralympics may refer to:

- 1984 Summer Paralympics
- 1984 Winter Paralympics
