= Austria at the Paralympics =

- IPC code: AUT
- NPC: Austrian Paralympic Committee
- Website: www.oepc.at (in German)
- Medals: Gold 222 Silver 248 Bronze 247 Total 717

Summer appearances
- 1960; 1964; 1968; 1972; 1976; 1980; 1984; 1988; 1992; 1996; 2000; 2004; 2008; 2012; 2016; 2020; 2024

Winter appearances
- 1976; 1980; 1984; 1988; 1992; 1994; 1998; 2002; 2006; 2010; 2014; 2018; 2022; 2026

Austria made its Paralympic Games début at the inaugural Paralympic Games in Rome in 1960, and has participated in every edition of both the Summer and Winter Paralympics. Austria was also the host of the 1984 and 1988 Winter Paralympics, both held in Innsbruck.

Austria's largest medal haul at the Summer Games came in 1976, with a total of 50. Its lowest came in 2024, with just four medals overall - the second time it had failed to obtain ten medals, the first being in 2008. At the Winter Games, Austria topped the medal table when it hosted the Games in 1984, with 70 medals; its lowest total was in 2018, with 7, and for the first time in history the country did not get a gold medal.

== Medals ==
=== Summer Paralympics ===
Event	Gold	Silver	Bronze	Total	Ranking
1960 Summer Paralympics	11	8	11	30	4
1964 Summer Paralympics	4	1	7	12	12
1968 Summer Paralympics	2	7	10	19	15
1972 Summer Paralympics	6	6	6	18	12
1976 Summer Paralympics	18	16	17	51	10
1980 Summer Paralympics	14	23	8	45	11
1984 Summer Paralympics	14	20	10	44	17
1988 Summer Paralympics	13	7	15	35	20
1992 Summer Paralympics	5	4	13	22	22
1996 Summer Paralympics	6	6	10	22	25
2000 Summer Paralympics	2	7	6	15	39
2004 Summer Paralympics	8	10	4	22	20
2008 Summer Paralympics	4	1	1	6	33
2012 Summer Paralympics	4	3	6	13	30
2016 Summer Paralympics	1	4	4	9	50
2020 Summer Paralympics	1	5	3	9	49
2024 Summer Paralympics	0	3	1	4	69
Total	113	128	131	372	17

=== Winter Paralympics ===
Event	Gold	Silver	Bronze	Total	Ranking
1976 Winter Paralympics	5	16	14	35	6
1980 Winter Paralympics	6	10	6	22	3
1984 Winter Paralympics	34	19	17	70	1
1988 Winter Paralympics	20	10	14	44	2
1992 Winter Paralympics	8	3	9	20	4
1994 Winter Paralympics	7	16	12	35	6
1998 Winter Paralympics	7	16	11	34	8
2002 Winter Paralympics	9	10	10	29	4
2006 Winter Paralympics	3	4	7	14	7
2010 Winter Paralympics	3	4	4	11	7
2014 Winter Paralympics	2	5	4	11	9
2018 Winter Paralympics	0	2	5	7	22
2022 Winter Paralympics	5	5	3	13	6
2026 Winter Paralympics	7	2	4	13	5
Total	116	122	120	358	3

=== Medals by Summer Sport ===
Games	Gold	Silver	Bronze	Total
Archery	3	2	1	6
Athletics	43	61	72	176
Canoeing	0	1	0	1
Cycling	7	12	5	24
Equestrian	2	1	1	4
Goalball	1	0	0	1
Judo	2	0	0	2
Lawn bowls	0	4	0	4
Paratriathlon	0	1	0	1
Powerlifting	0	1	0	1
Shooting	6	6	4	16
Swimming	19	13	17	49
Table tennis	29	23	29	81
Weightlifting	0	1	0	1
Total	112	126	129	367

=== Medals by Winter Sport ===
Games	Gold	Silver	Bronze	Total
Alpine skiing	101	95	97	293
Biathlon	0	4	0	4
Cross-country skiing	11	19	20	50
Snowboarding	0	1	0	1
Total	116	122	120	358

== Multi-medalists ==
Athletes who have won at least three gold medals or won a total of five or more medals of any colour.

=== Summer ===
No.	Athlete	Sport	Years	Games	Gender	Gold	Silver	Bronze	Total
1	Thomas Geierspichler	Athletics	2000-2020	6	M	6	8	4	18
2	Stanislaw Fraczyk	Table tennis	1996-2016	6	M	3	4	0	7
3	Andrea Scherney	Athletics	1996-2008	4	F	3	2	0	5
4	Rudolf Hajek	Table tennis	1988-2004	4	M	3	1	0	4
5	Wolfgang Eibeck	Cycling	1992-2016	7	M	2	5	0	7
6	Pepo Puch	Equestrian	2004-2024	6	M	2	2	1	5
7	Christoph Etzlstorfer	Athletics; Cycling	1984-2012	8	M	1	3	4	8
8	Hubert Aufschnaiter	Shooting	1988-2012	7	M	1	3	3	7

=== Winter ===
No.	Athlete	Sport	Years	Games	Gender	Gold	Silver	Bronze	Total
1	Josef Meusburger	Alpine skiing	1976-1988	3	M	6	2	0	8
2	Elisabeth Dos-Kellner	Alpine skiing	1988-1998	4	F	5	1	2	8
3	Danja Haslacher	Alpine skiing	1998-2006	3	F	5	0	1	6
4	Brigitte Madlener	Alpine skiing	1980-1984	2	F	4	2	0	6
5	Christine Winkler	Alpine skiing	1980-1984	2	F	3	3	0	6
6	Karl Preining	Alpine skiing	1984-1988	2	M	3	0	0	3
7	Claudia Lösch	Alpine skiing	2006-2014	3	F	2	3	2	7
8	Sabine Gasteiger	Alpine skiing	2006-2010	2	F	2	3	1	6
9	Johannes Aigner	Alpine skiing	2022	1	M	2	2	1	5
9	Gabriele Huemer	Alpine skiing	1994, 2002	2	F	2	2	1	5
11	Horst Morokutti	Alpine skiing Cross-country skiing	1976-1984	3	M	1	4	1	6
12	Juergen Egle	Alpine skiing	1998-2010	4	M	1	3	2	6

== See also ==
- Austria at the Olympics
