= Alpine skiing at the 1988 Winter Paralympics – Women's downhill LW2 =

Women's downhill LW2 at the IV Paralympic Winter Games
- Paralympic Alpine Skiing
- Venue: Innsbruck
- Dates: January 1988
- Competitors: 12 from 9 nations

Medalists
1st place, gold medalist(s)		Diana Golden	United States
2nd place, silver medalist(s)		Martha Hill	United States
3rd place, bronze medalist(s)		Annemie Schneider	West Germany

The women's downhill LW2 was one of the events held in Alpine skiing at the 1988 Winter Paralympics in Innsbruck.

There were 12 competitors in the final.

The United States' Diana Golden set a time of 1:23.90, taking the gold medal.

== Results ==
=== Final ===
Rank	Athlete	Time
1st place, gold medalist(s)	Diana Golden (USA)	1:23.90
2nd place, silver medalist(s)	Martha Hill (USA)	1:27.65
3rd place, bronze medalist(s)	Annemie Schneider (FRG)	1:29.18
4	Lynda Chyzyk (CAN)	1:29.51
5	Cathy Gentile (USA)	1:30.98
6	Helga Knapp (AUT)	1:31.62
7	Lorraine Te Punga (NZL)	1:43.93
8	Wendy Mason (GBR)	1:46.27
9	Tatsuko Matsumoto (JPN)	1:48.82
	Petra Hoellmueller (AUT)	DNS
	Erika Shaw (GBR)	DNF
	Virginie Lopez (FRA)	DNF
