= Alpine skiing at the 1988 Winter Paralympics – Men's downhill LW1 =

Men's downhill LW1 at the IV Paralympic Winter Games
- Paralympic Alpine Skiing
- Venue: Innsbruck
- Dates: January 1988
- Competitors: 5 from 4 nations

Medalists
1st place, gold medalist(s)		Dan Ashbaugh	United States
2nd place, silver medalist(s)		Mark Godfrey	United States
3rd place, bronze medalist(s)		Stephen Ellefson	Canada

The men's downhill LW1 was one of the events held in Alpine skiing at the 1988 Winter Paralympics in Innsbruck.

There were 6 competitors in the final.

The United States' Dan Ashbaugh set a time of 1:25.12, taking the gold medal. Since only three skiers finished, all three won a medal.

== Results ==
=== Final ===
Rank	Athlete	Time
1st place, gold medalist(s)	Dan Ashbaugh (USA)	1:25.12
2nd place, silver medalist(s)	Mark Godfrey (USA)	1:31.04
3rd place, bronze medalist(s)	Stephen Ellefson (CAN)	1:34.43
	Tsutomu Mino (JPN)	DNS
	Jose Bombillar Torres (ESP)	DNF
