= Michael Knaus =

Austrian para-alpine skier

Sport
- Country: Austria
- Sport: Para-alpine skiing
Medal record
Paralympic Games
| Silver medal – second place | 1984 Innsbruck | Slalom LW6/8 |

Michael Knaus is an Austrian para-alpine skier and director for the Paralympic division of ÖSV, the Austrian Skiing Federation. He represented Austria at the 1984 Winter Paralympics and he competed in three events in alpine skiing.

He won the silver medal at the Men's Slalom LW6/8 event. He also competed in the Men's Giant Slalom LW6/8 and Men's Downhill LW6/8 events but did not win a medal.

== See also ==
- List of Paralympic medalists in alpine skiing
