= Edith Hoelzl =

Austrian para-alpine skier

Sport
- Country: Austria
- Sport: Para-alpine skiing
Medal record
Paralympic Games
Gold medal – first place	1984 Innsbruck	Downhill B2
Gold medal – first place	1984 Innsbruck	Alpine Combination B2
Silver medal – second place	1988 Innsbruck	Downhill B2
Bronze medal – third place	1988 Innsbruck	Giant Slalom B2

Edith Hoelzl is an Austrian para-alpine skier. She represented Austria at the 1984 Winter Paralympics and at the 1988 Winter Paralympics. In total, she won two gold medals, one silver medal and one bronze medal.

== Achievements ==
Year	Competition	Location	Position	Event	Time
1984	1984 Winter Paralympics	Innsbruck, Austria	1st	Downhill B2	1:43.06
1984	1984 Winter Paralympics	Innsbruck, Austria	1st	Alpine Combination B2	0:37.46
1988	1988 Winter Paralympics	Innsbruck, Austria	2nd	Downhill B2	0:54.10
1988	1988 Winter Paralympics	Innsbruck, Austria	3rd	Giant Slalom B2	2:06.79

== See also ==
- List of Paralympic medalists in alpine skiing
