= Wayne Burton =

Canadian para-alpine skier

Sport
- Country: Canada
- Sport: Para-alpine skiing
Medal record
Paralympic Games
Silver medal – second place	1984 Innsbruck	Slalom LW1
Bronze medal – third place	1984 Innsbruck	Downhill LW1

Wayne Burton is a Canadian para-alpine skier. He represented Canada at the 1984 Winter Paralympics in alpine skiing. He won a silver medal in the Men's Slalom LW1 event and a bronze medal in the Men's Downhill LW1 event. He also competed in the Men's Giant Slalom LW1 event but did not finish.

== See also ==
- List of Paralympic medalists in alpine skiing
