= Murray Bedel =

Canadian para-alpine skier

Sport
- Country: Canada
- Sport: Para-alpine skiing
Medal record
Paralympic Games
Bronze medal – third place	1984 Innsbruck	Slalom LW5/7

Murray Bedel is a Canadian para-alpine skier. He represented Canada at the 1984 Winter Paralympics in alpine skiing.

He won the bronze medal in the Men's Slalom LW5/7 event.

He also competed in the Men's Downhill LW5/7 and Men's Giant Slalom LW5/7 events.

== See also ==
- List of Paralympic medalists in alpine skiing
