= Disabled skiing at the 1988 Winter Olympics =

Disabled skiing was a demonstration sport at the 1988 Winter Olympics. Contrary to the Paralympics, these events were demonstrations held during the Olympics.

== Medal table ==
Pos.	Country	1	2	3	Total
1	United States	1	2	1	4
2	Austria	1	0	1	2
2	Norway	1	0	1	2
4	West Germany	1	0	0	1
5	Finland	0	1	0	1
5	Sweden	0	1	0	1
7	Switzerland	0	0	1	1

== Men's event ==
=== Modified giant slalom for above-the-Knee Amputees ===
February 21, 1988

Place	Athlete	Score
1	Alexander Spitz (FRG)	1'21"10
2	Greg Mannino (USA)	1'22"87
3	Fritz Berger (SUI)	1'25"60

=== Cross country, 5 km (for blinds) ===
February 17, 1988

Place	Athlete	Score
1	Hans Anton Aalien (NOR)	18'51"2
	A. Homb (guide)	
2	Ake Petterson (SWE)	19'29"7
	R. Stridh (guide)	
3	Asmund Tveit (NOR)	19'48"6
	K. Ulvang (guide)	

== Women's event ==
=== Modified giant slalom for above-the-Knee Amputees ===
February 21, 1988

Place	Athlete	Score
1	Diana Golden (USA)	1'26"41
2	Cathy Gentile (USA)	1'32"86
3	Martha Hill (USA)	1'34"87

=== Cross country, 5 km (for blinds) ===
February 17, 1988

Place	Athlete	Score
1	Veronika Preining (AUT)	22'56"3
	S. Haberl (guide)	
2	Kirsti Pennanen (FIN)	23'00"1
	Viljaharju (guide)	
3	Margret Heger (AUT)	26'59"3
	M. Pucher (guide)	
