= Henryka Sadowska =

Polish cross-country skier

Sport
- Country: Poland
- Sport: Cross-country skiing
Medal record
Paralympic Games
Gold medal – first place	1984 Innsbruck	3x5 km relay LW2-9

Henryka Sadowska is a Polish cross-country skier. She represented Poland at the 1984 Winter Paralympics and she won the gold medal in the women's 3x5 km relay LW2-9 event.

She also competed in the women's short distance 5 km LW4 and women's middle distance 10 km LW4 events.
