= Laura Oftedahl =

American paralympic cross-country skier

Personal information
- Home town: Antioch, Illinois, U.S.
- Education: University of Illinois

Sport
- Country: United States
- Sport: Para cross-country skiing
- Disability: Blindness
- Disability class: B2
Medal record
Representing United States
Women's para cross-country skiing
Winter Paralympics
Silver medal – second place	1984 Innsbruck	Women's 4x5 km relay B1-2

Laura Oftedahl is an American former para cross-country skier who represented the United States at the 1984 and 1988 Winter Paralympics. She won a silver medal in the women's 4x5 km relay B1-2 for visually impaired skiers at the 1984 Winter Paralympics.

== Early and personal life ==
Oftedahl grew up in Antioch, Illinois. She was technically blind since birth, as she had only limited perception of light and shadows. She graduated from the University of Illinois and subsequently worked as a radio jockey in West Palm Beach, Florida, and Beloit, Wisconsin. In 1981, she moved to the Washington metropolitan area to work in public relations department of the American Council of the Blind.

Oftedahl took up cross-country skiing in 1980 after learning about the sporting opportunities for blind people from a Braille magazine. She was supported by Ski for Light, an organization which advocated for the physical fitness of blind and differently-able people. Prior to taking up skiing, she had not participated extensively in sports and was obese. She later credited the sport with improving her fitness. Apart from competing in sporting events, she was involved in promoting sporting opportunities for the blind. Oftedahl identifies as LGBTQ.

== Career ==
Oftedahl competed in the B2 classification for athletes with visual impairments and partial blindness.She adopted a practice regimen tailored to blind people often involving strength conditioning through running, stationary cycling, and indoor rowing machine. In 1982, she won her first national championship in the 5-kilometer para cross-country skiing event.

Oftedahl represented the United States at the 1984 Winter Paralympics in Innsbruck, Austria. She was part of the four member team that won the silver medal in the women's 4x5 km relay B1-2 for visually impaired skiers. She also took part in the individual 5-kilometer and 10-kilometer races, and was placed in 15th place in both the events.

In 1985, Oftedahl won gold medals in the 5-kilometer and 10-kilometer races at the National Blind Skiing Championships in Duluth, Minnesota, and qualified to represent the United States at the World Blind Skiing Championships. She was part of the three member women's cross-country skiing team of the United States at the 1988 Winter Paralympics held in Innsbruck. Competing in the women's 5 kilometer and 10 kilometer B2 events, she recorded personal-best Paralympic performances and finished tenth in both events. In March 1988, she won a gold medal in the 10-kilometer race, and silver medals in the 5-kolimeter and 15-kilometer races in the National Disabled Cross Country Championships.
