= Mark Bentz =

Canadian para-alpine skier

Sport
- Country: Canada
- Sport: Para-alpine skiing
Medal record
Paralympic Games
Gold medal – first place	1984 Innsbruck	Alpine Combination B2
Gold medal – first place	1984 Innsbruck	Downhill B2

Mark Bentz is a Canadian para-alpine skier, massage therapist and business owner. He represented Canada at the 1984 Winter Paralympics in alpine skiing.

He won the gold medal in the Men's Alpine Combination B2 event and also in the Men's Downhill B2 event.

He competed in the Men's Giant Slalom B2 event and finished in 7th place.

== Personal life ==
In 1995, Bentz became a registered massage therapist, graduating from the West Coast College of Massage Therapy. In 1997, Mark set up Everest Therapeutics, a massage therapy clinic. In 2005, he opened a multidisciplinary clinic, Electra Health, which houses Everest Therapeutics, with physiotherapists, chiropractors, acupuncturists, clinical counsellors and osteopaths.

Bentz lives in Vancouver, Canada with his family.

== See also ==
- List of Paralympic medalists in alpine skiing
