= Christian Haeusle =

Austrian para-alpine skier

Sport
- Country: Austria
- Sport: Para-alpine skiing
Medal record
Paralympic Games
| Silver medal – second place | 1984 Innsbruck | Downhill LW2 |

Christian Haeusle (born 1960) is an Austrian para-alpine skier. He represented Austria at the 1984 Winter Paralympics.

He won the silver medal at the Men's Downhill LW2 event.

He also competed at the Men's Giant Slalom LW2 and Men's Slalom LW2 events but did not win a medal.

== Private life ==
Haeusle lost a leg at the age of 13 in an accident involving a truck. Haeusle is an enthusiastic motorcyclist and he has taken part in motorcycle races.

== See also ==
- List of Paralympic medalists in alpine skiing
