= Karl Preining =

Austrian para-alpine skier

Sport
- Country: Austria
- Sport: Para-alpine skiing
Medal record
Paralympic Games
| Gold medal – first place | 1984 Innsbruck | Alpine Combination B1 |
| Gold medal – first place | 1984 Innsbruck | Downhill B1 |
| Gold medal – first place | 1984 Innsbruck | Giant Slalom B1 |

Karl Preining is an Austrian para-alpine skier. He represented Austria at the 1984 Winter Paralympics and at the 1988 Winter Paralympics.

In 1984, he won three gold medals in alpine skiing: in the Men's Alpine Combination B1 event, in the Men's Downhill B1 event and in the Men's Giant Slalom B1 event.

== See also ==
- List of Paralympic medalists in alpine skiing
