= Peter Kieweg =

Austrian Paralympic athlete

Sport
- Country: Austria
- Sport: Para-athletics; Paralympic cross-country skiing
Medal record
Paralympic Games
Bronze medal – third place	1984 Innsbruck	Middle Distance 10 km LW9
Bronze medal – third place	1984 Innsbruck	Short Distance 5 km LW9
Bronze medal – third place	1984 Stoke Mandeville	Shot Put A9

Peter Kieweg is an Austrian Paralympic athlete. He competed at both the 1984 Summer Paralympics and the 1984 Winter Paralympics.

In total, he won one bronze medal in athletics and two bronze medals in cross-country skiing.
