= Jack Benedick =

American para-alpine skier (1943–2013)

Personal information
- Born: 1943
- Died: 2013 (aged 69–70)

Sport
- Country: United States
- Sport: Para-alpine skiing
Medal record
Paralympic Games
Silver medal – second place	1984 Innsbruck	Alpine combination LW3

Jack Benedick (1943 – 19 March 2013) was an American para-alpine skier. He represented the United States at the 1980 Winter Paralympics in Geilo, Norway and at the 1984 Winter Paralympics in Innsbruck, Austria. He won the silver medal in the men's alpine combination LW3 event at the 1984 Winter Paralympics. He was inducted in the U.S. Ski & Snowboard Hall of Fame in 2009.

In 1969, he lost both his legs in Vietnam. In 2006, he was the recipient of one of the Paralympic Order awards of 2005. He died on 19 March 2013.

== See also ==
- List of Paralympic medalists in alpine skiing
