= Rod Hersey =

Canadian para-alpine skier

Sport
- Country: Canada
- Sport: Para-alpine skiing
Medal record
Paralympic Games
Silver medal – second place	1984 Innsbruck	Giant Slalom B1
Silver medal – second place	1984 Innsbruck	Alpine Combination B1

Rod Hersey is a Canadian para-alpine skier. He represented Canada at the 1984 Winter Paralympics in alpine skiing.

He won the silver medal in the Men's Giant Slalom B1 event and in the Men's Alpine Combination B1 event.

He also competed in the Men's Downhill B1 and finished in 4th place.

== See also ==
- List of Paralympic medalists in alpine skiing
