= David Jamison (skier) =

American para-alpine skier

Sport
- Country: United States
- Sport: Para-alpine skiing
Medal record
Paralympic Games
Silver medal – second place	1988 Innsbruck	Slalom LW2
Bronze medal – third place	1984 Innsbruck	Slalom LW2

David Jamison is an American para-alpine skier. He represented the United States at the 1984 Winter Paralympics and at the 1988 Winter Paralympics in alpine skiing.

He won the bronze medal at the Men's Slalom LW2 event in 1984 and the silver medal at the same event in 1988.

He also represented the United States at the Men's giant slalom for single-leg amputees event in disabled skiing, a demonstration sport at the 1984 Winter Olympics.
