= Connie Conley =

American para-alpine skier

Sport
- Country: United States
- Sport: Alpine skiing
Medal record
Paralympic Games
Silver medal – second place	1984 Innsbruck	Giant Slalom B2
Bronze medal – third place	1984 Innsbruck	Downhill B2
Bronze medal – third place	1984 Innsbruck	Alpine Combination B2

Connie Conley is an American para-alpine skier. She represented the United States at the 1984 Winter Paralympics in alpine skiing. She won a medal in each event that she competed in.

She won the silver medal in the Women's Giant Slalom B2 event and the bronze medals at the Women's Downhill B2 event and Women's Alpine Combination B2 event.

== See also ==
- List of Paralympic medalists in alpine skiing
