= Mike May (skier) =

American para-alpine skier (born 1953)

Personal information
- Full name: Michael G. May
- Born: 1953 (age 72–73)

Sport
- Country: United States
- Sport: Para-alpine skiing
- Disability class: B1
Medal record
Paralympic Games
Bronze medal – third place	1984 Innsbruck	Downhill B1
Bronze medal – third place	1984 Innsbruck	Giant slalom B1
Bronze medal – third place	1984 Innsbruck	Alpine combination B1

Michael G. May (born 1953) is an American business executive, skier and enthusiast of other sports who was blinded by a chemical explosion at the age of three, but regained partial vision in 2000, at the age of 46, after cornea transplants and a pioneering stem cell procedure by San Francisco ophthalmologist Daniel Goodman. In 1999, May founded the Sendero Group in Davis, California, United States, which employs many individuals who are blind or visually impaired. Sendero has assisted those with sight disabilities by producing the first accessible GPS solution for blind persons. The Sendero Group's GPS technology received the Consumer Electronics Show's "Innovation Honoree" title in 2004 and 2009.

Among his many accomplishments, May holds the record for downhill skiing by a person who is completely blind (racing at 65 mph). He competed in the alpine skiing event at the 1984 Winter Paralympics and won three bronze medals in the downhill, giant slalom, and combination events.

== Restoration of sight ==
In 2003, three years after May's eye operation, the results were mixed. May was unable to grasp three-dimensional vision or recognize members of his family by their faces alone.

Siu and Morley (2008) propose that following seven days of visual deprivation, a potential decrease in vision may occur. They also found an increasing degree of visual impairment following thirty-day and 120-day periods of deprivation. The Siu and Morley study suggests that the function of the brain is dependent upon visual input. The effect of visual loss affects the development of the visual cortex of the brain—the visual impairment causes the occipital lobe to lose its sensitivity in perceiving spatial processing.

May lost his eyesight at the age of three when his vision was not fully developed; he was unable yet to distinguish shapes, drawings, or images clearly. Consequently, it was anticipated that he would experience difficulty describing the outside world in comparison to a normal-sighted person, for example, it would be difficult for May to differentiate between complex shapes, dimensions, and the orientation of objects. Hannan (2006) hypothesized that the temporal visual cortex uses prior memory and experiences to make sense of shapes, colors, and forms. Hannan proposed that the long-term effect of blindness in the visual cortex is an inability to recognize spatial cues. Cohen et al. (1997) suggest that early blindness causes poor development of the visual cortex, with a resulting decrease in somatosensory development. Cohen's study proposes that May's long term blindness affects his ability to distinguish between faces of males and females, and to recognize pictures and images. In spite of the surgery on May's right eye, his regained vision is not fully recovered after forty years of blindness. Thinus-Blanc and Gaunet (1997) suggest that people who are blind early in life show a limited ability in the area of spatial representation. May's early blindness resulted in visual cortex cells unaccustomed to the new stimuli in his surroundings.

Cohen et al. (1997) propose that, during their early years, blinded subjects develop a strong inclination for tactile discrimination tasks. May has developed very precise senses of hearing and touch.

== Personal life ==
May and his ex-wife, Jennifer, had two sons, Carson and Wyndham. Carson died while skiing, likely due to an avalanche, in January 2016.

== Biography ==
In 2006, journalist Robert Kurson wrote a book on May that was expanded from an article Kurson wrote for Esquire magazine. The book, Crashing Through: A True Story of Risk, Adventure and the Man Who Dared to See, was released on May 15, 2007.

== Film adaptation ==
Interest was expressed within the film industry regarding the translation of May's story into a motion picture, and, as of July 2011, Stone Village Productions and DRO Entertainment owned the rights to the film adaptation of Kurson's book. Emmy Award-winning screenwriter, Adam Mazer, had been employed to write the script.

== See also ==
- Acquired vision
