= Martha Hill (skier) =

American para-alpine skier

Personal information
- Born: April 28, 1960 Lake Forest, Illinois, U.S.

Sport
- Country: United States
- Sport: Para-alpine skiing
Medal record
Paralympic Games
Silver medal – second place	1988 Innsbruck	Downhill LW2
Silver medal – second place	1988 Innsbruck	Slalom LW2
Olympic Games
Bronze medal – third place	1988 Calgary	Disabled Giant Slalom LW2

Martha Hill is an American para-alpine skier. She represented the United States at the 1984 Winter Paralympics, at the 1988 Winter Paralympics, and at the 1988 Calgary Winter Olympics where disabled skiing was a demonstration sport.

She is also the mother of Stacy Gaskill who represented the United States at the 2022 and 2026 Winter Olympics.

== Skiing career ==
Hill raced in para-alpine skiing from 1983 to 1988 in the LW2 category for athletes missing a lower limb above the knee.

At the 1984 Winter Paralympics, she finished fourth in downhill, fifth in super combined, and sixth, both in slalom, and giant slalom.

At the 1988 Winter Paralympics, she won the silver medals in the Women's Downhill LW2 event and in the Women's Slalom LW2 event.

At the 1988 Calgary Winter Olympics, she won a bronze medal in the Disabled Giant Slalom LW2 demonstration event. Commenting on this event, she said, “When we raced in Calgary we were representing not only the United States but all people with disabilities.”

== Television ==
Hill starred in the 1988 educational television program 'The Second Voyage of the Mimi' where she played the character Pepper Thornton.
