= Jean-Pierre Kurth =

Swiss para-alpine skier (born 1957)

Sport
- Country: Switzerland
- Sport: Handisport skiing
Medal record
Paralympic Games
Bronze medal – third place	1984 Innsbruck	Giant Slalom B2

Jean-Pierre Kurth was born on February 20, 1957, in Porrentruy, canton of Jura and resides in Verbier, canton of Valais. He is a handisport skier. He represented Switzerland at the 1984 Winter Paralympics, where he competed in alpine skiing.

He won several gold medals with Guy Dériaz as guide at the 1982 Winter sport world championship in the Alpes vaudoises, including the gold medal in the Giant Slalom B2, the Downhill B2, and the Combined B2. (B2 is the category for the visually impaired).

In 1984, he competed at the Winter Paralympics in Innsbruck with Guy Dériaz as guide. He won the bronze medal in the Giant Slalom B2 event.

Mountaineer with 14 peaks over 4000 meters, he managed to ski down 8 of them.

Thanks to all the guides and people who accompanied him.

== See also ==
- List of Paralympic medalists in alpine skiing
