= Uli Rompel =

Canadian para-alpine skier (born 1944)

Personal information
- Nationality: Canadian
- Citizenship: Canadian
- Born: 25 June 1944 (age 82) Teschen, Czech Republic

Sport
- Country: Canada
- Sport: Alpine Skiing
Medal record
Alpine Skiing
Representing Canada
Paralympic Games
Silver medal – second place	1984 Innsbruck	Men's Downhill B2
Silver medal – second place	1984 Innsbruck	Men's Alpine Combination B2
Silver medal – second place	1988 Innsbruck	Men's Downhill B3
Silver medal – second place	1988 Innsbruck	Men's Giant Slalom B3

Uli Rompel (born June 25, 1944, in Teschen, Czech Republic) is a Canadian Paralympic skier. He competed in alpine skiing in the 1984 and 1988 Winter Paralympics, winning four silver medals.
