= Marianne Kriegl =

Austrian cross-country skier

Sport
- Country: Austria
- Sport: Cross-country skiing
Medal record
Paralympic Games
Gold medal – first place	1984 Innsbruck	4x5 km relay B1-2

Marianne Kriegl is an Austrian cross-country skier. She represented Austria at the 1984 Winter Paralympics held in Innsbruck, Austria and she won the gold medal in the women's 4x5 km relay B1-2 event, the only event she participated in.
