= Christine Winkler =

Austrian para-alpine skier

Sport
- Country: Austria
- Sport: Para-alpine skiing
Medal record
Paralympic Games
| Silver medal – second place | 1980 Geilo | Slalom 1A |
| Silver medal – second place | 1980 Geilo | Giant Slalom 1A |
| Silver medal – second place | 1984 Innsbruck | Slalom LW2 |
| Gold medal – first place | 1984 Innsbruck | Giant Slalom LW2 |
| Gold medal – first place | 1984 Innsbruck | Downhill LW2 |
| Gold medal – first place | 1984 Innsbruck | Alpine Combination LW2 |

Christine Winkler is an Austrian para-alpine skier. She represented Austria at the 1980 Winter Paralympics and at the 1984 Winter Paralympics. She competed in three events in 1980 and in three events in 1984. She won a medal in each event; in total, she won three gold medals and three silver medals.

== Achievements ==
| Year | Competition | Location | Position | Event | Time |
|---|---|---|---|---|---|
| 1980 | 1980 Winter Paralympics | Geilo, Norway | 2nd | Women's Slalom 1A | 1:29.56 |
| 1980 | 1980 Winter Paralympics | Geilo, Norway | 2nd | Women's Giant Slalom 1A | 2:48.10 |
| 1984 | 1984 Winter Paralympics | Innsbruck, Austria | 2nd | Women's Slalom LW2 | 1:32.12 |
| 1984 | 1984 Winter Paralympics | Innsbruck, Austria | 1st | Women's Giant Slalom LW2 | 1:38.57 |
| 1984 | 1984 Winter Paralympics | Innsbruck, Austria | 1st | Women's Downhill LW2 | 1:17.66 |
| 1984 | 1984 Winter Paralympics | Innsbruck, Austria | 1st | Women's Alpine Combination LW2 | 0:23.10 |

== See also ==
- List of Paralympic medalists in alpine skiing
