= Rod Hernley =

American para-alpine skier

Sport
- Country: United States
- Sport: Alpine skiing
Medal record
Paralympic Games
Bronze medal – third place	1984 Innsbruck	Slalom LW1

Rod Hernley is an American para-alpine skier. He represented the United States at the 1984 Winter Paralympics in Innsbruck, Austria in alpine skiing.

He won the bronze medal at the Men's Slalom LW1 event.
