= Mark Godfrey =

American para-alpine skier

Sport
- Country: United States
- Sport: Alpine skiing
Medal record
Paralympic Games
Silver medal – second place	1988 Innsbruck	Downhill LW1
Silver medal – second place	1988 Innsbruck	Giant Slalom LW1
Silver medal – second place	1988 Innsbruck	Slalom LW1

Mark Godfrey is an American para-alpine skier. He represented the United States at the 1988 Winter Paralympics in alpine skiing.

He won the silver medal in three events: in the Men's Downhill LW1 event, the Men's Giant Slalom LW1 event and the Men's Slalom LW1 event.
