= Lynda Chyzyk =

Canadian para-alpine skier

Sport
- Country: Canada
- Sport: Para-alpine skiing
Medal record
Paralympic Games
Gold medal – first place	1988 Innsbruck	Slalom LW2
Bronze medal – third place	1984 Innsbruck	Alpine Combination LW2
Bronze medal – third place	1984 Innsbruck	Downhill LW2
Silver medal – second place	1984 Innsbruck	Giant Slalom LW2

Lynda Chyzyk is a Canadian para-alpine skier. She represented Canada at the 1984 Winter Paralympics and at the 1988 Winter Paralympics. In total she won one gold medal, one silver medal and two bronze medals.

In 1984, she won the silver medal in the Women's Giant Slalom LW2 event and the bronze medals in the Women's Downhill LW2 and the Women's Alpine Combination LW2 events. In 1988, she won one more medal: the gold medal in the Women's Slalom LW2 event. She also competed in the Women's Downhill LW2 event and finished in 4th place.

== See also ==
- List of Paralympic medalists in alpine skiing
