= Dan Ashbaugh =

American para-alpine skier

Sport
- Country: United States
- Sport: Alpine skiing
Medal record
Paralympic Games
Gold medal – first place	1988 Innsbruck	Downhill LW1
Gold medal – first place	1988 Innsbruck	Giant Slalom LW1
Gold medal – first place	1988 Innsbruck	Slalom LW1

Dan Ashbaugh is an American para-alpine skier. He represented the United States at the 1988 Winter Paralympics in alpine skiing. He competed in three events and he won the gold medal in each event: in the Men's Downhill LW1 event, the Men's Giant Slalom LW1 event and the Men's Slalom LW1 event.
