= Kathy Poohachof =

American para-alpine skier

Sport
- Country: United States
- Sport: Para-alpine skiing
Medal record
Paralympic Games
Silver medal – second place	1980 Geilo	Giant slalom 3A
Silver medal – second place	1984 Innsbruck	Downhill LW6/8
Silver medal – second place	1984 Innsbruck	Giant slalom LW6/8
Silver medal – second place	1984 Innsbruck	Slalom LW6/8
Silver medal – second place	1984 Innsbruck	Alpine combination LW6/8

Kathy Poohachof is a retired American para-alpine skier. She represented the United States at the 1980 Winter Paralympics in Geilo, Norway and at the 1984 Winter Paralympics in Innsbruck, Austria. In total, she won five silver medals in alpine skiing.

== See also ==
- List of Paralympic medalists in alpine skiing
