= Poland at the 1984 Winter Paralympics =

- IPC code: POL
- NPC: Polish Paralympic Committee
- Website: www.paralympic.org.pl

in Innsbruck
- Competitors: 16 in 2 sports
- Medals Ranked 9th: Gold 3 Silver 2 Bronze 8 Total 13

Winter Paralympics appearances (overview)
- 1976; 1980; 1984; 1988; 1992; 1994; 1998; 2002; 2006; 2010; 2014; 2018; 2022; 2026

Poland competed at the 1984 Winter Paralympics in Innsbruck, Austria. 16 competitors from Poland won 13 medals and finished 9th in the medal table.

== Medalists ==
=== Gold ===
- Marian Niedzwiadek - Cross-country skiing, Standing 5 km Individual Classic LW3
- Marian Niedzwiadek - Cross-country skiing, Standing 10 km Individual Free LW3
- Barbara Chmielecka, Jolanta Kochanaowska, Henryka Sadowska - Cross-country skiing, Standing 3 x 5 km Relay LW2-9

=== Silver ===
- Kazimierz Wyszowski - Cross-country skiing, Standing 5 km Individual Classic LW3
- Kazimierz Wyszowski - Cross-country skiing, Standing 10 km Individual Free LW3

=== Bronze ===
- Elżbieta Dadok - Alpine skiing, Slalom LW6/8
- Elżbieta Dadok - Alpine skiing, giant slalom LW6/8
- Elżbieta Dadok - Alpine skiing, Alpine Combination LW6/8
- Franciszek Tracz - Alpine skiing, Slalom LW3
- Barbara Chmielecka - Cross-country skiing, Standing 5 km Individual Classic LW6/8
- Barbara Chmielecka - Cross-country skiing, Standing 10 km Individual Free LW6/8
- Czesław Kwiatkowski - Cross-country skiing, Standing 5 km Individual Classic LW3
- Czesław Kwiatkowski - Cross-country skiing, Standing 10 km Individual Free LW3

== Alpine skiing ==
Athlete	Event	Final			
Athlete	Event	Run	Rank	Calculated Time	Rank
Elżbieta Dadok	Slalom LW6/8	1:22.81	3	1:22.81	3rd place, bronze medalist(s)
Elżbieta Dadok	Giant slalom LW6/8	1:37.12	3	1:37.12	3rd place, bronze medalist(s)
Elżbieta Dadok	Downhill LW6/8	1:17.65	4	1:17.65	4
Elżbieta Dadok	Alpine Combination LW6/8	3:47.19	3	3:47.19	3rd place, bronze medalist(s)
Henryk Gruszczyński	Slalom LW6/8	1:25.51	8	1:25.51	8
Henryk Gruszczyński	Giant slalom LW6/8	1:49.23	15	1:49.23	15
Henryk Gruszczyński	Downhill LW6/8	1:12.82	13	1:12.82	13
Henryk Gruszczyński	Alpine Combination LW6/8	9:37.61	7	9:37.61	7
Bogdan Kawka	Slalom LW6/8	1:47.83	11	1:47.83	11
Bogdan Kawka	Giant slalom LW6/8	1:51.07 1	16	1:51.07	16
Franciszek Tracz	Slalom LW3	1:43.64	3	1:43.64	3rd place, bronze medalist(s)
Franciszek Tracz	Giant slalom LW3	DQ		DNF	
Franciszek Tracz	Downhill LW3	DNS		DNF	

== Cross‑country skiing ==
Athlete	Event	Final	
Athlete	Event	Finish Time	Rank
Barbara Chmielecka	Standing 5 km Classic LW6/8	26:35.0	3rd place, bronze medalist(s)
Barbara Chmielecka	Standing 10 km Free LW6/8	0:51:00.4	3rd place, bronze medalist(s)
Marian Damian	Standing 10 km Classic LW6/8	40:04.1	13
Marian Damian	Standing 20 km Free LW6/8	1:22:03.3	9
Jolanta Kochanaowska	Standing 5 km Classic LW4	29:30.6	7
Jolanta Kochanaowska	Standing 10 km Free LW4	0:59:19.7	7
Czesław Kwiatkowski	Standing 5 km Classic LW3	35:59.2	3rd place, bronze medalist(s)
Czesław Kwiatkowski	Standing 10 km Free LW3	1:00:52.9	3rd place, bronze medalist(s)
Marian Niedzwiadek	Standing 5 km Classic LW3	24:47.7	1st place, gold medalist(s)
Marian Niedzwiadek	Standing 10 km Free LW3	0:52:43.5	1st place, gold medalist(s)
Andrzej Pietrzyk	Standing 10 km Classic LW6/8	36:57.7	8
Andrzej Pietrzyk	Standing 20 km Free LW6/8	1:15:26.3	4
Ryszard Przednówek	Standing 5 km Classic LW2	23:45.0	8
Ryszard Przednówek	Standing 10 km Free LW2	0:45:43.3	7
Henryka Sadowska	Standing 5 km Classic LW4	28:37.4	5
Henryka Sadowska	Standing 10 km Free LW4	0:57:10.6	6
Stefan Sroka	Standing 5 km Classic LW5/7	29:47.3	7
Stefan Sroka	Standing 10 km Free LW5/7	0:52:52.5	7
Krzysztof Struś	Standing 5 km Classic LW4	20:45.9	17
Krzysztof Struś	Standing 10 km Free L4	0:42:15.0	15
Kazimierz Suchocki	Standing 5 km Classic LW4	17:56.0	11
Kazimierz Suchocki	Standing 10 km Free LW4	0:37:45.6	10
Kazimierz Wyszowski	Standing 5 km Classic LW3	27:04.8	2nd place, silver medalist(s)
Kazimierz Wyszowski	Standing 10 km Free LW3	0:56:30.7	2nd place, silver medalist(s)
Barbara Chmielecka; Jolanta Kochanaowska; Henryka Sadowska	3 x 5 km Relay Standing LW2-9	1:14:18.0	1st place, gold medalist(s)
Marian Damian; Andrzej Pietrzyk; Krzysztof Struś; Kazimierz Suchocki	4 x 5 km Relay Standing LW2-9	1:10:06.4	5

== See also ==
- Poland at the Paralympics
- Poland at the 1984 Winter Olympics
