= Kevin O'Sullivan (skier) =

New Zealand para-alpine skier

Personal information
- Nationality: New Zealand
Medal record
Men's para alpine skiing
Representing New Zealand
Paralympic Games
Gold medal – first place	1998 Nagano	Super-G LW1,3,5/7
Bronze medal – third place	1994 Lillehammer	Slalom LW1/3

Kevin O'Sullivan is a Paralympic medalist from New Zealand who competed in alpine skiing. He competed in the 1994 Winter Paralympics where he won a bronze medal in the Slalom, and in the 1998 Winter Paralympics where he won a gold medal in the Super-G.
