= Austria at the 1984 Winter Paralympics =

- IPC code: AUT
- NPC: Austrian Paralympic Committee

in Innsbruck, Austria
- Competitors: 59 (42 men and 17 women) in 3 sports
- Medals Ranked 1st: Gold 34 Silver 19 Bronze 17 Total 70

Winter Paralympics appearances (overview)
- 1976; 1980; 1984; 1988; 1992; 1994; 1998; 2002; 2006; 2010; 2014; 2018; 2022; 2026

Austria competed at the 1984 Winter Paralympics in Innsbruck, Austria. 59 competitors from Austria won 70 medals including 34 gold, 19 silver and 17 bronze and finished 1st in the medal table.

== Alpine skiing ==
The medalists are:

- (gold) Rainer Bergmann, Men's Alpine Combination LW2
- (gold) Rainer Bergmann, Men's Downhill LW2
- (gold) Rainer Bergmann, Men's Giant Slalom LW2
- (gold) Helmut Falch, Men's Alpine Combination LW1
- (gold) Helmut Falch, Men's Downhill LW1
- (gold) Helmut Falch, Men's Giant Slalom LW1
- (gold) Helmut Falch, Men's Slalom LW1
- (gold) Odo Habermann, Men's Giant Slalom B2
- (gold) Edith Hoelzl, Women's Alpine Combination B2
- (gold) Edith Hoelzl, Women's Downhill B2
- (gold) Brigitte Madlener, Women's Alpine Combination LW5/7
- (gold) Brigitte Madlener, Women's Downhill LW5/7
- (gold) Brigitte Madlener, Women's Giant Slalom LW5/7
- (gold) Josef Meusburger, Men's Alpine Combination LW4
- (gold) Josef Meusburger, Men's Giant Slalom LW4
- (gold) Josef Meusburger, Men's Slalom LW4
- (gold) Karl Preining, Men's Alpine Combination B1
- (gold) Karl Preining, Men's Downhill B1
- (gold) Karl Preining, Men's Giant Slalom B1
- (gold) Veronika Preining, Women's Downhill B1
- (gold) Markus Ramsauer, Men's Downhill LW4
- (gold) Marianne Reiter, Women's Slalom LW2
- (gold) Dietmar Schweninger, Men's Giant Slalom LW6/8
- (gold) Christine Winkler, Women's Alpine Combination LW2
- (gold) Christine Winkler, Women's Downhill LW2
- (gold) Christine Winkler, Women's Giant Slalom LW2
- (silver) Rainer Bergmann, Men's Slalom LW2
- (silver) Christian Haeusle, Men's Downhill LW2
- (silver) Michael Knaus, Men's Slalom LW6/8
- (silver) Gerhard Langer, Men's Slalom LW3
- (silver) Brigitte Madlener, Women's Slalom LW5/7
- (silver) Josef Meusburger, Men's Downhill LW4
- (silver) Peter Perner, Men's Alpine Combination LW2
- (silver) Veronika Preining, Women's Alpine Combination B1
- (silver) Marianne Reiter, Women's Downhill LW2
- (silver) Christine Winkler, Women's Slalom LW2
- (bronze) Gabriele Berghofer, Women's Giant Slalom B2
- (bronze) Gerlinde Dullnig, Women's Downhill LW6/8
- (bronze) August Hofer, Men's Downhill B2
- (bronze) Gerhard Langer, Men's Alpine Combination LW3
- (bronze) Gerhard Langer, Men's Giant Slalom LW3
- (bronze) Peter Perner, Men's Giant Slalom LW2
- (bronze) Veronika Preining, Women's Giant Slalom B1
- (bronze) Markus Ramsauer, Men's Slalom LW4
- (bronze) Dietmar Schweninger, Men's Downhill LW6/8
- (bronze) Meinhard Tatschl, Men's Giant Slalom LW6/8
- (bronze) Elisabeth Zerobin, Women's Alpine Combination LW4
- (bronze) Elisabeth Zerobin, Women's Slalom LW4

== Cross-country ==
The medalists are:

- (gold) Doris Campbell, Margaret Heger, Renata Hoenisch, Marianne Kriegl Women's 4x5 km Relay B1-2
- (gold) Hildegard Fetz, Women's Middle Distance 5 km grade II
- (gold) Hildegard Fetz, Women's Short Distance 2.5 km grade II
- (gold) Georg Freund, Men's Middle Distance 10 km grade II
- (gold) Georg Freund, Siegwald Mussger, Reinhold Sager Men's 3x2.5 km Relay grade I-II
- (gold) Georg Freund, Men's Short Distance 5 km grade II
- (gold) Reinhold Sager, Men's Middle Distance 10 km grade I
- (gold) Reinhold Sager, Men's Short Distance 5 km grade I
- (silver) Hermann Gaun, Josef Siebenhofer, Reinhold Wessely Men's 3x2.5 km Relay grade I-II
- (silver) Margaret Heger, Women's Middle Distance 10 km B1
- (silver) Margaret Heger, Women's Short Distance 5 km B1
- (silver) Horst Morokutti, Men's Middle Distance 10 km LW5/7
- (silver) Siegwald Mussger, Men's Middle Distance 10 km grade II
- (silver) Siegwald Mussger, Men's Short Distance 5 km grade II
- (silver) Johanna Ratzinger, Women's Middle Distance 5 km grade II
- (silver) Johanna Ratzinger, Women's Short Distance 2.5 km grade II
- (bronze) Doris Campbell, Women's Middle Distance 10 km B1
- (bronze) Renata Hoenisch, Women's Middle Distance 10 km B2
- (bronze) Peter Kieweg, Men's Middle Distance 10 km LW9
- (bronze) Peter Kieweg, Men's Short Distance 5 km LW9
- (bronze) Horst Morokutti, Men's Short Distance 5 km LW5/7

== Ice sledge speed racing ==
One athlete won a medal:

- (silver) Reinhold Wessely Men's 1500 m grade II

== See also ==
- Austria at the Paralympics
- Austria at the 1984 Winter Olympics
