= Reinhild Möller =

German paralympic competitor

Personal information
- Born: February 24, 1956 (age 70) Schwalm-Eder-Kreis, West Germany

Skiing career
- Sport: Alpine skiing
- Disciplines: Slalom, giant slalom, super-G, Downhill, Combined

Paralympics
- Medals: 23 (19 gold)
Medal record
Women's alpine skiing
Representing Germany
Paralympic Games
Gold medal – first place	1992 Tignes-Albertville	Super-G
Gold medal – first place	1992 Tignes-Albertville	Slalom
Gold medal – first place	1992 Tignes-Albertville	Giant slalom
Gold medal – first place	1992 Tignes-Albertville	Downhill
Gold medal – first place	1994 Lillehammer	Super-G
Gold medal – first place	1994 Lillehammer	Slalom
Gold medal – first place	1994 Lillehammer	Giant slalom
Gold medal – first place	1994 Lillehammer	Downhill
Gold medal – first place	1998 Nagano	Super-G
Gold medal – first place	1998 Nagano	Slalom
Silver medal – second place	2006 Torino	Downhill
Representing West Germany
Gold medal – first place	1984 Innsbruck	Alpine combination
Gold medal – first place	1984 Innsbruck	Giant slalom
Gold medal – first place	1984 Innsbruck	Downhill
Gold medal – first place	1988 Innsbruck	Slalom
Gold medal – first place	1988 Innsbruck	Giant slalom
Gold medal – first place	1988 Innsbruck	Downhill
Silver medal – second place	1984 Innsbruck	Slalom
Bronze medal – third place	1980 Geilo	Slalom
Women's athletics
Representing Germany
Gold medal – first place	1988 Seoul	200m
Silver medal – second place	1988 Seoul	100m
Representing West Germany
Gold medal – first place	1984 Stoke Mandeville/New York	400m
Gold medal – first place	1984 Stoke Mandeville/New York	100m

Reinhild Möller (born February 24, 1956, in Schwalm-Eder-Kreis) is a German former alpine ski racer.

She is the only alpine skier to win 19 Paralympic medals. She has also won 4 Paralympic medals in athletics.

When she was 3 years old, she lost half of her left leg in a farm accident. She has lived in the United States since about 1990. She is married to U.S. Paralympic skier Reed Robinson. Möller is the first athlete with a disability to receive a $1 million sponsorship contract.
