= Austria at the 1988 Winter Paralympics =

- IPC code: AUT
- NPC: Austrian Paralympic Committee

in Innsbruck, Austria
- Competitors: 52 (37 men and 15 women) in 4 sports
- Medals Ranked 2nd: Gold 20 Silver 10 Bronze 14 Total 44

Winter Paralympics appearances (overview)
- 1976; 1980; 1984; 1988; 1992; 1994; 1998; 2002; 2006; 2010; 2014; 2018; 2022; 2026

Austria competed at the 1988 Winter Paralympics in Innsbruck, Austria. 52 competitors from Austria won 44 medals including 20 gold, 10 silver and 14 bronze and finished 2nd in the medal table.

== Alpine skiing ==
The medalists are:

- (gold) Martina Altenberger, Women's Downhill LW6/8
- (gold) Martina Altenberger, Women's Giant Slalom LW6/8
- (gold) Martina Altenberger, Women's Slalom LW6/8
- (gold) Paul Bluschke, Men's Giant Slalom LW10
- (gold) Paul Bluschke, Men's Slalom LW10
- (gold) Franz Griessbacher, Men's Downhill B1
- (gold) Franz Griessbacher, Men's Giant Slalom B1
- (gold) Odo Habermann, Men's Downhill B2
- (gold) Odo Habermann, Men's Giant Slalom B2
- (gold) Elisabeth Kellner, Women's Downhill B2
- (gold) Elisabeth Kellner, Women's Giant Slalom B2
- (gold) Elisabeth Maxwald, Women's Giant Slalom B1
- (gold) Josef Meusburger, Men's Giant Slalom LW4
- (gold) Dietmar Schweninger, Men's Slalom LW6/8
- (gold) Meinhard Tatschl, Men's Giant Slalom LW6/8
- (silver) Gabriele Berghofer, Women's Giant Slalom B2
- (silver) Edith Hoelzl, Women's Downhill B2
- (silver) Gerhard Langer, Men's Downhill LW3
- (silver) Markus Ramsauer, Men's Giant Slalom LW4
- (bronze) Gabriele Berghofer, Women's Downhill B2
- (bronze) Rainer Bergmann, Men's Giant Slalom LW2
- (bronze) Edith Hoelzl, Women's Giant Slalom B2
- (bronze) Willi Hohm, Men's Downhill B1
- (bronze) Gerhard Langer, Men's Giant Slalom LW3
- (bronze) Gerhard Pscheider, Men's Giant Slalom B2
- (bronze) Meinhard Tatschl, Men's Downhill LW6/8
- (bronze) Meinhard Tatschl, Men's Slalom LW6/8

== Biathlon ==
The medalists are:

- (silver) Wolfgang Pickl, Men's 7.5 km LW6/8

== Cross-country ==
The medalists are:

- (gold) Veronika Preining, Women's Short Distance 5 km B1
- (silver) Veronika Preining, Renata Hoenisch, Marian Susitz, Women's 3x5 km Relay B1-3
- (silver) Renata Hoenisch, Women's Short Distance 5 km B2
- (silver) Veronika Preining, Women's Long Distance 10 km B1
- (bronze) Hildegard Fetz, Women's Long Distance 5 km grade II
- (bronze) Hildegard Fetz, Women's Short Distance 2.5 km grade II
- (bronze) Renata Hoenisch, Women's Long Distance 10 km B2
- (bronze) Marian Susitz, Women's Short Distance 5 km B2

== Ice sledge speed racing ==
The medalists are:

- (gold) Felix Karl, Men's 100 m grade I
- (gold) Felix Karl, Men's 300 m grade I
- (gold) Felix Karl, Men's 500 m grade I
- (gold) Felix Karl, Men's 700 m grade I
- (silver) Josef Greil, Men's 100 m grade I
- (silver) Josef Greil, Men's 300 m grade I
- (bronze) Josef Greil, Men's 500 m grade I
- (bronze) Josef Greil, Men's 700 m grade I

== See also ==
- Austria at the Paralympics
- Austria at the 1988 Winter Olympics
