= Norway at the 1984 Winter Paralympics =

- Flag of Norway
- IPC code: NOR
- NPC: Norwegian Olympic and Paralympic Committee and Confederation of Sports
- Medals Ranked 3rd: Gold 15 Silver 13 Bronze 13 Total 41

Winter Paralympics appearances (overview)
- 1976; 1980; 1984; 1988; 1992; 1994; 1998; 2002; 2006; 2010; 2014; 2018; 2022; 2026

Norway competed at the 1984 Winter Paralympics held in Innsbruck, Austria. In total athletes representing Norway won 15 gold medals, 13 silver medals and 13 bronze medals and the country finished in 3rd place in the medal table.

== Cross-country skiing ==
Competitors representing Norway won six gold medals, three silver medals and two bronze medals.

== Ice sledge speed racing ==
Competitors representing Norway won nine gold medals, 10 silver medals and 11 bronze medals.

== See also ==
- Norway at the Paralympics
- Norway at the 1984 Summer Paralympics
