= Bonnie St. John =

American para-alpine skier

Personal information
- Born: November 7, 1964 Detroit, U.S.

Skiing career
- Sport: Alpine skiing

Bonnie St. John (born November 7, 1964) is an American former Paralympic skier, author, and public speaker. St. John had her right leg amputated below the knee when she was 5 years old. Despite these challenges, she went on to excel as an athlete, a scholar, a mother and a businesswoman. She is the first African-American to win medals in Winter Paralympic competition as a ski racer, and the first African-American to medal in any paralympic event. St. John earned bronze and silver medals in several alpine skiing events during the 1984 Winter Paralympics. After graduating from Harvard and earning a Rhodes Scholarship, St. John went on to successful corporate career, first in sales with IBM, then as a corporate consultant. She has also written six books, including one each with her daughter Darcy, and her husband, Allen P. Haines.

== Early life ==
Bonnie St. John was born in Detroit on November 7, 1964, and was raised in San Diego. Her mother, Ruby Cremaschi-Schwimmer, was a principal at Lincoln High School (San Diego). Her father, Lee St. John, left before she was born. Her mother later married an older man, who physically abused St. John and her older sister. Due to a condition called pre-femoral focal disorder, St. John had her right leg amputated below the knee when she was 5 years old. She graduated from The Bishop's School in 1982, and graduated magna cum laude from Harvard University in 1986, St. John won a Rhodes Scholarship to Trinity College, Oxford, where she earned her M.Litt. degree in economics in 1990.

== Athletic career ==
At the 1984 Winter Paralympics in Innsbruck, Austria, St. John won a bronze medal in the slalom, a bronze medal in the giant slalom, and was awarded a silver medal for overall performance thereby earning her the distinction of being the second fastest woman in the world on one leg in that year.

== Writing career ==
St. John has written six books: Succeeding Sane; Getting Ahead at Work Without Leaving Your Family Behind; Money: Fall Down? Get Up!; How Strong Women Pray; Live Your Joy; and co-written with her daughter, Darcy Deane, How Great Women Lead. For that book, the two travelled to interview women leaders, including Hillary Clinton, Condoleezza Rice, President of Liberia Ellen Johnson-Sirleaf, and Facebook COO Sheryl Sandberg. Her most recent book, Micro-Resilience, was co-written with her husband Allen Haines.

== Personal life ==
Bonnie St. John was formerly married to Dr. Grant Deane, an ocean acoustician and physicist at Scripps Institute of Oceanography.

At the 2002 Winter Paralympics in Salt Lake City, Utah, St. John spoke during the opening ceremonies.

In February 2007, as part of the celebration of Black History Month, St. John was honored at the White House by President George W. Bush who said: "[Bonnie St. John] is the kind of person that you really want to be around, and the kind of person that shows that individual courage matters in life."

In 2006 St. John was featured in a nationwide Starbucks campaign called "The Way I See It", which featured beverage cups with inspirational quotes from various public figures. St. John's quote was as follows: "I was ahead in the slalom. But in the second run, everyone fell on a dangerous spot. I was beaten by a woman that got up faster than I did. I learned that people fall down, winners get up, and gold medal winners just get up faster."

NBC Nightly News selected St. John as "One of the five most inspiring women in America". She has appeared on The Today Show, Good Morning America, CNN, Montel and the Discovery Health Channel. The New York Times and People have also profiled St. John and noted her extraordinary achievements. She worked in the White House during the Clinton administration as a Director for the National Economic Council, and is currently CEO of Courageous Spirit, Inc.

== See also ==
- Paralympics
- Alpine skiing
