= Vivienne Gapes =

New Zealand Paralympic skier (born 1959)

Personal information
- Nickname: Viv
- Nationality: New Zealand
- Born: 17 June 1959 (age 67)
Medal record
Women's para alpine skiing
Representing New Zealand
Paralympic Games
Gold medal – first place	1984 Innsbruck	Giant Slalom
Silver medal – second place	1984 Innsbruck	Downhill
Silver medal – second place	1984 Innsbruck	Alpine Combination
World Championships
Gold medal – first place	1986 Sälen	Giant Slalom
Silver medal – second place	1986 Sälen	Downhill
Silver medal – second place	1986 Sälen	Alpine Combination

Vivienne Gapes (formerly Vivienne Martin; born 17 June 1959) is a Paralympic medalist from New Zealand who competed in alpine skiing. She competed in the 1984 Winter Paralympics where she won a gold in giant slalom and a pair of silver medals in downhill and alpine combination. Two years later she won the same medal haul with a gold in giant slalom, silver in downhill and silver in alpine combination at the 1986 IPC Alpine Skiing World Championships in Sälen, Sweden.
