= Sheila Holzworth =

American para-alpine skier (1961–2013)

Medal record

Women's alpine skiing

Representing the United States

Paralympic Games
Gold medal – first place	1984 Innsbruck	Women's Giant Slalom B1
Gold medal – first place	1984 Innsbruck	Women's Alpine Combination B1
Silver medal – second place	1984 Innsbruck	Women's Downhill B1

Sheila Holzworth (August 28, 1961 – March 29, 2013) was an American para-alpine skier. After going blind at age ten, she went on to win two gold medals and a silver medal at the 1984 Winter Paralympics as part of the United States delegation, among other achievements.

== Biography ==
In 1981, the International Year of Disabled Persons, Holzworth was the first blind woman to climb Mount Rainier. She completed the climb as part of a team of people with disabilities.

In 1982, she won a gold medal in the giant slalom and silver in the slalom at the national ski competition hosted by the United States Association of Blind Athletes.

Holzworth won gold medals in two alpine skiing events, Women's Giant Slalom B1 and Women's Alpine Combination B1, at the 1984 Winter Paralympics. In addition, she won a silver medal in Women's Downhill B1. At the 1988 Winter Paralympics, Holzworth was entered in the Women's Downhill B1 event but did not start.

She competed and won medals in several other competitions, including the World Cup Championships of Winter Sports for the Disabled in Switzerland and the National Snow Ski Competition and American Blind Water Ski Championships in 1983, and the International Blind Water Ski Competition in Norway in 1984. She also set other records, including a world record in trick water skiing for the blind and disabled in 1989, and being the first sightless person to jump on water skis in the United States.

She won the Ten Outstanding Young Americans award in 1989. She was invited to White House receptions at different times by Presidents Ronald Reagan and George H. W. Bush.
