= Brigitte Madlener =

Austrian para-alpine skier

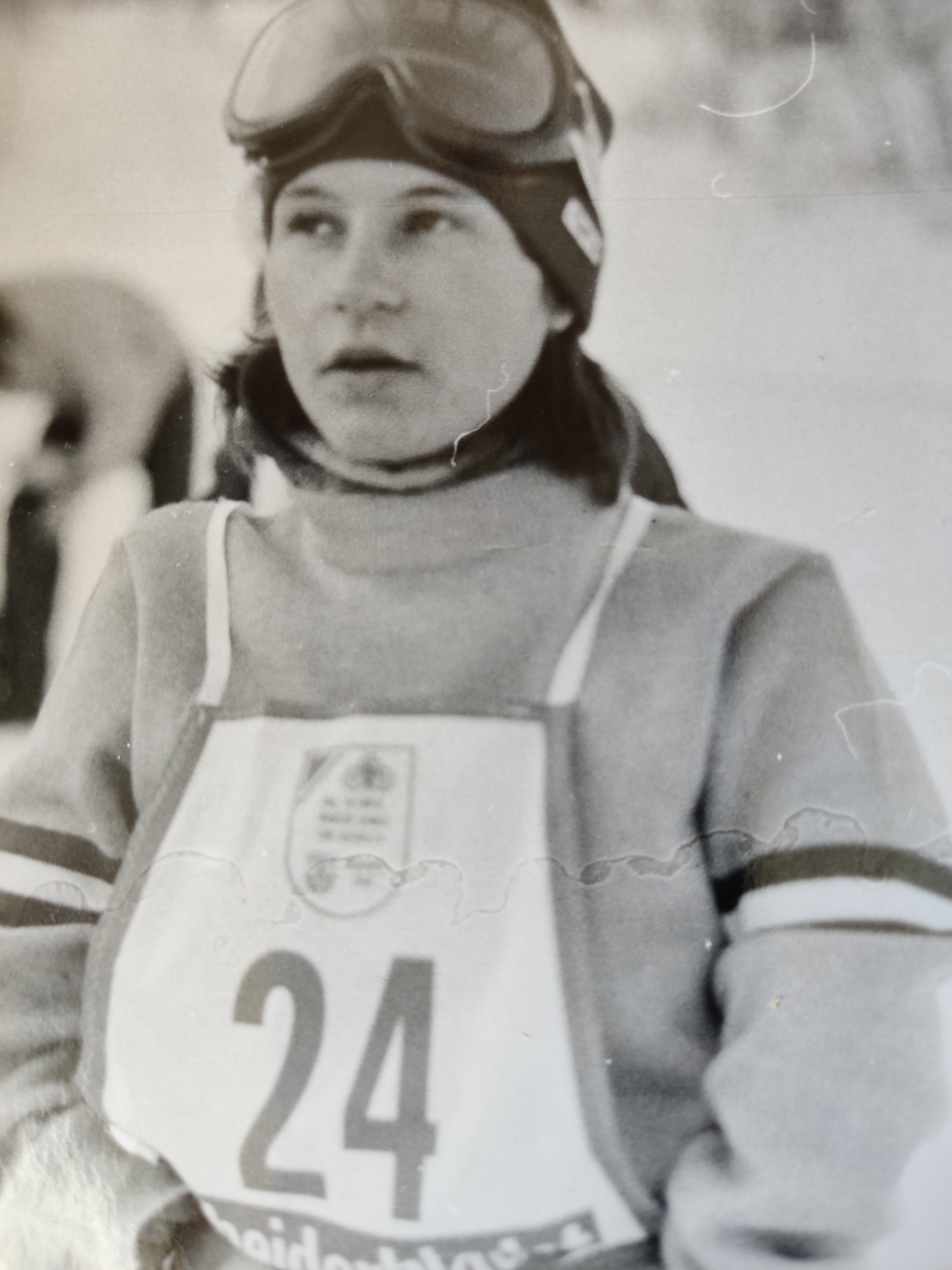

Personal information
- Born: 1962 (age 63–64)

Sport
- Country: Austria
- Sport: Para-alpine skiing
Medal record
Paralympic Games
Gold medal – first place	1980 Geilo	Giant Slalom 3B
Silver medal – second place	1980 Geilo	Slalom 3B
Gold medal – first place	1984 Innsbruck	Giant Slalom LW5/7
Gold medal – first place	1984 Innsbruck	Downhill LW5/7
Gold medal – first place	1984 Innsbruck	Alpine Combination LW5/7
Silver medal – second place	1984 Innsbruck	Slalom LW5/7

Brigitte Madlener (born 1962 in Dornbirn) is an Austrian para-alpine skier. She represented Austria at the 1980 Winter Paralympics and at the 1984 Winter Paralympics. In total, she won four gold medals and two silver medals at the Winter Paralympics.

== Achievements ==
Year	Competition	Location	Position	Event	Time
1980	1980 Winter Paralympics	Geilo, Norway	1st	Giant Slalom 3B	2:52.86
1980	1980 Winter Paralympics	Geilo, Norway	2nd	Slalom 3B	1:40.68
1984	1984 Winter Paralympics	Innsbruck, Austria	1st	Giant Slalom LW5/7	1:38.81
1984	1984 Winter Paralympics	Innsbruck, Austria	1st	Downhill LW5/7	1:24.92
1984	1984 Winter Paralympics	Innsbruck, Austria	1st	Alpine Combination LW5/7	0:18.65
1984	1984 Winter Paralympics	Innsbruck, Austria	2nd	Slalom LW5/7	1:36.05

== See also ==
- List of Paralympic medalists in alpine skiing
