= Stephen Ellefson =

Canadian Paralympic athlete (born 1954)

Personal information
- Nationality: Canadian
- Citizenship: Canadian
- Born: 16 October 1954 (age 71) Edmonton, Alberta
- Height: 183 cm (6 ft 0 in)
- Weight: 72 kg (159 lb)

Sport
- Country: Canada
- Sport: Skiing; Wheelchair athletics
Medal record
Skiing
Representing Canada
Paralympic Games
Bronze medal – third place	1988 Innsbruck	Men's Downhill LW1

Stephen Ellefson (born October 16, 1954) is a Canadian Paralympic athlete. He competed in alpine skiing in the 1988 Winter Paralympics, winning a bronze medal. Later, he competed in wheelchair athletics events in the 1996 and 2000 Summer Paralympics, including the marathon.
