= Cara Dunne-Yates =

American lawyer

Skiing career
- Sport: Alpine skiing

Cara Dunne-Yates (March 17, 1970 – October 20, 2004) was an American paralympian, lawyer, and advocate. She was a Paralympic medalist in both winter and summer sports. She was Harvard-educated, and the only disabled First Marshall (class president) of any major university. She was also a UCLA-educated lawyer (1997), who was the first to legally fight the Law School Admission Council in order to make them use a Braille examination format of the LSAT.

== Cancer ==
Born and raised in the northwest side of Chicago, Illinois, Dunne-Yates was diagnosed at 15 months with retinoblastoma (RB), a retinal cancer. One eye was immediately removed, and after three years of chemotherapy and radiation therapy, her other eye was also removed as a life saving treatment.

A few months after graduating from Harvard College, she was diagnosed with a facial cancer osteosarcoma. In two operations, part of her right cheekbone and palate were removed. She endured six months of intensive chemotherapy and rehabilitation treatment.

Eight years later, in 2000, she was again diagnosed with a rare and aggressive leiomyosarcoma in the abdomen. The cancer soon traveled to her liver and ultimately caused her death in October, 2004.

== Education ==
Class of 1984 – Dunne-Yates attended Farnsworth Elementary School.

Class of 1988 – Taft High School in Chicago.

Class of 1992 – Dunne-Yates graduated as First Marshall (class president) and magna cum laude from Harvard with an A.B. in East Asian Studies and a minor in Economics.

Class of 1997 – Dunne-Yates graduated from UCLA School of Law, after a one-year medical deferral, and while training for the 1996 U.S. Paralympic Cycling Team.

2002–2004 – Fellow at Brandeis University, Waltham, Massachusetts – Women's Studies Scholars Program.

== Athletic career ==
In 1976, when Dunne-Yates was six, her mother Mary Zabelski introduced her to alpine skiing as part of a Chicago-based group, The American Blind Ski Association (ABSF). Eventually, Dunne-Yates and her soon-to-be stepfather, Richard Zabelski, trained with ABSF at local ski areas as part of inter-club races. In 1979, after two seasons of skiing for fun as a family activity, she entered her first ski race. With a disastrous beginning, Dunne-Yates and stepfather, who served exclusively as her ski coach throughout her skiing career, developed a new guiding technique, where the skier would follow the guide. This "front guiding" technique was never previously demonstrated in blind ski racing. After numerous inter-club races with blind skiers from groups from Wisconsin and Michigan, Dunne-Yates' technique and confidence as a ski racer improved. In 1982, she and her stepfather prepared for and competed in the first ever U.S. Blind National Alpine Championships; she won the gold medal in giant slalom. At age 11, she competed in the adult women's category, demonstrating for the first time the front guiding technique. She was selected as the team's youngest member. She competed with the U.S. Paralympic Alpine Ski Team from 1982 to 1989, and medalled in world championship events in Switzerland, Canada, Austria, and Sweden.

In 1994, Dunne-Yates entered UCLA School of Law. In 1995, she met and began training with Scott Evans, an accomplished velodrome cyclist. They trained daily on a tandem track bike, while each attended classes at UCLA. Dunne-Yates and Evans entered several races to build strength, coordination, and strategy. In 1996, they entered their first U.S. National Cycling Championships in Houston, Texas, participating in categories for visually impaired cyclists. They won first place and were selected for the 1996 Atlanta Paralympic Cycling Team. Throughout her cycling career, Dunne-Yates was exclusively piloted by Evans.

U.S. National Alpine skiing Championships

1979 – Developed and pioneered the "Front Guiding" technique, where the skier is guided through the sounds of the guide's skis and verbal commands from in front of the visually impaired skier.

1981 – Winner of gold medal for women's giant slalom at the 1st U.S. National Alpine Skiing Championships for the Blind, U.S. Alpine National Championships (Upper Peninsula, Michigan); race sanctioned by the United States Association of Blind Athletes (USABA).

1981 – Selected as the youngest member of the U.S. Paralympic Ski Team at age 11.

1981 – Multiple national championship medalist at the 88th U.S. National Alpine Skiing Championships, U.S. Association for Blind Skiers (USABA).

Paralympic Winter Games

1984 – Bronze medal for women's alpine combo alpine skiing (Innsbruck, Austria).
1984 – Bronze medal for women's downhill alpine skiing (Innsbruck, Austria).
1984 – Silver medal for women's giant slalom alpine skiing (Innsbruck, Austria).

1988 – Silver medal for women's downhill alpine skiing (Innsbruck, Austria).
1988 – Silver medal for women's giant slalom alpine skiing (Innsbruck, Austria).

IPC Alpine Skiing World Championships

1982 – Bronze medal for women's alpine skiing combo (Le Diablerets, Switzerland).
1982 – Bronze medal for women's downhill alpine skiing (Le Diablerets, Switzerland).
1982 – Silver medal for women's giant slalom alpine skiing (Le Diablerets, Switzerland).

1986 – Bronze medal for women's downhill alpine skiing (Salen, Sweden).
1986 – Silver medal for women's giant slalom alpine skiing (Salen, Sweden).
1986 – Bronze medal for women's alpine combo alpine skiing (Salen, Sweden).

Summer Paralympic Games

1996 – Silver medal for mixed tandem 1 km cycling (Atlanta, Georgia).
1996 – Bronze medal for 200 meter sprint tandem cycling, (Atlanta, Georgia).

2000 – 10th place in the kilo at the 2000 (Sydney, Australia).

World Cycling Championships

1998 World Cycling Championships – Member of U.S. Cycling team (Colorado Springs, Colorado).

== Advocacy ==
Dunne-Yates was also a writer and poet. She was a journalist for several community newspapers in Illinois, Massachusetts, and Colorado, including the 1998–2001 U.S. Olympic Committee's Website. She was also contributor to the Encyclopedia of Women and Sport in America with her essay on female athletes and athletics, and published in both the United States and Japan.

Dunne-Yates' advocacy accomplishments include:

- 1988 – Published in The Journal of Law and Medicine (October 1998) on the ethics of prenatal diagnosis of genetically based disability.
- 1989 – Traveled to Japan as an official emissary of Mayor Richard M. Daley and the City of Chicago.
- 1991 – Returned to Japan to lecture on the rights of disabled people. She appeared multiple times on Japanese television and radio and in the print media. She testified before Japanese legislators.
- 1991 – Successfully compelled the Law School Admissions Council to provide the LSAT in Braille for the first time.
- 1992 – Co-director of the National Retinoblastoma Foundation.
- 1993 – Co-president of the New England Retinoblastoma Family Foundation.
- 1997 – Featured on ABC's 20/20 in "Cara Dunne-Yates: Her Personal Story".

== Family ==
Dunne-Yates was the daughter of Mary S. Zabelski and stepdaughter of Richard Zabelski of Chicago. She married in 1998 to Spencer Yates, a sighted cyclist. Dunne-Yates has a daughter, Elise, born in 2000, and a son, Carson, born in 2003.

== Honors ==
1987 – Harvard Club of Chicago (HCC) designated top candidate from 400 plus Chicago area applications for admission to Harvard University – undergraduate.

1988 – Admitted early admission to Harvard University Undergraduate. She was the only blind student.

1989 – Official emissary of Richard M. Daley and the City of Chicago, visiting various cities and prefectures throughout Japan, lecturing, and writing.

1992 – Graduated magna cum laude with a Bachelor of Arts in East Asian Languages and a minor in Economics. She was "First Marshall" of the Class of 1992.

1996 – Received the Reynolds Award from Massachusetts General Hospital for her advocacy efforts on behalf of families with blind children, including those with additional disabilities. She was a co-honoree with former Senator Edward Kennedy.

1997 – United States Association of Blind Athletes Female Athlete of the Year.

1998 – Gene Autry Foundation Courage Award for showing heroism in the face of adversity.

2001 – Carpe Diem Award from the Lance Armstrong Foundation.

2001 – Inducted into the International Scholar-Athlete Hall of Fame, located at the Institute for International Sport (Kingston, Rhode Island).

2002 – Awarded the Jane Rainie Opel '50 Young Alumna Award from the Radcliffe Association, Harvard University. The award is presented annually to an alumna in the 10th reunion class for outstanding contribution to the advancement of women, to her profession, or to the institute.

2002 – True Hero of Sports Award from the Center for the Study of Sports in Society, Northeastern University (Boston, Massachusetts).

2010 – A life-size statue in the likeness of Cara Dunne-Yates and her guide-dog, Haley, was erected near the base of the Elk Camp Gondola in Snowmass Village, Colorado. The statue was moved in 2019 to a nearby location close to the Base Village Transit Center.
