= 1984 Winter Paralympics =

Multi-parasport event in Innsbruck, Austria

III Paralympic Winter Games
- Location: Innsbruck, Austria
- Nations: 21
- Athletes: 419
- Events: 107 in 3 sports
- Opening: 14 January 1984
- Closing: 20 January 1984
- Opened by: President Rudolf Kirchschläger
- Stadium: Olympiahalle

The 1984 Winter Paralympic Games (German: Paralympische Winterspiele 1984) were the third Winter Paralympics. They were held from 14 to 20 January 1984 in Innsbruck, Austria. They were the first Winter Games organized by the International Co-ordinating Committee (ICC), which was formed on 15 March 1982, in Leysin, Switzerland. These Games were accessible for all athletes with cerebral palsy. Three sports were contested: alpine skiing, cross-country skiing, and ice sledge speed racing. The most successful athletes were Helmut Falch (AUT), Paul Di Bello (USA), Gunilla Åhren (SWE) and Lahja Hämäläinen (FIN) who each won four Gold Medals. The Games, then known as the 3rd World Winter Games for the Disabled, were fully sanctioned by the International Olympic Committee (IOC). (The regular 1984 Winter Olympics were held in Sarajevo, Yugoslavia. For the first time, an exhibition event was held at the Olympic Winter Games there and 30 male three-track skiers took part in the giant slalom event in Sarajevo.)

== Sports ==
- Alpine skiing
- Ice sledge speed racing
- Cross-country skiing

== Medal table ==
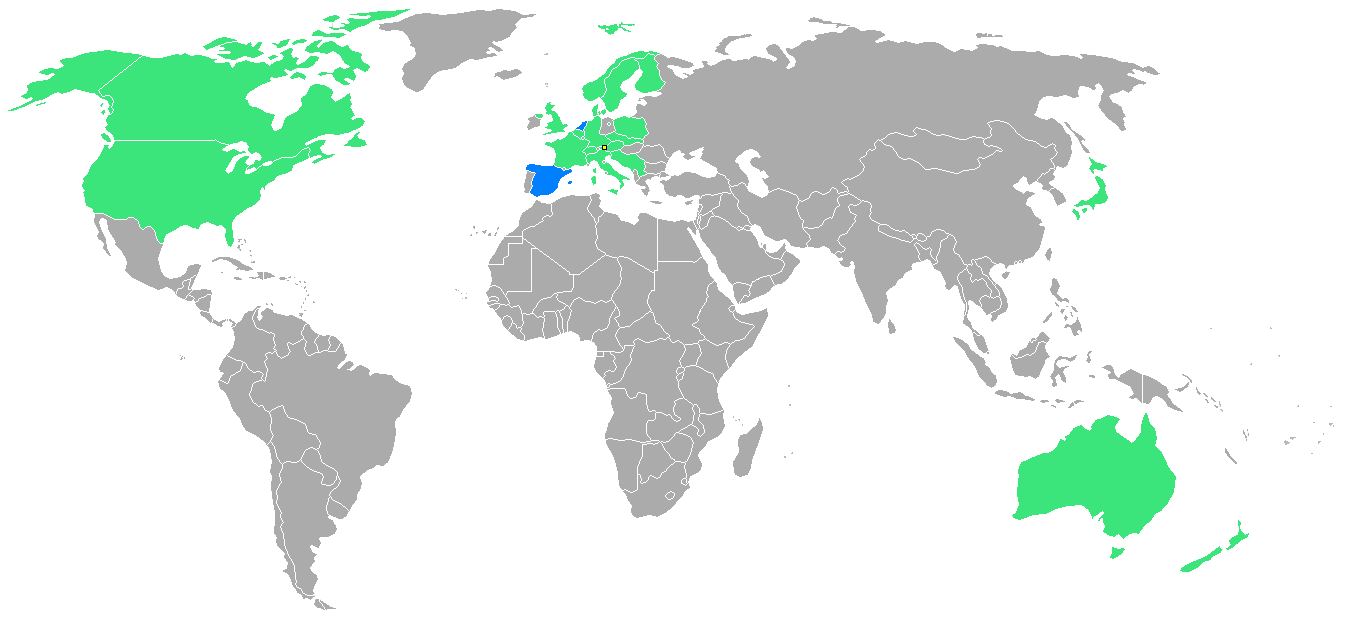
Participating countries; first time participants are blue.

The top 10 NPCs by number of gold medals are listed below. The host nation (Austria) is highlighted.

Rank	Nation	Gold	Silver	Bronze	Total
1	Austria*	34	19	17	70
2	Finland	19	9	6	34
3	Norway	15	13	13	41
4	West Germany	10	14	10	34
5	United States	7	14	14	35
6	Sweden	7	2	5	14
7	Switzerland	5	16	16	37
8	France	4	2	0	6
9	Poland	3	2	8	13
10	Canada	2	8	4	14
Totals (10 entries)		106	99	93	298

== Participating nations ==
Twenty one nations participated in the 1984 Winter Paralympics. Netherlands and Spain made their debut appearances. Belgium and Poland returned to the Winter Games after missing out in the 1980 Winter Paralympics.

- Australia (3)
- Austria (59) (Host nation)
- Belgium (3)
- Canada (22)
- Czechoslovakia (2)
- Denmark (5)
- Finland (30)
- France (16)
- Great Britain (22)
- Italy (7)
- Japan (15)
- Netherlands (6)
- New Zealand (8)
- Norway (37)
- Poland (16)
- Spain (4)
- Sweden (22)
- Switzerland (50)
- United States (51)
- West Germany (31)
- Yugoslavia (10)

== See also ==
- 1984 Winter Olympics
- 1984 Summer Paralympics

Preceded by Geilo	Winter Paralympics; Innsbruck; III Paralympic Winter Games (1984)	Succeeded by Innsbruck
