= Cross-country skiing at the 1988 Winter Paralympics =

Cross-country skiing at the IV Paralympic Winter Games

Cross-country skiing at the 1988 Winter Paralympics consisted of 38 events, 23 for men and 15 for women.

== Medal table ==
Rank	Nation	Gold medal	Silver medal	Bronze medal	Total
1	Norway (NOR)	14	11	4	29
2	Finland (FIN)	8	7	7	22
3	Canada (CAN)	4	0	1	5
4	Switzerland (SUI)	3	2	3	8
5	West Germany (FRG)	2	6	4	12
6	France (FRA)	2	1	1	4
7	Austria (AUT)	1	3	4	8
8	Sweden (SWE)	1	3	2	6
9	Poland (POL)	1	1	3	5
10	Italy (ITA)	1	0	2	3
11	United States (USA)	1	0	1	2
12	Spain (ESP)	0	2	0	2
13	Soviet Union (URS)	0	0	2	2
Total		38	36	34	108

== Medal summary ==
The competition events were:

- 2.5 km: - women
- 5 km: men - women
- 10 km: men - women
- 15 km: men
- 20 km: men
- 30 km: men
- 3x2.5 km relay: men
- 3x5 km relay: - women
- 4x5 km relay: men
- 4x10 km relay: men

Each event had separate standing, sitting, or visually impaired classifications:

- LW2 - standing: single leg amputation above the knee
- LW 3 - standing: double leg amputation below the knee, mild cerebral palsy, or equivalent impairment
- LW4 - standing: single leg amputation below the knee
- LW5/7 - standing: double arm amputation
- LW6/8 - standing: single arm amputation
- LW9 - standing: amputation or equivalent impairment of one arm and one leg
- Gr I - sitting: paraplegia with no or some upper abdominal function and no functional sitting balance
- Gr II - sitting: paraplegia with fair functional sitting balance
- B1 - visually impaired: no functional vision
- B2 - visually impaired: up to ca 3-5% functional vision

=== Men's events ===
Event	Class	Gold	Silver	Bronze
5 km - short distance	Grade I	Heinz Frei; Switzerland	Adolf Stuber; West Germany	Guenther Lercher; West Germany
5 km - short distance	Grade II	Knut Lundstroem; Norway	Erik Sandbraaten; Norway	Michael Weymann; West Germany
5 km - short distance	LW2	Christoph Andres; Switzerland	Pertti Sankilampi; Finland	Samuli Kaemi; Finland
5 km - short distance	LW3/9	Terje Gruer; Norway	Miguel Angel Perez Tello; Spain	Jan Kolodziej; Poland
5 km - short distance	LW4	Kalervo Pieksaemaeki; Finland	Svein Lilleberg; Norway	Svein Tore Fauskrud; Norway
5 km - short distance	LW5/7	Pierre Delaval; France	Marcin Kos; Poland	Pauli Moelsae; Finland
10 km - short distance	LW6/8	Kimmo Kettunen; Finland	Jouko Grip; Finland	Jean-Yves Arvier; France
10 km - long distance	Grade I	Terje Johansen; Norway	Adolf Stuber; West Germany	Heinz Frei; Switzerland
10 km - long distance	Grade II	Knut Lundstroem; Norway	Walter Widmer; Switzerland	Erik Sandbraaten; Norway
10 km - long distance	LW2	Christoph Andres; Switzerland	Viggo Norseth; Norway	Pertti Sankilampi; Finland
10 km - long distance	LW3/9	Terje Gruer; Norway	Miguel Angel Perez Tello; Spain	Jan Kolodziej; Poland
15 km - short distance	B1	Hans Anton Aalien; Norway	Asmund Tveit; Norway	Ake Pettersson; Sweden
15 km - short distance	B2	Frank Hoefle; West Germany	Terje Loevaas; Norway	Bertil Tegelund; Sweden
15 km - short distance	B3	Robert Walsh; United States	Max Stalnacke; Sweden	Paolo Lorenzini; Italy
15 km - long distance	LW4	Kalervo Pieksaemaeki; Finland	Svein Lilleberg; Norway	Svein Tore Fauskrud; Norway
15 km - long distance	LW5/7	Marcin Kos; Poland	Pierre Delaval; France	Jerzy Szlezak; Poland
20 km - long distance	LW6/8	Jean-Yves Arvier; France	Jouko Grip; Finland	Kimmo Kettunen; Finland
30 km - long distance	B1	Ake Pettersson; Sweden	Hans Anton Aalien; Norway	Asmund Tveit; Norway
30 km - long distance	B2	Frank Hoefle; West Germany	Terje Loevaas; Norway	Ismo Alanko; Finland
30 km - long distance	B3	Paolo Lorenzini; Italy	Max Stalnacke; Sweden	Joe Walsh; United States
3x2.5 km relay	Grade I-II	Norway (NOR); Terje Johansen; Knut Lundstroem; Erik Sandbraaten	Switzerland (SUI); Walter Baertschi; Heinz Frei; Walter Widmer	West Germany (FRG); Guenther Lercher; Adolf Stuber; Michael Weymann
4x5 km relay	LW2-9	Norway (NOR); Svein Tore Fauskrud; Terje Gruer; Svein Lilleberg; Viggo Norseth	Finland (FIN); Jouko Grip; Kimmo Kettunen; Kalervo Pieksaemaeki; Pertti Sankilampi	West Germany (FRG); Roland Gaess; Martin Haag; Wolfgang Mahler; Reinhold Schwer
4x10 km relay	B1-3	Norway (NOR); Hans Anton Aalien; Arild Hovslien; Terje Loevaas; Asmund Tveit	Sweden (SWE); Eskil Hoeglund; Ake Pettersson; Max Stalnacke; Bertil Tegelund	Italy (ITA); Paolo Lorenzini; Riccardo Tomasini; Hubert Tscholl; Erich Walch

=== Women's events ===
Event	Class	Gold	Silver	Bronze
2.5 km - short distance	Grade I	Kirsti Hooeen; Norway	Waltraud Hagenlocher; West Germany	None
2.5 km - short distance	Grade II	Ragnhild Myklebust; Norway	Sylva Olsen; Norway	Hildegard Fetz; Austria
5 km - short distance	B1	Veronika Preining; Austria	Kirsti Pennanen; Finland	Valentina Grigoryeva; Soviet Union
5 km - short distance	B2	Sandra Lecour; Canada	Renata Hoenisch; Austria	Marian Susitz; Austria
5 km - short distance	B3	Miia Ryynaenen; Finland	Sissel Soerensen; Norway	Tarja Hovinen; Finland
5 km - short distance	LW3/4/9	Francine Lemire; Canada	Anneliese Tenzler; West Germany	Monika Waelti; Switzerland
5 km - short distance	LW6/8	Tanja Tervonen; Finland	None	None
5 km - long distance	Grade I	Kirsti Hooeen; Norway	Waltraud Hagenlocher; West Germany	None
5 km - long distance	Grade II	Ragnhild Myklebust; Norway	Sylva Olsen; Norway	Hildegard Fetz; Austria
10 km - long distance	B1	Kirsti Pennanen; Finland	Veronika Preining; Austria	Valentina Grigoryeva; Soviet Union
10 km - long distance	B2	Sandra Lecour; Canada	Kyllikki Luhtapuro; Finland	Renata Hoenisch; Austria
10 km - long distance	B3	Sissel Soerensen; Norway	Tarja Hovinen; Finland	Miia Ryynaenen; Finland
10 km - long distance	LW3/4/9	Francine Lemire; Canada	Anneliese Tenzler; West Germany	Monika Waelti; Switzerland
10 km - long distance	LW6/8	Tanja Tervonen; Finland	None	None
3x5 km relay	B1-3	Finland (FIN); Tarja Hovinen; Kirsti Pennanen; Miia Ryynaenen	Austria (AUT); Renata Hoenisch; Veronika Preining; Marian Susitz	Canada (CAN); Sandra Lecour; Tricia Lovegrove; Kim Umback

== See also ==
- Cross-country skiing at the 1988 Winter Olympics
