= Cross-country skiing at the 2002 Winter Paralympics =

Cross-country skiing at the VIII Paralympic Winter Games

Cross-country skiing at the 2002 Winter Paralympics consisted of 32 events, 20 for men and 12 for women.

== Medal table ==
| Rank | Nation | Gold medal | Silver medal | Bronze medal | Total |
|---|---|---|---|---|---|
| 1 | Norway (NOR) | 9 | 1 | 5 | 15 |
| 2 | Russia (RUS) | 7 | 8 | 3 | 18 |
| 3 | Germany (GER) | 6 | 1 | 8 | 15 |
| 4 | Finland (FIN) | 4 | 1 | 3 | 8 |
| 5 | Canada (CAN) | 2 | 1 | 0 | 3 |
| 6 | Italy (ITA) | 2 | 0 | 0 | 2 |
| 7 | Belarus (BLR) | 1 | 1 | 0 | 2 |
| 8 | Poland (POL) | 1 | 0 | 1 | 2 |
| 9 | Ukraine (UKR) | 0 | 5 | 5 | 10 |
| 10 | United States (USA) | 0 | 5 | 0 | 5 |
| 11 | France (FRA) | 0 | 3 | 2 | 5 |
| 12 | Netherlands (NED) | 0 | 3 | 0 | 3 |
| 13 | Austria (AUT) | 0 | 1 | 1 | 2 |
| 13 | Sweden (SWE) | 0 | 1 | 1 | 2 |
| 14 | Slovakia (SVK) | 0 | 1 | 0 | 1 |
| 15 | Switzerland (SUI) | 0 | 0 | 2 | 2 |
| 16 | Japan (JPN) | 0 | 0 | 1 | 1 |
| Total | | 32 | 32 | 32 | 96 |

== Medal summary ==
The competition events were:

- 2.5 km: - women
- 5 km: men - women
- 10 km: men - women
- 15 km: men - women
- 20 km: men
- 1x2.5/2x5 km relay: men - women
- 3x2.5 km relay: - women

Each event had separate standing, sitting, or visually impaired classifications:

- LW2 - standing: single leg amputation above the knee
- LW3 - standing: double leg amputation below the knee, mild cerebral palsy, or equivalent impairment
- LW4 - standing: single leg amputation below the knee
- LW5/7 - standing: double arm amputation
- LW6/8 - standing: single arm amputation
- LW9 - standing: amputation or equivalent impairment of one arm and one leg
- LW 10 - sitting: paraplegia with no or some upper abdominal function and no functional sitting balance
- LW 11 - sitting: paraplegia with fair functional sitting balance
- LW 12 - sitting: double leg amputation above the knees, or paraplegia with some leg function and good sitting balance
- B1 - visually impaired: no functional vision
- B2 - visually impaired: up to ca 3-5% functional vision
- B3 - visually impaired: under 10% functional vision

=== Men's events ===
| Event | Class | Gold | Silver | Bronze |
|---|---|---|---|---|
| 5 km classical technique | B1 | Helge Flo guide: Paal Sneve; Norway | Oleh Munts guide: Volodymyr Storozhok; Ukraine | Valeri Kouptchinski guide: Russia |
| 5 km classical technique | B2 | Frank Hoefle guide: Ulrich Zipfel; Germany | Nikolai Ilioutchenko guide: Andrey Gladshev; Russia | Emil Östberg guide: Peter Rune; Sweden |
| 5 km classical technique | B3 | Brian McKeever guide: Robin McKeever; Canada | Irek Mannanov guide: Salavat Gumerov; Russia | Vitaliy Lukyanenko guide: Volodymyr Ivanov; Ukraine |
| 5 km classical technique | LW2-4 | Kjartan Haugen; Norway | Steven Cook; United States | Roland Gaess; Germany |
| 5 km classical technique | LW5-9 | Andreas Hustveit; Norway | Axel Hecker; Germany | Yoshihiro Nitta; Japan |
| 5 km sitski | LW10 | Sergej Shilov; Russia | Mikhail Terentiev; Russia | Klaus Kleiser; Germany |
| 5 km sitski | LW11 | Roland Ruepp; Italy | Oliver Anthofer; Austria | Alain Marguerettaz; France |
| 5 km sitski | LW12 | Taras Kryjanovski; Russia | Vladimir Gajdiciar; Slovakia | Wieslaw Fiedor; Poland |
| 10 km free technique | B1 | Valeri Kouptchinski guide: Viatcheslav Doubov; Russia | Oleh Munts guide: Volodymyr Storozhok; Ukraine | Wilhelm Brem guide: Olaf Gruhn; Germany |
| 10 km free technique | B2 | Frank Hoefle guide: Ulrich Zipfel; Germany | Emil Östberg guide: Peter Rune; Sweden | Nikolai Ilioutchenko guide: Andrey Gladyshev; Russia |
| 10 km free technique | B3 | Brian McKeever guide: Robin McKeever; Canada | Irek Mannanov guide: Salavat Gumerov; Russia | Alexander Schwarz guide: Ralf Rombach; Germany |
| 10 km free technique | LW2-4 | Nils Erik Ulset; Norway | Steven Cook; United States | Harald Thauer; Germany |
| 10 km free technique | LW5-9 | Axel Hecker; Germany | Andreas Hustveit; Norway | Josef Giesen; Germany |
| 10 km sitski | LW10 | Mikhail Terentiev; Russia | Sergej Shilov; Russia | Hanspeter Weber; Switzerland |
| 10 km sitski | LW11 | Roland Ruepp; Italy | Alain Marguerettaz; France | Ruedi Weber; Switzerland |
| 10 km sitski | LW12 | Wieslaw Fiedor; Poland | Robert Balk; United States | Mykola Ovcharenko; Ukraine |
| 15 km sitski | LW10-12 | Sergej Shilov; Russia | Mikhail Terentiev; Russia | Oliver Anthofer; Austria |
| 20 km free technique | standing | Nils Erik Ulset; Norway | Steven Cook; United States | Josef Giesen; Germany |
| 20 km free technique | visually impaired | Valeri Kouptchinski guide: Viatcheslav Doubov; Russia | Brian McKeever guide: Robin McKeever; Canada | Frank Hoefle guide: Ulrich Zipfel; Germany |
| 1x2.5/2x5 km relay | open | Russia (RUS); Irek Mannanov guide: Roman Ivanov; Nikolai Ilioutchenko guide: Andrey Gladysev; Sergej Shilov | United States (USA); Robert Balk; Steven Cook; William Stewart | Norway (NOR); Kjartan Haugen; Karl Einar Henriksen; Andreas Hustveit |

=== Women's events ===
| Event | Class | Gold | Silver | Bronze |
|---|---|---|---|---|
| 2.5 km sitski | | Ragnhild Myklebust; Norway | Svitlana Tryfonova; Ukraine | Olena Iurkovska; Ukraine |
| 5 km classical technique | B1 | Verena Bentele guide: Ralph Schmidt; Germany | Fabienne Kaci guide: Gerard Blanc; France | Merja Hannele Hanski guide: Kirsi Vaisanen; Finland |
| 5 km classical technique | B2-3 | Yadviha Skorabahataya guide: Vasili Haurukovich; Belarus | Jaana Argillander guide: Arto Kaukonen; Finland | Tone Gravvold guide: Kristian Soerensen; Norway |
| 5 km classical technique | standing | Tanja Kari; Finland | Marjorie van de Bunt; Netherlands | Siw Vestengen; Norway |
| 5 km sitski | | Ragnhild Myklebust; Norway | Svitlana Tryfonova; Ukraine | Olena Iurkovska; Ukraine |
| 10 km free technique | B1-2 | Verena Bentele guide: Ralph Schmidt; Germany | Emilie Tabouret guide: Lionel Bayon; France | Fabienne Kaci guide: Gerard Blanc; France |
| 10 km free technique | B3 | Jaana Argillander guide: Arto Kaukonen; Finland | Yadviha Skarabahataya guide: Vasili Haurukovich; Belarus | Tatiana Ilioutchenko guide: Roman Ivanov; Russia |
| 10 km free technique | standing | Tanja Kari; Finland | Marjorie van de Bunt; Netherlands | Siw Vestengen; Norway |
| 10 km sitski | | Ragnhild Myklebust; Norway | Svitlana Tryfonova; Ukraine | Olena Iurkovska; Ukraine |
| 15 km free technique | standing | Tanja Kari; Finland | Marjorie van de Bunt; Netherlands | Siw Vestengen; Norway |
| 15 km free technique | visually impaired | Verena Bentele guide: Ralph Schmidt; Germany | Tatiana Ilioutchenko guide: Andrey Gladyshev; Russia | Jaana Argillander guide: Arto Kaukonen; Finland |
| 3x2.5 km relay | open | Norway (NOR); Tone Gravvold guide: Kristian Soersensen; Ragnhild Myklebust; Siw Vestengen | Russia (RUS); Elvira Ibraginova guide: Salavat Gumerov; Tatiana Ilioutchenko guide: Andrey Gladyshev; Irina Polyakova | Finland (FIN); Jaana Argillander guide: Arto Kaukonen; Merja Hannele Hanski guide: Kirsi Vaisanen; Tanja Kari |

== See also ==
- Cross-country skiing at the 2002 Winter Olympics
