= FIS Nordic World Ski Championships 2025 – Men's para cross-country sprint =

Men's para cross-country sprint at the FIS Nordic World Ski Championships 2025
- Venue: Granåsen Ski Centre
- Location: Trondheim, Norway
- Dates: 4 March (qualification); 5 March

Men's sprint (visually impaired) at the FIS Nordic World Ski Championships 2025
- Competitors: 16 from 9 nations

Medalists
gold medal	Zebastian Modin; Guide: Emil Jönsson	Sweden
silver medal	Jake Adicoff; Guide: Peter Wolter	United States
bronze medal	Inkki Inola; Guide: Arttu Kaario	Finland

Men's sprint (standing) at the FIS Nordic World Ski Championships 2025
- Competitors: 19 from 8 nations

Medalists
gold medal	Karl Tabouret	France
silver medal	Taiki Kawayoke	Japan
bronze medal	Benjamin Daviet	France

Men's sprint (sitting) at the FIS Nordic World Ski Championships 2025
- Competitors: 21 from 10 nations

Medalists
gold medal	Cristian Ribera	Brazil
silver medal	Pavlo Bal	Ukraine
bronze medal	Yerbol Khamitov	Kazakhstan

The Men's para cross-country sprint competition at the FIS Nordic World Ski Championships 2025 will be held on 4 and 5 March 2025.

== Visually impaired ==
=== Qualification ===
Rank	Bib	Name	Country	Time	Difference	Notes
1	91	Jake Adicoff; Guide: Peter Wolter	United States	3:25.66		Q
2	92	Zebastian Modin; Guide: Emil Jönsson	Sweden	3:29.10	+3.44	Q
3	102	Theo Bold; Guide: Jakob Bold	Germany	3:31.34	+5.68	Q
4	94	Inkki Inola; Guide: Arttu Kaario	Finland	3:31.48	+5.82	Q
5	97	Dmytro Suiarko; Guide: Oleksandr Nikonovych	Ukraine	3:33.53	+7.87	Q
6	99	Iaroslav Reshetynskyi; Guide: Dmytro Drahun	Ukraine	3:35.89	+10.23	Q
7	96	Thomas Oxål; Guide: Geir Lervik	Norway	3:36.88	+11.22	Q
8	101	Lennart Volkert; Guide: Nils Kolb	Germany	3:41.93	+16.27	Q
9	103	Maksym Murashkovskyi; Guide: Vitaliy Trush	Ukraine	3:42.70	+17.04	
10	100	Ihor Kravchuk; Guide: Andriy Dotsenko	Ukraine	3:45.25	+19.59	
11	95	Nico Messinger; Guide: Christian Winker	Germany	3:51.75	+26.09	
12	98	Anatolii Kovalevskyi; Guide: Oleksandr Mukshyn	Ukraine	3:52.90	+27.24	
13	105	Roman Kurbanov; Guide: Anton Zhdanovich	Kazakhstan	4:23.22	+57.56	
14	104	Kim Min-yeong; Guide: Byeon Ju-yeong	South Korea	4:33.79	+1:08.13	
15	106	Alex Lajtman; Guide: Marko Havran	Slovakia	5:14.01	+1:48.35	
	93	Oleksandr Kazik; Guide: Serhii Kucheriavyi	Ukraine	Did not start		

=== Semifinals ===
==== Semifinal 1 ====
Rank	Seed	Athlete	Country	Time	Deficit	Notes
1	4	Inkki Inola; Guide: Arttu Kaario	Finland	3:06.82		Q
2	1	Jake Adicoff; Guide: Peter Wolter	United States	3:07.39	+0.57	Q
3	5	Dmytro Suiarko; Guide: Oleksandr Nikonovych	Ukraine	3:08.81	+1.99	
4	8	Lennart Volkert; Guide: Nils Kolb	Germany	3:24.76	+17.94	

==== Semifinal 2 ====
Rank	Seed	Athlete	Country	Time	Deficit	Notes
1	2	Zebastian Modin; Guide: Emil Jönsson	Sweden	3:27.33		Q
2	7	Thomas Oxål; Guide: Geir Lervik	Norway	3:34.74	+7.36	Q
3	6	Iaroslav Reshetynskyi; Guide: Dmytro Drahun	Ukraine	3:37.22	+9.84	
4	3	Theo Bold; Guide: Jakob Bold	Germany	3:37.30	+9.92	

=== Final ===
Rank	Seed	Athlete	Country	Time	Deficit
1st place, gold medalist(s)	2	Zebastian Modin; Guide: Emil Jönsson	Sweden	3:25.08	
2nd place, silver medalist(s)	1	Jake Adicoff; Guide: Peter Wolter	United States	3:29.52	+4.44
3rd place, bronze medalist(s)	4	Inkki Inola; Guide: Arttu Kaario	Finland	3:37.10	+12.02
4	7	Thomas Oxål; Guide: Geir Lervik	Norway	3:40.93	+15.85

== Standing ==
=== Qualification ===
Rank	Bib	Name	Country	Time	Difference	Notes
1	61	Taiki Kawayoke	Japan	3:13.51		Q
2	62	Sebastian Marburger	Germany	3:22.92	+9.41	Q
3	71	Karl Tabouret	France	3:26.17	+12.66	Q
4	66	Yoshihiro Nitta	Japan	3:26.37	+12.86	Q
5	69	Alexandr Gerlits	Kazakhstan	3:26.67	+13.16	Q
6	65	Serafym Drahun	Ukraine	3:32.43	+18.92	Q
7	73	Kjartan Haugen	Norway	3:33.29	+19.78	Q
8	74	Nurlan Alimov	Kazakhstan	3:34.54	+21.03	Q
9	72	Benjamin Daviet	France	3:35.78	+22.27	Q
10	78	Stefan Egger-Riedmüller	Austria	3:38.71	+25.20	Q
11	68	Grygorii Vovchynskyi	Ukraine	3:39.13	+25.62	Q
12	77	Batmönkhiin Ganbold	Mongolia	3:41.06	+27.55	Q
13	64	Serhii Romaniuk	Ukraine	3:41.86	+28.35	
14	63	Marco Maier	Germany	3:42.99	+29.48	
15	75	Vladislav Kobal	Kazakhstan	3:49.52	+36.01	
16	79	Dashdorj Tsegmid	Mongolia	3:50.89	+37.38	
17	67	Dmytro Sereda	Ukraine	3:55.20	+41.69	
18	70	Nazar Shevchyk	Ukraine	3:57.96	+44.45	
19	76	Denis Zinov	Kazakhstan	4:00.00	+46.49	

=== Semifinals ===
==== Semifinal 1 ====
Rank	Seed	Athlete	Country	Time	Deficit	Notes
1	1	Taiki Kawayoke	Japan	3:38.60		Q
2	4	Yoshihiro Nitta	Japan	3:41.56	+2.96	Q
3	9	Benjamin Daviet	France	3:42.96	+4.36	Q
4	5	Alexandr Gerlits	Kazakhstan	3:52.90	+14.30	
5	8	Nurlan Alimov	Kazakhstan	4:15.58	+36.98	
	12	Batmönkhiin Ganbold	Mongolia	Did not start		

==== Semifinal 2 ====
Rank	Seed	Athlete	Country	Time	Deficit	Notes
1	2	Sebastian Marburger	Germany	3:24.58		Q
2	3	Karl Tabouret	France	3:25.16	+0.58	Q
3	7	Kjartan Haugen	Norway	3:26.51	+1.93	Q
4	6	Serafym Drahun	Ukraine	3:34.15	+9.57	
5	10	Stefan Egger-Riedmüller	Austria	3:45.56	+20.98	
6	11	Grygorii Vovchynskyi	Ukraine	3:52.39	+27.81	

=== Final ===
Rank	Seed	Athlete	Country	Time	Deficit
1st place, gold medalist(s)	3	Karl Tabouret	France	3:46.86	
2nd place, silver medalist(s)	1	Taiki Kawayoke	Japan	3:50.07	+3.21
3rd place, bronze medalist(s)	9	Benjamin Daviet	France	3:53.77	+6.91
4	7	Kjartan Haugen	Norway	3:57.39	+10.53
5	2	Sebastian Marburger	Germany	4:00.22	+13.36
6	4	Yoshihiro Nitta	Japan	4:09.20	+22.34

== Sitting ==
=== Qualification ===
Rank	Bib	Name	Country	Time	Difference	Notes
1	11	Cristian Ribera	Brazil	2:42.06		Q
2	14	Yerbol Khamitov	Kazakhstan	2:42.45	+0.39	Q
3	13	Pavlo Bal	Ukraine	2:45.93	+3.87	Q
4	17	Daniel Cnossen	United States	2:48.75	+6.69	Q
5	15	Oleksandr Aleksyk	Ukraine	2:49.62	+7.56	Q
6	12	Giuseppe Romele	Italy	2:52.43	+10.37	Q
7	16	Vasyl Kravchuk	Ukraine	2:55.98	+13.92	Q
8	20	Michele Biglione	Italy	2:56.17	+14.11	Q
9	24	Arnt Christian Furuberg	Sweden	3:04.05	+21.99	Q
10	23	Jeong Jae-seok	South Korea	3:04.74	+22.68	Q
11	19	Volodymyr Chernysh	Ukraine	3:05.02	+22.96	Q
12	21	Krzysztof Plewa	Poland	3:05.53	+23.47	Q
13	26	Sergey Ussoltsev	Kazakhstan	3:10.05	+27.99	
14	25	Won Yoo-min	South Korea	3:11.91	+29.85	
15	22	Hryhorii Shymko	Ukraine	3:12.95	+30.89	
16	28	Anatolii Zhumik	Ukraine	3:19.45	+37.39	
17	29	Temuri Dadiani	Georgia	3:47.06	+1:05.00	
18	30	David Chávez	El Salvador	3:52.47	+1:10.41	
19	31	Jonathan Arias	El Salvador	4:15.10	+1:33.06	
20	18	Sin Eui-hyun	South Korea	4:17.15	+1:35.11	
	27	Yuriy Berezin	Kazakhstan	Did not finish		

=== Semifinals ===
==== Semifinal 1 ====
Rank	Seed	Athlete	Country	Time	Deficit	Notes
1	1	Cristian Ribera	Brazil	2:29.66		Q
2	5	Oleksandr Aleksyk	Ukraine	2:34.56	+4.90	Q
3	9	Arnt Christian Furuberg	Sweden	2:38.16	+8.50	Q
4	4	Daniel Cnossen	United States	2:38.35	+8.69	
5	8	Michele Biglione	Italy	2:43.43	+13.77	
6	12	Krzysztof Plewa	Poland	2:50.61	+20.95	

==== Semifinal 2 ====
Rank	Seed	Athlete	Country	Time	Deficit	Notes
1	3	Pavlo Bal	Ukraine	2:42.09		Q
2	2	Yerbol Khamitov	Kazakhstan	2:45.27	+3.18	Q
3	7	Vasyl Kravchuk	Ukraine	2:45.76	+3.67	Q
4	6	Giuseppe Romele	Italy	2:47.25	+5.16	
5	10	Jeong Jae-seok	South Korea	2:52.83	+10.74	
6	11	Volodymyr Chernysh	Ukraine	2:53.13	+11.04	

=== Final ===
Rank	Seed	Athlete	Country	Time	Deficit
1st place, gold medalist(s)	1	Cristian Ribera	Brazil	2:25.20	
2nd place, silver medalist(s)	3	Pavlo Bal	Ukraine	2:30.78	+5.58
3rd place, bronze medalist(s)	2	Yerbol Khamitov	Kazakhstan	2:32.45	+7.25
4	7	Vasyl Kravchuk	Ukraine	2:34.68	+9.48
5	5	Oleksandr Aleksyk	Ukraine	2:35.31	+10.11
6	9	Arnt Christian Furuberg	Sweden	2:50.24	+25.04
