= Ice sledge speed racing at the 1988 Winter Paralympics – Women's 500 metres grade II =

Women's 500 metres grade II at the IV Paralympic Winter Games
- Date: January 1988
- Competitors: 5 from 3 nations

Medalists
| 1st place, gold medalist(s) | | Sylva Olsen | Norway |
| 2nd place, silver medalist(s) | | Ragnhild Myklebust | Norway |
| 3rd place, bronze medalist(s) | | Kirsti Hooeen | Norway |

The Women's 500 metres grade II event was one of the events held in Ice sledge speed racing at the 1988 Winter Paralympics.

In total, five competitors from three nations competed in the event. All three medals were won by Norwegian competitors.

== Results ==
=== Final ===
| Rank | Athletes | Time |
|---|---|---|
| 1st place, gold medalist(s) | Sylva Olsen (NOR) | 1:15.95 |
| 2nd place, silver medalist(s) | Ragnhild Myklebust (NOR) | 1:20.75 |
| 3rd place, bronze medalist(s) | Kirsti Hooeen (NOR) | 1:24.67 |
| | Gerda Lampers (NED) | 1:35.31 |
| | Lahja Haemaelaeinen (FIN) | 1:37.79 |
