= Biathlon at the 2002 Winter Paralympics =

Biathlon at the VIII Paralympic Winter Games

Biathlon at the 2002 Winter Paralympics consisted of six events, three for men and three for women.

== Medal table ==
Rank	Nation	Gold medal	Silver medal	Bronze medal	Total
1	Germany (GER)	3	0	1	4
2	Norway (NOR)	1	1	0	2
3	Netherlands (NED)	1	0	0	1
3	Switzerland (SUI)	1	0	0	1
5	France (FRA)	0	1	1	2
5	Slovakia (SVK)	0	1	1	2
5	Ukraine (UKR)	0	1	1	2
8	Austria (AUT)	0	1	0	1
8	Russia (RUS)	0	1	0	1
10	Italy (ITA)	0	0	1	1
10	Poland (POL)	0	0	1	1
Total		6	6	6	18

== Medal summary ==
Men

- 7.5 km
  - Sitting
  - Standing
  - Visually impaired

Women

- 7.5 km
  - Sitting
  - Standing
  - Visually impaired

=== Men's events ===
Event	Class	Gold	Silver	Bronze
Men's 7.5 km free technique	blind	Wilhelm Brem; Guide: Olaf Gruhn; Germany	Marian Balaz; Guide: Michal Jurco; Slovakia	Frank Hoefle; Guide: Ulrich Zipfel; Germany
Men's 7.5 km free technique	standing	Josef Giesen; Germany	Valeriy Darovskikh; Russia	Jozef Mesik; Slovakia
Men's 7.5 km sitski		Ruedi Weber; Switzerland	Oliver Anthofer; Austria	Roland Ruepp; Italy

=== Women's events ===
Event	Class	Gold	Silver	Bronze
Women's 7.5 km free technique	blind	Verena Bentele; Guide: Ralph Schmidt; Germany	Tone Gravvold; Guide: Kristian Soersen; Norway	Emilie Tabouret; Guide: Lionel Bayon; France
Women's 7.5 km free technique	standing	Marjorie van de Bunt; Netherlands	Anne Floriet; France	Bogumila Kaploniak; Poland
Women's 7.5 km sitski		Ragnhild Myklebust; Norway	Olena Iurkovska; Ukraine	Svitlana Tryfonova; Ukraine

== See also ==
- Biathlon at the 2002 Winter Olympics
