= Ice sledge speed racing at the 1988 Winter Paralympics – Women's 1000 metres grade II =

Women's 1000 metres grade II at the IV Paralympic Winter Games
- Date: January 1988
- Competitors: 4 from 2 nations

Medalists
1st place, gold medalist(s)		Ragnhild Myklebust	Norway
2nd place, silver medalist(s)		Sylva Olsen	Norway
3rd place, bronze medalist(s)		Kirsti Hooeen	Norway

The Women's 1000 metres grade II event was one of the events held in Ice sledge speed racing at the 1988 Winter Paralympics.

In total, four competitors from two nations competed in the event. All three medals were won by Norwegian competitors.

== Results ==
=== Final ===
Rank	Athletes	Time
1st place, gold medalist(s)	Ragnhild Myklebust (NOR)	2:34.21
2nd place, silver medalist(s)	Sylva Olsen (NOR)	2:37.30
3rd place, bronze medalist(s)	Kirsti Hooeen (NOR)	2:55.08
	Gerda Lampers (NED)	3:02.16
