= Biathlon at the 1988 Winter Paralympics =

Biathlon at the IV Paralympic Winter Games

Paralympic symbol (1988-1994)

Biathlon at the 1988 Winter Paralympics consisted of three events for men.

== Medal table ==
Rank	Nation	Gold medal	Silver medal	Bronze medal	Total
1	Finland (FIN)	1	1	1	3
2	Norway (NOR)	1	0	1	2
2	Sweden (SWE)	1	0	1	2
4	Austria (AUT)	0	1	0	1
4	Switzerland (SUI)	0	1	0	1
Total		3	3	3	9

== Medal summary ==
The competition event was:

- 7.5 km: men

The event had separate standing classifications:

- LW2 - standing: single leg amputation above the knee
- LW4 - standing: single leg amputation below the knee
- LW6/8 - standing: single arm amputation

Event	Class	Gold	Silver	Bronze
Men's 7.5 km	LW2	Per-Erik Larsson; Sweden	Christoph Andres; Switzerland	Pertti Sankilampi; Finland
Men's 7.5 km	LW4	Svein Lilleberg; Norway	Kalervo Pieksämäki; Finland	Svein Tore Fauskrud; Norway
Men's 7.5 km	LW6/8	Jouko Grip; Finland	Wolfgang Pickl; Austria	Rune Karlsson; Sweden

== See also ==
- Biathlon at the 1988 Winter Olympics
