= Yoshihiro Nitta =

Yoshihiro Nitta may refer to:

- Yoshihiro Nitta (philosopher) (新田義弘, born 1929), Japanese philosopher
- Yoshihiro Nitta (skier) (新田佳浩, born 1980), Japanese Paralympic skier and biathlete
