= Alpine skiing at the 1988 Winter Paralympics – Women's slalom LW6/8 =

Women's slalom LW6/8 at the IV Paralympic Winter Games
- Dates: January 1988
- Competitors: 5 from 4 nations

Medalists
| 1st place, gold medalist(s) | | Martina Altenberger | Austria |
| 2nd place, silver medalist(s) | | Gunilla Ahren | Sweden |
| 3rd place, bronze medalist(s) | | Eszbieta Dadok | Poland |

The women's slalom LW6/8 was one of the events held in Alpine skiing at the 1988 Winter Paralympics in Innsbruck.

In total five competitors from four nations competed.

== Results ==
=== Final ===
| Rank | Athlete | Time |
|---|---|---|
| 1st place, gold medalist(s) | Martina Altenberger (AUT) | 1:15.63 |
| 2nd place, silver medalist(s) | Gunilla Ahren (SWE) | 1:19.09 |
| 3rd place, bronze medalist(s) | Eszbieta Dadok (POL) | 1:37.46 |
| | Kathy Pitcher (USA) | DSQ |
| | Nancy Gustafson (USA) | DNF |
