= Eugen Wilhelm =

Austrian cross-country skier

Sport
- Country: Austria
- Sport: Cross-country skiing
Medal record
Paralympic Games
Bronze medal – third place	1976 Örnsköldsvik	3x10 km Relay III-IV B

Eugen Wilhelm is an Austrian cross-country skier. He represented Austria at the 1976 Winter Paralympics held in Örnsköldsvik, Sweden and he competed in three events in cross-country skiing.

He won the bronze medal in the Men's 3x10 km Relay III-IV B event together with Wolfgang Pickl and Josef Scheiber.
