= Tone Gravvold =

Norwegian athlete

Personal information
- Born: 19 June 1977 (age 49) Surnadal Municipality, Norway

Sport
- Country: Norway
- Sport: cross-country skiing, biathlon, cycling, goalball
Medal record
Cross-country skiing
Representing Norway
Paralympic Games
| Gold medal – first place | 1994 Lillehammer | 5km free B2 |
| Gold medal – first place | 1998 Nagano | 5km free B2-3 |
| Gold medal – first place | 1998 Nagano | 3x2.5km relay open |
| Gold medal – first place | 2002 Salt Lake City | 3x2.5km relay open |
| Silver medal – second place | 2002 Salt Lake City | 7.5km |
| Bronze medal – third place | 1994 Lillehammer | 15km classical B2 |
| Bronze medal – third place | 1998 Nagano | 15km classical B1-3 |
| Bronze medal – third place | 2002 Salt Lake City | 5km classical B2-3 |

Tone Gravvold (born 19 June 1977) is a Norwegian cross-country skier and biathlete, and since 1998, also a cyclist. She won a dozen medals in the Paralympic Games in which she competed at between 1994 and 2006. In 2019, she was named Sportsperson of the Century for Møre og Romsdal.

For the Oslo Vikings, she has competed in the Norwegian championships in goalball for the visually impaired. She has retinitis pigmentosa and competes in the B1 and B2 classes, has been on the board of the RP association since 2009, and works as a psychologist, in 2015 working for the National Centre for Rheumatological Rehabilitation at the Diakonhjemmet.

== Titles ==
=== Cross-country skiing ===
- 1994 Winter Paralympics (Lillehammer):
  - Cross-country skiing: Gold in 5 km freestyle (B2), bronze in 10 km classic (B2)
  - Biathlon: 8th in 7.5 freestyle (B1-3).
- 1998 Winter Paralympics (Nagano): Gold in 5 km freestyle (B2-3), bronze in 15 km classic (B1-3), gold in relay 3x2.5 km (open) with Frode Nilssen as lead.
- 2002 Paralympic Winter Games (Salt Lake City):
  - Cross-country skiing: Bronze in 5 km classic (B2-3), gold in relay 3x2.5 (open)
  - Biathlon: Silver in 7.5 km freestyle (blind)
- Cross-country skiing at the 2006 Winter Paralympics (Torino): 11th in 10 km and 10th in 15 km (blind and visually impaired in the same class). Led by Fredrik Thomassen.

=== Cycling ===
- 2000 Paralympic Games (Sydney): Nr. 9 in 1000 m track (1.11.806), nr. 10 in duotempo, nr. 6 in sprint (11,861). Per Olve Tobiassen was pilot.
- 2004 Paralympic Games (Athens): (B1-3):
  - Road: Nr. 2 in tandem tempo, nr. 5 in tandem joint start and nr. 4 combined. With Ingunn Bollerud pilot.
  - Track cycling: Nr. 4 in 3000 m (3.46.581) and nr. 5 in 1000 m (1.13.507). With May Britt Hartwell as pilot.
- European cycling championships:
  - 2005 (Alkmaar, Netherlands): Gold in tempotandem and bronze in joint start tandem with Ingunn Bollerud as pilot
- Birken: Record for tandem cycle 3.13 (2000). Pilot Per Olve Tobiassen. 4 career medal with the same pilot.
- NM: 2000 Norwegian Champion road tandem. Pilot Per Olve Tobiassen

== Honours ==
- Erling Stordahls ærespris 2004
- Sportsperson of the Century Møre og Romsdal, 2019.
