= Manzer =

Manzer is a surname. Notable people with the surname include:

- Linda Manzer (born 1952), Canadian master luthier
- Lorna Manzer (fl. 1970s–1980s), Canadian Paralympic skier
- Roy Manzer (1896–1956), Canadian World War I flying ace
