= Finland at the 2022 Winter Paralympics =

- Flag of Finland
- IPC code: FIN
- NPC: Finnish Paralympic Committee
- Website: www.paralympia.fi/en

in Beijing, China 4 March 2022 – 13 March 2022
- Competitors: 6 (5 men and 1 woman) in 3 sports
- Flag bearers: Inkki Inola; Maiju Laurila
- Medals Ranked 13th: Gold 2 Silver 2 Bronze 0 Total 4

Winter Paralympics appearances (overview)
- 1976; 1980; 1984; 1988; 1992; 1994; 1998; 2002; 2006; 2010; 2014; 2018; 2022; 2026

Finland competed at the 2022 Winter Paralympics in Beijing, China which took place between 4–13 March 2022.

== Medalists ==
The following Finnish competitors won medals at the games. In the discipline sections below, the medalists' names are bolded.

Medal	Name	Sport	Event	Date
Gold	Santeri Kiiveri	Alpine skiing	Men's giant slalom, standing	10 March
Gold	Matti Suur-Hamari	Snowboarding	Snowboard cross, SB-LL2	7 March
Silver	Matti Suur-Hamari	Snowboarding	Snowboard banked slalom, SB-LL2	11 March
Silver	Santeri Kiiveri	Alpine skiing	Men's super combined, standing	7 March

**Medals by sport**
**Sport**	1st place, gold medalist(s)	2nd place, silver medalist(s)	3rd place, bronze medalist(s)	**Total**
Alpine skiing	1	1	0	**2**
Snowboarding	1	1	0	**2**
**Total**	**2**	**2**	**0**	**4**

**Medals by gender**
**Gender**	1st place, gold medalist(s)	2nd place, silver medalist(s)	3rd place, bronze medalist(s)	**Total**
Male	2	2	0	**4**
Female	0	0	0	**0**
Mixed	0	0	0	**0**
**Total**	**2**	**2**	**0**	**4**

== Competitors ==
The following is the list of number of competitors participating at the Games per sport/discipline.

Sport	Men	Women	Total
Alpine skiing	1	1	2
Cross-country skiing	1	0	1
Snowboarding	3	0	3
Total	5	1	6

== Alpine skiing ==
Santeri Kiiveri and Maiju Laurila competed in alpine skiing.

Athlete	Event	Run 1		Run 2		Total	
Athlete	Event	Time	Rank	Time	Rank	Time	Rank
**Santeri Kiiveri**	Men's downhill standing	—N/a				1:18.92	8
**Santeri Kiiveri**	Men's giant slalom, standing	57.98	2	57.42	3	1:55.40	1st place, gold medalist(s)
**Santeri Kiiveri**	Men's super combined	1:12.95	3	41.53	6	1:54.48	2nd place, silver medalist(s)
**Santeri Kiiveri**	Men's super-G standing	—N/a				1:13.40	9
**Santeri Kiiveri**	Men's slalom, standing	43.66	4	Did not finish			
Maiju Laurila	Women's giant slalom, sitting	1:23.25	10	1:27.98	10	2:51.23	10
Maiju Laurila	Women's slalom, sitting	Did not finish					

== Cross-country skiing ==
Inkki Inola competed in cross-country skiing.

Men's distance

Athlete	Event	Final	
Athlete	Event	Time	Rank
Inkki Inola; Guide: Jari Huhta	12.5 km free visually impaired	39:06.4	12
Inkki Inola; Guide: Jari Huhta	20 km classical visually impaired	1:01:34.4	4

Sprint

Athlete	Event	Qualification		Semifinal		Final	
Athlete	Event	Time	Rank	Time	Rank	Time	Rank
Inkki Inola; Guide: Jari Huhta	1.5 km sprint visually impaired	2:55.47	13	Did not advance			

== Snowboarding ==
Three snowboarders represented Finland.

Banked slalom

Athlete	Event	Run 1	Run 2	Best	Rank
Tomi Taskinen	Men's SB-LL1	1:49.32	DNF	1:49.32	16
**Matti Suur-Hamari**	Men's SB-LL2	1:09.98	1:10.84	1:09.98	2nd place, silver medalist(s)
Matti Sairanen	Men's SB-UL	1:23.98	1:23.31	1:23.31	17

Snowboard cross

Athlete	Event	Qualification			Quarterfinal	Semifinal	Final	
Athlete	Event	Run 1	Run 2	Rank	Position	Position	Position	Rank
**Matti Suur-Hamari**	Men's SB-LL2	1:01.93	**1:01.73**	1 **Q**	1 **Q**	1 **FA**	1	1st place, gold medalist(s)
Matti Sairanen	Men's SB-UL	1:14.99	**1:13.52**	18	Did not advance			

Qualification legend: Q - Qualify to next round; FA - Qualify to medal final; FB - Qualify to consolation final

== See also ==
- Finland at the Paralympics
- Finland at the 2022 Winter Olympics
