= Finland at the 2026 Winter Paralympics =

- Flag of Finland
- IPC code: FIN
- NPC: Finnish Paralympic Committee

in Milan & Cortina d'Ampezzo, Italy 6 March 2026 – 15 March 2026
- Competitors: 4 (2 men and 2 women) in 3 sports
- Medals Ranked 20th: Gold 0 Silver 2 Bronze 0 Total 2

Winter Paralympics appearances (overview)
- 1976; 1980; 1984; 1988; 1992; 1994; 1998; 2002; 2006; 2010; 2014; 2018; 2022; 2026

Finland will compete at the 2026 Winter Paralympics in Milan & Cortina d'Ampezzo, Italy, which will take place between 6–15 March 2026.

== Medallists ==
Medal	Name	Sport	Event	Date
Silver	Inkki Inola; Guide: Reetu Inkilä	Para cross-country skiing	Men's 10 kilometre classical, visually impaired	11 March
Silver	Nette Kiviranta	Para alpine skiing	Women's slalom, sitting	14 March

== Competitors ==
The following is the list of number of competitors participating at the Games per sport/discipline.

Sport	Men	Women	Total
Para alpine skiing	0	2	2
Para cross-country skiing	1	0	1
Para snowboard	1	0	1
Total	2	2	4

== Para alpine skiing ==
Athlete	Class	Event	Run 1		Run 2		Total	
Athlete	Class	Event	Time	Rank	Time	Rank	Time	Rank
Nette Kiviranta	LW11	Women's giant slalom, sitting	1:19.11	4	1:17.30	3	2:36.41	4
Nette Kiviranta	LW11	Women's slalom, sitting	43.18	3	44.78	3	1:27.96	2nd place, silver medalist(s)
Maiju Laurila	LW12-1	Women's slalom, sitting	58.74	12	56.74	8	1:55.48	11

== Para cross-country skiing ==
Athlete	Class	Event	Qualification		Semifinal		Final	
Athlete	Class	Event	Time	Rank	Time	Rank	Time	Rank
Inkki Inola; Guide: Reetu Inkilä	NS3	Men's sprint classical, visually impaired	2:36.87	8 Q	2:34.50	4	Did not advance	
Inkki Inola; Guide: Reetu Inkilä	NS3	Men's 10 km classical, visually impaired	—N/a				29:52.3	2nd place, silver medalist(s)
Inkki Inola; Guide: Reetu Inkilä	NS3	Men's 20 km freestyle, visually impaired	—N/a				47:12.3	9

== Para snowboard ==
Banked slalom

Athlete	Event	Run 1	Run 2	Best	Rank
Matti Sairanen	Men's banked slalom, SB-UL	1:09.30	1:09.98	1:09.30	20

== See also ==
- Finland at the Paralympics
- Finland at the 2026 Winter Olympics
