= Umback =

Umback is a surname. Notable people with the surname include:

- Katie Umback (born 1973), Australian para-equestrian
- Kim Umback, Canadian cross-country skier
