= Ragnhild Myklebust =

Norwegian Paralympic athlete

Medal record

Representing Norway

Paralympic Games

Biathlon
Bronze medal – third place	1994 Lillehammer	7.5 km free technique
Gold medal – first place	1998 Nagano	7.5 km sitski
Gold medal – first place	2002 Salt Lake City	7.5 km sitski

Cross-country skiing
Gold medal – first place	1988 Innsbruck	2.5 km
Gold medal – first place	1988 Innsbruck	5 km
Gold medal – first place	1992 Albertville	2.5 km
Gold medal – first place	1992 Albertville	5 km
Gold medal – first place	1994 Lillehammer	2.5 km sitski
Gold medal – first place	1994 Lillehammer	5 km sitski
Gold medal – first place	1994 Lillehammer	10 km sitski
Gold medal – first place	1994 Lillehammer	3×2.5 km relay
Gold medal – first place	1998 Nagano	2.5 km sitski
Gold medal – first place	1998 Nagano	5 km sitski
Gold medal – first place	1998 Nagano	10 km sitski
Gold medal – first place	1998 Nagano	3×2.5 km relay
Gold medal – first place	2002 Salt Lake City	2.5 km sitski
Gold medal – first place	2002 Salt Lake City	5 km sitski
Gold medal – first place	2002 Salt Lake City	10 km sitski
Gold medal – first place	2002 Salt Lake City	3×2.5 km relay

Ice sledge speed racing
Gold medal – first place	1988 Innsbruck	100 m
Gold medal – first place	1988 Innsbruck	700 m
Gold medal – first place	1988 Innsbruck	1000 m
Silver medal – second place	1988 Innsbruck	500 m
Gold medal – first place	1994 Lillehammer	700 m
Silver medal – second place	1994 Lillehammer	100 m
Silver medal – second place	1994 Lillehammer	500 m
Bronze medal – third place	1994 Lillehammer	1000 m

Ragnhild Myklebust, PLY is a Norwegian Nordic skier and multiple gold medal winner at the Paralympic Games. To date, she holds the record for the most ever medals won at the Winter Paralympics, having won 27 medals, of which 22 were gold.

== Biography ==
Myklebust won five gold medals and one silver at the 1988 Winter Paralympics, two gold at the 1992 Games, five gold, two silver and two bronze in 1994, five gold in Nagano and five gold in 2002. She has won Paralympic medals in short, middle and long-distance cross-country races, relays, the biathlon, and ice sledge racing.

== See also ==
- Athletes with most gold medals in one event at the Paralympic Games
