= 1988 Paralympics =

1988 Paralympics may refer to:

- 1988 Summer Paralympics
- 1988 Winter Paralympics
