= Ukraine at the 2002 Winter Paralympics =

- IPC code: UKR
- NPC: National Sports Committee for the Disabled of Ukraine
- Website: www.paralympic.org.ua

in Salt Lake City
- Competitors: 10
- Medals Ranked 18th: Gold 0 Silver 6 Bronze 6 Total 12

Winter Paralympics appearances (overview)
- 1998; 2002; 2006; 2010; 2014; 2018; 2022; 2026

Other related appearances
- Soviet Union (1988); Unified Team (1992)

Ukraine competed at the 2002 Winter Paralympics in Salt Lake City, United States. 10 competitors from Ukraine won 12 medals, 6 silver and 6 bronze, and finished 18th in the medal table.

== Medalists ==
Medal	Name	Sport	Event
Silver	Olena Iurkovska	Biathlon	Women's 7.5 km sitski
Silver	Oleh Munts	Cross-country skiing	Men's 5 km classical technique B1
Silver	Oleh Munts	Cross-country skiing	Men's 10 km free technique B1
Silver	Svitlana Tryfonova	Cross-country skiing	Women's 2.5 km sitski
Silver	Svitlana Tryfonova	Cross-country skiing	Women's 5 km sitski
Silver	Svitlana Tryfonova	Cross-country skiing	Women's 10 km sitski
Bronze	Svitlana Tryfonova	Biathlon	Women's 7.5 km sitski
Bronze	Vitaliy Lukyanenko	Cross-country skiing	Men's 5 km classical technique B3
Bronze	Mykola Ovcharenko	Cross-country skiing	Men's 10 km sitski LW12
Bronze	Olena Iurkovska	Cross-country skiing	Women's 2.5 km sitski
Bronze	Olena Iurkovska	Cross-country skiing	Women's 5 km sitski
Bronze	Olena Iurkovska	Cross-country skiing	Women's 10 km sitski

== See also ==
- Ukraine at the Paralympics
- Ukraine at the 2002 Winter Olympics
