= Finland at the 1984 Winter Paralympics =

- IPC code: FIN
- NPC: Finnish Paralympic Committee
- Website: www.paralympia.fi
- Competitors: 30 (24 men and 6 women) in 3 sports
- Medals Ranked 2nd: Gold 19 Silver 9 Bronze 6 Total 34

Winter Paralympics appearances (overview)
- 1976; 1980; 1984; 1988; 1992; 1994; 1998; 2002; 2006; 2010; 2014; 2018; 2022; 2026

Finland competed at the 1984 Winter Paralympics held in Innsbruck, Austria. Thirty competitors (24 men and 6 women) from Finland won 34 medals, including 19 gold, 9 silver and 6 bronze medals. Finland finished 2nd in the medal table.

== Alpine skiing ==
Two athletes competed in alpine skiing:

- Kari Laakkonen competed in the Men's Downhill LW5/7 and Men's Giant Slalom LW5/7 events.
- Kari Tarvasaho competed in the Men's Downhill LW4 and Men's Giant Slalom LW4 events.

== Cross-country skiing ==
- (gold) Jouko Grip Men's Middle Distance 20 km LW6/8
- (gold) Jouko Grip, Veikko Jantunen, Kimmo Kettunen, Heikki Miettinen Men's 4x5 km Relay LW2-9
- (gold) Jouko Grip Men's Short Distance 10 km LW6/8
- (gold) Alli Hatva Women's Middle Distance 10 km LW6/8
- (gold) Alli Hatva Women's Short Distance 5 km LW6/8
- (gold) Veikko Jantunen Men's Short Distance 5 km LW4
- (gold) Samuli Kaemi Men's Middle Distance 10 km LW2
- (gold) Kyllikki Luhtapuro Women's Short Distance 5 km B2
- (gold) Liisa Maekelae Women's Short Distance 5 km LW4
- (gold) Kirsti Pennanen Women's Middle Distance 10 km B1
- (gold) Kirsti Pennanen Women's Short Distance 5 km B1
- (gold) Pertti Sankilampi Men's Short Distance 5 km LW2
- (silver) Samuli Kaemi Men's Short Distance 5 km LW2
- (silver) Samuli Kaemi, Lauri Moilanen, Pertti Sankilampi, Erkki Seppaenen Men's 4x5 km Relay LW2-9
- (silver) Ismo Alanko, Martti Juntunen, Mauno Sulisalo, Teuvo Talmia Men's 4x10 km Relay B1-2
- (silver) Martti Juntunen Men's Middle Distance 10 km B1
- (silver) Martti Juntunen Men's Short Distance 10 km B1
- (silver) Kimmo Kettunen Men's Short Distance 10 km LW6/8
- (silver) Kyllikki Luhtapuro Women's Middle Distance 10 km B2
- (silver) Liisa Maekelae Women's Middle Distance 10 km LW4
- (silver) Pertti Sankilampi Men's Middle Distance 10 km LW2
- (bronze) Tarja Hovinen Women's Short Distance 5 km B2
- (bronze) Veikko Jantunen Men's Middle Distance 10 km LW4
- (bronze) Heikki Miettinen Men's Short Distance 10 km LW6/8
- (bronze) Ari Mustonen Men's Short Distance 5 km LW2
- (bronze) Tauno Seppaenen Men's Middle Distance 10 km LW2
- (bronze) Mauno Sulisalo Men's Middle Distance 10 km B1

== Ice sledge speed racing ==
The medalists are:

- (gold) Lahja Haemaelaeinen Women's 100 m grade I
- (gold) Lahja Haemaelaeinen Women's 300 m grade I
- (gold) Lahja Haemaelaeinen Women's 500 m grade I
- (gold) Lahja Haemaelaeinen Women's 700 m grade I
- (gold) Veikko Puputti Men's 300 m grade I
- (gold) Veikko Puputti Men's 500 m grade I
- (gold) Veikko Puputti Men's 700 m grade I

== See also ==
- Finland at the Paralympics
- Finland at the 1984 Summer Paralympics
