= Canada at the 1976 Winter Paralympics =

- Flag of Canada
- IPC code: CAN
- NPC: Canadian Paralympic Committee
- Website: www.paralympic.ca

in Örnsköldsvik, Sweden 21-28 February 1976
- Competitors: 6 in 2 sports
- Medals Ranked 9th: Gold 2 Silver 0 Bronze 2 Total 4

Winter Paralympics appearances (overview)
- 1976; 1980; 1984; 1988; 1992; 1994; 1998; 2002; 2006; 2010; 2014; 2018; 2022; 2026

Canada competed at the inaugural 1976 Winter Paralympics in Örnsköldsvik, Sweden, 21 to 28 February 1976. Canada sent a team of six athletes (five men and one woman) in both sporting events: alpine skiing and cross-country skiing.

== Medallists ==
Medal	Name	Sport	Event
Gold	John Gow	Alpine skiing	Men's slalom IV A
Gold	Lorna Manzer	Cross-country skiing	Women's short distance 5 km II
Bronze	Lorna Manzer	Alpine skiing	Women's giant slalom II
Bronze	Lorna Manzer	Alpine skiing	Women's slalom II

== Alpine skiing ==
Men

Athlete	Event	Final	
Athlete	Event	Time	Rank
Rod Blackie	Slalom I	2:01.71	12
Gerry Butterfield	Slalom II	2:32.87	13
John Gow	Slalom IV A	1:36.13	1st place, gold medalist(s)
Don McGregor	Giant slalom I	4:26.41	11
Brent Munroe	Giant slalom I	4:09.43	10

Women

Athlete	Event	Final	
Athlete	Event	Time	Rank
Lorna Manzer	Giant slalom II	2:40.36	3rd place, bronze medalist(s)
Lorna Manzer	Slalom II	3:37.09	3rd place, bronze medalist(s)

== Cross-country skiing ==
Men

Athlete	Event	Final	
Athlete	Event	Time	Rank
Brent Munroe	Short distance 5 km II	38:59.0	17

Women

Athlete	Event	Final	
Athlete	Event	Time	Rank
Lorna Manzer	Short distance 5 km II	49:40.0	1st place, gold medalist(s)

== See also ==
- Canada at the 1976 Winter Olympics
- Canada at the Paralympics
