= Finland at the 2010 Winter Paralympics =

- IPC code: FIN
- NPC: Finnish Paralympic Committee
- Website: www.paralympia.fi/en

in Vancouver
- Competitors: 5 in 3 sports
- Flag bearer: Ilkka Tuomisto
- Medals Ranked 17th: Gold 0 Silver 1 Bronze 1 Total 2

Winter Paralympics appearances (overview)
- 1976; 1980; 1984; 1988; 1992; 1994; 1998; 2002; 2006; 2010; 2014; 2018; 2022; 2026

Finland will send a delegation to compete at the 2010 Winter Paralympics, in Vancouver. It will be fielding a total of five athletes (three men and two women), in alpine skiing, biathlon and cross-country skiing.

== Alpine skiing ==
The following athlete will be Finland's sole representative in alpine skiing:

Athlete	Event	Final					
Athlete	Event	Run 1	Run 2	Run 3	Total Time	Calculated Time	Rank
Katja Saarinen							

== Biathlon ==
The following two athletes will represent Finland in biathlon:

Athlete	Events	Final				
Athlete	Events	Real time	Missed shots	Factor %	Finish time	Rank
Maija Loytynoja						
Jarmo Ollanketo						

== Cross-country skiing ==
The following four athletes will represent Finland in cross-country skiing:

Athlete	Event	Final		
Athlete	Event	Time	Calculated Time	Rank
Rudolf Klemetti				
Maija Loytynoja				
Jarmo Ollanketo				
Ilkka Tuomisto				

== See also ==
- Finland at the 2010 Winter Olympics
- Finland at the Paralympics
