= Poland at the 2002 Winter Paralympics =

- IPC code: POL
- NPC: Polish Paralympic Committee
- Website: www.paralympic.org.pl

in Salt Lake City
- Competitors: 14 in 3 sports
- Medals Ranked 17th: Gold 1 Silver 0 Bronze 2 Total 3

Winter Paralympics appearances (overview)
- 1976; 1980; 1984; 1988; 1992; 1994; 1998; 2002; 2006; 2010; 2014; 2018; 2022; 2026

Poland competed at the 2002 Winter Paralympics in Salt Lake City, United States. A total of 14 competitors from Poland won 3 medals, 1 gold and 2 bronze, and finished 17th in the medal table.

== Medalists ==
=== Gold ===
- Wieslaw Fiedor - Cross-country skiing, 10 km Individual Classic LW12

=== Bronze ===
- Bogumiła Kapłoniak - Biathlon, 7,5 km Standing Pursuit
- Wieslaw Fiedor - Cross-country skiing, 5 km Individual Classic LW12

== Alpine skiing ==
Athlete	Event	Final			
Athlete	Event	Run	Rank	Calculated Time	Rank
Tomasz Gajos	Slalom LW6/8	1:54.47	14	1:55.74	14
Tomasz Gajos	Giant slalom LW6/8	DNF		DNF	
Tomasz Gajos	Super gigant LW6/8	1:27.04	14	1:27.04	14
Tomasz Juszczak	Slalom LW6/8	DNF		DNF	
Tomasz Juszczak	Giant slalom LW6/8	DNF		DNF	
Tomasz Juszczak	Super gigant LW6/8	1:28.15	15	1:28.15	15
Piotr Marek	Slalom LW6/8	1:49.60	12	1:50.81	12
Piotr Marek	Giant slalom LW6/8	2:30.30	11	2:30.30	11
Piotr Marek	Super gigant LW6/8	1:24.81	12	1:24.81	12
Ireneusz Słabicki	Slalom LW11	DNF		DNF	
Ireneusz Słabicki	Giant slalom LW11	DNF		DNF	
Ireneusz Słabicki	Super gigant LW11	1:49.78	12	2:12.58	12
Agata Striuzik	Slalom LW10-11	2:22.28	5	3:09.27	5
Agata Striuzik	Giant slalom LW10-12	2:52.90	5	3:26.76	5
Agata Striuzik	Super gigant LW10-12	1:34.93	10	1:54.53	10
Łukasz Szeliga	Slalom LW2	1:44.08	13	1:44.08	13
Łukasz Szeliga	Giant slalom LW2	2:33.22	11	2:46.13	11
Łukasz Szeliga	Super gigant LW2	1:25.34	14	1:32.63	14

== Biathlon ==
Athlete	Events	Final				
Athlete	Events	Time	Factor	Misses	Finish time	Rank
Wieslaw Fiedor	Sitting Pursuit	26:49.4	0	100	26:49.4	4
Grazyna Gron	Standing Pursuit	30:48.4	3	97	28:40.1	6
Bogumiła Kapłoniak	Standing Pursuit	27:49.7	3	97	25:35.8	3rd place, bronze medalist(s)
Piotr Kosewicz	Sitting Pursuit	32:34.8	2	85	35:58.6	23
Beata Pomietło	Sitting Pursuit	DNF				
Robert Wator	Sitting Pursuit	DNQ				

== Cross-country skiing ==
Athlete	Event	Final			
Athlete	Event	Real Time	Factor	Finish Time	Rank
Wieslaw Fiedor	Sitting 5 km Classic LW12	16:33.3	100	16:33.3	3rd place, bronze medalist(s)
Wieslaw Fiedor	Sitting 10 km Classic LW12	35:42.4	100	35:42.4	1st place, gold medalist(s)
Wieslaw Fiedor	Sitting 15 km Classic LW10-12	45:47.1	100	45:47.1	10
Grazyna Gron	Standing 5 km Classic	18:15.7	92	19:51.0	10
Grazyna Gron	Standing 10 km Free	37:38.0	97	38:47.9	8
Grazyna Gron	Standing 15 km Free	1:02:40.8	97	64:37.2	9
Bogumiła Kapłoniak	Standing 5 km Classic	17:21.1	92	18:51.7	7
Bogumiła Kapłoniak	Standing 10 km Free	34:46.9	97	35:51.5	6
Bogumiła Kapłoniak	Standing 15 km Free	53:46.8	97	55:26.6	6
Marcin Kos	Standing 5 km Classic LW5-9	13:31.6	77	17:34.1	9
Marcin Kos	Standing 10 km Free LW5-9	26:10.2	85	30:47.3	4
Marcin Kos	Standing 20 km Free	DNF			
Piotr Kosiewicz	Sitting 5 km Classic LW10	18:55.6	85	22:16.1	7
Piotr Kosiewicz	Sitting 10 km Classic Lw10	42:48.7	85	50:22.1	7
Beata Pomietło	Sitting 2,5 km Classic	10:32.6	100	10:32.6	9
Beata Pomietło	Sitting 5 km Classic	22:56.1	100	22:56.1	8
Beata Pomietło	Sitting 10 km Classic	39:16.2	100	39:16.2	10
Katarzyna Rogowiec	Standing 5 km Classic	15:34.0	77	20:13.0	4
Katarzyna Rogowiec	Standing 10 km Free	38:00.2	85	44:42.6	9
Robert Wator	Sitting 5 km Classic LW12	18:46.5	100	18:46.5	16
Robert Wator	Sitting 10 km Classic LW12	36:50.0	100	36:50.0	6
Katarzyna Rogowiec; Bogumiła Kapłoniak; Grazyna Gron	3 x 2.5 km Relay	—N/a		OVL	DNF

== See also ==
- Poland at the Paralympics
- Poland at the 2002 Winter Olympics
