= Finland at the 2006 Winter Paralympics =

- IPC code: FIN
- NPC: Finnish Paralympic Committee
- Website: www.paralympia.fi/en

in Turin
- Competitors: 7 in 2 sports
- Medals Ranked 20th: Gold 0 Silver 0 Bronze 0 Total 0

Winter Paralympics appearances (overview)
- 1976; 1980; 1984; 1988; 1992; 1994; 1998; 2002; 2006; 2010; 2014; 2018; 2022; 2026

Finland participated in the ninth Winter Paralympics in Turin, Italy.

Finland entered seven athletes in the following sports:

- Alpine skiing: 1 male, 1 female
- Nordic skiing: 3 male, 2 female

The country failed to win a single medal; it was the first time it failed to do so at the Winter Paralympics. Finland had once been among the dominant countries at the Winter Paralympic Games, finishing second or third at the first three editions of the Games, and remaining in the top 10 until 2002, included.

== Medalists ==
	(gold)	(silver)	(bronze)	Total
Finland	0	0	0	0

== See also ==
- 2006 Winter Paralympics
- Finland at the 2006 Winter Olympics
