= Sandra Lecour =

Canadian cross-country skier

Sport
- Country: Canada
- Sport: Cross-country skiing
Medal record
Paralympic Games
Gold medal – first place	1988 Innsbruck	5 km B2
Gold medal – first place	1988 Innsbruck	10 km B2
Bronze medal – third place	1988 Innsbruck	3x5 km relay B1-3

Sandra Lecour is a Canadian cross-country skier. She represented Canada at the 1984 Winter Paralympics and at the 1988 Winter Paralympics, both held in Innsbruck, Austria. In total she won two gold medals and one bronze medal.

She won the gold medal in the women's short distance 5 km B2 event and also in the women's long distance 10 km B2. She won the bronze medal together with Kim Umback and Tricia Lovegrove in the women's 3x5 km relay B1-3 event.
