= John Gow (skier) =

Canadian para-alpine skier

Personal information
- Born: August 13, 1946
- Died: October 8, 2024 (aged 78)

Sport
- Country: Canada
- Sport: Para-alpine skiing
Medal record
Paralympic Games
Gold medal – first place	1976 Örnsköldsvik	Slalom IV A

John Gow ( August 13, 1946 – October 8, 2024) was a Canadian para-alpine skier, resort executive, and survivor of a historic wilderness plane crash. He represented Canada at the 1976 Winter Paralympics in alpine skiing, where he won a gold medal in the Men's Slalom IV A event — the only event he competed in.

On April 15, 1969, in his early twenties, Gow survived the crash of a Cessna aircraft in the backcountry near what is now Kicking Horse Resort. The crash claimed the life of the pilot, but Gow, severely injured, crawled for five days through the rugged British Columbia wilderness to reach safety. As a result of severe frostbite sustained during the ordeal, he underwent a double amputation, losing both feet.

Determined to continue his passion for skiing, Gow taught himself to ski again using prosthetics. He later rose to become a prominent figure in the Canadian ski industry, CEO of Sunshine Village at the age of 29, and managing Silver Star Mountain Resort for nearly two decades.

Gow died on October 8, 2024, at Canmore General Hospital at the age of 78. He spent his final years in Canmore, Alberta, accompanied by his dog.

== See also ==
- List of Paralympic medalists in alpine skiing
