= Cross-country skiing at the 1976 Winter Paralympics =

Cross-country skiing at the I Paralympic Winter Games

Cross-country skiing at the 1976 Winter Paralympics consisted of 25 events, 15 for men and 10 for women.

== Medal table ==
Rank	Nation	Gold medal	Silver medal	Bronze medal	Total
1	Finland (FIN)	8	7	7	22
2	Norway (NOR)	7	3	2	12
3	Sweden (SWE)	6	7	7	20
4	West Germany (FRG)	2	5	4	11
5	Switzerland (SUI)	1	0	1	2
6	Canada (CAN)	1	0	0	1
7	Austria (AUT)	0	0	1	1
Total		25	22	22	69

== Medal summary ==
The competition events were:

- 5 km: men - women
- 10 km: men - women
- 15 km: men
- 3x5 km relay: men - women
- 3x10 km relay: men

Each event had separate standing, or visually impaired classifications:

- I - standing, single-leg amputation above the knee
- II - standing, single-leg amputation below the knee
- III - standing, single-arm amputation
- IV B - standing, double-arm amputation
- A - visually impaired, no functional vision
- B - visually impaired, under 10% functional vision

=== Men's events ===
Event	Class	Gold	Silver	Bronze
5 km - short distance	I	Pertti Sankilampi; Finland	Otto Malkki; Finland	Tauno Seppaenen; Finland
5 km - short distance	II	Bertil Lundmark; Sweden	Kalle Tiusanen; Finland	Erkki Kukkanen; Finland
5 km - short distance	III	Teuvo Sahi; Finland	Walter Klenk; West Germany	Edmund Zahner; West Germany
5 km - short distance	IV B	Reino Vesander; Finland	Ernst Schwarz; West Germany	Adolf Fritsche; West Germany
10 km - short distance	A	Germain Oberli; Switzerland	Jarle Johnsen; Norway	Mauno Sulisalo; Finland
10 km - short distance	B	Morten Langeroed; Norway	Sven-Ivar Martin; Sweden	Terje Hansen; Norway
10 km - middle distance	I	Pertti Sankilampi; Finland	Otto Malkki; Finland	Tauno Seppaenen; Finland
10 km - middle distance	II	Bertil Lundmark; Sweden	Kalle Tiusanen; Finland	Erkki Kukkanen; Finland
10 km - middle distance	III	Teuvo Sahi; Finland	Edmund Zahner; West Germany	Raimo Hiiri; Finland
10 km - middle distance	IV B	Reino Vesander; Finland	Adolf Fritsche; West Germany	Ernst Schwarz; West Germany
15 km - middle distance	A	Jarle Johnsen; Norway	Ingemar Lundquist; Sweden	Germain Oberli; Switzerland
15 km - middle distance	B	Morten Langeroed; Norway	Sven-Ivar Martin; Sweden	Terje Hansen; Norway
3×5 km relay	I-II	Finland (FIN); Otto Malkki; Pertti Sankilampi; Kalle Tiusanen	Sweden (SWE); Bertil Lundmark; Kalevi Mattila; Sven-Olof Tornvall	West Germany (FRG); Hermann Heckel; Helmut Kaidisch; Siegfried Loose
3×10 km relay	A-B	Norway (NOR); Terje Hansen; Jarle Johnsen; Morten Langeroed	Finland (FIN); Martti Juntunen; Manu Laakso; Matti Ojanen	Sweden (SWE); Yngve Eriksson; Ingemar Lundquist; Sven-Ivar Martin
3×10 km relay	III-IV B	Finland (FIN); Raimo Hiiri; Teuvo Sahi; Arvo Stahl	West Germany (FRG); Walter Klenk; Ludwig Wagner; Edmund Zahner	Austria (AUT); Wolfgang Pickl; Josef Scheiber; Eugen Wilhelm

=== Women's events ===
Event	Class	Gold	Silver	Bronze
5 km - short distance	A	Birgitta Sund; Sweden	Gunhild Sundstrom; Sweden	Marianne Edfeldt; Sweden
5 km - short distance	B	Karin Gustavsson; Sweden	Reidun Laengen; Norway	Astrid Nilsson; Sweden
5 km - short distance	I	Vigdis Bente Mordre; Norway	None	None
5 km - short distance	II	Lorna Manzer; Canada	None	None
5 km - short distance	III	Dorothea Neuweiler; West Germany	Aino Turpeinen; Finland	Ellen Sjodin; Sweden
10 km - middle distance	A	Birgitta Sund; Sweden	Gunhild Sundstrom; Sweden	Marianne Edfeldt; Sweden
10 km - middle distance	B	Reidun Laengen; Norway	Astrid Nilsson; Sweden	Karin Gustavsson; Sweden
10 km - middle distance	I	Vigdis Bente Mordre; Norway	None	None
10 km - middle distance	III	Dorothea Neuweiler; West Germany	Aino Turpeinen; Finland	Ellen Sjodin; Sweden
3×5 km relay	A-B	Sweden (SWE); Karin Gustavsson; Astrid Nilsson; Birgitta Sund	Norway (NOR); Aud Berntsen; Aud Grundvik; Reidun Laengen	Finland (FIN); Ella Kinnunen; Sirkka Sulisalo; Matleena Talonen

== See also ==
- Cross-country skiing at the 1976 Winter Olympics
