= Robin McKeever =

Canadian Paralympic cross-country skier (born 1973)

- Robin McKeever (left)

Medal record

Representing Canada

Cross-country skiing

Paralympic Games
Gold medal – first place	2010 Vancouver	1km Sprint Visually Impaired
Gold medal – first place	2010 Vancouver	10km Classic Visually Impaired
Gold medal – first place	2010 Vancouver	20km Freestyle Visually Impaired
Gold medal – first place	2006 Torino	5km Freestyle Visually Impaired
Gold medal – first place	2006 Torino	10km Classic Visually Impaired
Gold medal – first place	2002 Salt Lake City	5km Classic Visually Impaired
Gold medal – first place	2002 Salt Lake City	10km Freestyle Visually Impaired
Silver medal – second place	2006 Torino	20km Classic Visually Impaired
Silver medal – second place	2002 Salt Lake City	20km Freestyle Visually Impaired

Biathlon
Bronze medal – third place	2006 Torino	7.5km Visually Impaired Biathlon

Robin McKeever (born April 8, 1973) is a Canadian Paralympic cross-country skier.

== Biography ==
Born in Calgary, Alberta, McKeever participated in cross-country skiing at the 1998 Winter Olympics in Nagano.

McKeever is the sighted guide for his brother Brian McKeever, Canada's most decorated Winter Paralympian, from 2001 until 2014. The brothers raced together and won two gold and one silver at the 2002 Paralympic Winter Games in Salt Lake City. At the 2006 Games in Turin, he and his brother took two gold, one silver, and a bronze medal in cross-country skiing and biathlon. The duo won three gold medals at the 2010 Vancouver Winter Paralympics. He is the Para-Nordic ski coach for Cross Country Canada since November 2010.

In February 2022 the brothers' achievements were celebrated in Toyota's Super Bowl ad "Brothers", part of a global ad campaign titled "Start Your Impossible", which told their inspirational life story, from a childhood biking the hilly streets of Calgary and learning to ski, being motivated by their hometown 1988 Calgary Winter Olympics to aim for the national ski team, facing Brian's loss of vision as a teenager and ultimately winning 10 Paralympic medals together.

== Awards and honours ==
In 2011, McKeever was inducted into the Canadian Disability Hall of Fame alongside his brother Brian.
