= Finland at the 1998 Winter Paralympics =

- IPC code: FIN
- NPC: Finnish Paralympic Committee
- Website: www.paralympia.fi/en

in Nagano
- Competitors: 21
- Medals Ranked 9th: Gold 7 Silver 5 Bronze 7 Total 19

Winter Paralympics appearances (overview)
- 1976; 1980; 1984; 1988; 1992; 1994; 1998; 2002; 2006; 2010; 2014; 2018; 2022; 2026

Finland competed at the 1998 Winter Paralympics in Nagano, Japan. 21 competitors from Finland won 19 medals including 7 gold, 5 silver and 7 bronze and finished 9th in the medal table.

== See also ==
- Finland at the Paralympics
- Finland at the 1998 Winter Olympics
