= Finland at the 1976 Winter Paralympics =

- IPC code: FIN
- NPC: Finnish Paralympic Committee
- Website: www.paralympia.fi/en

in Örnsköldsvik
- Competitors: 26 in 1 sport
- Medals Ranked 3rd: Gold 8 Silver 7 Bronze 7 Total 22

Winter Paralympics appearances (overview)
- 1976; 1980; 1984; 1988; 1992; 1994; 1998; 2002; 2006; 2010; 2014; 2018; 2022; 2026

Finland participated in the inaugural Winter Paralympic Games in 1976 in Örnsköldsvik, Sweden. The country was represented by 26 athletes (22 men and 4 women). This was the second largest delegation at the Örnsköldsvik Games, behind West Germany's - larger than that of the host country. Finns competed exclusively in cross-country skiing.

Previously, Finland had competed at three editions of the Summer Paralympics (in 1960, 1968 and 1972), and had fared modestly, with a total of four medals (of which one gold). The country's performance at the inaugural Winter Games was thus a significant improvement, revealing Finland as a major Winter Paralympics power. The country swept up 22 medals (eight gold, seven silver and seven bronze), and finished third on the overall medal table. It would go on to finish second in 1980 and 1984, before beginning a slow but steady decline.

Finland's gold medallists at the Örnsköldsvik Games were:

- the men's 3x10km Relay team (categories III-IV B): Raimo Hiiri, Teuvo Sahi and Arvo Stahl
- the men's 3x5km Relay team (categories I-II): Otto Malkki, Pertti Sankilampi and Kalle Tiusanen
- Teuvo Sahi in the men's Middle Distance 10 km (III), and in the men's Short Distance 5 km (III)
- Pertti Sankilampi in the men's Middle Distance 10 km (I) and in the men's Short Distance 5 km (I)
- Reino Vesander in the men's Middle Distance 10 km (IV B) and in the men's Short Distance 5 km (IV B)

== See also ==
- Finland at the 1976 Winter Olympics
- Finland at the 1976 Summer Paralympics
