= Karl Tabouret =

French Para cross-country skier and biathlete (born 2003)

Personal information
- Born: 3 May 2003 (age 23) Albertville, Savoie, France

Sport
- Country: France
- Sport: Para Nordic skiing (Para cross-country skiing and Para biathlon)
- Disability class: LW3
- Club: Albertville Handisport
Medal record
Men's Para cross-country skiing
Representing France
Paralympic Games
Gold medal – first place	2026 Milano Cortina	10 km standing
World Championships
Gold medal – first place	2025 Trondheim	Classic sprint standing

Karl Tabouret (born 3 May 2003) is a French Para cross-country skier and biathlete.

== Career ==
Tabouret competed at the FIS Nordic World Ski Championships 2025 and won a gold medal in the classic sprint with a time of 3:46.86. This marked the first time that para cross-country athletes raced in the same stadium and on the same day as their able-bodied counterparts.

In February 2026, he was selected to represent France at the 2026 Winter Paralympics. He won a gold medal in the 10 kilometre classical standing event with a time of 27:10.7.
