= Finland at the 1992 Winter Paralympics =

- IPC code: FIN
- NPC: Finnish Paralympic Committee
- Website: www.paralympia.fi/en

in Tignes-Albertville
- Competitors: 17
- Medals Ranked 5th: Gold 7 Silver 3 Bronze 4 Total 14

Winter Paralympics appearances (overview)
- 1976; 1980; 1984; 1988; 1992; 1994; 1998; 2002; 2006; 2010; 2014; 2018; 2022; 2026

Finland competed at the 1992 Winter Paralympics in Tignes/Albertville, France. 17 competitors from Finland won 14 medals including 7 gold, 3 silver and 4 bronze and finished 5th in the medal table.

== See also ==
- Finland at the Paralympics
- Finland at the 1992 Winter Olympics
