= Marian Susitz =

Austrian cross-country skier

Sport
- Country: Austria
- Sport: Cross-country skiing
Medal record
Paralympic Games
Silver medal – second place	1988 Innsbruck	3x5 km relay B1-3
Bronze medal – third place	1988 Innsbruck	Short distance 5 km B2

Marian Susitz is an Austrian cross-country skier. She represented Austria at the 1988 Winter Paralympics. She competed in cross-country skiing and she won two medals: the silver medal in the women's 3x5 km relay B1-3 event and the bronze medal in the women's short distance 5 km B2 event.
