= Poland at the 1988 Winter Paralympics =

- IPC code: POL
- NPC: Polish Paralympic Committee
- Website: www.paralympic.org.pl

in Innsbruck
- Competitors: 18 in 3 sports
- Medals Ranked 12th: Gold 1 Silver 1 Bronze 6 Total 8

Winter Paralympics appearances (overview)
- 1976; 1980; 1984; 1988; 1992; 1994; 1998; 2002; 2006; 2010; 2014; 2018; 2022; 2026

Poland competed at the 1988 Winter Paralympics in Innsbruck, Austria. 13 competitors from Poland won 8 medals and finished 12th in the medal table.

== Medalists ==
=== Gold ===
- Marcin Kos - Cross-country skiing, Standing 15 km Individual Free LW5/7

=== Silver ===
- Marcin Kos - Cross-country skiing, Standing 5 km Individual Classic LW5/7

=== Bronze ===
- Elżbieta Dadok - Alpine skiing, Slalom LW6/8
- Elżbieta Dadok - Alpine skiing, giant slalom LW6/8
- Franciszek Tracz - Alpine skiing, Downhill LW3
- Jan Kołodziej - Cross-country skiing, Standing 5 km Individual Classic LW3/9
- Jan Kołodziej - Cross-country skiing, Standing 10 km Individual Free LW3/9
- Jerzy Szlezak - Cross-country skiing, Standing 15 km Individual Free LW5/7

== Alpine skiing ==
Athlete	Event	Final			
Athlete	Event	Run	Rank	Calculated Time	Rank
Elżbieta Dadok	Slalom LW6/8	1:37.46	3	1:37.46	3rd place, bronze medalist(s)
Elżbieta Dadok	Giant slalom LW6/8	2:06.05	3	2:06.05	3rd place, bronze medalist(s)
Elżbieta Dadok	Downhill LW6/8	1:30.75	5	1:30.75	5
Stanisław Dobija	Slalom LW6/8	1:35.69	13	1:35.69	13
Stanisław Dobija	Giant slalom LW6/8	2:17.84	16	2:17.84	16
Stanisław Dobija	Downhill LW6/8	1:27.02	20	1:27.02	20
Henryk Gruszczyński	Slalom LW6/8	DNF		DNF	
Henryk Gruszczyński	Giant slalom LW6/8	2:01.79	14	2:01.79	14
Henryk Gruszczyński	Downhill LW6/8	1:27.09	21	1:27.09	21
Franciszek Tracz	Slalom LW3	DNF		DNF	
Franciszek Tracz	Giant slalom LW3	2:24.62	4	2:24.62	4
Franciszek Tracz	Downhill LW3	1:38.71	3	1:38.71	3rd place, bronze medalist(s)
Maciej Rakowski	Slalom LW5/7	1:38.39	7	1:38.39	7
Maciej Rakowski	Giant slalom LW5/7	2:17.93	9	2:17.93	9
Maciej Rakowski	Downhill LW5/7	1:29.07	10	1:29.07	10

== Biathlon ==
Athlete	Events	Final				
Athlete	Events	Time	Misses	Factor	Finish time	Rank
Marian Damian	Sitting Pursuit LW6/8	34:35.5	4	100	34:35.5	8

== Cross‑country skiing ==
Athlete	Event	Final	
Athlete	Event	Finish Time	Rank
Renata Chrust	Standing 5 km Classic LW3/4/9	22:13.7	6
Renata Chrust	Standing 10 km Free LW3/4/9	0:43:35.3	6
Józef Gawlak-Homernik	Standing 10 km Classic LW6/8	29:36.2	5
Józef Gawlak-Homernik	Standing 20 km Free LW6/8	DNS	
Piotr Greczek	Standing 15 km Classic B3	50:01.9	9
Piotr Greczek	Standing 30 km Free B3	1:32:56.2	12
Jan Kołodziej	Standing 5 km Classic LW3/9	16:02.5	3rd place, bronze medalist(s)
Jan Kołodziej	Standing 10 km Free LW3/9	0:32:35.2	3rd place, bronze medalist(s)
Marcin Kos	Standing 5 km Classic LW5/7	17:19.2	2nd place, silver medalist(s)
Marcin Kos	Standing 15 km Free LW5/7	0:51:40.0	1st place, gold medalist(s)
Andrzej Pietrzyk	Standing 10 km Classic LW6/8	29:16.2	4
Andrzej Pietrzyk	Standing 20 km Free LW6/8	1:02:49.7	4
Beata Pomietło	Standing 5 km Classic LW3/4/9	24:31.3	7
Beata Pomietło	Standing 10 km Free LW3/4/9	0:46:56.6	7
Ryszard Przednówek	Standing 5 km Classic LW2	16:28.1	9
Ryszard Przednówek	Standing 10 km Free LW2	0:35:31.4	9
Stanisława Rola	Standing 5 km Classic B3	21:04.0	5
Stanisława Rola	Standing 10 km Free B3	0:39:03.0	5
Jerzy Szlezak	Standing 5 km Classic LW5/7	17:55.9	5
Jerzy Szlezak	Standing 15 km Free LW5/7	0:54:50.0	3rd place, bronze medalist(s)
Jerzy Slazyk	Standing 15 km Classic B2	50:20.7	8
Jerzy Slazyk	Standing 30 km Free B2	1:35:45.1	9
Kazimierz Wyszowski	Standing 5 km Classic LW3/9	16:04.4	4
Kazimierz Wyszowski	Standing 10 km Free LW3/9	0:34:13.2	4
Jan Kołodziej; Marian Damian; Andrzej Pietrzyk; Kazimierz Wyszowski	4 x 5 km Relay Standing LW2-9	1:11:29.9	6

== See also ==
- Poland at the Paralympics
- Poland at the 1988 Winter Olympics
