= Finland at the 1994 Winter Paralympics =

- IPC code: FIN
- NPC: Finnish Paralympic Committee
- Website: www.paralympia.fi/en

in Lillehammer
- Competitors: 18
- Medals Ranked 7th: Gold 7 Silver 6 Bronze 11 Total 24

Winter Paralympics appearances (overview)
- 1976; 1980; 1984; 1988; 1992; 1994; 1998; 2002; 2006; 2010; 2014; 2018; 2022; 2026

Finland competed at the 1994 Winter Paralympics in Lillehammer, Norway. 18 competitors from Finland won 24 medals including 7 gold, 6 silver and 11 bronze and finished 7th in the medal table.

== See also ==
- Finland at the Paralympics
- Finland at the 1994 Winter Olympics
