= Canada at the 1988 Winter Paralympics =

- Flag of Canada
- IPC code: CAN
- NPC: Canadian Paralympic Committee
- Website: www.paralympic.ca

in Innsbruck
- Competitors: 20 in 2 sports
- Medals Ranked 8th: Gold 5 Silver 3 Bronze 5 Total 13

Winter Paralympics appearances (overview)
- 1976; 1980; 1984; 1988; 1992; 1994; 1998; 2002; 2006; 2010; 2014; 2018; 2022; 2026

Canada competed at the 1988 Winter Paralympics in Innsbruck, Austria from January 17 to 25, 1988. Canada entered 20 athletes in two of the four disciplines at the Games; twelve in Alpine skiing and eight in Nordic skiing (cross-country skiing).

== Medallists ==
Medal	Name	Sport	Event
Gold	Lynda Chyzyk	Alpine skiing	Women's slalom LW2
Gold	Sandra Lecour	Cross-country skiing	Women's 5 km B2
Gold	Sandra Lecour	Cross-country skiing	Women's 10 km B2
Gold	Francine Lemire	Cross-country skiing	Women's 5 km LW3/4/9
Gold	Francine Lemire	Cross-country skiing	Women's 10 km LW3/4/9
Silver	Uli Rompel	Alpine skiing	Men's downhill B3
Silver	Uli Rompel	Alpine skiing	Men's giant slalom B3
Silver	Lana Spreeman	Alpine skiing	Women's slalom LW4
Bronze	Michel Duranceau	Alpine skiing	Men's slalom LW2
Bronze	Stephen Ellefson	Alpine skiing	Men's downhill LW1
Bronze	John Houston	Alpine skiing	Men's giant slalom B1
Bronze	Lana Spreeman	Alpine skiing	Women's downhill LW4
Bronze	Sandra Lecour; Tricia Lovegrove; Kim Umback	Cross-country skiing	Women's 3x5 km relay B1-3

== See also ==
- Canada at the 1988 Winter Olympics
- Canada at the Paralympics
