= Ice sledge speed racing at the 1988 Winter Paralympics =

Ice sledge speed racing at the 1988 Winter Paralympics consisted of twelve events, eight for men and four for women.

== Medal table ==
Rank	Nation	Gold	Silver	Bronze	Total
1	Norway	8	10	8	26
2	Austria	4	2	3	9
3	West Germany	0	0	1	1
Totals (3 entries)		12	12	12	36

== Medal summary ==
=== Men's events ===
Event	Gold	Silver	Bronze
100 m grade I	Felix Karl; Austria	Josef Greil; Austria	Hans J. Gruber; West Germany
100 m grade II	Knut Lundstrøm; Norway	Rolf Einar Pedersen; Norway	Erik Sandbraaten; Norway
300 m grade I	Felix Karl; Austria	Josef Greil; Austria	Terje Johansen; Norway
500 m grade I	Felix Karl; Austria	Terje Johansen; Norway	Josef Greil; Austria
500 m grade II	Knut Lundstrøm; Norway	Erik Sandbraaten; Norway	Rolf Einar Pedersen; Norway
700 m grade I	Felix Karl; Austria	Terje Johansen; Norway	Josef Greil; Austria
1000 m grade II	Knut Lundstrøm; Norway	Erik Sandbraaten; Norway	Rolf Einar Pedersen; Norway
1500 m grade II	Knut Lundstrøm; Norway	Erik Sandbraaten; Norway	Atle Haglund; Norway

=== Women's events ===
Event	Gold	Silver	Bronze
100 m grade II	Ragnhild Myklebust; Norway	Sylva Olsen; Norway	Kirsti Hoøen; Norway
500 m grade II	Sylva Olsen; Norway	Ragnhild Myklebust; Norway	Kirsti Hoøen; Norway
700 m grade II	Ragnhild Myklebust; Norway	Sylva Olsen; Norway	Kirsti Hoøen; Norway
1000 m grade II	Ragnhild Myklebust; Norway	Sylva Olsen; Norway	Kirsti Hoøen; Norway
