= Taiki Kawayoke =

Japanese paralympic cross country skier

Taiki Kawayoke 川除大輝
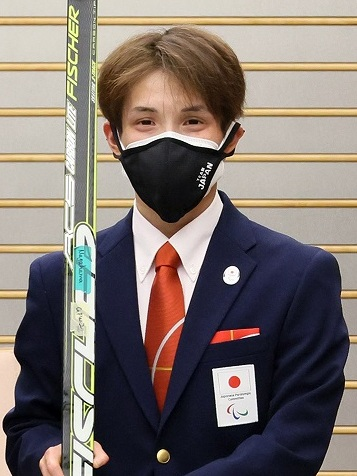

Personal information
- Nationality: Japanese
- Born: 21 February 2001 (age 25) Toyama Prefecture, Japan

Sport
- Country: Japan
- Disability class: LW5/7
Medal record
Men's Paralympic cross-country skiing
Representing Japan
Winter Paralympics
Gold medal – first place	2022 Beijing	20km classical standing

Taiki Kawayoke (Japanese: 川除 大輝, Hepburn: Kawayoke Taiki; born 21 February 2001) is a Japanese paralympic cross country skier. He participated at the 2022 Winter Paralympics in the 20 kilometre classical event and won the gold medal with a time of 52:52.8.
