= Francine Lemire =

Canadian cross-country skier

Francine Lemire CM
Personal information
- Born: August 11, 1952 Montreal, Quebec, Canada
- Died: October 11, 2026 (aged 74) Corner Brook, Newfoundland and Labrador, Canada

Sport
- Country: Canada
- Sport: Cross-country skiing

Francine Lise Lemire CM (August 14, 1952 – October 11, 2026) was a Canadian cross-country skier. She represented Canada at the 1984 Winter Paralympics and at the 1988 Winter Paralympics, both held in Innsbruck, Austria.

In total, she won two gold medals, both at the 1988 Winter Paralympics.

Lemire won the gold medals in the women's short distance 5 km LW3/4/9 and women's long distance 10 km LW3/4/9 events.

Lemire was born in 1952, at Montreal, Quebec. She had a tumour removed from her knee when she was three years old, affecting the growth of her legs. This later required several medical procedures, including an amputation, to maintain her mobility. After attending medical school at McGill University, she moved to Corner Brook, Newfoundland and Labrador, where she practiced emergency medicine.

She was appointed as a Member of the Order of Canada in 2023. Lemire died in Corner Brook on October 11, 2026, at the age of 74, from ovarian cancer.
