= Russia at the 2002 Winter Paralympics =

- IPC code: RUS
- NPC: Russian Paralympic Committee
- Website: www.paralymp.ru (in Russian)

in Salt Lake City
- Competitors: 26
- Medals Ranked 5th: Gold 7 Silver 9 Bronze 5 Total 21

Winter Paralympics appearances (overview)
- 1994; 1998; 2002; 2006; 2010; 2014; 2018–2022; 2026

Other related appearances
- Soviet Union (1988); Unified Team (1992); Neutral Paralympic Athletes (2018)

Russia competed at the 2002 Winter Paralympics in Salt Lake City, United States. 26 competitors from Russia won 21 medals including 7 gold, 9 silver and 5 bronze and finished 5th in the medal table.

== See also ==
- Russia at the Paralympics
- Russia at the 2002 Winter Olympics
