= Svein Lilleberg =

Norwegian cross-country skier (born 1958)

Personal information
- Born: 12 November 1958 (age 67) Gåslanddalen, Hølonda Municipality, Norway

Sport
- Sport: Para cross-country skiing
Medal record
Representing Norway
Paralympic Games
Gold medal – first place	1984 Innsbruck	10km LW4
Gold medal – first place	1988 Innsbruck	7.5km LW4
Gold medal – first place	1988 Innsbruck	4.5km relay LW2-9
Gold medal – first place	1992 Albertville	4x5km relay LW2-9
Gold medal – first place	1994 Lillehammer	4x5km relay
Silver medal – second place	1984 Innsbruck	5km LW4
Silver medal – second place	1988 Innsbruck	5km LW4
Silver medal – second place	1988 Innsbruck	15km LW4
Silver medal – second place	1992 Albertville	5km LW2, 4
Silver medal – second place	1994 Lillehammer	5km LW4
Silver medal – second place	1994 Lillehammer	10km LW2/3/9
Silver medal – second place	1994 Lillehammer	20km LW4
Bronze medal – third place	1994 Lillehammer	7.5km LW2/3/9

Svein Lilleberg (born 12 November 1958) is a Norwegian cross-country skier.

He contracted polio early, when he was only six months old. To begin with, he was totally paralysed, later regaining most movement, but he has never had use of one foot. He competes in the LW2.

Svein has three sisters, and is married and has four children. They live in Heimdal in Trondheim Municipality, near his training base in Granåsen. He was born in Gåslanddalen in Hølonda Municipality (now part of Melhus Municipality) and is a member of Leik IL.

== Results ==
- 2006 Winter Paralympics
  - 19th - 5 km
  - 6th - 20 km
  - 5th - 10 km
- 1998 Winter Paralympics
  - 8th - 15 km
  - 13th - 20 km
  - 12th - 10 km
- 1994 Winter Paralympics
  - Silver - 10 km
  - Silver - 20 km
  - Silver - 5 km
  - Gold - relay
  - Bronze - biathlon
- 1992 Winter Paralympics
  - Gold - relay
  - Silver - 5 km
  - 6th - 20 km
- 1988 Winter Paralympics
- Gold- relay
  - Gold - 7.5 km
  - Silver - 15 km
  - Silver - 5 km
- 1984 Winter Paralympics
  - Gold - 10 km
  - Silver - 5 km
- 1982 World Championships (Switzerland)
  - Gold - 5 km and 10 km
