= Yoshihiro Nitta (philosopher) =

Japanese university professor and philosopher (1929–2020)

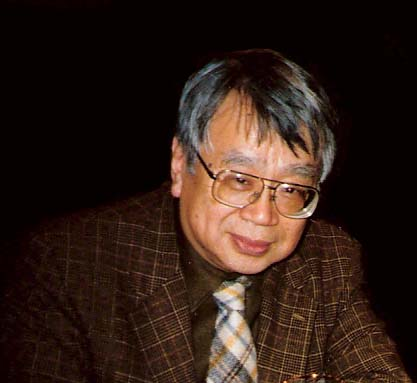
- Born: 21 January 1929; Ishikawa Prefecture, Japan
- Died: 15 March 2020 (aged 91)
- Education: Tohoku University
- Occupations: University professor, philosopher

Yoshihiro Nitta (にった よしひろ, Yoshihiro Nitta; legal name 新田義弘; 21 January 1929 – 15 March 2020) was a Japanese university professor and philosopher. He is reputed as one of the greatest people to have influenced the Japanese philosophy.

== Life and career ==
Nitta studied from 1949 to 1957 at the Tohoku University in the field of philosophy. He also received a scholarship from the Alexander von Humboldt Foundation to study at the University of Cologne.

Between 1970 and until his retirement in 1999, he taught philosophy as a full professor at the Toyo University.

Nitta died on 15 March 2020, at the age of 91.

== Footnotes ==
- ISBN 3-495-47725-X
- ISBN 978-3-8260-3895-2
- ISBN 3-8260-3216-0
