= Erik Sandbraathen =

Norwegian Paralympic athlete (born 1951)

Personal information
- Nationality: Norway
- Born: 9 January 1951 (age 75) Oslo, Norway
Medal record
Paralympic Games
Men's ice sledge racing
| Gold medal – first place | 1980 Geilo | 100m |
| Gold medal – first place | 1980 Geilo | 500m |
| Gold medal – first place | 1984 Innsbruck | 100m |
| Silver medal – second place | 1984 Innsbruck | 500m |
| Bronze medal – third place | 1984 Innsbruck | 1000m |
| Silver medal – second place | 1988 Innsbruck | 100m |
| Silver medal – second place | 1988 Innsbruck | 500m |
| Silver medal – second place | 1988 Innsbruck | 1000m |
Cross-country skiing
| Gold medal – first place | 1988 Innsbruck | Relay |
| Silver medal – second place | 1988 Innsbruck | 5km |
| Bronze medal – third place | 1988 Innsbruck | 10km |
Men's ice sledge hockey
| Silver medal – second place | 1994 Lillehammer |
| Gold medal – first place | 1998 Nagano |
| Silver medal – second place | 2002 Salt Lake City |

Erik Sandbraathen (born 9 January 1951) is a former Norwegian Paralympic ice sledge racer, cross-country skier, and ice sledge hockey player. He won medals for Norway at the 1984 Winter Paralympics, 1988 Winter Paralympics, 1994 Winter Paralympics, 1998 Winter Paralympics, 2002 Winter Paralympics.
