= Wolfgang Pickl =

Austrian Paralympic athlete

Sport
- Country: Austria
Medal record
Paralympic Games
Bronze medal – third place	1976 Örnsköldsvik	3x10 km Relay III-IV B
Bronze medal – third place	1980 Arnhem	100 m E
Bronze medal – third place	1980 Arnhem	Pentathlon E
Silver medal – second place	1988 Innsbruck	7.5 km LW6/8

Wolfgang Pickl is an Austrian Paralympic athlete. He represented Austria at seven editions of the Paralympics: the 1980 Summer Paralympics and the Winter Paralympics of 1976, 1980, 1984, 1988, 1992 and 1994.

He competed in alpine skiing, cross-country skiing, biathlon and track and field events.

In total, he won one silver medal and three bronze medals at the Paralympics.
