= Valentina Grigoryeva =

Soviet cross-country skier

Medal record

Representing Soviet Union

Cross-country skiing (B1)

Paralympic Games
Bronze medal – third place	1988 Innsbruck	5km
Bronze medal – third place	1988 Innsbruck	10km

Valentina Vladimirovna Grigoryeva (Russian: Валенти́на Влади́мировна Григо́рьева, born in Berdinki, Smolensk Oblast) is a former Soviet cross-country skier.

Grigoryeva represented the Soviet Union at the 1988 Winter Paralympics in Innsbruck, and won two bronze medals, in the five kilometre and ten kilometre events. She was the only Soviet athlete to win a medal at the Innsbruck Games, and, since this was the USSR's first and last appearance at the Winter Paralympics, she is the only Soviet athlete to win a Winter Paralympic medal.

Grigoryeva did not compete again at the Paralympic Games.
