= Theo Bold =

German Para Nordic skier (born 2006)

Personal information
- Born: 11 March 2006 (age 20) Velbert, Germany

Sport
- Country: Germany
- Sport: Para Nordic skiing (Para cross-country skiing and Para biathlon)
- Disability: Visually impaired
- Disability class: NS3
Medal record
Men's Para cross-country skiing
Representing Germany
Paralympic Games
| Silver medal – second place | 2026 Milano Cortina | 4 × 2.5 km relay open |

Theo Bold (born 11 March 2006) is a German visually impaired Para cross-country skier and biathlete. He represented Germany at the 2026 Winter Paralympics.

== Early life ==
Bold was born in Velbert, Germany. Because of a congenital eye condition he has only about ten percent vision, placing him in the vision-impaired classification for para Nordic skiing competitions.

== Career ==
He competes together with his guide, usually his older brother Jakob Bold, who communicates course conditions and directions during races. The close cooperation between the brothers allows Bold to compete at high speed despite his limited eyesight.

Bold first became involved in cross-country skiing after family ski holidays and encouragement from coaches who recognized his athletic potential. His brother later joined him as guide, and the two began competing together in national competitions.

In December 2024, the Bold brothers made their debut in the FIS Para Cross-Country World Cup. They achieved strong early results, including sixth-place finishes in sprint races and a seventh place in the para sprint at the Nordic Ski World Championships in Trondheim.

Bold made his Paralympic debut at the 2026 Winter Paralympics in Milan and Cortina d'Ampezzo, competing in both Para cross-country skiing and Para biathlon events.

== Results ==
=== Paralympic Games ===
| Year | Venue | Sport | Results |
|---|---|---|---|
| 2026 | Italy Milan/Cortina d'Ampezzo | Para biathlon | 11th Sprint vision impaired |
| 2026 | Italy Milan/Cortina d'Ampezzo | Para cross-country skiing | 5th Sprint classic VI; 8th 10 km interval start classic VI |

=== World Championships ===
| Year | Venue | Sport | Results |
|---|---|---|---|
| 2025 | Norway Trondheim | Para cross-country skiing | 7th Sprint VI classic |
| 2025 | Italy Toblach | Para cross-country skiing | 9th 10 km interval start VI classic 10th 20 km interval start VI free |
