= Tricia Lovegrove =

Canadian cross-country skier

Sport
- Country: Canada
- Sport: Cross-country skiing

Tricia Lovegrove is a Canadian cross-country skier. She represented Canada at the 1988 Winter Paralympics, at the 1992 Winter Paralympics and at the 1994 Winter Paralympics.

She won the bronze medal together with Kim Umback and Sandra Lecour in the women's 3x5 km relay B1-3 event.
