= Finland at the 2002 Winter Paralympics =

- IPC code: FIN
- NPC: Finnish Paralympic Committee
- Website: www.paralympia.fi/en

in Salt Lake City
- Competitors: 14
- Medals Ranked 9th: Gold 4 Silver 1 Bronze 3 Total 8

Winter Paralympics appearances (overview)
- 1976; 1980; 1984; 1988; 1992; 1994; 1998; 2002; 2006; 2010; 2014; 2018; 2022; 2026

Finland competed at the 2002 Winter Paralympics in Salt Lake City, United States. 14 competitors from Finland won 8 medals, including 4 gold, 1 silver and 3 bronze and finished 9th in the medal table.

== See also ==
- Finland at the Paralympics
- Finland at the 2002 Winter Olympics
