= Kim Umback =

Canadian cross-country skier

Sport
- Country: Canada
- Sport: Cross-country skiing
Medal record
Paralympic Games
Bronze medal – third place	1988 Innsbruck	3x5 km relay B1-3

Kim Umback is a Canadian cross-country skier. She represented Canada at the 1988 Winter Paralympics and she competed in three events in cross-country skiing.

She won the bronze medal in the women's 3x5 km relay B1-3 event together with Sandra Lecour and Tricia Lovegrove.

She also competed in the women's short distance 5 km B2 and women's long distance 10 km B2 events.

She was diagnosed with Leber's congenital amaurosis.
