= Jouko Grip =

Finnish Paralympic athlete (born 1949)

Personal information
- Born: 10 January 1949 (age 77) Pälkäne, Finland

Sport
- Country: Finland
- Sport: Track and field, Cross-country skiing, Biathlon
- Disability: Polio

Achievements and titles
- Paralympic finals: 1980–2002 (Winter), 1984–1988 (Summer)
Medal record
Men's track and field, Cross-country skiing, Biathlon
Representing Finland
Paralympic Games
Gold medal – first place	1980 Geilo	Cross-country skiing
Gold medal – first place	1984 Innsbruck	Cross-country skiing
Gold medal – first place	1984 New York/Stoke Mandeville	400 m, 1500 m
Gold medal – first place	1988 Innsbruck	Cross-country skiing, Biathlon
Gold medal – first place	1992 Tignes-Albertville	Cross-country skiing, Biathlon
Gold medal – first place	1994 Lillehammer	Cross-country skiing
Silver medal – second place	1984 Innsbruck	Cross-country skiing
Silver medal – second place	1988 Innsbruck	Cross-country skiing
Silver medal – second place	1992 Tignes-Albertville	Cross-country skiing
Silver medal – second place	1994 Lillehammer	Cross-country skiing

Jouko Grip (born 10 January 1949 in Pälkäne) is a Paralympic athlete who has won medals in both the Summer and Winter Games. Most of his medals were in Nordic skiing. He is Finnish and has polio in his left hand. In 2006 he was inducted into the Paralympic Hall of Fame. He competed at the Summer Paralympics twice, in 1984 and 1988, and participated in track and field athletics both times, winning two gold medals in the 400 and 1500 metre races in 1984. He competed in seven consecutive Winter Paralympics, from 1980 to 2002, and won a total of ten gold and five silver medals. Two of his winter gold medals were won in the biathlon and the remainder of his winter medals were from cross-country skiing.
