= Tanja Kari =

Finnish cross-country skier

Tanja Kari (née Tervonen; born 30 August 1971) is a Finnish Paralympic gold medalist in cross-country skiing. She was born in Ii with a withered right hand due to a congenital condition. In 2003, she was nominated for the Laureus World Sports Award for Sportsperson of the Year with a Disability and in 2010 she was inducted into the Paralympic Hall of Fame. She was voted Finland's best disabled athlete in 1998 and 2002. In the 2000s, Kari was a member of the WADA Athletes' Committee and the Athletes' Committee of the International Paralympic Committee.
