= Inkki Inola =

Finnish Para cross-country skier (born 1999)

Personal information
- Nationality: Finnish
- Born: 26 January 1999 (age 27)

Sport
- Country: Finland
- Sport: Para cross-country skiing
- Disability: Visually impaired
- Disability class: NS3
Medal record
Men's Para cross-country skiing
Representing Finland
Winter Paralympics
Silver medal – second place	2026 Milano Cortina	10 km classical
World Championships
Bronze medal – third place	2025 Trondheim	1 km sprint
World University Games
Gold medal – first place	2025 Turin	Sprint classical
Gold medal – first place	2025 Turin	10 km freestyle

Inkki Inola (born 26 January 1999) is a visually impaired Finnish Para cross-country skier.

== Career ==
Inola represented Finland at the 2018 Winter Paralympics. He again competed at the 2022 Winter Paralympics, with his best result being fourth place in the 20 kilometre classical event.

In January 2025, Inola competed at the 2025 Winter World University Games in Para cross-country skiing and won gold medals in the sprint classical and the 10 kilometre freestyle events. In March 2025, he competed at the FIS Nordic World Ski Championships 2025 and won bronze medal in the 1 kilometre sprint event with a time of 3:37.10. This marked the first time that para cross-country athletes raced in the same stadium and on the same day as their able-bodied counterparts.

He was one of the first Finnish athletes selected to represent Finland at the 2026 Winter Paralympics, along with Nette Kiviranta.
