= Terje Johansen =

Norwegian politician (born 1941)

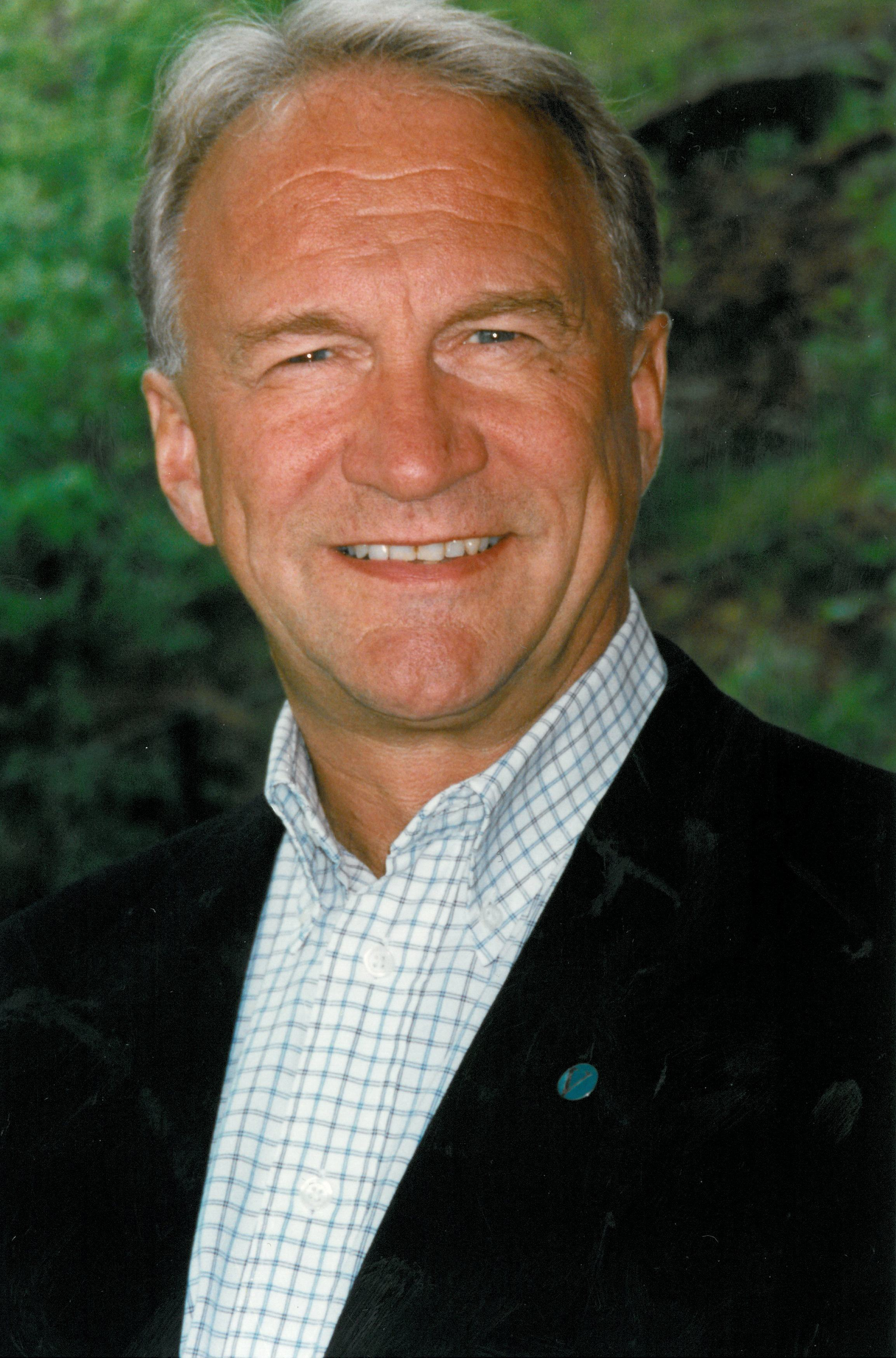
- Born: 31 August 1941 (age 84); Trondheim, Norway
- Occupation: Politician

Terje Johansen (born 31 August 1941) is a Norwegian politician.

== Biography ==
Johansen was born in Trondheim to Johan L. Johansen and Åse Berg. He was elected representative to the Storting for the period 1997–2001 for the Liberal Party from the constituency of Akershus.
