= Soviet Union at the 1988 Winter Paralympics =

Soviet Union at the 1988 Summer Paralympics
- Flag of the Soviet Union
- IPC code: URS

in Seoul
- Competitors: 8 in 1 sport
- Medals: Gold 0 Silver 0 Bronze 2 Total 2

Summer Paralympics appearances (overview)
- 1988

Other related appearances
- Unified Team (1992); Estonia (1992–pres.); Latvia (1992–pres.); Lithuania (1992–pres.); Belarus (1994–pres.); Kazakhstan (1994–pres.); Russia (1994–2014); Armenia (1996–pres.); Azerbaijan (1996–pres.); Kyrgyzstan (1996–pres.); Moldova (1996–pres.); Ukraine (1996–pres.); Turkmenistan (2000–pres.); Tajikistan (2004–pres.); Uzbekistan (2004–pres.); Georgia (2008–pres.); RPC (2020)

The Union of Soviet Socialist Republics made its Winter Paralympic début at the 1988 Winter Paralympics in Innsbruck, Austria. This was also the last appearance of the Soviet Union in the Winter Paralympics before the union's dissolution. The country was represented by eight athletes, who all completed in cross-country skiing. Valentina Grigoryeva won the USSR's only medals: two bronze.

== Medallists ==
=== Bronze ===
- Valentina Grigoryeva - cross-country skiing, women's 10km B1
- Valentina Grigoryeva - cross-country skiing, women's 5km B1

== See also ==
- 1988 Winter Paralympics
- Soviet Union at the Paralympics
- Soviet Union at the 1988 Winter Olympics
