= Yoshihiro Nitta (skier) =

Japanese Paralympic cross-country skier and biathlete

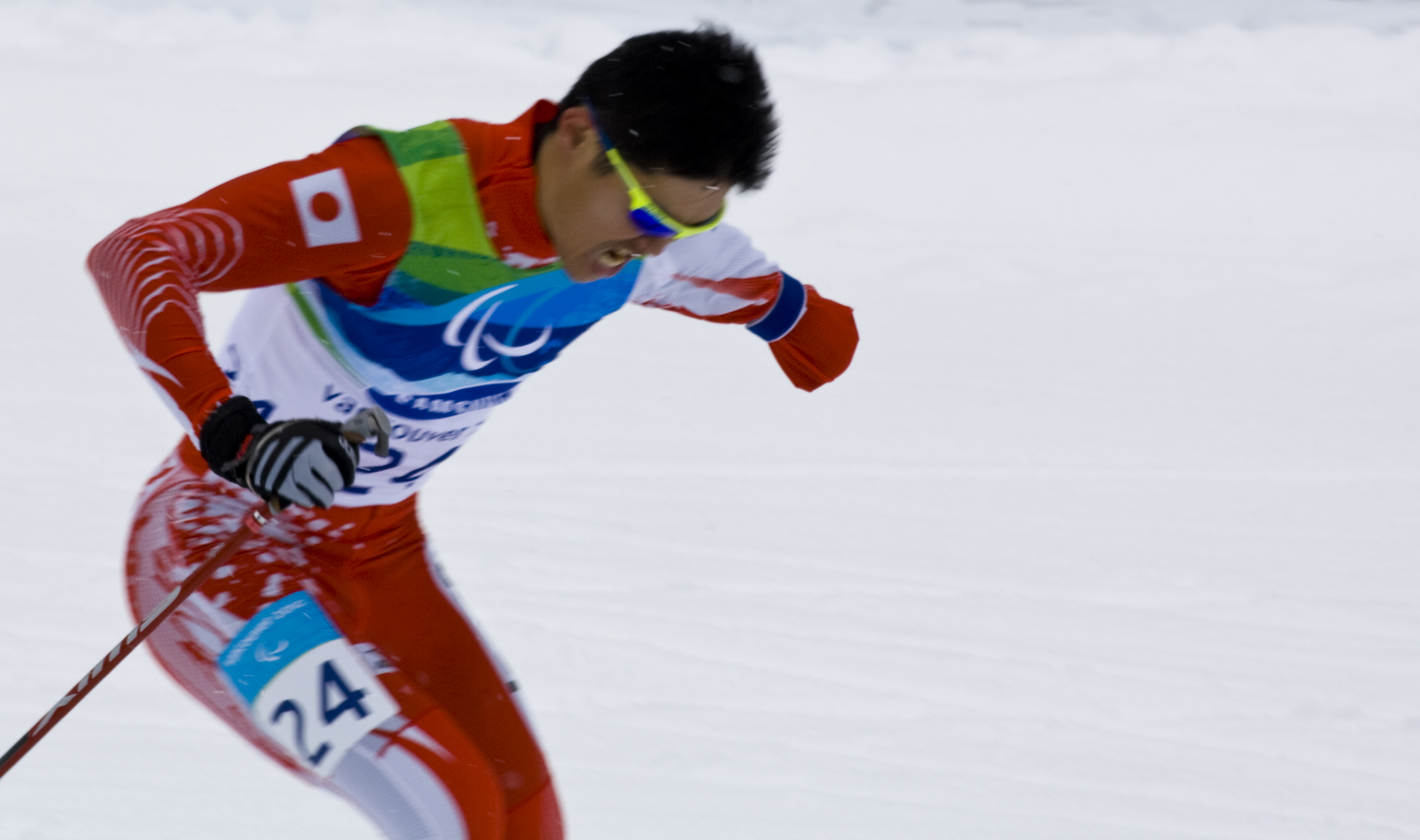
- Yoshihiro Nitta at the 2010 Winter Paralympics

Personal information
- Nationality: Japanese
- Born: June 8, 1980 (age 46) Nishiawakura, Okayama Prefecture, Japan
- Height: 1.77 m (5 ft 10 in)
- Weight: 66 kg (146 lb)
- Website: www.nitta-yoshihiro.com

Sport
- Country: Japan
- Sport: Cross-country skiing and Biathlon
- Disability class: LW6/8
- Coached by: Hideki Arai
Medal record
Men's cross-country skiing
Representing Japan
Paralympic Games
Gold medal – first place	2010 Vancouver	1km sprint classic - standing
Gold medal – first place	2010 Vancouver	10km classic style - standing
Gold medal – first place	2018 Pyeongchang	10km classic - standing
Silver medal – second place	2018 Pyeongchang	1.5km sprint classic - standing
Bronze medal – third place	2002 Salt Lake	5km classic style - LW5-9

Yoshihiro Nitta (新田佳浩, Nitta Yoshihiro; born 8 July 1980) is a Japanese Paralympic cross-country skier and biathlete. He is regarded as one of the most experienced Japanese Paralympic competitors as he went onto represent Japan at the Paralympics in 1998, 2002, 2006, 2010, 2014, 2018 and 2022. Yoshihiro Nitta has won 4 medals in his Paralympic career, including 2 gold medals at the 2010 Winter Paralympics. He achieved his 4th Paralympic medal in his career and the first medal since the 2010 Winter Paralympics after claiming a silver medal in the men's 1.5km sprint classic standing cross-country skiing event during the 2018 Winter Paralympics.

== Biography ==
As a child, his left arm was amputated at the age of 3 below the elbow after his left arm was caught in a combine harvester which was driven by his grandfather. He took the sport of skiing at the age of nine, in the third grade of his elementary school. He graduated from the University of Tsukuba.

== Career ==
Yoshihiro Nitta made his Paralympic debut for Japan during the 1998 Winter Paralympics but went medalless in his first Paralympic event. He clinched his first Paralympic medal, a bronze medal, in the men's 5km classic style event as a part of the 2002 Winter Paralympics. Yoshihiro made his reputation at the 2010 Winter Paralympics, claiming 2 gold medals in the 1km sprint classic standing and 10km classic style events.

Yoshihiro Nitta also competed in the 2018 Winter Paralympics representing Japan, making it his 6th consecutive Winter Paralympic event since making his debut in 1998. He claimed his first Paralympic gold medal in 8 years by securing gold in the men's cross-country 10km classical skiing event during the 2018 Winter Paralympics taking 24 minutes and 6.8 seconds.

He underwent a rehab after spraining his left ankle which he endured during a training session in August 2021. He insisted that he was inspired to train hard and prepare himself for 2022 Winter Paralympics after watching the passion of athletes through television who took part in 2020 Summer Paralympics amid the COVID-19 triggered bogged buildup for the competition. He represented Japan at the 2022 Winter Paralympics, his 7th consecutive Winter Paralympic event, at the age of 41. He would continue to compete in the 2026 Winter Paralympics.
