= Lorna Manzer =

Canadian Paralympic skier

Personal information
- Born: 1952 or 1953 (age 73–74)

Sport
- Country: Canada
- Sport: Para-alpine skiing
Medal record
Paralympic Games

Lorna Manzer (born 1952 or 1953) is a Canadian Paralympic skier. Over the course of two Paralympic Games, she earned two bronze medals, two gold medals, and one silver for Team Canada.

== Career ==
While majoring in physical education at Mount Royal College in the 1970s, Manzer lost part of her right leg when she was run over by a car on the Trans-Canada Highway. During her recovery, she came in contact with Jerry Johnston and Sunshine Village who worked with amputees in cross-country skiing. With practice, Manzer and Brent Munro became the first Canadians to participate in Cross-country skiing at the 1976 Winter Paralympics. She earned a gold medal at the 5 km short distance Class II race, although she was the only competitor. Manzer also finished in third place in the Women's Slalom II and Giant Slalom II. In the following Paralympic Winter Games, Manzer earned a gold medal in the Women's Slalom 2A and a silver medal in Women's Giant Slalom 2A. She earned a certified skiing instructors certificate from the Canadian Ski instructors Alliance and won three medals at the 1982 Winter World Championships for the Disabled. She received a bronze medal in alpine skiing, another bronze in giant slalom, and a silver medal in downhill.
