= Norway at the 2002 Winter Paralympics =

- IPC code: NOR
- NPC: Norwegian Olympic and Paralympic Committee and Confederation of Sports
- Website: www.idrett.no (in Norwegian)

in Salt Lake City
- Competitors: 27
- Medals Ranked 3rd: Gold 10 Silver 3 Bronze 6 Total 19

Winter Paralympics appearances (overview)
- 1976; 1980; 1984; 1988; 1992; 1994; 1998; 2002; 2006; 2010; 2014; 2018; 2022; 2026

Norway competed at the 2002 Winter Paralympics in Salt Lake City, United States. 27 competitors from Norway won 19 medals, including 10 gold, 3 silver and 6 bronze and finished 3rd in the medal table.

== See also ==
- Norway at the Paralympics
- Norway at the 2002 Winter Olympics
