= Finland at the 1988 Winter Paralympics =

- Flag of Finland
- IPC code: FIN
- NPC: Finnish Paralympic Committee
- Website: www.paralympia.fi
- Medals Ranked 4th: Gold 9 Silver 8 Bronze 8 Total 25

Winter Paralympics appearances (overview)
- 1976; 1980; 1984; 1988; 1992; 1994; 1998; 2002; 2006; 2010; 2014; 2018; 2022; 2026

Finland competed at the 1988 Winter Paralympics in Innsbruck, Austria, winning nine gold, eight silver and eight bronze medals, finishing 4th in the medal table.

In total three medals were won by Finnish competitors:

- Jouko Grip won the gold medal in the Men's 7.5 km LW6/8 event
- Kalervo Pieksaemaeki won the silver medal in the Men's 7.5 km LW4 event
- Pertti Sankilampi won the bronze medal in the Men's 7.5 km LW2 event

== Cross-country skiing ==
The majority of the country's medals at the games (22 out of 25) were won in cross-country skiing.

== See also ==
- Finland at the Paralympics
- Finland at the 1988 Summer Paralympics
