= Norway at the 1988 Winter Paralympics =

- Flag of Norway
- IPC code: NOR
- NPC: Norwegian Olympic and Paralympic Committee and Confederation of Sports
- Medals Ranked 1st: Gold 25 Silver 21 Bronze 14 Total 60

Winter Paralympics appearances (overview)
- 1976; 1980; 1984; 1988; 1992; 1994; 1998; 2002; 2006; 2010; 2014; 2018; 2022; 2026

Norway competed at the 1988 Winter Paralympics held in Innsbruck, Austria. In total athletes representing Norway won 25 gold medals, 21 silver medals and 14 bronze medals and the country finished in 1st place in the medal table.

== Alpine skiing ==
- Cato Zahl Pedersen won the gold medal in the Men's Downhill LW5/7 event
- Cato Zahl Pedersen won the gold medal in the Men's Giant Slalom LW5/7 event

== Biathlon ==
- Svein Lilleberg won the gold medal in the Men's 7.5 km LW4 event
- Svein Tore Fauskrud won the bronze medal in the Men's 7.5 km LW4 event

== Cross-country skiing ==
In total 29 medals were won in cross-country skiing.

== Ice sledge speed racing ==
In total 27 medals were won in ice sledge speed racing.

== See also ==
- Norway at the Paralympics
- Norway at the 1988 Summer Paralympics
