= 1988 Winter Paralympics =

Multi-parasport event in Innsbruck, Austria

IV Paralympic Winter Games
- Location: Innsbruck, Austria
- Nations: 22
- Athletes: 377
- Events: 96 in 4 sports
- Opening: 17 January 1988
- Closing: 24 January 1988
- Opened by: President Kurt Waldheim
- Stadium: Olympiahalle

The 1988 Winter Paralympic Games (German: Paralympische Winterspiele 1988) were the fourth Winter Paralympics, held again in Innsbruck, Austria. These were the last Paralympics to be held in a separate location from the Olympics. Beginning in 1992, the Olympics and the Paralympics were held in the same city or in an adjacent city. These Paralympics were not held at the same Olympic venue in Calgary, Canada, because of financial and recruiting difficulties. A total of 377 athletes from 22 countries took part. The USSR competed for the first and only time. Sit-skiing was introduced as another event in both the Alpine and Nordic skiing competitions. Other sports were biathlon and ice sledge speed racing. Ice sledge speed racer Knut Lundstroem from Norway was the most successful athlete, winning four gold medals in the 100m, 500m, 1000m and 1500m events.

== Sports ==
- Alpine skiing
- Ice sledge speed racing
- Nordic skiing
  - Biathlon
  - Cross-country skiing

== Medal table ==
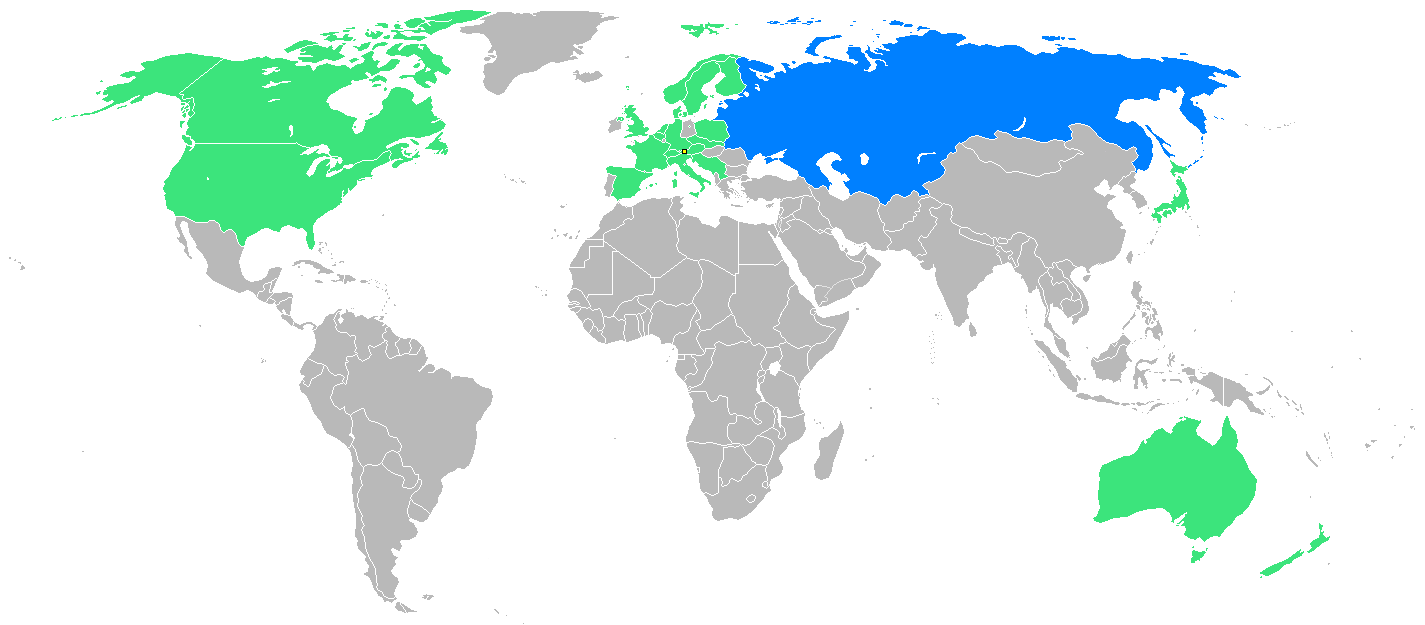
Participating countries; first time participants are blue.

The top 10 NPCs by number of gold medals are listed below. The host nation (Austria) is highlighted.

Rank	Nation	Gold	Silver	Bronze	Total
1	Norway	25	21	14	60
2	Austria*	20	10	14	44
3	West Germany	9	11	10	30
4	Finland	9	8	8	25
5	Switzerland	8	7	8	23
6	United States	7	17	6	30
7	France	5	5	3	13
8	Canada	5	3	5	13
9	Sweden	3	7	5	15
10	Italy	3	0	6	9
Totals (10 entries)		94	89	79	262

== Participating nations ==
Twenty two nations participated in the 1988 Winter Paralympics. Soviet Union made their debut appearance at the Winter Games.

- Australia (5)
- Austria (52) (Host nation)
- Belgium (2)
- Canada (20)
- Czechoslovakia (4)
- Denmark (3)
- Finland (21)
- France (16)
- Great Britain (21)
- Italy (24)
- Japan (13)
- Netherlands (8)
- New Zealand (3)
- Norway (21)
- Poland (18)
- Spain (7)
- Sweden (17)
- Switzerland (32)
- United States (45)
- Soviet Union (8)
- West Germany (34)
- Yugoslavia (3)

== See also ==
- 1988 Winter Olympics
- 1988 Summer Paralympics

Preceded by Innsbruck	Winter Paralympics; Innsbruck; V Paralympic Winter Games (1988)	Succeeded by Tignes–Albertville
