= Lists of Paralympic medalists =

This article includes lists of all Paralympic medalists since 1960, organized by each Paralympic sport or discipline, and also by Paralympiad.

== By sport ==
=== Summer Paralympic sports ===
Discipline	Contested	Number of		Medals awarded				Athlete(s) with the most medals (Gold-Silver-Bronze)
Discipline	Contested	Paralympiads	medal events in 2016	Gold	Silver	Bronze	Total	Athlete(s) with the most medals (Gold-Silver-Bronze)
Archery	Since 1960	15	9	152	143	133	428	Paola Fantato (ITA) (5–1–2)
Athletics	Since 1960	15	160	2848	2791	2708	8348	Zipora Rubin (ISR) (13–5–5); Heinz Frei (SUI) (11-6–5)
Boccia	Since 1984	9	7	63	63	63	189	Antonio Cid (ESP) (3–2–1); Antonio Marques (POR) (2–3–1); Henrik Jorgensen (DEN) (1–3–2); Fernando Ferreira (POR) (1–2–3)
Cycling	Since 1984	9	44	248	248	247	743	Christopher Scott (AUS) (6–2–2)
Equestrian	1984, since 1996	7	11	72	72	70	214	Lee Pearson (GBR) (9–0–0)
Football 5-a-side	Since 2004	4	4	4	4	4	9	Brazil (BRA) (3–0–0)
Goalball	Since 1976	12	20	20	20	20	60	Niklas Hultqvist (SWE) (0–1–2)
Judo	Since 1988	8	13	78	78	157	313	Satoshi Fujimoto (JPN) (3–1–0); Simon Jackson (GBR) (3–0–1); Yu Sung An (KOR) (2–0–2)
Paracanoe	Since 2016	1	6	6	6	6	18	
Paratriathlon	Since 2016	1	6	6	6	6	18	
Powerlifting	Since 1984	9	20	136	136	131	403	Fatma Omar (EGY) (4–0–0)
Rowing	Since 2008	3	12	12	12	12	36	Pam Relph (GBR) (2–0–0)
Shooting	Since 1976	11	11	158	152	153	463	Jonas Jacobsson (SWE) (16–1–8)
Swimming	Since 1960	15	147	2299	2204	2129	6632	Trischa Zorn (USA) (32–9–5)
Table tennis	Since 1960	15	29	396	393	476	1265	Zhang Xiaoling (CHN) (9–1–2); Jochen Wollmert (GER) (5–1–2)
Volleyball	Since 1976	11	2	14	14	14	42	Isa Zirahi (IRI) (5-2–0)
Wheelchair basketball	Since 1960	15	2	30	30	30	90	Tracey Ferguson (CAN) (3–0–1); Patrick Anderson (CAN) (3–1–0)
Wheelchair fencing	Since 1960	15	12	181	180	171	532	Roberto Marson (ITA) (8–5–2)
Wheelchair rugby	1996; since 2000	5	5	5	5	5	15	Nazim Erdem (AUS) (2–2–0)
Wheelchair tennis	1988; since 1992	8	48	38	38	38	114	Esther Vergeer (NED) (5–1–0); David Hall (AUS) (1–3–2)

=== Winter Paralympic sports ===
Discipline	Contested	Number of		Medals awarded				Athlete(s) with the most medals (Gold-Silver-Bronze)
Discipline	Contested	Paralympiads	medal events in 2018	Gold	Silver	Bronze	Total	Athlete(s) with the most medals (Gold-Silver-Bronze)
Alpine skiing	Since 1976	12	30	423	415	405	1243	Gerd Schönfelder (GER) (16–4–2)
Biathlon	Since 1988	9	18	56	56	57	286	Verena Bentele (GER) (3–0–1); Frank Höfle (GER) (3–0–1); Wilhelm Brem (GER) (2–1–1); Anne Floriet (FRA) (1–2–1)
Cross-country skiing	Since 1976	12	20	351	341	343	1035	Frank Höfle (GER)/(FRG) (10–5–2)
Ice sledge hockey	Since 1994	7	1	7	7	7	21	Helge Bjørnstad (NOR) (1–3–0); Eskil Hagen (NOR) (1–3–0); Atle Haglund (NOR) (1–3–0); Kjetil Korbu Nilsen (NOR) (1–3–0)
Snowboarding	Since 2014	2	10	12	12	12	36	Bibian Mentel-Spee (NED) (3–0–0)
Wheelchair curling	Since 2006	4	1	2	2	2	6	Sonja Gaudet (CAN) (3–0–0); Jalle Jungnell (SWE) (0–0–2)

=== Past sports ===
==== Summer ====
Discipline	Contested	Number of Paralympiads	Medals awarded				Athlete(s) with the most medals
Discipline	Contested	Number of Paralympiads	Gold	Silver	Bronze	Total	Athlete(s) with the most medals
Dartchery	1960–1980	6	12	12	12	36	Gwen Buck (GBR) (3–0–2); Eric Magennis (AUS) (3–0–0)
Football 7-a-side	1984–2016	9	9	9	9	27	Netherlands (NED) (3–0–0); Russia (RUS) (2–2–1)
Lawn bowls	1968–1988, 1996	7	68	60	59	187	Margaret Harriman (RHO) (3–1–1); Roy Fowler (AUS) (3–0–0)
Sailing	1996; 2000–2016	6	18	18	18	54	Paul Tingley (CAN) (1–0–2)
Snooker	1960–1988	8	10	10	10	30	Michael Shelton (GBR) (3–1–1)
Weightlifting	1964–1992	8	57	56	53	166	Abraham Strauch (ISR) (4–1–0); Vic Renalson (AUS) (3–1–0)
Wrestling	1980 & 1984	2	18	11	1	30	James Mastro (USA) (2–0–0); Ken Sparks (USA) (2–0–0)

==== Winter ====
Discipline	Contested	Number of Paralympiads	Medals awarded				Athlete(s) with the most medals
Discipline	Contested	Number of Paralympiads	Gold	Silver	Bronze	Total	Athlete(s) with the most medals
Ice sledge speed racing	1980–1988, 1994 & 1998	5	66	65	65	196	Knut Lundstrøm (NOR) (8–3–1)

== By Paralympiad ==
=== Summer Paralympic Games ===
Games	Medal		Host	Number of medal events	Medals awarded				Athlete(s) with the most medals (Gold-Silver-Bronze)
Games	Medal		Host	Number of medal events	Gold	Silver	Bronze	Total	Athlete(s) with the most medals (Gold-Silver-Bronze)
1960	winners	table	Rome, Italy	113	113	94	84	291	Maria Scutti (ITA) (9–1–2) Athletics
1964	winners	table	Tokyo, Japan	144	144	138	136	418	Dean Slaugh (USA) (4–0–0) Archery; Serge Bec (FRA) (3–1–0) Wheelchair Fencing; Roberto Marson (ITA) (1–2–1) Wheelchair Fencing
1968	winners	table	Tel Aviv, Israel	189	189	186	201	576	Roberto Marson (ITA) (4–2–0) Wheelchair Fencing
1972	winners	table	Heidelberg, West Germany	188	188	187	200	575	Eve M. Rimmer (NZL) (2–2–0) Athletics
1976	winners	table	Toronto, Ontario, Canada	447	447	378	347	1172	Josefina Cornejo (MEX) (4–1–0) Athletics; Uri Bergman (ISR) (6–0–0) Swimming; Marijke Ruiter (NED) (7–0–0) Swimming
1980	winners	table	Arnhem, Netherlands	587	587	537	486	1610	Trischa Zorn (USA) (5–0–0) Swimming
1984	winners	table	Stoke Mandeville, United Kingdom; New York, United States	973	973	946	848	2767	Monica Saker (SWE) (5–0–0) Athletics; Helena Brunner (AUS) (5–1–1) Swimming
1988	winners	table	Seoul, South Korea	733	733	731	744	2208	Mike Kenny (GBR) (5–1–0) Swimming; Trischa Zorn (USA) (12–0–0) Swimming
1992	winners	table	Barcelona, Spain	490	490	487	526	1503	Bart Dodson (USA) (8–0–0) Athletics; Christopher Holmes (GBR) (6–1–0) Swimming; Trischa Zorn (USA) (10–0–0) Swimming
1996	winners	table	Atlanta, United States	518	518	517	542	1577	Duane Kale (NZL) (4–1–1) Swimming; Priya Cooper (AUS) (5–1–1) Swimming
2000	winners	table	Sydney, Australia	550	550	549	558	1657	Mayumi Narita (JPN) (6–1–0) Swimming; Siobhan Paton (AUS) (6–0–0) Swimming
2004	winners	table	Athens, Greece	519	519	518	533	1570	Jonas Jacobsson (SWE) (4–0–0) Shooting; Erin Popovich (USA) (7–0–0) Swimming; Benoît Huot (CAN) (5–1–0) Swimming; Natalie du Toit (RSA) (5–1–0) Swimming; Chui Yee Yu (HKG) (4–0–0) Wheelchair fencing
2008	winners	table	Beijing, China	473	473	471	487	1431	Chantal Petitclerc (CAN) (5–0–0) Athletics; Jessica Long (USA) (4–1–1) Swimming
2012	winners	table	London, United Kingdom	503	503	503	516	1522	Jacqueline Freney (AUS) (8–0–0) Swimming; Daniel Dias (BRA) (6–0–0) Swimming; Matthew Cowdrey (AUS) (5–2–1) Swimming; Jessica Long (USA) (5–2–1) Swimming
2016	winners	table	Rio de Janeiro, Brazil	529	529	529	539	1597	Daniel Dias (BRA) (5–3–2) Swimming; Denys Dubrov (UKR) (3–3–2) Swimming
2020	winners	table	Tokyo, Japan	539	539	540	589	1668	Maksym Krypak (UKR) (5–1–1) Swimming
2024	winners	table	Paris, France	549	549	551	607	1707	Jiang Yuyan (CHN) (6–0–0); Wen Xiaoyan (CHN) (4–0–0); Poppy Maskill (GBR) (3–2–0)

=== Winter Paralympic Games ===
Games	Medal		Host	Number of medal events	Medals awarded				Athlete(s) with the most medals (Gold-Silver-Bronze)
Games	Medal		Host	Number of medal events	Gold	Silver	Bronze	Total	Athlete(s) with the most medals (Gold-Silver-Bronze)
1976	winners	table	Örnsköldsvik, Sweden	53	53	46	42	141	Heinz Moser (AUT) (3–0–0) Alpine skiing Petra Merkott (FRG) (3–0–0) Alpine skiing Teuvo Sahi (FIN) (3–0–0) Cross-country skiing
1980	winners	table	Geilo, Norway	63	63	54	51	168	Jouko Grip (FIN) (3–0–0) Cross-country skiing Desiree Johannsom (NOR) (5–0–0) Cross-country skiing and ice sledge speed racing
1984	winners	table	Innsbruck, Austria	107	107	106	102	315	Paul Dibello (USA) (4–0–0) Alpine skiing Gunilla Ahren (SWE) (4–0–0); Lahja Hämäläinen (FIN) (4–0–0) Ice sledge speed skating
1988	winners	table	Innsbruck, Austria	96	96	93	90	279	Reinhold Möller (FRG) (3–0–0) Alpine skiing Knut Lundstroem (NOR) (4–0–0) Ice sledge speed racing Ragnhild Myklebust (NOR) (5–1–0) Ice sledge speed racing and cross-country skiing
1992	winners	table	Albertville, France	79	79	78	78	235	Reinhold Moeller (GER) (4–0–0) Alpine skiing Nikolai Ilioutchenko (EUN) (3–0–0) Cross-country skiing
1994	winners	table	Lillehammer, Norway	133	125	124	122	371	Brian Santos (USA) (4–0–0) Alpine skiing Reinhold Moeller (GER) (4–0–0) Alpine skiing Ragnhild Myklebust (NOR) (5–2–1) Ice sledge speed racing and cross-country skiing Terjo Løvaas (NOR) (4–0–0) Cross-country skiing
1998	winners	table	Nagano, Japan	122	122	122	123	367	Madga Arno (ESP) (4–0–0) Alpine skiing Knut Lundstroem (NOR) (4–0–0) Ice sledge speed racing Wakako Tsuchida (JPN) (2–2–0) Ice sledge speed racing Ragnhild Myklebust (NOR) (4–0–0) Cross-country skiing
2002	winners	table	Salt Lake City, United States	92	92	92	92	276	Martin Braxenthaler (GER) (4–0–0) Alpine skiing Sarah Will (USA) (4–0–0) Alpine skiing Ragnhild Myklebust (NOR) (4–0–0) Cross-country skiing
2006	winners	table	Turin, Italy	58	58	58	58	174	Olena Iurkovska (UKR) (4–1–1) Biathlon and cross-country skiing
2010	winners	table	Vancouver, British Columbia, Canada	64	64	65	63	192	Lauren Woolstencroft (CAN) (3–0–0) Alpine skiing Nikolay Polukhin; Guide: Andrey Tokarev (RUS) (1–4–1) Cross-country skiing
2014	winners	table	Sochi, Russia	72	72	72	72	216	Anna Schaffelhuber (GER) (5–0–0) Alpine skiing Alexey Bugaev (RUS) (2–2–1) Alpine skiing
2018	winners	table	Pyeongchang, South Korea	80	80	80	81	241	Henrieta Farkašová (SVK) (4–1–0) Alpine skiing Ekaterina Rumyantseva (NPA) (3–1–0) Biathlon and cross-country skiing
2022	winners	table	Beijing, China	78	78	78	78	234	Jesper Pedersen (NOR) (4–1–0) Alpine skiing

== See also ==
- List of multiple Paralympic gold medalists
- Lists of Olympic medalists
- List of sport awards
