= Cross-country skiing at the 1980 Winter Paralympics =

Cross-country skiing

Cross-country skiing at the II Paralympic Winter Games

Cross-country skiing at the 1980 Winter Paralympics consisted of 28 events, 18 for men and 10 for women.

== Medal table ==
Rank	Nation	Gold medal	Silver medal	Bronze medal	Total
1	Finland (FIN)	14	7	9	29
2	Norway (NOR)	9	7	4	20
3	Sweden (SWE)	5	3	5	13
4	West Germany (FRG)	0	4	2	5
5	Austria (AUT)	0	1	0	1
5	France (FRA)	0	1	0	1
7	Canada (CAN)	0	0	1	1
7	Switzerland (SUI)	0	0	1	1
Total		28	23	22	73

== Medal summary ==
The competition events were:

- 5 km: men - women
- 10 km: men - women
- 20 km: men
- 4x5 km relay: men - women
- 4x10 km relay: men

Each event had separate standing, sitting, or visually impaired classifications:

- 1A - standing: single leg amputation above the knee
- 2A - standing: single leg amputation below the knee
- 2B - standing: double leg amputation below the knee, mild cerebral palsy, or equivalent impairment
- 3A - standing: single arm amputation
- 3B - standing: double arm amputation
- 5 - sitting
- 5A - visually impaired: under 10% functional vision
- 5B - visually impaired: no functional vision

=== Men's events ===
Event	Class	Gold	Silver	Bronze
5 km - short distance	1A	Pertti Sankilampi; Finland	Samuli Kaemi; Finland	Otto Malkki; Finland
5 km - short distance	2A	Veikko Jantunen; Finland	Gerard Vandel; France	Bertil Lundmark; Sweden
5 km - short distance	2B	Ensio Kinnunen; Finland	Franz Sliwinski; West Germany	None
5 km - short distance	3A	Jouko Grip; Finland	Erkki Seppaenen; Finland	Rune Karlsson; Sweden
5 km - short distance	3A	Jouko Grip; Finland	Erkki Seppaenen; Finland	Heikki Miettinen; Finland
5 km - short distance	3B	Kari Laakkonen; Finland	Reino Vesander; Finland	Adolf Fritsche; West Germany
5 km - short distance	5	Erik Sandbraaten; Norway	None	None
10 km - middle distance	1A	Pertti Sankilampi; Finland	Samuli Kaemi; Finland	Tauno Seppaenen; Finland
10 km - middle distance	2A	Veikko Jantunen; Finland	Erkki Kukkanen; Finland	Bertil Lundmark; Sweden
10 km - middle distance	2B	Ensio Kinnunen; Finland	Franz Sliwinski; West Germany	None
10 km - middle distance	3A	Jouko Grip; Finland	Heikki Miettinen; Finland	Erkki Seppaenen; Finland
10 km - middle distance	3B	Cato Zahl Pedersen; Norway	Kari Laakkonen; Finland	Reino Vesander; Finland
10 km - middle distance	5A	Morten Langeroed; Norway	Terje Loevaas; Norway	Torbjoern Foss; Norway
10 km - middle distance	5B	Geir Vegard Alien; Norway	George Witthof; Sweden	Hans Anton Aalien; Norway
20 km - long distance	5A	Terje Loevaas; Norway	Morten Langeroed; Norway	Torbjoern Foss; Norway
20 km - long distance	5B	Hans Anton Aalien; Norway	George Witthof; Sweden	Geir Vegard Alien; Norway
4x5 km relay	1A+2A	Finland (FIN); Veikko Jantunen; Samuli Kaemi; Erkki Kukkanen; Pertti Sankilampi	West Germany (FRG); Hermann Heckel; Helmut Kaidisch; Alfred Kauffmann; Siegfried Loose	Switzerland (SUI); Unknown
4x5 km relay	3A-3B	Finland (FIN); Karin Laakkonen; Jouko Grip; Heikki Miettinen; Erkki Seppänen	Austria (AUT); Bruno Geuze; Franz Perner; Horst Morokutti; Josef Scheiber	West Germany (FRG); Otto Faller; Adolf Fritsche; Walter Klenk; Ludwig Wagner
4x10 km relay	5A-5B	Norway (NOR); Hans Anton Aalien; Geir Vegard Alien; Morten Langeroed; Terje Loevaas	Sweden (SWE); Yngve Eriksson; Ove Karlsson; Sven-Ivar Martin; George Witthof	Finland (FIN); Ismo Alanko; Mauno Sulisalo; Teuvo Talmia; Matti Juntunen

=== Women's events ===
Event	Class	Gold	Silver	Bronze
5 km - short distance	2A	Liisa Maekelae; Finland	None	None
5 km - short distance	5	Brit Mjaasund Oejen; Norway	None	None
5 km - short distance	5A	Desiree Johansson; Sweden	Kari Heggum; Norway	Matleena Talonen; Finland
5 km - short distance	5B	Birgitta Sund; Sweden	Aud Berntsen; Norway	Marianne Edfeldt; Sweden
10 km - middle distance	2A	Liisa Maekelae; Finland	None	None
10 km - middle distance	3A	Alli Hatva; Finland	Dorothea Neuweiler; West Germany	Railli Rantala; Finland
10 km - middle distance	5	Brit Mjaasund Oejen; Norway	None	None
10 km - middle distance	5A	Desiree Johansson; Sweden	Kari Heggum; Norway	Matleena Talonen; Finland
10 km - middle distance	5B	Birgitta Sund; Sweden	Aud Berntsen; Norway	Marianne Edfeldt; Sweden
4x5 km relay	5A-5B	Sweden (SWE); Marianne Edfeldt; Desiree Johansson; Astrid Nilsson; Birgitta Sund	Norway (NOR); Aud Berntsen; Aud Grundvik; Kari Heggum; Aud Jensen	Canada (CAN); Mary Brunner; Dawn Coyle; Janet Schuster; Judy Shaw

== See also ==
- Cross-country skiing at the 1980 Winter Olympics
