= Switzerland at the 1984 Winter Paralympics =

- Flag of Switzerland
- IPC code: SUI
- NPC: Swiss Paralympic Committee
- Website: www.swissparalympic.ch
- Competitors: 50 (42 men and 8 women) in 2 sports
- Medals Ranked 7th: Gold 5 Silver 16 Bronze 16 Total 37

Winter Paralympics appearances (overview)
- 1976; 1980; 1984; 1988; 1992; 1994; 1998; 2002; 2006; 2010; 2014; 2018; 2022; 2026

Switzerland competed at the 1984 Winter Paralympics in Innsbruck, Austria. 50 competitors from Switzerland won 37 medals including 5 gold, 16 silver and 16 bronze and finished 7th in the medal table.

== Alpine skiing ==
The medalists are:

- (gold) Peter Bartlome Men's Alpine Combination LW9
- (gold) Peter Bartlome Men's Giant Slalom LW9
- (gold) Rolf Heinzmann Men's Alpine Combination LW6/8
- (gold) Rolf Heinzmann Men's Downhill LW6/8
- (gold) Rolf Heinzmann Men's Slalom LW6/8
- (silver) Hansueli Feuz Men's Downhill LW9
- (silver) Paul Fournier Men's Alpine Combination LW4
- (silver) Paul Fournier Men's Giant Slalom LW4
- (silver) Paul Fournier Men's Slalom LW4
- (silver) Felix Gisler Men's Alpine Combination LW5/7
- (silver) Felix Gisler Men's Giant Slalom LW5/7
- (silver) Walter Kaelin Men's Alpine Combination LW9
- (silver) Walter Kaelin Men's Giant Slalom LW9
- (silver) Heinz Moser Men's Alpine Combination LW6/8
- (silver) Heinz Moser Men's Downhill LW6/8
- (silver) Paul Neukomm Men's Giant Slalom LW6/8
- (silver) Elisabeth Osterwalder Women's Alpine Combination LW4
- (silver) Edwin Zurbriggen Men's Alpine Combination LW1
- (bronze) Peter Bartlome Men's Downhill LW9
- (bronze) Robert Cadisch Men's Giant Slalom LW9
- (bronze) Eugen Diethelm Men's Giant Slalom LW4
- (bronze) Paul Fournier Men's Downhill LW4
- (bronze) Walter Kaelin Men's Slalom LW9
- (bronze) Jean-Pierre Kurth Men's Giant Slalom B2
- (bronze) Edwin Zurbriggen Men's Giant Slalom LW1

== Cross-country ==
- (silver) Armin Arnold Men's Middle Distance 10 km LW9
- (silver) Armin Arnold Men's Short Distance 5 km LW9
- (silver) Heidi Aviolat, Monika Waelti, Yvonne Wyssen Women's 3x5 km Relay LW2-9
- (bronze) Josef Dietziker Men's Middle Distance 10 km grade II
- (bronze) Josef Dietziker, Heinz Frei, Peter Gilomen Men's 3x2.5 km Relay grade I-II
- (bronze) Josef Dietziker Men's Short Distance 5 km grade II
- (bronze) Heinz Frei Men's Middle Distance 10 km grade I
- (bronze) Peter Gilomen Men's Short Distance 5 km grade I
- (bronze) Karoline Pavlicek Women's Middle Distance 5 km grade II
- (bronze) Karoline Pavlicek Women's Short Distance 2.5 km grade II
- (bronze) Monika Waelti Women's Middle Distance 10 km LW4
- (bronze) Monika Waelti Women's Short Distance 5 km LW4

== See also ==
- Switzerland at the Paralympics
- Switzerland at the 1984 Winter Olympics
