= Alpine skiing at the 1980 Winter Paralympics =

Alpine skiing at the II Paralympic Winter Games

Alpine skiing at the 1980 Winter Paralympics consisted of 22 events, 12 for men and 10 for women.

== Medal table ==
Rank	Nation	Gold medal	Silver medal	Bronze medal	Total
1	Austria (AUT)	6	9	6	21
2	Switzerland (SUI)	4	2	3	9
3	United States (USA)	4	1	1	6
4	West Germany (FRG)	3	2	7	12
5	Canada (CAN)	2	3	0	5
6	Norway (NOR)	2	0	0	2
7	France (FRA)	1	0	1	2
8	Czechoslovakia (TCH)	0	1	0	1
Total		22	18	18	58

== Medal summary ==
The competition events were:

- Giant slalom: men – women
- Slalom: men – women

Each event had separate standing classifications:

- 1A - standing: single leg amputation above the knee
- 2A - standing: single leg amputation below the knee
- 2B - standing: double leg amputation below the knee, mild cerebral palsy, or equivalent impairment
- 3A - standing: single arm amputation
- 3B - standing: double arm amputation
- 4 - standing: amputation of one arm and one leg

=== Men's events ===
Event	Class	Gold	Silver	Bronze
Giant slalom	1A	Peter Perner; Austria	Greg Oswald; Canada	Franz Meister; Austria
Giant slalom	2A	Markus Ramsauer; Austria	Josef Meusburger; Austria	Eugen Diethelm; Switzerland
Giant slalom	2B	Bernard Baudean; France	Gerhard Langer; Austria	Anton Berger; Austria
Giant slalom	3A	Rolf Heinzmann; Switzerland	Heinz Moser; Switzerland	Theo Feger; West Germany
Giant slalom	3B	Cato Zahl Pedersen; Norway	Felix Gisler; Switzerland	Niko Moll; West Germany
Giant slalom	4	Doug Keil; United States	None	None
Slalom	1A	Peter Perner; Austria	Jim Cullen; Canada	Hans Strasser; West Germany
Slalom	2A	Josef Meusburger; Austria	Markus Ramsauer; Austria	Remy Arnod; France
Slalom	2B	Gerhard Langer; Austria	Anton Berger; Austria	Anton Ledermaier; Austria
Slalom	3A	Rolf Heinzmann; Switzerland	Hubert Griessmaier; Austria	Dietmar Schweninger; Austria
Slalom	3B	Cato Zahl Pedersen; Norway	Niko Moll; West Germany	Mathias Berger; West Germany
Slalom	4	Doug Keil; United States	None	None

=== Women's events ===
Event	Class	Gold	Silver	Bronze
Giant slalom	1A	Annemie Schneider; West Germany	Christine Winkler; Austria	Brigitte Rajchl; Austria
Giant slalom	2A	Lana Spreeman; Canada	Lorna Manzer; Canada	Janet Penn; United States
Giant slalom	2B	Elisabeth Osterwalder; Switzerland	None	None
Giant slalom	3A	Cindy Castellano; United States	Kathy Poohachof; United States	Franciane Fischer; Switzerland
Giant slalom	3B	Brigitte Madlener; Austria	Sabine Barisch; West Germany	Sabine Stiefbold; West Germany
Slalom	1A	Annemie Schneider; West Germany	Christine Winkler; Austria	Ursula Steiger; Austria
Slalom	2A	Lorna Manzer; Canada	Heidi Jauk; Austria	Reinhilde Moller; West Germany
Slalom	2B	Elisabeth Osterwalder; Switzerland	None	None
Slalom	3A	Cindy Castellano; United States	Eva Lemežová-Příhodová; Czechoslovakia	Franciane Fischer; Switzerland
Slalom	3B	Sabine Barisch; West Germany	Brigitte Madlener; Austria	Evelyn Werner; West Germany

== See also ==
- Alpine skiing at the 1980 Winter Olympics
