= West Germany at the 1976 Winter Paralympics =

- Flag of Germany
- IPC code: FRG (GER used at these Games)
- NPC: National Paralympic Committee Germany
- Website: www.dbs-npc.de (in German)

in Örnsköldsvik
- Medals Ranked 1st: Gold 10 Silver 12 Bronze 6 Total 28

Winter Paralympics appearances (overview)
- 1976; 1980; 1984; 1988; 1992; 1994; 1998; 2002; 2006; 2010; 2014; 2018; 2022; 2026

West Germany competed at the 1976 Winter Paralympics in Örnsköldsvik, Sweden from February 21 to 28, 1976. The team finished first out of the sixteen competing nations in the medal table and won twenty eight medals: ten gold, twelve silver and six bronze. Athletes from West Germany competed in 76 events in two sports: Alpine Skiing and Cross Country Skiing. West Germany won 17 medals in Alpine Skiing: eight gold, seven silver and two bronze, whereas it won 15 medals in Cross Country Skiing: two gold, seven silver and six bronze.

== Disability classifications ==
The Paralympics groups athletes' disabilities into one of five disability categories; amputation, the condition may be congenital or sustained through injury or illness; cerebral palsy; wheelchair athletes, there is often overlap between this and other categories; visual impairment, including blindness; Les autres, any physical disability that does not fall strictly under one of the other categories, for example dwarfism or multiple sclerosis. Each Paralympic sport then has its own classifications, dependent upon the specific physical demands of competition. Events are given a code, made of numbers and letters, describing the type of event and classification of the athletes competing.

== Alpine Skiing ==
Petra Merkott won three gold medals in Women's Alpine Combination IV B, Women's Giant Slalom IV B and Women's Slalom IV B. Annemie Schneider also won three gold medals in Women's Alpine Combination IB, Women's Giant Slalom I and Women's Slalom I. Other medalists included Traudl Weber, who won three silver medal; Hans Strasser who won one gold, one silver and one bronze; Richard Prager who won two silver medals; Ulli Helmbold who won one gold; and Peter Braun who won one bronze.

== See also ==
- West Germany at the 1976 Winter Olympics
