= List of Paralympic medals by host nation =

Tabulated below are the medals and overall rankings for host nations in each Summer Paralympics and Winter Paralympics, based on individual Games medals tables.

== Summer Paralympics ==
Ranked first

Games	Host nation	Gold	Silver	Bronze	Total	Rank
1960	Italy	29	28	23	80	1
1964	Japan	1	5	4	10	13
1968	Israel	18	21	23	62	3
1972	West Germany	28	17	22	57	1
1976	Canada	25	26	26	77	6
1980	Netherlands	33	31	36	100	6
1984	United States	136	131	129	396	1
1984	Great Britain	107	112	112	331	2
1988	South Korea	40	35	19	94	7
1992	Spain	39	32	49	120	4
1996	United States	47	46	66	159	1
2000	Australia	63	39	47	149	1
2004	Greece	3	13	4	20	34
2008	China	89	70	52	211	1
2012	Great Britain	34	43	43	120	3
2016	Brazil	14	29	29	72	8
2020	Japan	13	15	23	51	11
2024	France	19	28	28	75	8
2028	United States					
2032	Australia					

== Winter Paralympics ==
Ranked first

Games	Host nation	Gold	Silver	Bronze	Total	Rank
1976	Sweden	6	7	7	20	5
1980	Norway	23	21	10	54	1
1984	Austria	34	19	17	70	1
1988	Austria	20	10	14	34	2
1992	France	6	4	9	19	6
1994	Norway	29	25	13	64	1
1998	Japan	12	16	13	41	5
2002	United States	10	22	11	34	2
2006	Italy	2	2	4	8	9
2010	Canada	10	5	4	19	3
2014	Russia	30	28	22	80	1
2018	South Korea	1	0	2	3	16
2022	China	18	20	23	61	1
2026	Italy					
2030	France					
2034	United States					
