= Alpine skiing at the 1976 Winter Paralympics =

Alpine skiing at the I Paralympic Winter Games

Alpine skiing at the 1976 Winter Paralympics consisted of 28 events, 15 for men and 13 for women.

== Medal table ==
Rank	Nation	Gold medal	Silver medal	Bronze medal	Total
1	Switzerland (SUI)	9	1	0	10
2	West Germany (FRG)	8	7	2	17
3	Austria (AUT)	5	16	13	34
4	Czechoslovakia (TCH)	3	0	0	3
5	France (FRA)	2	0	3	5
6	Canada (CAN)	1	0	2	3
Total		28	24	20	72

== Medal summary ==
The competition events were:

- Giant slalom: men – women
- Slalom: men – women
- Alpine combination: men – women

Each event had separate standing classifications:

- I - standing, single leg amputation above the knee
- II - standing, single leg amputation below the knee
- III - standing, single arm amputation
- IV A - standing, double leg amputation below the knee, mild cerebral palsy, or equivalent impairment
- IV B - standing, double arm amputation

=== Men's events ===
Event	Class	Gold	Silver	Bronze
Giant slalom	I	Ulli Helmbold; West Germany	Hans Strasser; West Germany	Franz Meister; Austria
Giant slalom	II	Eugen Diethelm; Switzerland	Herbert Millendorfer; Austria	Remy Arnod; France
Giant slalom	III	Heinz Moser; Switzerland	Manfred Brandl; Austria	Franz Perner; Austria
Giant slalom	IV A	Bernard Baudean; France	Anton Berger; Austria	Anton Ledermaier; Austria
Giant slalom	IV B	Adolf Hagn; Austria	Horst Morokutti; Austria	Peter Braun; West Germany
Slalom	I	Franz Meister; Austria	Peter Perner; Austria	Hans Strasser; West Germany
Slalom	II	Josef Meusburger; Austria	Peter Portisch; West Germany	Herbert Millendorfer; Austria
Slalom	III	Heinz Moser; Switzerland	Manfred Brandl; Austria	Franz Perner; Austria
Slalom	IV A	John Gow; Canada	Richard Prager; West Germany	Bernard Baudean; France
Slalom	IV B	Felix Gisler; Switzerland	Horst Morokutti; Austria	Willi Berger; Austria
Alpine combination	I	Hans Strasser; West Germany	Franz Meister; Austria	Walter Laurer; Austria
Alpine combination	II	Herbert Millendorfer; Austria	Eugen Diethelm; Switzerland	Remy Arnod; France
Alpine combination	III	Heinz Moser; Switzerland	Manfred Brandl; Austria	Franz Perner; Austria
Alpine combination	IV A	Bernard Baudean; France	Richard Prager; West Germany	Anton Berger; Austria
Alpine combination	IV B	Horst Morokutti; Austria	Adolf Hagn; Austria	Willi Berger; Austria

=== Women's events ===
Event	Class	Gold	Silver	Bronze
Giant slalom	I	Annemie Schneider; West Germany	Brigitte Rajchl; Austria	Ursula Steiger; Austria
Giant slalom	II	Irene Moillen; Switzerland	Heidi Jauk; Austria	Lorna Manzer; Canada
Giant slalom	III	Eva Lemežová-Příhodová; Czechoslovakia	Traudl Weber; West Germany	None
Giant slalom	IV A	Elisabeth Osterwalder; Switzerland	None	None
Giant slalom	IV B	Petra Merkott; West Germany	None	None
Slalom	I	Annemie Schneider; West Germany	Ursula Steiger; Austria	Brigitte Rajchl; Austria
Slalom	II	Irene Moillen; Switzerland	Heidi Jauk; Austria	Lorna Manzer; Canada
Slalom	III	Eva Lemežová-Příhodová; Czechoslovakia	Traudl Weber; West Germany	None
Slalom	IV B	Petra Merkott; West Germany	None	None
Alpine combination	I	Annemie Schneider; West Germany	Brigitte Rajchl; Austria	Ursula Steiger; Austria
Alpine combination	II	Irene Moillen; Switzerland	Heidi Jauk; Austria	None
Alpine combination	III	Eva Lemežová-Příhodová; Czechoslovakia	Traudl Weber; West Germany	None
Alpine combination	IV B	Petra Merkott; West Germany	None	None

== See also ==
- Alpine skiing at the 1976 Winter Olympics
