= Austria at the 1976 Winter Paralympics =

- Flag of Austria
- IPC code: AUT
- NPC: Austrian Paralympic Committee

in Örnsköldsvik, Sweden
- Competitors: 24 (20 men and 4 women) in 2 sports
- Medals Ranked 6th: Gold 5 Silver 16 Bronze 14 Total 35

Winter Paralympics appearances (overview)
- 1976; 1980; 1984; 1988; 1992; 1994; 1998; 2002; 2006; 2010; 2014; 2018; 2022; 2026

Austria competed at the 1976 Winter Paralympics in Örnsköldsvik, Sweden. 24 competitors from Austria won 35 medals including 5 gold, 16 silver and 14 bronze and finished 6th in the medal table.

== Alpine skiing ==
The medalists are:

- (gold) Adolf Hagn, Men's Giant Slalom IV B
- (gold) Franz Meister, Men's Slalom I
- (gold) Josef Meusburger, Men's Slalom II
- (gold) Herbert Millendorfer, Men's Alpine Combination II
- (gold) Horst Morokutti, Men's Alpine Combination IV B
- (silver) Anton Berger, Men's Giant Slalom IV A
- (silver) Manfred Brandl, Men's Alpine Combination III
- (silver) Manfred Brandl, Men's Giant Slalom III
- (silver) Manfred Brandl, Men's Slalom III
- (silver) Adolf Hagn, Men's Alpine Combination IV B
- (silver) Heidi Jauk, Women's Alpine Combination II
- (silver) Heidi Jauk, Women's Giant Slalom II
- (silver) Heidi Jauk, Women's Slalom II
- (silver) Franz Meister, Men's Alpine Combination I
- (silver) Herbert Millendorfer, Men's Giant Slalom II
- (silver) Horst Morokutti, Men's Giant Slalom IV B
- (silver) Horst Morokutti, Men's Slalom IV B
- (silver) Peter Perner, Men's Slalom I
- (silver) Brigitte Rajchl, Women's Alpine Combination I
- (silver) Brigitte Rajchl, Women's Giant Slalom I
- (silver) Ursula Steiger, Women's Slalom I
- (bronze) Anton Berger, Men's Alpine Combination IV A
- (bronze) Willi Berger, Men's Alpine Combination IV B
- (bronze) Willi Berger, Men's Slalom IV B
- (bronze) Walter Laurer, Men's Alpine Combination I
- (bronze) Anton Ledermaier, Men's Giant Slalom IV A
- (bronze) Franz Meister, Men's Giant Slalom I
- (bronze) Herbert Millendorfer, Men's Slalom II
- (bronze) Franz Perner, Men's Alpine Combination III
- (bronze) Franz Perner, Men's Giant Slalom III
- (bronze) Franz Perner, Men's Slalom III
- (bronze) Brigitte Rajchl, Women's Slalom I
- (bronze) Ursula Steiger, Women's Alpine Combination I
- (bronze) Ursula Steiger, Women's Giant Slalom I

== Cross-country ==
The medalists are:

- (bronze) Wolfgang Pickl, Josef Scheiber, Eugen Wilhelm Men's 3x10 km Relay III-IV B

== See also ==
- Austria at the Paralympics
- Austria at the 1976 Winter Olympics
