= Uganda at the 1980 Winter Paralympics =

- IPC code: UGA
- NPC: Uganda National Paralympic Committee

in Geilo
- Competitors: 1 in 1 sport
- Medals Ranked 11 (joint last)th: Gold 0 Silver 0 Bronze 0 Total 0

Winter Paralympics appearances (overview)
- 1976; 1980; 1984–2026

Uganda competed at the 1980 Winter Paralympics in Geilo, Norway.

== Team ==
As in 1976, the country entered only one athlete, Tofiri Kibuuka, who competed in cross-country skiing and did not win any medals. Kibuuka would later naturalize in Norway, and go on to represent Norway at the Summer Paralympics at the 1984, 1988 and 1992 Games.

== Background ==
As in 1976, also, Uganda was the only African country to compete at the Games. And as in 1976, Uganda was the only country to compete at the 1980 Winter Paralympics but not at the 1980 Winter Olympics.

Uganda has not competed again at the Winter Paralympic Games since 1980, although it continues to compete in the Summer Paralympic Games. The country's only Winter Paralympian, Tofiri Kibuuka, had acquired Norwegian nationality by 1984, and henceforth competed for Norway.

== Cross-country skiing ==
Uganda's sole representative, Tofiri Kibuuka, competed in two events.

- In the Men's middle distance 10 km (category 5B), he finished 12th (out of 31), with a time of 49:52.
- In the Men's long distance 20 km (category 5B), he finished 11th (out of 30), with a time of 1:42:17.
