= Eva Lemežová-Příhodová =

Czech Paralympic alpine skier

Sport
- Country: Czechoslovakia
- Sport: Alpine skiing
Medal record
Alpine skiing
Representing Czechoslovakia
Paralympic Games
Gold medal – first place	1976 Örnsköldsvik	Alpine combination III
Gold medal – first place	1976 Örnsköldsvik	Giant slalom III
Gold medal – first place	1976 Örnsköldsvik	Slalom III
Silver medal – second place	1980 Geilo	Slalom 3A

Eva Lemežová-Příhodová is a Czech Paralympic alpine skier. She competed for Czechoslovakia in the 1976 and 1980 Winter Paralympics. She won four medals, three gold, and one silver.

== Career ==
At the 1976 Paralympic Winter Games in Örnsköldsvik, she won three gold medals: in slalom III (time 2:03.74), giant slalom III (time 2:25.49), and in super combined III, ahead of West German athlete, Traudl Weber.

At the 1980 Winter Paralympics in Geilo, she finished second in the 3A slalom, with a time of 1:39.93, behind the American Cindy Castellano in 1:25.84. She was fourth in the giant slalom, with a time of 3:07.95 (behind Cindy Castellano in 2:39.58, Kathy Poohachof in 2:42.58 and Franciane Fischer with 2:52.27).
