= Anton Ledermaier =

Austrian para-alpine skier

Sport
- Country: Austria
- Sport: Para-alpine skiing
Medal record
Paralympic Games
| Bronze medal – third place | 1976 Örnsköldsvik | Giant Slalom IV A |
| Bronze medal – third place | 1980 Geilo | Slalom 2B |

Anton Ledermaier is an Austrian para-alpine skier. He represented Austria at the 1976 Winter Paralympics and at the 1980 Winter Paralympics.

His win at the 1980 Slalom 2B event formed part of a medal sweep as Gerhard Langer and Anton Berger, both representing Austria as well, won the gold and silver medals respectively.

== Achievements ==
| Year | Competition | Location | Position | Event | Time |
|---|---|---|---|---|---|
| 1976 | 1976 Winter Paralympics | Örnsköldsvik, Sweden | 3rd | Giant Slalom IV A | 3:45.88 |
| 1980 | 1980 Winter Paralympics | Geilo, Norway | 3rd | Slalom 2B | 2:01.86 |

== See also ==
- List of Paralympic medalists in alpine skiing
