= Eugen Diethelm =

Swiss para-alpine skier

Sport
- Country: Switzerland
- Sport: Para-alpine skiing
Medal record
Paralympic Games
| Gold medal – first place | 1976 Örnsköldsvik | Giant Slalom II |
| Silver medal – second place | 1976 Örnsköldsvik | Alpine Combination II |
| Bronze medal – third place | 1980 Geilo | Giant Slalom 2A |
| Bronze medal – third place | 1984 Innsbruck | Giant Slalom LW4 |

Eugen Diethelm is a Swiss para-alpine skier. He represented Switzerland at the 1976 Winter Paralympics, at the 1980 Winter Paralympics and at the 1984 Winter Paralympics. In total, he won one gold medal, one silver medal and one bronze medal.

He also competed in the Men's giant slalom for above-knee amputees event at disabled skiing, a demonstration sport at the 1984 Winter Olympics.

== Achievements ==
| Year | Competition | Location | Position | Event | Time |
|---|---|---|---|---|---|
| 1976 | 1976 Winter Paralympics | Örnsköldsvik, Sweden | 1st | Giant Slalom II | 2:47.83 |
| 1976 | 1976 Winter Paralympics | Örnsköldsvik, Sweden | 2nd | Alpine Combination II | 0:47.52 |
| 1980 | 1980 Winter Paralympics | Geilo, Norway | 3rd | Giant Slalom 2A | 2:26.93 |
| 1984 | 1984 Winter Paralympics | Innsbruck, Austria | 3rd | Giant Slalom LW4 | 1:26.46 |

== See also ==
- List of Paralympic medalists in alpine skiing
