= Poland at the 1976 Winter Paralympics =

- IPC code: POL
- NPC: Polish Paralympic Committee
- Website: www.paralympic.org.pl

in Örnsköldsvik
- Competitors: 7 in 2 sports
- Medals: Gold 0 Silver 0 Bronze 0 Total 0

Winter Paralympics appearances (overview)
- 1976; 1980; 1984; 1988; 1992; 1994; 1998; 2002; 2006; 2010; 2014; 2018; 2022; 2026

Poland competed at the 1976 Winter Paralympics in Örnsköldsvik, Sweden.

== Alpine skiing ==
Athlete	Event	Final	
Athlete	Event	Run	Rank
Stanisław Bednarz	Giant slalom III	3:36.93	12
Ryszard Suder	Slalom III	1:36.39	8
Franciszek Tracz	Slalom IVA	2:24.38	6
Tadeusz Zajączkowski	Slalom II	3:34.97	15

== Cross‑country skiing ==
Athlete	Event	Final	
Athlete	Event	Finish Time	Rank
Tadeusz Chwiejczak	Standing 5 km Classic III	20:56.0	DQ
Tadeusz Chwiejczak	Standing 10 km Free III	0:45:27.0	6
Zdzisław Olszewski	Standing 5 km Classic II	33:44.0	17
Aleksander Popławski	Standing 5 km Classic I	38:44.0	9
Tadeusz Zajączkowski	Standing 5 km Classic II	30:53.0	16
Zdzisław Olszewski; Aleksander Popławski; Tadeusz Zajączkowski	3 x 5 km Relay Standing I-II	1:19:35.0	5

== See also ==
- Poland at the Paralympics
- Poland at the 1976 Winter Olympics
