= Irene Moillen =

Swiss para-alpine skier

Sport
- Country: Switzerland
- Sport: Para-alpine skiing
Medal record
Paralympic Games
Gold medal – first place	1976 Örnsköldsvik	Alpine Combination II
Gold medal – first place	1976 Örnsköldsvik	Giant Slalom II
Gold medal – first place	1976 Örnsköldsvik	Slalom II

Irene Moillen is a Swiss para-alpine skier.

Moillen represented Switzerland in alpine skiing at the 1976 Winter Paralympics. She also represented Switzerland at the 1980 Winter Paralympics. She won three gold medals at the 1976 Winter Paralympics.

== Achievements ==
Year	Competition	Location	Position	Event	Time
1976	1976 Winter Paralympics	Örnsköldsvik, Sweden	1st	Alpine Combination II	0:00.00
1976	1976 Winter Paralympics	Örnsköldsvik, Sweden	1st	Giant Slalom II	1:55.51
1976	1976 Winter Paralympics	Örnsköldsvik, Sweden	1st	Slalom II	1:55.98

== See also ==
- List of Paralympic medalists in alpine skiing
