= Anton Berger =

Austrian para-alpine skier

Sport
- Country: Austria
- Sport: Para-alpine skiing
Medal record
Paralympic Games
Silver medal – second place	1976 Örnsköldsvik	Giant Slalom IV A
Bronze medal – third place	1976 Örnsköldsvik	Alpine Combination IV A
Silver medal – second place	1980 Geilo	Slalom 2B
Bronze medal – third place	1980 Geilo	Giant Slalom 2B

Anton Berger is an Austrian para-alpine skier. He represented Austria at the 1976 Winter Paralympics and at the 1980 Winter Paralympics and, in total, he won two silver medals and two bronze medals at the Winter Paralympics.

His win at the 1980 Slalom 2B event formed part of a medal sweep as Gerhard Langer and Anton Ledermaier, both representing Austria as well, won the gold and bronze medals respectively.

== Achievements ==
Year	Competition	Location	Position	Event	Time
1976	1976 Winter Paralympics	Örnsköldsvik, Sweden	2nd	Giant Slalom IV A	3:33.08
1976	1976 Winter Paralympics	Örnsköldsvik, Sweden	3rd	Alpine Combination IV A	2:10.29
1980	1980 Winter Paralympics	Geilo, Norway	2nd	Slalom 2B	2:01.65
1980	1980 Winter Paralympics	Geilo, Norway	3rd	Giant Slalom 2B	2:54.39

== See also ==
- List of Paralympic medalists in alpine skiing
