= Alpine skiing at the 1988 Winter Paralympics – Women's slalom LW10 =

Women's slalom LW10 at the IV Paralympic Winter Games
- Paralympic Alpine Skiing
- Venue: Innsbruck
- Dates: January 1988
- Competitors: 3 from 3 nations

Medalists
1st place, gold medalist(s)		Francoise Jacquerod	Switzerland
2nd place, silver medalist(s)		none awarded	
3rd place, bronze medalist(s)		none awarded	

The women's slalom LW10 was one of the events held in Alpine skiing at the 1988 Winter Paralympics in Innsbruck.

There were 3 competitors in the final.

Switzerland's Francoise Jacquerod set a time of 2:19.79, taking the gold medal. Since only Jacquerod finished the race, she was the only winner of a medal.

== Results ==
=== Final ===
Rank	Athlete	Time
1st place, gold medalist(s)	Francoise Jacquerod (SUI)	2:19.79
	Emiko Ikeda (JPN)	DSQ
	Marilyn Hamilton (USA)	DNF
