= Ursula Steiger =

Austrian para-alpine skier

Sport
- Country: Austria
- Sport: Para-alpine skiing
Medal record
Paralympic Games
Silver medal – second place	1976 Örnsköldsvik	Slalom I
Bronze medal – third place	1976 Örnsköldsvik	Giant Slalom I
Bronze medal – third place	1976 Örnsköldsvik	Alpine Combination I
Bronze medal – third place	1980 Geilo	Slalom 1A

Ursula Steiger (14 August 1942 - 21 February 2025) was an Austrian para-alpine skier. She represented Austria at the 1976 Winter Paralympics and at the 1980 Winter Paralympics. In total, she won one silver medal and three bronze medals in alpine skiing.

== Achievements ==
Year	Competition	Location	Position	Event	Time
1976	1976 Winter Paralympics	Örnsköldsvik, Sweden	2nd	Women's Slalom I	1:48.05
1976	1976 Winter Paralympics	Örnsköldsvik, Sweden	3rd	Women's Giant Slalom I	1:48.62
1976	1976 Winter Paralympics	Örnsköldsvik, Sweden	3rd	Women's Alpine Combination I	1:55.48
1980	1980 Winter Paralympics	Geilo, Norway	3rd	Women's Slalom 1A	1:35.03

== See also ==
- List of Paralympic medalists in alpine skiing
