= Switzerland at the 1976 Winter Paralympics =

- Flag of Switzerland
- IPC code: SUI
- NPC: Swiss Paralympic Committee
- Website: www.swissparalympic.ch
- Competitors: 15 (11 men and 4 women) in 2 sports
- Medals Ranked 2nd: Gold 10 Silver 1 Bronze 1 Total 12

Winter Paralympics appearances (overview)
- 1976; 1980; 1984; 1988; 1992; 1994; 1998; 2002; 2006; 2010; 2014; 2018; 2022; 2026

Switzerland competed at the 1976 Winter Paralympics in Örnsköldsvik, Sweden. 15 competitors from Switzerland won 12 medals including 10 gold, 1 silver and 1 bronze and finished 2nd in the medal table.

== Alpine skiing ==
The medalists are:

- (gold) Eugen Diethelm Men's Giant Slalom II
- (gold) Felix Gisler Men's Slalom IV B
- (gold) Irene Moillen Women's Alpine Combination II
- (gold) Irene Moillen Women's Giant Slalom II
- (gold) Irene Moillen Women's Slalom II
- (gold) Heinz Moser Men's Alpine Combination III
- (gold) Heinz Moser Men's Giant Slalom III
- (gold) Heinz Moser Men's Slalom III
- (gold) Elisabeth Osterwalder Women's Giant Slalom IV A
- (silver) Eugen Diethelm Men's Alpine Combination II

== Cross-country ==
Five athletes represented Switzerland in cross-country skiing. One athlete won two medals:

- (gold) Germain Oberli Men's Short Distance 10 km A
- (bronze) Germain Oberli Men's Middle Distance 15 km A

== See also ==
- Switzerland at the Paralympics
- Switzerland at the 1976 Winter Olympics
