= Remy Arnod =

French para-alpine skier

Sport
- Country: France
- Sport: Para-alpine skiing
Medal record
Paralympic Games
Bronze medal – third place	1976 Örnsköldsvik	Giant Slalom II
Bronze medal – third place	1976 Örnsköldsvik	Alpine Combination II
Bronze medal – third place	1980 Geilo	Slalom 2A

Remy Arnod is a French para-alpine skier. He represented France at the 1976 Winter Paralympics, at the 1980 Winter Paralympics and at the 1984 Winter Paralympics.

In total, he won three bronze medals in alpine skiing: two at the 1976 Winter Paralympics and one at the 1980 Winter Paralympics.

== Achievements ==
Year	Competition	Location	Position	Event	Time
1976	1976 Winter Paralympics	Örnsköldsvik, Sweden	3rd	Giant Slalom II	2:50.97
1976	1976 Winter Paralympics	Örnsköldsvik, Sweden	3rd	Alpine Combination II	1:17.35
1980	1980 Winter Paralympics	Geilo, Norway	3rd	Slalom 2A	1:39.51

== See also ==
- List of Paralympic medalists in alpine skiing
