= Peter Perner =

Austrian para-alpine skier

Sport
- Country: Austria
- Sport: Para-alpine skiing
Medal record
Paralympic Games
Silver medal – second place	1976 Örnsköldsvik	Slalom I
Gold medal – first place	1980 Geilo	Giant Slalom 1A
Gold medal – first place	1980 Geilo	Slalom 1A
Bronze medal – third place	1984 Innsbruck	Giant Slalom LW2
Silver medal – second place	1984 Innsbruck	Alpine Combination LW2

Peter Perner is an Austrian para-alpine skier. He represented Austria at five Winter Paralympics: 1976, 1980, 1984, 1988 and 1992.

In total, he won two gold medals, two silver medals and one bronze medal at the Winter Paralympics.

He also competed at the Men's giant slalom for single-leg amputees event at disabled skiing, a demonstration sport during the 1984 Winter Olympics.

== Achievements ==
Year	Competition	Location	Position	Event	Time
1976	1976 Winter Paralympics	Örnsköldsvik, Sweden	2nd	Slalom I	1:28.97
1980	1980 Winter Paralympics	Geilo, Norway	1st	Giant Slalom 1A	2:30.58
1980	1980 Winter Paralympics	Geilo, Norway	1st	Slalom 1A	1:41.75
1984	1984 Winter Paralympics	Innsbruck, Austria	3rd	Giant Slalom LW2	1:30.44
1984	1984 Winter Paralympics	Innsbruck, Austria	2nd	Alpine Combination LW2	0:57.23

== See also ==
- List of Paralympic medalists in alpine skiing
