= Heidi Jauk =

Austrian para-alpine skier

Sport
- Country: Austria
- Sport: Para-alpine skiing
Medal record
Paralympic Games
Silver medal – second place	1976 Örnsköldsvik	Slalom II
Silver medal – second place	1976 Örnsköldsvik	Giant Slalom II
Silver medal – second place	1976 Örnsköldsvik	Alpine Combination II
Silver medal – second place	1980 Geilo	Slalom 2A

Heidi Jauk is an Austrian para-alpine skier. She represented Austria at the 1976 Winter Paralympics and at the 1980 Winter Paralympics and in total she won four silver medals.

== Achievements ==
Year	Competition	Location	Position	Event	Time
1976	1976 Winter Paralympics	Örnsköldsvik, Sweden	2nd	Slalom II	1:56.57
1976	1976 Winter Paralympics	Örnsköldsvik, Sweden	2nd	Giant Slalom II	1:55.79
1976	1976 Winter Paralympics	Örnsköldsvik, Sweden	2nd	Alpine Combination II	0:04.26
1980	1980 Winter Paralympics	Geilo, Norway	2nd	Slalom 2A	1:33.11

== See also ==
- List of Paralympic medalists in alpine skiing
