= Brigitte Rajchl =

Austrian para-alpine skier

Sport
- Country: Austria
- Sport: Para-alpine skiing
Medal record
Paralympic Games
Bronze medal – third place	1976 Örnsköldsvik	Slalom I
Silver medal – second place	1976 Örnsköldsvik	Giant Slalom I
Silver medal – second place	1976 Örnsköldsvik	Alpine Combination I
Bronze medal – third place	1980 Geilo	Giant Slalom 1A

Brigitte Rajchl is an Austrian para-alpine skier. She won medals representing Austria at the 1976 Winter Paralympics and at the 1980 Winter Paralympics. She also represented Austria at the 1984 Winter Paralympics and 1988 Winter Paralympics but did not win a medal at these games.

== Achievements ==
Year	Competition	Location	Position	Event	Time
1976	1976 Winter Paralympics	Örnsköldsvik, Sweden	3rd	Women's Slalom I	1:48.13
1976	1976 Winter Paralympics	Örnsköldsvik, Sweden	2nd	Women's Giant Slalom I	1:46.93
1976	1976 Winter Paralympics	Örnsköldsvik, Sweden	2nd	Women's Alpine Combination I	1:46.56
1980	1980 Winter Paralympics	Geilo, Norway	3rd	Women's Giant Slalom 1A	2:55.31

== See also ==
- List of Paralympic medalists in alpine skiing
