= United States at the 1976 Winter Paralympics =

- Flag of the United States
- IPC code: USA
- NPC: United States Paralympic Committee
- Website: www.teamusa.org/US-Paralympics
- Competitors: 1 in 2 sports and 4 events
- Medals: Gold 0 Silver 0 Bronze 0 Total 0

Winter Paralympics appearances (overview)
- 1976; 1980; 1984; 1988; 1992; 1994; 1998; 2002; 2006; 2010; 2014; 2018; 2022; 2026

The United States competed at the 1976 Winter Paralympics in Örnsköldsvik, Sweden. One competitor, Bill Hovanic, competed in four events in two sports. He did not win a medal.

== Alpine skiing ==
Bill Hovanic competed in the following events:

- Men's Alpine Combination II (finished in 5th place)
- Men's Giant Slalom II (finished in 6th place)
- Men's Slalom II (finished in 8th place)

== Cross-country ==
Bill Hovanic competed in the following event:

- Men's Short Distance 5 km II (finished in 13th place)

== See also ==
- United States at the Paralympics
- United States at the 1976 Winter Olympics
