= Herbert Millendorfer =

Austrian para-alpine skier

Sport
- Country: Austria
- Sport: Para-alpine skiing
Medal record
Paralympic Games
Bronze medal – third place	1976 Örnsköldsvik	Slalom II
Silver medal – second place	1976 Örnsköldsvik	Giant Slalom II
Gold medal – first place	1976 Örnsköldsvik	Alpine Combination II

Herbert Millendorfer is an Austrian para-alpine skier. He represented Austria at the 1976 Winter Paralympics and won one gold medal, one silver medal and one bronze medal.

== Achievements ==
Year	Competition	Location	Position	Event	Time
1976	1976 Winter Paralympics	Örnsköldsvik, Sweden	3rd	Slalom II	1:24.31
1976	1976 Winter Paralympics	Örnsköldsvik, Sweden	2nd	Giant Slalom II	2:47.94
1976	1976 Winter Paralympics	Örnsköldsvik, Sweden	1st	Alpine Combination II	0:22.29

== See also ==
- List of Paralympic medalists in alpine skiing
