= Austria at the 1980 Winter Paralympics =

- Flag of Austria
- IPC code: AUT
- NPC: Austrian Paralympic Committee

in Geilo, Norway
- Competitors: 34 (27 men and 7 women) in 2 sports
- Medals Ranked 3rd: Gold 6 Silver 10 Bronze 6 Total 22

Winter Paralympics appearances (overview)
- 1976; 1980; 1984; 1988; 1992; 1994; 1998; 2002; 2006; 2010; 2014; 2018; 2022; 2026

Austria competed at the 1980 Winter Paralympics in Geilo, Norway. 34 competitors from Austria won 22 medals including 6 gold, 10 silver and 6 bronze and finished 3rd in the medal table.

== Alpine skiing ==
The medalists are:

- (gold) Gerhard Langer, Men's Slalom 2B
- (gold) Brigitte Madlener, Women's Giant Slalom 3B
- (gold) Josef Meusburger, Men's Slalom 2A
- (gold) Peter Perner, Men's Giant Slalom 1A
- (gold) Peter Perner, Men's Slalom 1A
- (gold) Markus Ramsauer, Men's Giant Slalom 2A
- (silver) Anton Berger, Men's Slalom 2B
- (silver) Hubert Griessmaier, Men's Slalom 3A
- (silver) Heidi Jauk, Women's Slalom 2A
- (silver) Gerhard Langer, Men's Giant Slalom 2B
- (silver) Brigitte Madlener, Women's Slalom 3B
- (silver) Josef Meusburger, Men's Giant Slalom 2A
- (silver) Markus Ramsauer, Men's Slalom 2A
- (silver) Christine Winkler, Women's Giant Slalom 1A
- (silver) Christine Winkler, Women's Slalom 1A
- (bronze) Anton Berger, Men's Giant Slalom 2B
- (bronze) Anton Ledermaier, Men's Slalom 2B
- (bronze) Franz Meister, Men's Giant Slalom 1A
- (bronze) Brigitte Rajchl, Women's Giant Slalom 1A
- (bronze) Dietmar Schweninger, Men's Slalom 3A
- (bronze) Ursula Steiger, Women's Slalom 1A

== Cross-country ==
Seven athletes represented Austria in cross-country skiing. The medalists are:

- (silver) Bruno Geuze, Horst Morokutti, Franz Perner, Josef Scheiber Men's 4x5 km Relay 3A-3B

== See also ==
- Austria at the Paralympics
- Austria at the 1980 Winter Olympics
