= Hans Aalien =

Norwegian Paralympic athlete (born 1958)

Hans Anton Aalien
Personal information
- Born: 21 September 1958 (age 67) Elverum, Norway

Sport
- Country: Norway
- Sport: Athletics; Cross-country skiing Swimming

Achievements and titles
- Olympic finals: 1988 Winter: 1st
- Paralympic finals: 1980 Winter: 2 gold, 1 bronze 1984 Winter: 3 gold 1988 Winter: 2 gold, 1 silver
Medal record
Summer Paralympic Games
Representing Norway
Athletics
| Bronze medal – third place | 1980 Arnhem | 1,500 m A |
Swimming
| Silver medal – second place | Toronto 1976 | 100 m Breaststroke A |
| Bronze medal – third place | 1984 New York/ Stoke Mandeville | 100 m Breaststroke B1 |
Winter Paralympic Games
Representing Norway
Cross-country skiing
| Gold medal – first place | Geilo 1980 | 4x10 km Relay 5A-5B |
| Gold medal – first place | Geilo 1980 | Long Distance 20 km 5B |
| Gold medal – first place | 1984 Innsbruck | 4x10 km Relay B1-2 |
| Gold medal – first place | 1984 Innsbruck | Middle Distance 10 km B1 |
| Gold medal – first place | 1984 Innsbruck | Short Distance 10 km B1 |
| Gold medal – first place | 1988 Innsbruck | 4x10 km Relay B1-3 |
| Gold medal – first place | 1988 Innsbruck | Short Distance 15 km B1 |
| Silver medal – second place | 1988 Innsbruck | Long Distance 30 km B1 |
| Bronze medal – third place | Geilo 1980 | Middle Distance 10 km 5B |

Hans Anton Aalien (born 21 September 1958, Elverum, Norway) is a Norwegian Paralympic athlete from Eggedal, who competed as a blind competitor. He is one of the few athletes to have achieved success in both the Winter and Summer Paralympic Games, winning medals in cross-country skiing, swimming, and athletics. He is also known for winning a gold medal in the demonstration event for disabled skiing at the 1988 Winter Olympics event in Calgary, Alberta, Canada with a time of 18 minutes, 52.2 seconds.

== Career ==
Aalien was a dominant figure in blind cross-country skiing during the 1980s. He competed in three Winter Paralympics (1980, 1984, and 1988), winning a total of seven gold medals, one silver, and one bronze.

In addition to his winter sports career, Aalien competed in the Summer Paralympics as well. He won a silver and a bronze medal in swimming at the 1976 Summer Paralympics in Toronto and a bronze medal in athletics (800m B1) at the 1984 Summer Paralympics.

=== 1988 Winter Olympics ===
At the 1988 Winter Olympics in Calgary, disabled skiing was featured as a demonstration sport. Aalien won the gold medal in the men's 5 km cross-country skiing event for the blind. He finished with a time of 18 minutes and 51.2 seconds, guided by A. Homb.
