= Disabled skiing at the 1984 Winter Olympics =

Disabled skiing was an Olympic demonstration sport for the first time at the 1984 Winter Olympics. There was alpine giant slalom held for men only, with medals awarded in four different standing disability classes. As a demonstration sport, these medals did not contribute to the overall medal count. These races were held in addition to the alpine and cross-country events at the 1984 Winter Paralympics in Innsbruck. Disabled skiing would be demonstrated at the Olympics again in 1988. A total of 29 disabled skiers from 11 nations participated in the 1984 Games.

== Medal table ==
Rank	Nation	Gold	Silver	Bronze	Total
1	Austria	1	3	0	4
2	West Germany	1	1	0	2
3	Switzerland	1	0	1	2
4	Sweden	1	0	0	1
5	United States	0	0	2	2
6	Norway	0	0	1	1
Totals (6 entries)		4	4	4	12

== Men's giant slalom for single-leg amputees ==
Rank	Name	Time
1	Alexander Spitz (FRG)	1:08.05
2	Reiner Bergman (AUT)	1:09.91
3	David Jamison (USA)	1:10.18
4	Michael Hipp (FRG)	1:12.15
5	Peter Perner (AUT)	1:12.32
6	Patrick Knaff (FRA)	1:12.55
7	Chew Philip (CAN)	1:12.92
8	Greg Oswald (CAN)	1:13.81
9	Ola Rylander (SWE)	1:14.94
10	Rajko Strzinar (YUG)	1:18.69
11	Jordi Faurat Prat (ESP)	1:24.46

== Men's giant slalom for above-knee amputees ==
Rank	Name	Time
1	Markus Ramsauer (AUT)	1:02.66
2	Josef Meusburger (AUT)	1:04.90
3	Bill Latimer (USA)	1:05.41
4	Eugen Diethelm (SUI)	1:06.04
5	Paul Fournier (SUI)	1:07.10

== Men's giant slalom for single-arm amputees ==
Rank	Name	Time
1	Paul Neukomm (SUI)	1:02.19
2	Dietmar Schweninger (AUT)	1:03.04
3	Rolf Heinzmann (SUI)	1:03.25
4	Heinz Moser (SUI)	1:03.66
5	Reed Robinson (USA)	1:04.78
6	Sreco Kos (YUG)	1:05.32
7	Franc Komar (YUG)	1:08.40
8	Stefan Ahacic (YUG)	1:10.57

== Men's giant slalom for double-arm amputees ==
Rank	Name	Time
1	Lars Lundstroem (SWE)	1:05.09
2	Felix Abele (FRG)	1:05.91
3	Cato Zahl Pedersen (NOR)	1:06.21
4	Niko Mull (FRG)	1:06.44
5	Felix Gisler (SUI)	1:08.38
