= Switzerland at the 2010 Winter Paralympics =

- IPC code: SUI
- NPC: Swiss Paralympic Committee
- Website: www.swissparalympic.ch

in Vancouver
- Competitors: 15 in 4 sports
- Flag bearer: Thomas Pfyl
- Medals Ranked 13th: Gold 1 Silver 2 Bronze 0 Total 3

Winter Paralympics appearances (overview)
- 1976; 1980; 1984; 1988; 1992; 1994; 1998; 2002; 2006; 2010; 2014; 2018; 2022; 2026

Switzerland will send a delegation to compete at the 2010 Winter Paralympics in Vancouver, British Columbia, Canada. The country will field a total of fifteen athletes (ten men and five women) in four of the Games' five sports: alpine skiing, biathlon, cross-country skiing and wheelchair curling. This makes it a slightly smaller delegation than in 2006 (19 athletes) or 2002 (18). Switzerland's stated aim is to obtain two medals.

== Alpine skiing ==
Women

Athlete	Event	Final					
Athlete	Event	Run 1	Run 2	Run 3	Total Time	Calculated Time	Rank
Nadje Baumgartner							
Karin Fasel	Downhill standing						
Anita Fuhrer							

Men

Athlete	Event	Final					
Athlete	Event	Run 1	Run 2	Run 3	Total Time	Calculated Time	Rank
Michael Brugger	Downhill standing						
Michael Brugger	Slalom standing						
Micha Josi	Downhill standing						
Micha Josi	Slalom standing						
Christoph Kunz	Downhill sitting						
Christoph Kunz	Slalom sitting						
Thomas Pfyl	Downhill standing						
Thomas Pfyl	Slalom standing						
Hans Pleisch	Downhill sitting						
Hans Pleisch	Slalom sitting						

== Cross-country skiing ==
Switzerland will enter two competitors in cross-country skiing.

== See also ==
- Switzerland at the 2010 Winter Olympics
