= Switzerland at the 1992 Winter Paralympics =

- IPC code: SUI
- NPC: Swiss Paralympic Committee
- Website: www.swissparalympic.ch

in Tignes-Albertville
- Competitors: 19
- Medals Ranked 8th: Gold 3 Silver 8 Bronze 4 Total 15

Winter Paralympics appearances (overview)
- 1976; 1980; 1984; 1988; 1992; 1994; 1998; 2002; 2006; 2010; 2014; 2018; 2022; 2026

Switzerland competed at the 1992 Winter Paralympics in Tignes/Albertville, France. 19 competitors from Switzerland won 15 medals including 3 gold, 8 silver and 4 bronze and finished 8th in the medal table.

== See also ==
- Switzerland at the Paralympics
- Switzerland at the 1992 Winter Olympics
