= Willi Berger =

Austrian para-alpine skier

Sport
- Country: Austria
- Sport: Para-alpine skiing
Medal record
Paralympic Games
Bronze medal – third place	1976 Örnsköldsvik	Alpine Combination IV B
Bronze medal – third place	1976 Örnsköldsvik	Slalom IV B

Willi Berger is an Austrian para-alpine skier. He represented Austria in alpine skiing at the 1976 Winter Paralympics.

His win at the Alpine Combination IV B event formed part of a medal sweep as Horst Morokutti and Adolf Hagn, both representing Austria as well, won the gold and silver medals respectively.

== Achievements ==
Year	Competition	Location	Position	Event	Time
1976	1976 Winter Paralympics	Örnsköldsvik, Sweden	3rd	Alpine Combination IV B	1:43.05
1976	1976 Winter Paralympics	Örnsköldsvik, Sweden	3rd	Slalom IV B	1:52.30

== See also ==
- List of Paralympic medalists in alpine skiing
