= Manfred Brandl =

Austrian para-alpine skier

Sport
- Country: Austria
- Sport: Para-alpine skiing
Medal record
Paralympic Games
Silver medal – second place	1976 Örnsköldsvik	Alpine Combination III
Silver medal – second place	1976 Örnsköldsvik	Giant Slalom III
Silver medal – second place	1976 Örnsköldsvik	Slalom III

Manfred Brandl is an Austrian para-alpine skier. He represented Austria at the 1976 Winter Paralympics and he won three silver medals in alpine skiing.

== Achievements ==
Year	Competition	Location	Position	Event	Time
1976	1976 Winter Paralympics	Örnsköldsvik, Sweden	2nd	Men's Alpine Combination III	0:32.76
1976	1976 Winter Paralympics	Örnsköldsvik, Sweden	2nd	Men's Giant Slalom III	2:37.85
1976	1976 Winter Paralympics	Örnsköldsvik, Sweden	2nd	Men's Slalom III	1:18.94

== See also ==
- List of Paralympic medalists in alpine skiing
