= Horst Morokutti =

Austrian para-alpine skier

Sport
- Country: Austria
- Sport: Para-alpine skiing; Paralympic cross-country skiing
Medal record
Paralympic Games
Gold medal – first place	1976 Örnsköldsvik	Alpine Combination IV B
Silver medal – second place	1976 Örnsköldsvik	Giant Slalom IV B
Silver medal – second place	1976 Örnsköldsvik	Slalom IV B
Silver medal – second place	1980 Innsbruck	4x5 km Relay 3A-3B
Silver medal – second place	1984 Innsbruck	Middle Distance 10 km LW5/7
Bronze medal – third place	1984 Innsbruck	Short Distance 5 km LW5/7

Horst Morokutti is an Austrian para-alpine skier and cross-country skier. He represented Austria at four Winter Paralympics and, in total, he won one gold medal, four silver medals and one bronze medal.

== Career ==
He represented Austria in alpine skiing at the 1976 Winter Paralympics and at the 1980 Winter Paralympics. He also represented Austria in cross-country skiing at the 1980 Winter Paralympics, at the 1984 Winter Paralympics and at the 1988 Winter Paralympics.

His win at the 1976 Alpine Combination IV B event formed part of a medal sweep as he won the gold medal and Adolf Hagn and Willi Berger, both representing Austria as well, won the silver and bronze medal respectively. He won a medal at every event that he competed in at the 1976 Winter Paralympics. He also won medals at the 1980 Winter Paralympics and the 1984 Winter Paralympics but not at the 1988 Winter Paralympics.

== Achievements ==
Year	Competition	Location	Position	Event	Time
1976	1976 Winter Paralympics	Örnsköldsvik, Sweden	1st	Men's Alpine Combination IV B	0:30.00
1976	1976 Winter Paralympics	Örnsköldsvik, Sweden	2nd	Men's Giant Slalom IV B	3:21.67
1976	1976 Winter Paralympics	Örnsköldsvik, Sweden	2nd	Men's Slalom IV B	1:46.33
1980	1980 Winter Paralympics	Innsbruck, Austria	2nd	Men's 4x5 km Relay 3A-3B	1:28:50.0
1984	1984 Winter Paralympics	Innsbruck, Austria	2nd	Men's Middle Distance 10 km LW5/7	0:42:09.1
1984	1984 Winter Paralympics	Innsbruck, Austria	3rd	Men's Short Distance 5 km LW5/7	21:28.9

== See also ==
- List of Paralympic medalists in alpine skiing
