= Switzerland at the 1994 Winter Paralympics =

- IPC code: SUI
- NPC: Swiss Paralympic Committee
- Website: www.swissparalympic.ch

in Lillehammer
- Competitors: 19
- Medals Ranked 11th: Gold 2 Silver 9 Bronze 5 Total 16

Winter Paralympics appearances (overview)
- 1976; 1980; 1984; 1988; 1992; 1994; 1998; 2002; 2006; 2010; 2014; 2018; 2022; 2026

Switzerland competed at the 1994 Winter Paralympics in Lillehammer, Norway. 19 competitors from Switzerland won 16 medals including 2 gold, 9 silver and 5 bronze and finished 11th in the medal table.

== See also ==
- Switzerland at the Paralympics
- Switzerland at the 1994 Winter Olympics
