= Switzerland at the 1998 Winter Paralympics =

- IPC code: SUI
- NPC: Swiss Paralympic Committee
- Website: www.swissparalympic.ch

in Nagano
- Competitors: 19
- Medals Ranked 6th: Gold 10 Silver 5 Bronze 8 Total 23

Winter Paralympics appearances (overview)
- 1976; 1980; 1984; 1988; 1992; 1994; 1998; 2002; 2006; 2010; 2014; 2018; 2022; 2026

Switzerland competed at the 1998 Winter Paralympics in Nagano, Japan. 19 competitors from Switzerland won 23 medals including 10 gold, 5 silver and 8 bronze and finished 6th in the medal table.

== See also ==
- Switzerland at the Paralympics
- Switzerland at the 1998 Winter Olympics
