= 1980 Paralympics =

1980 Paralympics may refer to:

- 1980 Summer Paralympics
- 1980 Winter Paralympics
