= Switzerland at the 2022 Winter Paralympics =

- Flag of Switzerland
- IPC code: SUI
- NPC: Swiss Paralympic Committee
- Website: www.swissparalympic.ch

in Beijing, China 4 March 2022 – 13 March 2022
- Competitors: 12 (9 men and 3 women) in 4 sports
- Flag bearers: Hans Burgener; Romy Tschopp
- Medals Ranked 17th: Gold 0 Silver 0 Bronze 1 Total 1

Winter Paralympics appearances (overview)
- 1976; 1980; 1984; 1988; 1992; 1994; 1998; 2002; 2006; 2010; 2014; 2018; 2022; 2026

Switzerland competed at the 2022 Winter Paralympics in Beijing, China which took place between 4–13 March 2022. In total, 12 athletes competed in four sports.

== Medalists ==
The following Swiss competitors won medals at the games. In the discipline sections below, the medalists' names are bolded.

Medals by sport
**Sport**	1st place, gold medalist(s)	2nd place, silver medalist(s)	3rd place, bronze medalist(s)	**Total**
Alpine skiing	0	0	1	**1**
Total	0	0	1	1

Medals by gender
**Gender**	1st place, gold medalist(s)	2nd place, silver medalist(s)	3rd place, bronze medalist(s)	**Total**
Male	0	0	1	**1**
Female	0	0	0	**0**
Mixed	0	0	0	**0**
Total	0	0	1	1

Medal	Name	Sport	Event	Date
Bronze	Théo Gmür	Alpine skiing	Men's downhill, standing	5 March

== Competitors ==
The following is the list of number of competitors participating at the Games per sport/discipline.

Sport	Men	Women	Total
Alpine skiing	5	0	5
Cross-country skiing	1	0	1
Snowboarding	0	1	1
Wheelchair curling	3	2	5
Total	9	3	12

== Alpine skiing ==
Théo Gmür was among the alpine skiers to represent Switzerland at the 2022 Winter Paralympics.

Men

Athlete	Event	Run 1		Run 2		Total	
Athlete	Event	Time	Rank	Time	Rank	Time	Rank
Robin Cuche	Downhill, standing	—N/a				1:19.55	11
Robin Cuche	Giant slalom, standing	DNF					
Robin Cuche	Super-G, standing	—N/a				1:12.92	6
Robin Cuche	Slalom, standing	45.14	8	DNF			
Robin Cuche	Super combined, standing	1:13.14	4	43.53	12	1:56.67	8
**Théo Gmür**	Downhill, standing	—N/a				1:16.17	3rd place, bronze medalist(s)
**Théo Gmür**	Giant slalom, standing	58.36	3	58.56	7	1:56.92	5
**Théo Gmür**	Super-G, standing	—N/a				1:11.31	5
**Théo Gmür**	Super combined, standing	1:12.05	2	DSQ			
Thomas Pfyl	Giant slalom, standing	DNS					
Thomas Pfyl	Super-G, standing	—N/a				1:12.97	7
Thomas Pfyl	Slalom, standing	44.61	6	52.08	5	1:36.69	4
Thomas Pfyl	Super combined, standing	1:13.70	6	DNF			
Pascal Christen	Downhill, sitting	—N/a				DNF	
Pascal Christen	Giant slalom, sitting	1:07.82	21	1:04.56	15	2:12.38	17
Pascal Christen	Slalom, sitting	54.83	17	1:01.99	13	1:56.82	14
Pascal Christen	Super combined, sitting	1:15.05	7	DNF			
Pascal Christen	Super-G, sitting	—N/a				DNF	
Murat Pelit	Downhill, sitting	—N/a				DNS	
Murat Pelit	Giant slalom, sitting	DNF					
Murat Pelit	Slalom, sitting	DNF					
Murat Pelit	Super combined, sitting	1:19.30	17	DNF			
Murat Pelit	Super-G, sitting	—N/a				1:18.54	16

== Cross-country skiing ==
Luca Tavasci competed at the 2022 Winter Paralympics.

Men

Athlete	Event	Qualification		Semifinal		Final	
Athlete	Event	Result	Rank	Result	Rank	Result	Rank
Luca Tavasci	12.5 km free, standing	—N/a				40:28.5	13
Luca Tavasci	20 km classic, standing	—N/a				1:01:10.0	11
Luca Tavasci	1.5 km sprint, sitting	3:00.73	16	Did not advance			

== Snowboarding ==
One snowboarder, Romy Tschopp, represented Switzerland.

Banked slalom

Athlete	Event	Run 1	Run 2	Best	Rank
Romy Tschopp	Women's SB-LL2	1:25.08	1:24.77	1:24.77	12

Snowboard cross

Athlete	Event	Qualification			Quarterfinal	Semifinal	Final
Athlete	Event	Run 1	Run 2	Rank	Position	Position	Position
Romy Tschopp	Women's SB-LL2	**1:18.14**	1:27.72	9 **Q**	3	Did not advance	

Qualification legend: Q - Qualify to next round; FA - Qualify to medal final; FB - Qualify to consolation final

== Wheelchair curling ==
Switzerland competed in wheelchair curling.

Summary

Team	Event	Group stage											Semifinal	Final / BM	
Team	Event	Opposition Score	Opposition Score	Opposition Score	Opposition Score	Opposition Score	Opposition Score	Opposition Score	Opposition Score	Opposition Score	Opposition Score	Rank	Opposition Score	Opposition Score	Rank
Laurent Kneubühl; Hans Burgener; Françoise Jaquerod; Cynthia Mathez; Patrick Delacrétaz	Mixed	SWE; **L** 2–9	CAN; **L** 4–8	KOR; **W** 8–7	GBR; **L** 1–15	CHN; **L** 4–7	LAT; **L** 7–9	NOR; **L** 5–8	USA; **L** 8–5	SVK; **L** 8–6	EST; **L** 6–8	11	Did not advance		

Round robin Final round-robin standings

Key
Teams to Playoffs

Country	Skip	W	L	W–L	PF	PA	EW	EL	BE	SE	S%	DSC
China	Wang Haitao	8	2	–	68	39	36	28	2	13	71%	122.32
Slovakia	Radoslav Ďuriš	7	3	2–0	65	57	40	33	1	16	65%	95.19
Sweden	Viljo Petersson-Dahl	7	3	1–1	66	52	37	35	3	18	68%	91.08
Canada	Mark Ideson	7	3	0–2	69	50	36	33	2	11	71%	95.29
United States	Matthew Thums	5	5	1–0	60	75	32	39	2	6	60%	70.98
South Korea	Go Seung-nam	5	5	0–1	64	59	35	37	0	11	64%	103.20
Norway	Jostein Stordahl	4	6	2–0	60	64	37	38	2	13	64%	107.82
Great Britain	Hugh Nibloe	4	6	1–1	67	56	37	36	0	16	62%	134.75
Latvia	Poļina Rožkova	4	6	0–2	61	71	40	32	0	18	63%	100.43
Estonia	Andrei Koitmäe	3	7	–	51	69	32	41	2	13	61%	106.21
Switzerland	Laurent Kneubühl	1	9	–	48	87	32	42	0	8	56%	109.27

Wheelchair curling round robin summary table
Pos.	Country	Canada	China	Estonia	Great Britain	Japan	Norway	Slovakia	South Korea	Sweden	Switzerland	United States	Record
4	Canada	—N/a	7–3	9–3	6–3	10–3	7–6	8–9	4–9	3–6	8–4	7–4	7–3
1	China	3–7	—	9–3	6–3	9–2	7–4	7–5	9–4	1–5	7–4	10–2	8–2
10	Estonia	3–9	3–9	—	5–10	6–5	8–3	6–7	2–5	4–6	8–6	6–9	3–7
8	Great Britain	3–6	3–6	10–5	—	8–4	5–7	3–7	6–8	4–6	15–1	10–6	4–6
9	Latvia	3–10	2–9	5–6	4–8	—	6–8	8–4	8–4	9–7	9–7	7–8	4–6
7	Norway	6–7	4–7	3–8	7–5	8–6	—	9–3	4–9	6–8	8–5	5–6	4–6
2	Slovakia	9–8	5–7	7–6	7–3	4–8	3–9	—	7–2	6–5	8–6	9–3	7–3
6	South Korea	9–4	4–9	5–2	8–6	4–8	9–4	2–7	—	10–4	7–8	6–7	5–5
3	Sweden	6–3	5–1	6–4	6–4	7–9	8–6	5–6	4–10	—	9–2	10–7	7–3
11	Switzerland	4–8	4–7	6–8	1–15	7–9	5–8	6–8	8–7	2–9	—	5–8	1–9
5	United States	4–7	2–10	9–6	6–10	8–7	6–5	3–9	7–6	7–10	8–5	—	5–5

**Draw 1**
Saturday, March 5, 14:35

**Sheet A**	**1**	**2**	**3**	**4**	**5**	**6**	**7**	**8**	**Final**
Switzerland (Kneubühl) 🔨	0	0	0	1	0	0	1	X	**2**
**Sweden (Petersson-Dahl)**	2	2	1	0	3	1	0	X	**9**

**Draw 2**
Saturday, March 5, 19:35

**Sheet D**	**1**	**2**	**3**	**4**	**5**	**6**	**7**	**8**	**Final**
**Canada (Ideson) 🔨**	0	3	0	0	3	0	2	X	**8**
Switzerland (Kneubühl)	0	0	1	1	0	2	0	X	**4**

**Draw 4**
Sunday, March 6, 14:35

**Sheet B**	**1**	**2**	**3**	**4**	**5**	**6**	**7**	**8**	**EE**	**Final**
**Switzerland (Kneubühl) 🔨**	1	0	1	0	3	0	0	2	1	**8**
South Korea (Go)	0	4	0	1	0	1	1	0	0	**7**

**Draw 6**
Monday, March 7, 9:35

**Sheet C**	**1**	**2**	**3**	**4**	**5**	**6**	**7**	**8**	**Final**
Switzerland (Kneubühl)	0	0	0	0	1	0	X	X	**1**
**Great Britain (Nibloe) 🔨**	4	1	5	1	0	4	X	X	**15**

**Draw 8**
Monday, March 7, 19:35

**Sheet A**	**1**	**2**	**3**	**4**	**5**	**6**	**7**	**8**	**Final**
**China (Wang)**	1	0	1	0	3	0	0	2	**7**
Switzerland (Kneubühl) 🔨	0	1	0	2	0	1	0	0	**4**

**Draw 9**
Tuesday, March 8, 9:35

**Sheet B**	**1**	**2**	**3**	**4**	**5**	**6**	**7**	**8**	**Final**
Switzerland (Kneubühl)	0	1	0	0	3	3	0	0	**7**
**Latvia (Rožkova) 🔨**	3	0	2	1	0	0	2	2	**9**

**Draw 11**
Tuesday, March 8, 19:35

**Sheet D**	**1**	**2**	**3**	**4**	**5**	**6**	**7**	**8**	**Final**
**Norway (Syversen)**	0	2	0	2	2	1	0	1	**8**
Switzerland (Kneubühl) 🔨	2	0	2	0	0	0	1	0	**5**

**Draw 13**
Wednesday, March 9, 14:35

**Sheet B**	**1**	**2**	**3**	**4**	**5**	**6**	**7**	**8**	**Final**
**United States (Thums) 🔨**	1	3	0	0	1	0	0	3	**8**
Switzerland (Kneubühl)	0	0	2	1	0	1	1	0	**5**

**Draw 15**
Thursday, March 10, 9:35

**Sheet C**	**1**	**2**	**3**	**4**	**5**	**6**	**7**	**8**	**Final**
**Slovakia (Ďuriš)**	0	1	0	0	2	0	5	X	**8**
Switzerland (Kneubühl) 🔨	2	0	1	1	0	2	0	X	**6**

**Draw 16**
Thursday, March 10, 14:35

**Sheet A**	**1**	**2**	**3**	**4**	**5**	**6**	**7**	**8**	**Final**
Switzerland (Kneubühl)	1	0	2	0	0	0	2	1	**6**
**Estonia (Koitmäe) 🔨**	0	1	0	2	2	3	0	0	**8**

== See also ==
- Switzerland at the Paralympics
- Switzerland at the 2022 Winter Olympics
