= Doug Keil =

American para-alpine skier

Sport
- Country: United States
- Sport: Alpine skiing
Medal record
Paralympic Games
Gold medal – first place	1980 Geilo	Giant Slalom 4
Gold medal – first place	1980 Geilo	Slalom 4

Doug Keil is an American para-alpine skier. He represented the United States at the 1980 Winter Paralympics and he won two gold medals: one in the Men's Giant Slalom 4 event and one in the Men's Slalom 4 event. In both events he was the only competitor. Both his left arm and leg were amputated after being electrocuted at age 14.

== Achievements ==
Year	Competition	Location	Position	Event	Time
1980	1980 Winter Paralympics	Geilo, Norway	1st	Men's Giant Slalom 4	4:16.06
1980	1980 Winter Paralympics	Geilo, Norway	1st	Men's Slalom 4	2:39.54

== See also ==
- List of Paralympic medalists in alpine skiing
