= 1976 Paralympics =

1976 Paralympics refers to both:

- 1976 Summer Paralympics
- 1976 Winter Paralympics
