= Adolf Hagn =

Austrian para-alpine skier

Sport
- Country: Austria
- Sport: Para-alpine skiing
Medal record
Paralympic Games
Gold medal – first place	1976 Örnsköldsvik	Giant Slalom IV B
Silver medal – second place	1976 Örnsköldsvik	Alpine Combination IV B

Adolf Hagn is an Austrian para-alpine skier. He represented Austria in alpine skiing at the 1976 Winter Paralympics.

== Career ==
He won the gold medal at the Men's Giant Slalom IV B event at the 1976 Winter Paralympics. He also won the silver medal at the Men's Alpine Combination IV B event. His win at the Alpine Combination IV B event formed part of a medal sweep as Horst Morokutti and Willi Berger, both representing Austria as well, won the gold and bronze medals respectively.

== Achievements ==
Year	Competition	Location	Position	Event	Time
1976	1976 Winter Paralympics	Örnsköldsvik, Sweden	1st	Giant Slalom IV B	3:14.08
1976	1976 Winter Paralympics	Örnsköldsvik, Sweden	2nd	Alpine Combination IV B	0:33.49

== See also ==
- List of Paralympic medalists in alpine skiing
