= Uganda at the 1976 Winter Paralympics =

- IPC code: UGA
- NPC: Uganda National Paralympic Committee

in Örnsköldsvik
- Competitors: 1 in 1 sport
- Medals Ranked 10 (joint last)th: Gold 0 Silver 0 Bronze 0 Total 0

Winter Paralympics appearances (overview)
- 1976; 1980; 1984–2026

The Winter Paralympics are a major international multi-sport event held every four years for athletes with physical disabilities to compete in various snow and ice sports. Uganda competed at the inaugural Winter Paralympic Games in 1976 in Örnsköldsvik, Sweden.

== Background ==
Uganda was the only African country to take part in the 1976 Games, and thus the first African country ever to compete at the Winter Paralympics. Uganda was also the only country to compete at the 1976 Winter Paralympics but not at the 1976 Winter Olympics.

== Team ==
Uganda entered only one athlete, Tofiri Kibuuka, who competed in cross-country skiing. He did not win any medals. Kibuuka would later change nationalities, and go on to represent Norway at the Summer Paralympics at the 1984, 1988 and 1992 Games.

== Cross-country skiing ==
Uganda's sole representative, Tofiri Kibuuka, competed in two events.

- In the Men's short distance 10 km (category A), he finished 16th (out of 28), with a time of 58:24.
- In the Men's middle distance 15 km (category A), he finished 10th (out of 25), with a time of 1:16:32.

== Ugandan participation details ==
- Competitor: Tofiri Kibuuka
- Sport: Cross-country skiing
- Medals: Uganda did not win any medals at the 1976 Games.
- Significance: Kibuuka was the sole representative for Uganda, and as the only African participant, his entry was a historic moment for the Winter Paralympics.

== See also ==
- Uganda at the Paralympics
