= Walter Laurer =

Austrian para-alpine skier

Sport
- Country: Austria
- Sport: Para-alpine skiing
Medal record
Paralympic Games
Bronze medal – third place	1976 Örnsköldsvik	Alpine Combination I

Walter Laurer is an Austrian para-alpine skier.

He represented Austria at the 1976 Winter Paralympics and he won the bronze medal at the Alpine Combination I event.

He also competed in the Slalom I and Giant Slalom I events but did not win a medal; he finished 6th and 4th respectively.

== See also ==
- List of Paralympic medalists in alpine skiing
