= Richard Prager (skier) =

West German para-alpine skier

Sport
- Country: Germany
- Sport: Para-alpine skiing
Medal record
Paralympic Games
Silver medal – second place	1976 Örnsköldsvik	Slalom IV A
Silver medal – second place	1976 Örnsköldsvik	Alpine Combination IV A

Richard Prager is a West German para-alpine skier. He represented West Germany at alpine skiing at the 1976 Winter Paralympics

He won the silver medal at the Men's Slalom IV A event at the 1976 Winter Paralympics. He also won the silver medal at the Men's Alpine Combination IV A event.

== See also ==
- List of Paralympic medalists in alpine skiing
