= Franz Meister =

Austrian para-alpine skier

Sport
- Country: Austria
- Sport: Para-alpine skiing
Medal record
Men's Alpine skiing
Paralympic Games
Gold medal – first place	1976 Örnsköldsvik	Slalom I
Bronze medal – third place	1976 Örnsköldsvik	Giant Slalom I
Silver medal – second place	1976 Örnsköldsvik	Alpine Combination I
Bronze medal – third place	1980 Geilo	Giant Slalom 1A

Franz Meister is an Austrian para-alpine skier. He won one gold, one silver and two bronze medals at the 1976 and 1980 Winter Paralympics.

== Career ==
Meister competed in three events at the 1976 Winter Paralympics and two events at the 1980 Winter Paralympics.

== Achievements ==
Year	Competition	Location	Position	Event	Time
1976	1976 Winter Paralympics	Örnsköldsvik, Sweden	1st	Men's Slalom I	1:28.55
1976	1976 Winter Paralympics	Örnsköldsvik, Sweden	3rd	Giant Slalom I	3:08.57
1976	1976 Winter Paralympics	Örnsköldsvik, Sweden	2nd	Alpine Combination I	0:41.00
1980	1980 Winter Paralympics	Geilo, Norway	4th	Slalom 1A	1:44.76
1980	1980 Winter Paralympics	Geilo, Norway	3rd	Giant Slalom 1A	2:33.06

== See also ==
- List of Paralympic medalists in alpine skiing
