= Switzerland at the 1980 Winter Paralympics =

- Flag of Switzerland
- IPC code: SUI
- NPC: Swiss Paralympic Committee
- Website: www.swissparalympic.ch
- Competitors: 27 (20 men and 7 women) in 2 sports
- Medals Ranked 5th: Gold 4 Silver 2 Bronze 4 Total 10

Winter Paralympics appearances (overview)
- 1976; 1980; 1984; 1988; 1992; 1994; 1998; 2002; 2006; 2010; 2014; 2018; 2022; 2026

Switzerland competed at the 1980 Winter Paralympics in Geilo, Norway. 27 competitors from Switzerland won 10 medals including 4 gold, 2 silver and 4 bronze and finished 5th in the medal table. All medals but one were won in alpine skiing.

== Alpine skiing ==
The medalists are:

- (gold) Rolf Heinzmann Men's Giant Slalom 3A
- (gold) Rolf Heinzmann Men's Slalom 3A
- (gold) Elizabeth Osterwalder Women's Giant Slalom 2B
- (gold) Elizabeth Osterwalder Women's Slalom 2B
- (silver) Felix Gisler Men's Giant Slalom 3B
- (silver) Heinz Moser Men's Giant Slalom 3A
- (bronze) Eugen Diethelm Men's Giant Slalom 2A
- (bronze) Franciane Fischer Women's Giant Slalom 3A
- (bronze) Franciane Fischer Women's Slalom 3A

== Cross-country ==
Twelve athletes represented Switzerland at cross-country skiing. They won a bronze medal in the Men's 4x5 km Relay 1A+2A, however the athletes are unknown.

- (bronze) Men's 4x5 km Relay 1A+2A

== See also ==
- Switzerland at the Paralympics
- Switzerland at the 1980 Winter Olympics
