= Franz Perner =

Austrian Paralympic athlete

Sport
- Country: Austria
- Sport: Para-alpine skiing
Medal record
Paralympic Games
| Bronze medal – third place | 1976 Örnsköldsvik | Alpine Combination III |
| Bronze medal – third place | 1976 Örnsköldsvik | Giant Slalom III |
| Bronze medal – third place | 1976 Örnsköldsvik | Slalom III |
| Silver medal – second place | 1980 Geilo | 4x5 km Relay 3A-3B |

Franz Perner is an Austrian Paralympic athlete. He competed in alpine skiing at the 1976 Winter Paralympics and in cross-country skiing at the 1980 Winter Paralympics, at the 1984 Winter Paralympics and at the 1988 Winter Paralympics. He also competed at one event in biathlon at the 1988 Winter Paralympics.

== Achievements ==
| Year | Competition | Location | Position | Event | Time |
|---|---|---|---|---|---|
| 1976 | 1976 Winter Paralympics | Örnsköldsvik, Sweden | 3rd | Men's Alpine Combination III | 1:26.17 |
| 1976 | 1976 Winter Paralympics | Örnsköldsvik, Sweden | 3rd | Men's Giant Slalom III | 2:44.45 |
| 1976 | 1976 Winter Paralympics | Örnsköldsvik, Sweden | 3rd | Men's Slalom III | 1:23.47 |
| 1980 | 1980 Winter Paralympics | Geilo, Norway | 2nd | Men's 4x5 km Relay 3A-3B | 1:28:50.0 |

== See also ==
- List of Paralympic medalists in alpine skiing
