= Switzerland at the 1988 Winter Paralympics =

- Flag of Switzerland
- IPC code: SUI
- NPC: Swiss Paralympic Committee
- Website: www.swissparalympic.ch
- Competitors: 32 (28 men and 4 women) in 3 sports
- Medals Ranked 5th: Gold 8 Silver 7 Bronze 8 Total 23

Winter Paralympics appearances (overview)
- 1976; 1980; 1984; 1988; 1992; 1994; 1998; 2002; 2006; 2010; 2014; 2018; 2022; 2026

Switzerland competed at the 1988 Winter Paralympics in Innsbruck, Austria. 32 competitors from Switzerland won 23 medals including 8 gold, 7 silver and 8 bronze and finished 5th in the medal table.

== Alpine skiing ==
The medalists are:

- (gold) Fritz Berger Men's Downhill LW2
- (gold) Paul Fournier Men's Downhill LW4
- (gold) Paul Fournier Men's Slalom LW4
- (gold) Francoise Jacquerod Women's Giant Slalom LW10
- (gold) Francoise Jacquerod Women's Slalom LW10
- (silver) Jacques Blanc Men's Giant Slalom LW10
- (silver) Jacques Blanc Men's Slalom LW10
- (silver) Hans Burn Men's Downhill LW4
- (silver) Paul Neukomm Men's Downhill LW6/8
- (bronze) Beatrice Berthet Women's Giant Slalom LW4
- (bronze) Beatrice Berthet Women's Slalom LW4
- (bronze) Hans Burn Men's Giant Slalom LW4
- (bronze) Hermann Kollau Men's Giant Slalom LW10
- (bronze) Paul Neukomm Men's Giant Slalom LW6/8

== Biathlon ==
The medalists are:

- (silver) Christoph Andres Men's 7.5 km LW2

== Cross-country ==
The medalists are:

- (gold) Christoph Andres Men's Long Distance 10 km LW2
- (gold) Christoph Andres Men's Short Distance 5 km LW2
- (gold) Heinz Frei Men's Short Distance 5 km grade I
- (silver) Walter Baertschi, Heinz Frei, Walter Widmer Men's 3x2.5 km Relay grade I-II
- (silver) Walter Widmer Men's Long Distance 10 km grade II
- (bronze) Heinz Frei Men's Long Distance 10 km grade I
- (bronze) Monika Waelti Women's Long Distance 10 km LW3/4/9
- (bronze) Monika Waelti Women's Short Distance 5 km LW3/4/9

== See also ==
- Switzerland at the Paralympics
- Switzerland at the 1988 Winter Olympics
