= Cato Zahl Pedersen =

Norwegian para-alpine skier (born 1959)

Personal information
- Born: 12 January 1959 (age 67) Drøbak, Frogn Municipality, Norway

Sport
- Sport: Para alpine skiing Paralympic athletics Para cross-country skiing
Medal record
Representing Norway
Winter Paralympics
Para alpine skiing
Gold medal – first place	1980 Geilo	Slalom 3B
Gold medal – first place	1980 Geilo	Giant slalom 3B
Gold medal – first place	1988 Innsbruck	Downhill LW5/7
Gold medal – first place	1988 Innsbruck	Giant slalom LW5/7
Gold medal – first place	1994 Lillehammer	Slalom LW5/7
Gold medal – first place	1994 Lillehammer	Super-G LW5/7
Silver medal – second place	1994 Lillehammer	Downhill LW5/7
Para cross-country skiing
Gold medal – first place	1980 Geilo	10km 3B
Summer Paralympics
Gold medal – first place	1980 Arnhem	100m E1
Gold medal – first place	1980 Arnhem	400m E1
Gold medal – first place	1980 Arnhem	1500m E1
Gold medal – first place	1980 Arnhem	Long jump E1
Gold medal – first place	1984 Stoke Mandeville / New York	1500m A5
Gold medal – first place	1984 Stoke Mandeville / New York	5000m A5

Cato Zahl Pedersen (born 12 January 1959) is a Norwegian skier and multiple Paralympic gold medal winner. He has won a total of fourteen medals (thirteen gold, one silver) at the Paralympic Games, in both Winter and Summer Paralympics. He has no arms, having lost both in a childhood high voltage accident.

He competed in track and field athletics at the 1980 and 1984 Summer Paralympics, winning six gold medals. He took part in the Summer Games again in 2000, this time in sailing, but did not medal. At the Winter Paralympics, he competed in alpine skiing four times, in 1980, 1984, 1988 and 1994. At the 1980 and 1984 Winter Games he also took part in cross-country skiing, winning one gold in 1980.

Pedersen took the athletes' oath on behalf of all competitors at the 1994 Winter Paralympics in Lillehammer.

In 1994/1995, Pedersen took part in a successful four-person Norwegian skiing expedition to the South Pole. He dragged his 200-pound sledge the whole distance, using the prosthetic hook on his right hand to hold a single ski pole. He has also climbed Cho Oyu, the 7th highest mountain in the world, in 2005, and almost reached the top of Mount Everest in 2007.
