= Annemie Schneider =

German paralympic athlete

Personal information
- Nationality: German
- Born: Germany

Sport
- Country: West Germany
- Sport: Paralympic alpine skiing
- Events: Downhill; Giant slalom slalom
Medal record
Paralympic Games
Gold medal – first place	1976 Örnsköldsvik	Alpine combination
Gold medal – first place	1976 Örnsköldsvik	Giant slalom
Gold medal – first place	1976 Örnsköldsvik	Slalom
Gold medal – first place	1980 Geilo	Giant slalom
Gold medal – first place	1980 Geilo	Slalom
Silver medal – second place	1988 Innsbruck	Giant slalom
Bronze medal – third place	1988 Innsbruck	Downhill
Bronze medal – third place	1994 Lillehammer	Giant slalom

Annemie Schneider is a former German paralympic athlete, that won 8 medals (5 gold) at the Winter Paralympics.

During 2006 Winter Paralympics were inducted into Paralympic Hall of Fame.

== Biography ==
Her category was LW2 (above-the-knee amputation).

== See also ==
- West Germany at the 1976 Winter Paralympics
