= Ulli Helmbold =

West German para-alpine skier

Sport
- Country: Germany
- Sport: Para-alpine skiing
Medal record
Paralympic Games
Gold medal – first place	1976 Örnsköldsvik	Giant Slalom I

Ulli Helmbold is a West German para-alpine skier. He represented West Germany at alpine skiing at the 1976 Winter Paralympics and at alpine skiing at the 1980 Winter Paralympics.

He won the gold medal at the Men's Giant Slalom I event at the 1976 Winter Paralympics.

== Career ==
He competed at three events at the 1976 Winter Paralympics and at two events at the 1980 Winter Paralympics:

- 1976 Winter Paralympics
  - Men's Alpine Combination I
  - Men's Giant Slalom I
  - Men's Slalom I
- 1980 Winter Paralympics
  - Men's Giant Slalom 1A
  - Men's Slalom 1A

== See also ==
- List of Paralympic medalists in alpine skiing
