= Hubert Griessmaier =

Austrian para-alpine skier

Sport
- Country: Austria
- Sport: Para-alpine skiing
Medal record
Paralympic Games
Silver medal – second place	1980 Geilo	Slalom 3A

Hubert Griessmaier is an Austrian para-alpine skier. He represented Austria at the 1980 Winter Paralympics and at the 1988 Winter Paralympics.

He won the silver medal at the Men's Slalom 3A event at the 1980 Winter Paralympics.

== See also ==
- List of Paralympic medalists in alpine skiing
