= Josef Meusburger =

Austrian para-alpine skier

Sport
- Country: Austria
- Sport: Para-alpine skiing
Medal record
Paralympic Games
Gold medal – first place	1976 Örnsköldsvik	Slalom II
Gold medal – first place	1980 Geilo	Slalom 2A
Silver medal – second place	1980 Geilo	Giant Slalom 2A
Gold medal – first place	1984 Innsbruck	Slalom LW4
Gold medal – first place	1984 Innsbruck	Giant Slalom LW4
Silver medal – second place	1984 Innsbruck	Downhill LW4
Gold medal – first place	1984 Innsbruck	Alpine Combination LW4
Gold medal – first place	1988 Innsbruck	Giant Slalom LW4

Josef Meusburger is an Austrian para-alpine skier.

== Career ==
Meusburger represented Austria at the 1976, 1980, 1984 and 1988 Winter Paralympics. He won a medal in each event that he competed in at the 1976, 1980 and 1984 Winter Paralympics. At the 1988 Winter Paralympics, he won one gold medal. In total, he won six gold medals and two silver medals at the Winter Paralympics.

He also competed at the Men's giant slalom for above-knee amputees event at disabled skiing, a demonstration sport during the 1984 Winter Olympics.

== Achievements ==
Year	Competition	Location	Position	Event	Time
1976	1976 Winter Paralympics	Örnsköldsvik, Sweden	1st	Slalom II	1:21.04
1980	1980 Winter Paralympics	Geilo, Norway	1st	Slalom 2A	1:34.14
1980	1980 Winter Paralympics	Geilo, Norway	2nd	Giant Slalom 2A	2:17.51
1984	1984 Winter Paralympics	Innsbruck, Austria	1st	Slalom LW4	1:07.48
1984	1984 Winter Paralympics	Innsbruck, Austria	1st	Giant Slalom LW4	1:21.20
1984	1984 Winter Paralympics	Innsbruck, Austria	2nd	Downhill LW4	1:04.04
1984	1984 Winter Paralympics	Innsbruck, Austria	1st	Alpine Combination LW4	0:15.99
1988	1988 Winter Paralympics	Innsbruck, Austria	DQ	Slalom LW4	
1988	1988 Winter Paralympics	Innsbruck, Austria	1st	Giant Slalom LW4	1:42.99
1988	1988 Winter Paralympics	Innsbruck, Austria	DNF	Downhill LW4	

== See also ==
- List of Paralympic medalists in alpine skiing
