= Czechoslovakia at the 1976 Winter Paralympics =

- IPC code: TCH

in Örnsköldsvik
- Competitors: 5 in 2 sports
- Medals Ranked 7th: Gold 3 Silver 0 Bronze 0 Total 3

Winter Paralympics appearances (overview)
- 1976; 1980; 1984; 1988; 1992

Other related appearances
- Czech Republic (1994–pres.); Slovakia (1994–pres.)

Czechoslovakia competed at the 1976 Winter Paralympics in Örnsköldsvik, Sweden. The country's delegation consisted of five competitors in two sports: two athletes in alpine skiing, two in cross-country skiing, and one in both.

== Medalists ==
Medal	Name	Sport	Event
Gold	Eva Lemežová-Příhodová	Alpine skiing	Women's alpine combination III
Gold	Eva Lemežová-Příhodová	Alpine skiing	Women's giant slalom III
Gold	Eva Lemežová-Příhodová	Alpine skiing	Women's slalom III

== Alpine skiing ==
Athlete	Event	Time	Rank
Miloslav Klimeš	Men's combination III	295.69	10
Miloslav Klimeš	Men's giant slalom III	192.83	10
Miloslav Klimeš	Men's slalom III	106.66	13
Eva Lemežová-Příhodová	Women's combination III	0.0	Gold medal
Eva Lemežová-Příhodová	Women's giant slalom III	145.49	Gold medal
Eva Lemežová-Příhodová	Women's slalom III	123.74	Gold medal
Harald Seidel	Men's combination II	236.68	7
Harald Seidel	Men's giant slalom II	193.46	8
Harald Seidel	Men's slalom II	107.92	10

== Cross-country skiing ==
Athlete	Event	Time	Rank
Josef Búroš	Men's middle distance 15 km A	1:23:00	14
Josef Búroš	Men's short distance 10 km A	58:06	15
Miloslav Klimeš	Men's middle distance 10 km III	47:22	10
Miloslav Klimeš	Men's short distance 5 km III	23:48	11
Jiří Reichel	Men's middle distance 15 km B	1:34:02	16
Jiří Reichel	Men's short distance 10 km B	1:00:20	15

== See also ==
- Czechoslovakia at the 1976 Winter Olympics
