= Canada at the 1980 Winter Paralympics =

- Flag of Canada
- IPC code: CAN
- NPC: Canadian Paralympic Committee
- Website: www.paralympic.ca

in Geilo, Norway 1 to 7 February 1980
- Competitors: 20 in 2 sports
- Medals Ranked 8th: Gold 2 Silver 3 Bronze 1 Total 6

Winter Paralympics appearances (overview)
- 1976; 1980; 1984; 1988; 1992; 1994; 1998; 2002; 2006; 2010; 2014; 2018; 2022; 2026

Canada competed at the 1980 Winter Paralympics in Geilo, Norway from 1 to 7 February 1980. Canada sent a team of 20 athletes in two of the three disciplines at the Games; eleven in Alpine skiing and nine in Cross-country skiing.

== Medallists ==
Medal	Name	Sport	Event
Gold	Lorna Manzer	Alpine skiing	Women's slalom 2A
Gold	Lana Spreeman	Alpine skiing	Women's giant slalom 2A
Silver	Jim Cullen	Alpine skiing	Men's slalom 1A
Silver	Lorna Manzer	Alpine skiing	Women's giant slalom 2A
Silver	Greg Oswald	Alpine skiing	Men's giant slalom 1A
Bronze	Mary Brunner; Dawn Coyle; Janet Schuster; Judy Shaw	Cross-country skiing	Women's 4x5 km relay 5A-5B

== Alpine skiing ==
Men

Athlete	Event	Final	
Athlete	Event	Time	Rank
Kelly Crossman	Giant slalom 1A	2:46.38	11
Kelly Crossman	Slalom 1A	DNF	
Jim Cullen	Giant slalom 1A	2:36.57	5
Jim Cullen	Slalom 1A	1:43.22	2nd place, silver medalist(s)
Gordon Dennis	Giant slalom 2A	3:00.77	17
Gordon Dennis	Slalom 2A	1:55.14	10
Orel Kiazyk	Giant slalom 3A	DSQ	
Orel Kiazyk	Slalom 3A	1:51.79	13
Michael Kruchen	Giant slalom 3A	2:44.90	17
Michael Kruchen	Slalom 3A	2:14.12	17
Greg Oswald	Giant slalom 1A	2:32.79	2nd place, silver medalist(s)
Greg Oswald	Slalom 1A	DNF	
Lyle Verstraete	Giant slalom 2A	2:33.48	8
Lyle Verstraete	Slalom 2A	1:41.59	6
Allan Zimmermann	Giant slalom 2A	3:29.78	19
Allan Zimmermann	Slalom 2A	2:01.51	13

Women

Athlete	Event	Final	
Athlete	Event	Time	Rank
Sue Grimstead	Giant slalom 1A	2:59.39	6
Sue Grimstead	Slalom 1A	DSQ	
Lorna Manzer	Giant slalom 2A	2:46.88	2nd place, silver medalist(s)
Lorna Manzer	Slalom 2A	1:28.59	1st place, gold medalist(s)
Lana Spreeman	Giant slalom 2A	2:39.60	1st place, gold medalist(s)
Lana Spreeman	Slalom 2A	DNF	

== Cross-country skiing ==
Men

Athlete	Event	Final	
Athlete	Event	Time	Rank
William Conway	Middle distance 10 km 5A	57:58.0	18
William Conway	Long distance 20 km 5A	2:04:19.0	21
Philip Crowson	Middle distance 10 km 5B	56:56.0	22
Philip Crowson	Long distance 20 km 5B	2:05:19.0	22
Stephen Dawes	Middle distance 10 km 5B	58:28.0	23
Stephen Dawes	Long distance 20 km 5B	2:20:17.0	27
Bill Thompson	Middle distance 10 km 5B	54:04.0	17
Bill Thompson	Long distance 20 km 5B	1:57:24.0	19
William Conway; Philip Crowson; Stephen Dawes; Bill Thompson	4x10 km relay 5A-5B	3:37:52.0	6

Women

Athlete	Event	Final	
Athlete	Event	Time	Rank
Mary Brunner	Short distance 5 km 5B	38:06.0	10
Mary Brunner	Middle distance 10 km 5b	1:18:48.0	10
Dawn Coyle	Short distance 5 km 5A	32:18.0	8
Dawn Coyle	Middle distance 10 km 5A	1:04:33.0	8
Janet Erikson	Short distance 5 km 5B	39:38.0	12
Janet Erikson	Middle distance 10 km 5b	1:40:12.0	16
Janet Schuster	Short distance 5 km 5A	37:41.0	9
Janet Schuster	Middle distance 10 km 5A	1:12:50.0	9
Judy Shaw	Short distance 5 km 5B	41:13.0	13
Judy Shaw	Middle distance 10 km 5b	1:21:01.0	12
Mary Brunner; Dawn Coyle; Janet Schuster; Judy Shaw	4x5 km relay 5A-5B	2:22:03.0	3rd place, bronze medalist(s)

== See also ==
- Canada at the 1980 Winter Olympics
- Canada at the Paralympics
