= Elisabeth Osterwalder =

Swiss Para-athlete

Sport
- Country: Switzerland
- Sport: Alpine skiing Paralympic athletics
Medal record
Representing Switzerland
Summer Paralympic Games
Paralympic athletics
Gold medal – first place	1980 Arnhem	Shot put C1
Silver medal – second place	1980 Arnhem	Javelin C1
Bronze medal – third place	1980 Arnhem	Discus throw C1
Winter Paralympic Games
Alpine skiing
Gold medal – first place	1976 Ornskoldsvik	Giant slalom IV A
Gold medal – first place	1980 Geilo	Giant slalom 2B
Gold medal – first place	1980 Geilo	Slalom 2B
Silver medal – second place	1984 Innsbruck	Alpine combination LW4

Elisabeth Osterwalder is a Swiss Para-alpine skier and athlete. She represented Switzerland at the 1984 Paralympic Winter Games. She won a total of seven medals.

== Career ==
She competed at the 1976 Winter Paralympics, in Örnsköldsvik, in giant slalom IV A winning a gold medal, with a time of 3:02:07.

She competed at the 1980 Winter Paralympics in Geilo, winning gold medals in giant slalom 2B - in 3:39:11, and slalom 2B - in 2:07:16.

She competed at the 1984 Winter Paralympics, in Innsbruck, winning a silver medal in the LW4 super combined race (in 7'08" 33 ), and finishing fourth in Women's downhill LW4.

Osterwalder also competed in the Paralympic athletics competitions at the 1980 Summer Paralympics in Arnhem winning a gold medal in the shot put C1 (with the measure of 6.01 m), a silver medal in the throw of the C1 javelin (result 14.94 m), and a bronze in the C1 discus (a throw of 14.02 m ).
