= Josef Scheiber =

Austrian cross-country skier

Sport
- Country: Austria
Medal record
Paralympic Games
Bronze medal – third place	1976 Örnsköldsvik	3x10 km Relay III-IV B
Silver medal – second place	1980 Geilo	4x5 km Relay 3A-3B

Josef Scheiber is an Austrian cross-country skier. He represented Austria at the 1976 Winter Paralympics and at the 1980 Winter Paralympics. He won the bronze medal in the Men's 3x10 km Relay III-IV B event at the 1976 Winter Paralympics and the silver medal in the Men's 4x5 km Relay 3A-3B event at the 1980 Winter Paralympics.
