= Switzerland at the Paralympics =

- IPC code: SUI
- NPC: Swiss Paralympic Committee
- Website: www.swissparalympic.ch
- Medals: Gold 146 Silver 156 Bronze 152 Total 454

Summer appearances
- 1960; 1964; 1968; 1972; 1976; 1980; 1984; 1988; 1992; 1996; 2000; 2004; 2008; 2012; 2016; 2020; 2024

Winter appearances
- 1976; 1980; 1984; 1988; 1992; 1994; 1998; 2002; 2006; 2010; 2014; 2018; 2022; 2026

Switzerland made its Paralympic Games début at the inaugural Paralympic Games in Rome in 1960 (sending just two athletes, who nonetheless won four medals), and has participated in every edition of the Summer Paralympics. It also took part in the inaugural Winter Paralympics in 1976 in Örnsköldsvik, and has competed in every edition of the Winter Games.

Swiss athletes have won a total of 380 Paralympic medals, of which 117 gold, 133 silver and 130 bronze, placing the country 17th on the all-time Paralympic Games medal table. The country has won 228 medals at the Summer Games, and 152 at the Winter Games.

Switzerland's best result at the Summer Games came in 1984, when its athletes won 43 medals, of which 18 gold. Its worst result in terms of medal haul came in 1964, with just one silver medal, but it had sent a delegation of just one athlete (archer Caroline Troxler-Kung). Its highest ranking was 13th, in 1960; its lowest was 40th, in 2004. The country placed 2nd on the medal chart at the inaugural Winter Games in 1976, its best result, winning 10 gold medals. Swiss athletes also won 10 gold medals in 1998, but their highest medal haul over all came in 1988, when they took 37 medals (of which 5 gold). The country's poorest result was in 2006, when for the first time the Swiss failed to win a gold medal, and finished 13th on the medal chart, with one silver and a bronze.

Switzerland's most successful athlete, and one of the most successful Paralympians of all times, is wheelchair athlete Heinz Frei, who since his début in 1984 has won fifteen gold medals, eight silver, and twelve bronze, in track events, road cycling, and cross-country skiing. He has, in particular, won the Paralympic marathon for his disability category on two occasions, in 1984 and in 1992. In addition, wheelchair athlete Franz Nietlispach, over the course of his career from 1976 to 2004, won fourteen gold medals, six silver and one bronze in track events, from sprinting to long-distance running, as well as a bronze medal in road cycling. At the 1984 Games, he managed a virtually clean sweep of the six individual racing events he entered, winning gold in five, but taking "only" silver in the 100 metres, where he was beaten by D. Barret (full name not recorded) of the United States. At the 1988 Games, Nietlispach won six gold medals in individual races, including the 5,000 metres (though he was again beaten in the 100 metres). Rolf Heinzmann, for his part, won twelve gold medals and two silver in alpine skiing between 1980 and 2002, including a clean sweep of the downhill, slalom, giant slalom and Super-G in 1998.

== Medals by Summer Games ==
Games	Gold	Silver	Bronze	Total
1960 Rome	1	3	0	4
1964 Tokyo	0	1	0	1
1968 Tel-Aviv	0	2	6	8
1972 Heidelberg	3	2	4	9
1976 Toronto	10	12	10	32
1980 Arnhem	9	10	10	29
1984 Stoke Mandeville-New York	18	13	12	43
1988 Seoul	12	12	11	35
1992 Barcelona	6	16	13	35
1996 Atlanta	9	6	6	21
2000 Sydney	8	4	8	20
2004 Athens	2	6	8	16
2008 Beijing	3	2	6	11
2012 London	3	6	4	13
2016 Rio de Janeiro	2	2	1	5
2020 Tokyo	7	4	3	14
2024 Paris	8	8	5	21
Totals (17 entries)	101	109	107	317

== Winter Paralympics ==
Games	Gold	Silver	Bronze	Total
1976 Örnsköldsvik	10	1	1	12
1980 Geilo	4	2	4	10
1984 Innsbruck	5	16	16	37
1988 Innsbruck	8	7	8	23
1992 Albertville	3	8	4	15
1994 Lillehammer	2	9	5	16
1998 Nagano	10	5	8	23
2002 Salt Lake City	6	4	2	12
2006 Torino	0	1	1	2
2010 Vancouver	1	2	0	3
2014 Sochi	1	0	0	1
2018 PyeongChang	3	0	0	3
2022 Beijing	0	0	1	1
2026 Milano Cortina	2	2	2	6
Totals (14 entries)	55	57	52	164

== Multi-medalists ==
Swiss athletes who have won at least three gold medals or five or more medals of any colour.

=== Summer Paralympics ===
No.	Athlete	Sport	Years	Games	Gender	Gold	Silver	Bronze	Total
1	Heinz Frei	Athletics; Cycling	1984-2012	8	M	14	6	6	26
2	Franz Nietlispach	Athletics; Cycling	1976-2008	9	M	14	6	2	22
3	Marcel Hug	Athletics	2004-2024	6	M	7	5	3	15
4	Urs Kolly	Athletics	1992-2008	5	M	7	0	1	8
5	Catherine Debrunner	Athletics	2016-2024	3	F	6	1	1	8
6	Rainer Küschall	Athletics; Table tennis	1968-1992	7	M	5	10	5	20
7	Lukas Christen	Athletics	1992-2000	3	M	5	3	0	8
8	Manuela Schär	Athletics	2004-2024	6	F	3	5	2	10
9	Edith Wolf	Athletics	2004-2012	3	F	2	4	2	8
10	Ursina Greuter	Athletics	1996-2000	2	F	2	1	3	6

=== Winter Paralympics ===
No.	Athlete	Sport	Years	Games	Gender	Gold	Silver	Bronze	Total
1	Rolf Heinzmann	Alpine skiing	1980-2002	5	M	14	2	0	16
2	Hans Burn	Alpine skiing	1988-2006	6	M	6	5	3	14
3	Théo Gmür	Alpine skiing	2018-2022	2	M	3	0	1	4
4	Irene Moillen	Alpine skiing	1976-1980	2	F	3	0	0	3

== See also ==
- Switzerland at the Olympics
- Switzerland at the European Games
