= Norway at the 1976 Winter Paralympics =

- IPC code: NOR
- NPC: Norwegian Olympic and Paralympic Committee and Confederation of Sports
- Website: www.idrett.no
- Competitors: 23 (16 men and 7 women) in 2 sports
- Medals Ranked 12th: Gold 7 Silver 3 Bronze 2 Total 12

Winter Paralympics appearances (overview)
- 1976; 1980; 1984; 1988; 1992; 1994; 1998; 2002; 2006; 2010; 2014; 2018; 2022; 2026

Norway competed at the 1976 Winter Paralympics in Örnsköldsvik, Sweden. 23 competitors from Norway won 12 medals including 7 gold, 3 silver and 2 bronze and finished 4th in the medal table. Norway competed both in alpine skiing and cross-country skiing. All medals were won in cross-country skiing.

== Alpine skiing ==
Two athletes represented Norway in alpine skiing: Per Christian Blomquist and Finn Soerensen.

Blomquist competed in the Men's Giant Slalom I and Men's Slalom I events. He finished in 9th and 14th place respectively.

Soerensen competed in the Men's Alpine Combination II, Men's Giant Slalom II and Men's Slalom II events.

== Cross-country ==
The medalists are:

- (gold) Jarle Johnsen Men's Middle Distance 15 km A
- (gold) Terje Hansen, Jarle Johnsen, Morten Langeroed Men's 3x10 km Relay A-B
- (gold) Reidun Laengen Women's Middle Distance 10 km B
- (gold) Morten Langeroed Men's Middle Distance 15 km B
- (gold) Morten Langeroed Men's Short Distance 10 km B
- (gold) Vigdis Bente Mordre Women's Middle Distance 10 km I
- (gold) Vigdis Bente Mordre Women's Short Distance 5 km I
- (silver) Aud Berntsen, Aud Grundvik, Reidun Laengen Women's 3x5 km Relay A-B
- (silver) Reidun Laengen Women's Short Distance 5 km B
- (silver) Jarle Johnsen Men's Short Distance 10 km A
- (bronze) Terje Hansen Men's Middle Distance 15 km B
- (bronze) Terje Hansen Men's Short Distance 10 km B

== See also ==
- Norway at the Paralympics
- Norway at the 1976 Winter Olympics
