= Peter Portisch =

West German para-alpine skier

Sport
- Country: Germany
- Sport: Para-alpine skiing
Medal record
Paralympic Games
Silver medal – second place	1976 Örnsköldsvik	Slalom II

Peter Portisch is a West German para-alpine skier. He represented West Germany in alpine skiing at the 1976 Winter Paralympics.

He won the silver medal at the Men's Slalom II event, the only event he competed in.

== See also ==
- List of Paralympic medalists in alpine skiing
