= United States at the 1980 Winter Paralympics =

- Flag of the United States
- IPC code: USA
- NPC: United States Paralympic Committee
- Website: www.teamusa.org/US-Paralympics
- Competitors: 26 (16 men and 10 women) in 3 sports
- Medals: Gold 4 Silver 1 Bronze 1 Total 6

Winter Paralympics appearances (overview)
- 1976; 1980; 1984; 1988; 1992; 1994; 1998; 2002; 2006; 2010; 2014; 2018; 2022; 2026

The United States competed at the 1980 Winter Paralympics in Geilo, Norway. 26 competitors from the United States won four gold medals, one silver medal and one bronze medal and finished 6th in the medal table. All medals were won in alpine skiing.

== Alpine skiing ==
The medalists are:

- (gold) Cindy Castellano, Women's Giant Slalom 3A
- (gold) Cindy Castellano, Women's Slalom 3A
- (gold) Doug Keil, Men's Giant Slalom 4
- (gold) Doug Keil, Men's Slalom 4
- (silver) Kathy Poohachof Women's Giant Slalom 3A
- (bronze) Janet Penn, Women's Giant Slalom 2A

== Cross-country ==
Seven athletes competed in events in cross-country skiing. No medals were won.

== Ice sledge speed racing ==
Peter Axelson competed in three events (Men's 100 m II, Men's 500 m II and Men's 1500 m II). He did not win any medals.

== See also ==
- United States at the Paralympics
- United States at the 1980 Winter Olympics
