= Traudl Weber =

German para-alpine skier

Sport
- Country: Germany
- Sport: Para-alpine skiing
Medal record
Paralympic Games
Silver medal – second place	1976 Örnsköldsvik	Alpine Combination III
Silver medal – second place	1976 Örnsköldsvik	Giant Slalom III
Silver medal – second place	1976 Örnsköldsvik	Slalom III

Traudl Weber is a German para-alpine skier. She represented West Germany in alpine skiing at the 1976 Winter Paralympics.

She won the silver medal at the Women's Alpine Combination III event, the Women's Giant Slalom III event and the Women's Slalom III event. At each of these events Eva Lemežová-Příhodová, representing Czechoslovakia won the gold medal. There was also no bronze medal awarded at each of these events.

== See also ==
- List of Paralympic medalists in alpine skiing
