= Petra Merkert =

West German para-alpine skier

Sport
- Country: West Germany
- Sport: Para-alpine skiing
Medal record
Paralympic Games
Gold medal – first place	1976 Örnsköldsvik	Alpine Combination IV B
Gold medal – first place	1976 Örnsköldsvik	Giant Slalom IV B
Gold medal – first place	1976 Örnsköldsvik	Slalom IV B

Petra Merkert is a West German para-alpine skier. She represented West Germany at alpine skiing at the 1976 Winter Paralympics held in Örnsköldsvik, Sweden.

She won gold medals at the Alpine Combination IV B event, the Giant Slalom IV B and the Slalom IV B event.

== Achievements ==
Year	Competition	Location	Position	Event	Time
1976	1976 Winter Paralympics	Örnsköldsvik, Sweden	1st	Alpine Combination IV B	0:00
1976	1976 Winter Paralympics	Örnsköldsvik, Sweden	1st	Giant Slalom IV B	2:34.08
1976	1976 Winter Paralympics	Örnsköldsvik, Sweden	1st	Slalom IV B	2:17.33

== See also ==
- List of Paralympic medalists in alpine skiing
