= Peter Braun (skier) =

West German para-alpine skier

Sport
- Country: Germany
- Sport: Para-alpine skiing
Medal record
Paralympic Games
Bronze medal – third place	1976 Örnsköldsvik	Giant Slalom IV B

Peter Braun is a West German para-alpine skier. He represented West Germany at alpine skiing at the 1976 Winter Paralympics.

He won the bronze medal at the Men's Giant Slalom IV B event, the only event he competed in.

== See also ==
- List of Paralympic medalists in alpine skiing
