= Cindy Castellano =

American para-alpine skier

Sport
- Country: United States
- Sport: Para-alpine skiing
Medal record
Paralympic Games
Gold medal – first place	1980 Geilo	Giant Slalom 3A
Gold medal – first place	1980 Geilo	Slalom 3A

Cindy Castellano is a retired American para-alpine skier. She won two gold medals in alpine skiing at the 1980 Winter Paralympics held in Geilo, Norway. She won the gold medal in the women's giant slalom 3A and women's slalom 3A events.

Her medals are on display at the United States Olympic & Paralympic Museum.

== See also ==
- List of Paralympic medalists in alpine skiing
