= Felix Gisler =

Swiss para-alpine skier

Sport
- Country: Switzerland
- Sport: Para-alpine skiing
Medal record
Paralympic Games
Gold medal – first place	1976 Örnsköldsvik	Slalom IV B
Silver medal – second place	1980 Geilo	Giant Slalom 3B
Silver medal – second place	1984 Innsbruck	Giant Slalom LW5/7
Silver medal – second place	1984 Innsbruck	Alpine Combination LW5/7

Felix Gisler is a Swiss para-alpine skier. He represented Switzerland in four Winter Paralympics: 1976, 1980, 1984 and 1988. In total, he won one gold medal and three silver medals.

He also competed in the Men's giant slalom for double-arm amputees event at disabled skiing, a demonstration sport during the 1984 Winter Olympics.

== Achievements ==
Year	Competition	Location	Position	Event	Time
1976	1976 Winter Paralympics	Örnsköldsvik, Sweden	1st	Men's Slalom IV B	1:46.25
1980	1980 Winter Paralympics	Geilo, Norway	2nd	Men's Giant Slalom 3B	2:32.15
1984	1984 Winter Paralympics	Innsbruck, Austria	2nd	Men's Giant Slalom LW5/7	1:30.29
1984	1984 Winter Paralympics	Innsbruck, Austria	2nd	Men's Alpine Combination LW5/7	1:42.59

== See also ==
- List of Paralympic medalists in alpine skiing
