= Marilyn Hamilton =

Paralympic skier

Marylin Hamilton (born in 1949) is an American inventor, athlete, and entrepreneur, known as the co-founder of Quickie Wheelchairs. After a 1978 hang-gliding accident left her paraplegic, Hamilton sought to improve wheelchair design, co-creating the lightweight and customizable Quickie wheelchair in 1980 with Jim Okamoto and Don Helman.

== Biography ==
Marilyn Hamilton was born in 1949 and grew up in Dinuba, California. In 1967, she was crowned the National Raisin Queen.

Her life took a drastic turn in 1978 when, at 29 years old, she suffered a severe accident that left her paraplegic. Drawing from her background in hang gliding, Hamilton along with Jim Okamoto and Don Helman co-founded Quickie Wheelchairs in 1980. Their goal was to design a wheelchair that would combine advanced materials, adjustability, and vibrant colors, allowing users to personalize their mobility devices. The resulting Quickie wheelchair featured a lightweight aluminum frame, making it easier to maneuver, and offered various accessories and color options, making it a new product in the wheelchair industry. Quickie was one of the first wheelchairs to offer these features, leading to its widespread adoption.

After her accident, Hamilton became a competitive athlete, excelling in adaptive sports. She won a silver medal in alpine skiing at the 1982 Paralympics and became the National Wheelchair Tennis Singles Champion in 1982 and 1983.

After co-founding Quickie Wheelchairs and working with the company for over two decades, Hamilton transitioned to the CEO of StimDesigns, a company focused on the distribution of the Galileo neuromuscular training device.

== Awards and honors ==
Hamilton was also inducted into the Fresno Athletic Hall of Fame in 2024, recognizing her dual impact as an athlete and inventor.

== See also ==
- Adaptive Sports
