= Norway at the 1980 Winter Paralympics =

- IPC code: NOR
- NPC: Norwegian Olympic and Paralympic Committee and Confederation of Sports
- Website: www.idrett.no (in Norwegian)

in Geilo
- Competitors: 37
- Medals Ranked 1st: Gold 23 Silver 21 Bronze 10 Total 54

Winter Paralympics appearances (overview)
- 1976; 1980; 1984; 1988; 1992; 1994; 1998; 2002; 2006; 2010; 2014; 2018; 2022; 2026

Norway sent a delegation to the second Winter Paralympics in 1980 in Geilo, Norway. The country was represented by thirty seven athletes, the second most of any nation after Austria. They sent twenty seven men and ten women. Norway won fifty four medals, the most of any country at the games. They won twenty three gold medals, twenty one silver and ten bronze.

Norway was able to send athletes of all physical disabilities, as all classes of athletes with physical disabilities were able to participate.
