= Rolf Heinzmann =

Swiss para-alpine skier

Sport
- Country: Switzerland
- Sport: Para-alpine skiing
Medal record
Paralympic Games
Gold medal – first place	1980 Geilo	Slalom 3A
Gold medal – first place	1980 Geilo	Giant Slalom 3A
Gold medal – first place	1984 Innsbruck	Slalom LW6/8
Gold medal – first place	1984 Innsbruck	Downhill LW6/8
Gold medal – first place	1984 Innsbruck	Alpine Combination LW6/8
Silver medal – second place	1994 Lillehammer	Super-G LW6/8
Gold medal – first place	1998 Nagano	Slalom LW6/8
Gold medal – first place	1998 Nagano	Super-G LW6/8
Gold medal – first place	1998 Nagano	Giant Slalom LW6/8
Gold medal – first place	1998 Nagano	Downhill LW6/8
Silver medal – second place	2002 Salt Lake City	Slalom LW6/8
Gold medal – first place	2002 Salt Lake City	Super-G LW6/8
Gold medal – first place	2002 Salt Lake City	Giant Slalom LW6/8
Gold medal – first place	2002 Salt Lake City	Downhill LW6/8

Rolf Heinzmann is a Swiss para-alpine skier. He represented Switzerland at the Winter Paralympics in 1980, 1984, 1994, 1998 and 2002.

== Career ==
Heinzmann represented Switzerland in five editions of the Winter Paralympics and, in total, he won twelve gold medals and two silver medals.

In 1984, he competed in the disabled skiing event which was held as demonstration sport at the 1984 Winter Olympics.

== Achievements ==
Year	Competition	Location	Position	Event	Time
1980	1980 Winter Paralympics	Geilo, Norway	1st	Men's Slalom 3A	1:30.84
1980	1980 Winter Paralympics	Geilo, Norway	1st	Men's Giant Slalom 3A	2:12.40
1984	1984 Winter Paralympics	Innsbruck, Austria	1st	Men's Slalom LW6/8	1:07.73
1984	1984 Winter Paralympics	Innsbruck, Austria	1st	Men's Downhill LW6/8	1:02.25
1984	1984 Winter Paralympics	Innsbruck, Austria	1st	Men's Alpine Combination LW6/8	0:32.76
1994	1994 Winter Paralympics	Lillehammer, Norway	2nd	Men's Super-G LW6/8	1:13.18
1998	1998 Winter Paralympics	Nagano, Japan	1st	Men's Slalom LW6/8	1:52.24
1998	1998 Winter Paralympics	Nagano, Japan	1st	Men's Super-G LW6/8	1:12.34
1998	1998 Winter Paralympics	Nagano, Japan	1st	Men's Giant Slalom LW6/8	2:30.57
1998	1998 Winter Paralympics	Nagano, Japan	1st	Men's Downhill LW6/8	1:05.71
2002	2002 Winter Paralympics	Salt Lake City, United States of America	2nd	Men's Slalom LW6/8	1:32.74
2002	2002 Winter Paralympics	Salt Lake City, United States of America	1st	Men's Super-G LW6/8	1:16.17
2002	2002 Winter Paralympics	Salt Lake City, United States of America	1st	Men's Giant Slalom LW6/8	2:14.42
2002	2002 Winter Paralympics	Salt Lake City, United States of America	1st	Men's Downhill LW6/8	1:24.26

== See also ==
- List of Paralympic medalists in alpine skiing
