= 1976 Winter Paralympics medal table =

1976 Winter Paralympics medals
- Location: Örnsköldsvik Sweden

Highlights
- Most gold medals: West Germany (10)
- Most total medals: Austria (35)
- Medalling NPCs: 9

The 1976 Winter Paralympics medal table is a list of National Paralympic Committees (NPCs) ranked by the number of gold medals won by their athletes during the 1976 Winter Paralympics (the inaugural Winter Paralympic Games), held in Örnsköldsvik, Sweden, from February 21 to 28, 1976.

== Medal table ==
The ranking in this table is based on information provided by the International Paralympic Committee (IPC) and is consistent with IPC convention in its published medal tables. By default, the table is ordered by the number of gold medals the athletes from a nation have won (in this context, a "nation" is an entity represented by a National Paralympic Committee). The number of silver medals is taken into consideration next and then the number of bronze medals. If nations are still tied, equal ranking is given and they are listed alphabetically by IPC country code.

To sort this table by nation, total medal count, or any other column, click on the icon next to the column title.

* Host nation (Sweden)

| Rank | Nation | Gold | Silver | Bronze | Total |
|---|---|---|---|---|---|
| 1 | West Germany | 10 | 12 | 6 | 28 |
| 2 | Switzerland | 10 | 1 | 1 | 12 |
| 3 | Finland | 8 | 7 | 7 | 22 |
| 4 | Norway | 7 | 3 | 2 | 12 |
| 5 | Sweden* | 6 | 7 | 7 | 20 |
| 6 | Austria | 5 | 16 | 14 | 35 |
| 7 | Czechoslovakia | 3 | 0 | 0 | 3 |
| 8 | France | 2 | 0 | 3 | 5 |
| 9 | Canada | 2 | 0 | 2 | 4 |
| Totals (9 entries) | | 53 | 46 | 42 | 141 |

== See also ==
- 1976 Winter Olympics medal table
- 1976 Summer Paralympics medal table
