= Swiss Paralympic Committee =

National Paralympic Committee of Switzerland

National Paralympic Committee
- Country: Switzerland
- Code: SUI
- Continental association: EPC
- Headquarters: Bern, Switzerland
- President: Laurent Prince
- Secretary General: Conchita Jäger
- Website: www.swissparalympic.ch

The Swiss Paralympic Committee (German: Schweizerisches Paralympisches Komitee; French: Comité paralympique suisse; Italian: Comitato Svizzero Paralimpico; Romansh: Comitati Paralimpica Svizra) is the National Paralympic Committee in Switzerland for the Paralympic Games movement. It is a non-profit organisation that selects athletes and teams, and raises funds to send Swiss competitors to the Paralympic Games, European Championships and World Championships, most of the events are organised by the International Paralympic Committee (IPC).

== See also ==
- Switzerland at the Paralympics
