= 1980 Winter Paralympics =

Multi-parasport event in Gelio, Norway

II Paralympic Winter Games
- Location: Geilo, Norway
- Nations: 18
- Athletes: 299
- Events: 64 in 3 sports
- Opening: 1 February 1980
- Closing: 7 February 1980
- Opened by: King Olav V
- Stadium: Vestia Resort

The 1980 Winter Paralympic Games (Norwegian: Paralympiske vinterleker 1980; Nynorsk: Paralympiske vinterleikane 1980), the second Winter Paralympics, were held from 1 to 7 February 1980 in Geilo, Norway. Eighteen countries took part with 299 athletes. A demonstration event was held in sledge downhill racing. All classes of athletes with locomotor disabilities were able to participate. Organized by the International Stoke Mandeville Games Federation (ISMGF) and the International Sports Federation of the Disabled (ISOD).

Originally known as the 2nd Olympic Winter Games for Disabled.

== Sports ==
- Alpine skiing
- Ice sledge speed racing
- Cross-country skiing
- Sledge Downhill racing (demonstration event)

== Medal table ==
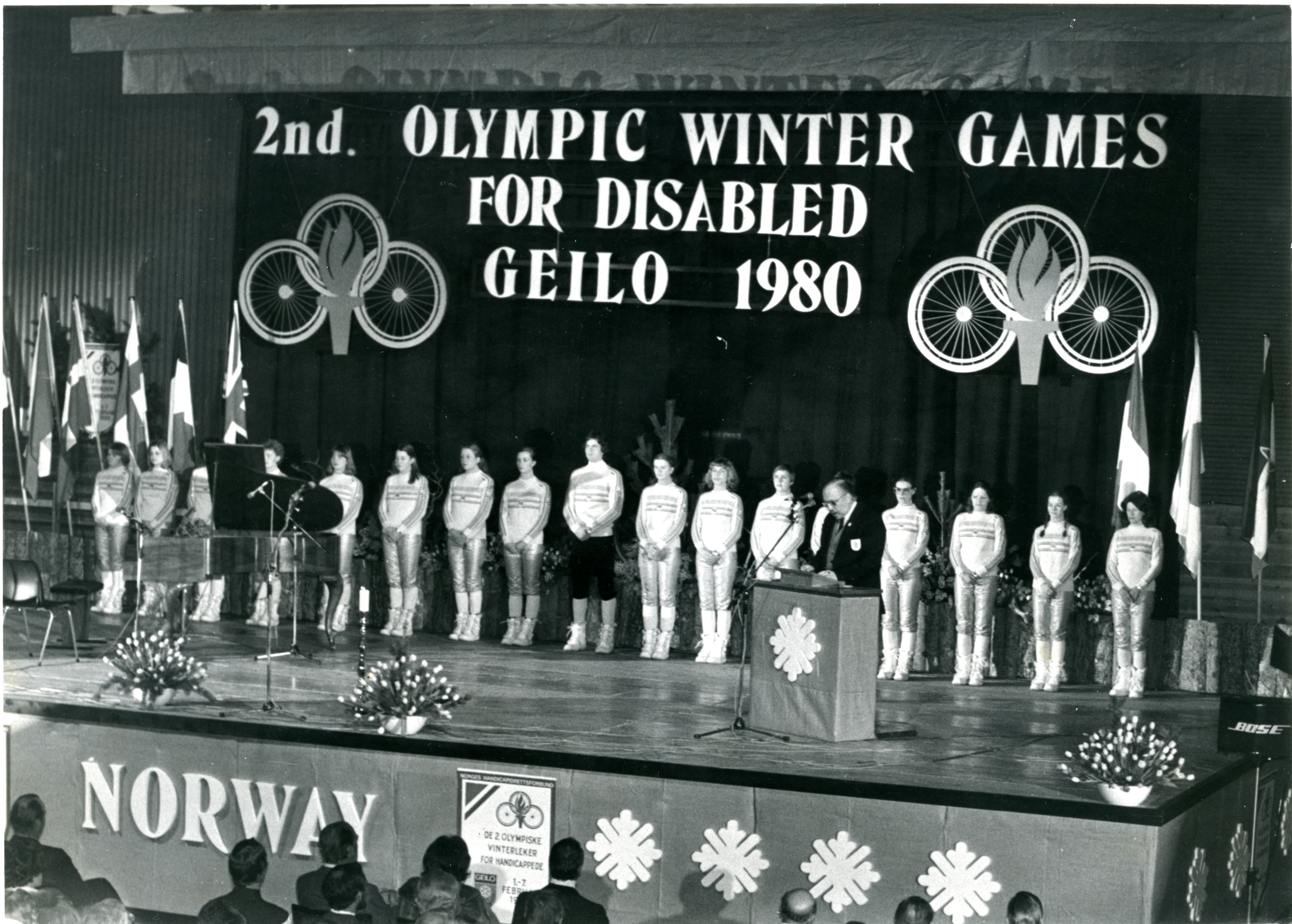
The 1980 Winter Paralympics opening ceremony

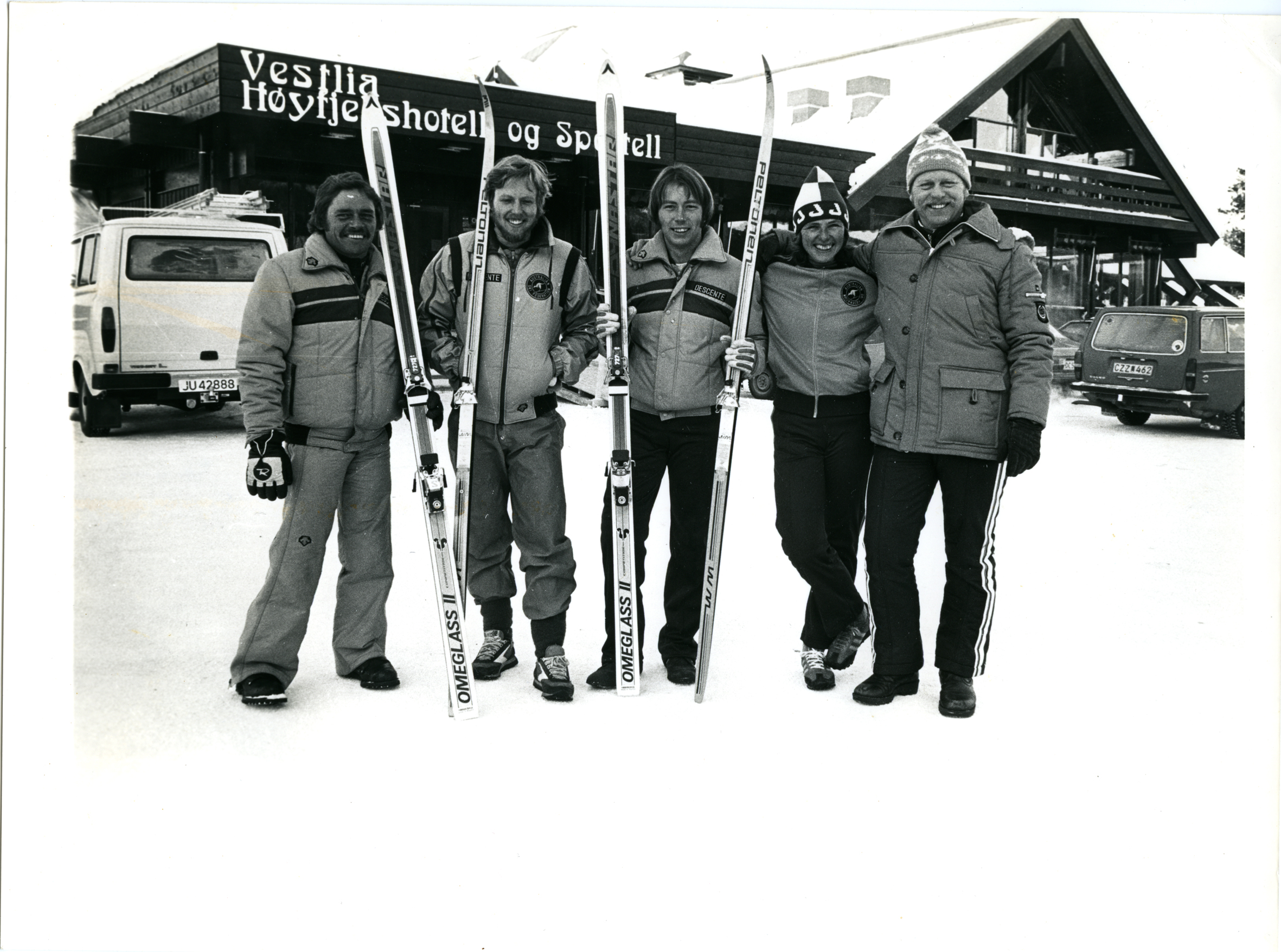
Australian paralympic team at the 1980 Winter Paralympics

The top 10 NPCs by number of gold medals are listed below. The host nation (Norway) is highlighted.

Rank	Nation	Gold	Silver	Bronze	Total
1	Norway*	23	21	10	54
2	Finland	16	7	12	35
3	Austria	6	10	6	22
4	Sweden	5	3	8	16
5	Switzerland	4	2	4	10
6	United States	4	1	1	6
7	West Germany	3	6	9	18
8	Canada	2	3	1	6
9	France	1	1	1	3
10	Czechoslovakia	0	1	0	1
Totals (10 entries)		64	55	52	171

== Participating nations ==
Eighteen nations participated in the 1980 Winter Paralympics. Australia, Denmark, Italy and New Zealand made their debut appearances. Belgium and Poland did not send any athletes.

- Australia (2)
- Austria (34)
- Canada (20)
- Czechoslovakia (3)
- Denmark (8)
- Finland (29)
- France (21)
- Great Britain (8)
- Italy (1)
- Japan (5)
- New Zealand (3)
- Norway (37) (Host nation)
- Sweden (27)
- Switzerland (27)
- Uganda (1)
- United States (26)
- West Germany (38)
- Yugoslavia (9)

== See also ==
- 1980 Winter Olympics
- 1980 Summer Paralympics

Preceded by Örnsköldsvik	Winter Paralympics; Geilo; II Paralympic Winter Games (1980)	Succeeded by Innsbruck
