= 1976 Winter Paralympics =

Multi-parasport event in Örnsköldsvik, Sweden

I Paralympic Winter Games
- Location: Örnsköldsvik, Sweden
- Nations: 16
- Athletes: 196
- Events: 53 in 2 sports
- Opening: 21 February 1976
- Closing: 28 February 1976
- Opened by: King Carl XVI Gustaf
- Stadium: Kempehallen

The 1976 Winter Paralympic Games (Swedish: Paralympiska vinterspelen 1976) were the first Winter Paralympics. They were held in Örnsköldsvik, Sweden, from 21 to 28 February 1976. The disabilities included in this Paralympics were blindness and amputees. Sixteen countries took part with 196 athletes. There were competitions in Alpine and Nordic skiing for amputee and visually impaired athletes, and a demonstration event in ice sledge racing.

They were originally known as the 1st Winter Olympic Games for the Disabled.

== Sports ==
The games consisted of 2 sports.

- Alpine skiing
- Cross-country skiing

== Medal table ==
The top 9 NPCs by number of gold medals are listed below. The host nation (Sweden) is highlighted.

Rank	Nation	Gold	Silver	Bronze	Total
1	West Germany	10	12	6	28
2	Switzerland	10	1	1	12
3	Finland	8	7	7	22
4	Norway	7	3	2	12
5	Sweden*	6	7	7	20
6	Austria	5	16	14	35
7	Czechoslovakia	3	0	0	3
8	France	2	0	3	5
9	Canada	2	0	2	4
Totals (9 entries)		53	46	42	141

== Participating Paralympic Committees ==
The following nations took part. In brackets is the number of athletes per nation.

Participating National Paralympic Committees
- Austria (24)
- Belgium (5)
- Canada (6)
- Czechoslovakia (5)
- Finland (26)
- France (21)
- Great Britain (6)
- Japan (1)
- Norway (23)
- Poland (7)
- Sweden (16)
- Switzerland (15)
- Uganda (1)
- United States (1)
- West Germany (32)
- Yugoslavia (9)

British involvement in these Games was covered in an edition of the Thames Television current affairs series This Week.

== See also ==
- 1976 Winter Olympics
- 1976 Summer Paralympics

New sporting event	Winter Paralympics; Örnsköldsvik; I Paralympic Winter Games (1976)	Succeeded by Geilo
