= Alpine skiing at the 1992 Winter Paralympics =

Alpine skiing at the V Paralympic Winter Games

Former Paralympic symbol (1988-1994)

Alpine skiing at the 1992 Winter Paralympics consisted of 48 events, 30 for men and 18 for women.

== Medal table ==
Rank	Nation	Gold medal	Silver medal	Bronze medal	Total
1	United States (USA)	18	16	8	42
2	Germany (GER)	9	7	6	22
3	Austria (AUT)	8	2	6	16
4	France (FRA)	4	5	5	14
5	Switzerland (SUI)	3	5	2	10
6	Canada (CAN)	2	4	6	12
7	New Zealand (NZL)	2	0	0	2
8	Australia (AUS)	1	1	2	4
9	Sweden (SWE)	1	1	1	3
10	Czechoslovakia (TCH)	0	3	1	4
11	Great Britain (GBR)	0	1	4	5
12	Spain (ESP)	0	1	2	3
13	Italy (ITA)	0	1	1	2
14	Denmark (DEN)	0	1	0	1
15	Japan (JPN)	0	0	2	2
16	Norway (NOR)	0	0	1	1
Total		48	47	47	142

== Medal summary ==
The competition events were:

- Downhill: men – women
- Super-G: men – women
- Giant slalom: men – women
- Slalom: men – women

Each event had separate standing, sitting, or visually impaired classifications:

- LW2 - standing: single leg amputation above the knee
- LW 3 - standing: double leg amputation below the knee, mild cerebral palsy, or equivalent impairment
- LW4 - standing: single leg amputation below the knee
- LW5/7 - standing: double arm amputation
- LW6/8 - standing: single arm amputation
- LW9 - standing: amputation or equivalent impairment of one arm and one leg
- LW 10 - sitting: paraplegia with no or some upper abdominal function and no functional sitting balance
- LW 11 - sitting: paraplegia with fair functional sitting balance
- B1 - visually impaired: no functional vision
- B2 - visually impaired: up to ca 3-5% functional vision
- B3 - visually impaired: under 10% functional vision

=== Men's events ===
Event	Class	Gold	Silver	Bronze
Downhill	LW1,3,5/7,9	Gerd Schoenfelder; Germany	Jean-Luc Jiguet; France	Jeff Dickson; Canada
Downhill	LW2	Greg Mannino; United States	Juerg Gadient; Switzerland	Alexander Spitz; Germany
Downhill	LW4	Hans Burn; Switzerland	Paul Fournier; Switzerland	Rik Heid; United States
Downhill	LW6/8	Meinhard Tatschl; Austria	Markus Pfefferle; Germany	Lionel Brun; France
Downhill	LW10	Chad Colley; United States	Michael McDougal; United States	Matthew Stockford; Great Britain
Downhill	LW11	Jim Martinson; United States	David Kiley; United States	Ludovic Rey-Robert; France
Super-G	B1	Bruno Kuehne; Austria	Greg Evangelatos; United States	Mats Linder; Sweden
Super-G	B2	Stephane Saas; France	Manuel Buendía; Spain	Odo Habermann; Austria
Super-G	B3	Brian Santos; United States	Bruno Oberhammer; Italy	Richard Burt; Great Britain
Super-G	LW1,3,5/7,9	Gerd Schoenfelder; Germany	Jean-Luc Jiguet; France	Jeff Dickson; Canada
Super-G	LW2	Greg Mannino; United States	Michael Milton; Australia	Alexander Spitz; Germany
Super-G	LW4	Patrick Cooper; New Zealand	Rik Heid; United States	Hans Burn; Switzerland
Super-G	LW6/8	Meinhard Tatschl; Austria	Frank Pfortmueller; Germany	Markus Pfefferle; Germany
Super-G	LW10	Chad Colley; United States	Bruno Fallet; Switzerland	Matthew Stockford; Great Britain
Super-G	LW11	David Kiley; United States	Jacques Blanc; Switzerland	David Munk; Australia
Giant slalom	B2	Stephane Saas; France	Lars Nielsen; Denmark	Marcos Manuel Llados; Spain
Giant slalom	B3	Brian Santos; United States	Richard Burt; Great Britain	Bruno Oberhammer; Italy
Giant slalom	LW1,3,5/7,9	Gerd Schoenfelder; Germany	Eberhard Seischab; Germany	Jean-Luc Jiguet; France
Giant slalom	LW2	Alexander Spitz; Germany	Greg Mannino; United States	Juerg Gadient; Switzerland
Giant slalom	LW4	Hans Burn; Switzerland	Rik Heid; United States	Wilfried Maetzler; Austria
Giant slalom	LW6/8	Lionel Brun; France	Markus Pfefferle; Germany	Chris Griffin; United States
Giant slalom	LW10	Reinhold Sager; Austria	Chris Waddell; United States	Matthew Stockford; Great Britain
Giant slalom	LW11	David Kiley; United States	Jacques Blanc; Switzerland	Karl Lotz; Germany
Slalom	LW1,3,5/7,9	Jeff Dickson; Canada	Jean-Luc Jiguet; France	Tristan Mouric; France
Slalom	LW2	Michael Milton; Australia	Greg Mannino; United States	Rainer Bergmann; Austria
Slalom	LW4	Patrick Cooper; New Zealand	Rik Heid; United States	Ewald Vogl; Germany
Slalom	LW6/8	Lionel Brun; France	Markus Pfefferle; Germany	Reed Robinson; United States
Slalom	LW10	Reinhold Sager; Austria	Chris Waddell; United States	Michael McDougal; United States
Slalom	LW11	Jacques Blanc; Switzerland	David Kiley; United States	Michael Norton; Australia

=== Women's events ===
Event	Class	Gold	Silver	Bronze
Downhill	LW2	Sarah Billmeier; United States	Cathy Gentile-Patti; United States	Roni Sasaki; United States
Downhill	LW3,4,9	Reinhild Moeller; Germany	Barbara Jordan; Austria	Lana Spreeman; Canada
Downhill	LW5/7,6/8	Nancy Gustafson; United States	Sandra Lynes; Canada	Caroline Viau; Canada
Downhill	LW10-11	Sarah Will; United States	Gerda Pamler; Germany	Candace Cable; United States
Super-G	B1-3	Elisabeth Dos-Kellner; Austria	Katerina Tepla; Czechoslovakia	Andrea Piribauer; Austria
Super-G	LW2	Roni Sasaki; United States	Sarah Billmeier; United States	Helga Knapp; Austria
Super-G	LW3,4,9	Reinhild Moeller; Germany	Lana Spreeman; Canada	Renate Hjortland; Norway
Super-G	LW5/7,6/8	Caroline Viau; Canada	Marcela Misunova; Czechoslovakia	Dagmar Vollmer; Germany
Super-G	LW10-11	Sarah Will; United States	Gerda Pamler; Germany	Toshiko Gouno; Japan
Giant slalom	B1-3	Elisabeth Dos-Kellner; Austria	Katerina Tepla; Czechoslovakia	Magda Amo; Spain
Giant slalom	LW2	Sarah Billmeier; United States	Cathy Gentile-Patti; United States	Nadine Laurent; France
Giant slalom	LW3,4,9	Reinhild Moeller; Germany	Barbara Jordan; Austria	Lana Spreeman; Canada
Giant slalom	LW5/7,6/8	Nancy Gustafson; United States	Sandra Lynes; Canada	Caroline Viau; Canada
Giant slalom	LW10-11	Marit Ruth; Sweden	Shannon Bloedel; United States	Candace Cable; United States
Slalom	LW2	Helga Knapp; Austria	Nadine Laurent; France	Roni Sasaki; United States
Slalom	LW3,4,9	Reinhild Moeller; Germany	Lana Spreeman; Canada	Barbara Jordan; Austria
Slalom	LW5/7,6/8	Nancy Gustafson; United States	Maria Sund; Sweden	Marcela Misunova; Czechoslovakia
Slalom	LW10-11	Gerda Pamler; Germany	Candace Cable; United States	Toshiko Gouno; Japan

== See also ==
- Alpine skiing at the 1992 Winter Olympics
