= Unified Team at the 1992 Winter Paralympics =

- The Paralympic flag
- IPC code: EUN

in Tignes-Albertville
- Competitors: 21
- Medals Ranked 3rd: Gold 10 Silver 8 Bronze 3 Total 21

Winter Paralympics appearances (overview)
- 1992

Other related appearances
- Soviet Union (1988); Estonia (1992–pres.); Latvia (1994–pres.); Lithuania (1994–pres.); Belarus (1994–pres.); Kazakhstan (1994–pres.); Russia (1994–2014); Armenia (1998–pres.); Ukraine (1998–pres.); Kyrgyzstan (2014–pres.); Uzbekistan (2014–pres.); Georgia (2018–pres.); Tajikistan (2018–pres.); Neutral Paralympic Athletes (2018)

Unified Team competed at the 1992 Winter Paralympics in Tignes/Albertville, France. 21 competitors from Unified Team, 16 men and 5 women, won 21 medals including 10 gold, 8 silver and 3 bronze and finished 3rd in the medal table, behind the United States and a reunified Germany.

The team was led by Nikolai Ilioutchenko.

At these Paralympic Games, only alpine and Nordic skiing (biathlon and cross-country skiing) competitions were held, as venues could not be made available for ice sports.

== Medalists ==
Medal	Name	Sport	Event
Gold	Boris Bogdanov	Biathlon	Men's 7.5 kilometres B1
Gold	Valeri Kupchinski	Cross-country skiing	Men's 10 kilometres - short distance B1
Gold	Valeri Kupchinski	Cross-country skiing	Men's 30 kilometres - short distance B1
Gold	Nikolai Ilioutchenko	Cross-country skiing	Men's 10 kilometres - short distance B3
Gold	Nikolai Ilioutchenko	Cross-country skiing	Men's 30 kilometres - short distance B3
Gold	Nikolai Ilioutchenko; Valeri Kupchinski; Sergei Lozhkin	Cross-country skiing	Men's 3 × 5 kilometres relay B1-3
Gold	Olga Nazarenko	Cross-country skiing	Women's 5 kilometres - short distance B1
Gold	Alevtina Elessina	Cross-country skiing	Women's 5 kilometres - short distance B2-3
Gold	Lioubov Paninykh	Cross-country skiing	Women's 10 km - long distance B1
Gold	Nadejda Tchirkova	Cross-country skiing	Women's 10 km - long distance B2-3
Silver	Boris Bogdanov	Cross-country skiing	Men's 10 km - short distance B1
Silver	Boris Bogdanov	Cross-country skiing	Men's 30 km - long distance B1
Silver	Vladimir Kolesnikov	Cross-country skiing	Men's 10 km - short distance B2
Silver	Vladimir Kolesnikov	Cross-country skiing	Men's 30 km - long distance B2
Silver	Sergei Lozhkin	Cross-country skiing	Men's 30 km - short distance B3
Silver	Nadejda Tchirkova	Cross-country skiing	Women's 5 kilometres - short distance B2-3
Silver	Olga Nazarenko	Cross-country skiing	Women's 10 km - long distance B1
Silver	Alevtina Elessina	Cross-country skiing	Women's 10 km - long distance B2-3
Bronze	Lev Seleznev	Cross-country skiing	Men's 10 km - short distance B2
Bronze	Lev Seleznev	Cross-country skiing	Men's 30 km - long distance B2
Bronze	Andrei Venediktov	Cross-country skiing	Men's 30 km - long distance B3

== Athletes ==
Athletes competing for the Unified team at the 1992 Summer and 1992 Winter Paralympic Games.

Men

- Alpine skiing
  - Alexey Bargojakov
  - Ivan Chaprygin
  - Oleg Krasavin
  - Alexei Moshkine
  - Oleg Vasiljev
- Biathlon
  - Artiom Afanasiev
  - Boris Bogdanov
  - Nikolai Ilioutchenko
  - Vladimir Kolesnikov
  - Sergei Lozhkin
  - Lev Seleznev
  - Andrei Venediktov
- Cross-country skiing
  - Artiom Afanasiev
  - Boris Bogdanov
  - Nikolai Ilioutchenko
  - Vasily Koczekin
  - Vladimir Kolesnikov
  - Valeri Kupchinski
  - Sergei Lozhkin
  - Vasily Petrochuk
  - Igor Pustovit
  - Lev Seleznev
  - Andrei Venediktov

Women

- Alpine skiing
  - Zinaida Emlina
- Cross-country skiing
  - Nadezhda Chirkova
  - Alevtina Elessina
  - Olga Nazarenko
  - Lioubov Paninykh

== See also ==
- Unified Team at the Paralympics
- Unified Team at the 1992 Winter Olympics
