= 2023–24 FIS Cross-Country Continental Cup =

Discipline	Men	Women
Alpen Cup	(France) Rémi Bourdin	(Switzerland) Marina Kälin
Australia/New Zealand Cup	(Australia) Seve De Campo	(Australia) Katerina Paul
Eastern Europe Cup	(Kazakhstan) Olzhas Klimin	(Kazakhstan) Nadezhda Stepashkina
Far East Cup	(Japan) Haruki Yamashita	(Japan) Chika Kobayashi
Slavic Cup	(Slovakia) Andrej Renda	(Ukraine) Viktoriia Olekh
Scandinavian Cup	(Norway) Emil Iversen	(Norway) Silje Theodorsen
South America Cup	(Argentina) Franco Dal Farra	(Argentina) Nahiara Díaz González

Competition

The 2023–24 FIS Cross-Country Continental Cup (COC) is a season of the FIS Cross-Country Continental Cup, a series of second-level cross-country skiing competitions arranged by the International Ski Federation (FIS).

The 2023–24 Continental Cup contains nine different series of geographically restricted competitions: five in Europe, one in North America, one in South America, Asia and Oceania.

On 1 March 2022, following the 2022 Russian invasion of Ukraine, FIS decided to exclude athletes from Russia and Belarus from FIS competitions, with an immediate effect.

== Winners ==
The overall winners from the 2023–24 season's Continental Cups are rewarded a right to start in the first period in the following 2024–25 World Cup season.

Cup	Abbr.	Men			Women		
Cup	Abbr.	Winner	Second	Third	Winner	Second	Third
Alpen Cup (or OPA Cup)	OPA	(France) Rémi Bourdin	(France) Mathis Desloges	(France) Sabin Coupat	(Switzerland) Marina Kälin	(France) Clémence Didierlaurent	(France) Melissa Gal
Balkan Cup	BC						
Eastern Europe Cup	EEC	(Kazakhstan) Olzhas Klimin	(Kazakhstan) Fedor Karpov	(Kazakhstan) Nikita Gridin	(Kazakhstan) Nadezhda Stepashkina	(Kazakhstan) Kseniya Shalygina	(Kazakhstan) Anna Melnik
Far East Cup	FEC	(Japan) Haruki Yamashita	(Japan) Takatsugu Uda	(Japan) Takahiro Suzuki	(Japan) Chika Kobayashi	(Japan) Masae Tsuchiya	(Japan) Shiori Yokohama
Slavic Cup	SC	(Slovakia) Andrej Renda	(Poland) Mateusz Haratyk	(Poland) Michal Skowron	(Ukraine) Viktoriia Olekh	(Poland) Andzelika Szyszka	(Poland) Magdalena Kobielusz
Scandinavian Cup	SCAN	(Norway) Emil Iversen	(Norway) Mattis Stenshagen	(Norway) Håvard Moseby	(Norway) Silje Theodorsen	(Norway) Nora Sanness	(Norway) Sigrid Leseth Føyen
South America Cup	SAC	(Argentina) Franco Dal Farra	(Argentina) Mateo Lorenzo Sauma	(Chile) Yonathan Jesús Fernández García	(Argentina) Nahiara Díaz González	(Argentina) Agustina Groetzner Rocco	(Argentina) María Cecilia Domínguez
US Super Tour	UST						
Australia/New Zealand Cup	ANC	(Australia) Seve De Campo	(Switzerland) Lauro Brändli	(Australia) Noah Bradford	(Australia) Katerina Paul	(Australia) Darcie Morton	(Switzerland) Flavia Lindegger

== Results ==
=== Men ===
==== Alpen Cup ====
Key: C – Classic / F – Freestyle
Stage	Date	Place	Discipline	Winner	Second	Third	Details
1	8 December 2023	(Switzerland) Ulrichen/Goms	Sprint C	(France) Rémi Bourdin	(France) Victor Cullet	(France) Sabin Coupat	
2	9 December 2023	(Switzerland) Ulrichen/Goms	10 km C	(Switzerland) Jonas Baumann	(France) Rémi Bourdin	(Italy) Giandomenico Salvadori	
3	10 December 2023	(Switzerland) Ulrichen/Goms	20 km F Mst	(Switzerland) Fabrizio Albasini	(Switzerland) Antonin Savary	(Switzerland) Jonas Baumann	
4	21 December 2023	(Austria) St. Ulrich am Pillersee	Sprint F	(Italy) Martino Carollo	(France) Rémi Bourdin	(Germany) Elias Keck	
5	22 December 2023	(Austria) St. Ulrich am Pillersee	10 km C	(France) Maurice Manificat	(Italy) Dietmar Noeckler	(Switzerland) Nicola Wigger	
6	5 January 2024	(Germany) Oberwiesenthal	Sprint F	(Italy) Alessandro Chiocchetti	(Italy) Simone Mocellini	(France) Sabin Coupat	
7	6 January 2024	(Germany) Oberwiesenthal	20 km F Mst	(Italy) Simone Mocellini	(Italy) Alessandro Chiocchetti	(France) Sabin Coupat	
8	7 January 2024	(Germany) Oberwiesenthal	10 km C	(France) Mathis Desloges	(Germany) Max Goether	(France) Julien Arnaud	
9	20 January 2024	(Czech Republic) Jakuszyce	10 km F	(Italy) Mikael Abram	(Italy) Martino Carollo	(Italy) Andrea Zorzi	
10	21 January 2024	(Czech Republic) Jakuszyce	20 km C Mst	(Germany) Korbinian Heiland	(Italy) Martino Carollo	(Germany) Jakob Walther	
11	24 February 2024	(Italy) Schilpario	10 km C	(France) Rémi Bourdin	(Italy) Dietmar Noeckler	(France) Sabin Coupat	
12	25 February 2024	(Italy) Schilpario	20 km F Pur	(France) Sabin Coupat	(Switzerland) Fabrizio Albasini	(France) Mathis Desloges	
	15 March 2024	(France) Premanon	Sprint C	cancelled, moved to Toblach, Italy on the same dates			
	16 March 2024	(France) Premanon	10 km F	cancelled, moved to Toblach, Italy on the same dates			
	17 March 2024	(France) Premanon	Team Relay F	cancelled, moved to Toblach, Italy on the same dates			
13	15 March 2024	(Italy) Toblach	Sprint C	(France) Rémi Bourdin	(Italy) Giacomo Gabrielli	(Switzerland) Erwan Käser	
14	16 March 2024	(Italy) Toblach	10 km F	(Italy) Giovanni Ticco	(Italy) Giandomenico Salvadori	(Italy) Martino Carollo	
15	17 March 2024	(Italy) Toblach	Mixed Team Relay F	Italy; Giandomenico Salvadori; Giovanni Ticco; Francesca Franchi; Nadine Laurent	Italy; Luca Del Fabbro; Martino Carollo; Martina Bellini; Federica Sanfilippo	Switzerland; Candide Pralong; Pierrick Cottier; Giuliana Werro; Marina Kälin	

==== Australia/New Zealand Cup ====
Key: C – Classic / F – Freestyle
Stage	Date	Place	Discipline	Winner	Second	Third	Details
1	29 July 2023	(Australia) Perisher	Sprint C	(Australia) Seve De Campo	(Australia) Fedele De Campo	(Australia) Noah Bradford	
2	30 July 2023	(Australia) Perisher	15 km F	(Australia) Seve De Campo	(Switzerland) Lauro Brändli	(Australia) Noah Bradford	
3	19 August 2023	(Australia) Falls Creek	Sprint F	(Germany) Christian Winker	(Czech Republic) Fabian Stocek	(Australia) Jayden Spring	
4	20 August 2023	(Australia) Falls Creek	10 km C	(Germany) Christian Winker	(Czech Republic) Fabian Stocek	(Switzerland) Lauro Brändli	

==== Balkan Cup ====
Key: C – Classic / F – Freestyle
Stage	Date	Place	Discipline	Winner	Second	Third	Details
	22 January 2024	(Serbia) Zlatibor	Sprint F	cancelled			
	23 January 2024	(Serbia) Zlatibor	5 km F	cancelled			
	3 February 2024	(Greece) Pigadia	10 km F	cancelled			
	4 February 2024	(Greece) Pigadia	10 km F	cancelled			
	1 March 2024	(Croatia) Ravna Gora	Sprint F	cancelled, moved to Pokljuka, Slovenia on the same dates			
	2 March 2024	(Croatia) Ravna Gora	10 km C	cancelled, moved to Pokljuka, Slovenia on the same dates			
1	1 March 2024	(Slovenia) Pokljuka	Sprint F	(Slovakia) Denis Tilesch	(Slovenia) Nejc Štern	(Slovakia) Tomáš Cenek	
2	2 March 2024	(Slovenia) Pokljuka	10 km C	(Bulgaria) Daniel Peshkov	(Bulgaria) Mario Matikanov	(Slovakia) Denis Tilesch	
	6 March 2024	(North Macedonia) Mavrovo	7.5 km F	cancelled, moved to Pokljuka, Slovenia on the same dates			
	7 March 2024	(North Macedonia) Mavrovo	5 km F	cancelled, moved to Pokljuka, Slovenia on the same dates			
3	6 March 2024	(Slovenia) Pokljuka	7.5 km F	(Slovenia) Miha Ličef	(Bulgaria) Mario Matikanov	(Bulgaria) Daniel Peshkov	
4	8 March 2024	(Slovenia) Pokljuka	10 km F	(Bulgaria) Daniel Peshkov	(Bulgaria) Mario Matikanov	(North Macedonia) Stavre Jada	
	9 March 2024	(Bulgaria) Bansko	10 km C	cancelled			
	10 March 2024	(Bulgaria) Bansko	10 km F	cancelled			
	18 March 2024	(Romania) Cheile Gradistei-Fundata	15 km F	cancelled			
	19 March 2024	(Romania) Cheile Gradistei-Fundata	10 km C	cancelled			
	23 March 2024	(Turkey) Bolu-Gerede	10 km C	cancelled			
	24 March 2024	(Turkey) Bolu-Gerede	10 km F	cancelled			

==== Eastern Europe Cup ====
Key: C – Classic / F – Freestyle
Stage	Date	Place	Discipline	Winner	Second	Third	Details
1	8 December 2023	(Kazakhstan) Schuchinsk	Sprint C	(Kazakhstan) Ivan Lyuft	(Kazakhstan) Yernar Nursbekov	(Kazakhstan) Iliyas Issabek	
	9 December 2023	(Kazakhstan) Schuchinsk	10 km C	cancelled			
	10 December 2023	(Kazakhstan) Schuchinsk	15 km F	cancelled			
2	21 December 2023	(Kazakhstan) Schuchinsk	Sprint F	(Kazakhstan) Konstantin Bortsov	(Kazakhstan) Svyatoslav Matassov	(Kazakhstan) Vladislav Kovalyov	
	22 December 2023	(Kazakhstan) Schuchinsk	20 km F Mst	cancelled			
3	23 December 2023	(Kazakhstan) Schuchinsk	20 km F Mst	(Kazakhstan) Olzhas Klimin	(Kazakhstan) Fedor Karpov	(Kazakhstan) Nikita Gridin	
4	25 December 2023	(Kazakhstan) Schuchinsk	10 km C	(Kazakhstan) Nikita Gridin	(Kazakhstan) Fedor Karpov	(Kazakhstan) Ivan Lyuft	
5	22 March 2024	(Kazakhstan) Schuchinsk	20 km C/F Skiathlon	(Kazakhstan) Olzhas Klimin	(Kazakhstan) Nail Bashmakov	(Kazakhstan) Fedor Karpov	
6	23 March 2024	(Kazakhstan) Schuchinsk	Sprint F	(Kazakhstan) Almas Karimov	(Kazakhstan) Svyatoslav Matassov	(Kazakhstan) Olzhas Klimin	
7	26 March 2024	(Kazakhstan) Schuchinsk	10 km F	(Kazakhstan) Olzhas Klimin	(Kazakhstan) Nail Bashmakov	(Kazakhstan) Yernur Bexultan	
8	27 March 2024	(Kazakhstan) Schuchinsk	50 km C Mst	(Kazakhstan) Vladislav Kovalyov	(Kazakhstan) Didar Kassenov	(Kazakhstan) Yernur Bexultan	

==== Far East Cup ====
Key: C – Classic / F – Freestyle
Stage	Date	Place	Discipline	Winner	Second	Third
1	16 December 2023	(South Korea) Pyeongchang	10 km C	(Japan) Haruki Yamashita	(Japan) Takanori Ebina	(Japan) Masato Tanaka
2	16 December 2023	(South Korea) Pyeongchang	10 km F	(Japan) Haruki Yamashita	(Japan) Masato Tanaka	(Japan) Hyuga Otaki
3	26 December 2023	(Japan) Otoineppu	10 km C	(Japan) Haruki Yamashita	(Japan) Hyuga Otaki	(Japan) Takahiro Suzuki
4	27 December 2023	(Japan) Otoineppu	10 km F	(Japan) Haruki Yamashita	(Japan) Hyuga Otaki	(Japan) Daito Yamazaki
5	6 January 2024	(Japan) Sapporo	10 km C	(Japan) Haruki Yamashita	(Japan) Kosei Kobayashi	(Japan) Takahiro Suzuki
6	7 January 2024	(Japan) Sapporo	Sprint F	(Japan) Sho Kasahara	(Japan) Tomoki Sato	(Japan) Kosei Kobayashi
7	8 January 2024	(Japan) Sapporo	10 km F	(Japan) Takahiro Suzuki	(Japan) Masatoshi Hachisuka	(Japan) Haruki Yamashita
8	3 February 2024	(Japan) Shiramine	10 km F	(Japan) Yuito Habuki	(Japan) Hyuga Otaki	(Japan) Takatsugu Uda
9	15 February 2024	(South Korea) Pyeongchang	10 km C	(Japan) Naoto Baba	(Japan) Ryo Hirose	(Japan) Haruki Yamashita
10	16 February 2024	(South Korea) Pyeongchang	10 km F	(Japan) Naoto Baba	(Japan) Haruki Yamashita	(Japan) Ryo Hirose
11	1 March 2024	(Japan) Sapporo	10 km C	(Japan) Takatsugu Uda	(Japan) Shota Moriguchi	(Japan) Haruki Yamashita
12	2 March 2024	(Japan) Sapporo	15 km F	(Japan) Takatsugu Uda	(Japan) Kanta Sakai	(Japan) Masato Tanaka

==== Slavic Cup ====
Key: C – Classic / F – Freestyle
Stage	Date	Place	Discipline	Winner	Second	Third
1	16 December 2023	(Slovakia) Štrbské Pleso	Sprint F	(Ukraine) Dmytro Drahun	(Ukraine) Andriy Dotsenko	(Slovakia) Matej Badan
2	16 December 2023	(Slovakia) Štrbské Pleso	10 km C	(Slovakia) Andrej Renda	(Ukraine) Andriy Dotsenko	(Slovakia) Denis Tilesch
3	13 January 2024	(Poland) Wisła-Kubalonka	10 km C	(Poland) Piotr Jarecki	(Poland) Łukasz Gazurek	(Poland) Mateusz Haratyk
4	14 January 2024	(Poland) Wisła-Kubalonka	15 km F	(Poland) Piotr Jarecki	(Slovakia) Andrej Renda	(Poland) Łukasz Gazurek
5	3 February 2024	(Poland) Ptaszkowa	Sprint F	(Poland) Michal Skowron	(Poland) Mateusz Haratyk	(Poland) Piotr Sobiczewski
6	4 February 2024	(Poland) Ptaszkowa	10 km C	(Poland) Mateusz Haratyk	(Poland) Michal Skowron	(Slovakia) Andrej Renda
	9 March 2024	(Slovakia) Skalka pri Kremnici	Sprint C	cancelled		
	10 March 2024	(Slovakia) Skalka pri Kremnici	10 km F Mst	cancelled		

==== Scandinavian Cup ====
Key: C – Classic / F – Freestyle
Stage	Date	Place	Discipline	Winner	Second	Third
1	15 December 2023	(Finland) Vuokatti	Sprint F	(Norway) David Thorvik	(Norway) Sivert Wiig	(Norway) Mattis Stenshagen
2	16 December 2023	(Finland) Vuokatti	10 km C	(Norway) Mattis Stenshagen	(Norway) Håvard Moseby	(Norway) Emil Iversen
3	17 December 2023	(Finland) Vuokatti	20 km F Mst	(Norway) Mattis Stenshagen	(Norway) Håvard Moseby	(Norway) David Thorvik
4	12 January 2024	(Estonia) Otepää	Sprint C	(Finland) Ristomatti Hakola	(Norway) Emil Iversen	(Norway) Mats Opsal
5	13 January 2024	(Estonia) Otepää	20 km C	(Norway) Emil Iversen	(Norway) Mattis Stenshagen	(Finland) Ristomatti Hakola
6	14 January 2024	(Estonia) Otepää	10 km F	(Norway) Iver Tildheim Andersen	(Norway) Mattis Stenshagen	(Norway) Gjøran Tefre
7	1 March 2024	(Norway) Hommelvik	Sprint C	(Norway) Emil Iversen	(Sweden) Måns Skoglund	(Norway) Sivert Wiig
8	2 March 2024	(Norway) Hommelvik	30 km C	(Norway) Didrik Tønseth	(Norway) Andreas Fjorden Ree	(Norway) Sjur Røthe
9	3 March 2024	(Norway) Hommelvik	10 km F	(Norway) Iver Tildheim Andersen	(Norway) Gjøran Tefre	(Norway) Andreas Fjorden Ree

==== South America Cup ====
Key: C – Classic / F – Freestyle
Stage	Date	Place	Discipline	Winner	Second	Third
1	7 September 2023	(Argentina) Cerro Catedral	10 km F	(Argentina) Franco Dal Farra	(Argentina) Javier Giménez	(Argentina) Mateo Lorenzo Sauma
2	8 September 2023	(Argentina) Cerro Catedral	Sprint C	(Argentina) Franco Dal Farra	(Argentina) Mateo Lorenzo Sauma	(Chile) Martin Flores
	10 September 2023	(Argentina) Cerro Catedral	10 km C	cancelled		
3	23 September 2023	(Chile) Corralco	10 km F	(Argentina) Franco Dal Farra	(Argentina) Mateo Lorenzo Sauma	(Chile) Yonathan Jesús Fernández García
4	24 September 2023	(Chile) Corralco	Sprint F	(Argentina) Franco Dal Farra	(Argentina) Mateo Lorenzo Sauma	(Chile) Yonathan Jesús Fernández García
5	27 September 2023	(Chile) Corralco	10 km F	(Argentina) Franco Dal Farra	(Chile) Yonathan Jesús Fernández García	(Argentina) Nahuel Ezequiel Torres
6	28 September 2023	(Chile) Corralco	Sprint F	(Argentina) Franco Dal Farra	(Argentina) Mateo Lorenzo Sauma	(Chile) Martin Flores

==== US Super Tour ====
Key: C – Classic / F – Freestyle
Stage	Date	Place	Discipline	Winner	Second	Third
1	12 December 2023	(United States) Kincaid Park	Sprint F	(Canada) Julian Locke	(United States) Walker Hall	(United States) Michael Earnhart
2	13 December 2023	(United States) Kincaid Park	10 km C	(Canada) Max Hollmann	(Australia) Hugo Hinckfuss	(United States) Hunter Wonders
3	16 December 2023	(United States) Kincaid Park	Sprint C	(Canada) Julian Locke	(United States) Logan Diekmann	(United States) Reid Goble
4	17 December 2023	(United States) Kincaid Park	10 km F Mst	(United States) Michael Earnhart	(United States) Reid Goble	(Canada) Sasha Masson
5	20 January 2024	(United States) Mount Van Hoevenberg	Sprint C	(United States) Luke Jager	(United States) Michael Earnhart	(Canada) Julian Smith
6	21 January 2024	(United States) Mount Van Hoevenberg	10 km C Mst	(United States) Luke Jager	(United States) Michael Earnhart	(United States) Hunter Wonders
7	26 January 2024	(United States) Craftsbury	Sprint F	(United States) Finegan Bailey	(United States) Michael Earnhart	(Canada) Julian Smith
8	28 January 2024	(United States) Craftsbury	25 km F Mst	(United States) John Steel Hagenbuch	(United States) Michael Earnhart	(Canada) Luke Allan
9	21 March 2024	(United States) Spirit Mountain Recreation Area	10 km C	(Canada) Antoine Cyr	(United States) John Steel Hagenbuch	(United States) Zanden McMullen

=== Women ===
==== Alpen Cup ====
Key: C – Classic / F – Freestyle
Stage	Date	Place	Discipline	Winner	Second	Third
1	8 December 2023	(Switzerland) Ulrichen/Goms	Sprint C	(France) Melissa Gal	(France) Clémence Didierlaurent	(Italy) Nicole Monsorno
2	9 December 2023	(Switzerland) Ulrichen/Goms	10 km C	(France) Melissa Gal	(Switzerland) Giuliana Werro	(Italy) Martina Di Centa
3	10 December 2023	(Switzerland) Ulrichen/Goms	10 km F Mst	(France) Melissa Gal	(France) Maëlle Veyre	(Switzerland) Marina Kälin
4	21 December 2023	(Austria) St. Ulrich am Pillersee	Sprint F	(Switzerland) Alina Meier	(Switzerland) Nadja Kälin	(Italy) Nicole Monsorno
5	22 December 2023	(Austria) St. Ulrich am Pillersee	10 km C	(Switzerland) Nadja Kälin	(Italy) Iris De Martin Pinter	(Switzerland) Giuliana Werro
6	5 January 2024	(Germany) Oberwiesenthal	Sprint F	(Italy) Federica Cassol	(Germany) Anna-Maria Dietze	(Switzerland) Marina Kälin
7	6 January 2024	(Germany) Oberwiesenthal	20 km F Mst	(Germany) Helen Hoffmann	(Germany) Lena Keck	(Germany) Anna-Maria Dietze
8	7 January 2024	(Germany) Oberwiesenthal	10 km C	(Germany) Helen Hoffmann	(Estonia) Kaidy Kaasiku	(Germany) Theresa Fürstenberg
9	20 January 2024	(Czech Republic) Jakuszyce	10 km F	(Italy) Martina Bellini	(Italy) Sara Hutter	(Germany) Amelie Hofmann
10	21 January 2024	(Czech Republic) Jakuszyce	20 km C Mst	(Italy) Martina Bellini	(Germany) Theresa Fürstenberg	(Czech Republic) Barbora Havlíčková
11	24 February 2024	(Italy) Schilpario	10 km C	(Switzerland) Marina Kälin	(France) Julie Pierrel	(Germany) Helen Hoffmann
12	25 February 2024	(Italy) Schilpario	10 km F Pur	(Germany) Helen Hoffmann	(Switzerland) Marina Kälin	(Switzerland) Anja Weber
	15 March 2024	(France) Premanon	Sprint C	cancelled, moved to Toblach, Italy on the same dates		
	16 March 2024	(France) Premanon	10 km F	cancelled, moved to Toblach, Italy on the same dates		
	17 March 2024	(France) Premanon	Team Relay F	cancelled, moved to Toblach, Italy on the same dates		
13	15 March 2024	(Italy) Toblach	Sprint C	(France) Melissa Gal	(Switzerland) Marina Kälin	(France) Julie Pierrel
14	16 March 2024	(Italy) Toblach	10 km F	(Italy) Francesca Franchi	(Italy) Nadine Laurent	(Switzerland) Marina Kälin
15	17 March 2024	(Italy) Toblach	Mixed Team Relay F	Italy; Giandomenico Salvadori; Giovanni Ticco; Francesca Franchi; Nadine Laurent	Italy; Luca Del Fabbro; Martino Carollo; Martina Bellini; Federica Sanfilippo	Switzerland; Candide Pralong; Pierrick Cottier; Giuliana Werro; Marina Kälin

==== Australia/New Zealand Cup ====
Key: C – Classic / F – Freestyle
Stage	Date	Place	Discipline	Winner	Second	Third
1	29 July 2023	(Australia) Perisher	Sprint C	(Australia) Katerina Paul	(Switzerland) Fabiana Wieser	(Australia) Emily Champion
2	30 July 2023	(Australia) Perisher	15 km F	(Australia) Darcie Morton	(Australia) Katerina Paul	(Switzerland) Fabiana Wieser
3	19 August 2023	(Australia) Falls Creek	Sprint F	(Australia) Darcie Morton	(Switzerland) Flavia Lindegger	(Australia) Katerina Paul
4	20 August 2023	(Australia) Falls Creek	10 km C	(Switzerland) Flavia Lindegger	(Australia) Katerina Paul	(Australia) Darcie Morton

==== Balkan Cup ====
Key: C – Classic / F – Freestyle
Stage	Date	Place	Discipline	Winner	Second	Third	Details
	22 January 2024	(Serbia) Zlatibor	Sprint F	cancelled			
	23 January 2024	(Serbia) Zlatibor	5 km F	cancelled			
	3 February 2024	(Greece) Pigadia	10 km F	cancelled			
	4 February 2024	(Greece) Pigadia	10 km F	cancelled			
	1 March 2024	(Croatia) Ravna Gora	Sprint F	cancelled, moved to Pokljuka, Slovenia on the same dates			
	2 March 2024	(Croatia) Ravna Gora	5 km C	cancelled, moved to Pokljuka, Slovenia on the same dates			
1	1 March 2024	(Slovenia) Pokljuka	Sprint F	(Croatia) Tena Hadzic	(Slovakia) Maria Danielová	(Serbia) Anja Ilić	
2	2 March 2024	(Slovenia) Pokljuka	5 km C	(Slovenia) Neža Žerjav	(Slovakia) Maria Danielová	(Croatia) Tena Hadzic	
	6 March 2024	(North Macedonia) Mavrovo	7.5 km F	cancelled, moved to Pokljuka, Slovenia on the same dates			
	7 March 2024	(North Macedonia) Mavrovo	5 km F	cancelled, moved to Pokljuka, Slovenia on the same dates			
3	6 March 2024	(Slovenia) Pokljuka	7.5 km F	(Estonia) Kaidy Kaasiku	(Estonia) Keidy Kaasiku	(Slovenia) Neža Žerjav	
4	7 March 2024	(Slovenia) Pokljuka	5 km F	(Estonia) Kaidy Kaasiku	(Estonia) Keidy Kaasiku	(Bulgaria) Kalina Nedyalkova	
	9 March 2024	(Bulgaria) Bansko	10 km C	cancelled			
	10 March 2024	(Bulgaria) Bansko	10 km F	cancelled			
	18 March 2024	(Romania) Cheile Gradistei-Fundata	10 km F	cancelled			
	19 March 2024	(Romania) Cheile Gradistei-Fundata	5 km C	cancelled			
	23 March 2024	(Turkey) Bolu-Gerede	10 km C	cancelled			
	24 March 2024	(Turkey) Bolu-Gerede	10 km F	cancelled			

==== Eastern Europe Cup ====
Key: C – Classic / F – Freestyle
Stage	Date	Place	Discipline	Winner	Second	Third
1	8 December 2023	(Kazakhstan) Schuchinsk	Sprint C	(Kazakhstan) Angelina Shuryga	(Kazakhstan) Tamara Ebel	(Kazakhstan) Karina Boranbayeva (Kazakhstan) Viktoriya Kolesnikova
	9 December 2023	(Kazakhstan) Schuchinsk	10 km C	cancelled		
	10 December 2023	(Kazakhstan) Schuchinsk	15 km F	cancelled		
2	21 December 2023	(Kazakhstan) Schuchinsk	Sprint F	(Kazakhstan) Nadezhda Stepashkina	(Kazakhstan) Kseniya Shalygina	(Kazakhstan) Darya Ryazhko
	22 December 2023	(Kazakhstan) Schuchinsk	20 km F Mst	cancelled		
3	23 December 2023	(Kazakhstan) Schuchinsk	20 km F Mst	(Kazakhstan) Mariya Gerachshenko	(Kazakhstan) Angelina Shuryga	(Kazakhstan) Yelizaveta Tomalchyova
4	25 December 2023	(Kazakhstan) Schuchinsk	10 km C	(Kazakhstan) Anna Melnik	(Kazakhstan) Kseniya Shalygina	(Kazakhstan) Darya Ryazhko
5	22 March 2024	(Kazakhstan) Schuchinsk	10 km C/F Skiathlon	(Kazakhstan) Nadezhda Stepashkina	(Kazakhstan) Angelina Shuryga	(Kazakhstan) Aisha Rakisheva
6	23 March 2024	(Kazakhstan) Schuchinsk	Sprint F	(Kazakhstan) Darya Ryazhko	(Kazakhstan) Anna Melnik	(Kazakhstan) Aisha Rakisheva
7	25 March 2024	(Kazakhstan) Schuchinsk	5 km F	(Kazakhstan) Laura Kinybaeyeva	(Kazakhstan) Nadezhda Stepashkina	(Kazakhstan) Aisha Rakisheva
8	26 March 2024	(Kazakhstan) Schuchinsk	30 km C Mst	(Kazakhstan) Nadezhda Stepashkina	(Kazakhstan) Angelina Shuryga	(Kazakhstan) Kseniya Shalygina

==== Far East Cup ====
Key: C – Classic / F – Freestyle
Stage	Date	Place	Discipline	Winner	Second	Third
1	16 December 2023	(South Korea) Pyeongchang	5 km C	(Japan) Chika Kobayashi	(Japan) Harune Kamakura	(Japan) Takane Tochitani
2	16 December 2023	(South Korea) Pyeongchang	5 km F	(Japan) Chika Kobayashi	(Japan) Takane Tochitani	(Japan) Mayu Yamamoto
3	26 December 2023	(Japan) Otoineppu	5 km C	(Japan) Masako Ishida	(Japan) Masae Tsuchiya	(Japan) Chika Kobayashi
4	27 December 2023	(Japan) Otoineppu	5 km F	(Japan) Masae Tsuchiya	(Japan) Masako Ishida	(Japan) Chika Kobayashi
5	6 January 2024	(Japan) Sapporo	5 km C	(Japan) Chika Kobayashi	(Japan) Shiori Yokohama	(Japan) Masae Tsuchiya
6	7 January 2024	(Japan) Sapporo	Sprint F	(Japan) Masae Tsuchiya	(Japan) Masako Ishida	(Japan) Shiori Yokohama
7	8 January 2024	(Japan) Sapporo	10 km F	(Japan) Masae Tsuchiya	(Japan) Shiori Yokohama	(Japan) Chika Kobayashi
8	4 February 2024	(Japan) Shiramine	10 km F	(South Korea) Eui Jin Lee	(Japan) Chika Kobayashi	(Japan) Sayaka Yamaishi
9	15 February 2024	(South Korea) Pyeongchang	5 km C	(Japan) Chika Kobayashi	(South Korea) Eui Jin Lee	(South Korea) Sangmi Je
10	16 February 2024	(South Korea) Pyeongchang	5 km F	(Japan) Chika Kobayashi	(South Korea) Dasom Han	(South Korea) Eui Jin Lee
11	1 March 2024	(Japan) Sapporo	5 km C	(Japan) Masae Tsuchiya	(Japan) Chika Honda	(Japan) Shiori Yokohama
12	2 March 2024	(Japan) Sapporo	10 km F	(Japan) Chika Honda	(Japan) Nodoka Tochitani	(Japan) Karen Hatakeyama

==== Slavic Cup ====
Key: C – Classic / F – Freestyle
Stage	Date	Place	Discipline	Winner	Second	Third
1	16 December 2023	(Slovakia) Štrbské Pleso	Sprint F	(Ukraine) Viktoriia Olekh	(Czech Republic) Lucie Tumova	(Ukraine) Anastasiia Ivanchenko
2	16 December 2023	(Slovakia) Štrbské Pleso	10 km C	(Ukraine) Viktoriia Olekh	(Ukraine) Sofiia Shkatula	(Ukraine) Anastasiia Ivanchenko
3	13 January 2024	(Poland) Wisła-Kubalonka	10 km C	(Poland) Andzelika Szyszka	(Poland) Aleksandra Kolodziej	(Poland) Kamila Idziniak
4	14 January 2024	(Poland) Wisła-Kubalonka	15 km F	(Poland) Andzelika Szyszka	(Poland) Kamila Idziniak	(Czech Republic) Anna Milerska
5	3 February 2024	(Poland) Ptaszkowa	Sprint F	(Poland) Magdalena Kobielusz	(Poland) Andzelika Szyszka	(Ukraine) Viktoriia Olekh
6	4 February 2024	(Poland) Ptaszkowa	10 km C	(Poland) Magdalena Kobielusz	(Poland) Andzelika Szyszka	(Poland) Oliwia Busko
	9 March 2024	(Slovakia) Skalka pri Kremnici	Sprint C	cancelled		
	10 March 2024	(Slovakia) Skalka pri Kremnici	10 km F Mst	cancelled		

==== Scandinavian Cup ====
Key: C – Classic / F – Freestyle
Stage	Date	Place	Discipline	Winner	Second	Third
1	15 December 2023	(Finland) Vuokatti	Sprint F	(Sweden) Moa Hansson	(Norway) Silje Theodorsen	(Norway) Ingrid Gulbrandsen
2	16 December 2023	(Finland) Vuokatti	10 km C	(Finland) Anni Alakoski	(Norway) Silje Theodorsen	(Norway) Nora Sanness
3	17 December 2023	(Finland) Vuokatti	20 km F Mst	(Norway) Silje Theodorsen	(Norway) Nora Sanness	(Norway) Sofie Nordsveen Hustad
4	12 January 2024	(Estonia) Otepää	Sprint C	(Norway) Ane Appelkvist Stenseth	(Norway) Maria Hartz Melling	(Finland) Johanna Matintalo
5	13 January 2024	(Estonia) Otepää	20 km C	(Finland) Johanna Matintalo	(Norway) Tiril Udnes Weng	(Norway) Hedda Østberg Amundsen
6	14 January 2024	(Estonia) Otepää	10 km F	(Norway) Silje Theodorsen	(Norway) Maren Wangensteen	(Norway) Nora Sanness
7	1 March 2024	(Norway) Hommelvik	Sprint C	(Sweden) Moa Hansson	(Norway) Ane Appelkvist Stenseth	(Norway) Johanne Hauge Harviken
8	2 March 2024	(Norway) Hommelvik	30 km C	(Norway) Marie Skaanes	(Sweden) Märta Rosenberg	(Norway) Emma Kirkeberg Moerk
9	3 March 2024	(Norway) Hommelvik	10 km F	(Norway) Helene Marie Fosseholm	(Norway) Eva Ingebrigtsen	(Norway) Karoline Simpson-Larsen

==== South America Cup ====
Key: C – Classic / F – Freestyle
Stage	Date	Place	Discipline	Winner	Second	Third
1	7 September 2023	(Argentina) Cerro Catedral	5 km F	(Argentina) Nahiara Díaz González	(Argentina) María Cecilia Domínguez	(Argentina) Agustina Groetzner Rocco
2	8 September 2023	(Argentina) Cerro Catedral	Sprint C	(Argentina) Nahiara Díaz González	(Argentina) Maira Sofia Fernandez Righi	(Argentina) Agustina Groetzner Rocco
	10 September 2023	(Argentina) Cerro Catedral	5 km C	cancelled		
3	23 September 2023	(Chile) Corralco	7.5 km F	(Argentina) Nahiara Díaz González	(Argentina) María Cecilia Domínguez	(Argentina) Agustina Groetzner Rocco
4	24 September 2023	(Chile) Corralco	Sprint F	(Argentina) Nahiara Díaz González	(Argentina) Agustina Groetzner Rocco	(Argentina) Maira Sofia Fernandez Righi
5	27 September 2023	(Chile) Corralco	5 km F	(Argentina) María Cecilia Domínguez	(Argentina) Agustina Groetzner Rocco	(Argentina) Nahiara Díaz González
6	28 September 2023	(Chile) Corralco	Sprint F	(Argentina) Nahiara Díaz González	(Argentina) Agustina Groetzner Rocco	(Argentina) Maira Sofia Fernandez Righi

==== US Super Tour ====
Key: C – Classic / F – Freestyle
Stage	Date	Place	Discipline	Winner	Second	Third
1	12 December 2023	(United States) Kincaid Park	Sprint F	(United States) Samantha Smith	(Canada) Liliane Gagnon	(Germany) Anna-Maria Dietze
2	13 December 2023	(United States) Kincaid Park	10 km C	(United States) Samantha Smith	(United States) Sydney Palmer-Leger	(United States) Nina Schamberger
3	16 December 2023	(United States) Kincaid Park	Sprint C	(United States) Samantha Smith	(Estonia) Mariel Merlii Pulles	(Canada) Olivia Bouffard-Nesbitt
4	17 December 2023	(United States) Kincaid Park	10 km F Mst	(Canada) Sonjaa Schmidt	(Germany) Anna-Maria Dietze	(United States) Sydney Palmer-Leger
5	20 January 2024	(United States) Mount Van Hoevenberg	Sprint C	(United States) Renae Anderson	(United States) Michaela Keller-Miller	(United States) Margie Freed
6	21 January 2024	(United States) Mount Van Hoevenberg	10 km C Mst	(United States) Alayna Sonnesyn	(United States) Alexandra Lawson	(United States) Margie Freed
7	26 January 2024	(United States) Craftsbury	Sprint F	(United States) Alayna Sonnesyn	(United States) Lauren Jortberg	(United States) Michaela Keller-Miller
8	28 January 2024	(United States) Craftsbury	25 km F Mst	(United States) Alayna Sonnesyn	(United States) Margie Freed	(United States) Alexandra Lawson
9	21 March 2024	(United States) Spirit Mountain Recreation Area	10 km C	(United States) Novie McCabe	(United States) Sydney Palmer-Leger	(United States) Erin Bianco
