= Cross-country skiing at the 1992 Winter Paralympics =

Cross-country skiing at the V Paralympic Winter Games

Paralympic symbol (1988-1994)

Cross-country skiing at the 1992 Winter Paralympics consisted of 27 events, 19 for men and 8 for women.

== Medal table ==
Rank	Nation	Gold medal	Silver medal	Bronze medal	Total
1	Unified Team (EUN)	9	8	3	20
2	Norway (NOR)	5	5	3	13
3	Finland (FIN)	5	3	4	12
4	Germany (GER)	2	7	1	10
5	France (FRA)	2	0	4	6
6	Poland (POL)	2	0	3	5
7	United States (USA)	2	0	1	3
8	Switzerland (SUI)	0	2	1	3
9	Austria (AUT)	0	1	3	4
10	Czechoslovakia (TCH)	0	1	1	2
11	Italy (ITA)	0	0	2	2
12	Spain (ESP)	0	0	1	1
Total		27	27	27	81

== Medal summary ==
The competition events were:

- 2.5 km: - women
- 5 km: men - women
- 10 km: men - women
- 20 km: men
- 30 km: men
- 3x2.5 km relay: men
- 3x5 km relay: men
- 4x5 km relay: men

Each event had separate standing, sitting, or visually impaired classifications:

- LW2 - standing: single leg amputation above the knee
- LW3 - standing: double leg amputation below the knee, mild cerebral palsy, or equivalent impairment
- LW4 - standing: single leg amputation below the knee
- LW5/7 - standing: double arm amputation
- LW6/8 - standing: single arm amputation
- LW9 - standing: amputation or equivalent impairment of one arm and one leg
- LW 10 - sitting: paraplegia with no or some upper abdominal function and no functional sitting balance
- LW 11 - sitting: paraplegia with fair functional sitting balance
- B1 - visually impaired: no functional vision
- B2 - visually impaired: up to ca 3-5% functional vision
- B3 - visually impaired: under 10% functional vision

=== Men's events ===
Event	Class	Gold	Silver	Bronze
5 km - short distance	LW2,4	Svein Tore Fauskrud; Norway	Svein Lilleberg; Norway	Aage Joensberg; Norway
5 km - short distance	LW3,5/7,9	Jan Kolodziej; Poland	Terje Gruer; Norway	Miguel Angel Perez Tello; Spain
5 km - short distance	LW6/8	Jean-Yves Arvier; France	Jouko Grip; Finland	Andrzej Pietrzyk; Poland
5 km - short distance	LW10	Jeff Pagels; United States	Klaus Kleiser; Germany	Oliver Anthofer; Austria
5 km - short distance	LW11	Kari Joki-Erkkila; Finland	Teuvo Ojala; Finland	Knut Lundstroem; Norway
10 km - short distance	B1	Valery Kupchinski; Unified Team	Boris Bogdanov; Unified Team	Luc Sabatier; France
10 km - short distance	B2	Frank Hoefle; Germany	Vladimir Kolesnikov; Unified Team	Seleznev; Unified Team
10 km - short distance	B3	Nikolai Ilioutchenko; Unified Team	Alexander Schwarz; Germany	Robert Walsh; United States
10 km - long distance	LW6/8	Jouko Grip; Finland	Bernhard Furrer; Switzerland	Jean-Yves Arvier; France
10 km - long distance	LW10	Jeff Pagels; United States	Oliver Anthofer; Austria	Klaus Kleiser; Germany
10 km - long distance	LW11	Kari Joki-Erkkila; Finland	Knut Lundstroem; Norway	Teuvo Ojala; Finland
20 km - long distance	LW2,4	Andre Favre; France	Aage Joensberg; Norway	Kalervo Pieksaemaeki; Finland
20 km - long distance	LW3,5/7,9	Marcin Kos; Poland	Axel Hecker; Germany	Jan Kolodziej; Poland
30 km - long distance	B1	Valery Kupchinski; Unified Team	Boris Bogdanov; Unified Team	Luc Sabatier; France
30 km - long distance	B2	Frank Hoefle; Germany	Vladimir Kolesnikov; Unified Team	Lev Seleznev; Unified Team
30 km - long distance	B3	Nikolai Ilioutchenko; Unified Team	Sergei Lozhkin; Unified Team	Andrei Venediktov; Unified Team
3×2.5 km relay	LW10-11	Norway (NOR); Rolf Einar Pedersen; Magne Lunde; Olai Myklebust	Finland (FIN); Kari Joki-Erkkila; Teuvo Ojala; Raimo Peltonen	Switzerland (SUI); Franco Belletti; Heinz Frei; Walter Widmer
3×5 km relay	B1-3	Unified Team (EUN); Nikolai Ilioutchenko; Valery Kupchinski; Sergei Lozhkin	Germany (GER); Udo Hirsch; Frank Hoefle; Alexander Schwarz	France (FRA); Herve Le Moing; Luc Sabatier; Elie Zampin
4×5 km relay	LW2-9	Norway (NOR); Svein Tore Fauskrud; Terje Gruer; Aage Joensberg; Svein Lilleberg	Germany (GER); Theo Feger; Roland Gaess; Wolfgang Mahler; Reinhold Schwer	Poland (POL); Marian Damian; Jan Kolodziej; Marcin Kos; Andrzej Pietrzyk

=== Women's events ===
Event	Class	Gold	Silver	Bronze
2.5 km - short distance	LW10-11	Ragnhild Myklebust; Norway	Barbara Maier; Germany	Dorothea Agetle; Italy
5 km - short distance	B1	Olga Nazarenko; Unified Team	Pavla Valnickova; Czechoslovakia	Kirsti Pennanen; Finland
5 km - short distance	B2-3	Alevtina Yelesina; Unified Team	Nadezhda Chirkova; Unified Team	Renata Hoenisch; Austria
5 km - short distance	LW2-9	Tanja Tervonen; Finland	Siw Vestengen; Norway	Gisela Danzl; Austria
5 km - long distance	LW10-11	Ragnhild Myklebust; Norway	Barbara Maier; Germany	Dorothea Agetle; Italy
10 km - long distance	B1	Lubov Paninykii; Unified Team	Olga Nazarenko; Unified Team	Pavla Valnickova; Czechoslovakia
10 km - long distance	B2-3	Nadezhda Chirkova; Unified Team	Alevtina Yelesina; Unified Team	Kaija Tuikkanen; Finland
10 km - long distance	LW2-9	Tanja Tervonen; Finland	Theres Huser; Switzerland	Siw Vestengen; Norway

== See also ==
- Cross-country skiing at the 1992 Winter Olympics
