= Andrea Piribauer =

Austrian para-alpine skier

Sport
- Country: Austria
- Sport: Para-alpine skiing
Medal record
Paralympic Games
Bronze medal – third place	1992 Albertville	Super-G B1-3

Andrea Piribauer is an Austrian para-alpine skier. She represented Austria at the 1992 Winter Paralympics and she won the bronze medal in the Women's Super-G B1-3 event. She also competed in the Women's Giant Slalom B1-3 event where she finished in 4th place.

== See also ==
- List of Paralympic medalists in alpine skiing
