= Canada at the 1992 Winter Paralympics =

- Flag of Canada
- IPC code: CAN
- NPC: Canadian Paralympic Committee
- Website: www.paralympic.ca

in Tignes-Albertville
- Competitors: 19 in 2 sports
- Flag bearer: Phil Crew (opening)
- Medals Ranked 9th: Gold 2 Silver 4 Bronze 6 Total 12

Winter Paralympics appearances (overview)
- 1976; 1980; 1984; 1988; 1992; 1994; 1998; 2002; 2006; 2010; 2014; 2018; 2022; 2026

Canada competed at the 1992 Winter Paralympics in Tignes-Albertville, France from March 25 to April 1, 1992. Canada entered 19 athletes in two of the three disciplines at the Games; fifteen in Alpine skiing, and four in Nordic skiing (cross-country skiing).

== Medallists ==
Medal	Name	Sport	Event
Gold	Jeff Dickson	Alpine skiing	Men's slalom LW1,3,5/7,9
Gold	Caroline Viau	Alpine skiing	Women's Super-G LW5/7,6/8
Silver	Sandra Lynes	Alpine skiing	Women's downhill LW5/7,6/8
Silver	Sandra Lynes	Alpine skiing	Women's giant slalom LW5/7,6/8
Silver	Lana Spreeman	Alpine skiing	Women's Super-G LW3,4,9
Silver	Lana Spreeman	Alpine skiing	Women's slalom LW3,4,9
Bronze	Jeff Dickson	Alpine skiing	Men's downhill LW1,3,5/7,9
Bronze	Jeff Dickson	Alpine skiing	Men's Super-G LW1,3,5/7,9
Bronze	Lana Spreeman	Alpine skiing	Women's downhill LW3,4,9
Bronze	Lana Spreeman	Alpine skiing	Women's giant slalom LW3,4,9
Bronze	Caroline Viau	Alpine skiing	Women's downhill LW5/7,6/8
Bronze	Caroline Viau	Alpine skiing	Women's giant slalom LW5/7,6/8

== See also ==
- Canada at the 1992 Winter Olympics
- Canada at the Paralympics
