= Helga Knapp =

Former Austrian Paralympic alpine skier

Helga Knapp is a former Austrian Paralympic alpine skier, who represented Austria in Paralympic alpine skiing at the 1988 Winter Paralympics in Innsbruck and the 1992 Winter Paralympics in Albertville, where she won a gold medal and a bronze medal.

== Career ==
=== 1988 Winter Paralympics ===
At the 1988 Winter Paralympics in Innsbruck, Austria, Knapp missed the podium, placing 9th in the giant slalom race (with a time of 2:17.46), 4th place in the special slalom in 1:41.65 and 6th in the downhill (time 1:31.62). All races took place in the LW2 category.

=== 1992 Winter Paralympics ===
Four years later, at the 1992 Winter Paralympics in Albertville, Knapp won gold in the LW2 special slalom with a time of 1:24.49 (silver for Nadine Laurent with 1:25.90 and bronze for Roni Sasaki with 1:26.05 and the bronze in the super-G LW2 (in front of her was Roni Sasaki, gold medalist and Sarah Billmeier, the silver medalist). She also raved in the downhill; she placed 4th, behind the Americans Sarah Billmeier, Cathy Gentile-Patti and Roni Sasaki.

== Awards ==
=== Paralympics ===
==== 2 medals ====
- 1 gold (special slalom LW2 in Tignes 1992)
- 1 bronze (supergiant LW2 in Tignes 1992)
