= Barbara Jordan (skier) =

Austrian para-alpine skier

Sport
- Country: Austria
- Sport: Alpine skiing
Medal record
Paralympic Games
| Silver medal – second place | 1992 Albertville | Downhill LW3,4,9 |
| Silver medal – second place | 1992 Albertville | Giant slalom LW3,4,9 |
| Bronze medal – third place | 1992 Albertville | Slalom LW3,4,9 |

Barbara Jordan is an Austrian para-alpine skier. She represented Austria in alpine skiing at the 1992 Winter Paralympics held in Tignes and Albertville, France. She won two silver medals and one bronze medal in LW3,4,9-classification events.
