= Roni Sasaki =

American para-alpine skier

Sport
- Country: United States
- Sport: Para-alpine skiing
Medal record
Paralympic Games
Gold medal – first place	1992 Albertville	Super-G LW2
Bronze medal – third place	1992 Albertville	Downhill LW2
Bronze medal – third place	1992 Albertville	Slalom LW2

Roni Sasaki is an American para-alpine skier. She represented the United States at the 1992 Winter Paralympics in alpine skiing. She was born with one leg and she competed in LW2-classification events (for athletes with a single leg amputation above the knee).

She won the gold medal in the Women's Super-G LW2 event and the bronze medals in the Women's Downhill LW2 and Women's Slalom LW2 events.

She also competed in the Women's Giant Slalom LW2 event but did not finish.

== See also ==
- List of Paralympic medalists in alpine skiing
