= Chad Colley =

American para-alpine skier (1944–2021)

Personal information
- Born: May 13, 1944 Fort Smith, Arkansas, U.S.
- Died: January 30, 2021 (aged 76)

Sport
- Country: United States
- Sport: Para-alpine skiing
Medal record
Paralympic Games
Gold medal – first place	1992 Albertville	Downhill LW10
Gold medal – first place	1992 Albertville	Super-G LW10

Ralph C. Colley Jr. (May 13, 1944 – January 30, 2021), known as Chad Colley, was an American para-alpine skier, army officer and advocate for disabled Americans. He represented the United States at the 1992 Winter Paralympics held in Tignes and Albertville, France.

== Biography ==
Colley born in Fort Smith, Arkansas, on May 12, 1944. He was commissioned into the US Army in 1966 and served in the 101st Airborne Division during the Vietnam war. Whilst commanding an infantry company he lost both legs and his left arm in July 1968 when a landmine exploded. He was awarded the Bronze Star Medal, Silver Star and Purple Heart and left the army with the rank of captain. On his return home he entered into a career in real estate and was active in disabled veterans' affairs. President George H. W. Bush appointed him Vice Chairman of the President’s Committee on Employment of People with Disabilities and he served as National Commander of the Disabled American Veterans association. He died on January 30, 2021, at the age of 76.

== Paralympic medals ==
At the 1992 Winter Paralympics held in Tignes and Albertville, France, he won the gold medal in the Men's Downhill LW10 event and in the Men's Super-G LW10 event.

== Military awards ==
- Silver Star
- Bronze Star
- Purple Heart

== See also ==
- List of Paralympic medalists in alpine skiing
