= Poland at the 1992 Winter Paralympics =

- IPC code: POL
- NPC: Polish Paralympic Committee
- Website: www.paralympic.org.pl

in Tignes-Albertville
- Competitors: 13 in 2 sports
- Medals Ranked 10th: Gold 2 Silver 0 Bronze 3 Total 5

Winter Paralympics appearances (overview)
- 1976; 1980; 1984; 1988; 1992; 1994; 1998; 2002; 2006; 2010; 2014; 2018; 2022; 2026

Poland competed at the 1992 Winter Paralympics in Tignes/Albertville, France. 13 competitors from Poland won 5 medals, 2 gold and 3 bronze, and finished 10th in the medal table.

== Medalists ==
=== Gold ===
- Jan Kołodziej - Cross-country skiing, Standing 5 km Individual Classic LW3/5/7/9
- Marcin Kos - Cross-country skiing, Standing 20 km Individual Free LW3/5/7/9

=== Bronze ===
- Jan Kołodziej - Cross-country skiing, Standing 20 km Individual Free LW3/5/7/9
- Andrzej Pietrzyk - Cross-country skiing, Standing 5 km Individual Classic LW6/8
- Jan Kołodziej, Marian Damian, Marcin Kos, Andrzej Pietrzyk - Cross-country skiing, Standing 4 x 5 km Relay LW2-9

== Alpine skiing ==
Athlete	Event	Final			
Athlete	Event	Run	Rank	Calculated Time	Rank
Urszula Bojda	Giant slalom LW5/7,6/8	DNF		DNF	
Urszula Bojda	Downhill LW5/7,6/8	DNF		DNF	
Elżbieta Dadok	Slalom LW5/7,6/8	1:31.84	5	1:31.84	5
Elżbieta Dadok	Giant slalom LW5/7,6/8	2:29.19	6	2:29.19	6
Elżbieta Dadok	Super gigant LW5/7,6/8	1:25.21	4	1:25.21	4
Elżbieta Dadok	Downhill LW5/7,6/8	1:21.79	6	1:21.79	6
Janusz Hojka	Slalom LW4	DNF		DNF	
Janusz Hojka	Giant slalom LW4	2:57.91	10	2:57.91	10
Janusz Hojka	Downhill LW4	1:22.09	12	1:22.09	12
Bogdan Kawka	Slalom LW6/8	1:39.14	11	1:39.14	11
Bogdan Kawka	Giant slalom LW6/8	DNF		DNF	
Bogdan Kawka	Downhill LW6/8	1:23.48	15	1:23.48	15
Janusz Wasil	Slalom LW4	2:02.61	15	2:02.61	15
Janusz Wasil	Giant slalom LW4	DNF		DNF	
Janusz Wasil	Downhill LW4	1:23.13	15	1:23.13	15

== Cross‑country skiing ==
Athlete	Event	Final	
Athlete	Event	Finish Time	Rank
Jarosław Dąbrowski	Standing 5 km Classic LW2/4	19:45.2	15
Jarosław Dąbrowski	Standing 20 km Free LW2/4	1:22:25.0	12
Marian Damian	Standing 5 km Classic LW6/8	18:19.2	9
Marian Damian	Standing 20 km Free LW6/8	1:06:05.3	8
Jan Kołodziej	Standing 5 km Classic LW3/5/7/9	17:17.6	1st place, gold medalist(s)
Jan Kołodziej	Standing 20 km Free LW3/5/7/9	1:09:55.9	3rd place, bronze medalist(s)
Marcin Kos	Standing 5 km Classic LW3/5/7/9	DNF	
Marcin Kos	Standing 20 km Free LW3/5/7/9	1:02:31.8	1st place, gold medalist(s)
Andrzej Pietrzyk	Standing 5 km Classic LW6/8	16:54.2	3rd place, bronze medalist(s)
Andrzej Pietrzyk	Standing 20 km Free LW6/8	1:01:00.4	6
Piotr Sulkowski	Standing 5 km Classic LW2/4	19:19.3	14
Piotr Sulkowski	Standing 20 km Free LW3/5/7/9	1:18:31.0	8
Jerzy Szlezak	Standing 5 km Classic LW3/5/7/9	19:27.6	4
Jerzy Szlezak	Standing 20 km Free LW3/5/7/9	1:17:22.3	7
Jerzy Slazyk	Standing 10 km Classic B3	37:41.9	15
Jerzy Slazyk	Standing 30 km Free B3	1:42:17.5	13
Jan Kołodziej; Marian Damian; Marcin Kos; Andrzej Pietrzyk	4 x 5 km Relay Standing LW2-9	1:11:33.9	3rd place, bronze medalist(s)

== See also ==
- Poland at the Paralympics
- Poland at the 1992 Winter Olympics
