= Czechoslovakia at the Paralympics =

- IPC code: TCH
- Medals: Gold 7 Silver 10 Bronze 10 Total 27

Summer appearances
- 1972; 1976; 1980; 1984; 1988; 1992

Winter appearances
- 1976; 1980; 1984; 1988; 1992

Other related appearances
- Czech Republic (1994–pres.); Slovakia (1994–pres.)

Czechoslovakia made its Paralympic Games début at the 1972 Summer Paralympics in Heidelberg, where it was one of just four Eastern Bloc nations competing (the other three being Hungary, Poland and Romania). Czechoslovakia sent a delegation of nineteen athletes, who all competed in track and field, and won a single bronze medal in the shot put.

The country's participation in the Summer Paralympics was sporadic. It missed the 1976 Games, sent a delegation of seven athletes to the 1980 Summer Paralympics in Arnhem, missed the 1984 Games, then competed in 1988 and 1992, before its dissolution in 1993. At the Winter Paralympics, however, Czechoslovakia took part in the inaugural Games in Örnsköldsvik in 1976 (with a delegation of five athletes), and participated in every edition of the Games until its dissolution. Since 1994, the Czech Republic and Slovakia have competed separately.

During their nine participations in the Paralympics, Czechoslovaks won a total of 27 medals - seven gold, ten silver and ten bronze. Thus the country ranks fifty-fourth on the all-time Paralympic Games medal table (behind both of its successor states).

Only four Czechoslovaks have won gold medals at the Paralympic Games. Eva Lemezová is the country's most successful Paralympian, having won three gold medals in women's alpine skiing in 1976, as well as a silver in 1980. Pavla Valníčková won two gold medals in track events in 1992, as well as a bronze, and a bronze and a silver in cross-country skiing that same year. Miloslava Běhalová won a gold in the discus in 1992, and Vojtěch Vašíček is Czechoslovakia's only male Paralympic champion, having won the pentathlon in 1992.

== Medallists ==
Medal	Name	Games	Sport	Event
Gold	Eva Lemežová	1976 Örnsköldsvik	Alpine skiing	Women's alpine combination III
Gold	Eva Lemežová	1976 Örnsköldsvik	Alpine skiing	Women's giant slalom III
Gold	Eva Lemežová	1976 Örnsköldsvik	Alpine skiing	Women's slalom III
Gold	Miloslava Běhalová	1992 Barcelona	Athletics	Women's discus throw THW4
Gold	Pavla Valníčková	1992 Barcelona	Athletics	Women's 1500 metres B1
Gold	Pavla Valníčková	1992 Barcelona	Athletics	Women's 3000 metres B1
Gold	Vojtěch Vašíček	1992 Barcelona	Athletics	Men's pentathlon PW3-4
Silver	Roman Gronský	1980 Arnhem	Swimming	Men's 100 metre butterfly D
Silver	Eva Lemežová	1980 Geilo	Alpine skiing	Women's slalom 3A
Silver	Josef Lachman	1988 Seoul	Cycling	Men's 60 km LC3
Silver	Věra Jirásková	1992 Barcelona	Athletics	Women's discus throw THW5
Silver	Anton Sluka	1992 Barcelona	Athletics	Men's marathon B3
Silver	Lubomír Šimovec	1992 Barcelona	Cycling	Men's road race LC2
Silver	Marcela Mišunová	1992 Tignes-Albertville	Alpine skiing	Women's super-G LW5/7,6/8
Silver	Kateřina Teplá	1992 Tignes-Albertville	Alpine skiing	Women's giant slalom B1-3
Silver	Kateřina Teplá	1992 Tignes-Albertville	Alpine skiing	Women's super-G B1-3
Silver	Pavla Valníčková	1992 Tignes-Albertville	Cross-country skiing	Women's short distance 5 km B1
Bronze	Dana Véleová-Chmelová	1972 Heidelberg	Athletics	Women's shot put 1B
Bronze	Roman Gronský	1980 Arnhem	Swimming	Men's 4x50 metre individual medley D
Bronze	Štefan Bogdan	1992 Barcelona	Athletics	Men's javelin THW4
Bronze	František Gödri	1992 Barcelona	Athletics	Men's pentathlon B2
Bronze	Dušan Leipert	1992 Barcelona	Athletics	Men's discus THS4
Bronze	Pavla Valníčková	1992 Barcelona	Athletics	Women's 800 metres B1
Bronze	Pavla Zemanová	1992 Barcelona	Athletics	Women's long jump B3
Bronze	team	1992 Barcelona	Volleyball	Men's standing
Bronze	Marcela Mišunová	1992 Tignes-Albertville	Alpine skiing	Women's slalom LW5/7,6/8
Bronze	Pavla Valníčková	1992 Tignes-Albertville	Cross-country skiing	Women's long distance 10 km B1

== See also ==
- Czechoslovakia at the Olympics
