= Czechoslovakia at the 1988 Winter Paralympics =

- IPC code: TCH
- Competitors: 1 (0 men and 1 woman) in 1 sport and 2 events
- Medals: Gold 0 Silver 0 Bronze 0 Total 0

Winter Paralympics appearances (overview)
- 1976; 1980; 1984; 1988; 1992

Other related appearances
- Czech Republic (1994–pres.); Slovakia (1994–pres.)

Czechoslovakia competed at the 1988 Winter Paralympics in Innsbruck, Austria.

== Cross-country ==
Pavla Valnickova competed in the Women's Short Distance 5 km B1 and Women's Short Distance 10 km B1 events. She did not win any medals. She finished in 7th and 8th place respectively.

== See also ==
- Czechoslovakia at the Paralympics
- Czechoslovakia at the 1988 Winter Olympics
