= Abdullah Yılmaz (skier, born 2004) =

Turkish cross-country skier (born 2004)

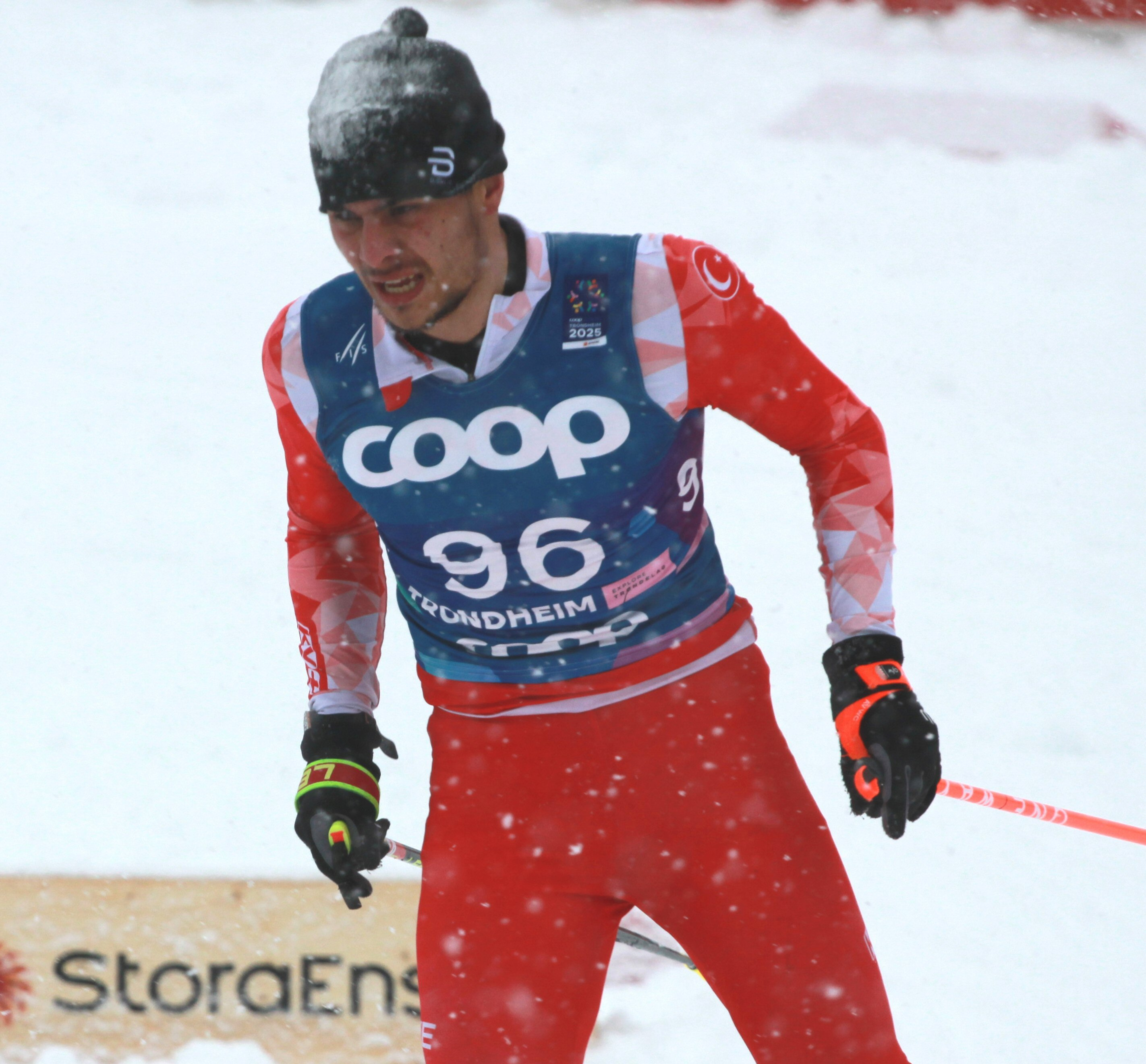
- Abdullah Yılmaz ( Trondheim 2025)

Personal information
- Nationality: Turkey
- Born: 19 August 2004 (age 21) Gerede, Bolu, Turkey

Sport
- Sport: Cross-country skiing

Abdullah Yılmaz (born 19 August 2004) is a Turkish Olympian cross-country skier.

== Sport career ==
=== 2022 ===
Yılmaz debuted internationally in January 2022 at the Junior Championships in Aasen, Norway competing in the 15 km interval start classic event. The next month, he competed in the interval start classic events of 10 km and 15 km at the Norway National Junior Championships in Nes Skianlegg. He competed in the 7.5 lm interval start classic, 10 km interval start free and 1.1. km sprint free events at the 2022 European Youth Olympic Winter Festival in Vuokatti, Finland.

=== 2023 ===
In 2023, Yılmaz competed in various cross-country skiing events at the FIS Junior World Ski Championships in Whistler, Canada, Junior Championships in Voss and Alta, Norway, Balkan Cup in Gerede, Bolu, Turkey and Norway National Chaöpionships in Tolga

=== 2024 ===
He took part at the World Junior Championships Sprint Qualification in Planica, Slovenia, FIS Turkey Tournament in Gerede, Bolu, where he finished the 10 km interval start classic event as champion, and FIS Norway Tournament in Gålå.

=== 2025 ===
Yılmaz competed in 2025 at the U23 Sprint Qualification in Schilpario, Italy. In March 2025, he participated in the 10 km classical of the cross-country skiing event at the FIS Nordic World Ski Championships in Trondheim, Norway. He further took part at the Roller Ski in Cheile Grădiștei-Fundata and Predeal, Romania, FESA Cup in Planica, Slovenia and FIS Germany Tournament in Seefeld.

=== 2026 ===
He is to represent his country in the 10 km freestyle and sprint events of cross-country skiing at the 2026 Winter Olympics in Milan-Cortina, Italy.

== Personal life ==
Abdullah Yılmaz was born in Gerede District of Bolu, Turkey on 19 August 2004.
