= 1992 Paralympics =

1992 Paralympics may refer to:

- 1992 Summer Paralympics
- 1992 Winter Paralympics
