= Maria Sund =

Swedish paralympian

Sport
- Country: Sweden
- Sport: Alpine skiing
Medal record
Alpine skiing
Representing Sweden
Paralympic Games
Silver medal – second place	1992 Albertville	Slalom LW5/7, 6/8

Maria Sund is a Swedish paralympic alpine skier. She represented Sweden at the 1992 Winter Paralympic Games. She won a silver medal.

== Career ==
At the 1992 Winter Paralympic Games., she won a silver medal in Women's Slalom LW5/7,6/8. She competed in Women's Downhill LW5/7,6/8 finishing fifth, Women's Giant Slalom LW5/7,6/8 finishing seventh, and Women's Super-G LW5/7,6/8.
