= Rik Heid =

American para-alpine skier

Sport
- Country: United States
- Sport: Alpine skiing
Medal record
Paralympic Games
Bronze medal – third place	1988 Innsbruck	Slalom LW4
Bronze medal – third place	1988 Innsbruck	Downhill LW4
Bronze medal – third place	1992 Albertville	Downhill LW4
Silver medal – second place	1992 Albertville	Giant Slalom LW4
Silver medal – second place	1992 Albertville	Slalom LW4
Silver medal – second place	1992 Albertville	Super-G LW4
Silver medal – second place	1994 Lillehammer	Super-G LW4
Silver medal – second place	1994 Lillehammer	Slalom LW4
Gold medal – first place	1994 Lillehammer	Giant Slalom LW4
Gold medal – first place	1994 Lillehammer	Downhill LW4

Rik Heid is an American para-alpine skier. He represented the United States at the Winter Paralympics in 1988, 1992 and 1994. In total he won two gold medals, five silver medals and three bronze medals.

== Achievements ==
Year	Competition	Location	Position	Event	Time
1988	1988 Winter Paralympics	Innsbruck, Austria	3rd	Men's Slalom LW4	1:20.32
1988	1988 Winter Paralympics	Innsbruck, Austria	3rd	Men's Downhill LW4	1:13.78
1992	1992 Winter Paralympics	Tignes / Albertville, France	3rd	Men's Downhill LW4	1:09.35
1992	1992 Winter Paralympics	Tignes / Albertville, France	2nd	Men's Giant Slalom LW4	2:13.83
1992	1992 Winter Paralympics	Tignes / Albertville, France	2nd	Men's Slalom LW4	1:17.94
1992	1992 Winter Paralympics	Tignes / Albertville, France	2nd	Men's Super-G LW4	1:19.08
1994	1994 Winter Paralympics	Lillehammer, Norway	2nd	Men's Super-G LW4	1:13.78
1994	1994 Winter Paralympics	Lillehammer, Norway	2nd	Men's Slalom LW4	1:22.59
1994	1994 Winter Paralympics	Lillehammer, Norway	1st	Men's Giant Slalom LW4	2:15.46
1994	1994 Winter Paralympics	Lillehammer, Norway	1st	Men's Downhill LW4	1:12.39

== See also ==
- List of Paralympic medalists in alpine skiing
