= Wilfried Maetzler =

Austrian para-alpine skier

Sport
- Country: Austria
- Sport: Para-alpine skiing
Medal record
Paralympic Games
Bronze medal – third place	1992 Albertville	Giant Slalom LW4

Wilfried Maetzler is an Austrian para-alpine skier. He represented Austria at the 1988 Winter Paralympics, at the 1992 Winter Paralympics and at the 1994 Winter Paralympics. He won the bronze medal in the Men's Giant Slalom LW4 event in the 1992 Winter Paralympics.

== See also ==
- List of Paralympic medalists in alpine skiing
