= Czechoslovakia at the 1984 Winter Paralympics =

- IPC code: TCH

in Innsbruck
- Competitors: 2 in 1 sport
- Medals Ranked 15th: Gold 0 Silver 0 Bronze 0 Total 0

Winter Paralympics appearances (overview)
- 1976; 1980; 1984; 1988; 1992

Other related appearances
- Czech Republic (1994–pres.); Slovakia (1994–pres.)

Czechoslovakia sent a delegation to compete at the 1984 Winter Paralympics, in Innsbruck, Austria.

Czechoslovakia did not win any medals.

== Classification ==
Each event had separate standing, sitting, or visually impaired classifications:

- LW2 - standing: single leg amputation above the knee
- LW 3 - standing: double leg amputation below the knee, mild cerebral palsy, or equivalent impairment
- LW4 - standing: single leg amputation below the knee
- LW5/7 - standing: double arm amputation
- LW6/8 - standing: single arm amputation
- LW9 - standing: amputation or equivalent impairment of one arm and one leg
- B1 - visually impaired: no functional vision
- B2 - visually impaired: up to ca 3-5% functional vision

== Alpine skiing ==
Women

Athlete	Event	Run 1 (SG)			Run 2 (Sl)			Final/Total		
Athlete	Event	Time	Diff	Rank	Time	Diff	Rank	Time	Diff	Rank
Eva Prihodova	Giant slalom, LW6/8		+			+			+	
Eva Prihodova	Slalom, LW6/8		+			+			+	
Eva Prihodova	Alpine combination, LW6/8		+			+			+	
Eva Prihodova	Downhill, LW6/8		+			+			+	

Men

Athlete	Event	Run 1 (SG)			Run 2 (Sl)			Final/Total		
Athlete	Event	Time	Diff	Rank	Time	Diff	Rank	Time	Diff	Rank
Peter Matiasko	Giant slalom, LW2		+			+			+	
Peter Matiasko	Slalom, LW2		+			+			+	
Peter Matiasko	Alpine combination, LW2		+			+			+	
Peter Matiasko	Downhill, LW2		+			+			+	

== See also ==
- Czechoslovakia at the 1984 Winter Olympics
- Czechoslovakia at the Paralympics
