= Alevtina Yelesina =

Russian Paralympic cross-country skier (1954–2026)

- Yelesina in 2014

Personal information
- Born: 22 August 1954 Aleksandrovskoye, Mozhginsky District, Udmurt ASSR, Russian SFSR, USSR
- Died: 19 March 2026 (aged 71)

Sport
- Country: Russia
- Sport: Cross-country skiing
Medal record
Representing Unified Team
Paralympic Games
Cross-country skiing
| Gold medal – first place | 1992 Tignes / Albertville | Women's 5 km short distance B2-3 |
| Silver medal – second place | 1992 Tignes / Albertville | Women's 10 km long distance B2-3 |
Representing Russia
Paralympic Games
Cross-country skiing
| Gold medal – first place | 1994 Lillehammer | Women's 5 km free technique B3 |
| Silver medal – second place | 1994 Lillehammer | Women's 5 km classical technique B3 |
| Silver medal – second place | 1994 Lillehammer | Women's 10 km classical technique B3 |
| Bronze medal – third place | 1994 Lillehammer | Women's 3×2.5 km relay B3 |

Alevtina Aleksandrovna Yelesina (Russian: Алевтина Александровна Елесина; 22 August 1954 – 19 March 2026) was a Russian paralympic cross-country skier. She competed at the 1992 and 1994 Winter Paralympics.

== Life and career ==
Yelesina was born in Aleksandrovskoye, Mozhginsky District. She was legally blind. She attended and graduated from the Verkhnyaya Pyshma School.

She competed at the 1992 Winter Paralympics, winning the gold and silver medal in cross-country skiing. She then competed at the 1994 Winter Paralympics, winning two silver medals, a gold medal and a bronze medal in cross-country skiing. After competing at the Paralympics, in 1994, she was awarded the Order "For Personal Courage" by President Boris Yeltsin.

== Death ==
Yelesina died on 19 March 2026, at the age of 71.
