= Caroline Viau =

Canadian para-alpine skier

Personal information
- Born: 29 October 1971 (age 54)

Sport
- Country: Canada
- Sport: Para-alpine skiing
Medal record
Representing Canada
Paralympic Games
Gold medal – first place	1992 Albertville	Super-G LW5/7,6/8
Bronze medal – third place	1992 Albertville	Downhill LW5/7,6/8
Bronze medal – third place	1992 Albertville	Giant Slalom LW5/7,6/8

Caroline Viau (born 29 October 1971) is a Canadian para-alpine skier. She represented Canada at the 1992 Winter Paralympics. In total, she won one gold medal and two bronze medals.

She won the gold medal in the Women's Super-G LW5/7,6/8 event and the bronze medals in the Women's Downhill LW5/7,6/8, and Women's Giant Slalom LW5/7,6/8 events.

She was awarded the Queen Elizabeth II Diamond Jubilee Medal in 2013.

In 2017, Viau hosted the Opening Ceremony of the 2017 VISTA Conference in Toronto, Canada alongside Paralympian, Rob Snoek.

== Achievements ==
Year	Competition	Location	Position	Event	Time
1992	Winter Paralympics	Tignes-Albertville, France	1st	Women's Super-G LW5/7,6/8	1:17.70
1992	Winter Paralympics	Tignes-Albertville, France	3rd	Women's Downhill LW5/7,6/8	1:14.42
1992	Winter Paralympics	Tignes-Albertville, France	3rd	Women's Giant Slalom LW5/7,6/8	2:20.28

== See also ==
- List of Paralympic medalists in alpine skiing
