= Czechoslovakia at the 1980 Winter Paralympics =

- Flag of Czechoslovakia
- IPC code: TCH
- Competitors: 3 (2 men and 1 woman) in 1 sport and 6 events
- Medals Ranked 10th: Gold 0 Silver 1 Bronze 0 Total 1

Winter Paralympics appearances (overview)
- 1976; 1980; 1984; 1988; 1992

Other related appearances
- Czech Republic (1994–pres.); Slovakia (1994–pres.)

Czechoslovakia competed at the 1980 Winter Paralympics in Geilo, Norway. Three competitors from Czechoslovakia won one silver medal and finished 10th in the medal table.

== Alpine skiing ==
Eva Lemežová-Příhodová won the silver medal in the Women's Slalom 3A event. She also competed at the Women's Giant Slalom 3A and finished 4th.

Jaroslav Pauer competed in the Men's Giant Slalom 1A and Men's Slalom 1A events.

Pavel Teplý competed in the Men's Giant Slalom 3A and Men's Slalom 3A events.

== See also ==
- Czechoslovakia at the Paralympics
- Czechoslovakia at the 1980 Winter Olympics
