= Nadine Laurent =

French Paralympic alpine skier

Personal information
- Born: 1959 (age 66–67) Lyon, France

Sport
- Country: France
- Sport: Alpine skiing
Medal record
Alpine skiing
Representing France
Paralympic Games
Silver medal – second place	1992 Albertville	Slalom LW2
Bronze medal – third place	1992 Albertville	Giant slalom LW2

Nadine Laurent is a French Paralympic alpine skier. She won a silver and a bronze medal at the 1992 Winter Paralympic Games in Albertville.

== Career ==
At the 1992 Winter Paralympics, in Tignes / Albertville, France, she won two medals: a silver medal in the slalom (with a time of 1:25.90 (gold for Austrian athlete Helga Knapp in 1: 24.49 and bronze for Cathy Gentile-Patti in 2: 23.51), and a bronze in the giant slalom in 2:31.80 (finishing behind the American athletes Sarah Billmeier in 2: 22.85 and Cathy Gentile-Patti in 2:23.51).

Laurent placed sixth in the downhill, and fifth in the super-G, in the LW2 category.

At the 1994 Winter Paralympics, in Lillehammer, Norway, Laurent missed the podium, finishing 4th in giant slalom LW2, 6th in downhill LW2, and 7th in super-G LW2.
