= Cross-country skiing at the 2022 European Youth Olympic Winter Festival =

- Venue: Vuokatti Sport Biathlon Stadium
- Date: 21–25 March
- Website: eyof2022.fi

Cross-country skiing at the 2022 European Youth Olympic Winter Festival was held from 21 to 25 March at Vuokatti Sport Biathlon Stadium in Vuokatti, Finland.

== Competition schedule ==
Date	Time	Event
21 March	14:00	Girls' 7.5 km freestyle
21 March	15:25	Boys' 10 km freestyle
22 March	10:00	Girls' 5 km classical
22 March	11:25	Boys' 7.5 km classical
24 March	10:00	Girls' sprint freestyle
24 March	10:30	Boys' sprint freestyle
25 March	10:30	Mixed 4 x 5 km relay
Source: All times are (UTC+2)

== Medal summary ==
=== Medal table ===
* Host nation (Finland)

Rank	Nation	Gold	Silver	Bronze	Total
1	Sweden (SWE)	3	3	3	9
2	Finland (FIN)*	2	1	1	4
3	Italy (ITA)	1	1	3	5
4	Latvia (LAT)	1	0	0	1
5	Czech Republic (CZE)	0	1	0	1
5	Switzerland (SUI)	0	1	0	1
Totals (6 entries)		7	7	7	21

=== Boys' events ===
Event	Gold		Silver		Bronze	
10 km freestyle	Niko Anttola; Finland	21:08.7	Niclas Steiger; Switzerland	21:29.3	Elias Danielsson; Sweden	21:33.2
7.5 km classical	Niko Anttola; Finland	19:40.0	Jiří Tuž; Czech Republic	19:50.6	Elias Danielsson; Sweden	19:55.4
Sprint	Lauris Kaparkalējs; Latvia	2:00.03	Ike Melnits; Finland	2:00.43	Ludvig Berg; Sweden	2:01.09

=== Girls' events ===
Event	Gold		Silver		Bronze	
7.5 km freestyle	Lisa Eriksson; Sweden	20:46.9	Tove Ericsson; Sweden	21:17.1	Nadine Laurent; Italy	21:38.2
5 km classical	Iris De Martin Pinter; Italy	14:24.9	Lisa Eriksson; Sweden	14:31.5	Nadine Laurent; Italy	14:40.9
Sprint	Tove Ericsson; Sweden	2:17.01	Elin Näslund; Sweden	2:17.07	Iris De Martin Pinter; Italy	2:17.15

=== Mixed event ===
Event	Gold		Silver		Bronze	
Mixed 4 x 5 km relay	Sweden; Jens Junes; Tove Ericsson; Elias Danielsson; Lisa Eriksson	55:27.8	Italy; Davide Ghio; Iris De Martin Pinter; Hannes Oberhofer; Nadine Laurent	55:42.4	Finland; Ike Melnits; Elsa Torvinen; Niko Anttola; Fanny Kukonlehto	56:27.8
