= Czech Republic at the 2002 Winter Paralympics =

- IPC code: CZE
- NPC: Czech Paralympic Committee
- Website: www.paralympic.cz

in Salt Lake City
- Competitors: 6 in 2 sports
- Flag bearer: Kateřina Teplá
- Medals Ranked 14th: Gold 2 Silver 1 Bronze 2 Total 5

Winter Paralympics appearances (overview)
- 1994; 1998; 2002; 2006; 2010; 2014; 2018; 2022; 2026

Other related appearances
- Czechoslovakia (1976–1992)

Czech Republic competed at the 2002 Winter Paralympics in Salt Lake City, United States. 6 competitors from Czech Republic won 5 medals including 2 gold, 1 silver and 2 bronze and finished 14th in the medal table.

== Medalists ==
Medal	Name	Sport	Event
Gold	Kateřina Teplá	Alpine skiing	Women's super-G B2-3
Gold	Kateřina Teplá	Alpine skiing	Women's giant slalom B2-3
Silver	Kateřina Teplá	Alpine skiing	Women's downhill B2-3
Bronze	Sabina Rogie	Alpine skiing	Women's giant slalom B2-3
Bronze	Sabina Rogie	Alpine skiing	Women's slalom B2-3

== Competitors ==
The following is the list of number of competitors participating at the Games per sport/discipline.

Sport	Men	Women	Total
Alpine skiing	2	3	5
Cross-country skiing	0	1	1
Total	3	3	6

== Alpine skiing ==
5 athletes competed in alpine skiing.

Men

Athlete	Events	Final		
Athlete	Events	Real time	Calculated time	Rank
Stanislav Loska	Men's downhill LW6/8	1:27.37	1:27.37	9
Stanislav Loska	Men's super-G LW6/8	1:16.93	1:16.93	4
Stanislav Loska	Men's giant slalom LW6/8	2:20.21	2:20.21	7
Stanislav Loska	Men's slalom LW6/8	1:36.13	1:35.08	6
Michal Nevrkla	Men's downhill LW2	1:37.55	1:32.33	16
Michal Nevrkla	Men's super-G LW2	1:27.99	1:21.07	10
Michal Nevrkla	Men's giant slalom LW2	2:38.78	2:26.44	8
Michal Nevrkla	Men's slalom LW2	DNF		

Women

Athlete	Events	Final		
Athlete	Events	Real time	Calculated time	Rank
Kateřina Teplá; Guide: Renáta Karamanová	Women's Downhill B2-3	1:35.98	1:26.73	Silver medal
Kateřina Teplá; Guide: Renáta Karamanová	Women's Super-G B2-3	1:23.85	1:15.60	Gold medal
Kateřina Teplá; Guide: Renáta Karamanová	Women's giant slalom B2-3	2:34.60	2:20.25	Gold medal
Kateřina Teplá; Guide: Renáta Karamanová	Women's slalom B2-3	DNF		
Sabina Rogie; Guide: Michal Karásek	Women's Super-G B2-3	1:36.39	1:26.91	5
Sabina Rogie; Guide: Michal Karásek	Women's giant slalom B2-3	2:51.98	2:36.01	Bronze medal
Sabina Rogie; Guide: Michal Karásek	Women's slalom B2-3	2:15.81	2:01.30	Bronze medal
Klára Bechová; Guide: Tomáš Vyskočil	Women's Downhill B2-3	2:07.13	1:54.87	8
Klára Bechová; Guide: Tomáš Vyskočil	Women's Super-G B2-3	1:47.39	1:36.83	7
Klára Bechová; Guide: Tomáš Vyskočil	Women's giant slalom B2-3	3:22.74	3:03.92	6
Klára Bechová; Guide: Tomáš Vyskočil	Women's slalom B2-3	2:36.96	2:20.19	6

== Cross-country skiing ==
1 athlete competed in cross-country skiing.

Women

Athlete	Events	Final	
Athlete	Events	Time	Rank
Miroslava Sedláčková; Guide: Petr Jakl	Women's 5 km classical technique B2-3	18:02.80	9
Miroslava Sedláčková; Guide: Petr Jakl	Women's 10 km free technique B1-2	34:01.70	5
Miroslava Sedláčková; Guide: Petr Jakl	Women's 15 km Free Technique Visually impaired	57:51.90	10

== See also ==
- Czech Republic at the Paralympics
- Czech Republic at the 2002 Winter Olympics
