= Biathlon at the 1992 Winter Paralympics =

Biathlon at the V Paralympic Winter Games

Paralympic symbol (1988-1994)

Biathlon at the 1992 Winter Paralympics consisted of four events for men.

== Medal table ==
Rank	Nation	Gold medal	Silver medal	Bronze medal	Total
1	Finland (FIN)	2	0	0	2
2	Germany (GER)	1	3	2	6
3	Unified Team (EUN)	1	0	0	1
4	Switzerland (SUI)	0	1	1	2
5	Sweden (SWE)	0	0	1	1
Total		4	4	4	12

== Medal summary ==
The competition event was:

- 7.5 km: men

The event had separate standing, or visually impaired classifications:

- LW2 - standing: single leg amputation above the knee
- LW4 - standing: single leg amputation below the knee
- LW6/8 - standing: single arm amputation
- B1 - visually impaired: no functional vision
- B2 - visually impaired: up to ca 3-5% functional vision
- B3 - visually impaired: under 10% functional vision

Event	Class	Gold	Silver	Bronze
Men's 7.5 km	B1	Boris Bogdanov; Unified Team	Udo Hirsch; Germany	Hans-Peter Schmid; Switzerland
Men's 7.5 km	B2-3	Frank Höfle; Germany	Alexander Schwarz; Germany	Torbjörn Ek; Sweden
Men's 7.5 km	LW2,4	Kalervo Pieksämäki; Finland	Wolfgang Mahler; Germany	Roland Gäss; Germany
Men's 7.5 km	LW6/8	Jouko Grip; Finland	Bernhard Furrer; Switzerland	Josef Gattinger; Germany

== See also ==
- Biathlon at the 1992 Winter Olympics
