= Sandra Lynes =

Canadian para-alpine skier

Sport
- Country: Canada
- Sport: Para-alpine skiing
Medal record
Paralympic Games
| Silver medal – second place | 1992 Albertville | Downhill LW5/7,6/8 |
| Silver medal – second place | 1992 Albertville | Giant Slalom LW5/7,6/8 |

Sandra Lynes is a Canadian para-alpine skier. She represented Canada at the 1992 Winter Paralympics and at the 1994 Winter Paralympics.

At 1992 Winter Paralympics, she won the silver medals in the Women's Downhill LW5/7,6/8 and the Women's Giant Slalom LW5/7,6/8 events.

At the 1994 Lillehammer Winter Paralympic Games in Norway, Lynes placed 5th in the LW6 / 8 giant slalom, and 4th in two other races: downhill, and super-G, category LW6 / 8. In the Slalom LW6/8, she did not finish.

== See also ==
- List of Paralympic medalists in alpine skiing
