= Germany at the 1992 Winter Paralympics =

- IPC code: GER
- NPC: National Paralympic Committee Germany
- Website: www.dbs-npc.de (in German)

in Tignes-Albertville
- Competitors: 36
- Medals Ranked 2nd: Gold 12 Silver 17 Bronze 9 Total 38

Winter Paralympics appearances (overview)
- 1976; 1980; 1984; 1988; 1992; 1994; 1998; 2002; 2006; 2010; 2014; 2018; 2022; 2026

Germany competed at the 1992 Winter Paralympics in Tignes/Albertville, France. 36 competitors from Germany won 38 medals including 12 gold, 17 silver and 9 bronze and finished 2nd in the medal table.

== Medalists ==
Medal	Name	Sport	Event
Gold	Gerd Schönfelder	Alpine skiing	Men's downhill LW1,3,5/7,9
Gold	Alexander Spitz	Alpine skiing	Men's giant slalom LW2
Gold	Gerd Schönfelder	Alpine skiing	Men's giant slalom LW1,3,5/7,9
Gold	Gerd Schönfelder	Alpine skiing	Men's super-G LW1,3,5/7,9
Gold	Reinhild Möller	Alpine skiing	Women's downhill LW3,4,9
Gold	Reinhild Möller	Alpine skiing	Women's giant slalom LW3,4,9
Gold	Reinhild Möller	Alpine skiing	Women's super-G LW3,4,9
Gold	Reinhild Möller	Alpine skiing	Women's slalom LW3,4,9
Gold	Gerda Pamler	Alpine skiing	Women's slalom LW10-11
Gold	Frank Höfle	Biathlon	Men's 7.5 kilometres B2-3#
Gold	Frank Höfle	Cross-country skiing	Men's 30 kilometres B2
Gold	Frank Höfle	Cross-country skiing	Men's 10 kilometres B2
Silver	Gerda Pamler	Alpine skiing	Women's super-G LW10-11
Silver	Markus Pfefferle	Alpine skiing	Men's downhill LW6/8
Silver	Markus Pfefferle	Alpine skiing	Men's giant slalom LW6/8
Silver	Eberhard Seischab	Alpine skiing	Men's giant slalom LW1,3,5/7,9
Silver	Frank Pfortmüller	Alpine skiing	Men's super-G LW6/8
Silver	Markus Pfefferle	Alpine skiing	Men's slalom LW6/8
Silver	Gerda Pamler	Alpine skiing	Women's downhill LW10-11
Silver	Gerda Pamler	Alpine skiing	Women's super-G LW10-11
Silver	Wolfgang Mahler	Biathlon	Men's 7.5 kilometres LW2,4
Silver	Udo Hirsch	Biathlon	Men's 7.5 kilometres B1
Silver	Alexander Schwarz	Biathlon	Men's 7.5 kilometres B2-3
Silver	Axel Hacker	Cross-country skiing	Men's 20 kilometres LW3,5/7,9
Silver	Frank Höfle; Udo Hirsch; Alexander Schwarz	Cross-country skiing	Men's 3 × 5 kilometres relay B1-3
Silver	Theo Feger; Roland Gäss; Wolfgang Mahler; Reinhold Schwer	Cross-country skiing	Men's 4 × 5 kilometres relay LW2-9
Silver	Klaus Kleiser	Cross-country skiing	Men's 5 kilometres LW10
Silver	Alexander Schwarz	Cross-country skiing	Men's 10 kilometres B3
Silver	Barbara Maier	Cross-country skiing	Women's 5 kilometres LW10-11
Silver	Barbara Maier	Cross-country skiing	Women's 2.5 kilometres LW10-11
Bronze	Alexander Spitz	Alpine skiing	Men's downhill LW2
Bronze	Karl Lotz	Alpine skiing	Men's giant slalom LW11
Bronze	Alexander Spitz	Alpine skiing	Men's super-G LW2
Bronze	Markus Pfefferle	Alpine skiing	Men's super-G LW6/8
Bronze	Ewald Vogl	Alpine skiing	Men's slalom LW4
Bronze	Dagmar Vollmer	Alpine skiing	Women's super-G LW5/7,6/8
Bronze	Roland Gäss	Biathlon	Men's 7.5 kilometres LW2,4
Bronze	Josef Gattinger	Biathlon	Men's 7.5 kilometres LW6/8
Bronze	Klaus Kleiser	Cross-country skiing	Men's 10 kilometres LW10

== See also ==
- Germany at the Paralympics
- Germany at the 1992 Winter Olympics
