= Frank Höfle =

German biathlete and cross-country skier

Personal information
- Nationality: German
- Born: 22 November 1967 (age 58) Brackenheim, Baden-Württemberg, West Germany
- Years active: 1984–2010
- Height: 1.81 m (5 ft 11 in)
- Weight: 67 kg (148 lb)

Sport
- Country: Germany
- Sport: Biathlon, cross-country skiing, cycling
- Disability class: B2
Medal record
Men's cross-country skiing
Representing West Germany
Winter Paralympics
Gold medal – first place	1988 Innsbruck	15 km short distance B2
Gold medal – first place	1988 Innsbruck	30 km long distance B2
Representing Germany
Winter Paralympics
Gold medal – first place	1992 Albertville/Tignes	10 km short distance B2
Gold medal – first place	1992 Albertville/Tignes	30 km long distance B2
Gold medal – first place	1994 Lillehammer	5 km classical B2
Gold medal – first place	1994 Lillehammer	10 km free B2
Gold medal – first place	1994 Lillehammer	20 km classical B2
Gold medal – first place	1998 Nagano	5 km classical B2
Gold medal – first place	2002 Salt Lake City	5 km classical B2
Gold medal – first place	2002 Salt Lake City	10 km free B2
Silver medal – second place	1992 Albertville/Tignes	3×5 km relay B1-3
Silver medal – second place	1994 Lillehammer	4×5 km relay B1-3
Silver medal – second place	1998 Nagano	15 km free B2
Silver medal – second place	1998 Nagano	4×5 km relay
Silver medal – second place	2006 Turin	5 km short distance B1-3
Bronze medal – third place	1998 Nagano	20 km classical B1-3
Bronze medal – third place	2002 Salt Lake City	20 km free B1-3
Men's biathlon
Representing Germany
Winter Paralympics
Gold medal – first place	1992 Albertville/Tignes	7.5 km B2-3
Gold medal – first place	1994 Lillehammer	7.5 km free B2
Gold medal – first place	1998 Nagano	7.5 km free B2
Bronze medal – third place	2002 Salt Lake City	7.5 km free B2
Men's cycling
Representing Germany
Summer Paralympics
Gold medal – first place	1992 Barcelona	Tandem open
Bronze medal – third place	1992 Barcelona	Team time trial
Bronze medal – third place	1996 Atlanta	100/120k tandem open

Frank Höfle (also spelled Hoefle, born 22 November 1967) is a disabled German biathlete and cross-country skier. He first participated in the Winter Paralympic Games in 1984 and won his first medal, a gold, in 1988. He has competed in every Winter Paralympics since then until 2010, winning a total of 21 medals, 13 of them gold. He has competed in cycling at the Summer Paralympics twice, in 1992 and 1996, and won an additional one gold and two bronze medals.

== See also ==
- Athletes with most gold medals in one event at the Paralympic Games
