= Shannon Bloedel =

American Paralympian sit-skier

- Born: c.1960
- Education: University of Washington
- Occupation: rehabilitation counselor
- Known for: Paralympic silver Sit-skiing medalist and model

Shannon Bloedel was an American Paralympian sit-skier. She won an Olympic silver medal in the 1992 Paralympics. Bloedel then became a model for Nordstrom.

== Description ==
Bloedel was the last of ten Catholic children when she was born in about 1960. Her mother was a nurse and her father was a doctor. The family were keen on waterskiing.

An accident when she was aged ten when her minibike had a collision with a car. The accident left Bloedel without the use of her legs so she had a wheelchair at Wilson High in Tacoma. At school she was keen on sport including tennis, swimming, javelin and weightlifting and at home her brothers would pull her along in a toboggan through the snow. She decided to ski whilst attending the University of Washington where she studied for a degree in social work and a master's in rehabilitation therapy. She was recruited by a ski instructor at the campus.

She joined the national team in 1987. She won gold medals at the National Championships in the US and Canada in 1991. At the 1992 Winter Paralympics Bloedel took a silver medal at Albertville in the Giant Slalom coming second to Marit Ruth whose time was 2:36:78. Teammate Candace Cable of the USA came third.

Bloedel did some modelling of clothes. She became pregnant and retired from skiing to live with husband and children in Seattle. In 2016 she was inducted into the North-West Ski Hall of Fame. The others honoured were Judy Nagel Johnson, Nobi Kano and Lenore Lyle.
