= Marit Ruth =

Paralympic gold medalist and company CEO

Marit Sundin
- Born: Marit Ruth; 1973 (age 52–53); Hedemora Municipality, Sweden
- Known for: Sit-skiing and developing a Segway PT based transport

Marit Sundin (née Marit Ruth; born in 1973) is a Swedish former Paralympic sit-skier and gold medalist in the 1992 Winter Paralympics. She created a company to build her own design of a two-wheeled wheelchair based on a Segway.

== Skiing career ==
Ruth was born in Hedemora Municipality in 1973. She had both her legs amputated at the age of three due to an accident with a lorry. At the age of 12, she decided that she wanted to ski and contacted Ecke Lindgren, who constructed a sit-ski for her.

She achieved a major success at the 1990 World Championships where she took all five gold medals at Winter Park in Colorado. After this win, a charity was set up in her name to support athletes from her municipality.

At the 1992 Winter Paralympics she took a gold medal at Albertville in the Giant Slalom; her time of 2:36:78 beat Shannon Bloedel and Candace Cable of the US. Ruth then hurt her back and did no further events. She subsequently retired from competitive skiing.

== Wheelchair development ==
Ruth, who took the name of Marit Sundin, lived in Åre and had to rely on her car for transport, particularly for skiing as there was no good snow locally. Sundin experimented with Segways. She ordered a type of Segway that allowed the rider to sit. However this design depended on the transfer of weight to slow down and Sundin could not achieve this, so the device was difficult to stop. She devised a new, Segway-based chair in which the chair is mounted on rails. This new design allows the rider to rapidly transfer their weight and therefore control the vehicle.

Sundin started a company in 2011 to market her idea for the Segway-based vehicle. The new company is called AddMovement and she is the CEO.
