= Alpine skiing at the 1988 Winter Paralympics – Men's slalom LW4 =

Men's slalom LW4 at the IV Paralympic Winter Games
- Paralympic Alpine Skiing
- Venue: Innsbruck
- Dates: January 1988
- Competitors: 20 from 12 nations

Medalists
1st place, gold medalist(s)		Paul Fournier	Switzerland
2nd place, silver medalist(s)		Patrick Cooper	New Zealand
3rd place, bronze medalist(s)		Rik Heid	United States

The men's slalom LW4 was one of the events held in Alpine skiing at the 1988 Winter Paralympics in Innsbruck.

There were 20 competitors in the final.

Switzerland's Paul Fournier set a time of 1:16.42, taking the gold medal.

== Results ==
=== Final ===
Rank	Athlete	Time
1st place, gold medalist(s)	Paul Fournier (SUI)	1:16.42
2nd place, silver medalist(s)	Patrick Cooper (NZL)	1:18.23
3rd place, bronze medalist(s)	Rik Heid (USA)	1:20.32
4	Herbert Speiser (FRG)	1:21.12
5	Jim Tulberg (USA)	1:21.88
6	Ryan Seibel (CAN)	1:24.65
7	Yoshimi Harada (JPN)	1:36.93
8	Al Heaver (CAN)	1:39.96
9	Markus Ramsauer (AUT)	1:40.02
10	Hans Burn (SUI)	1:50.56
11	Alessandro Malagnini (ITA)	1:55.38
12	Roberto Bondurri (ITA)	2:00.12
13	Javier Pascual (ESP)	2:08.39
	Livio Morosi (ITA)	DNS
	Kyrra Grunnsund (AUS)	DNF
	Ewald Vogl (FRG)	DNF
	Ove Joergensen (NOR)	DNF
	Knut Krems (AUT)	DNF
	Josef Meusberger (AUT)	DSQ
	Bill Hovanic (USA)	DSQ
