= 1992 Winter Paralympics medal table =

1992 Winter Paralympics medals
- Location: Albertville and Tignes, France

Highlights
- Most gold medals: United States (20)
- Most total medals: United States (45)
- Medalling NPCs: 19

The 1992 Winter Paralympics medal table is a list of National Paralympic Committees (NPCs) ranked by the number of gold medals won by their athletes during the 1992 Winter Paralympics, held in Albertville and Tignes, France, from March 25 to April 1, 1992.

== Medal table ==
The ranking in this table is based on information provided by the International Paralympic Committee (IPC) and is consistent with IPC convention in its published medal tables. By default, the table is ordered by the number of gold medals the athletes from a nation have won (in this context, a "nation" is an entity represented by a National Paralympic Committee). The number of silver medals is taken into consideration next and then the number of bronze medals. If nations are still tied, equal ranking is given and they are listed alphabetically by IPC country code.

To sort this table by nation, total medal count, or any other column, click on the icon next to the column title.

* Host nation (France)

Rank	Nation	Gold	Silver	Bronze	Total
1	United States	20	16	9	45
2	Germany	12	17	9	38
3	Unified Team	10	8	3	21
4	Austria	8	3	9	20
5	Finland	7	3	4	14
6	France*	6	4	9	19
7	Norway	5	5	4	14
8	Switzerland	3	8	4	15
9	Canada	2	4	6	12
10	Poland	2	0	3	5
11	New Zealand	2	0	0	2
12	Australia	1	1	2	4
12	Sweden	1	1	2	4
14	Czechoslovakia	0	4	2	6
15	Great Britain	0	1	4	5
16	Italy	0	1	3	4
16	Spain	0	1	3	4
18	Denmark	0	1	0	1
19	Japan	0	0	2	2
Totals (19 entries)		79	78	78	235

== See also ==
- 1992 Winter Olympics medal table
