= Lana Spreeman =

Canadian para-alpine skier (1955–2016)

Personal information
- Nationality: Canadian
- Born: August 9, 1955 Olds, Alberta
- Died: November 29, 2016 (aged 61) Calgary, Alberta

Sport
- Country: Canada
- Sport: Alpine skiing
- Coached by: Butch Boutry & Gary Aiken
- Retired: Yes

Achievements and titles
- Paralympic finals: 1980, 1984, 1988, 1992, 1994
Medal record
Women's Paralympic Alpine skiing
Gold medal – first place	1980 Geilo	Giant slalom 2A
Silver medal – second place	1984 Innsbruck	Downhill LW4
Silver medal – second place	1984 Innabruck	Giant slalom
Silver medal – second place	1988 Innsbruck	Slalom LW4
Silver medal – second place	1992 Tignes-Albertville	Super-G LW3,4,9
Silver medal – second place	1992 Tignes-Albertville	Slalom LW3,4,9
Silver medal – second place	1994 Lillehammer	Slalom LW3/4
Bronze medal – third place	1988 Innsbruck	Downhill LW4
Bronze medal – third place	1992 Tignes-Albertville	Downhill LW3,4,9
Bronze medal – third place	1992 Tignes-Albertville	Giant slalom LW3,4,9
Bronze medal – third place	1994 Lillehammer	Downhill LW3/4
Bronze medal – third place	1994 Lillehammer	Super-G LW3/4
Bronze medal – third place	1994 Lillehammer	Giant slalom LW3/4

Lana Spreeman (August 9, 1955 – November 29, 2016) was a Canadian athlete, who competed in alpine skiing at five Winter Paralympic Games. In her career, she won 13 medals for Canada, making her Canada's most decorated Winter Paralympian until passed by cross country skier Brian McKeever, who earned his 14th medal at the 2018 Winter Paralympics.

She won the first ever gold medal for Giant slalom 2A at the 1980 Winter Paralympics. At the 1994 Winter Paralympics in Lillehammer, she was the Canadian flag bearer at the closing ceremonies.

Spreeman died of brain cancer at the age of 61.
