= Sarah Billmeier =

American para-alpine skier

Sport
- Country: United States
- Sport: Para-alpine skiing
Medal record
Paralympic Games
Silver medal – second place	1992 Albertville	Super-G LW2
Gold medal – first place	1992 Albertville	Giant Slalom LW2
Gold medal – first place	1992 Albertville	Downhill LW2
Silver medal – second place	1994 Lillehammer	Slalom LW2
Gold medal – first place	1994 Lillehammer	Super-G LW2
Gold medal – first place	1994 Lillehammer	Downhill LW2
Gold medal – first place	1998 Nagano	Slalom LW2
Silver medal – second place	1998 Nagano	Super-G LW2
Bronze medal – third place	1998 Nagano	Giant Slalom LW2
Gold medal – first place	1998 Nagano	Downhill LW2
Silver medal – second place	2002 Salt Lake City	Slalom LW2
Gold medal – first place	2002 Salt Lake City	Super-G LW2
Silver medal – second place	2002 Salt Lake City	Downhill LW2

Sarah Billmeier is an American para-alpine skier. She represented the United States in alpine skiing at the 1992, 1994, 1998 and 2002 Winter Paralympics. In total she won seven gold medals, five silver medals and one bronze medal.

She competed in LW2 events for athletes with a single leg amputation above the knee. She lost her left leg above the knee to bone cancer when she was five years old.

== Achievements ==
Year	Competition	Location	Position	Event	Time
1992	1992 Winter Paralympics	Tignes/Albertville, France	2nd	Women's Super-G LW2	1:20.98
1992	1992 Winter Paralympics	Tignes/Albertville, France	1st	Women's Giant Slalom LW2	2:22.85
1992	1992 Winter Paralympics	Tignes/Albertville, France	1st	Women's Downhill LW2	1:17.85
1994	1994 Winter Paralympics	Lillehammer, Norway	2nd	Women's Slalom LW2	1:33.22
1994	1994 Winter Paralympics	Lillehammer, Norway	1st	Women's Super-G LW2	1:18.36
1994	1994 Winter Paralympics	Lillehammer, Norway	1st	Women's Downhill LW2	1:17.77
1998	1998 Winter Paralympics	Nagano, Japan	1st	Women's Slalom LW2	2:04.99
1998	1998 Winter Paralympics	Nagano, Japan	2nd	Women's Super-G LW2	1:09.04
1998	1998 Winter Paralympics	Nagano, Japan	3rd	Women's Giant Slalom LW2	2:49.44
1998	1998 Winter Paralympics	Nagano, Japan	1st	Women's Downhill LW2	1:14.79
2002	2002 Winter Paralympics	Salt Lake City, United States	2nd	Women's Slalom LW2	1:51.90
2002	2002 Winter Paralympics	Salt Lake City, United States	1st	Women's Super-G LW2	1:18.43
2002	2002 Winter Paralympics	Salt Lake City, United States	2nd	Women's Downhill LW2	1:28.50

== See also ==
- List of Paralympic medalists in alpine skiing
