= Cathy Gentile-Patti =

American para-alpine skier

Sport
- Country: United States
- Sport: Para-alpine skiing
Medal record
Paralympic Games
| Silver medal – second place | 1992 Albertville | Downhill LW2 |
| Silver medal – second place | 1992 Albertville | Giant slalom LW2 |

Cathy Gentile-Patti is an American para-alpine skier. She represented the United States in alpine skiing at the 1992 Winter Paralympics held in Tignes and Albertville, France.

She competed in LW2 events for athletes with a single leg amputation above the knee. She won the silver medal in the women's Downhill LW2 event and the women's giant slalom LW2 event.

== Early life and education ==
On June 28, 1962, Cathy Gentile was born in Los Angeles, California. When Gentile had bone cancer at the age of nine, her right leg had to be removed. During high school, Gentile was an executive for Amputees in Motion and met people with amputations as an Orthopaedic Hospital volunteer. During the early 1980s, Gentile continued to volunteer with Orthopaedic Hospital and worked at a prosthetics manufacturer. In 1983, Gentile was selected to work on a proposed project to provide disabled skiing therapy for patients at the Orthopaedic Hospital.

== Career ==
In disabled ski championships, Gentile finished second at the women's giant slalom event for above the knee amputees at the 1980 Canadian Disabled Ski Championships. During the 1984 National Handicapped Ski Championships, Gentile was second in the women's LW-2 downhill event. During the 1989 National Alpine Disabled Ski Championships, Gentile was second in both the giant slalom and super-G events for the women's LW2 division. While competing at the 1989 Disabled Ski championship, Gentile was disqualified in the slalom event. At the 1990 World Disabled Ski Championships, Gentile won gold in the women's combined and downhill events for above knee amputees.

At the 1988 Winter Paralympics as a LW2 competitor, Gentile was fifth in the downhill and sixth in the giant slalom. In the slalom, Gentitle was disqualified at the 1988 Paralympic event. For the 1988 Winter Olympics, Gentile initially did not receive a spot for the disabled giant slalom event as she finished below the five qualifiers at the World Championship that year. After one of the skiers dropped out before the Olympic event, Gentile was chosen to fill in the vacant spot. Gentile won a silver medal in the giant slalom competition when disabled skiing was an Olympic demonstration sport.
