= Czechoslovakia at the 1992 Winter Paralympics =

- IPC code: TCH

in Tignes-Albertville
- Competitors: 16
- Medals Ranked 14th: Gold 0 Silver 4 Bronze 2 Total 6

Winter Paralympics appearances (overview)
- 1976; 1980; 1984; 1988; 1992

Other related appearances
- Czech Republic (1994–pres.); Slovakia (1994–pres.)

Czechoslovakia competed at the 1992 Winter Paralympics in Tignes/Albertville, France. 16 competitors from Czechoslovakia won 6 medals, 4 silver and 2 bronze, and finished 14th in the medal table.

== See also ==
- Czechoslovakia at the Paralympics
- Czechoslovakia at the 1992 Winter Olympics
