= Vojtěch Vašíček =

Czech Paralympic athlete and table tennis player (1956–2024)

Personal information
- Born: 5 April 1956 Hodonín, Czechoslovakia
- Died: November 2024 (aged 68)

Sport
- Country: Czechoslovakia; Czech Republic
- Sport: Para-athletics; Table tennis
Medal record
Representing Czechoslovakia
Para-athletics
Paralympic Games
| Gold medal – first place | 1992 Barcelona | Men's pentathlon PW3–4 |

Vojtěch Vašíček (5 April 1956 – November 2024) was a Czech paralympic athlete and table tennis player. He competed at the 1992 and 1996 Summer Paralympics.

== Life and career ==
Vašíček was born in Hodonín on 5 April 1956. He was an electrician. At the age of 18, he cracked three vertebrae and severed his spinal cord in a motorcycle accident. After his injuries, he devoted himself to compete at the Summer Paralympic Games.

Vašíček competed at the 1992 Summer Paralympics, winning the gold medal in the men's pentathlon PW3–4 event. He also competed in two events at the 1996 Summer Paralympics.

== Death ==
Vašíček died in November 2024, at the age of 68.
