= Takahiro Suzuki =

Japanese baseball player (born 1978)

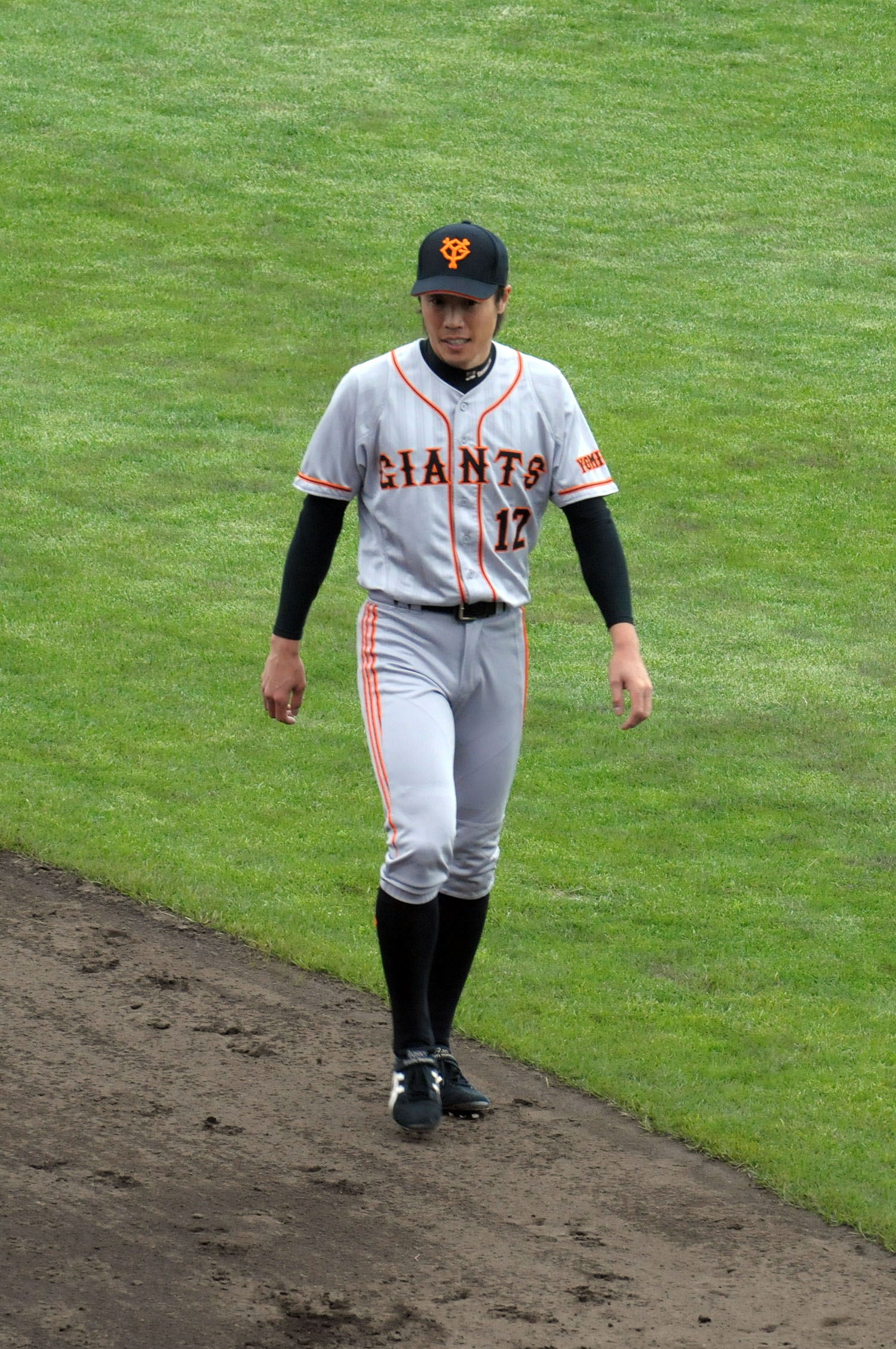
- Suzuki with the Yomiuri Giants

Yomiuri Giants – No. 82
- Outfielder / Coach
- Born: April 27, 1978 (age 48); Sōma, Fukushima
- Batted: Switch Threw: Right

NPB debut
- 2002, for the Yomiuri Giants

Last NPB appearance
- 2016, for the Yomiuri Giants

NPB statistics (through 2016)
- Batting average: .265
- Hits: 355
- RBIs: 75
- Stats at Baseball Reference

Teams
- As player: Yomiuri Giants (1997–2016); As coach: Yomiuri Giants (2019, 2023- )

Career highlights and awards
- 2× Japan Series Champion (2009, 2012)
- Last updated on: 24 December 2022

Takahiro Suzuki (鈴木 尚広, Suzuki Takahiro; born April 27, 1978 in Sōma, Fukushima) is a Japanese retired Nippon Professional Baseball player.

After leaving his professional career, he worked as a baseball commentator and also was engaged in farming.
