= Ptaszkowa =

- Village
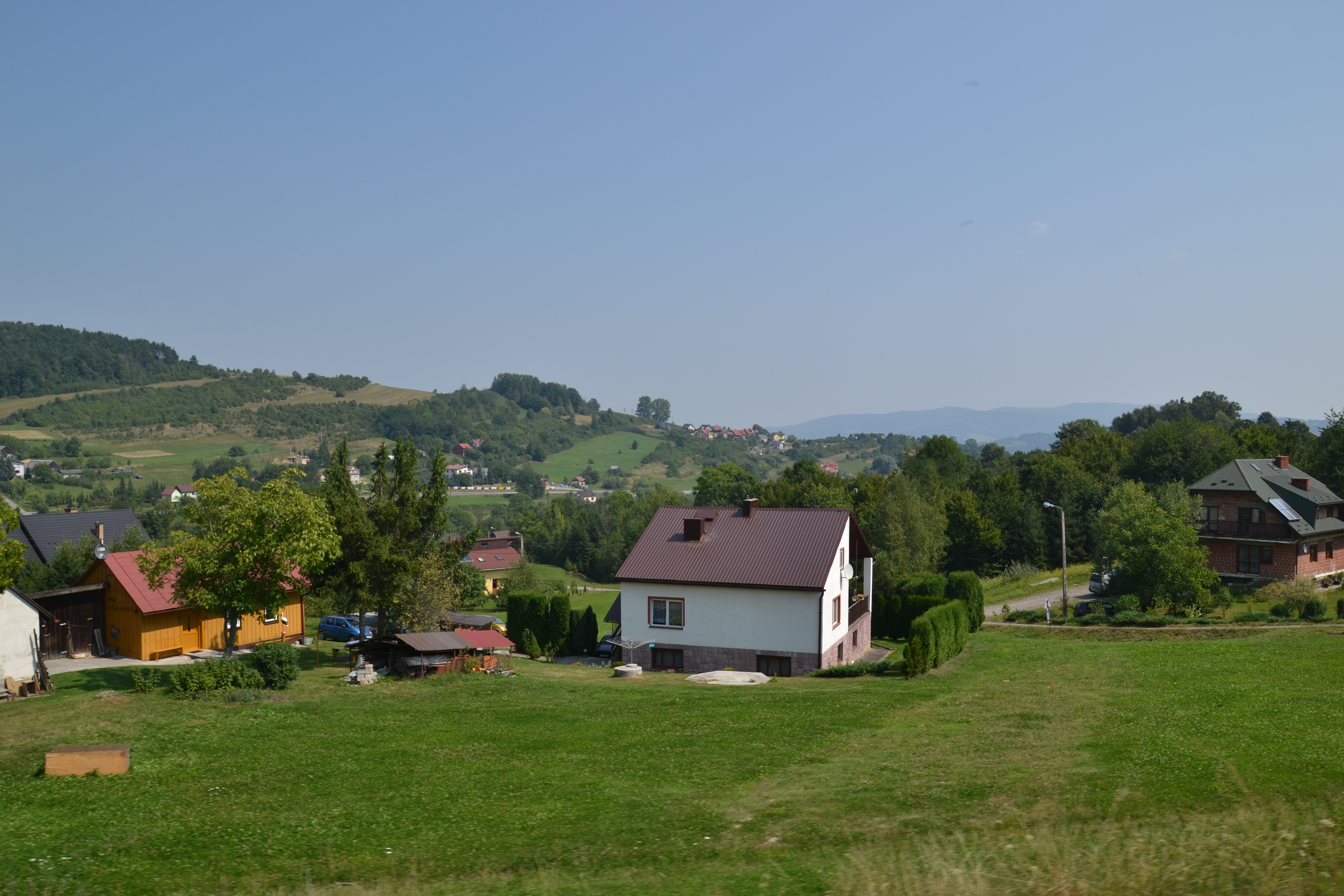

- Location within Poland
- Coordinates: 49°36′7″N 20°53′9″E
- Country: Poland
- Voivodeship: Lesser Poland
- County: Nowy Sącz
- Gmina: Grybów
- Population: 3,004
- Website: http://www.ptaszkowa.pl

Ptaszkowa [ptaʂˈkɔva] is a village in the administrative district of Gmina Grybów, within Nowy Sącz County, Lesser Poland Voivodeship, in southern Poland.
