= Norway at the 1992 Winter Paralympics =

- IPC code: NOR
- NPC: Norwegian Olympic and Paralympic Committee and Confederation of Sports
- Website: www.idrett.no (in Norwegian)

in Tignes-Albertville
- Competitors: 23
- Medals Ranked 7th: Gold 5 Silver 5 Bronze 4 Total 14

Winter Paralympics appearances (overview)
- 1976; 1980; 1984; 1988; 1992; 1994; 1998; 2002; 2006; 2010; 2014; 2018; 2022; 2026

Norway competed at the 1992 Winter Paralympics in Tignes/Albertville, France. 23 competitors from Norway won 14 medals including 5 gold, 5 silver and 4 bronze and finished 7th in the medal table.

== See also ==
- Norway at the Paralympics
- Norway at the 1992 Winter Olympics
