= Iris De Martin Pinter =

Italian cross-country skier (born 2004)

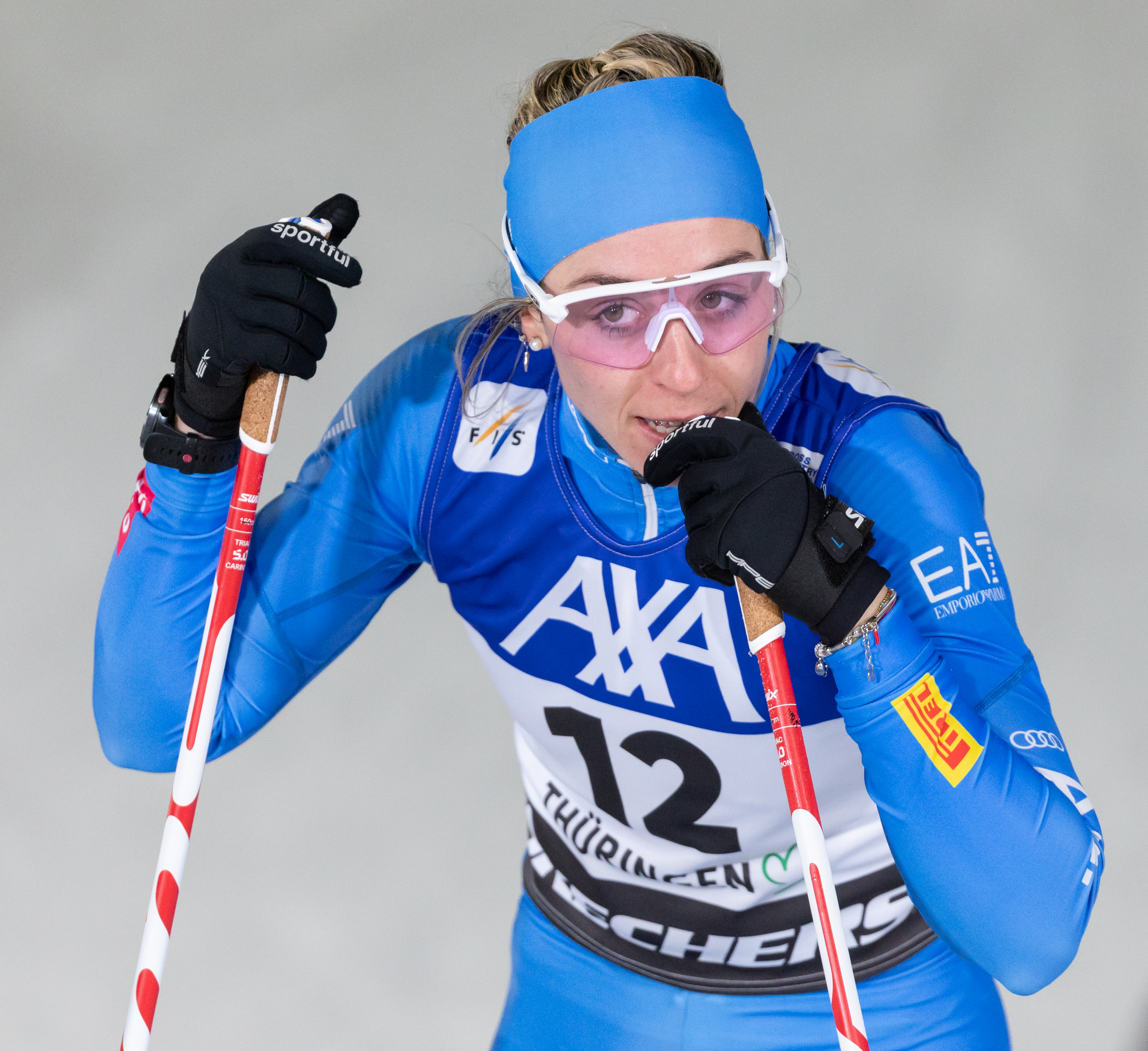

Personal information
- Nationality: Italy
- Born: 2 August 2004 (age 21) Innichen, Italy

Sport
- Sport: Skiing
- Club: CS Carabinieri
- Updated on 28 December 2025

Iris De Martin Pinter (born 2 August 2004) is an Italian cross-country skier and participant in the FIS Cross-Country World Cup.

== Career ==
De Martin Pinter represented Italy at the 2020 Winter Youth Olympics. There, she came 20th in the cross-country cross, 42nd in the sprint and 43rd in the 5 km classic. She participated in the 2021 Junior World Ski Championships, and came 19th in the sprint and 40th in the 5 km free technique. In the relay, Italy came 12th.

At the 2022 Junior World Ski Championships in Lygnasæter, Norway, De Martin Pinter came in ninth place in the sprint and 17th place in the 5 km classic. She was also part of the Italian relay team that came in eighth place in the 4 x 3.3 km relay. She competed in cross-country skiing at the 2022 Winter EYOF, winning the 5 km classic. She came in third place in the sprint, behind Tove Ericsson and Elin Näslund, both from Sweden.

== Cross-country skiing results ==
=== Olympic Games ===
Year	Age	Individual	Skiathlon	Mass start	Sprint	Relay	Team sprint
2026	21	—	—	—	16	6	8

=== World Championships ===
Year	Age	Individual	Skiathlon	Mass start	Sprint	Relay	Team sprint
2023	18	—	—	—	22	—	—
