= Czech Republic at the Paralympics =

- IOC code: CZE
- NOC: Czech Paralympic Committee
- Website: www.paralympic.cz (in Czech and English)
- Medals Ranked 34th: Gold 49 Silver 53 Bronze 58 Total 160

Summer appearances
- 1996; 2000; 2004; 2008; 2012; 2016; 2020; 2024

Winter appearances
- 1994; 1998; 2002; 2006; 2010; 2014; 2018; 2022; 2026

Other related appearances
- Czechoslovakia (1972–1992)

The Czech Paralympic team are the athletes and their support teams, who represent or represented the Czech Republic at the Paralympic Games. It also includes a team of many people who have to coordinate security, and work on the preparation and realization of all Czech Paralympic activities.

The Czech Paralympic Committee (CPC) is the body whose main function is to develop ideas of Paralympism in the Czech Republic and is responsible for preparing and supplying stately representation for the Czech Republic at the Summer or Winter Paralympic Games.

The mascot for the Czech Paralympic team is a bird named "Emil".

== Medal tables ==
=== Summer Paralympic Games ===
| Event | Gold | Silver | Bronze | Total | Ranking |
| 1996 Summer Paralympics | 2 | 7 | 1 | 10 | 36th |
| 2000 Summer Paralympics | 15 | 15 | 13 | 43 | 11th |
| 2004 Summer Paralympics | 16 | 8 | 7 | 31 | 12th |
| 2008 Summer Paralympics | 6 | 3 | 18 | 27 | 16th |
| 2012 Summer Paralympics | 1 | 6 | 4 | 11 | 42nd |
| 2016 Summer Paralympics | 1 | 2 | 4 | 7 | 51st |
| 2020 Summer Paralympics | 2 | 3 | 3 | 8 | 44th |
| 2024 Summer Paralympics | 1 | 4 | 3 | 8 | 53rd |
| Total | 44 | 48 | 53 | 145 | |

=== Winter Paralympic Games ===
| Event | Gold | Silver | Bronze | Total | Ranking |
| 1994 Winter Paralympics | 0 | 0 | 1 | 1 | 22nd |
| 1998 Winter Paralympics | 3 | 3 | 1 | 7 | 13th |
| 2002 Winter Paralympics | 2 | 1 | 2 | 5 | 14th |
| 2006 Winter Paralympics | 0 | 1 | 0 | 1 | 17th |
| 2010 Winter Paralympics | 0 | 0 | 1 | 1 | 20th |
| 2014 Winter Paralympics | 0 | 0 | 0 | 0 | - |
| 2018 Winter Paralympics | 0 | 0 | 0 | 0 | - |
| 2022 Winter Paralympics | 0 | 0 | 0 | 0 | - |
| 2026 Winter Paralympics | 1 | 4 | 1 | 6 | 16th |
| Total | 6 | 9 | 6 | 21 | |

== Multi-medalists ==
Czech athletes who have won at least four medals of any colour, including the medals won for Czechoslovakia.

| No. | Athlete | Sport | Years | Games | Gender | Gold | Silver | Bronze | Total |
|---|---|---|---|---|---|---|---|---|---|
| 1 | Jiří Ježek | Cycling | 2000-2008 | 3 | M | 6 | 4 | 1 | 11 |
| 2 | Kateřina Teplá | Alpine skiing | 1992-2002 | 4 | F | 5 | 4 | 0 | 9 |
| 3 | Roman Musil | Athletics; Cycling | 2000-2008 | 3 | M | 4 | 1 | 2 | 7 |
| 4 | Běla Třebínová (née Hlaváčková) | Swimming | 2004-2016 | 3 | F | 3 | 2 | 2 | 7 |
| 5 | David Drahonínský | Archery | 2008-2024 | 5 | M | 2 | 4 | 1 | 7 |
| 6 | Rostislav Pohlmann | Athletics | 1996-2008 | 4 | M | 1 | 2 | 3 | 6 |
| 7 | Martin Kovář | Swimming | 1996-2004 | 3 | M | 4 | 0 | 1 | 5 |
| 8 | Michal Stefanu | Table tennis | 1996-2008 | 4 | M | 2 | 2 | 1 | 5 |
| 9 | Pavla Valníčková | Athletics; Cross-country skiing | 1992 | 2 | F | 2 | 1 | 2 | 5 |
| 10 | Jolana Matoušková (née Davídková) | Table tennis | 1996-2004 | 3 | F | 1 | 4 | 0 | 5 |
| 11 | Sabina Rogie | Alpine skiing | 1998-2002 | 2 | F | 0 | 2 | 3 | 5 |
| 12 | Šárka Pultar Musilová | Archery | 2016-2024 | 3 | F | 0 | 4 | 1 | 5 |
| 13 | Jiří Bouška | Cycling | 2004-2012 | 3 | M | 0 | 1 | 4 | 5 |
| 14 | Jan Povýšil | Swimming | 2000-2012 | 4 | M | 0 | 0 | 5 | 5 |
| 15 | Eva Lemežová | Alpine skiing | 1976 | 1 | F | 3 | 1 | 0 | 4 |
| 16 | Martin Němec | Athletics | 2000-2008 | 3 | M | 2 | 1 | 1 | 4 |
| 17 | Simona Bubeníčková | Biathlon; Cross-country skiing | 2026 | 1 | F | 0 | 3 | 1 | 4 |
| 18 | Eva Berná | Athletics | 2004-2016 | 4 | F | 0 | 0 | 4 | 4 |

== See also ==
- Czech Republic at the Olympics
- Czechoslovakia at the Paralympics
