= United States at the 1992 Winter Paralympics =

- Flag of the United States
- IPC code: USA
- NPC: United States Paralympic Committee
- Website: www.teamusa.org/US-Paralympics

in Tignes-Albertville
- Competitors: 29
- Medals Ranked 1st: Gold 20 Silver 16 Bronze 9 Total 45

Winter Paralympics appearances (overview)
- 1976; 1980; 1984; 1988; 1992; 1994; 1998; 2002; 2006; 2010; 2014; 2018; 2022; 2026

United States competed at the 1992 Winter Paralympics in Tignes/Albertville, France. 29 competitors from United States won 45 medals including 20 gold, 16 silver and 9 bronze and finished 1st in the medal table.

== See also ==
- United States at the Paralympics
- United States at the 1992 Winter Olympics
