= Austria at the 1992 Winter Paralympics =

- IPC code: AUT
- NPC: Austrian Paralympic Committee
- Website: www.oepc.at (in German)

in Tignes-Albertville
- Competitors: 31
- Medals Ranked 4th: Gold 8 Silver 3 Bronze 9 Total 20

Winter Paralympics appearances (overview)
- 1976; 1980; 1984; 1988; 1992; 1994; 1998; 2002; 2006; 2010; 2014; 2018; 2022; 2026

Austria competed at the 1992 Winter Paralympics in Tignes/Albertville, France. 31 competitors from Austria won 20 medals including 8 gold, 3 silver and 9 bronze and finished 4th in the medal table.

== See also ==
- Austria at the Paralympics
- Austria at the 1992 Winter Olympics
