= 1992 Winter Paralympics =

Multi-parasport event in Tignes and Albertville, France

V Paralympic Winter Games
- Location: Tignes and Albertville, France
- Nations: 24
- Athletes: 365 (288 men and 77 women)
- Events: 78 in 2 sports
- Opening: 25 March 1992
- Closing: 1 April 1992
- Opened by: President François Mitterrand
- Closed by: IPC President Robert Steadward
- Cauldron: Luc Sabatier
- Stadium: Stade Lognan

The 1992 Paralympic Winter Games (French: Jeux paralympiques d'hiver de 1992) were the fifth Winter Paralympics. They were the first Winter Paralympics to be celebrated with the International Olympic Committee cooperation. They were also the first ever Paralympics or a Winter Parasports event held in France. They were held at the resort of Tignes as a support venue of the main host city Albertville, France, from 25 March to 1 April 1992. For the first time, demonstration events in Alpine and Nordic Skiing for athletes with an intellectual disability and Biathlon for athletes with a visual impairment were held.

== Sports ==
The games consisted of 79 events in three disciplines of two sports.

- Alpine skiing
- Nordic skiing
  - Biathlon
  - Cross-country skiing

== Medal table ==
The top 10 NPCs by number of gold medals are listed below. The host nation (France) is highlighted.

Rank	Nation	Gold	Silver	Bronze	Total
1	United States	20	16	9	45
2	Germany	12	17	9	38
3	Unified Team	10	8	3	21
4	Austria	8	3	9	20
5	Finland	7	3	4	14
6	France*	6	4	9	19
7	Norway	5	5	4	14
8	Switzerland	3	8	4	15
9	Canada	2	4	6	12
10	Poland	2	0	3	5
Totals (10 entries)		75	68	60	203

== Participating nations ==
Twenty four nations participated in the 1992 Winter Paralympics. Germany became an independent country after their reunification while Soviet Union was in the process of their country's dissolution. Estonia, Liechtenstein and South Korea made their debut appearances at the Winter Games.

- Australia (5)
- Austria (31)
- Belgium (3)
- Canada (19)
- Czechoslovakia (16)
- Denmark (5)
- Estonia (1)
- Finland (17)
- France (31) (Host nation)
- Germany (36)
- Great Britain (15)
- Italy (27)
- Japan (15)
- Liechtenstein (1)
- Netherlands (7)
- New Zealand (7)
- Norway (23)
- Poland (13)
- South Korea (2)
- Spain (13)
- Sweden (9)
- Switzerland (19)
- Unified Team (21)
- United States (29)

== Visual identity ==
The logo was designed by Jean-Michel Folon. It featured a bird with broken wings flying high over a mountain peak, symbolizing the abilities of the participating athletes.

== See also ==
- 1992 Winter Olympics
- 1992 Summer Paralympics
- 2024 Summer Paralympics
- 2030 Winter Olympics
- 2030 Winter Paralympics

Preceded by Innsbruck	Winter Paralympics; Tignes–Albertville; V Paralympic Winter Games (1992)	Succeeded by Lillehammer
