= Australia at the 1994 Winter Paralympics =

- IPC code: AUS
- NPC: Australian Paralympic Committee
- Website: www.paralympic.org.au

in Lillehammer
- Competitors: 6 in 1 sport
- Medals Ranked 11th: Gold 3 Silver 2 Bronze 4 Total 9

Winter Paralympics appearances (overview)
- 1976; 1980; 1984; 1988; 1992; 1994; 1998; 2002; 2006; 2010; 2014; 2018; 2022; 2026

The 1994 Winter Paralympics were held in Lillehammer, Norway. Australia sent six male skiers, who won three gold, two silver and four bronze medals. Australia, at the time, achieved their best ever performance at a Winter Paralympics, finishing 5th overall in the alpine skiing competition, 9th in the medal standings, and 11th in the total medal count out of 31 nations.

== Background ==
Despite the previous Winter Olympics being held in 1992, a 1986 decision made by the International Organising Committee (IOC) was implemented, denoting that the Summer and Winter Olympic Games be held on alternating 4 year cycles, occurring on even years. Thus, the 1994 games were held a mere 2 years after the previous Winter Olympics of Albertville (France) in 1992. The Games were held from Thursday March 10, to Saturday March 19, and consisted of 133 events across 5 sports. 31 Nations participated, with a total of 471 participating athletes. The 1994 Winter Paralympics were also the first Games organized by the International Paralympic Committee (IPC).

=== Logo ===
The logo for the 1994 Winter Paralympics featured a white sun figure on a blue background, depicting the sun people. It aimed to evoke feelings of power, vitality, strength, and energy, seen as characteristics of disabled athletes. This was the final time the five multicolored 'tae-guks', located at the base of the illustration, were used in connection with the Paralympic Games.

=== Mascot ===
A competition was conducted for the creation of the mascot for the 1994 Winter Paralympics, with Tor Lindrupsen winning with his drawing of 'Sondre'. The mascot for the Games, 'Sondre', is a friendly teenage troll boy who is 'charming, good-natured, elegant, and poised', and has his left leg amputated above the knee. The name of the mascot was decided via a competition, and is named after the great skiing pioneer, Sondre Nordheim.

=== Australia's preparation ===
Given the shorter than usual hiatus of two years between Paralympic Games, the Australian Winter Paralympic team began a two-year intensive squad development and training program. To accompany this program, high-profile coach Steve Graham was appointed as coach of the winter Paralympic team. Six separate camps were conducted in Australia between October 1992 and October 1993, followed by the selection of the Winter Paralympic team in November 1993. The team's training concluded with 4 weeks training and racing in Tamsweg, Austria, followed by one week of training at Hafjell, Norway - the location of the Alpine skiing events during the Games. Tamsweg was chosen as a training site due to its similarity in conditions to Hafjell, Norway.

== Medalists ==
Medal	Name	Sport	Event
Gold	Michael Norton	Alpine skiing	Men's slalom LWXI
Gold	Michael Norton	Alpine skiing	Men's Super-G LWXI
Gold	Michael Milton	Alpine skiing	Men's giant slalom LW2
Silver	Michael Milton	Alpine skiing	Men's slalom LW2
Silver	James Paterson	Alpine skiing	Men's Downhill LW9
Bronze	James Paterson	Alpine skiing	Men's giant slalom LW9
Bronze	Michael Milton	Alpine skiing	Men's Super-G LW2
Bronze	Michael Milton	Alpine skiing	Men's Downhill LW2
Bronze	David Munk	Alpine skiing	Men's giant slalom LWXI

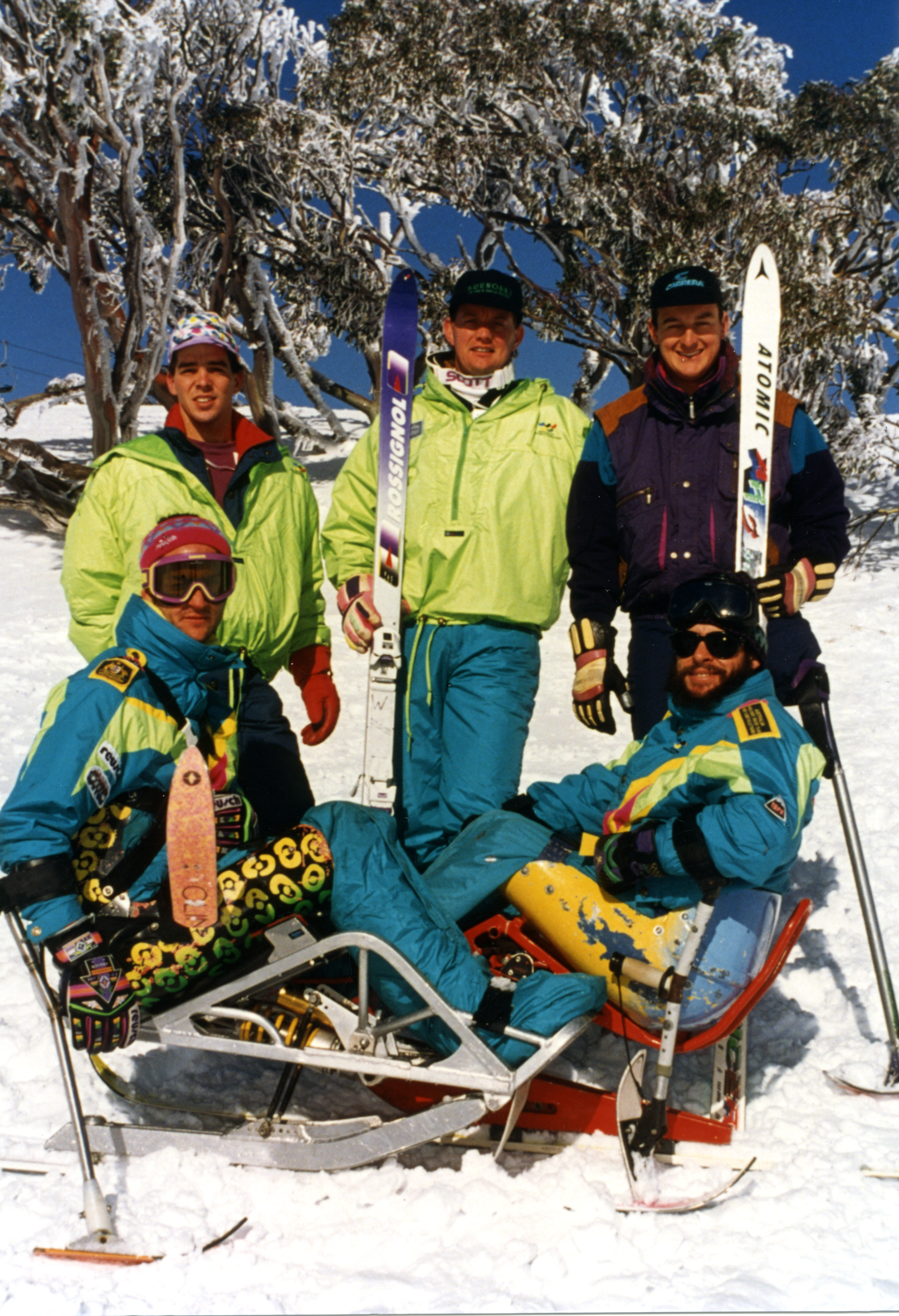
Australian athletes Windham, Patterson, Munk, Milton and Hacon at the 1994 Lillehammer Winter Games

== Event results with Australian podium finishes ==
=== Men's slalom LWXI ===
Medal	Name	Country	Time
Gold	NORTON Michael	Australia	1:54.32
Silver	SHINOHE Ryuei	Japan	2:12.69
Bronze	BOWNESS William	United States of America	2:13.02

=== Men's Super-G LWXI ===
Medal	Name	Country	Time
Gold	NORTON Michael	Australia	1:32.70
Silver	MCDOUGAL Michael	United States of America	1:34.06
Bronze	BOWNESS William	United States of America	1:36.47

=== Men's giant slalom LW2 ===
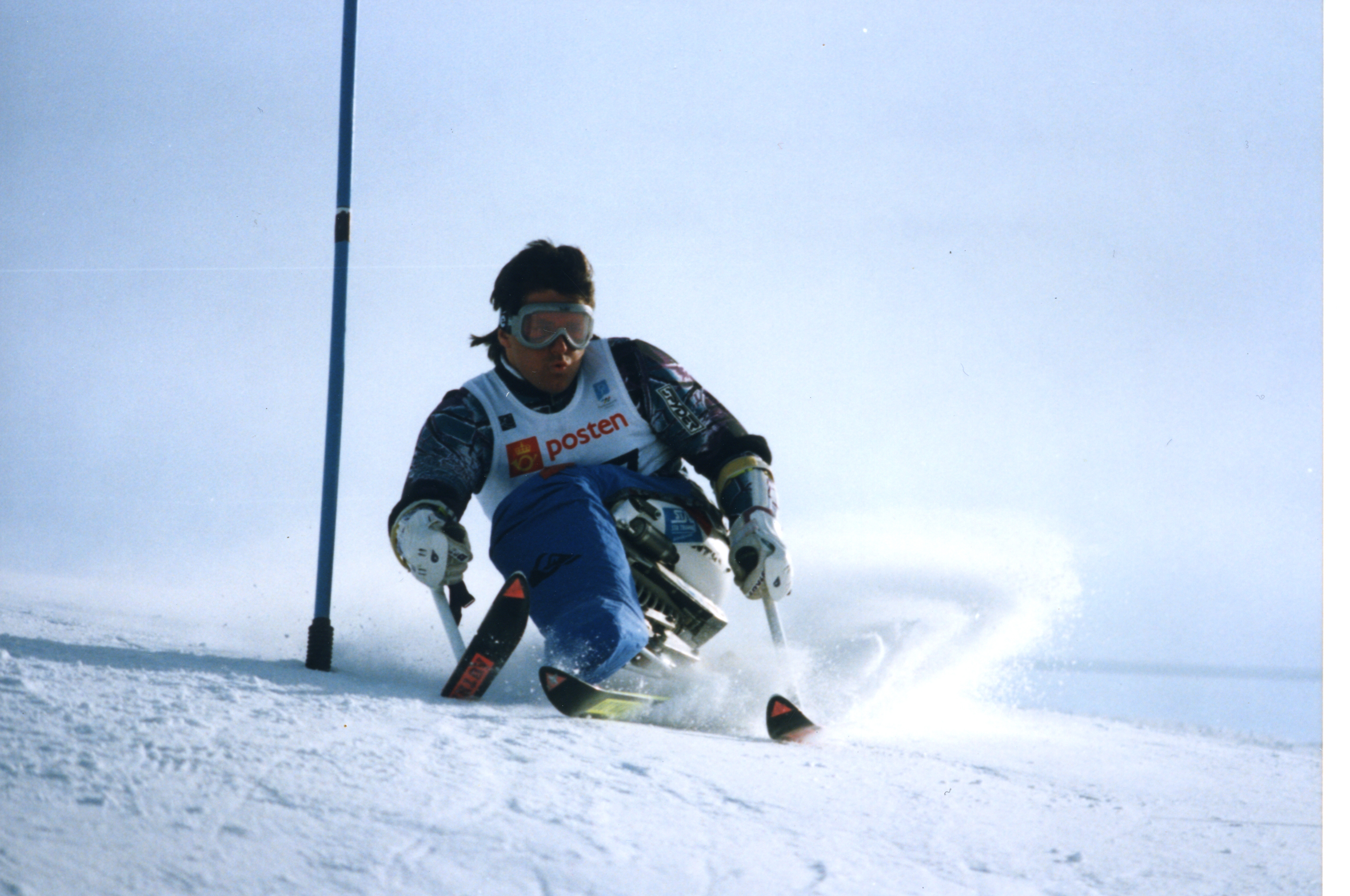
Michael Norton Competing in the men's slalom LW2 at the 1994 Winter Paralympics.

Medal	Name	Country	Time
Gold	MILTON Michael	Australia	2:25.88
Silver	SPITZ Alexander	Germany	2:26.70
Bronze	MANNINO Greg	United States of America	2:26.79

=== Men's slalom LW2 ===
Medal	Name	Country	Time
Gold	SPITZ Alexander	Germany	1:15.78
Silver	MILTON Michael	Australia	1:18.05
Bronze	MEIER Monte	United States of America	1:20.29

=== Men's Downhill LW9 ===
Medal	Name	Country	Time
Gold	MOURIC Tristan	France	1:19.87
Silver	PATERSON James Lawrence	Australia	1:21.40
Bronze	HIRSCHBUEHL Arno	Austria	1:22.15

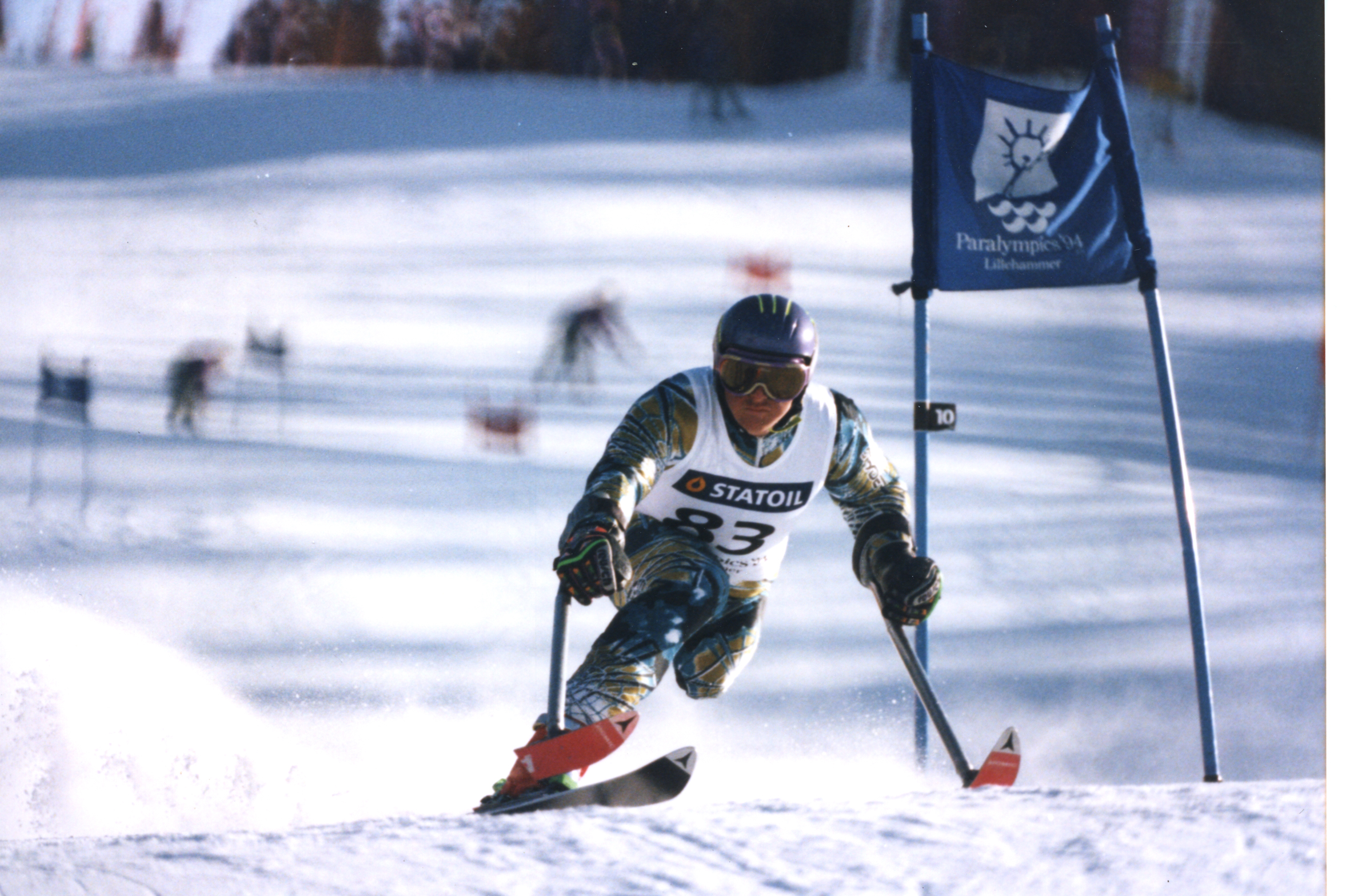
Michael Milton competing at the 1994 Winter Paralympics.

=== Men's giant slalom LW9 ===
Medal	Name	Country	Time
Gold	SEISCHAB Eberhard	Germany	2:33.41
Silver	MOURIC Tristan	France	2:35.60
Bronze	PATERSON James Lawrence	Australia	2:36.46

=== Men's Super-G LW2 ===
Medal	Name	Country	Time
Gold	MANNINO Greg	United States of America	1:17.76
Silver	SPITZ Alexander	Germany	1:18.97
Bronze	MILTON Michael	Australia	1:19.05

=== Men's Downhill LW2 ===
Medal	Name	Country	Time
Gold	MANNINO Greg	United States of America	1:16.81
Silver	SPITZ Alexander	Germany	1:17.98
Bronze	MILTON Michael	Australia	1:18.34

=== Men's giant slalom LWXI ===
Medal	Name	Country	Time
Gold	DAVIS John	United States of America	2:59.86
Silver	SHINOHE Ryuei	Japan	3:03.21
Bronze	MUNK David	Australia	3:03.24

== Notable team members ==
=== Michael Norton ===
==== Background ====
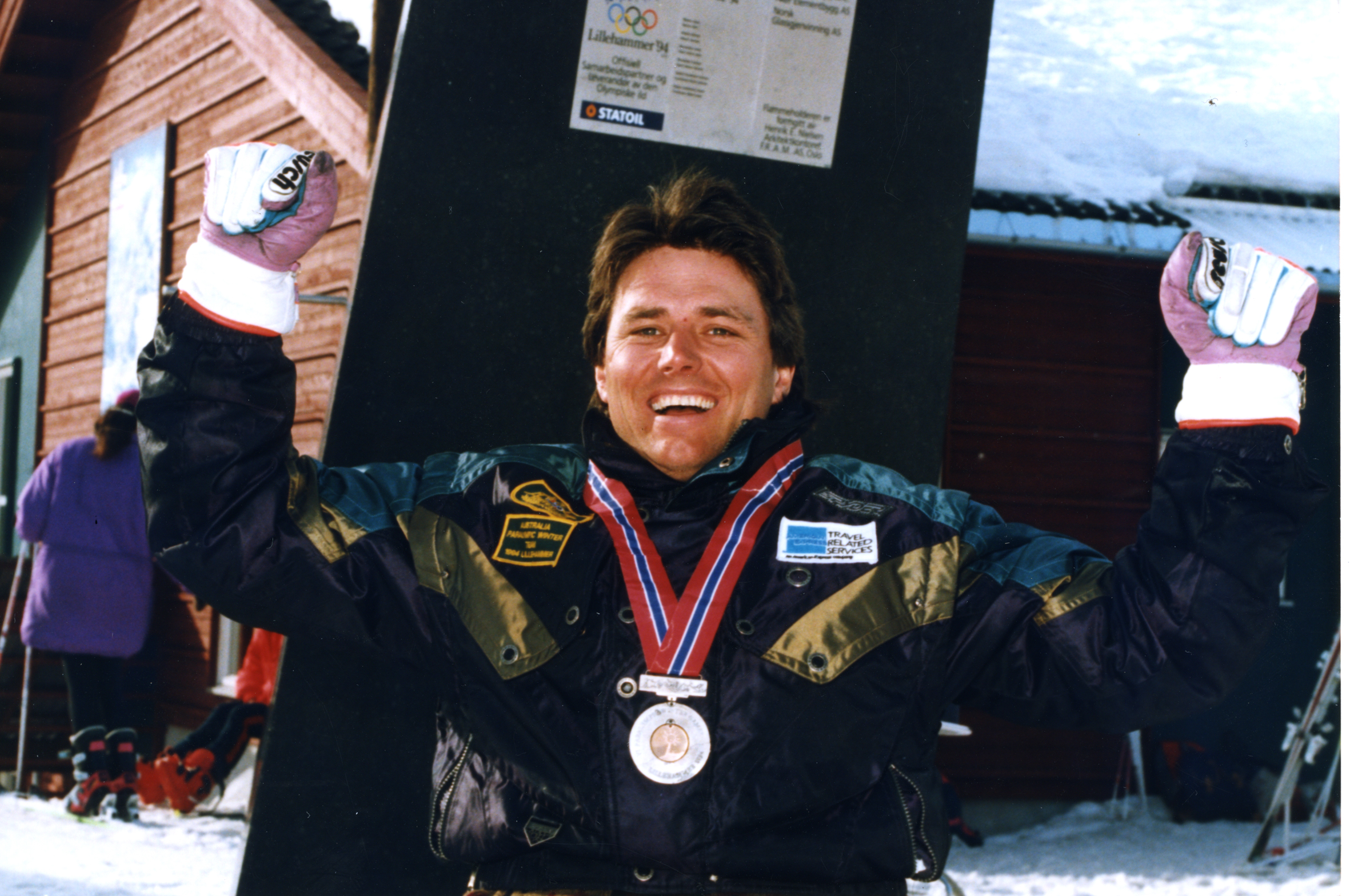
Australian medalist Michael Norton at the 1994 Lillehammer Winter Games

Michael Norton was born in 1964, and grew up on a dairy farm in Leongatha. In February 1984, whilst riding his motorbike home from work, Michael hit a rock and came off his bike, leaving him paralysed. He established and coached at a ski school in Mount Buller for disabled people, and frequently made television appearances in a bid to raise the profile of disability sport in Australia.

==== Previous sporting success ====
After his paralysis, Michael began wheelchair racing, and won the Australian wheelchair racing championship in Adelaide during February 1986. He learnt to ski in 1987, after being taught by George Macpherson, a founder of sit skiing Australia. In 1988 he was invited to Canada by ski coach Dean Sheppard, in a bid to develop a career in ski racing. Michael competed at the 1990 IPC Alpine Skiing World Championships in Colorado, as well as competing in the 1992 Tignes-Albertville Winter Paralympics. He won a bronze medal in the men's slalom LW11 event at the 1992 Winter Paralympics.

==== Lillehammer Paralympic results ====
Leading up to the 1994 Lillehammer Winter Paralympics, Michael had a crash during training that left him unconscious. Despite this, he would go on to win a gold in the men's slalom LWXI and the men's Super-G LWXI. Michael's LWXI disability classification was seen as - sitting: paraplegia with fair functional sitting balance.

=== Michael Milton ===
==== Background ====
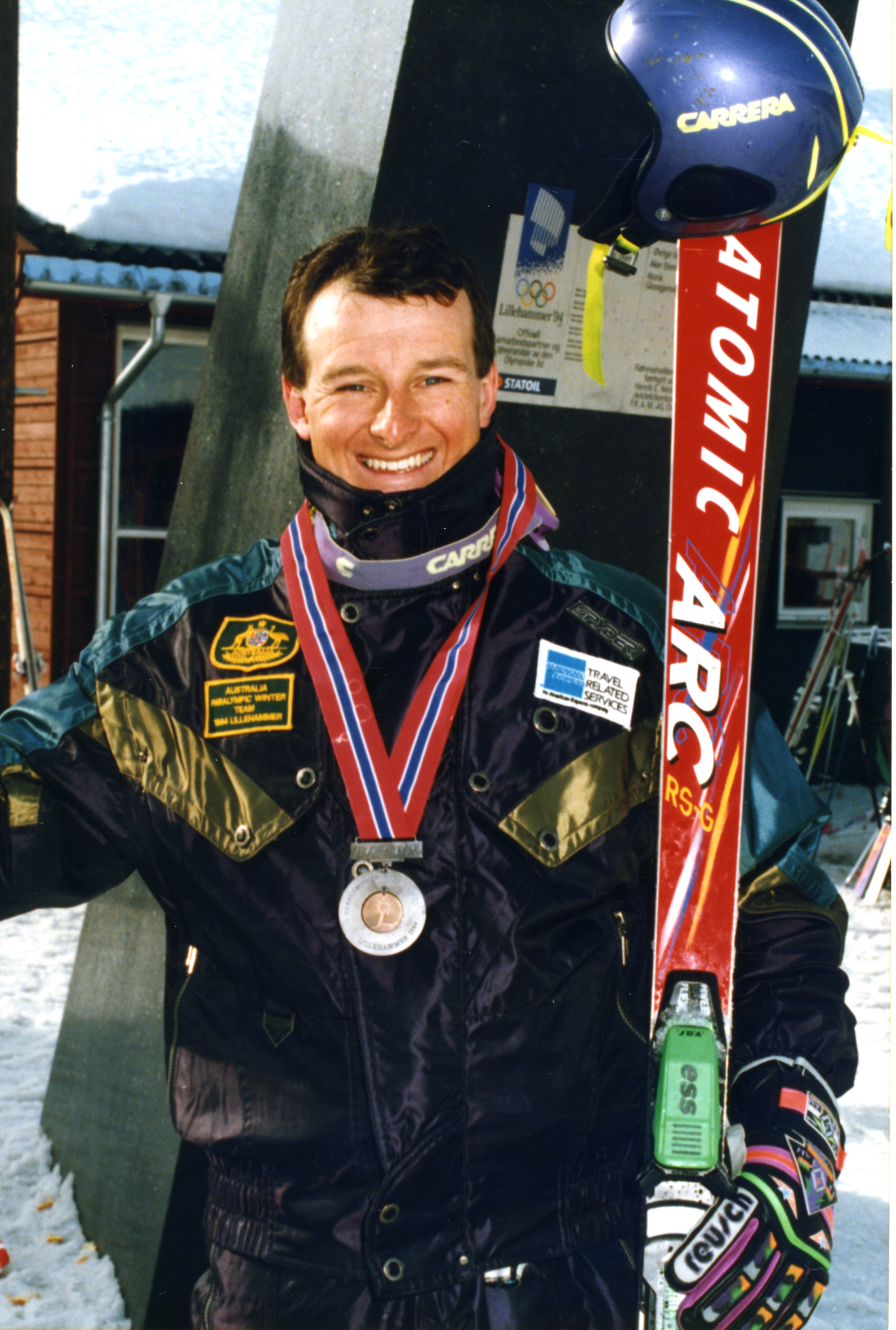
Michael Milton at the 1994 Lillehammer Winter Paralympics.

Michael Milton was born in Canberra, in 1973. He started skiing at the age of 3, only to have his left leg amputated above the knee when he was 9 years old, due to cancer. His home ski resort is located at Thredbo, New South Wales. Michael also competed in the 2002 Salt Lake City Winter Paralympics, where he won four gold medals. He is the current Australian record holder for the fastest downhill skier (open record), posting a speed of 213.65 km/h. He also went on to compete at the 2006 Winter Paralympics. Deciding to change career paths, Michael took up cycling, and went on to win a gold medal in the 3000m Individual Pursuit at the Australian Track Cycling championship, breaking the Australian record. He was inducted into the Australian Institute of Sport 'Best of the Best' in 2001, and in 2014 was the assistant alpine skiing coach of the Australian Winter Paralympic team at the Sochi Games.

==== Previous sporting success ====
Michael made his first Paralympic debut at the 1988 Innsbruck Winter Paralympics, but took home no medals. He proceeded to compete at the 1992 Tignes-Albertville Winter Paralympics, where he won a gold medal in the men's slalom LW2 event, and a silver medal in the men's Super-G LW2 event, for which he was awarded a medal of the Order of Australia. In 1992, he also won the slalom in the Australian Championships, and won the slalom and super giant slalom at the Columbia Crest Cup in 1993.

==== Lillehammer Paralympic results ====
At the 1994 Winter Paralympics, Michael made his best performance to date when he won a gold medal in the men's giant slalom LW2 event, a silver medal in the men's slalom LW2 event, and bronze medals in the men's Super-G LW2 and Downhill LW2 events. Michael's LW2 disability classification is seen as 'standing: single leg amputation above the knee'. He won a total of 4 medals at the Games, giving him a total of 6 Winter Paralympic medals at the time.

=== James Paterson ===
==== Background ====
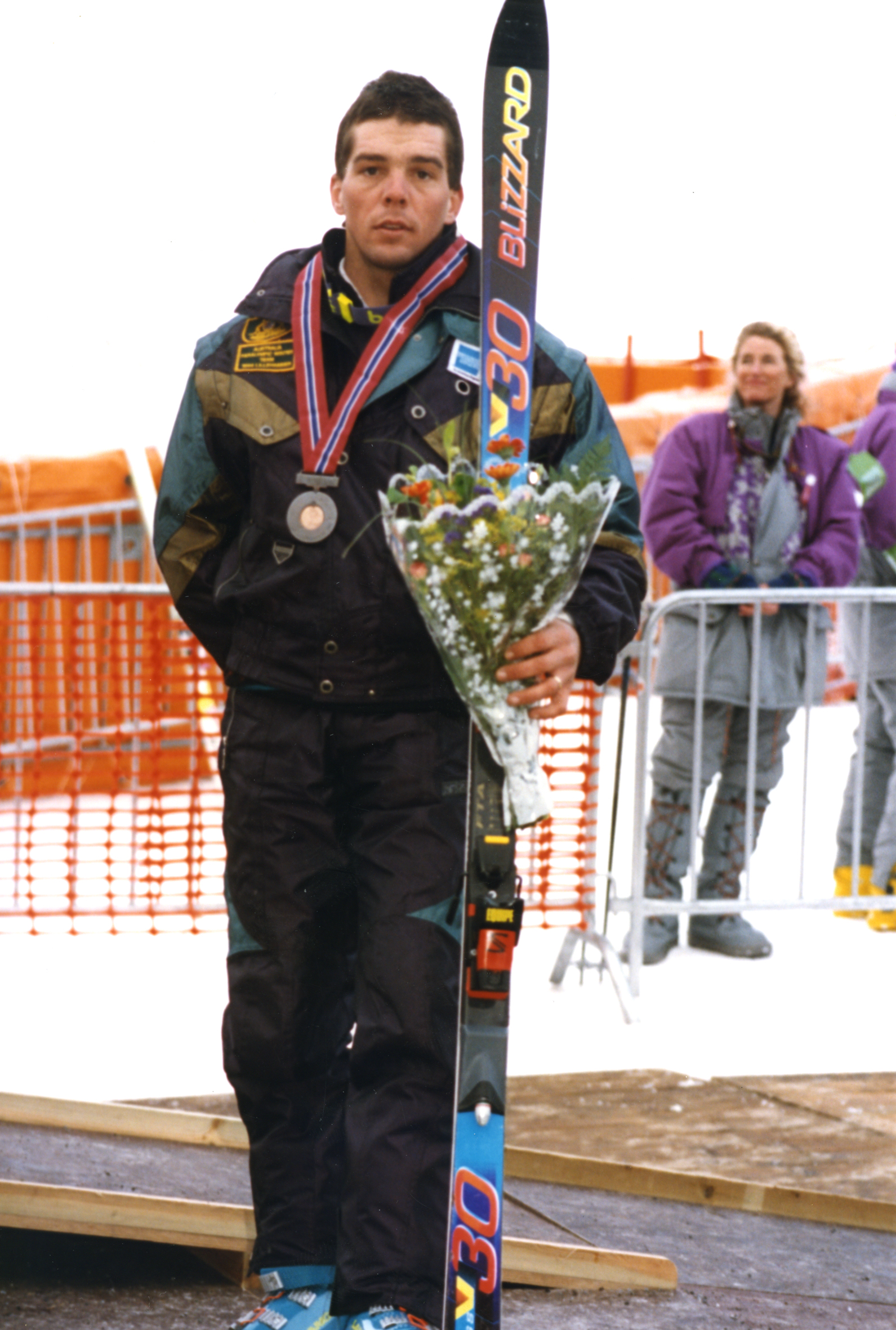
James Patterson at the 1994 Lillehammer Winter Paralympics

James Paterson was born in Terrigal, New South Wales, and was diagnosed with cerebral palsy. He worked as a marine mechanic for Halvorsen Boats, who supported his overseas preparation in the lead-up to the 1994 Games. Along with competing at the 1994 Winter Paralympics, he also competed at the 1996 IPC Alpine Skiing World Championships, where he won a silver medal and two bronze medals. Two years later, he represented Australia again at the 1998 Winter Paralympics where he was team captain and competed in four events, winning a gold medal in the men's Downhill LW9, and a bronze medal in the men's slalom LW9. He also went on to win a silver medal at the 2000 IPC Alpine Skiing World Championships in the men's giant slalom LW9.

==== Lillehammer Paralympic results ====
James made his Winter Paralympic debut at the 1994 Winter Paralympic Games, where he competed in all alpine skiing events, in the LW9 disability classification. He walked away with a silver medal in the men's Downhill LW9, and a bronze medal in the men's giant slalom LW9. James' disability classification of LW9, is seen as 'standing: amputation or equivalent impairment of one arm and one leg'.

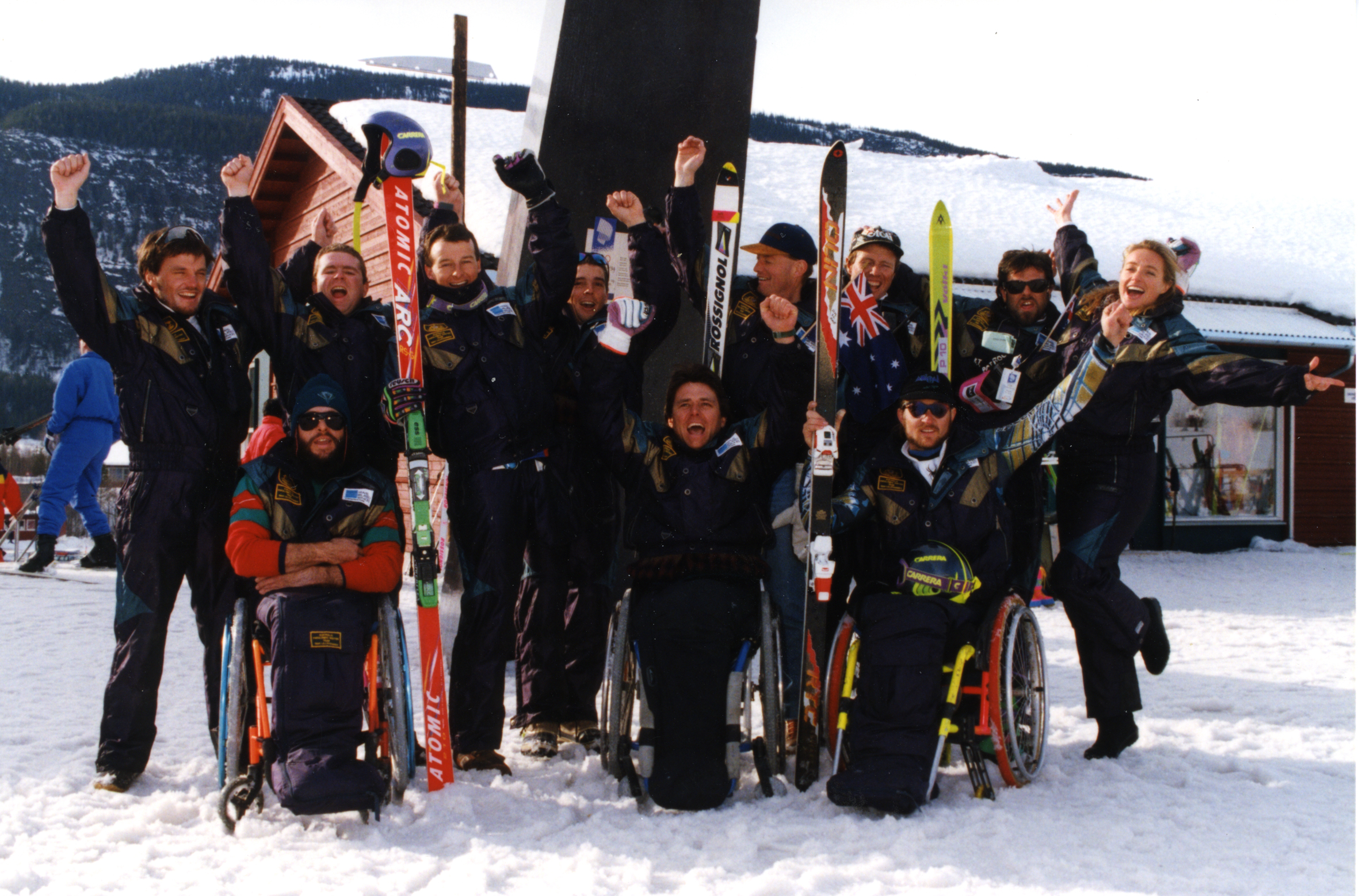
The Australian Team at the 1994 Lillehammer Winter Games

== Administration ==
Team officials were:

Chef de Mission - Nick Dean
Manager - Ron Finneran
Coaches - Steve Graham, Dean Sheppard
Media - Paul Griffiths
Support staff - Alan Dean, Eddie Jesiolowski, David Howells, Fiona Barnsdall

== Alpine skiing results ==
Men

Athlete	Event	Time	Rank
Rod Hacon	Men's Downhill LWXII	1:33.81	5
Rod Hacon	Men's giant slalom LWXII	DNF	
Rod Hacon	Men's slalom LWXII	DNF	
Rod Hacon	Men's Super-G LWXII	1:35.15	4
Michael Milton	Men's Downhill LW2	1:18.34	3rd place, bronze medalist(s)
Michael Milton	Men's Super-G LW2	1:19.05	3rd place, bronze medalist(s)
Michael Milton	Men's giant slalom LW2	2:25.88	1st place, gold medalist(s)
Michael Milton	Men's slalom LW2	1:18.05	2nd place, silver medalist(s)
David Munk	Men's Downhill LWXI	1:58.59	5
David Munk	Men's slalom LWXI	2:15.14	4
David Munk	Men's Super-G LWXI	1:38.67	5
David Munk	Men's giant slalom LWXI	3:03.24	3rd place, bronze medalist(s)
Michael Norton	Men's Downhill LWXI	DNF	
Michael Norton	Men's giant slalom LWXI	DNF	
Michael Norton	Men's slalom LWXI	1:54.32	1st place, gold medalist(s)
Michael Norton	Men's Super-G LWXI	1:32.70	1st place, gold medalist(s)
James Paterson	Men's slalom LW9	DSQ	
James Paterson	Men's Super-G LW9	DNF	
James Paterson	Men's giant slalom LW9	2:36.46	3rd place, bronze medalist(s)
James Paterson	Men's Downhill LW9	1:21.40	2nd place, silver medalist(s)
Craig Windham	Men's giant slalom LW6/8	DSQ	
Craig Windham	Men's slalom LW6/8	DNF	

=== Alpine skiing medal tally ===
Rank	Nation	Gold medal	Silver medal	Bronze medal	Total
1	United States (USA)	24	9	6	39
2	Germany (GER)	11	11	10	32
3	France (FRA)	9	4	8	21
4	Austria (AUT)	7	13	8	28
5	Australia (AUS)	3	2	4	9
6	New Zealand (NZL)	3	0	3	6
7	Norway (NOR)	2	4	0	6
8	Switzerland (SUI)	2	3	2	7
9	Sweden (SWE)	2	1	1	4
10	Spain (ESP)	1	6	3	10
11	Canada (CAN)	1	2	4	7
12	Russia (RUS)	1	0	1	2
13	Italy (ITA)	0	6	3	9
14	Japan (JPN)	0	3	3	6
15	Slovakia (SVK)	0	3	2	5
16	Great Britain (GBR)	0	0	4	4
17	Belgium (BEL)	0	0	1	1
17	Czech Republic (CZE)	0	0	1	1
17	Liechtenstein (LIE)	0	0	1	1
Total		66	67	65	198

== Events ==
=== Men's Downhill ===
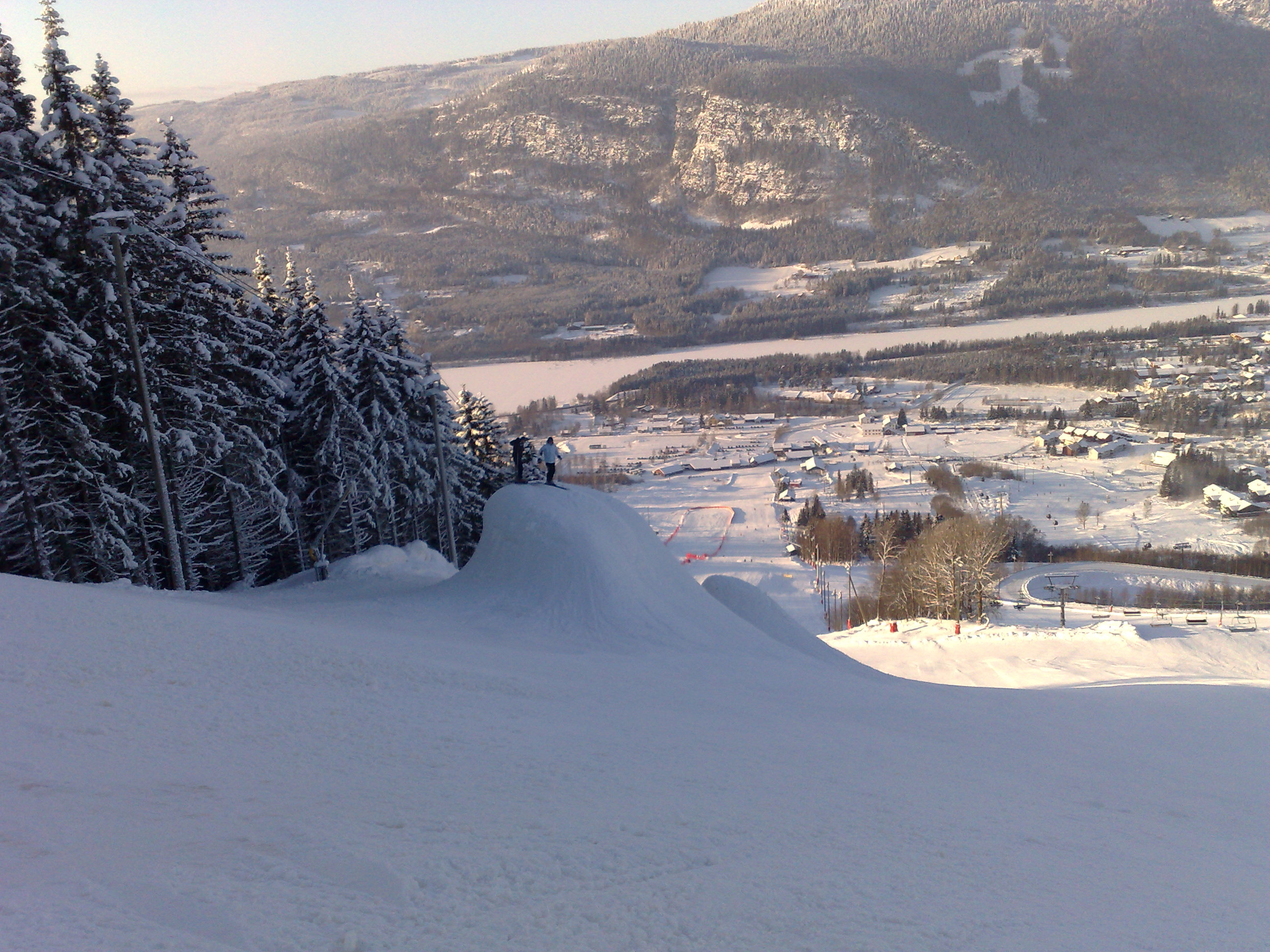
Hafjell, Norway. Location of the technical skiing events during the 1994 Winter Olympics and Paralympics.

Downhill skiing is a discipline of alpine skiing that prioritizes speed over turning or technique. A typical Downhill course starts near the top of a mountain, and has gates that are farther apart than other alpine skiing disciplines, and includes challenging turns, shallow dips, flats, and small airs. Speeds of up to 130 km/h are common in international competition.

=== Men's slalom ===
Slalom is an alpine skiing discipline that involves skiing between poles or gates, that are typically spaced closer together than Giant slalom or Downhill disciplines. Higher speeds are sacrificed for the need for tighter and sharper turns.

=== Men's giant slalom ===
The Giant slalom involves skiing between sets of poles or gates, spaced farther apart than the slalom, but less than that those in the Super-G. A typical course must have a total vertical drop of 250m to 450m, and speeds of up to 40 km/h are common in international competition.

=== Men's Super-G ===
Super-G (or Super-Giant slalom) is a downhill skiing discipline that also involves skiing between gates or poles. Gates are further apart in the Super-G than in the giant slalom or slalom, and speeds are therefore typically faster. In a typical Super-G course, gates are set so the skiers must turn more than in downhill (the other speed discipline).

== Classifications ==
Alpine skiing at the games consisted of four events for both men and women, with each event containing 12 different disability classifications.

=== Standing skiers ===
- LW2 - standing: single leg amputation above the knee
- LW 3 - standing: double leg amputation below the knee, mild cerebral palsy, or equivalent impairment
- LW4 - standing: single leg amputation below the knee
- LW5/7 - standing: double arm amputation
- LW6/8 - standing: single arm amputation
- LW9 - standing: amputation or equivalent impairment of one arm and one leg

=== Sitting skiers ===
- LWX - sitting: paraplegia with no or some upper abdominal function and no functional sitting balance
- LWXI - sitting: paraplegia with fair functional sitting balance
- LWXII - sitting: double leg amputation above the knees, or paraplegia with some leg function and good sitting balance

=== Visual impairments ===
- B1 - visually impaired: no functional vision
- B2 - visually impaired: up to ca 3-5% functional vision
- B3 - visually impaired: under 10% functional vision

== Medal table ==
Australia finished in 9th (out of 31 nations) with 3 gold medals, 2 silver medals, and 4 bronze medals, for a total of 9 medals. This was a stark improvement from 2 years prior at the Albertville Paralympics, where they won 1 gold medal, 1 silver medal, and 2 bronze medals. This is Australia's second best medal position to date, surpassed only by the 2002 Salt Lake City Team who placed 8th with 6 gold medals. The 1994 Winter Paralympics was also the most medals amassed by an Australian Winter Paralympic team, contributing to almost a third of Australia's total Winter Paralympic medals (30).

=== Medal table of the top ten finishing nations ===
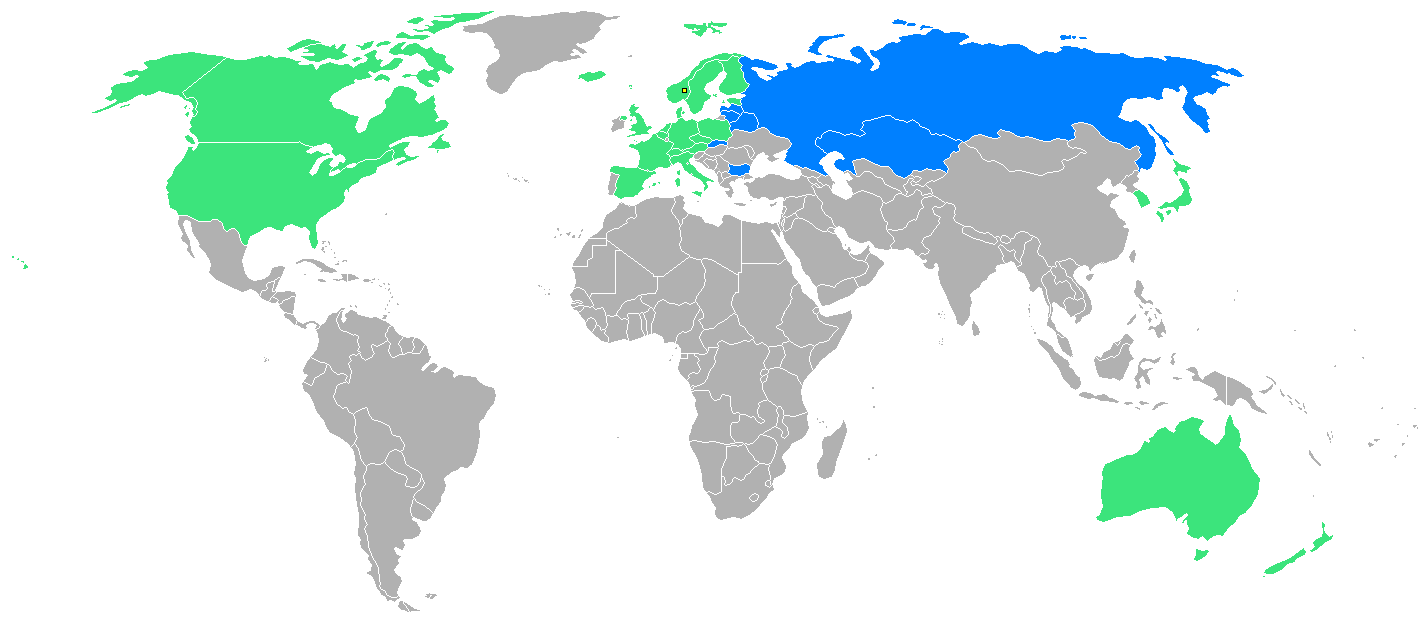
Map of participating countries of the 1994 Winter Paralympics. Blue countries are those participating for the first time.

To sort this table by nation, total medal count, or any other column, click on the icon next to the column title.

* Host nation (Norway)

Rank	Nation	Gold	Silver	Bronze	Total
1	Norway*	29	22	13	64
2	Germany	25	21	18	64
3	United States	24	12	7	43
4	France	14	6	11	31
5	Russia	10	12	8	30
6	Austria	7	16	12	35
7	Finland	7	6	11	24
8	Sweden	3	3	2	8
9	Australia	3	2	4	9
10	New Zealand	3	0	3	6
Totals (10 entries)		125	100	89	314

== See also ==
- Australia at the Winter Paralympics
- 1994 Winter Paralympics
