= Alpine skiing at the 1994 Winter Paralympics =

Alpine skiing at the VI Paralympic Winter Games

Former Paralympic symbol (1994-2004)

Alpine skiing at the 1994 Winter Paralympics, in Lillehammer (Norway), consisted of 66 events, 46 for men and 20 for women.

== Medal table ==
Rank	Nation	Gold medal	Silver medal	Bronze medal	Total
1	United States (USA)	24	9	6	39
2	Germany (GER)	11	11	10	32
3	France (FRA)	9	4	8	21
4	Austria (AUT)	7	13	8	28
5	Australia (AUS)	3	2	4	9
6	New Zealand (NZL)	3	0	3	6
7	Norway (NOR)	2	4	0	6
8	Switzerland (SUI)	2	3	2	7
9	Sweden (SWE)	2	1	1	4
10	Spain (ESP)	1	6	3	10
11	Canada (CAN)	1	2	4	7
12	Russia (RUS)	1	0	1	2
13	Italy (ITA)	0	6	3	9
14	Japan (JPN)	0	3	3	6
15	Slovakia (SVK)	0	3	2	5
16	Great Britain (GBR)	0	0	4	4
17	Belgium (BEL)	0	0	1	1
17	Czech Republic (CZE)	0	0	1	1
17	Liechtenstein (LIE)	0	0	1	1
Total		66	67	65	198

== Medal summary ==
The competition events were:

- Downhill: men – women
- Super-G: men – women
- Giant slalom: men – women
- Slalom: men – women

Each event had separate standing, sitting, or visually impaired classifications:

- LW2 - standing: single leg amputation above the knee
- LW 3 - standing: double leg amputation below the knee, mild cerebral palsy, or equivalent impairment
- LW4 - standing: single leg amputation below the knee
- LW5/7 - standing: double arm amputation
- LW6/8 - standing: single arm amputation
- LW9 - standing: amputation or equivalent impairment of one arm and one leg
- LWX - sitting: paraplegia with no or some upper abdominal function and no functional sitting balance
- LWXI - sitting: paraplegia with fair functional sitting balance
- LWXII - sitting: double leg amputation above the knees, or paraplegia with some leg function and good sitting balance
- B1 - visually impaired: no functional vision
- B2 - visually impaired: up to ca 3-5% functional vision
- B3 - visually impaired: under 10% functional vision

=== Men's events ===
Event	Class	Gold	Silver	Bronze
Downhill	B1-2	Juan Carlos Molina; Spain	Stephane Saas; France	Manuel Buendía; Spain
Downhill	B3	Brian Santos; United States	Bruno Oberhammer; Italy	Josef Erlacher; Italy
Downhill	LW1/3	Bernard Baudean; France	Jozef Mistina; Slovakia	Peter Poetscher; Austria
Downhill	LW2	Greg Mannino; United States	Alexander Spitz; Germany	Michael Milton; Australia
Downhill	LW4	Rik Heid; United States	Hans Burn; Switzerland	James Lagerstrom; United States
Downhill	LW5/7	Gerd Schoenfelder; Germany	Cato Zahl Pedersen; Norway	Jean-Luc Jiguet; France
Downhill	LW6/8	Hannes Huettenbrenner; Austria	Meinhard Tatschl; Austria	Lionel Brun; France
Downhill	LW9	Tristan Mouric; France	James Patterson; Australia	Arno Hirschbuehl; Austria
Downhill	LWX	Chris Waddell; United States	Helmut Wolf; Italy	Takashi Kurosu; Japan
Downhill	LWXI	Wendl Eberle; Switzerland	William Bowness; United States	James Barker; Great Britain
Downhill	LWXII	Ludovic Rey-Robert; France	Daniel Cederstam; Sweden	Karl Lotz; Germany
Super-G	B1	David Sundstroem; Sweden	Vicente Garcia Salmeron; Spain	Willy Mercier; Belgium
Super-G	B2	Stephane Saas; France	Manuel Buendia; Spain	Juan Carlos Molina; Spain
Super-G	B3	Brian Santos; United States	Bruno Oberhammer; Italy	Richard Burt; Great Britain
Super-G	LW1/3	Alexei Moshkine; Russia	Bernard Baudean; France	Jozef Mistina; Slovakia
Super-G	LW2	Greg Mannino; United States	Alexander Spitz; Germany	Michael Milton; Australia
Super-G	LW4	Patrick Cooper; New Zealand	Rik Heid; United States	Hans Burn; Switzerland
Super-G	LW5/7	Cato Zahl Pedersen; Norway	Gerd Schoenfelder; Germany	Jean-Luc Jiguet; France
Super-G	LW6/8	Frank Pfortmueller; Germany	Rolf Heinzmann; Switzerland	Lionel Brun; France
Super-G	LW9	Tristan Mouric; France	Arno Hirschbuehl; Austria	Eberhard Seischab; Germany
Super-G	LWX	Chris Waddell; United States	Helmut Wolf; Italy	Matthew Stockford; Great Britain
Super-G	LWXI	Michael Norton; Australia	Michael McDougal; United States	William Bowness; United States
Super-G	LWXII	Stacy William Kohut; Canada	Paul Bluschke; Austria	Karl Lotz; Germany
Giant slalom	B1	Roy Boesiger; Switzerland	Franz Czuk; Austria	Leopold Ertl; Austria
Giant slalom	B2	Stephane Saas; France	Manuel Buendia; Spain	Gerhard Pscheider; Austria
Giant slalom	B3	Brian Santos; United States	Bruno Oberhammer; Italy	Richard Burt; Great Britain
Giant slalom	LW1/3	Bernard Baudean; France	Jozef Mistina; Slovakia	Alexei Moshkine; Russia
Giant slalom	LW2	Michael Milton; Australia	Alexander Spitz; Germany	Greg Mannino; United States
Giant slalom	LW4	Rik Heid; United States	James Lagerstrom; United States	Patrick Cooper; New Zealand
Giant slalom	LW5/7	Cato Zahl Pedersen; Norway	Gerd Schoenfelder; Germany	Jean-Luc Jiguet; France
Giant slalom	LW6/8	Frank Pfortmueller; Germany	Meinhard Tatschl; Austria	Hannes Huettenbrenner; Austria
Giant slalom	LW9	Eberhard Seischab; Germany	Tristan Mouric; France	James Patterson; Australia
Giant slalom	LWX	Chris Waddell; United States	Takashi Kurosu; Japan	Reinhold Sager; Austria
Giant slalom	LWXI	John Davis; United States	Ryuei Shinohe; Japan	David Munk; Australia
Giant slalom	LWXII	Paul Bluschke; Austria	Karl Lotz; Germany	Alain Marguerettaz; France
Slalom	B1-2	Stephane Saas; France	Manuel Buendia; Spain	Josef Gmeiner; Liechtenstein
Slalom	B3	Brian Santos; United States	Bruno Oberhammer; Italy	Manfred Perfler; Italy
Slalom	LW1/3	Chris Young; United States	Jozef Mistina; Slovakia	Kevin O'Sullivan; New Zealand
Slalom	LW2	Alexander Spitz; Germany	Michael Milton; Australia	Monte Meier; United States
Slalom	LW4	Patrick Cooper; New Zealand	Ewald Vogl; Germany	
Slalom	LW4	Patrick Cooper; New Zealand	Rik Heid; United States	
Slalom	LW5/7	Gerd Schoenfelder; Germany	Josef Orlitsch; Austria	Niko Moll; Germany
Slalom	LW6/8	Meinhard Tatschl; Austria	Jeremy Babcock; United States	Stanislav Loska; Czech Republic
Slalom	LW9	Arno Hirschbuehl; Austria	Tristan Mouric; France	Eberhard Seischab; Germany
Slalom	LWX	Chris Waddell; United States	Reinhold Sager; Austria	Takashi Kurosu; Japan
Slalom	LWXI	Michael Norton; Australia	Ryuei Shinohe; Japan	William Bowness; United States
Slalom	LWXII	Ludovic Rey-Robert; France	Thomas Weiss; Germany	Toshihiko Takamura; Japan

=== Women's events ===
Event	Class	Gold	Silver	Bronze
Downhill	B1-2	Joanne Duffy; New Zealand	Magda Amo; Spain	Izaskun Manuel Llados; Spain
Downhill	LW2	Sarah Billmeier; United States	Helga Erhart; Austria	Beate Salen; Germany
Downhill	LW3/4	Reinhild Moeller; Germany	Renate Hjortland; Norway	Lana Spreeman; Canada
Downhill	LW6/8	Nancy Gustafson; United States	Nadja Obrist; Austria	Ramona Hoh; Canada
Downhill	LWX-XII	Sarah Will; United States	Kelley Fox; United States	Gerda Pamler; Germany
Super-G	B1-2	Gabriele Huemer; Austria	Elisabeth Kellner; Austria	Joanne Duffy; New Zealand
Super-G	LW2	Sarah Billmeier; United States	Beate Salen; Germany	Adrienne Rivera; United States
Super-G	LW3/4	Reinhild Moeller; Germany	Renate Hjortland; Norway	Lana Spreeman; Canada
Super-G	LW6/8	Nancy Gustafson; United States	Nadja Obrist; Austria	Dagmar Vollmer; Germany
Super-G	LWX-XII	Sarah Will; United States	Gerda Pamler; Germany	Stephanie Riche; France
Giant slalom	B1-2	Elisabeth Kellner; Austria	Gabriele Huemer; Austria	Asa Bengtsson; Sweden
Giant slalom	LW2	Adrienne Rivera; United States	Helga Erhart; Austria	Annemie Schneider; Germany
Giant slalom	LW3/4	Reinhild Moeller; Germany	Renate Hjortland; Norway	Lana Spreeman; Canada
Giant slalom	LW6/8	Nancy Gustafson; United States	Dagmar Vollmer; Germany	Nadja Obrist; Austria
Giant slalom	LWX-XII	Gerda Pamler; Germany	Vreni Stoeckli; Switzerland	Stephanie Riche; France
Slalom	B1-2	Asa Bengtsson; Sweden	Izaskun Manuel Llados; Spain	Silvia Parente; Italy
Slalom	LW2	Helga Erhart; Austria	Sarah Billmeier; United States	Beate Salen; Germany
Slalom	LW3/4	Reinhild Moeller; Germany	Lana Spreeman; Canada	Carmen Haderer; Austria
Slalom	LW6/8	Nancy Gustafson; United States	Ramona Hoh; Canada	Marcela Misunova; Slovakia
Slalom	LWX-XII	Sarah Will; United States	Kelley Fox; United States	Vreni Stoeckli; Switzerland

== See also ==
- Alpine skiing at the 1994 Winter Olympics
