= Cross-country skiing at the 1994 Winter Paralympics =

1994 Winter Paralympics competition

Cross-country skiing at the VI Paralympic Winter Games

Cross-country skiing at the 1994 Winter Paralympics consisted of 48 events, 29 for men and 19 for women.

== Medal table ==
Rank	Nation	Gold medal	Silver medal	Bronze medal	Total
1	Norway (NOR)	17	9	3	29
2	Germany (GER)	11	7	3	21
3	Russia (RUS)	9	9	7	25
4	Finland (FIN)	6	7	10	23
5	France (FRA)	3	1	3	7
6	Poland (POL)	2	3	5	10
7	Austria (AUT)	0	3	3	6
8	Switzerland (SUI)	0	3	2	5
9	United States (USA)	0	3	1	4
10	Italy (ITA)	0	1	3	4
11	Sweden (SWE)	0	1	1	2
12	Kazakhstan (KAZ)	0	1	0	1
13	Netherlands (NED)	0	0	3	3
14	Denmark (DEN)	0	0	2	2
15	Estonia (EST)	0	0	1	1
15	Great Britain (GBR)	0	0	1	1
Total		48	48	48	144

== Medal summary ==
The competition events were:

- 2.5 km: - women
- 5 km: men - women
- 10 km: men - women
- 15 km: men
- 20 km: men
- 3x2.5 km relay: men - women
- 4x5 km relay: men

Each event had separate standing, sitting, or visually impaired classifications:

- LW2 - standing: single leg amputation above the knee
- LW3 - standing: double leg amputation below the knee, mild cerebral palsy, or equivalent impairment
- LW4 - standing: single leg amputation below the knee
- LW5/7 - standing: double arm amputation
- LW6/8 - standing: single arm amputation
- LW9 - standing: amputation or equivalent impairment of one arm and one leg
- LW 10 - sitting: paraplegia with no or some upper abdominal function and no functional sitting balance
- LW 11 - sitting: paraplegia with fair functional sitting balance
- B1 - visually impaired: no functional vision
- B2 - visually impaired: up to ca 3-5% functional vision
- B3 - visually impaired: under 10% functional vision

=== Men's events ===
Event	Class	Gold	Silver	Bronze
5 km classical technique	B1	Terje Løvaas; Norway	Magne Lunde; Norway	Peter Young; Great Britain
5 km classical technique	B2	Frank Höfle; Germany	Torbjörn Ek; Sweden	Timo Kalevi Lahtinen; Finland
5 km classical technique	B3	Alexander Schwarz; Germany	Alexandre Nassarouline; Russia	Nikolai Ilioutchenko; Russia
5 km classical technique	LW2/3/9	Wiggo Nordseth; Norway	Jan Kolodziej; Poland	Samuli Kaemi; Finland
5 km classical technique	LW4	Åge Jønsberg; Norway	Svein Lilleberg; Norway	Wolfgang Mahler; Germany
5 km classical technique	LW5/7	Axel Hecker; Germany	Marcin Kos; Poland	Jerzy Szlezak; Poland
5 km classical technique	LW6/8	Jouko Grip; Finland	Thomas Ölsner; Germany	Rauno Miettinen; Finland
5 km sitski	LW10	Didier Riedlinger; France	Jeff Pagels; United States	Oliver Anthofer; Austria
5 km sitski	LW11	Kari Joki-Erkkila; Finland	Teuvo Ojala; Finland	Seppo Joensuu; Finland
10 km free technique	B1	Terje Løvaas; Norway	Valeri Kouptchinski; Russia	Serguei Seleznev; Russia
10 km free technique	B2	Frank Höfle; Germany	Valeri Cheloudkov; Russia	Herve Le Moing; France
10 km free technique	B3	Alexandre Nassarouline; Russia	Alexander Schwarz; Germany	Nikolai Ilioutchenko; Russia
10 km free technique	LW2/3/9	Roland Gäss; Germany	Svein Lilleberg; Norway	Ernesto Vinante; Italy
10 km free technique	LW4	Åge Jønsberg; Norway	Andre Favre; France	Kalervo Pieksaemaeki; Finland
10 km free technique	LW5/7	Marcin Kos; Poland	Axel Hecker; Germany	Jerzy Szlezak; Poland
10 km free technique	LW6/8	Thomas Ölsner; Germany	Bernhard Furrer; Switzerland	Jean-Yves Arvier; France
10 km sitski	LW10	Didier Riedlinger; France	Jeff Pagels; United States	Franco Belletti; Switzerland
10 km sitski	LW11	Kari Joki-Erkkila; Finland	Knut Lundstrøm; Norway	Teuvo Ojala; Finland
15 km sitski	LW10	Didier Riedlinger; France	Jeff Pagels; United States	Oliver Anthofer; Austria
15 km sitski	LW11	Knut Lundstrøm; Norway	Michael Weymann; Germany	Kari Joki-Erkkila; Finland
20 km classical technique	B1	Terje Løvaas; Norway	Valeri Kouptchinski; Russia	Magne Lunde; Norway
20 km classical technique	B2	Frank Höfle; Germany	Timo Kalevi Lahtinen; Finland	Valeri Cheloudkov; Russia
20 km classical technique	B3	Alexandre Nassarouline; Russia	Nikolai Ilioutchenko; Russia	Alexander Schwarz; Germany
20 km classical technique	LW2/3/9	Wiggo Nordseth; Norway	Piotr Sulkowski; Poland	Jan Kolodziej; Poland
20 km classical technique	LW4	Åge Jønsberg; Norway	Svein Lilleberg; Norway	Kalervo Pieksaemaeki; Finland
20 km classical technique	LW5/7	Marcin Kos; Poland	Axel Hecker; Germany	Jerzy Szlezak; Poland
20 km classical technique	LW6/8	Thomas Oelsner; Germany	Jouko Grip; Finland	Jean-Yves Arvier; France
3×2.5 km relay	sitting	Norway (NOR); John-Olav Johansen; Terje Johansen; Knut Lundstrøm	Finland (FIN); Kari Joki-Erkkila; Teuvo Ojala; Raimo Peltonen	Germany (GER); Klaus Kleiser; Michael Weymann; Bruno Zimmermann
4×5 km relay	standing/ blind	Norway (NOR); Åge Jønsberg; Svein Lilleberg; Terje Løvaas; Wiggo Nordseth	Germany (GER); Axel Hecker; Frank Höfle; Wolfgang Mahler; Thomas Ölsner	Russia (RUS); Nikolai Ilioutchenko; Valeri Kouptchinski; Alexandre Nassarouline; Serguei Seleznev

=== Women's events ===
Event	Class	Gold	Silver	Bronze
2.5 km sitski	LW10-11	Ragnhild Myklebust; Norway	Kirsti Hooeen; Norway	Dorothea Agetle; Italy
5 km classical technique	B1	Lubov Paninykii; Russia	Irina Selivanova; Russia	Anne-Mette Bredahl-Christensen; Denmark
5 km classical technique	B2	Nadezhda Chirkova; Russia	Renata Hoenisch; Austria	Anne-Lie Gustafsson; Sweden
5 km classical technique	B3	Kaija Tuikkanen; Finland	Alevtina Yelesina; Russia	Vilma Nugis; Estonia
5 km classical technique	LW2/3/4	Susanne Ischinger; Germany	Gabriele Buchegger; Austria	Theres Huser; Switzerland
5 km classical technique	LW6/8/9	Tanja Tervonen; Finland	Siw Vestengen; Norway	Marjorie van de Bunt; Netherlands
5 km free technique	B1	Lubov Paninykii; Russia	Irina Selivanova; Russia	Michele Drolet; United States
5 km free technique	B2	Tone Gravvold; Norway	Renata Hoenisch; Austria	Nadezhda Chirkova; Russia
5 km free technique	B3	Alevtina Yelesina; Russia	Sisko Kiiski; Finland	Kaija Tuikkanen; Finland
5 km free technique	LW2/3/4	Susanne Ischinger; Germany	Theres Huser; Switzerland	Gabriele Buchegger; Austria
5 km free technique	LW6/8/9	Tanja Tervonen; Finland	Anne Helene Barlund; Norway	Marjorie van de Bunt; Netherlands
5 km sitski	LW10-11	Ragnhild Myklebust; Norway	Kirsti Hooeen; Norway	Dorothea Agetle; Italy
10 km classical technique	B1	Lubov Paninykii; Russia	Irina Selivanova; Russia	Anne-Mette Bredahl-Christensen; Denmark
10 km classical technique	B2	Nadezhda Chirkova; Russia	Lubov Vorobieva; Kazakhstan	Tone Gravvold; Norway
10 km classical technique	B3	Kaija Tuikkanen; Finland	Alevtina Elessina; Russia	Sisko Kiiski; Finland
10 km classical technique	LW2/3/4	Susanne Ischinger; Germany	Theres Huser; Switzerland	Zenona Baniewicz; Poland
10 km classical technique	LW6/8/9	Anne Helene Barlund; Norway	Tanja Tervonen; Finland	Marjorie van de Bunt; Netherlands
10 km sitski	LW10-11	Ragnhild Myklebust; Norway	Dorothea Agetle; Italy	Kirsti Hooeen; Norway
3×2.5 km relay	open	Norway (NOR); Anne Helene Barlund; Ragnhild Myklebust; Siw Vestengen	Germany (GER); Michaela Fuchs; Susanne Ischinger; Martina Willing	Russia (RUS); Alevtina Yelesina; Lubov Paninykii; Nadezhda Chirkova

== See also ==
- Cross-country skiing at the 1994 Winter Olympics
