= Vreni Stöckli =

Swiss paralympian

Personal information
- Born: 1953 (age 72–73) Stoos, Switzerland

Sport
- Country: Switzerland
- Sport: Alpine skiing
Medal record
Alpine skiing
Representing Switzerland
Paralympic Games
Silver medal – second place	1994 Lillehammer	Giant slalom LWX-XII
Silver medal – second place	1998 Nagano	Giant slalom LW10-11
Bronze medal – third place	1994 Lillehammer	Slalom LWX-XII

Vreni Stöckli (born 1953) is a Swiss paralympic alpine skier. She represented Switzerland in three Paralympic Winter Games, winner of two silver medals and one bronze medal.

== Career ==
At the 1994 Winter Paralympics, in Lillehammer, Stöckli placed third in the slalom race category LWX-XII1, with 2:40.71, behind the Americans Sarah Will with a time of 2:14.56 and Kelley Fox with 2:27.24. She won a silver medal in the giant slalom with a time of 3:25.64. On the podium, was compatriot Gerda Pamler winning gold, in 3:12.39, and French Stephanie Riche winning bronze in 3:27.20.

At the 1998 Winter Paralympic Games in Nagano, Stöckli placed 2nd in giant slalom, finishing the race in 2:57.68, behind Sarah Will in 2:35.09; and ahead of Kuniko Obinata in 2:58.97.

At the 2002 Paralympic Winter Games in Salt Lake City, Vreni Stöckli finished sixth in the giant slalom category LW10-11, with a time of 2:55.95, and she was eighth in the super-G LW10-12, with a time of 1:30.72.
