= Biathlon at the 1994 Winter Paralympics =

Biathlon at the VI Paralympic Winter Games

Biathlon at the 1994 Winter Paralympics consisted of ten events.

== Medal table ==
Rank	Nation	Gold medal	Silver medal	Bronze medal	Total
1	Germany (GER)	3	3	5	11
2	France (FRA)	2	1	0	3
3	Norway (NOR)	2	0	3	5
4	Russia (RUS)	1	2	0	3
5	Denmark (DEN)	1	0	0	1
5	Netherlands (NED)	1	0	0	1
7	Switzerland (SUI)	0	3	1	4
8	Sweden (SWE)	0	1	0	1
9	Finland (FIN)	0	0	1	1
Total		10	10	10	30

== Medal summary ==
The competition event was:

- 7.5 km: men - women

The event had separate standing, sitting, or visually impaired classifications:

- LW2 - standing: single leg amputation above the knee
- LW3 - standing: double leg amputation below the knee, mild cerebral palsy, or equivalent impairment
- LW4 - standing: single leg amputation below the knee
- LW5/7 - standing: double arm amputation
- LW6/8 - standing: single arm amputation
- LW9 - standing: amputation or equivalent impairment of one arm and one leg
- LW 10 - sitting: paraplegia with no or some upper abdominal function and no functional sitting balance
- LW 11 - sitting: paraplegia with fair functional sitting balance
- B1 - visually impaired: no functional vision
- B2 - visually impaired: up to ca 3-5% functional vision
- B3 - visually impaired: under 10% functional vision

=== Men's events ===
Event	Class	Gold	Silver	Bronze
7.5 km free technique	B1	Udo Hirsch; Germany	Wilhelm Brem; Germany	Morten Tollefsen; Norway
7.5 km free technique	B2	Frank Höfle; Germany	Torbjörn Ek; Sweden	Adrian Mosimann; Switzerland
7.5 km free technique	B3	Alexandre Nassarouline; Russia	Nikolai Ilioutchenko; Russia	Alexander Schwarz; Germany
7.5 km free technique	LW2/3/9	Wiggo Nordseth; Norway	Roland Gäss; Germany	Svein Lilleberg; Norway
7.5 km free technique	LW4	Åge Jønsberg; Norway	Andre Favre; France	Wolfgang Mahler; Germany
7.5 km free technique	LW5-8	Thomas Ölsner; Germany	Theo Feger; Germany	Josef Gattinger; Germany
7.5 km sitski	LW10	Didier Riedlinger; France	Franco Belletti; Switzerland	Klaus Kleiser; Germany
7.5 km sitski	LW11	Omar Bouyoucef; France	Rüdi Weber; Switzerland	Teuvo Ojala; Finland

=== Women's events ===
Event	Class	Gold	Silver	Bronze
7.5 km free technique	B1-3	Anne-Mette Bredahl-Christensen; Denmark	Lubov Paninykii; Russia	Martina Willing; Germany
7.5 km free technique	LW2-9	Marjorie van de Bunt; Netherlands	Theres Huser; Switzerland	Ragnhild Myklebust; Norway

== See also ==
- Biathlon at the 1994 Winter Olympics
