= Izaskun Manuel =

Spanish Paralympic alpine skier

Personal information
- Full name: Izaskun Manuel Llados
- Born: 28 November 1970 (age 55) Biscay, Spain

Sport
- Country: Spain
- Sport: Alpine skiing
- Disability class: B2
Medal record
Alpine skiing
Representing Spain
Paralympic Games
Silver medal – second place	1994 Lillehammer	Slalom B2
Bronze medal – third place	1994 Lillehammer	Downhill B2

Izaskun Manuel Llados is a Spanish Paralympic alpine skier. She competed in the 1994 Paralympic Winter Games in Lillehammer. She won two medals, one silver and one bronze.

== Career ==
At the 1994 Winter Paralympics in Lillehammer, she finished second in the slalom race, in a time of 2:38.84; on the podium, in 1st place the Swedish athlete Åsa Bengtsson in 2: 14.24 and in 3rd place the Italian athlete Silvia Parente in 4: 09.33. She finished third in the downhill race, in 1:38.74, behind New Zealander Joanne Duffy in 1: 28.58 and compatriot Magda Amo in 1:37.87. She also competed in other events, finishing seventh in the giant slalom with a time of 3: 21.07, and eighth in the supergiant in 1: 41.82.
