= Kelley Fox =

American Paralympic alpine skier

Personal information
- Born: 1968 (age 57–58) Denver, Colorado, United States

Sport
- Country: United States
- Sport: Alpine skiing
Medal record
Alpine skiing
Representing United States
Paralympic Games
Silver medal – second place	1994 Lillehammer	Downhill LWX-XII
Silver medal – second place	1994 Lillehammer	Slalom LWX-XII

Kelley Fox (born 1968) is an American Paralympic alpine skier. She represented the United States in Paralympic Alpine skiing at the 1994 Paralympic Winter Games in Lillehammer. She won two silver medals.

== Career ==
At the 1994 Winter Paralympics, in Lillehammer, Norway, Fox finished 2nd in the slalom LWX-XII, with a time of 2: 27.24, behind of her compatriot Sarah Will, who won gold in 2:14.56 and in front of Swiss Vreni Stoeckli, who won bronze in 2:40.71. Fox finished second, winning the silver medal, with a time of 1: 34.55, in the downhill LWX-XII. On the podium, in 1st place, was Sarah Will (in 1: 30.46) and in 3rd place the German Gerda Pamler (in 1:34.55).

She competed at the 1996 Para-alpine World Championships in Lech, Austria, winning a gold medal.

She competed at the 2016 Adaptive Spirit race.
