= Helga Erhart =

Austrian para-alpine skier

Sport
- Country: Austria
- Sport: Para-alpine skiing
Medal record
Paralympic Games
Gold medal – first place	1994 Lillehammer	Slalom LW2
Silver medal – second place	1994 Lillehammer	Giant Slalom LW2
Silver medal – second place	1994 Lillehammer	Downhill LW2

Helga Erhart is an Austrian para-alpine skier. She represented Austria at the 1994 Winter Paralympics. In total, she won three medals: one gold medal and two silver medals.

She won the gold medal at the Women's Slalom LW2 event and the silver medals at the Women's Giant Slalom LW2 and the Women's Downhill LW2 events.

== See also ==
- List of Paralympic medalists in alpine skiing
