= Hjortland =

Hjortland is a Norwegian surname, and the name of a town near Bergen, Norway. Notable people with the surname include:

- Marthana Hjortland (1929–2025), American dietician and biostatistician
- Renate Hjortland, Norwegian Paralympic skier
