= Poland at the 1994 Winter Paralympics =

- IPC code: POL
- NPC: Polish Paralympic Committee
- Website: www.paralympic.org.pl

in Lillehammer
- Competitors: 15 in 3 sports
- Medals Ranked 12th: Gold 2 Silver 3 Bronze 5 Total 10

Winter Paralympics appearances (overview)
- 1976; 1980; 1984; 1988; 1992; 1994; 1998; 2002; 2006; 2010; 2014; 2018; 2022; 2026

Poland competed at the 1994 Winter Paralympics in Lillehammer, Norway. 15 competitors from Poland won 10 medals including 2 gold, 3 silver and 5 bronze and finished 12th in the medal table.

== Medalists ==
=== Gold ===
- Marcin Kos - Cross-country skiing, Standing 10 km Individual Free LW5/7
- Marcin Kos - Cross-country skiing, Standing 20 km Individual Classic LW5/7

=== Silver ===
- Piotr Sulkowski - Cross-country skiing, Standing 20 km Individual Classic LW2/3/9
- Jan Kołodziej - Cross-country skiing, Standing 5 km Individual Classic LW2/3/9
- Marcin Kos - Cross-country skiing, Standing 5 km Individual Classic LW5/7

=== Bronze ===
- Zenona Baniewicz - Cross-country skiing, Standing 10 km Individual Classic LW2/3/4
- Jan Kołodziej - Cross-country skiing, Standing 20 km Individual Classic LW2/3/9
- Jerzy Szlezak - Cross-country skiing, Standing 5 km Individual Classic LW5/7
- Jerzy Szlezak - Cross-country skiing, Standing 10 km Individual Free LW5/7
- Jerzy Szlezak - Cross-country skiing, Standing 20 km Individual Classic LW5/7

== Alpine skiing ==
Athlete	Event	Final			
Athlete	Event	Run	Rank	Calculated Time	Rank
Janusz Hojka	Slalom LW4	DNF		DNF	
Janusz Hojka	Giant slalom LW4	DSQ		DNF	
Janusz Hojka	Super gigant LW4	1:36.82	13	1:36.82	13
Maciej Rakowski	Slalom LW5/7	DNF		DNF	
Maciej Rakowski	Giant slalom LW5/7	DNF		DNF	
Maciej Rakowski	Super gigant LW5/7	1:38.65	9	1:38.65	9
Tomasz Tasiemski	Slalom LWX	DNF		DNF	
Tomasz Tasiemski	Giant slalom LWX	DSQ		DNF	
Tomasz Tasiemski	Super gigant LWX	DNF		DNF	
Janusz Wasil	Slalom LW4	DNF		DNF	
Janusz Wasil	Giant slalom LW4	DNF		DNF	
Janusz Wasil	Super gigant LW4	1:31.73	12	1:31.73	12

== Biathlon ==
Athlete	Events	Final				
Athlete	Events	Time	Misses	Factor	Finish time	Rank
Zenona Baniewicz	Sitting Pursuit LW2-9	38:05.0	3	97	39:10.2	7
Marian Damian	Sitting Pursuit LW5-8	29:54.2	0	95	31:28.7	16
Jarosław Dąbrowski	Sitting Pursuit LW2/3/9	29:49.7	2	87	33:59.2	5
Krystyna Jagodzińska	Sitting Pursuit LW2-9	38:19.5	2	95	40:14.3	8
Jan Kołodziej	Sitting Pursuit LW2/3/9	28:42.0	1	84	33:58.6	4
Marcin Koś	Sitting Pursuit LW5-8	28:04.8	0	90	31:12.0	9
Andrzej Pietrzyk	Sitting Pursuit LW5-8	28:34.9	0	95	30:05.2	11
Beata Pomietło	Sitting Pursuit LW2-9	37:39.1	1	84	44:38.0	6
Piotr Sulkowski	Sitting Pursuit LW2/3/9	29:52.6	2	84	35:11.2	6
Jerzy Szlęzak	Sitting Pursuit LW5-8	34:57.7	4	90	38:24.2	21
Jarosław Wiśniewski	Sitting Pursuit LW5-8	33:28.6	4	90	36:45.2	20

== Cross‑country skiing ==
Athlete	Event	Final			
Athlete	Event	Real Time	Factor	Finish Time	Rank
Zenona Baniewicz	Standing 5 km Classic LW2/3/4	20:23.4	97	21:01.3	4
Zenona Baniewicz	Standing 5 km Free LW2/3/4	0:17:19.6	97	17:51.8	4
Zenona Baniewicz	Standing 10 km Classic LW2/3/4	0:57:41.2	97	59:28.3	3rd place, bronze medalist(s)
Jarosław Dąbrowski	Standing 5 km Classic LW2/3/9	16:41.6	92	18:08.7	8
Jarosław Dąbrowski	Standing 10 km Free LW2/3/9	0:30:05.1	87	34:34.9	7
Jarosław Dąbrowski	Standing 20 km Classic LW2/3/9	1:04:26.3	92	70:02.5	9
Marian Damian	Standing 5 km Classic LW6/8	16:30.3	92	17:56.5	15
Marian Damian	Standing 10 km Free LW6/8	0:31:47.2	95	33:27.6	16
Marian Damian	Sitting 15 km Classic LW10-12	DNF			
Krystyna Jagodzińska	Standing 5 km Classic LW6/8/9	21:44.9	92	23:38.4	5
Krystyna Jagodzińska	Standing 5 km Free LW6/8/9	0:17:52.5	95	18:49.0	5
Krystyna Jagodzińska	Standing 10 km Classic LW6/8/9	1:06:24.2	92	72:10.7	4
Jan Kołodziej	Standing 5 km Classic LW2/3/9	14:34.1	87	16:44.8	2nd place, silver medalist(s)
Jan Kołodziej	Standing 10 km Free LW2/3/9	0:30:22.6	84	36:09.8	8
Jan Kołodziej	Standing 20 km Classic LW2/3/9	0:58:43.4	87	67:29.9	3rd place, bronze medalist(s)
Marcin Kos	Standing 5 km Classic LW5/7	13:48.5	77	17:56.0	2nd place, silver medalist(s)
Marcin Kos	Standing 10 km Free LW5/7	0:27:14.9	90	30:16.6	1st place, gold medalist(s)
Marcin Kos	Standing 20 km Classic LW5/7	0:54:53.5	77	71:17.3	1st place, gold medalist(s)
Andrzej Pietrzyk	Standing 5 km Classic LW6/8	14:56.6	92	16:14.6	8
Andrzej Pietrzyk	Standing 10 km Free LW6/8	0:29:53.5	95	31:27.9	11
Andrzej Pietrzyk	Standing 20 km Free LW2-9	DNF			
Beata Pomietło	Standing 5 km Classic LW2/3/4	20:46.6	87	23:52.9	6
Beata Pomietło	Standing 5 km Free LW2/3/4	0:18:20.1	84	21:49.7	5
Beata Pomietło	Standing 10 km Classic LW2/3/4	DNF			
Piotr Sulkowski	Standing 5 km Classic LW2/3/9	15:16.6	87	17:33.6	4
Piotr Sulkowski	Standing 10 km Free LW2/3/9	0:31:35.0	84	37:36.0	10
Piotr Sulkowski	Standing 20 km Classic LW2/3/9	0:58:19.0	87	67:01.9	2nd place, silver medalist(s)
Jerzy Szlezak	Standing 5 km Classic LW5/7	15:04.6	77	19:34.9	3rd place, bronze medalist(s)
Jerzy Szlezak	Standing 10 km Free LW5/7	0:30:23.3	90	33:45.9	3rd place, bronze medalist(s)
Jerzy Szlezak	Standing 20 km Classic LW5/7	0:56:55.7	77	73:56.0	3rd place, bronze medalist(s)
Jarosław Wiśniewski	Standing 5 km Classic LW5/7	16:19.6	77	21:12.3	6
Jarosław Wiśniewski	Standing 10 km Free LW5/7	0:31:26.0	90	34:55.6	4
Jarosław Wiśniewski	Standing 20 km Classic LW5/7	DNF			

== See also ==
- Poland at the Paralympics
- Poland at the 1994 Winter Olympics
