= Czech Republic at the 1994 Winter Paralympics =

- IPC code: CZE
- NPC: Czech Paralympic Committee
- Website: www.paralympic.cz

in Lillehammer
- Competitors: 6 in 3 sports
- Medals Ranked 22nd: Gold 0 Silver 0 Bronze 1 Total 1

Winter Paralympics appearances (overview)
- 1994; 1998; 2002; 2006; 2010; 2014; 2018; 2022; 2026

Other related appearances
- Czechoslovakia (1976–1992)

The Czech Republic competed at the 1994 Winter Paralympics in Lillehammer, Norway. Six competitors from the Czech Republic won a single bronze medal. The country finished joint 22nd (last place) in the medal table with Belgium, Estonia and Liechtenstein.

== Medalists ==
Medal	Name	Sport	Event
Bronze	Stanislav Loska	Alpine skiing	Men's Slalom LW6/8

== Competitors ==
The following is the list of number of competitors participating at the Games per sport/discipline.

Sport	Men	Women	Total
Alpine skiing	5	0	5
Biathlon	1	0	1
Cross-country skiing	1	0	1
Total	6	0	6

== Alpine skiing ==
5 athletes competed in alpine skiing.

Men

Athlete	Events	Final	
Athlete	Events	Time	Rank
Stanislav Loska	Men's Downhill LW6/8	DNF	
Stanislav Loska	Men's Super-G LW6/8	1:20.13	11
Stanislav Loska	Men's Giant slalom LW6/8	2:19.47	7
Stanislav Loska	Men's Slalom LW6/8	1:22.38	Bronze medal
Petr Cabadaj	Men's Downhill LW5/7	1:23.57	6
Petr Cabadaj	Men's Super-G LW5/7	1:26.14	6
Petr Cabadaj	Men's Giant slalom LW5/7	2:39.17	7
Petr Cabadaj	Men's slalom LW9	DNF	
Vladislav Urban	Men's Downhill LW6/8	1:25.11	15
Vladislav Urban	Men's Super-G LW6/8	1:21.49	16
Vladislav Urban	Men's Giant slalom LW6/8	2:32.98	18
Vladislav Urban	Men's Slalom LW6/8	1:31.89	7
Karel Bařinka	Men's Downhill LW4	1:24.32	8
Karel Bařinka	Men's Super-G LW4	1:23.73	10
Karel Bařinka	Men's Giant slalom LW4	2:39.44	9
Karel Bařinka	Men's Slalom LW4	DNF	
Michal Stark	Men's Downhill LW2	DNS	
Michal Stark	Men's Super-G LW2	1:34.49	23
Michal Stark	Men's Giant slalom LW2	2:51.73	17
Michal Stark	Men's Slalom LW2	DSQ	

== Biathlon ==
1 athlete competed in Biathlon.

Men

Athlete	Events	Final	
Athlete	Events	Time	Rank
Marek Šimíček	Men's 7,5 km B1	29:47.8	6

== Cross-country skiing ==
1 athlete competed in cross-country skiing.

Men

Athlete	Events	Final	
Athlete	Events	Time	Rank
Marek Šimíček	Men's 20 km Classical Technique B1	1:05:11.0	14
Marek Šimíček	Men's 10 km Free Technique B1	27:38.10	10
Marek Šimíček	Men's 5 km Classical Technique B1	16:20.70	12

== See also ==
- Czech Republic at the Paralympics
- Czech Republic at the 1994 Winter Olympics
