= Boesiger =

Boesiger or Bösiger is a surname. Notable people with the surname include:

- Christian Bösiger (born 1984), Swiss badminton player
- Johannes Boesiger (born 1962), German writer and producer
- Roy Boesiger (fl. 1990s), Swiss para-alpine skier
