= Nadja Obrist =

Austrian Paralympic alpine skier

Personal information
- Born: 4 November 1972 (age 53)

Sport
- Country: Austria
- Sport: Alpine skiing
Medal record
Alpine skiing
Representing Austria
Paralympic Games
Silver medal – second place	1994 Lillehammer	Downhill LW6/8
Silver medal – second place	1994 Lillehammer	Super-G LW6/8
Silver medal – second place	1998 Nagano	Slalom LW3,4,5/7,6/8
Bronze medal – third place	1994 Lillehammer	Giant slalom LW6/8
Bronze medal – third place	1998 Nagano	Downhill LW3,4,6/8

Nadja Obrist (born 4 November 1972) is an Austrian Paralympic alpine skier. She represented Austria in Paralympic Alpine skiing at the 1994 Paralympic Winter Games in Lillehammer and 1998 Paralympic Winter Games in Nagano. She won five medals: three medals silver and two bronze.

== Career ==
At the 1994 Paralympic Winter Games in Lillehammer, Norway, Obrist won three medals: two silver medals, in the downhill LW6/8, and super-G LW6/8, and a bronze in the giant slalom LW6/8. She placed fourth in the slalom LW6/8.

At the 1998 Paralympic Winter Games, at Nagano Japan, Obrist won silver in the slalom LW3,4,5/7,6/8, and bronze in the downhill LW3,4,6/8. She finished fourth in the giant slalom, and sixth in the super-G LW3,4,5 / 7,6 / 8.
