= Leopold Ertl =

Austrian para-alpine skier

Sport
- Country: Austria
- Sport: Para-alpine skiing
Medal record
Paralympic Games
Bronze medal – third place	1994 Lillehammer	Giant Slalom B1

Leopold Ertl is an Austrian para-alpine skier. He represented Austria at the 1992 Winter Paralympics, at the 1994 Winter Paralympics and at the 1998 Winter Paralympics. He won the bronze medal in the Men's Giant Slalom B1 event at the 1994 Winter Paralympics.

== See also ==
- List of Paralympic medalists in alpine skiing
