= Hannes Huettenbrenner =

Austrian para-alpine skier

Sport
- Country: Austria
- Sport: Para-alpine skiing
Medal record
Paralympic Games
Gold medal – first place	1994 Lillehammer	Downhill LW6/8
Bronze medal – third place	1994 Lillehammer	Giant Slalom LW6/8

Hannes Huettenbrenner is an Austrian para-alpine skier. He represented Austria in alpine skiing at the 1994 Winter Paralympics.

He won the gold medal in the Men's Downhill LW6/8 event and the bronze medal in the Men's Giant Slalom LW6/8 event.

== See also ==
- List of Paralympic medalists in alpine skiing
