= Josef Orlitsch =

Austrian para-alpine skier

Sport
- Country: Austria
- Sport: Para-alpine skiing
Medal record
Paralympic Games
| Silver medal – second place | 1994 Lillehammer | Slalom LW5/7 |

Josef Orlitsch is an Austrian para-alpine skier. He represented Austria at the 1994 Winter Paralympics and at the 1998 Winter Paralympics in alpine skiing.

He won the silver medal at the Men's Slalom skiing LW5/7 event at the 1994 Winter Paralympics.

== See also ==
- List of Paralympic medalists in alpine skiing
