= Ramona Hoh =

Canadian para-alpine skier (born 1979)

Personal information
- Full name: Ramona Amy Hoh
- Born: 1979 (age 46–47)
- Home town: Edmonton, Alberta
- Education: Dartmouth College; Stanford University

Sport
- Country: Canada
- Sport: Alpine skiing
Medal record
Paralympic Games
| Silver medal – second place | 1994 Lillehammer | Slalom LW6/8 |
| Bronze medal – third place | 1994 Lillehammer | Downhill LW6/8 |
| Bronze medal – third place | 1998 Nagano | Giant Slalom LW3,4,5/7,6/8 |

Ramona Amy Hoh (born 1979) is a Canadian former para-alpine skier from Edmonton. She won a silver and a bronze medal at the 1994 Winter Paralympics, and a bronze medal at the 1998 Winter Paralympics.

Ramona Hoh was born without fingers on her right hand. She is an alumna of Dartmouth College and currently works as a molecular biologist at Stanford University, where she also received her Ph.D.
