= Liechtenstein at the 2026 Winter Paralympics =

- Flag of Liechtenstein
- IPC code: LIE
- NPC: Liechtensteiner Behindertensport-Verband

in Milan & Cortina d'Ampezzo, Italy 6 March 2026 – 15 March 2026
- Competitors: 1 (1 woman) in 1 sport
- Medals: Gold 0 Silver 0 Bronze 0 Total 0

Winter Paralympics appearances (overview)
- 1992; 1994; 1998–2018; 2022; 2026

Liechtenstein competed at the 2026 Winter Paralympics in Milan & Cortina d'Ampezzo, Italy, which took place between 6–15 March 2026.

== Competitors ==
The following is the list of number of competitors participating at the Games per sport/discipline.

Sport	Men	Women	Total
Para alpine skiing	0	1	1
Total	0	1	1

== Para alpine skiing ==
Athlete	Class	Event	Run 1		Run 2		Total	
Athlete	Class	Event	Time	Rank	Time	Rank	Time	Rank
Sarah Hundert	LW10–2	Women's giant slalom, sitting	DNF					
Sarah Hundert	LW10–2	Women's slalom, sitting	1:01.01	14	58.88	11	1:59.89	13

== See also ==
- Liechtenstein at the Paralympics
- Liechtenstein at the 2026 Winter Olympics
