= Franz Czuk =

Austrian para-alpine skier

Sport
- Country: Austria
- Sport: Para-alpine skiing
Medal record
Paralympic Games
Silver medal – second place	1994 Lillehammer	Giant Slalom B1

Franz Czuk is an Austrian para-alpine skier. He represented Austria in alpine skiing at the 1994 Winter Paralympics.

He won the silver medal in the Men's Giant Slalom B1 event.

He also competed in the Men's Super-G B1 event but did not finish.

== See also ==
- List of Paralympic medalists in alpine skiing
