= Peter Poetscher =

Austrian para-alpine skier

Sport
- Country: Austria
- Sport: Para-alpine skiing
Medal record
Paralympic Games
Bronze medal – third place	1994 Lillehammer	Downhill LW1/3

Peter Poetscher is an Austrian para-alpine skier. He represented Austria at the 1994 Winter Paralympics and he competed in four events in alpine skiing:

- Men's Downhill LW1/3
- Men's Slalom LW1/3
- Men's Super-G LW1/3
- Men's Giant Slalom LW1/3

He won the bronze medal at the Men's Downhill LW1/3 event.

== See also ==
- List of Paralympic medalists in alpine skiing
