= Gerda Pamler =

German Paralympic alpine skier

Personal information
- Born: 1958 (age 67–68) Munich, Germany

Sport
- Country: Germany
- Sport: Alpine skiing
Medal record
Alpine skiing
Representing Germany
Paralympic Games
Gold medal – first place	1992 Albertville	Slalom LW10-11
Gold medal – first place	1994 Lillehammer	Giant slalom LWX-XII
Silver medal – second place	1992 Albertville	Downhill LW10-11
Silver medal – second place	1992 Albertville	Super-G LW10-11
Silver medal – second place	1994 Lillehammer	Super-G LWX-XII
Bronze medal – third place	1994 Lillehammer	Downhill LWX-XII

Gerda Pamler (born 1958) is a German former Paralympic alpine skier and artist. She competed at the 1992, 1994 and 1998 Winter Paralympics. She won six medals, two gold, three silver and one bronze.

In 1986, she was injured in a skiing accident. She publishes her handbike tours on alpenvereinaktiv.

== Career ==
She was selected in the German national Paralympic ski team to participate in three Paralympic Winter Games, in 1992, 1994 and 1998.

At the 1992 Winter Paralympics in Albertville, Pamler won gold in the slalom LW 10/11 race (in a time of 2:03.83). She won two silver medals: in the super-G (in 1: 34.48, behind Sarah Will in 1:27.66, ahead of third Toshiko Gouno in 1:48.89 ); and downhill (with a time of 1:31.09 ), behind Sarah Will in 1:24.08, and ahead of Candace Cable in 1:37.02.

At the 1994 Winter Paralympic Games, she won three medals: gold in 3:12.39 in the giant slalom LWX-XII, silver in the super G LWX-XII (time 1: 28.24), and bronze in the downhill LWX-XII (in a time of 1:36.23, behind Sarah Will 1: 30.46 and Kelley Fox 1:34.55).

Pamler competed at the 1998 Paralympic Winter Games in Nagano, but was disqualified.
