= Juan Carlos Molina (skier) =

Spanish cyclist and skier (born 1974)

Personal information
- Full name: Juan Carlos Molina Merlos
- Nationality: Spanish
- Born: 18 July 1974 (age 51) Granada, Spain

Sport
- Country: Spain
- Sport: Cycling
Medal record
Representing Spain
Paralympic Games
Men's para-alpine skiing
Gold medal – first place	1998 Nagano	Downhill B1,3
Gold medal – first place	1994 Lillehammer	Downhill B1-2
Bronze medal – third place	1994 Lillehammer	Super-G B2
Men's para-cycling
Bronze medal – third place	1992 Barcelona	Road Tandem Open

Juan Carlos Molina Merlos (born 18 July 1974 in Granada) is a cyclist and skier from Spain. He has a disability: He is blind and is a B3 type skier and cyclist.

He competed at the 1996 Summer Paralympics in cycling in the Tandem one bicycle track Pursuit race.

He competed at the 1994 Winter Paralympics in alpine skiing. He finished first in the downhill race. He finished 8 in the Super Giant race. He competed at the 1998 Winter Paralympics. He finished first in the downhill race.
