= Liechtenstein at the 1992 Summer Paralympics =

- IPC code: LIE
- NPC: Liechtensteiner Behinderten Verband

in Barcelona
- Competitors: 3
- Medals: Gold 0 Silver 0 Bronze 0 Total 0

Summer Paralympics appearances (overview)
- 1984; 1988; 1992; 1996–2000; 2004; 2008–2024

Liechtenstein competed at the 1992 Summer Paralympics in Barcelona, Spain. 3 competitors from Liechtenstein won no medals and so did not place in the medal table. Peter Frommelt, Jamod Nemeth and Christoph Sommer were all Table Tennis players who all competed in various Men's Open and Singles events. Frommelt and Nemeth also took part in the Men's Team 9 event finishing third in their group behind the eventual finalists Italy (silver) and Japan (gold).

== See also ==
- Liechtenstein at the Paralympics
- Liechtenstein at the 1992 Summer Olympics
