= Liechtenstein at the 1992 Winter Paralympics =

- IPC code: LIE
- NPC: Liechtensteiner Behinderten Verband

in Tignes-Albertville
- Competitors: 1 in 1 sport
- Medals: Gold 0 Silver 0 Bronze 0 Total 0

Winter Paralympics appearances (overview)
- 1992; 1994; 1998–2018; 2022; 2026

Liechtenstein competed at the 1992 Winter Paralympics in Tignes-Albertville, France. The country's delegation consisted of a single competitor, alpine skier Josef Gmeiner. Gmeiner competed in two events and did not win any medals.

== Alpine skiing ==
Athlete	Event	Time	Rank
Josef Gmeiner	Men's giant slalom B2	3:06.63	4
Josef Gmeiner	Men's Super-G B2	1:44.08	6

== See also ==
- Liechtenstein at the 1992 Winter Olympics
