= Slovakia at the 1994 Winter Paralympics =

- IPC code: SVK
- NPC: Slovak Paralympic Committee
- Website: www.spv.sk

in Lillehammer
- Competitors: 11
- Medals Ranked 19th: Gold 0 Silver 3 Bronze 2 Total 5

Winter Paralympics appearances (overview)
- 1994; 1998; 2002; 2006; 2010; 2014; 2018; 2022; 2026

Other related appearances
- Czechoslovakia (1976–1992)

Slovakia competed at the 1994 Winter Paralympics in Lillehammer, Norway. 11 competitors from Slovakia won 5 medals, 3 silver and 2 bronze, and finished 19th in the medal table.

== Medalists ==
| Medal | Name | Sport | Event |
|---|---|---|---|
| Silver | Jozef Mistina | Alpine skiing | Men's Downhill LW1/3 |
| Silver | Jozef Mistina | Alpine skiing | Men's giant slalom LW1/3 |
| Silver | Jozef Mistina | Alpine skiing | Men's slalom LW1/3 |
| Bronze | Jozef Mistina | Alpine skiing | Men's Super-G LW1/3 |
| Bronze | Marcela Misunova | Alpine skiing | Women's slalom LW6/8 |

== See also ==
- Slovakia at the Paralympics
- Slovakia at the 1994 Winter Olympics
