= Michael Norton (skier) =

Australian Paralympic alpine skier

Michael Norton OAM
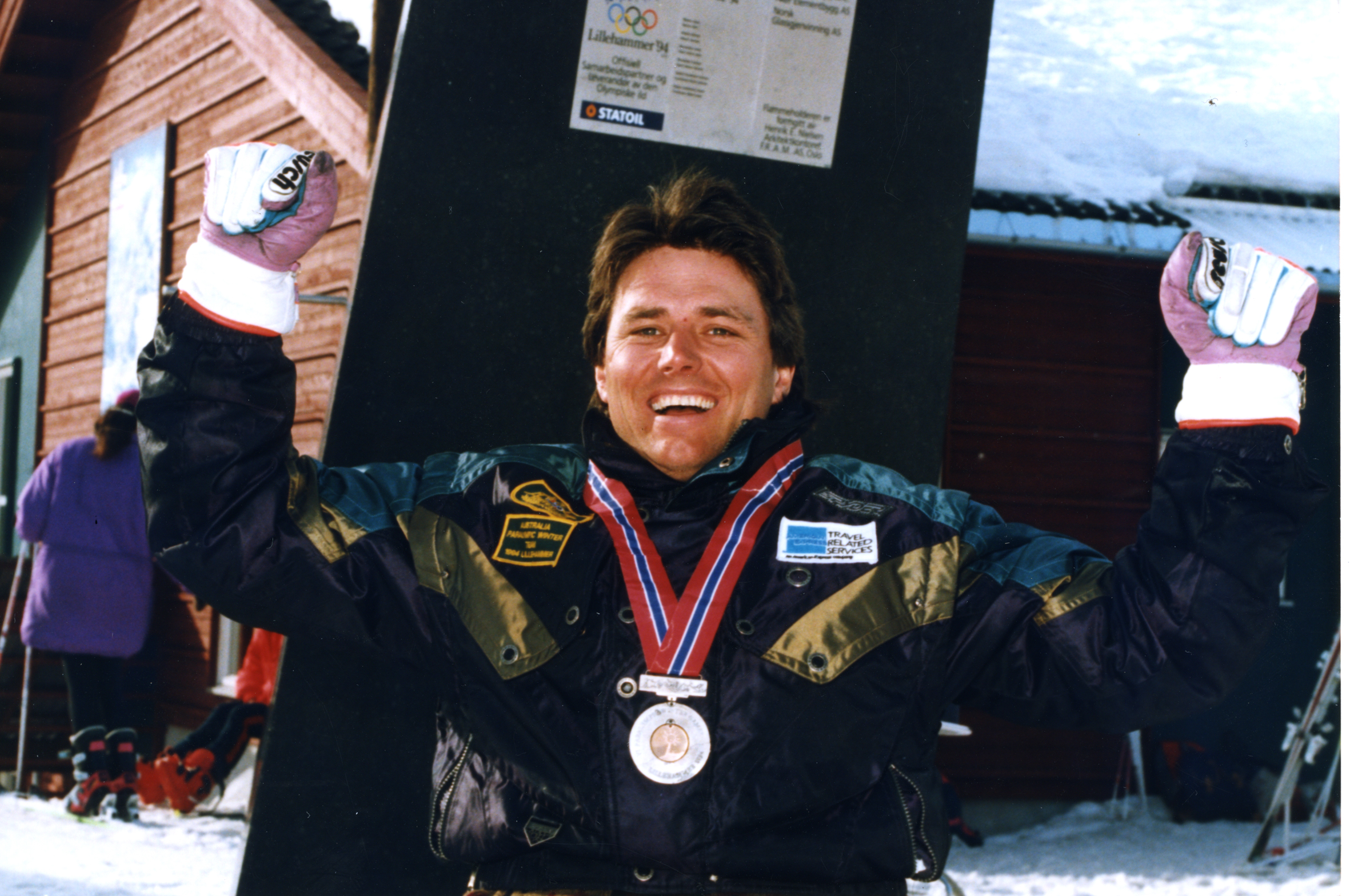
- Norton at the 1994 Lillehammer Winter Games

Personal information
- Full name: Michael Joseph Norton
- Nationality: Australian
- Born: 22 April 1964
- Died: 22 August 1996 (aged 32) Melbourne, Victoria
Medal record
Men's alpine skiing
Winter Paralympic Games
Gold medal – first place	1994 Lillehammer	Slalom LWXI
Gold medal – first place	1994 Lillehammer	Super-G LWXI
Bronze medal – third place	1992 Tignes-Albertville	Slalom LW11

Michael Joseph Norton, OAM (22 April 1964 – 22 August 1996) was an Australian Paralympic alpine skier. As a paraplegic sit skier, he won two gold medals at the 1994 Lillehammer Winter Paralympics.

== Personal ==
Norton grew up on a dairy farm in Leongatha, Victoria. He attended Leongatha High School and left in year four. In February 1984, on the way home from work on his motorbike, he hit a rock and came off the bike near Foster in South Gippsland and became paralysed. At the time of the accident, he was an electrician. Prior to the accident, he was involved in rock climbing and white-water kayaking. After the accident, he completed his high school certificate and started an engineering degree. He ceased the degree, due to having an operation.

Norton established a ski school at Mount Buller for disabled people. His first student was champion Australian wheelchair tennis player Daniela Di Toro. Norton pushed his wheelchair from Melbourne to Mount Buller to raise funds to purchase specialised equipment. He frequently appeared on television to raise the profile of disability sport and to raise funds.

Norton was found dead on 22 August 1996 in his home in the Melbourne suburb of Middle Park. Graeme Johnstone, the Victorian Coroner, found that he had died of a heroin overdose. The coroner also stated there was no evidence that Norton was a long-term user of heroin or other illicit drugs. Family and friends were dissatisfied by the police investigation, which took place eight weeks after his death. The coroner's findings were based on this investigation. Norton was buried in Leongatha.

== Career ==
After the accident, he turned to wheelchair racing and in February 1986 won the Australian championships in Adelaide. However, he found himself alienated in track athletics because he was pushing a wheelchair as opposed to running. In 1987, he was taught to ski by George MacPherson, one of the founders of sit skiing in Australia. He enjoyed skiing as it took him to places he couldn't get to in a wheelchair. In 1988, ski coach Dean Sheppard invited him to Canada for ski racing. This was followed by his appearance at the 1990 IPC Alpine Skiing World Championships in Winter Park, Colorado.

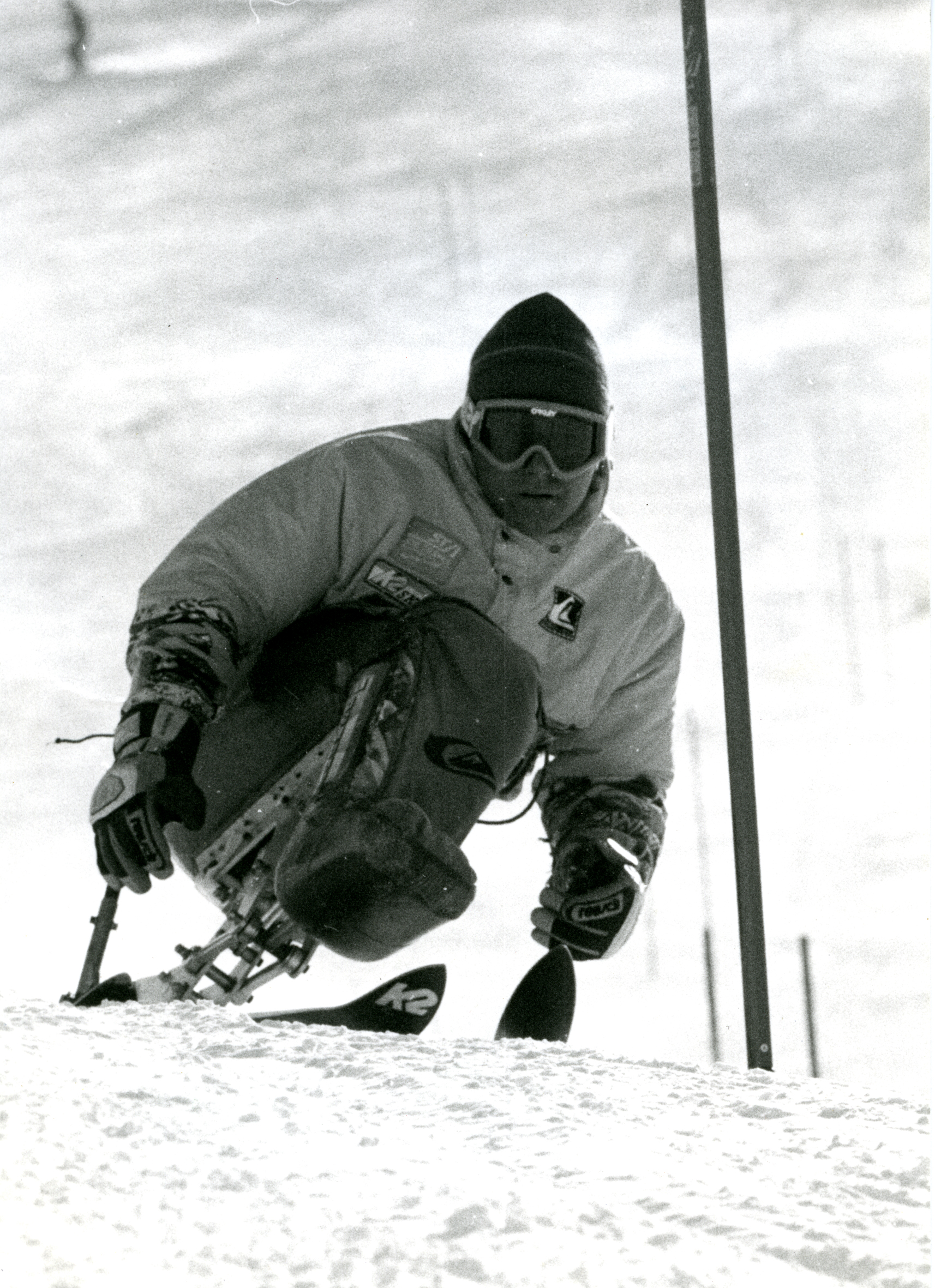
Norton in 1992

At the 1992 Tignes-Albertville Winter Paralympics, he won a bronze medal in the Men's Slalom LW11 event. During training in the days preceding the 1994 Lillehammer Winter Paralympics, he had a crash that resulted in him being unconscious. Despite the crash, he went on to win two gold medals in the Men's Slalom LWXI and Men's Super-G LWXI events, for which he received a Medal of the Order of Australia. Between 1989 and 1994, he won numerous slalom and giant slalom events in Europe and North America.

He was an Australian Institute of Sport Athlete with a Disability scholarship holder in 1995. Also, he was a Victorian Institute of Sport scholarship holder. In 1994, he was awarded the Australian Skier of the Year.

== Advocacy ==
The hardest thing I find about being in a wheelchair is not the handicap, I find it's people's acceptance. Handicapped people have to realize that they just cannot sit in the corner and wait for people to approach them. An that's the kind of message that I want to get across. You have to show people you can get out there and have a go.

He was a strong advocate for people with a disability. He came out strongly against Australian sport administrator Arthur Tunstall who stated that it was embarrassing to have disabled athletes at the 1994 Commonwealth Games. Norton stated "It's obvious he doesn't know how much disabled people wanted to get to the Games. I mean, they're breaking their backs to get there."
