= Liechtenstein at the 1984 Summer Paralympics =

- IPC code: LIE
- NPC: Liechtensteiner Behinderten Verband

in Stoke Mandeville/New York
- Competitors: 1
- Medals: Gold 0 Silver 0 Bronze 0 Total 0

Summer Paralympics appearances (overview)
- 1984; 1988; 1992; 1996–2000; 2004; 2008–2024

Liechtenstein competed at the 1984 Summer Paralympics in Stoke Mandeville, Great Britain and New York City, United States. 1 competitor from Liechtenstein won no medals and so did not place in the medal table. The athlete, Iris Schaelder, competed in the Women's 100m B1 and the Women's Long Jump B1.

== See also ==
- Liechtenstein at the Paralympics
- Liechtenstein at the 1984 Summer Olympics
