= Liechtenstein at the 2022 Winter Paralympics =

- Flag of Liechtenstein
- IPC code: LIE
- NPC: Liechtensteiner Behinderten Verband
- Website: www.lbv.li

in Beijing, China 4 March 2022 – 13 March 2022
- Competitors: 1 (1 woman) in 1 sport
- Flag bearer: Sarah Hundert
- Medals: Gold 0 Silver 0 Bronze 0 Total 0

Winter Paralympics appearances (overview)
- 1992; 1994; 1998–2018; 2022; 2026

Liechtenstein competed at the 2022 Winter Paralympics in Beijing, China which took place between 4–13 March 2022. One alpine skier competed.

== Competitors ==
The following is the list of number of competitors participating at the Games per sport/discipline.

Sport	Men	Women	Total
Alpine skiing	0	1	1
Total	0	1	1

== Alpine skiing ==
One alpine skier represented Liechtenstein.

Athlete	Event	Class	Run 1		Run 2		Total	
Athlete	Event	Class	Time	Rank	Time	Rank	Time	Rank
Sarah Hundert	Women's giant slalom, sitting	LW10-2	DNF		—N/a			
Sarah Hundert	Women's slalom, sitting	LW10-2	DNF		—N/a			

== See also ==
- Liechtenstein at the Paralympics
- Liechtenstein at the 2022 Winter Olympics
