= Liechtenstein at the 2004 Summer Paralympics =

- IPC code: LIE
- NPC: Liechtensteiner Behinderten Verband

in Athens
- Competitors: 1 in 1 sport
- Flag bearer: Peter Frommelt
- Medals Ranked 76th: Gold 0 Silver 0 Bronze 0 Total 0

Summer Paralympics appearances (overview)
- 1984; 1988; 1992; 1996–2000; 2004; 2008–2024

Liechtenstein competed at the 2004 Summer Paralympics in Athens, Greece. The team included 1 athlete, but won no medals. Peter Frommelt, who had previously competed in 1988 and 1992, took part in the table tennis men's singles 8 event, reaching the semi-finals.

== Sports ==
=== Table tennis ===
Athlete	Event	Preliminaries				Quarterfinals	Semifinals	Final / BM	
Athlete	Event	Opposition Result	Opposition Result	Opposition Result	Rank	Opposition Result	Opposition Result	Opposition Result	Rank
Peter Frommelt	Men's singles 8	Vergeylen (BEL); W 3–0	Pichon (FRA); W 3–1	Csonka (HUN); W 3–0	1 Q	Soukup (CZE); W 3–2	Loicq (BEL); L 1-3	Csejtey (SVK); L 0-3	4

== See also ==
- Liechtenstein at the Paralympics
- Liechtenstein at the 2004 Summer Olympics
