= Renate Hjortland =

Norwegian Paralympic skier

Renta Hjortland
Sport
- Country: Norway
- Sport: Alpine skiing
Medal record
sport
Representing Norway
Paralympic Games
Silver medal – second place	1994 Lillehammer	Downhill LW3/4
Silver medal – second place	1994 Lillehammer	Giant slalom LW3/4
Silver medal – second place	1994 Lillehammer	Super-G LW3/4
Bronze medal – third place	1992 Albertville	Super-G LW3,4,9

Renate Hjortland is a Norwegian Paralympic skier. She represented Norway in para-alpine skiing at the 1992 Winter Paralympic Games in France, and 1994 Winter Paralympic Games in Norway. She won a total of four medals, including three silver medals and one bronze medal.

== Career ==
At the 1992 Winter Paralympics, in Tignes Albertville, Hjortland placed 3rd in the super-G LW3,4,9 with a time of 1: 20.93. In 1st place Reinhild Möller who finished the race in 1: 12.41 and in 2nd place Lana Spreeman in 1:19.63.

At the 1994 Winter Paralympics, in Lillehammer, Hjortland won three silver medals: in the giant slalom LW3 / 4 in 2:49.65 (gold for the German athlete Reinhild Möller in 2: 33.06 and bronze for the Canadian Lana Spreeman in 2: 59.73), downhill LW3 / 4 in 1:18.96 (1st place Reinhild Möller with a time of 1: 16.90 and 3rd place Lana Spreeman with 1: 18.99), and super-G LW3 / 4 in 1:16.08 (on the podium Reinhild Möller, in first position with a time of 1:12.05 and Lana Spreeman, third with 1: 19.15).
