= Joanne Duffy =

New Zealand para-alpine skier

Personal information
- Nationality: New Zealand
Medal record
Women's para alpine skiing
Representing New Zealand
Paralympic Games
| Gold medal – first place | 1994 Lillehammer | Downhill |
| Bronze medal – third place | 1994 Lillehammer | Super-G |

Joanne Duffy is a Paralympic medalist from New Zealand who competed in alpine skiing. She competed in the 1994 Winter Paralympics where she won a gold medal in downhill and a bronze in Super-G.
