= Helmut Wolf =

Italian para-alpine skier (1968–2013)

Personal information
- Born: January 5, 1968
- Died: October 9, 2013 (aged 45)

Sport
- Country: Italy
- Sport: Para-alpine skiing
Medal record
Paralympic Games
Silver medal – second place	1994 Lillehammer	Downhill LWX
Silver medal – second place	1994 Lillehammer	Super-G LWX

Helmut Wolf was an Italian para-alpine skier. He represented Italy at the 1992 Winter Paralympics, at the 1994 Winter Paralympics and at the 1998 Winter Paralympics.

In 1994, he won the silver medals in the Men's Downhill LWX and Men's Super-G LWX events.

== See also ==
- List of Paralympic medalists in alpine skiing
