= Athletics at the 1984 Summer Paralympics – Women's 100 metres B1 =

Women's 100 metres B1 at the VII Paralympic Games
- Paralympic Athletics
- Competitors: 16 from 13 nations

Medalists
1st place, gold medalist(s)		Purificacion Santamarta	Spain
2nd place, silver medalist(s)		Lori Bennett	United States
3rd place, bronze medalist(s)		Joke van Rijswijk	Netherlands

The Women's 100 metres B1 was a sprinting event in athletics at the 1984 Summer Paralympics, for blind athletes. For the first time, category B was subdivided, with totally blind athletes running in the B1 event. Sixteen athletes took part, representing thirteen nations. Defending champion Grazyna Kozlowska of Poland was not among them. Spain's Purificacion Santamarta, competing in the event for the first time, won gold and set a new world record in 14.46s.

The International Paralympic Committee's database does not record any heats, merely a "final round" in which all sixteen athletes took part. Of these, fifteen have a recorded time and rank, while Greece's Ekaterini Lakassa has none. The records do not specify whether she was a non-starter, or whether she failed to finish due to injury, or whether she was disqualified.

== Results ==
=== "Final round" ===
Place	Athlete	Time
1	Purificacion Santamarta (ESP)	14.46 (WR)
2	Lori Bennett (USA)	14.79
3	Joke van Rijswijk (NED)	14.84
4	Daniela Dobler (FRG)	14.87
5	Vera Kroes (NED)	14.52
6	Ursula Buschbeck (FRG)	14.90
7	Catherine Welsby (GBR)	15.04
8	Prue-Anne Reynalds (AUS)	15.13
9	Judy Dawson (USA)	15.30
10	Refija Okic (YUG)	15.48
11	Rossella Inverni (ITA)	15.61
12	Iris Schaedler (LIE)	16.90
13	Hong Jiefen (CHN)	16.94
14	Karmila Wagiam (INA)	20.50
15	Abdulla Nagla (EGY)	24.93
-	Ekaterini Lakassa (GRE)	nrc
