= Joke van Rijswijk =

Dutch Paralympic athlete

Sport
- Country: Netherlands
- Sport: Athletics
Medal record
Paralympic Games
Gold medal – first place	1980 Arnhem	High jump A
Gold medal – first place	1984 Stoke Mandeville	Long jump B1
Bronze medal – third place	1984 Stoke Mandeville	High jump B1
Bronze medal – third place	1984 Stoke Mandeville	100 metres B1
Gold medal – first place	1988 Seoul	Long jump B1

Joke van Rijswijk (born 1954) is a Dutch Paralympic athlete. She represented the Netherlands in athletics at the 1980 Summer Paralympics, at the 1984 Summer Paralympics and at the 1988 Summer Paralympics. In total, she won three gold medals and two bronze medals at the Summer Paralympics.

At the 1980 Summer Paralympics, she won the gold medal in the women's high jump A event. At the 1984 Summer Paralympics, she won the gold medal in the women's long jump B1 and bronze medals in the women's high jump B1 and women's 100 metres B1 events. At the 1988 Summer Paralympics in Seoul, South Korea, she won the gold medal in the women's long jump B1 event.

The Joke van Rijswijk Award is named after her. The award is given to people or organisations that have made contributions to sports for people with disabilities.
