= Liechtenstein at the 1988 Summer Paralympics =

- IPC code: LIE
- NPC: Liechtensteiner Behinderten Verband

in Seoul
- Competitors: 2
- Medals: Gold 0 Silver 0 Bronze 0 Total 0

Summer Paralympics appearances (overview)
- 1984; 1988; 1992; 1996–2000; 2004; 2008–2024

Liechtenstein competed at the 1988 Summer Paralympics in Seoul, South Korea. 2 competitors from Liechtenstein won no medals and so did not place in the medal table. Athlete Iris Schaelder competed in the Women's Long Jump B1, having previously competed in the same event in 1984. Table Tennis player Peter Frommelt competed in the Men's Singles TT5 and reached the quarter-final where he lost to the silver medallist Thomas Schmitt (West Germany).

== See also ==
- Liechtenstein at the Paralympics
- Liechtenstein at the 1988 Summer Olympics
