= Roy Boesiger =

Swiss para-alpine skier

Sport
- Country: Switzerland
- Sport: Alpine skiing
Medal record
Paralympic Games
Gold medal – first place	1994 Lillehammer	Giant Slalom B1

Roy Boesiger is a Swiss para-alpine skier. He represented Switzerland at the 1994 Winter Paralympics held in Lillehammer, Norway in alpine skiing.

He won the gold medal in the Men's Giant Slalom B1 event.

He also competed in the Men's Super-G B1 and Men's Slalom B1-2 events but did not win a medal.
