= Liechtenstein at the 1994 Winter Paralympics =

- IPC code: LIE
- NPC: Liechtensteiner Behinderten Verband

in Lillehammer
- Competitors: 1
- Medals Ranked 22nd: Gold 0 Silver 0 Bronze 1 Total 1

Winter Paralympics appearances (overview)
- 1992; 1994; 1998–2018; 2022; 2026

Liechtenstein competed at the 1994 Winter Paralympics in Lillehammer, Norway. One competitor from Liechtenstein won a single bronze medal and finished joint 22nd in the medal table with Belgium, Czech Republic and Estonia.

== See also ==
- Liechtenstein at the Paralympics
- Liechtenstein at the 1994 Winter Olympics
