= Liechtenstein at the Paralympics =

- IPC code: LIE
- NPC: Liechtensteiner Behinderten Verband
- Medals: Gold 0 Silver 0 Bronze 1 Total 1

Summer appearances
- 1984; 1988; 1992; 1996–2000; 2004; 2008–2024

Winter appearances
- 1992; 1994; 1998–2018; 2022

Liechtenstein made its Paralympic Games début at the 1984 Summer Paralympics in Stoke Mandeville and New York City, entering just one athlete (Iris Schaedler) in athletics. The country competed again at the 1988 and 1992 Summer Games, and at the 1992 and 1994 Winter Games. It was then absent from the Paralympics until the 2004 Summer Games in Athens, where it sent just one table tennis player, Peter Frommelt. Liechtenstein was absent from the 2006 and 2010 Winter Games and the 2008 Summer Games.

Liechtenstein has won a single Paralympic medal: a bronze in alpine skiing in 1994.

Liechtenstein is the second smallest sovereign country, and the third smallest National Paralympic Committee (after Macau), ever to have competed at the Paralympic Games - as Tuvalu, Nauru, Monaco and the Vatican City have yet to do so.

As in the Olympics, Liechtenstein is the only participating country to have won a medal only at the Winter Paralympic Games but not in the summer event.

== Medallists ==
Medal	Name	Games	Sport	Event
Bronze	Josef Gmeiner	1994 Lillehammer	Alpine skiing	Men's slalom B1-2

== See also ==
- Liechtenstein at the Olympics
