= Marthana Hjortland =

American dietician and biometrician

Marthana Colleen Hjortland (1929–2025) was an American dietician and biostatistician who worked for many years at the National Institutes of Health.

== Life and career ==
Hjortland was born on July 27, 1929, in Greeley, Colorado, and grew up in Fargo, North Dakota; her name combined the names of her two grandmothers, Martha and Anna. She received a bachelor's degree in 1951 from North Dakota State University, and a master's degree in 1952 from the Ohio State University, in dietetics. She worked for several years as a dietician, and through the University of Michigan published a cookbook for low-gluten food, Low-Gluten Diet with Tested Recipes.

She returned to graduate study in biometrics at the University of Minnesota, where she received a second master's degree in 1969 and completed her Ph.D. in 1972. Her dissertation, The Effects of Heredity and Environment on Nutrient Intake of Adult Monozygotic and Dizygotic Twins, was supervised by Glenn E. Bartsch.

Hjortland worked for 25 years at the National Institutes of Health, where her work included consulting with NASA on spacewalks for the Apollo program, and participating in the Framingham Heart Study. Following her retirement, she moved to Edina, Minnesota. She died on February 6, 2025.

== Recognition ==
Hjortland was named as a Fellow of the American Statistical Association in 1995.
