= Michele Drolet =

American cross-country skier

Michele Drolet was the first American woman to win a medal in cross country skiing; she won the bronze medal at the 1994 Paralympic games in Lillehammer, Norway. She graduated from Mount Holyoke College in 1976.
