= 1994 Winter Paralympics medal table =

1994 Winter Paralympics medals
- Location: Lillehammer, Norway

Highlights
- Most gold medals: Norway (29)
- Most total medals: Norway (64) and Germany (64)
- Medalling NPCs: 25

The 1994 Winter Paralympics medal table is a list of National Paralympic Committees (NPCs) ranked by the number of gold medals won by their athletes during the 1994 Winter Paralympics, held in Lillehammer, Norway, from March 10 to March 19, 1994.

== Medal table ==
The ranking in this table is based on information provided by the International Paralympic Committee (IPC) and is consistent with IPC convention in its published medal tables. By default, the table is ordered by the number of gold medals the athletes from a nation have won (in this context, a "nation" is an entity represented by a National Paralympic Committee). The number of silver medals is taken into consideration next and then the number of bronze medals. If nations are still tied, equal ranking is given and they are listed alphabetically by IPC country code.

To sort this table by nation, total medal count, or any other column, click on the icon next to the column title.

* Host nation (Norway)

Rank	Nation	Gold	Silver	Bronze	Total
1	Norway*	29	22	13	64
2	Germany	25	21	18	64
3	United States	24	12	7	43
4	France	14	6	11	31
5	Russia	10	12	8	30
6	Austria	7	16	12	35
7	Finland	7	6	11	24
8	Sweden	3	3	2	8
9	Australia	3	2	4	9
10	New Zealand	3	0	3	6
11	Switzerland	2	9	5	16
12	Poland	2	3	5	10
13	Spain	1	6	3	10
14	Canada	1	2	5	8
15	Netherlands	1	0	3	4
16	Denmark	1	0	2	3
17	Italy	0	7	6	13
18	Japan	0	3	3	6
19	Slovakia	0	3	2	5
20	Kazakhstan	0	1	0	1
21	Great Britain	0	0	5	5
22	Belgium	0	0	1	1
22	Czech Republic	0	0	1	1
22	Estonia	0	0	1	1
22	Liechtenstein	0	0	1	1
Totals (25 entries)		133	134	132	399

== See also ==
- 1994 Winter Olympics medal table
