= Russia at the Paralympics =

- IPC code: RUS
- NPC: Russian Paralympic Committee
- Website: www.paralymp.ru (in Russian)
- Medals Ranked 17th: Gold 183 Silver 176 Bronze 154 Total 513

Summer appearances
- 1996; 2000; 2004; 2008; 2012; 2016–2024

Winter appearances
- 1994; 1998; 2002; 2006; 2010; 2014; 2018–2022; 2026

Other related appearances
- Soviet Union (1988); Unified Team (1992); Neutral Paralympic Athletes (2018); RPC (2020)

Russia has competed at the Paralympic Games as different teams in its history. The nation competed as part of the Soviet Union at the 1988 Summer and Winter Games, while after the dissolution of the Soviet Union in 1991, Russia competed as part of the Unified Team in 1992. The nation competed for the first time as Russia at the 1994 Winter Paralympics.

== Doping bans ==
On 7 August 2016, the Russian Paralympic Committee was banned from participating in the 2016 Summer Paralympics and the 2018 Winter Paralympics due to the doping scandal in Russia, although in 2018 they were allowed to compete as the Neutral Paralympic Athletes. The decision to ban the entire Russian team contrasts the treatment of the Russian Olympic team during the 2016 Summer Olympics, whose members could compete if they were allowed by their sport's respective governing body.

On 9 December 2019, the World Anti-Doping Agency (WADA) banned Russia from all international sport for four years, after it was found that data provided by the Russian Anti-Doping Agency had been manipulated by Russian authorities with a goal of protecting athletes involved in its state-sponsored doping scheme. Russian athletes would be allowed to participate in the Paralympic under a neutral flag and with a neutral designation.

Russia later appealed against the WADA decision in the CAS. On 17 December 2020, the CAS announced its decision, reducing the suspension to two years and allowing Russian athletes to participate under the flag of the Russian Paralympic Committee, rather than under a neutral flag, and use the Russian national colours. For all victory ceremonies, Pyotr Tchaikovsky's Piano Concerto No. 1 will be used in lieu of the Russian national anthem.

== Impact of the Russo-Ukrainian War ==
After the 2022 Russian invasion of Ukraine, the International Olympic Committee (IOC) condemned Russia's "breach of the Olympic Truce adopted by the UN General Assembly". Following this, the International Paralympic Committee initially announced that the RPC team designation would be banned and that Russian athletes could only compete at the 2022 Winter Paralympics under a fully neutral designation as in 2018. After boycott threats from other nations, the IPC on 3 March 2022 banned Russian athletes from competing entirely. On 16 November 2022, the IPC again suspended the RPC at an extraordinary meeting of the IPC General Assembly.

On 29 September 2023, the IPC decided to continue to partially suspend both the Russian and Belarusian NPCs for two years. Their athletes and their support personnel may participate at the Paralympic Games under individual and neutral capacities. In September 2025, the IPC voted to lift the bans on the Russian and Belarusian National Paralympic Committees, with the countries returning to the Games in 2026.

== Medal tables ==
=== Medals by Summer Games ===
Event	Gold	Silver	Bronze	Total	Rank
1960–1984	did not compete				
(South Korea) Seoul 1988	Part of the Soviet Union (URS)				
(Spain) Barcelona 1992	Part of the Unified Team (EUN)				
(United States) Atlanta 1996	9	7	11	27	16
(Australia) Sydney 2000	12	11	12	35	14
(Greece) Athens 2004	16	8	17	41	11
(China) Beijing 2008	18	23	22	63	8
(United Kingdom) London 2012	36	38	28	102	2
(Brazil) Rio de Janeiro 2016	Disqualified				
(Japan) Tokyo 2020	As the RPC (RPC)				
(France) Paris 2024	As the Neutral Paralympic Athletes (NPA)				
(United States) Los Angeles 2028	Future event				
(Australia) Brisbane 2032	Future event				
Total	91	87	90	268	22

=== Medals by Winter Games ===
Games	Gold	Silver	Bronze	Total	Rank
1976–1984	did not compete				
(Austria) 1988 Innsbruck	Part of the Soviet Union (URS)				
(France) 1992 Tignes-Albertville	Part of the Unified Team (EUN)				
(Norway) 1994 Lillehammer	10	12	8	30	5
(Japan) 1998 Nagano	12	10	9	31	5
(United States) 2002 Salt Lake City	7	9	5	21	5
(Italy) 2006 Turin	13	13	7	33	1
(Canada) 2010 Vancouver	12	16	10	38	2
(Russia) 2014 Sochi	30	28	22	80	1
(South Korea) Pyeongchang 2018	As the Neutral Paralympic Athletes (NPA)				
(China) Beijing 2022	Disqualified				
(Italy) Milan Cortina 2026	8	1	3	12	3
Total	92	89	64	245	5

== See also ==
- Russian Paralympic Committee
- Russia at the Olympics
- Neutral Paralympic Athletes at the 2024 Summer Paralympics
