= United States at the 1994 Winter Paralympics =

- Flag of the United States
- IPC code: USA
- NPC: United States Paralympic Committee
- Website: www.teamusa.org/US-Paralympics

in Lillehammer
- Competitors: 30
- Medals Ranked 3rd: Gold 24 Silver 12 Bronze 7 Total 43

Winter Paralympics appearances (overview)
- 1976; 1980; 1984; 1988; 1992; 1994; 1998; 2002; 2006; 2010; 2014; 2018; 2022; 2026

United States competed at the 1994 Winter Paralympics in Lillehammer, Norway. 30 competitors from United States won 43 medals including 24 gold, 12 silver and 7 bronze and finished 3rd in the medal table.

== See also ==
- United States at the Paralympics
- United States at the 1994 Winter Olympics
