= Sarah Will =

American para-alpine skier (born 1965)

Personal information
- Born: 1965 (age 60–61)

Sport
- Country: United States
- Sport: Alpine skiing

Sarah Will (born 1965) is a paralympic skier who spent 11 years on the U.S. Disabled Ski Team. During this time, she earned a record 13 medals (12 gold, 1 silver) while competing in four Winter Paralympic Games between 1992 and 2002. She was named to the United States Olympic Hall of Fame in July 2009 and is also a member of the U.S. Ski and Snowboard Hall of Fame.

Will serves as an accessibility consultant, public speaker and is an adaptive guest coach throughout the globe. Sarah is an advocate for people with disabilities in the Vail community.

== Life ==
She became paralyzed in 1988 in a skiing accident.

Sarah was one of the first adaptive athletes to compete at the XGames in the first ever Monoskier X cross, where she earned a bronze medal in the women's category. The following year she placed 4th in the open Monoskier X Cross, being the only woman in a field of 16 competitors.

After retiring from competition, Will worked as a commentator for ESPN's XGames. Sarah also served as a commentator for NBC Universal Sports coverage of the Paralympic games in Vancouver, BC and the following games in Sochi, Russia.

In her spare time, Sarah enjoys painting, mainly for charity events.

== See also ==
- Athletes with most gold medals in one event at the Paralympic Games
