= Norway at the 1994 Winter Paralympics =

- IPC code: NOR
- NPC: Norwegian Olympic and Paralympic Committee and Confederation of Sports
- Website: www.idrett.no (in Norwegian)

in Lillehammer
- Competitors: 43
- Medals Ranked 1st: Gold 29 Silver 22 Bronze 13 Total 64

Winter Paralympics appearances (overview)
- 1976; 1980; 1984; 1988; 1992; 1994; 1998; 2002; 2006; 2010; 2014; 2018; 2022; 2026

Norway competed at the 1994 Winter Paralympics in Lillehammer, Norway. The nation's 43 competitors won 64 medals: 29 gold, 22 silver and 13 bronze, finishing 1st in the medal table.

== See also ==
- Norway at the Paralympics
- Norway at the 1994 Winter Olympics
