= Russia at the 1994 Winter Paralympics =

- IPC code: RUS
- NPC: Russian Paralympic Committee
- Website: www.paralymp.ru (in Russian)

in Lillehammer
- Competitors: 27
- Medals Ranked 5th: Gold 10 Silver 12 Bronze 8 Total 30

Winter Paralympics appearances (overview)
- 1994; 1998; 2002; 2006; 2010; 2014; 2018–2022; 2026

Other related appearances
- Soviet Union (1988); Unified Team (1992); Neutral Paralympic Athletes (2018)

Russia competed at the 1994 Winter Paralympics in Lillehammer, Norway. 27 competitors from Russia won 30 medals, 10 gold, 12 silver and 8 bronze, and finished 5th in the medal table.

== See also ==
- Russia at the Paralympics
- Russia at the 1994 Winter Olympics
