= Germany at the 1994 Winter Paralympics =

- IPC code: GER
- NPC: National Paralympic Committee Germany
- Website: www.dbs-npc.de (in German)

in Lillehammer
- Competitors: 43
- Medals Ranked 2nd: Gold 25 Silver 21 Bronze 18 Total 64

Winter Paralympics appearances (overview)
- 1976; 1980; 1984; 1988; 1992; 1994; 1998; 2002; 2006; 2010; 2014; 2018; 2022; 2026

Germany competed at the 1994 Winter Paralympics in Lillehammer, Norway. 43 competitors from Germany won 64 medals including 25 gold, 21 silver, and 18 bronze and finished second in the medal table.

== See also ==
- Germany at the Paralympics
- Germany at the 1994 Winter Olympics
