= Austria at the 1994 Winter Paralympics =

- IPC code: AUT
- NPC: Austrian Paralympic Committee
- Website: www.oepc.at (in German)

in Lillehammer
- Competitors: 38
- Medals Ranked 6th: Gold 7 Silver 16 Bronze 12 Total 35

Winter Paralympics appearances (overview)
- 1976; 1980; 1984; 1988; 1992; 1994; 1998; 2002; 2006; 2010; 2014; 2018; 2022; 2026

Austria competed at the 1994 Winter Paralympics in Lillehammer, Norway. 38 competitors from Austria won 35 medals including 7 gold, 16 silver and 12 bronze and finished 6th in the medal table.

== See also ==
- Austria at the Paralympics
- Austria at the 1994 Winter Olympics
