= 1994 Winter Paralympics =

Multi-parasport event in Lillehammer, Norway

VI Paralympic Winter Games
- Location: Lillehammer, Norway
- Motto: No Limits (Norwegian: Ingen Grenser)
- Nations: 31
- Athletes: 471
- Events: 133 in 5 sports
- Opening: 10 March 1994
- Closing: 19 March 1994
- Opened by: Queen Sonja
- Closed by: IPC President Robert Steadward
- Cauldron: Helge Bjørnstad
- Stadium: Håkons Hall

The 1994 Winter Paralympics (Norwegian: Paralympiske vinterleker 1994; Nynorsk: Paralympiske vinterleikane 1994), the sixth Paralympic Winter Games, were held in Lillehammer, Norway, from 10 to 19 March 1994.The Lillehammer Paralympics were the second time that the Games were held in Norway, after the 1980 Winter Paralympics in Geilo. 471 athletes from 31 countries participated, with Norway claiming the most gold medals ahead of Germany. This was the first Paralympics which the International Paralympic Committee had 100% involvement and responsibility and the first Games with their own logo.

These Games marked the second time the Paralympic Winter Games were held in the same city and venues as the Winter Olympics but despite this, they did not have the same Organizing Committee.However, the two Committees operated jointly in several sectors, something that served as a basis for the collaboration that was carried out for the 1998 Winter Paralympics and 2000 Summer Paralympic Games.Events were held in Alpine skiing, ice sledge speed racing, biathlon and cross-country skiing; the games also introduced ice sledge hockey.The Paralympic Games also shared 5 venues that were used during the Winter Olympics.The only differences were the addition of Kristins Hall as ice sledge hockey venue.This hall which was used as a training site for ice hockey teams during the Olympic Games and the use of the Håkons Hall to the ceremonial venue.

== Olympic Bidding Process ==
Location of Lillehammer in Norway

The idea for an Olympic bid for Norway was born in 1981, when Falun, in neighbouring Sweden was defeated by Calgary in Canada to host the 1988 Winter Olympics. Along with the Norwegian government, the bid was also publicly encouraged and supported by the Swedish government, largely to help stimulate the economy of their inland counties. Lillehammer originally bid for the 1992 Games but came fourth in the voting, with the Games ultimately awarded to Albertville, France. In 1986, at the 91st IOC Session in Lausanne, they announced to separate the Summer and Winter editions (which had been held in the same year since the inception of the Winter Olympics in 1924) after the 1992 Games and have alternated between the 2 editions of the Olympics every two years during the four-year cycle. Lillehammer subsequently launched another bid, now for the 1994 Games, with some drastic modifications of the project, such as a new indoor speed skating venue and an additional ice hall in Lillehammer. Supplementary government guarantees and funds were secured for the new bid.

Three other locations put in bids for the 1994 Games: Anchorage (United States), Östersund (Sweden), and Sofia (Bulgaria). Lillehammer was elected to host the 1994 Winter Games at the 94th IOC Session, held in Seoul on 15 September 1988, two days before the start of the 1988 Summer Olympics. Until 2018, the Lillehammer Games were the last Winter Olympics to be held in a town, rather than centered in a city.

== Paralympic Bid Process ==
More than a year after the success of the Olympic Bid, the Board of the Norwegian Sports Organisation for the Disabled (NIF) realized in October 1989 that there was a possibility that Lillehammer could also host the 6th Paralympic Winter Games, respecting the idea implemented by the IOC in 1984, when Seoul was invited to host the 1988 Summer Paralympics, right after that year's Summer Olympics. Thus, the first movement took place in June 1990 and on 15 July of that same year, the IPC announced that the Norwegian proposal had been accepted without financial support. But, approximately one year after negotiations with the Norwegian Parliament for funding and up to 90 million Norwegian Krone was allocated under the condition that the Lillehammer 1994 Paralympic Winter Games Organizing Committee (LPOC) had to be organized in mirrored way as their Olympic counterpart to obtain the public funding, This forced the entity to be founded as a limited company, with the same status with the Olympic Organising Committee, with 51% owned by the Norwegian Government and 49% owned by the Norwegian Sports Organisation for the Disabled. This allowed those sectors where interests were in common to work in a unified way providing the basis for this form of work to also be used in 1998 Winter Olympics and the 2000 Summer Paralympics. The first meeting of the seven members, four appointed by the Government and three by the Norwegian Sports Organisation for the Disabled, was held on the 21st August 1991.

== Visual identity ==
The Games were represented by an emblem depicting the sun people. This image portrayed the ideas of power, vitality, strength and energy, all of which are characteristics of the athletes who took part.

=== Mascot ===
The characteristics of the emblem were also to be found in the mascot Sondre, the troll. Sondre, who was also an amputee, was the result of a nationwide school competition won by Janne Solem. The mascot was then designed to its final appearance by Tor Lindrupsen. The name for the mascot was chosen in a separate competition and derives from the great skiing pioneer Sondre Nordheim.

== Sports ==
The 1994 Paralympics consisted of 133 events in five disciplines in four sports. Ice sledge hockey made its Paralympic debut as the first winter team sport at these games.

- Alpine skiing
- Sledge hockey
- Ice sledge racing
- Nordic skiing
  - Biathlon
  - Cross-country skiing

== Medal table ==
The top 10 NPCs by number of gold medals are listed below. The host nation (Norway) is highlighted.

| Rank | Nation | Gold | Silver | Bronze | Total |
|---|---|---|---|---|---|
| 1 | Norway* | 29 | 22 | 13 | 64 |
| 2 | Germany | 25 | 21 | 18 | 64 |
| 3 | United States | 24 | 12 | 7 | 43 |
| 4 | France | 14 | 6 | 11 | 31 |
| 5 | Russia | 10 | 12 | 8 | 30 |
| 6 | Austria | 7 | 16 | 12 | 35 |
| 7 | Finland | 6 | 7 | 12 | 25 |
| 8 | Sweden | 3 | 3 | 2 | 8 |
| 9 | Australia | 3 | 2 | 4 | 9 |
| 10 | New Zealand | 3 | 0 | 3 | 6 |
| Totals (10 entries) | | 124 | 101 | 90 | 315 |

== Participants ==
Thirty-one National Paralympic Committees (NPCs) entered athletes at the 1994 Winter Paralympics. The number in parentheses indicates the number of participants from each NPC.

- Australia (6)
- Austria (38)
- Belarus (2)
- Belgium (2)
- Bulgaria (2)
- Canada (31)
- Czech Republic (6)
- Denmark (3)
- Estonia (13)
- Finland (18)
- France (26)
- Germany (43)
- Great Britain (23)
- Iceland (1)
- Italy (23)
- Japan (26)
- Kazakhstan (2)
- South Korea (2)
- Latvia (1)
- Liechtenstein (1)
- Lithuania (2)
- Netherlands (6)
- New Zealand (7)
- Norway (42)
- Poland (15)
- Russia (27)
- Slovakia (11)
- Spain (14)
- Sweden (27)
- Switzerland (19)
- United States (30)

== See also ==
- 1994 Winter Olympics
- 1994 Winter Paralympics medal table

| Preceded by Tignes–Albertville | Winter Paralympics; Lillehammer; VI Paralympic Winter Games (1994) | Succeeded by Nagano |
