= Mats Linder =

Swedish para-alpine skier

Sport
- Country: Sweden
- Sport: Para-alpine skiing

Mats Linder is a Swedish para-alpine skier. He represented Sweden at the 1988 Winter Paralympics, at the 1992 Winter Paralympics and at the 1994 Winter Paralympics. He won the silver medal in the Men's Giant Slalom B1 event and the silver medal in the Men's Downhill B1 event at the 1988 Winter Paralympics. He also won the bronze medal in the Men's Super-G B1 event at the 1992 Winter Paralympics.

== See also ==
- List of Paralympic medalists in alpine skiing
