= Alpine skiing at the 1988 Winter Paralympics – Men's downhill B1 =

Men's downhill B1 at the IV Paralympic Winter Games
- Paralympic Alpine Skiing
- Venue: Innsbruck
- Dates: January 1988
- Competitors: 10 from 7 nations

Medalists
1st place, gold medalist(s)		Franz Griessbacher	Austria
2nd place, silver medalist(s)		Mats Linder	Sweden
3rd place, bronze medalist(s)		Willi Hohm	Austria

The men's downhill B1 was one of the events held in Alpine skiing at the 1988 Winter Paralympics in Innsbruck.

There were 10 competitors in the final.

Austria's Franz Griessbacher set a time of 1:10.43, taking the gold medal, the first of two for him.

Willi Hohm won his only Paralympic medal at this event, having previously competed in several events at the 1976 Winter Paralympics and 1984 Winter Paralympics.

== Results ==
=== Final ===
Rank	Athlete	Time
1st place, gold medalist(s)	Franz Griessbacher (AUT)	1:10.43
2nd place, silver medalist(s)	Mats Linder (SWE)	1:18.17
3rd place, bronze medalist(s)	Willi Hohm (AUT)	1:19.95
4	Willy Mercier (BEL)	2:00.70
5	Giovanni Chinese (ITA)	2:12.01
6	Hans Ole Nielsen (DEN)	2:48.81
	Bruno Kuehne (AUT)	DNF
	Sandy Bruce (GBR)	DSQ
	John Houston (CAN)	DSQ
	John Rigg (GBR)	DSQ
