= Cycling at the Summer Paralympics =

- Governing body: IPC
- Events: 44 (men: 30; women: 12; mixed: 2)

Games
- 1960; 1964; 1968; 1972; 1976; 1980; 1984; 1988; 1992; 1996; 2000; 2004; 2008; 2012; 2016; 2020; 2024
- Medalists; Records

Cycling has been contested at every Summer Paralympic Games since the 1984 Summer Paralympics. From an original program of seven road races, the sport is now contested on both road and track, with handbikes (classified H) and tricycle racing (T) on the road only, while visually impaired tandem class events (B) and standard bicycle racing class event (C) take place in both track and road disciplines. Since 2012 the cycling program at the Paralympics is typically the third largest of any sport in the Games, behind athletics and swimming, and running at approximately 50 separate events.

== Summary of editions ==
Games	Year	Events	Best Nation
1	not held		
2	not held		
3	not held		
4	not held		
5	not held		
6	not held		
7	1984	7	Norway
8	1988	7	South Korea
9	1992	9	Germany
10	1996	23	Australia
11	2000	27	Australia
12	2004	31	Australia
13	2008	44	Great Britain
14	2012	50	Great Britain
15	2016	50	Great Britain
16	2020	51	Great Britain
17	2024	51	France

== Classification ==
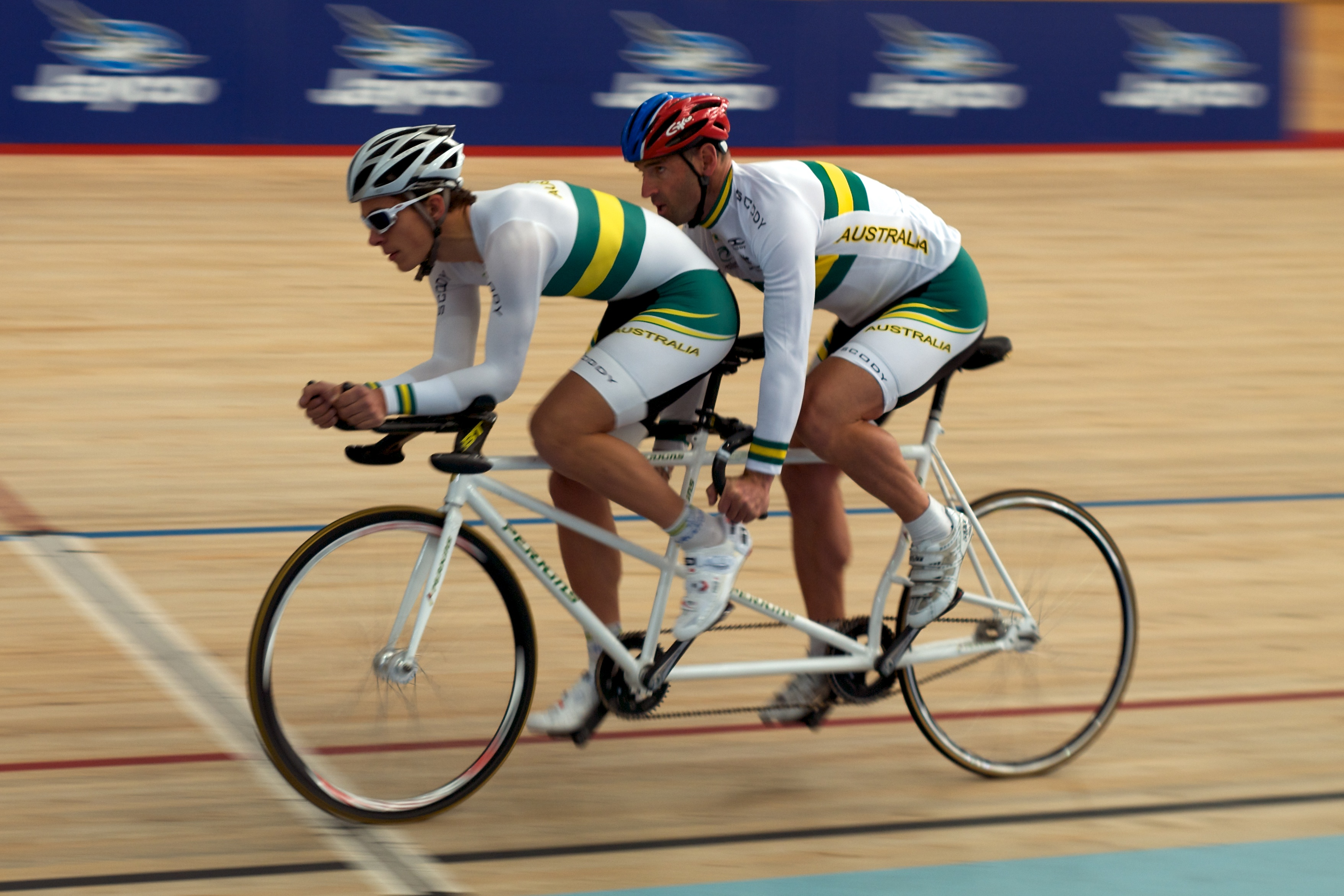
Cyclists with visual impairments are paired with a sighted pilot. Here Scott McPhee pilots to Kieran Modra's stocker.

Cyclists are given a classification depending on the type and extent of their disability. The classification system allows cyclists to compete against others with a similar level of function.

At the 2008 Summer Paralympics and earlier, classes were:

- B&VI 1–3: Cyclists with a visual impairment, using a tandem bicycle
- LC 1–4: Cyclists with a locomotor disability, including those with amputations
- CP 1–4: Cyclists with cerebral palsy, using a tricycle (CP 1–2) or bicycle (CP 3–4)
- HC A, B, and C: Cyclists using a handcycle

At the 2012 Summer Paralympics, a functional para-cycling classification system was used.

- B: Cyclists with a vision impairment, using a tandem bicycle
- T 1–2: Cyclists with cerebral palsy, MS or similar neuro-motor impairment, using a tricycle
- C 1–5: Cyclists with amputations, neuromotor or musculoskeletal impairment, using a bicycle
- H 1–4: Cyclists using a handcycle

As a rule, because of the nature of the machine, tricycle racing and handbike racing does not take place in the velodrome, although both tandem and standard bicycles can be used there. With that restriction, generally every class will have four possible individual events to compete in - a road race and extended road time trial, a track time trial of between 500 and 100 metres and a pursuit between 3000 and 4000 metres. In addition, there are a number of team events; a mixed handbike relays on the road, and a mixed team sprint on the track.

== Factoring ==
In some cycling events, cyclists with different classifications compete against each other for one set of medals. Many (but not all) such events are factored, reducing the times of riders in lower classifications to take their greater impairment into account. Factoring percentages are based on average race times by riders in each classification to give a notional equivalent time for each effort compared to riders in other classifications. Real times, however, are still recorded for world and Paralympic records purposes within each classification.

At the 2012 Summer Paralympics, factored races included the mixed tricycle time trial, Women's C1–3 road time trial, Women's H1–2 road time trial and track C1–3 and C4–5 events.

== Road cycling ==
=== Men's events ===
Current events
Events	1984	1988	1992	1996	2000	2004	2008	2012	2016	2020	Years
Road race	-	-	X	-	-	X	X	X	X	X	6
Time trial	X	X	X	X	-	X	X	X	X	X	9
Past events
Events	1984	1988	1992	1996	2000	2004	2008	2012	2016	2020	Years
Team tandem open, time trial	-	-	X	-	-	-	-	-	-	-	1

=== Women's events ===
Nation	1984	1988	1992	1996	2000	2004	2008	2012	2016	2020	Years
Road race	X	-	-	-	-	X	X	X	X	X	6
Time trial	X	-	X	-	-	X	X	X	X	X	7

=== Mixed events ===
Current events
Events	1984	1988	1992	1996	2000	2004	2008	2012	2016	2020	Years
Team relay	-	-	-	-	-	-	-	X	X	X	3
Past events
Events	1984	1988	1992	1996	2000	2004	2008	2012	2016	2020	Years
Road race	-	-	-	X	X	-	X	X	-	-	4
Time trial	-	-	-	X	X	-	X	X	-	-	4

=== Medal table ===
Rank	Nation	Gold	Silver	Bronze	Total
1	Great Britain (GBR)	26	20	12	58
2	France (FRA)	24	18	20	62
3	United States (USA)	23	29	23	75
4	Netherlands (NED)	23	13	14	50
5	Germany (GER)	22	21	20	63
6	Australia (AUS)	18	19	18	55
7	Spain (ESP)	15	18	24	57
8	Italy (ITA)	13	15	13	41
9	Canada (CAN)	9	9	12	30
10	China (CHN)	8	10	6	24
11	Austria (AUT)	7	11	7	25
12	Ireland (IRL)	7	4	3	14
13	Poland (POL)	5	6	4	15
14	Czech Republic (CZE)	5	3	5	13
15	Switzerland (SUI)	4	9	9	22
16	Belgium (BEL)	4	8	9	21
17	Slovakia (SVK)	4	3	2	9
18	Ukraine (UKR)	4	3	1	8
19	Japan (JPN)	4	2	6	12
20	South Korea (KOR)	3	5	5	13
21	South Africa (RSA)	3	2	3	8
22	Norway (NOR)	3	1	3	7
23	Belarus (BLR)	3	1	0	4
24	Denmark (DEN)	2	0	1	3
25	RPC (RPC)	2	0	0	2
26	New Zealand (NZL)	0	2	5	7
27	Sweden (SWE)	0	2	3	5
28	Czechoslovakia (TCH)	0	2	0	2
28	Finland (FIN)	0	2	0	2
28	Romania (ROU)	0	2	0	2
31	Portugal (POR)	0	1	2	3
31	West Germany (FRG)	0	1	2	3
33	Brazil (BRA)	0	1	1	2
34	Israel (ISR)	0	1	0	1
35	Colombia (COL)	0	0	6	6
36	Lebanon (LIB)	0	0	2	2
37	Argentina (ARG)	0	0	1	1
37	Russia (RUS)	0	0	1	1
Totals (38 entries)		241	244	243	728

== Track cycling ==
=== Men's events ===
Current events
Event	1996	2000	2004	2008	2012	2016	2020	Years
Bicycle, individual pursuit	-	-	X	X	X	X	X	5
Bicycle, time trial	-	-	X	X	X	X	X	5
Tandem, individual pursuit	X	X	X	X	X	X	X	7
Tandem, time trial	X	X	X	X	X	X	X	7
Past events
Events	1996	2000	2004	2008	2012	2016	2020	Years
Bicycle, team sprint	-	-	X	X	-	-	-	2
Tandem, sprint	X	X	X	X	-	-	-	4

=== Women's events ===
Current events
Events	1996	2000	2004	2008	2012	2016	2020	Years
Bicycle, individual pursuit	-	-	-	-	X	X	X	3
Bicycle, 500m time trial	-	-	-	X	X	X	X	4
Tandem, individual pursuit	X	X	X	X	X	X	X	7
Tandem, 1 km time trial	X	X	X	X	X	X	X	7
Past events
Events	1996	2000	2004	2008	2012	2016	2020	Years
Bicycle, 1 km time trial	-	-	X	-	-	X	-	2
Tandem, sprint	-	-	X	-	-	-	-	1

=== Mixed events ===
Current events
Events	1996	2000	2004	2008	2012	2016	2020	Years
Team, sprint	-	X	-	-	X	X	X	4
Past events
Events	1996	2000	2004	2008	2012	2016	2020	Years
Omnium	X	-	-	-	-	-	-	1
Tandem open, individual pursuit	X	X	-	-	-	-	-	2
Tandem open, sprint	X	X	-	-	X	X	-	4
Tandem open, time trial	X	X	-	-	-	-	-	2

=== Medal table ===
Rank	Nation	Gold	Silver	Bronze	Total
1	Great Britain (GBR)	34	18	9	61
2	Australia (AUS)	27	20	19	66
3	China (CHN)	10	9	12	31
4	United States (USA)	7	13	12	32
5	Netherlands (NED)	6	6	5	17
6	Italy (ITA)	5	2	6	13
7	Spain (ESP)	4	7	9	20
8	France (FRA)	4	5	7	16
9	Czech Republic (CZE)	3	4	5	12
10	Slovakia (SVK)	3	2	2	7
11	Germany (GER)	2	8	7	17
12	Japan (JPN)	2	5	0	7
13	New Zealand (NZL)	2	2	3	7
14	Austria (AUT)	1	3	1	5
15	Romania (ROU)	1	1	0	2
16	Switzerland (SUI)	1	0	1	2
16	Ukraine (UKR)	1	0	1	2
18	Belarus (BLR)	1	0	0	1
18	RPC (RPC)	1	0	0	1
20	Canada (CAN)	0	5	5	10
21	Ireland (IRL)	0	2	1	3
22	Norway (NOR)	0	1	2	3
23	Poland (POL)	0	1	1	2
24	South Korea (KOR)	0	1	0	1
25	Colombia (COL)	0	0	3	3
26	Belgium (BEL)	0	0	2	2
27	Argentina (ARG)	0	0	1	1
27	South Africa (RSA)	0	0	1	1
Totals (28 entries)		115	115	115	345

== Overall medal table ==
Updated to 2024 Summer Paralympics. Countries in italics are former countries who participated in the Paralympics.

=== Medal table ===
Rank	Nation	Gold	Silver	Bronze	Total
1	Great Britain (GBR)	59	38	21	118
2	Australia (AUS)	45	39	37	121
3	United States (USA)	30	40	35	105
4	Netherlands (NED)	29	19	19	67
5	France (FRA)	28	23	28	79
6	Germany (GER)	24	29	26	79
7	China (CHN)	18	19	18	55
8	Italy (ITA)	17	17	24	58
9	Spain (ESP)	15	18	24	57
10	Canada (CAN)	9	13	17	39
11	Austria (AUT)	8	14	9	31
12	Czech Republic (CZE)	8	7	10	25
13	Ireland (IRL)	7	6	4	17
14	Slovakia (SVK)	7	5	4	16
15	Japan (JPN)	6	7	6	19
16	Switzerland (SUI)	5	9	9	23
17	Poland (POL)	5	7	4	16
18	Ukraine (UKR)	5	3	2	10
19	Belgium (BEL)	4	9	10	23
20	Belarus (BLR)	4	1	0	5
21	South Korea (KOR)	3	6	5	14
22	Norway (NOR)	3	2	5	10
23	South Africa (RSA)	3	2	3	8
24	RPC (RPC)	3	0	0	3
25	New Zealand (NZL)	2	4	8	14
26	Denmark (DEN)	2	0	1	3
27	Romania (ROU)	1	3	0	4
28	Sweden (SWE)	0	2	3	5
29	Czechoslovakia (TCH)	0	2	0	2
29	Finland (FIN)	0	2	0	2
31	Portugal (POR)	0	1	2	3
31	West Germany (FRG)	0	1	2	3
33	Brazil (BRA)	0	1	1	2
34	Israel (ISR)	0	1	0	1
35	Colombia (COL)	0	0	7	7
36	Argentina (ARG)	0	0	2	2
36	Lebanon (LIB)	0	0	2	2
38	Russia (RUS)	0	0	1	1
Totals (38 entries)		350	350	349	1,049

== Nations ==
Nation	60	64	68	72	76	80	84	88	92	96	00	04	08	12	16	20	Total
Afghanistan (AFG)										2		2					2
Albania (ALB)														1			1
Argentina (ARG)												1	3	3	5		4
Australia (AUS)								1	8	14	22	19	17	15	15		8
Austria (AUT)								1	4	7	9	7	11	7	4		8
Barbados (BAR)											1	1					2
Belarus (BLR)										2	4	6	6	2			5
Belgium (BEL)								3	7	5	2	1	3	4	8		8
Bosnia and Herzegovina (BIH)												1					1
Brazil (BRA)									1	1	2	1	2	2	5		7
Burkina Faso (BUR)									2	2			1	2			4
Canada (CAN)							4	3	15	7	10	12	15	15	14		9
China (CHN)												6	8	8	11		4
Colombia (COL)												1	4	3	6		4
Costa Rica (CRC)														1	1		2
Croatia (CRO)													1	2			2
Cuba (CUB)														1	1		2
Czech Republic (CZE)										3	6	8	8	8	8		6
Czechoslovakia (TCH)								1	3								2
Denmark (DEN)												1	3	2	2		4
Dominican Republic (DOM)														1	1		2
Estonia (EST)															1		1
Finland (FIN)							1					2	2	2	3		5
France (FRA)							1	6	16	17	18	9	9	14	5		9
Germany (GER)									9	13	13	17	17	16	15		7
Ghana (GHA)														1	1		2
Great Britain (GBR)							1	1	7	8	8	8	12	19	20		9
Greece (GRE)												4	2	5	6		4
Haiti (HAI)														1			1
Hungary (HUN)															2		1
Iran (IRI)												1		1	1		3
Ireland (IRL)									1			3	6	10	10		5
Israel (ISR)												1	1	3	1		4
Italy (ITA)									8	12	9	7	9	13	13		7
Japan (JPN)										2	7	6	5	4	5		6
Lebanon (LBN)													1	1			2
Luxembourg (LUX)													1		2		2
Malaysia (MAS)														2	4		2
Mexico (MEX)													1				1
Netherlands (NED)							3		4	7	3	5	6	11	18		8
New Zealand (NZL)												2	5	6	8		4
Norway (NOR)							3	2	4	4	6	7	1	2	1		9
Pakistan (PAK)										1							1
Peru (PER)															1		1
Poland (POL)												3	6	6	12		4
Portugal (POR)							3				1	1	1		2		5
Romania (ROU)												1	3	2	2		4
Russia (RUS)														2			1
Serbia (SRB)														2			1
Singapore (SGP)										2	2						2
Slovakia (SVK)										2	4	4	4	6	5		6
Slovenia (SLO)												1	1	1	1		4
South Africa (RSA)												4	7	6	6		4
South Korea (KOR)								10	5	3	4	2	2	2	3		8
Spain (ESP)									17	26	23	14	16	16	12		7
Sweden (SWE)												1		1	4		3
Switzerland (SUI)									6	6	8	8	5	8	7		7
Ukraine (UKR)														1	1		2
Unified Team (EUN)									2								1
United States (USA)							3	11	30	35	35	18	13	17	24		9
Venezuela (VEN)											1	1	2	2	2		5
West Germany (FRG)							3	1									2
Nations							8	11	19	23	25	39	39	48	45		
Competitors							22	40	149	181	202	196	220	223	235		
Year	60	64	68	72	76	80	84	88	92	96	00	04	08	12	16	20	

== See also ==
- Cycling at the Summer Olympics
- Cycle sport
- Para-cycling
- Para-cycling classification
- UCI Para-cycling Road World Championships
- UCI Para-cycling Track World Championships
