= Sweden at the 2010 Winter Paralympics =

- IPC code: SWE
- NPC: Swedish Parasports Federation

in Vancouver
- Competitors: 24 in 5 sports
- Flag bearer: Jens Kask
- Medals Ranked 19th: Gold 0 Silver 0 Bronze 2 Total 2

Winter Paralympics appearances (overview)
- 1976; 1980; 1984; 1988; 1992; 1994; 1998; 2002; 2006; 2010; 2014; 2018; 2022; 2026

Sweden sent 24 competitors to compete in all five disciplines at the 2010 Winter Paralympics in Vancouver, British Columbia, Canada.

== Medalists ==
The following Swedish athletes won medals at the games:

Medal	Name	Sport	Event
Bronze	Jalle Jungnell (skip); Anette Wilhelm; Glenn Ikonen; Patrik Burman; Patrik Kallin (alternate)	Wheelchair curling	Mixed
Bronze	Zebastian Modin	Cross-country skiing	Sprint visually impaired

== Alpine skiing ==
Athlete	Event	Final				
Athlete	Event	Run 1	Run 2	Run 3	Total Time	Rank
Linnea Ottosson Eide	Giant slalom sitting	1:40.39	Did Not Finish			
Linnea Ottosson Eide	Slalom sitting	1:35.40	1:21.35		2:56.75	9
Petter Ledin	Super-G sitting				Did Not Finish	
Petter Ledin	Giant slalom sitting	Did Not Finish				
Simon Jacobsen	Giant slalom sitting	Did Not Finish				
Simon Jacobsen	Slalom sitting	1:09.56	1:16.17		2:25.73	30

== Biathlon ==
Athlete	Events	Final				
Athlete	Events	Real time	Missed shots	Factor %	Finish time	Rank
Håkan Axelsson	Men's 2 × 3km pursuit visually impaired	13:56.81	3+4	98	16:00.07	14
Zebastian Modin	Men's 2 × 3km pursuit visually impaired	Did Not Start				

== Cross-country skiing ==
Athlete	Event	Final		
Athlete	Event	Time	Calculated Time	Rank
Håkan Axelsson	10 km visually impaired	33:53.2	33:12.5	12
Håkan Axelsson	20 km visually impaired	Did Not Finish		
Zebastian Modin	10 km visually impaired	34:53.7	30:21.5	9
Zebastian Modin	20 km visually impaired	1:08:50.4	58:30.8	11
Stina Sellin	5 km standing	19:28.1	17:54.7	4
Stina Sellin	15 km standing	1:00:51.3	59:01.8	10

Sprint

Athlete	Event	Qualifying			Semifinal		Final	
Athlete	Event	Total	Calculated	Rank	Time	Rank	Time	Rank
Zebastian Modin	Sprint visually impaired	3:49.33	3:19.52	2 Q	3:50.0	1 Q	3:50.2	Bronze medal
Håkan Axelsson	Sprint visually impaired	3:44.89	3:40.39	16	Did Not Advance			16
Stina Sellin	Sprint standing	4:49.85	4:25.27	7 Q	4:56.9	4	Did Not Advance	7

== Ice sledge hockey ==
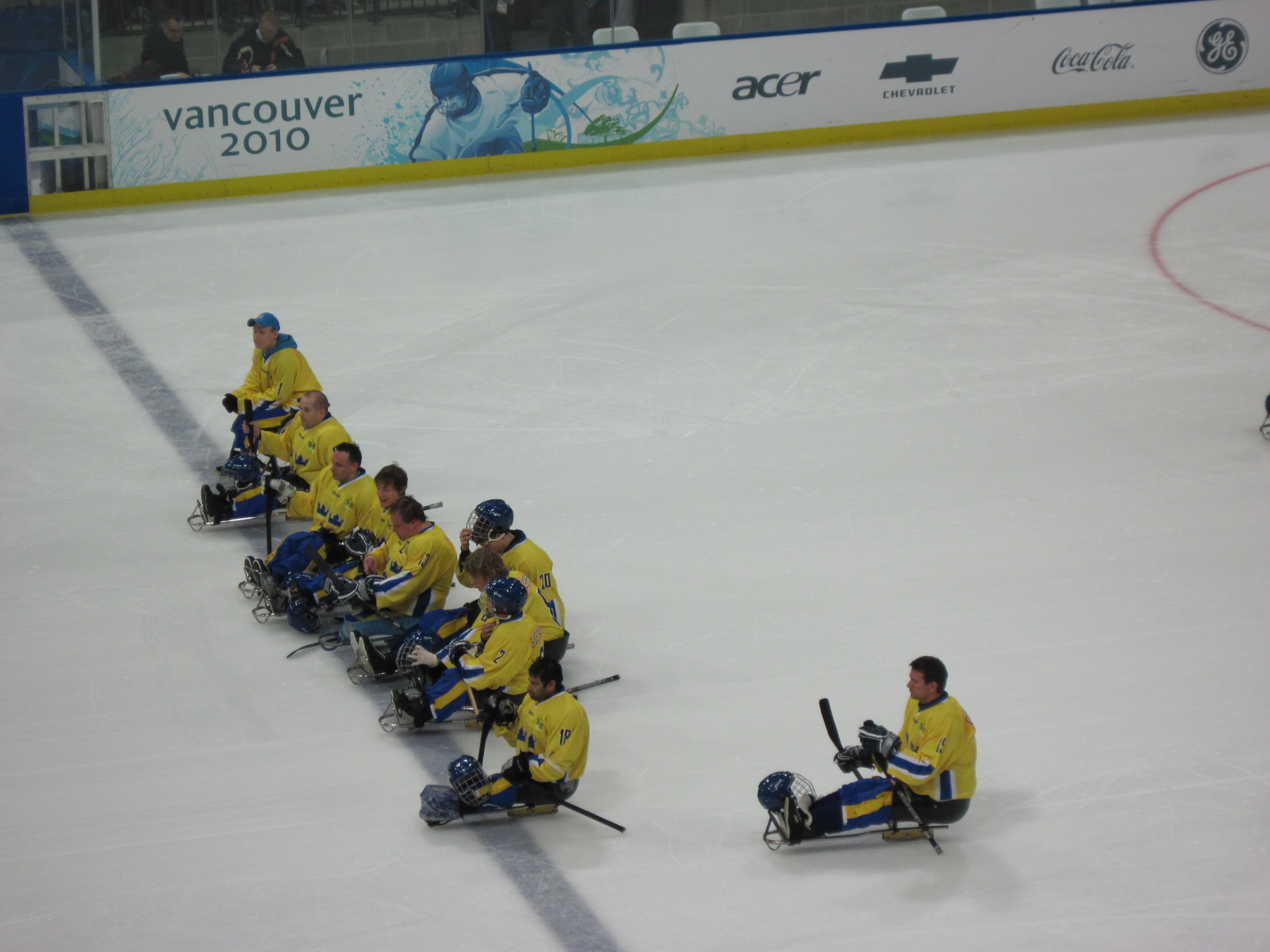
Sweden's Ice Sledge Hockey team, at the UBC Thunderbird Winter Sports Centre, Vancouver.

The Swedish ice sledge hockey team qualified by winning the qualifier tournament.

Squad list	Group stage (Pool B)		Semifinal	Final	
Squad list	Opposition Result	Rank	Opposition Result	Opposition Result	Rank
From: Aron Andersson; Magnus Carlsson; Dedjo Engmark; Marcus Holm; Niklas Ingvarsson; Jens Kask; Per Kasperi; Albin Lindell; Rasmus Lundgren; Ulf Nilsson; Niklas Rakos; Dan Svensson; Anders Wistrand	Norway; L 2–1	5	South Korea; L 1–2	Italy; L 4–0	8
From: Aron Andersson; Magnus Carlsson; Dedjo Engmark; Marcus Holm; Niklas Ingvarsson; Jens Kask; Per Kasperi; Albin Lindell; Rasmus Lundgren; Ulf Nilsson; Niklas Rakos; Dan Svensson; Anders Wistrand	Canada; L 10–1	5	South Korea; L 1–2	Italy; L 4–0	8
From: Aron Andersson; Magnus Carlsson; Dedjo Engmark; Marcus Holm; Niklas Ingvarsson; Jens Kask; Per Kasperi; Albin Lindell; Rasmus Lundgren; Ulf Nilsson; Niklas Rakos; Dan Svensson; Anders Wistrand	Italy; W 0–1	5	South Korea; L 1–2	Italy; L 4–0	8

== Wheelchair curling ==
The Swedish team qualified for the 2010 Paralympic wheelchair curling tournament based on their performance in the 2007, 2008, and 2009 World Wheelchair Curling Championships.

Squad list	Round robin		Tie-breaker	Semifinal	Final	Rank
Squad list	Opposition Result	Rank	Tie-breaker	Semifinal	Final	Rank
Jalle Jungnell (skip); Anette Wilhelm; Glenn Ikonen; Patrik Burman; Patrik Kallin (alternate); Coach: Tomas Nordin	Switzerland; L 6–7	4	Italy; W 5–6	Canada; L 5–10	United States; W 7–5	Bronze medal
Jalle Jungnell (skip); Anette Wilhelm; Glenn Ikonen; Patrik Burman; Patrik Kallin (alternate); Coach: Tomas Nordin	South Korea; L 4–8	4	Italy; W 5–6	Canada; L 5–10	United States; W 7–5	Bronze medal
Jalle Jungnell (skip); Anette Wilhelm; Glenn Ikonen; Patrik Burman; Patrik Kallin (alternate); Coach: Tomas Nordin	Italy; L 1–9	4	Italy; W 5–6	Canada; L 5–10	United States; W 7–5	Bronze medal
Jalle Jungnell (skip); Anette Wilhelm; Glenn Ikonen; Patrik Burman; Patrik Kallin (alternate); Coach: Tomas Nordin	Norway; W 4–6	4	Italy; W 5–6	Canada; L 5–10	United States; W 7–5	Bronze medal
Jalle Jungnell (skip); Anette Wilhelm; Glenn Ikonen; Patrik Burman; Patrik Kallin (alternate); Coach: Tomas Nordin	Canada; W 8–4	4	Italy; W 5–6	Canada; L 5–10	United States; W 7–5	Bronze medal
Jalle Jungnell (skip); Anette Wilhelm; Glenn Ikonen; Patrik Burman; Patrik Kallin (alternate); Coach: Tomas Nordin	United States; W 4–6	4	Italy; W 5–6	Canada; L 5–10	United States; W 7–5	Bronze medal
Jalle Jungnell (skip); Anette Wilhelm; Glenn Ikonen; Patrik Burman; Patrik Kallin (alternate); Coach: Tomas Nordin	Great Britain; W 7–6	4	Italy; W 5–6	Canada; L 5–10	United States; W 7–5	Bronze medal
Jalle Jungnell (skip); Anette Wilhelm; Glenn Ikonen; Patrik Burman; Patrik Kallin (alternate); Coach: Tomas Nordin	Japan; L 8–7	4	Italy; W 5–6	Canada; L 5–10	United States; W 7–5	Bronze medal
Jalle Jungnell (skip); Anette Wilhelm; Glenn Ikonen; Patrik Burman; Patrik Kallin (alternate); Coach: Tomas Nordin	Germany; W 3–10	4	Italy; W 5–6	Canada; L 5–10	United States; W 7–5	Bronze medal

== See also ==
- Sweden at the 2010 Winter Olympics
