= Sweden at the 1984 Winter Paralympics =

- IPC code: SWE
- NPC: Swedish Parasports Federation

in Innsbruck
- Flag bearer: Ola Rylander
- Medals Ranked 6th: Gold 7 Silver 2 Bronze 5 Total 14

Winter Paralympics appearances (overview)
- 1976; 1980; 1984; 1988; 1992; 1994; 1998; 2002; 2006; 2010; 2014; 2018; 2022; 2026

Sweden competed at the 1984 Winter Paralympics in Innsbruck, Austria. They won seven gold medals, two silver medals and five bronze medals and finished 6th in the medal table.

== See also ==
- Sweden at the Paralympics
- Sweden at the 1984 Winter Olympics
