= Cycling at the 1992 Summer Paralympics =

Cycling at the IX Paralympic Games
- Paralympic Cycling

Paralympic symbol (1988-1994)

Cycling at the 1992 Summer Paralympics consisted of nine events. All were road cycling events; no track cycling was held until 1996 in Atlanta.

== Medal summary ==
Event	Gold	Silver	Bronze
Men's 1500 m time trial tricycle CP Div 2	Guy Culot; Belgium	Corey Huntley; United States	Geert Couchez; Belgium
Men's 5 km time trial bicycle CP Div 3	Thomas Beer; Germany	Gary Longhi; Canada	Jong Kil Kim; South Korea
Men's road race LC1	Francisco Trujillo; France	Wolfgang Eibeck; Austria	Jose Antonio Garcia; Spain
Men's road race LC2	Patrice Bonneau; Canada	Lubomir Simovec; Czechoslovakia	Pascal Montastier; France
Men's road race LC3	Norbert Zettler; Austria	PierAngelo Beltrami; United States	Miguel Perez; Spain
Men's tandem open	Germany (GER); Hans-Jorg Furrer; Frank Hoefle	Netherlands (NED); Catharinus Beumer; Jan Mulder	Spain (ESP); Jose Santiago; Juan Carlos Molina
Men's team time trial tandem open	Netherlands (NED); Ad Verhoeven; Alphonsus Stelleman; Catharinus Beumer; Jan Mulder	Switzerland (SUI); Adrian Mosimann; Hans Guggisberg; Toni de Biasi; Peter Kaser	Germany (GER); Friedhelm Welz; Manfred Fischer; Hans-Jorg Furrer; Frank Hoefle
Mixed tandem open	Spain (ESP); Ignacio Rodriguez; Belen Perez	United States (USA); Liz Heller; Greg Evangelatos	Italy (ITA); Maria Erlacher; Klaus Fruet
Women's 5 km time trial bicycle CP Div 3	Erika Benjamin; United States	Monique Glasgow; Canada	Agnes Meszaros; Canada

=== Medal table ===
Rank	Nation	Gold	Silver	Bronze	Total
1	Germany (GER)	2	0	1	3
2	United States (USA)	1	3	0	4
3	Canada (CAN)	1	2	1	4
4	Austria (AUT)	1	1	0	2
4	Netherlands (NED)	1	1	0	2
6	Spain (ESP)	1	0	3	4
7	Belgium (BEL)	1	0	1	2
7	France (FRA)	1	0	1	2
9	Czechoslovakia (TCH)	0	1	0	1
9	Switzerland (SUI)	0	1	0	1
11	Italy (ITA)	0	0	1	1
11	South Korea (KOR)	0	0	1	1
Totals (12 entries)		9	9	9	27
