= Ursula Egner =

German paracyclist

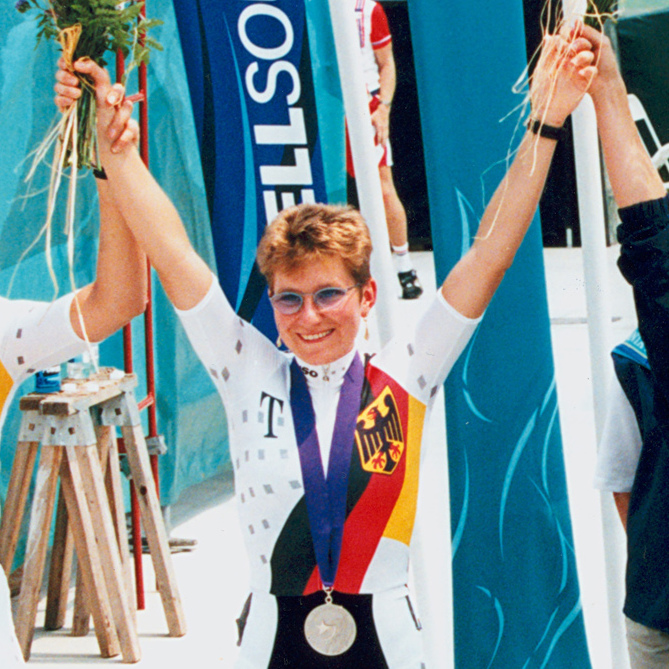
- Egner in 1996
- Born: 1966 (age 59–60)

Ursula Egner (born 1966) is a German vision impaired paracyclist. She and her pilot, Elfriede Ranz won silver medals at the 1996 Atlanta Paralympic Games in the 1 km Women's time trial tandem open.

== Life ==
Egner was born in 1966. She is a visually impaired cyclist who competes on a tandem. She won three gold and one silver medal at the European Cycling Championships in 1995 in Altenstadt. She and Elfriede Ranz won silver medals at the 1996 Atlanta Paralympic Games in the 1 km tandem event. The gold medals went to the Australian team of Sandra Smith and Terri Poole. For this they won silver laural awards from the German federal president.
