= Sweden at the 2006 Winter Paralympics =

- IPC code: SWE
- NPC: Swedish Parasports Federation

in Turin
- Competitors: 19 in 4 sports
- Flag bearer: Rolf Johansson
- Medals Ranked 19th: Gold 0 Silver 0 Bronze 1 Total 1

Winter Paralympics appearances (overview)
- 1976; 1980; 1984; 1988; 1992; 1994; 1998; 2002; 2006; 2010; 2014; 2018; 2022; 2026

Sweden competed at the 2006 Winter Paralympics in Turin, Italy.

Sweden entered 19 athletes in the following sports:

- Alpine skiing: 1 male
- Ice sledge hockey: 12 males
- Nordic skiing: 1 female
- Wheelchair curling: 4 males, 1 female

== Medalists ==
| Medal | Name | Sport | Event | Date |
|---|---|---|---|---|
| Bronze | Jalle Jungnell; Glenn Ikonen; Rolf Johansson; Anette Wilhelm; Bernt Sjöberg | Wheelchair curling | Mixed team | 17 March |

== See also ==
- 2006 Winter Paralympics
- Sweden at the 2006 Winter Olympics
