= Cycling at the 1996 Summer Paralympics =

Cycling at the X Paralympic Games
- Paralympic Cycling
- Competitors: 181 from 23 nations

Paralympic symbol (1994-2004)

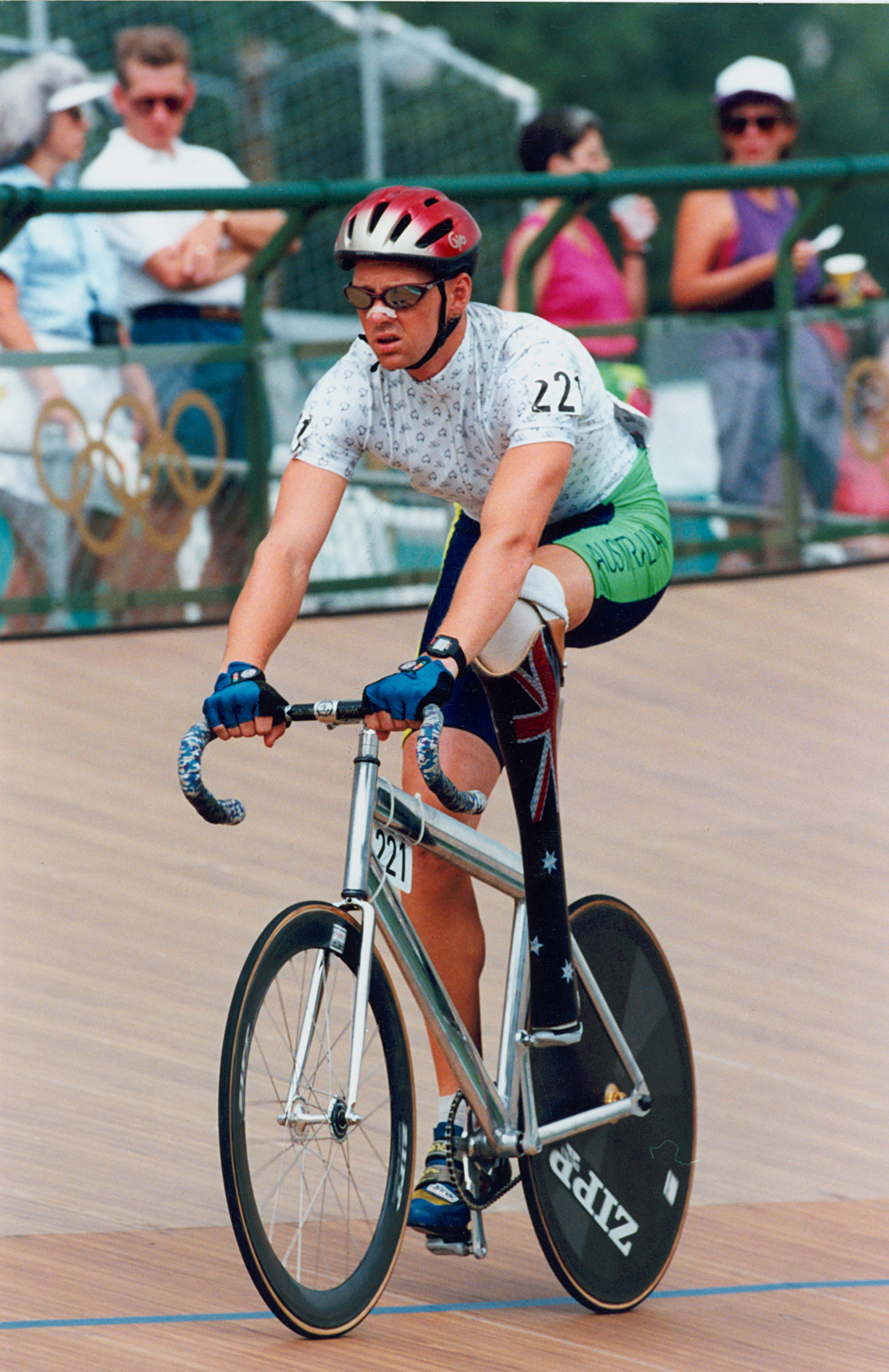
Silver medalist Paul Lake in the LC1 omnium event

Cycling at the 1996 Summer Paralympics consisted of 23 events in two disciplines, road cycling and track cycling.

== Medal table ==
Rank	Nation	Gold	Silver	Bronze	Total
1	Australia (AUS)	5	5	0	10
2	France (FRA)	5	1	3	9
3	Italy (ITA)	3	2	1	6
4	Canada (CAN)	3	1	3	7
5	United States (USA)	2	5	6	13
6	Spain (ESP)	1	1	3	5
7	Belgium (BEL)	1	1	0	2
8	Austria (AUT)	1	0	2	3
8	Japan (JPN)	1	0	2	3
10	Netherlands (NED)	1	0	0	1
11	Germany (GER)	0	3	1	4
12	Czech Republic (CZE)	0	1	0	1
12	Slovakia (SVK)	0	1	0	1
12	South Korea (KOR)	0	1	0	1
12	Switzerland (SUI)	0	1	0	1
16	Norway (NOR)	0	0	2	2
Totals (16 entries)		23	23	23	69

=== Participating nations ===
- Afghanistan (2)
- Australia (14)
- Austria (7)
- Belarus (2)
- Belgium (5)
- Brazil (1)
- Burkina Faso (2)
- Canada (7)
- Czech Republic (3)
- France (17)
- Germany (13)
- Great Britain (8)
- Italy (12)
- Japan (2)
- Netherlands (7)
- Norway (4)
- Pakistan (1)
- Singapore (2)
- Slovakia (2)
- South Korea (3)
- Spain (26)
- Switzerland (6)
- United States (35)

== Medal summary ==
=== Road cycling ===
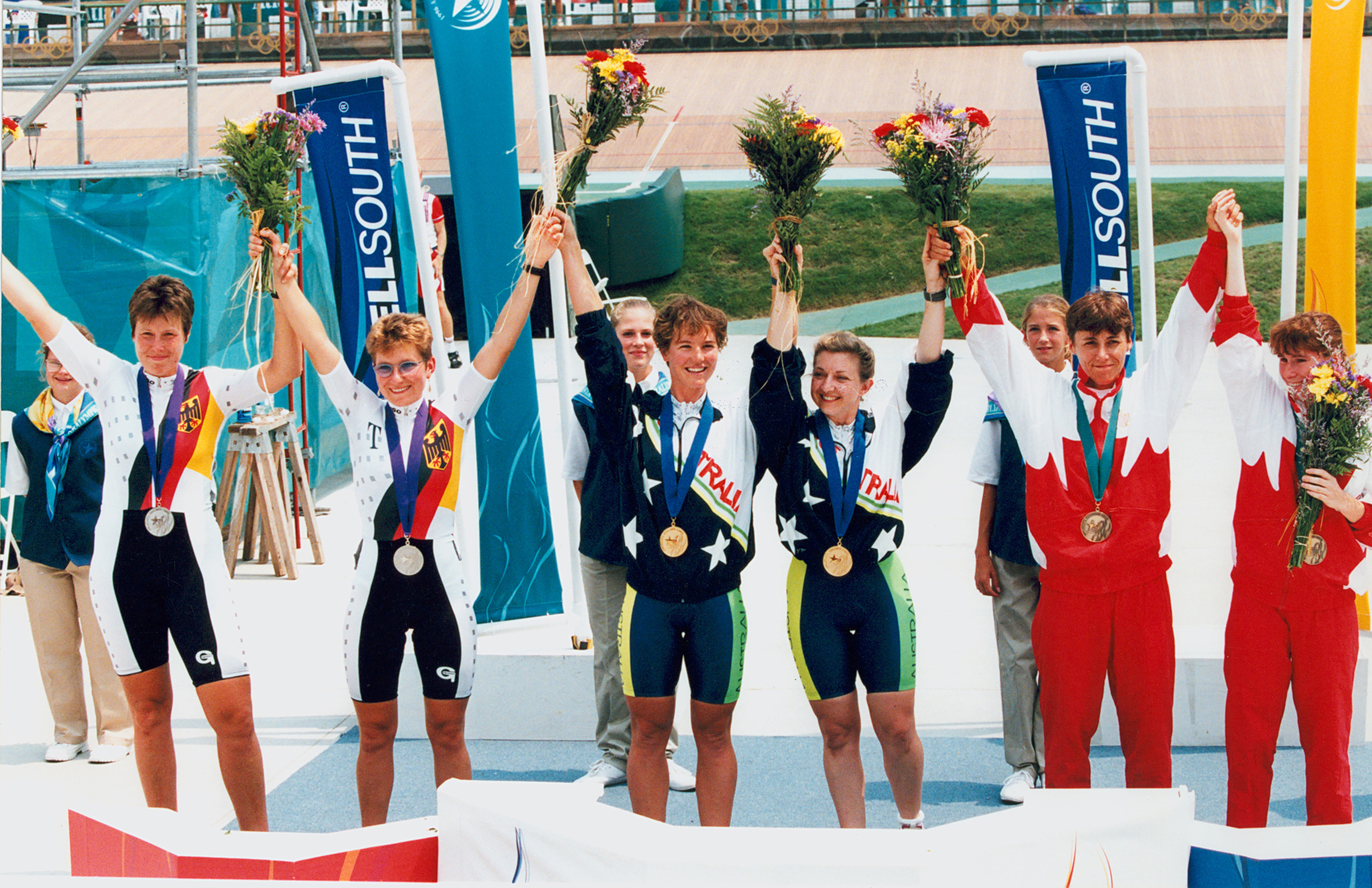
Australian vision impaired cyclist Teresa Poole and her pilot Sandra Smith on the medal dais after winning gold in the tandem class on the track at the 1996 Atlanta Paralympic Games

Event	Gold	Silver	Bronze
Mixed 1500 m time trial tricycle CP2	Guy Culot; Belgium	Andreas Hillers; Germany	Mutsuhiko Ogawa; Japan
Mixed 5000 m time trial bicycle CP3	Gary Longhi; Canada	Daniel Nicholson; United States	Shojiro Maeda; Japan
Mixed 5000 m time trial bicycle CP4	Christopher Scott; Australia	Peter Homann; Australia	Lawrence Schultz; United States
Mixed 5000 m time trial tricycle CP2	Mutsuhiko Ogawa; Japan	Guy Culot; Belgium	Corey Huntley; United States
Mixed 20k bicycle CP3	Daniel Nicholson; United States	Jong Kil Kim; South Korea	Gary Longhi; Canada
Mixed 20k bicycle CP4	Peter Homann; Australia	Christopher Scott; Australia	Lawrence Schultz; United States
Mixed 45/55k bicycle LC3	Luc Raoul; France	Beat Schwarzenbach; Switzerland	Norbert Zettler; Austria
Women's 50/60k tandem open	Canada (CAN); Guylaine Larouche; Julie Cournoyer	United States (USA); Tiffany Tretschiok; Julia Haft	Spain (ESP); Rosa Corral; Maria Chaves
Mixed 55/65k bicycle LC2	Patrick Ceria; France	Lubomir Simovec; Czech Republic	Patrice Bonneau; Canada
Mixed 60/70k tandem open	Canada (CAN); Alexandre Cloutier; Julie Cournoyer	Spain (ESP); Francisco José Lara; Belen Perez	Spain (ESP); José Santiago; Elena Padrones
Mixed 65/75k bicycle LC1	David Mercier; France	Wolfgang Mahler; Germany	Aage Joensberg; Norway
Men's 100/120k tandem open	France (FRA); Jean Bertrand; Franck Miquard	Italy (ITA); Pasquale Campedelli; Giancarlo Galli	Germany (GER); Martin Boesch; Frank Hoefle

=== Track cycling ===
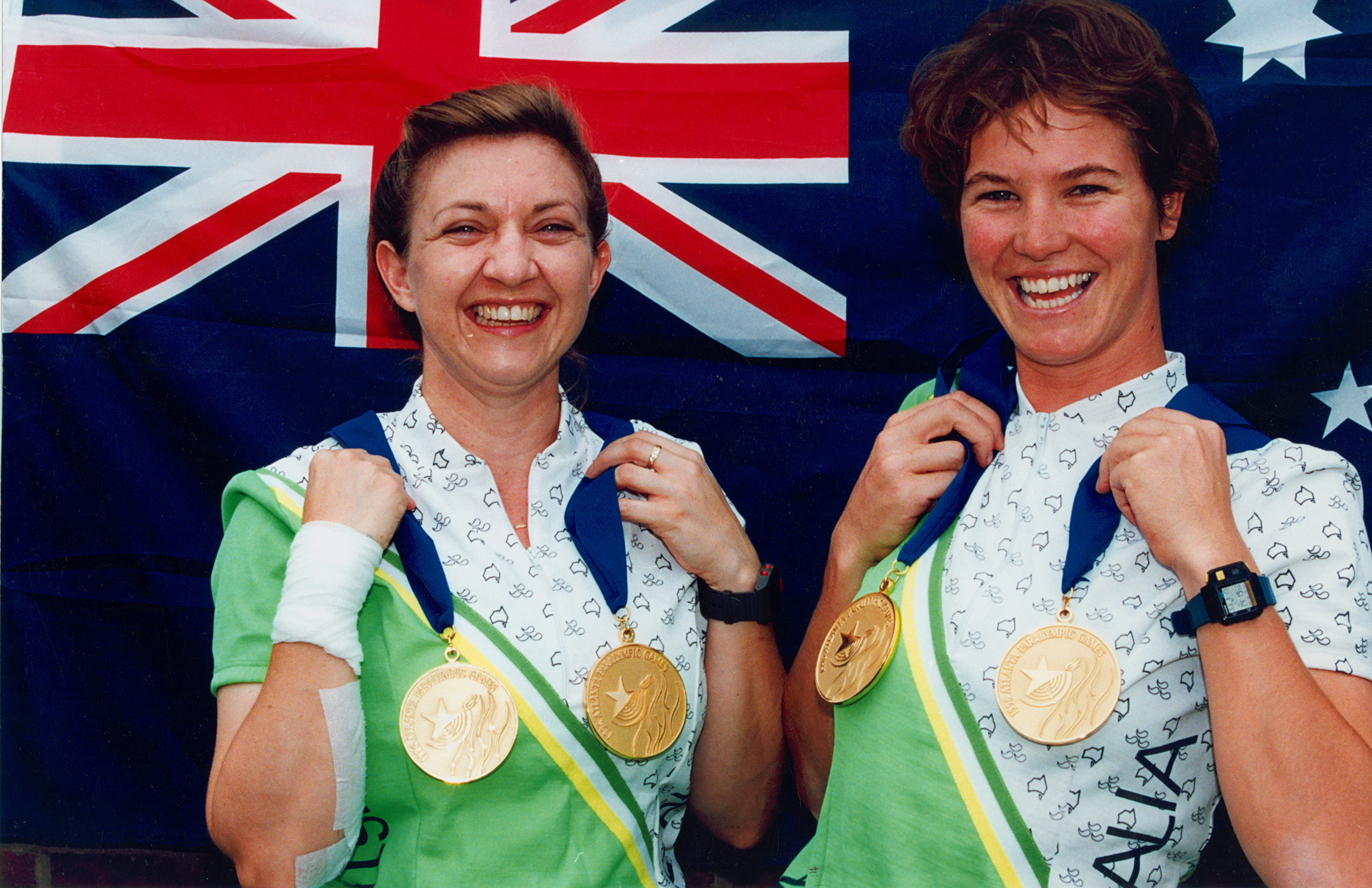
Australian tandem cyclists Terri Poole (right, vision impaired) and Sandra Smith (left, pilot for Terri) show off the gold medals they won in the 1km time trial and the 3km pursuit at the 1996 Atlanta Paralympic Games

Event	Gold	Silver	Bronze
Men's 200 m sprint tandem open	Italy (ITA); Paolo Botti; Giancarlo Galli	Slovakia (SVK); Pavel Takac; Miroslav Jambor	France (FRA); Eric Guezo; Vincent Mignon
Mixed 200 m sprint tandem open	Australia (AUS); Kerry Golding; Kieran Modra	Italy (ITA); Damiano Zanotti; Manuela Agnese	United States (USA); Scott Evans; Cara Dunne
Men's time trial tandem open	France (FRA); Thierry Gintrand; Patrice Senmartin	France (FRA); Eric Guezo; Vincent Mignon	Italy (ITA); Giancarlo Galli; Paolo Botti
Women's time trial tandem open	Australia (AUS); Sandra Smith; Teresa Poole	Germany (GER); Elfriede Ranz; Ursula Egner	Canada (CAN); Guylaine Larouche; Julie Cournoyer
Mixed time trial tandem open	Italy (ITA); Patrizia Spadaccini; Claudio Costa	United States (USA); Scott Evans; Cara Dunne	United States (USA); Michael Rosenberg; Pamela Fernandes
Men's individual pursuit tandem open	Netherlands (NED); Pascal Schoots; Jan Mulder	Australia (AUS); Eddy Hollands; Paul Clohessy	France (FRA); Guy Rouchovze; Herve Dechamp
Women's individual pursuit tandem open	Australia (AUS); Sandra Smith; Teresa Poole	Canada (CAN); Guylaine Larouche; Julie Cournoyer	United States (USA); Tiffany Tretschiok; Juila Haft
Mixed individual pursuit tandem open	Italy (ITA); Patrizia Spadaccini; Claudio Costa	United States (USA); Michael Hopper; Kathleen Urschel	Spain (ESP); Belén Perez; Francisco José Lara
Mixed omnium LC1	Wolfgang Eibeck; Austria	Matthew Gray; Australia	Aage Joensberg; Norway
Mixed omnium LC2	Dory Selinger; United States	Paul Lake; Australia	Patrick Ceria; France
Mixed omnium LC3	Miguel Perez; Spain	Rex Patrick; United States	Norbert Zettler; Austria

== See also ==
- Cycling at the 1996 Summer Olympics
