= Sweden at the 2022 Winter Paralympics =

- Flag of Sweden
- IPC code: SWE
- NPC: Swedish Parasports Federation
- Website: http://www.handikappidrott.se/

in Beijing, China 4 March 2022 – 13 March 2022
- Competitors: 9 (6 men and 3 women) in 4 sports
- Flag bearers: Viljo Petersson-Dahl; Kristina Ulander
- Medals Ranked 12th: Gold 2 Silver 2 Bronze 3 Total 7

Winter Paralympics appearances (overview)
- 1976; 1980; 1984; 1988; 1992; 1994; 1998; 2002; 2006; 2010; 2014; 2018; 2022; 2026

Sweden competed at the 2022 Winter Paralympics in Beijing, China, which was held between 4 and 13 March 2022.

== Medalists ==
The following Swedish competitors won medals at the games. In the discipline sections below, the medalists' names are bolded.

Medal	Name	Sport	Event	Date
Gold	Ebba Årsjö	Alpine skiing	Women's super combined, standing	7 March
Gold	Ebba Årsjö	Alpine skiing	Women's slalom, standing	12 March
Silver	Viljo Petersson-Dahl; Ronny Persson; Mats-Ola Engborg; Kristina Ulander; Sabina Johansson	Curling	Mixed	12 March
Silver	Zebastian Modin; Guide: Emil Jönsson Haag	Cross-country skiing	Men's 12.5 km, visually impaired	12 March
Bronze	Zebastian Modin; Guide: Emil Jönsson Haag	Cross-country skiing	Men's 1.5 km sprint, visually impaired	9 March
Bronze	Zebastian Modin; Guide: Emil Jönsson Haag	Cross-country skiing	Men's 20 kilometre classical, visually impaired	7 March
Bronze	Ebba Årsjö	Alpine skiing	Women's downhill, standing	5 March

Medals by sport
**Sport**	1st place, gold medalist(s)	2nd place, silver medalist(s)	3rd place, bronze medalist(s)	**Total**
Alpine skiing	2	0	1	**3**
Cross-country skiing	0	1	2	**3**
Curling	0	1	0	**1**
Total	2	2	3	7

Medals by gender
**Gender**	1st place, gold medalist(s)	2nd place, silver medalist(s)	3rd place, bronze medalist(s)	**Total**
Male	0	1	2	**3**
Female	2	0	1	**3**
Mixed	0	1	0	**1**
Total	2	2	3	7

== Competitors ==
The following is the list of number of competitors participating at the Games per sport.

Sport	Men	Women	Total
Alpine skiing	2	1	3
Biathlon	1	0	1 (Note: Zebastian Modin will take part in two sports; biathlon and cross-country skiing.)
Cross-country skiing	1	0	1
Wheelchair curling	3	2	5
Total	6	3	9

== Alpine skiing ==
Sweden competed in alpine skiing.

Men

Athlete	Classification	Event	Run 1		Run 2		Total	
Athlete	Classification	Event	Time	Rank	Time	Rank	Time	Rank
Aaron Lindström	Standing	Men's downhill	—N/a				1:18.21	6
Aaron Lindström	Standing	Men's giant slalom	Did not finish					
Aaron Lindström	Standing	Men's super combined	1:14.22	10	41.84	7	1:56.06	6
Aaron Lindström	Standing	Men's super-G	—N/a				1:13.41	10
Aaron Lindström	Standing	Men's slalom	46.49	12	Did not finish			
Arvid Skoglund	Standing	Men's downhill standing	—N/a				1:23.15	26
Arvid Skoglund	Standing	Men's giant slalom	Did not finish					
Arvid Skoglund	Standing	Men's super combined	1:17.41	23	46.16	16	2:03.57	18
Arvid Skoglund	Standing	Men's super-G	—N/a				Did not finish	
Arvid Skoglund	Standing	Men's slalom	49.96	23	56.11	14	1:46.07	15
Ebba Årsjö	Standing	Women's downhill	—N/a				1:23.20	3rd place, bronze medalist(s)
Ebba Årsjö	Standing	Women's giant slalom	56.14	2	Did not finish			
Ebba Årsjö	Standing	Women's super combined	1:16.02	2	40.49	1	1:56.51	1st place, gold medalist(s)
Ebba Årsjö	Standing	Women's super-G	—N/a				1:16.93	4
Ebba Årsjö	Standing	Women's slalom	44.99	1	46.77	1	1:31:76	1st place, gold medalist(s)

== Biathlon ==
Sweden competed in biathlon.

Men

Athlete	Event	Time	Misses	Rank
Zebastian Modin; Guide: Emil Jönsson Haag	6 km visually impaired	19:37.1	5	10

== Cross-country skiing ==
Arnt-Christian Furuberg was also qualified and selected to participate, but had to withdraw due to being infected with COVID-19. One cross-country skier represented Sweden.

Men's distance

Athlete	Event	Final	
Athlete	Event	Time	Rank
Zebastian Modin; Guide: Emil Jönsson Haag	12.5 km free visually impaired	33:59.1	2nd place, silver medalist(s)
Zebastian Modin; Guide: Emil Jönsson Haag	20 km classical visually impaired	1:00:05.4	3rd place, bronze medalist(s)

Sprint

Athlete	Event	Qualification		Semifinal		Final	
Athlete	Event	Time	Rank	Time	Rank	Time	Rank
Zebastian Modin; Guide: Emil Jönsson Haag	1.5 km sprint visually impaired	2:40.35	4 Q	3:37.3	2 Q	3:37.8	3rd place, bronze medalist(s)

== Wheelchair curling ==
Sweden qualified a team in wheelchair curling by winning bronze at the 2020 world championships and silver at the 2021 world championships.

Summary

Team	Event	Group stage											Semifinal	Final	
Team	Event	Opposition Score	Opposition Score	Opposition Score	Opposition Score	Opposition Score	Opposition Score	Opposition Score	Opposition Score	Opposition Score	Opposition Score	Rank	Opposition Score	Opposition Score	Rank
Viljo Petersson-Dahl; Ronny Persson; Mats-Ola Engborg; Kristina Ulander; Sabina Johansson	Mixed	SUI; W 9–2	CHN; W 5–1	LAT; L 7–9	CAN; W 6–3	EST; W 6–4	GBR; W 6–4	NOR; W 8–6	SVK; L 5–6	USA; W 10–7	KOR; L 4–10	3 Q	SVK; W 6–4	CHN; L 3–8	2nd place, silver medalist(s)

Round robin Final round-robin standings

Key
Teams to Playoffs

Country	Skip	W	L	W–L	PF	PA	EW	EL	BE	SE	S%	DSC
China	Wang Haitao	8	2	–	68	39	36	28	2	13	71%	122.32
Slovakia	Radoslav Ďuriš	7	3	2–0	65	57	40	33	1	16	65%	95.19
Sweden	Viljo Petersson-Dahl	7	3	1–1	66	52	37	35	3	18	68%	91.08
Canada	Mark Ideson	7	3	0–2	69	50	36	33	2	11	71%	95.29
United States	Matthew Thums	5	5	1–0	60	75	32	39	2	6	60%	70.98
South Korea	Go Seung-nam	5	5	0–1	64	59	35	37	0	11	64%	103.20
Norway	Jostein Stordahl	4	6	2–0	60	64	37	38	2	13	64%	107.82
Great Britain	Hugh Nibloe	4	6	1–1	67	56	37	36	0	16	62%	134.75
Latvia	Poļina Rožkova	4	6	0–2	61	71	40	32	0	18	63%	100.43
Estonia	Andrei Koitmäe	3	7	–	51	69	32	41	2	13	61%	106.21
Switzerland	Laurent Kneubühl	1	9	–	48	87	32	42	0	8	56%	109.27

Wheelchair curling round robin summary table
Pos.	Country	Canada	China	Estonia	Great Britain	Japan	Norway	Slovakia	South Korea	Sweden	Switzerland	United States	Record
4	Canada	—N/a	7–3	9–3	6–3	10–3	7–6	8–9	4–9	3–6	8–4	7–4	7–3
1	China	3–7	—	9–3	6–3	9–2	7–4	7–5	9–4	1–5	7–4	10–2	8–2
10	Estonia	3–9	3–9	—	5–10	6–5	8–3	6–7	2–5	4–6	8–6	6–9	3–7
8	Great Britain	3–6	3–6	10–5	—	8–4	5–7	3–7	6–8	4–6	15–1	10–6	4–6
9	Latvia	3–10	2–9	5–6	4–8	—	6–8	8–4	8–4	9–7	9–7	7–8	4–6
7	Norway	6–7	4–7	3–8	7–5	8–6	—	9–3	4–9	6–8	8–5	5–6	4–6
2	Slovakia	9–8	5–7	7–6	7–3	4–8	3–9	—	7–2	6–5	8–6	9–3	7–3
6	South Korea	9–4	4–9	5–2	8–6	4–8	9–4	2–7	—	10–4	7–8	6–7	5–5
3	Sweden	6–3	5–1	6–4	6–4	7–9	8–6	5–6	4–10	—	9–2	10–7	7–3
11	Switzerland	4–8	4–7	6–8	1–15	7–9	5–8	6–8	8–7	2–9	—	5–8	1–9
5	United States	4–7	2–10	9–6	6–10	8–7	6–5	3–9	7–6	7–10	8–5	—	5–5

Draw 1
Saturday, March 5, 14:35

Sheet A	1	2	3	4	5	6	7	8	Final
Switzerland (Kneubühl) 🔨	0	0	0	1	0	0	1	X	2
Sweden (Petersson-Dahl)	2	2	1	0	3	1	0	X	9

Draw 3
Sunday, March 6, 9:35

Sheet C	1	2	3	4	5	6	7	8	Final
China (Wang)	0	0	0	0	0	0	1	X	1
Sweden (Petersson-Dahl) 🔨	0	1	0	1	2	1	0	X	5

Draw 7
Monday, March 7, 14:35

Sheet D	1	2	3	4	5	6	7	8	Final
Latvia (Rožkova)	3	1	0	1	0	3	0	1	9
Sweden (Petersson-Dahl) 🔨	0	0	2	0	2	0	3	0	7

Draw 8
Monday, March 7, 19:35

Sheet C	1	2	3	4	5	6	7	8	Final
Sweden (Petersson-Dahl)	1	0	2	2	0	0	1	X	6
Canada (Ideson) 🔨	0	1	0	0	1	1	0	X	3

Draw 10
Tuesday, March 8, 14:35

Sheet B	1	2	3	4	5	6	7	8	Final
Sweden (Petersson-Dahl)	1	0	0	2	1	0	1	1	6
Estonia (Koitmäe) 🔨	0	1	1	0	0	2	0	0	4

Draw 11
Tuesday, March 8, 19:35

Sheet A	1	2	3	4	5	6	7	8	Final
Great Britain (Nibloe)	0	0	0	0	1	1	1	1	4
Sweden (Petersson-Dahl) 🔨	0	3	2	1	0	0	0	0	6

Draw 12
Wednesday, March 9, 9:35

Sheet B	1	2	3	4	5	6	7	8	EE	Final
Norway (Syversen)	1	0	2	0	0	0	1	2	0	6
Sweden (Petersson-Dahl) 🔨	0	1	0	2	2	1	0	0	2	8

Draw 13
Wednesday, March 9, 14:35

Sheet A	1	2	3	4	5	6	7	8	Final
Sweden (Petersson-Dahl) 🔨	3	0	0	1	0	0	1	0	5
Slovakia (Ďuriš)	0	1	2	0	1	1	0	1	6

Draw 15
Thursday, March 10, 9:35

Sheet D	1	2	3	4	5	6	7	8	Final
Sweden (Petersson-Dahl)	0	0	3	2	0	0	5	X	10
United States (Thums) 🔨	2	0	0	0	4	1	0	X	7

Draw 17
Thursday, March 10, 19:35

Sheet C	1	2	3	4	5	6	7	8	Final
South Korea (Jang) 🔨	1	1	1	0	0	5	2	X	10
Sweden (Petersson-Dahl)	0	0	0	1	3	0	0	X	4

Semifinal

Friday, March 11, 14:35

Sheet A	1	2	3	4	5	6	7	8	Final
Slovakia (Ďuriš) 🔨	0	0	0	3	1	0	0	0	4
Sweden (Petersson-Dahl)	1	1	1	0	0	1	1	1	6

Final

Saturday, March 12, 14:35

Team	1	2	3	4	5	6	7	8	Final
China (Wang) 🔨	0	1	0	0	4	0	3	X	8
Sweden (Petersson-Dahl)	0	0	1	1	0	1	0	X	3

== See also ==
- Sweden at the Paralympics
- Sweden at the 2022 Winter Olympics
