= Sweden at the 1998 Winter Paralympics =

- IPC code: SWE
- NPC: Swedish Parasports Federation

in Nagano
- Competitors: 24
- Flag bearer: Nils-Peter Kling
- Medals Ranked 19th: Gold 0 Silver 1 Bronze 5 Total 6

Winter Paralympics appearances (overview)
- 1976; 1980; 1984; 1988; 1992; 1994; 1998; 2002; 2006; 2010; 2014; 2018; 2022; 2026

Sweden competed at the 1998 Winter Paralympics in Nagano, Japan. 24 competitors from Sweden won 6 medals, 1 silver and 5 bronze, and finished 19th in the medal table.

== See also ==
- Sweden at the Paralympics
- Sweden at the 1998 Winter Olympics
