= Sweden at the 1980 Winter Paralympics =

- IPC code: SWE
- NPC: Swedish Parasports Federation

in Geilo
- Medals Ranked 4th: Gold 5 Silver 3 Bronze 8 Total 16

Winter Paralympics appearances (overview)
- 1976; 1980; 1984; 1988; 1992; 1994; 1998; 2002; 2006; 2010; 2014; 2018; 2022; 2026

Sweden competed at the 1980 Winter Paralympics in Geilo, Norway.

== See also ==
- Sweden at the Paralympics
- Sweden at the 1980 Winter Olympics
