= Sweden at the 2002 Winter Paralympics =

- IPC code: SWE
- NPC: Swedish Parasports Federation

in Salt Lake City
- Competitors: 19
- Flag bearer: Bengt-Gösta Johansson
- Medals Ranked 19th: Gold 0 Silver 6 Bronze 3 Total 9

Winter Paralympics appearances (overview)
- 1976; 1980; 1984; 1988; 1992; 1994; 1998; 2002; 2006; 2010; 2014; 2018; 2022; 2026

Sweden competed at the 2002 Winter Paralympics in Salt Lake City, United States. 19 competitors from Sweden won 9 medals, 6 silver and 3 bronze, and finished 19th in the medal table.

== Alpine skiing ==
Women

Athlete	Event	Run 1		Run 2		Total	
Athlete	Event	Time	Rank	Time	Rank	Time	Rank
Sonia Alfredsson	LW6/8						
Cecilia Paulson	Women's giant slalom LW12						2nd place, silver medalist(s)
Cecilia Paulson	Women's slalom LW12						2nd place, silver medalist(s)
Ronny Persson	Men's downhill LW10	Bye					3rd place, bronze medalist(s)
Ronny Persson	Men's giant-slalom LW10						2nd place, silver medalist(s)
Ronny Persson	Men's slalom LW10						2nd place, silver medalist(s)
Ronny Persson	Men's super-G LW10	Bye					2nd place, silver medalist(s)

== Cross-country skiing ==
Men's events

Athlete	Event	Final	
Athlete	Event	Time	Rank
Emil Östberg; Guide: Peter Rune	Men's 5 km classical technique B2		3rd place, bronze medalist(s)
Emil Östberg; Guide: Peter Rune	Men's 10 km free technique B2		2nd place, silver medalist(s)

== Ice sledge hockey ==
=== Summary ===
Key:

- A.E.T – After extra time.
- P – Match decided by penalty-shootout.

Team	Group Stage						Final / BM	
Team	Opposition Score	Opposition Score	Opposition Score	Opposition Score	Opposition Score	Rank	Opposition Score	Rank
Sweden men's	Canada; D 1–1	Estonia; W 4–1	Japan; W 4–2	Norway; L 3–8	United States; L 0–6	3	Canada; W 3–2^{P} A.E.T: 1–1	3rd place, bronze medalist(s)

=== Men's Tournament ===
Team: Mikael Axtelius, Daniel Cederstam, Dedjo Engmark, Marcus Holm, Niklas Ingvarsson, Rasmus Isaksson, Bengt-Gösta Johansson, Kenth Jonsson, Göran Karlsson, Jens Kask, Joakim Larsson, Mats Nyman, Leif Norgren, Frank Pedersen, Leif Wahlstedt

Team	GP	W	D	L	GF	GA	GD	Pts
United States (USA)	5	5	0	0	22	3	+19	10
Norway (NOR)	5	3	0	2	18	8	+10	6
Sweden (SWE)	5	2	1	2	12	18	−6	5
Canada (CAN)	5	1	2	2	8	12	−4	4
Estonia (EST)	5	1	1	3	8	20	−12	3
Japan (JPN)	5	1	0	4	5	12	−7	2

== See also ==
- Sweden at the Paralympics
- Sweden at the 2002 Winter Olympics
