= Sweden at the 1960 Summer Paralympics =

- IPC code: SWE (SVE used at these Games)
- NPC: Swedish Parasports Federation

in Rome
- Competitors: 3 in 1 sport
- Medals Ranked 18th: Gold 0 Silver 0 Bronze 0 Total 0

Summer Paralympics appearances (overview)
- 1960; 1964; 1968; 1972; 1976; 1980; 1984; 1988; 1992; 1996; 2000; 2004; 2008; 2012; 2016; 2020; 2024

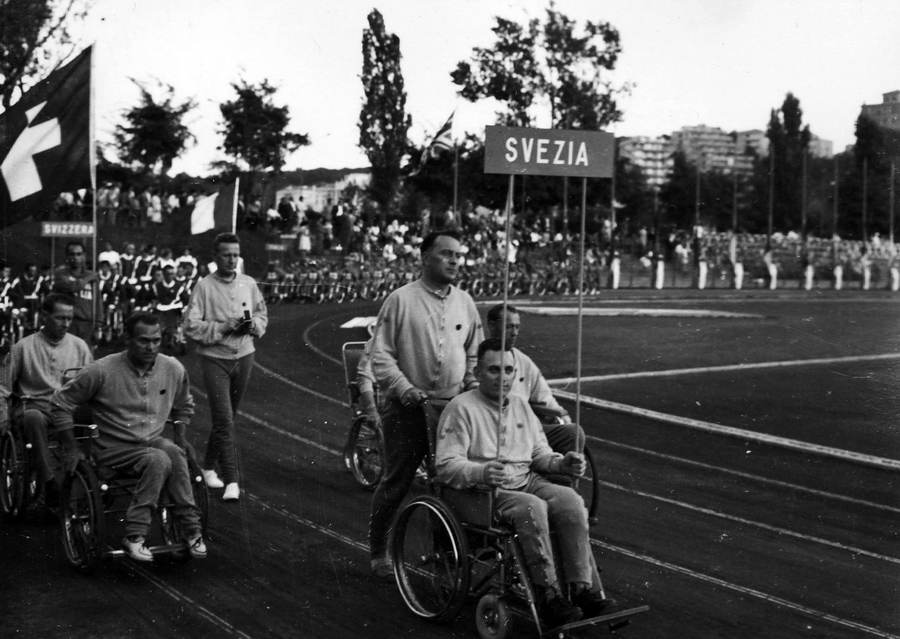
Sweden at Rome 1960

Sweden participated in the inaugural Paralympic Games in 1960 in Rome. The 1960 Paralympics, now considered to have been the first Paralympic Games, were initially known as the ninth Stoke Mandeville Games. The Stoke Mandeville Games were founded for athletes with disabilities in Great Britain in 1948.

Sweden fielded 3 competitors, all in archery. They paid for their own trip. Sweden did not win any medals at the 1960 Games.

== See also ==
- Sweden at the 1960 Summer Olympics
