= Alpine skiing at the 1992 Winter Paralympics – Men's super-G B1 =

Men's Super-G B1 at the V Paralympic Winter Games
- Competitors: 4 from 4 nations

Medalists
1st place, gold medalist(s)		Bruno Kuehne	Austria
2nd place, silver medalist(s)		Greg Evangelatos	United States
3rd place, bronze medalist(s)		Mats Linder	Sweden

The Men's Super-G B1 was one of the events held in Alpine skiing at the 1992 Winter Paralympics in Tignes and Albertville, France.

There were 4 competitors in the final.

Bruno Kuehne won his only Paralympic medal at this event.

== Results ==
=== Final ===
Rank	Athlete	Time
1st place, gold medalist(s)	Bruno Kuehne (AUT)	2:43.87
2nd place, silver medalist(s)	Greg Evangelatos (USA)	2:58.16
3rd place, bronze medalist(s)	Mats Linder (SWE)	3:13.05
	Willy Mercier (BEL)	4:23.51
