= Sweden at the 1976 Winter Paralympics =

- IPC code: SWE
- NPC: Swedish Parasports Federation

in Örnsköldsvik
- Competitors: 16 in 1 sport
- Flag bearer: Kjell Hörnblad
- Medals Ranked 5th: Gold 6 Silver 7 Bronze 7 Total 20

Winter Paralympics appearances (overview)
- 1976; 1980; 1984; 1988; 1992; 1994; 1998; 2002; 2006; 2010; 2014; 2018; 2022; 2026

Sweden was the host country of the inaugural Winter Paralympic Games in 1976, in Örnsköldsvik. The country was represented by 16 athletes (9 men and 7 women). This was only the sixth largest delegation, despite Sweden being the host nation. Swedes competed exclusively in cross-country skiing; the host country was thus unrepresented in alpine skiing.

Sweden won a total of twenty medals (of which six were gold, seven silver and seven bronze), placing it fifth on the medal table.

Sweden's gold medallists at the Örnsköldsvik Games were:

- the women's 3×5 km relay team (categories A-B): Karin Gustavsson, Astril Nilsson and Birgitta Sund
- Karin Gustavsson in the women's 5 km (B)
- Birgitta Sund in the women's 5 km and 10 km (A)
- Bertil Lundmark in the men's 5 km and 10 km (II)

== See also ==
- Sweden at the 1976 Winter Olympics
- Sweden at the 1976 Summer Paralympics
