= Claudio Costa (parathlete) =

Italian paralympic athlete

Personal information
- National team: Italy
- Born: 26 September 1963 (age 63) Italy
- Spouse: Cristina Bozzetta

Sport
- Sport: Para athletics; Para cycling
- Disability: Visually impaired
Medal record
Event	1st	2nd	3rd
Paralympic Games	2	1	3

Claudio Costa (born 26 September 1963) is a former Italian a paralympic multi-sport athlete who won six medals at the Summer Paralympics from 1992 to 2000.

== Achievements ==
Year	Competition	Venue	Rank	Event
Para athletics
1988	Summer Paralympics	(South Korea) Seoul	2nd	400 m B1
1988	Summer Paralympics	(South Korea) Seoul	3rd	400 m B1
1992	Summer Paralympics	(Spain) Barcelona	3rd	4 × 400 m B1-B3
Para cycling
1996	Summer Paralympics	(United States) Atlanta	1st	Mixed time trial tandem open (Note: Guide Patrizia Spadaccini)
1996	Summer Paralympics	(United States) Atlanta	1st	Mixed individual pursuit tandem open
2000	Summer Paralympics	(Australia) Sydney	3rd	Mixed sprint tandem open (Note: Guide Serenella Bortolotto)

== See also ==
- Italian multiple medallists at the Summer Paralympics
