= Sweden at the 2000 Summer Paralympics =

- IPC code: SWE
- NPC: Swedish Parasports Federation

in Sydney
- Competitors: 88 in 12 sports
- Flag bearer: Håkan Ericsson
- Medals Ranked 29th: Gold 5 Silver 6 Bronze 10 Total 21

Summer Paralympics appearances (overview)
- 1960; 1964; 1968; 1972; 1976; 1980; 1984; 1988; 1992; 1996; 2000; 2004; 2008; 2012; 2016; 2020; 2024

Sweden competed at the 2000 Summer Paralympics in Sydney, Australia, from 18 October to 29 October 2000.

== Medalists ==
Medal	Name	Sport	Event
Gold	Johnny Eriksson	Table tennis	Men's singles class 6
Gold	Jonas Jacobsson	Shooting	Men's free rifle 3×40 SH1
Gold	Jonas Jacobsson	Shooting	Mixed free rifle prone SH1
Gold	Thomas Johansson	Shooting	Mixed air rifle prone SH2
Gold	Thomas Johansson	Shooting	Mixed air rifle standing SH2
Silver	Håkan Ericsson	Athletics	Men's 100 m T54
Silver	Tim Johansson	Athletics	Men's 800 m T51
Silver	Madelene Nordlund	Athletics	Women's 200 m T53
Silver	Madelene Nordlund	Athletics	Women's 400 m T53
Silver	Håkan Ericsson	Athletics	Men's 1500 m T52
Silver	Nora Prochazka	Swimming	Women's 100 m breaststroke SB5
Bronze	Fredrik Andersson	Table tennis	Men's singles class 10
Bronze	Sofia Dettmann	Athletics	Women's 400 m T54
Bronze	Håkan Ericsson	Athletics	Men's 200 m T54
Bronze	Jan-Krister Gustavsson; Ernst Bolldén	Table tennis	Men's teams class 5
Bronze	Victor Göransson	Athletics	Men's long jump F42
Bronze	Jonas Jacobsson	Shooting	Men's air rifle standing SH1
Bronze	Jonas Jacobsson	Shooting	Mixed air rifle prone SH1
Bronze	Mattias Karlsson	Table tennis	Men's singles class 6
Bronze	Helena Gustavsson; Malin Gustavsson; Josefine Jälmestål; Anna Nilsson; Lena Saarensalo; Sarah Winberg	Goalball	Women's team
Bronze	Jimmy Björkstrand; Niklas Hultqvist; Torsten Karlsson; Boris Samuelsson; Mikael Stahl; Niklas Wetterström	Goalball	Men's team

== Competitors ==
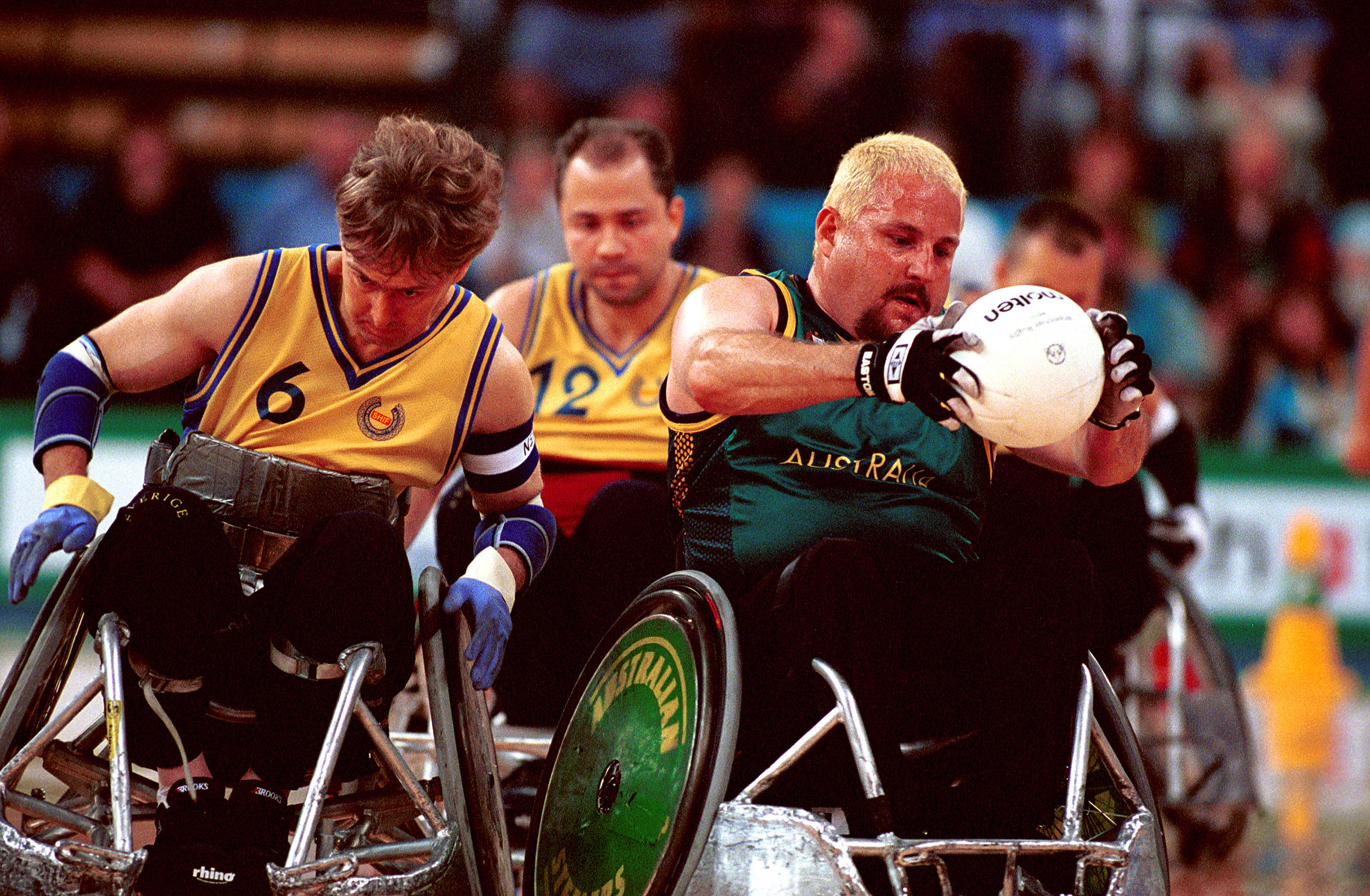
Sweden's wheelchair rugby team in action against hosts Australia at the 2000 Games

At the 200 Paralympic Games Sweden sent 88 athletes competing for medals in 17 disciplines.

=== Archery ===
- Roger Eriksson
- Siv Thulin

=== Athletics ===
- Thomas Brandhild (F37 Discus, Shot put)
- Magnus Bärtfors (T20 1500m)
- Sofia Dettmann (T54 100m, 200m, 400m, 800m)
- Håkan Ericsson (T54, 100m, 200m, 400m)
- Klas Ersson (F20 High jump)
- Viktor Göransson (F42 Long jump, F42 100m)
- Tim Johansson (T51 200m, 400m, 800m, 1500m)
- Christer Lenander (T38 100m, 200m)
- Andreas Nordin (F13 Discus, Shot put, Javelin)
- Kasper Nordlinder (T37 1500m, 5000m)
- Madelene Nordlund (T53 200m, 400m, 800m, 5000m, marathon)
- Hakan Sahlberg (F20 Javelin, Shot put)
- Per Vesterlund (T52 800m, 1500m, 5000m)
- Emil Oestberg (T13 5000m)

=== Equestrian ===
- Kerstin Englund
- Ida Gustafsson
- Helena Hagberg
- Ida Landahl
- Sahra Rydh

=== Goalball ===
==== Men ====
- Jimmy Björkstrand
- Niklas Hultqvist
- Torsten Karlsson
- Boris Samuelsson
- Mikael Stahl
- Niklas Wetterström

==== Women ====
- Helena Gustavsson
- Malin Gustavsson
- Josefine Jälmestål
- Anna Nilsson
- Lena Saarensalo
- Sarah Winberg

=== Powerlifting ===
- Jonas Celin (men's 56 kg)

=== Sailing ===
- Carl-Gustaf Fresk (sonar)
- Lars Bagge (sonar)
- Jan-Olof Edbom (sonar)
- Lars Löfström (sonar)
- Claes Hultling (2.4 mR)

=== Shooting ===
- Jonas Jacobsson
- Thomas Johansson
- Anders Lundvall
- Kenneth Pettersson
- Björn Samuelsson

=== Swimming ===
- Karin Bergek
- Daniel Bergström
- Sandra Erikson
- Stefan Larsson
- David Lega
- Nora Prochazka
- Alex Racoveanu
- Simon Åhlstad

=== Table tennis ===
- Fredrik Andersson
- Magnus Andrée
- Robert Bader
- Ernst Bolldén
- Johnny Eriksson
- Jan-Christer Gustavsson
- Simon Itkonen
- Jörgen Johansson
- Mattias Karlsson
- Örjan Kylevik

=== Wheelchair basketball ===
- Enoch Ablorh
- Lars-Gunnar Andersson
- Gunnar Berglund
- Daniel Flensburg
- Joachim Gustavsson
- Hussein Haidari
- Per Jameson
- Peter Kohlström
- Per Uhlen
- Christian Wapner
- Stefan Wegeborn
- Thomas Åkerberg

=== Wheelchair rugby ===
- Tomas Engblom
- Thomas Eriksson
- Magnus Gunnarsson
- Ulf Josefsson
- Per-Arne Kulle
- Kristoffer Lindberg
- Andreas Lundgren
- Jan-Owe Mattsson
- Jesper Nilsson
- Magnus Olers
- Loa Rissmar
- Haci Sak

=== Wheelchair tennis ===
- Andreas Westman
- Peter Wikström

== See also ==
- Sweden at the 2000 Summer Olympics
- Sweden at the Paralympics
