= Sweden at the 1994 Winter Paralympics =

- IPC code: SWE
- NPC: Swedish Parasports Federation

in Lillehammer
- Competitors: 27
- Flag bearer: Gunnar From
- Medals Ranked 8th: Gold 3 Silver 3 Bronze 2 Total 8

Winter Paralympics appearances (overview)
- 1976; 1980; 1984; 1988; 1992; 1994; 1998; 2002; 2006; 2010; 2014; 2018; 2022; 2026

Sweden competed at the 1994 Winter Paralympics in Lillehammer, Norway. 27 competitors from Sweden won 8 medals including 3 gold, 3 silver and 2 bronze and finished 8th in the medal table.

== See also ==
- Sweden at the Paralympics
- Sweden at the 1994 Winter Olympics
