= John Houston (skier) =

Canadian para-alpine skier

Sport
- Country: Canada
- Sport: Para-alpine skiing
Medal record
Paralympic Games
Bronze medal – third place	1988 Innsbruck	Giant Slalom B1

John Houston is a Canadian para-alpine skier. He represented Canada at the 1988 Winter Paralympics.

He competed in the Men's Downhill B1 and the Men's Giant Slalom B1 events.

He won the bronze medal in the Men's Giant Slalom B1 event. He was disqualified in the Men's Downhill B1 event.

== See also ==
- List of Paralympic medalists in alpine skiing
