= Archery at the 1984 Summer Paralympics – Men's double FITA round team integrated =

Men's double FITA round team integrated at the VII Paralympic Games
- Paralympic Archery
- Competitors: 9 from 3 nations

Medalists
1st place, gold medalist(s)		S. Ahlinder; Nicolai Babkin; Arne Tjernell	Sweden
2nd place, silver medalist(s)		Rene Ducret; George Hamart; Daniel Lelon	France
3rd place, bronze medalist(s)		Manfred Boeckers; Manfred Brenne; Kilmar Butenhoff	West Germany

The Men's double FITA round team integrated was an archery competition at the 1984 Summer Paralympics.

The Swedish team won the gold medal.

== Results ==
Rank	Team	Points
1st place, gold medalist(s)	Sweden (SWE)	6422
2nd place, silver medalist(s)	France (FRA)	6327
3rd place, bronze medalist(s)	West Germany (FRG)	6320
