= Julie Cournoyer =

Canadian para-cyclist (born 1970/71)

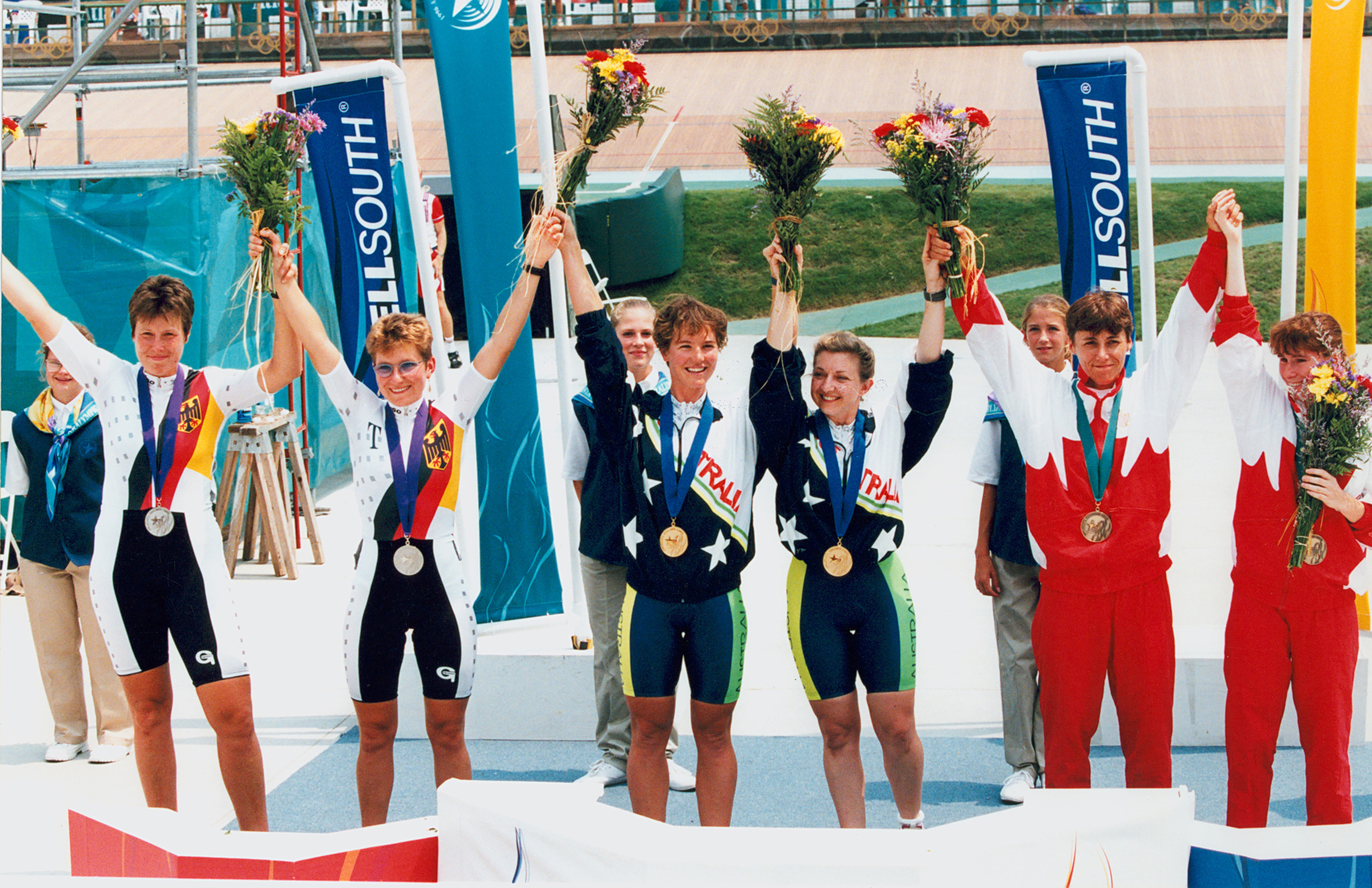

Personal information
- National team: Canada
- Born: 1970 or 1971 (age 55–56) Sherbrooke, Quebec, Canada
- Years active: 1996–2002
- Spouse: Sylvain Lambert

Sport
- Country: Canada
- Sport: Para-cycling
- Disability: Visual impairment
- Retired: 2002
Medal record
Women's Para-cycling
Event	1st	2nd	3rd
Paralympic Games	2	2	2
IPC Cycling World Championships	0	1	1
Total	2	3	3
Representing Canada
Paralympic Games
Gold medal – first place	1996 Atlanta	Women's 50/60k tandem open
Gold medal – first place	1996 Atlanta	Mixed 60/70k tandem open
Silver medal – second place	1996 Atlanta	Women's individual pursuit tandem open
Silver medal – second place	2000 Sydney	Mixed tandem open
Bronze medal – third place	1996 Atlanta	Women's time trial tandem open
Bronze medal – third place	2000 Sydney	Mixed individual pursuit tandem open
IPC Cycling World Championships
Silver medal – second place	1998 Colorado Springs	Time trial
Bronze medal – third place	1998 Colorado Springs	35km event

Julie Cournoyer (born 1970 or 1971) is a Canadian visually impaired former para-cyclist who competed in the Paralympic Games and the IPC Cycling World Championships. She won two gold medals at the 1996 Summer Paralympics in Atlanta, United States and won a silver and bronze medal at each of the former multi-sport event and at the 2000 Summer Paralympics in Sydney, Australia, Cournoyer won a single silver and bronze medal each at the 1998 IPC Cycling World Championships in Colorado Springs, United States. She had Guylaine Larouche, Alexandre Cloutier and Christophe Cheseaux as guides throughout her career.

== Early life and education ==
Cournoyer was born in approximately 1970 to 1971, and comes from Sherbrooke in Quebec. She is blind; her vision deteriorated when she was a child and her sight is estimated to be between one and two percent from which she can see only shadows. Cournoyer attended the Université de Sherbrooke and studied for a master's degree in social work. She did skiing from the age of eighteen upon learning the Montreal Association of the Blind organized ski days with guides.

== Career ==
She was able to compete at the 1996 Summer Paralympics in Atlanta, United States after a fundraising programme was held enough raise sponsorship funding. No quotas were reserved for blind athletes but Cournoyer qualified for the newly introduced tandem events since two athletes with cerebral palsy had used two of their five spots reserved to them. She and her guide Guylaine Larouche trained on a non-competition hybrid bicycle used during the 1976 Summer Olympics in Montreal and loaned a bike for the Paralympics from the Veterans Cycling Federation president. With her guide and former national Canadian team cyclist Larouche, Cournoyer won the bronze medal at the women's 1 km (0.62 mi) time trial tandem open event by finishing third on August 17.

On the following day, she and Larouche placed second to earn the silver medal at the women's 3,000 m (9,800 ft) track individual pursuit tandem open for the visually impaired. Two days after that, Cournoyer and Larouche finished first in the women's 56 km (35 mi) tandem open road race after completing 7 1/2 laps for the gold medal. Her final race at the Atlanta Paralympics was the mixed 65 km (40 mi) tandem open road race with male guide Alexandre Cloutier on August 22. The two came in the first place to claim the gold medal.

Following the Paralympics, she attended a ceremony to celebrate the achievements of Quebec athletes competing in Atlanta and received a gift painting from Lucien Bouchard, the Premier of Quebec. Cournoyer received further recognition of her achievements during a reception held at Sherbrooke City Hall on September 16. She and Larouche went on to win the silver medal and finished the highest-placed female pairing in the 21 km (13 mi) velo-tandem race held as part of the Défi sportif in Montreal in early May 1997. The pair subsequently won the Critérium de Catalogne and came second at an international competition in Montjuïc, Spain. At the 1998 Défi sportif, she and Cloutier performed a final-minute sprint to claim the silver medal for the mixed 21 km (13 mi) tandem cycling road event.

Cournoyer and Cloutier finished first amongst Canadians and ninth overall in an international mixed category event held in Belgium at the end of May 1998. She attained qualification to the 1998 IPC Cycling World Championships in Colorado Springs, United States by finishing second at the time trial and 53 km (33 mi) road race events in Belleville, Ontario. Cournoyer teamed up with Cloutier to win the silver medal in the 14 km (8.7 mi) time trial and bronze in the 35 km (22 mi) event. In July 1999, she and Cloutier finished three seconds adrift for second place in the Canadian Tandem Cycling Championship in Vancouver that was composed of a time trial and road event. The following year, Cournoyer finished second in each of the Handisport BT1 and Tandem races of the Canadian National Road Race Championships in Peterborough, Ontario.

She was later paired with guide Pascal Choquette when Cloutier was competing in the United States and won the bronze medal at the time trial event of the Quebec Cycling Championships. Cournoyer competed in four events at the 2000 Summer Paralympics in Sydney, Australia. She and Cloutier won Canada's first medal of the 2000 Paralympics when she claimed the silver by finishing second in the mixed tandem open individual pursuit race. The duo went on to place sixth in the mixed track 1 km (0.62 mi) time trial tandem open and seventh in the mixed track sprint tandem open. Cournoyer and Cloutiter came third for the bronze medal in the mixed tandem open road race and this was the sixth and final Paralympic medal she claimed in her career.

In 2001, she told Cloutier his services were no longer needed and replaced him with Swiss guide Christophe Cheseaux. The duo ventured to Switzerland to compete in the European Cycling Championships and won the bronze medal in the 1 km (0.62 mi) time trial tandem open event. The following year, Cournoyer won the mixed tandem and mixed tandem kilo events in the Canadian National Road Race Championships in Bromont, Quebec. After finishing fourth in the mixed 1 km (0.62 mi) time trial and sixth in the 3 km (1.9 mi) pursuit event of the 2002 UCI Para-cycling Track World Championships in Germany, she ended her career in August 2002 by telling Cheseaux of her decision.

== Personal life ==
She is married to Sylvain Lambert and gave birth to a child in 2005. Cournoyer received recognition for her sporting achievements from the Association sportive des aveugles du Québec in 2014.
