= María del Carmen Chaves Calvo =

Spanish cyclist (born 1967)

María Chaves
Personal information
- Full name: María del Carmen Chaves Calvo
- Nationality: Spanish
- Born: 13 January 1967 (age 59) Hospitalet de Llobregat, Spain

Sport
- Country: Spain
- Sport: Cycling
Medal record
Women's road cycling
Representing Spain
Paralympic Games
Bronze medal – third place	1996 Atlanta	50/60k tandem open

María del Carmen Chaves Calvo (born 13 January 1967 in Hospitalet de Llobregat) is a blind cyclist from Spain. She competed at the 1996 Summer Paralympics. She finished third in the tandem road race.
