= Archery at the 1984 Summer Paralympics – Men's double short metric round tetraplegic =

Men's double short metric round tetraplegic at the VII Paralympic Games
- Paralympic Archery
- Competitors: 1 from 1 nation

Medalists
1st place, gold medalist(s)		Kenneth Holm	Sweden

The Men's double short metric round tetraplegic was an archery competition at the 1984 Summer Paralympics.

The Swedish archer Kenneth Holm won the gold medal unopposed.

== Results ==
Rank	Athlete	Points
1st place, gold medalist(s)	Kenneth Holm (SWE)	1129
