= Greg Evangelatos =

American para-alpine skier

Sport
- Country: United States
- Sport: Para-alpine skiing; Cycling
Medal record
Paralympic Games
Gold medal – first place	1992 Albertville	Giant Slalom B1
Silver medal – second place	1992 Albertville	Super-G B1
Silver medal – second place	1992 Barcelona	Mixed Tandem Road

Greg Evangelatos is an American para-alpine skier and cyclist. He represented the United States at the 1984 Winter Paralympics and at the 1992 Winter Paralympics in alpine skiing. In 1992, he won the gold medal in the Men's Giant Slalom B1 event and the silver medal in the Men's Super-G B1 event. At the Men's Giant Slalom B1 event he was the only competitor to receive a medal.

He also represented the United States in the 1992 Summer Paralympics in cycling. He won the silver medal in the Mixed Tandem Open event with partner Liz Heller. This feat made him the first American male to win a medal in both the Winter and Summer Paralympics.
