= Per Uhlén =

Swedish professor and researcher of molecular biology

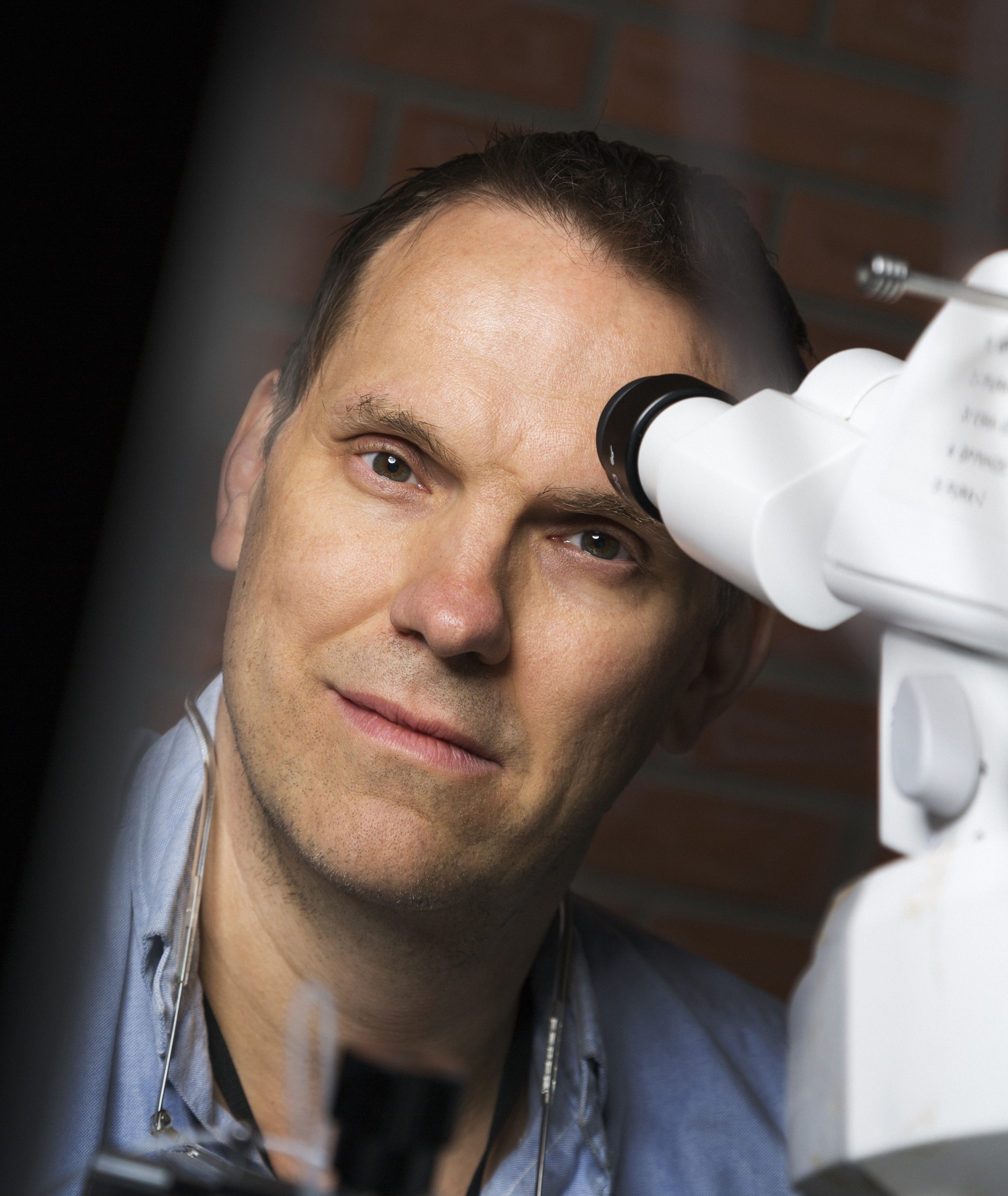
- Born: 1969 (age 56–57); Uppsala, Sweden
- Education: Karolinska Institutet (PhD), Kungliga Tekniska Högskolan (MSc), Yale University (Postdoc), Marine Biology Laboratory (Postdoc)
- Occupation: Professor
- Employer: Karolinska Institute
- Website: www.uhlenlab.org

Per Uhlén, born in 1969 in Uppsala, is a Swedish researcher in cell and molecular biology and professor of cell signaling at Karolinska Institute in Stockholm. Uhlén conducts research about cell signaling and how different cues affect important biological processes for cancer and development, such as cell division, cell differentiation and cell death. Uhlén is also conducting research using three-dimensional (3D) imaging with light sheet fluorescence microscopy and tissue clearing to map and characterize intact tumor samples and whole brains.

Uhlén began studying engineering physics (Teknisk Fysik) at the Royal Institute of Technology (KTH) in Stockholm in 1993 and graduated with a master's degree in engineering in 1998. He then began doctoral studies at Karolinska Institute and became a doctor of philosophy (PhD) in 2002 with the thesis "Signal Transduction Via Ion Fluxes". After his dissertation, Uhlén moved to the United States to conduct postdoctoral research in Barbara Ehrlich's laboratory at Yale University in New Haven, CT. During his postdoc stay in the United States, Uhlén also conducted research at the Marine Biology Laboratory (MBL) in Woods Hole, MA. In 2006, Uhlén returned to Sweden to establish his own research group at Karolinska Institute. Uhlén became an associate professor (Docent) in 2009 and a full professor in 2014.

Uhlén has participated in two Paralympic Games in Atlanta (1996) and Sydney (2020), where he played wheelchair basketball in Sweden at the 2000 Summer Paralympics and also played in a rock band with Atomic Swing's frontman Niclas Frisk.
