= María Belén Perez Sanchez =

Spanish cyclist

Belén Perez
Personal information
- Full name: María Belén Perez Sanchez
- Nationality: Spanish
- Born: 5 January 1973 (age 53) Granada, Spain

Sport
- Country: Spain
- Sport: Cycling
Medal record
Representing Spain
Women's cycling
Paralympic Games
Silver medal – second place	1992 Barcelona	Mixed tandem open
Silver medal – second place	1996 Atlanta	Mixed 60/70k tandem open
Bronze medal – third place	1996 Atlanta	Mixed individual pursuit tandem open

María Belén Perez Sanchez (born 5 January 1973 in Granada) is a cyclist from Spain. She has a vision impairment. She competed at the 1992 summer Paralympics and 1996 Summer Paralympics. She finished second in the Tandem Road Race. She finished third in the Tandem Individual Pursuit track race.
