= Willi Hohm =

Austrian para-alpine skier

Sport
- Country: Austria
- Sport: Para-alpine skiing
Medal record
Paralympic Games
Bronze medal – third place	1988 Innsbruck	Downhill B1

Willi Hohm is an Austrian para-alpine skier. He won the bronze medal in the Men's Downhill B1 event at the 1988 Winter Paralympics in Innsbruck, Austria. He also represented Austria at the 1976 Winter Paralympics and at the 1984 Winter Paralympics.

== See also ==
- List of Paralympic medalists in alpine skiing
