= Elena María del Rocio Padrones Nieto =

Spanish cyclist

Elena Padrones
Personal information
- Full name: Elena Maria del Rocio Padrones Nieto
- Nationality: Spanish
- Born: 2 May 1973 (age 53) Valladolid, Spain

Sport
- Country: Spain
- Sport: Cycling
Medal record
Women's road cycling
Representing Spain
Paralympic Games
Bronze medal – third place	1996 Atlanta	Mixed 60/70k tandem open

Elena Maria del Rocio Padrones Nieto (born 2 May 1973 in Valladolid) is a cyclist from Spain. She has a vision impairment. She competed at the 1996 Summer Paralympics. She finished third in the tandem road race.
