= Gary Longhi =

Canadian Paralympic cyclist (1964–2020)

Personal information
- Born: 2 July 1964 Montreal, Quebec, Canada
- Died: 2 July 2020 (aged 56) Montreal, Quebec, Canada

Sport
- Country: Canada
- Sport: Paralympic cycling
- Retired: 2001
Medal record
Paralympic cycling
Representing Canada
Paralympic Games
Gold medal – first place	1996 Atlanta	Mixed 5000m time trial CP3
Silver medal – second place	1992 Barcelona	Men's 5000m time trial CP3
Bronze medal – third place	1996 Atlanta	Mixed 20km road race CP3

Gary Longhi (2 July 1964 - 2 July 2020) was a Canadian Paralympic cyclist who competed in road cycling elite events and took part in four Paralympic Games from 1988 to 2000. He was the first Canadian para-cyclist to be inducted into the Canadian Cycling Hall of Fame in 2017. In 1983, Longhi was involved in a serious motorcycle crash which resulted in a life changing brain injury and was severely disabled. He spent three months in a coma and had a tracheotomy.

Longhi died on his 56th birthday after going through euthanasia for two cancers, one of which was incurable.
