= Sweden at the 1992 Winter Paralympics =

- IPC code: SWE
- NPC: Swedish Parasports Federation

in Tignes-Albertville
- Competitors: 9
- Flag bearer: Torbjörn Ek
- Medals Ranked 12th: Gold 1 Silver 1 Bronze 2 Total 4

Winter Paralympics appearances (overview)
- 1976; 1980; 1984; 1988; 1992; 1994; 1998; 2002; 2006; 2010; 2014; 2018; 2022; 2026

Sweden competed at the 1992 Winter Paralympics in Tignes/Albertville, France. 9 competitors from Sweden won 4 medals including 1 gold, 1 silver and 2 bronze and finished joint 12th in the medal table with Australia.

== See also ==
- Sweden at the Paralympics
- Sweden at the 1992 Winter Olympics
