= Bruno Kuehne =

Austrian para-alpine skier and cyclist

Sport
- Country: Austria
- Sport: Para-alpine skiing; Cycling
Medal record
Paralympic Games
Gold medal – first place	1992 Tignes-Albertville	Super-G B1

Bruno Kuehne is an Austrian para-alpine skier. He won the gold medal in the Men's Super-G B1 event at the 1992 Winter Paralympics held in Tignes and Albertville, France. He also represented Austria at the 1988 Winter Paralympics and at the 1994 Winter Paralympics. At the 1996 Summer Paralympics he competed in several cycling events.

== See also ==
- List of Paralympic medalists in alpine skiing
