= Sweden at the 1988 Winter Paralympics =

- IPC code: SWE
- NPC: Swedish Parasports Federation

in Innsbruck
- Medals Ranked 9th: Gold 3 Silver 7 Bronze 5 Total 15

Winter Paralympics appearances (overview)
- 1976; 1980; 1984; 1988; 1992; 1994; 1998; 2002; 2006; 2010; 2014; 2018; 2022; 2026

Sweden competed at the 1988 Winter Paralympics in Innsbruck, Austria. They obtained 3 gold metals, 7 silver metals, and 5 bronze medals.

== See also ==
- Sweden at the Paralympics
- Sweden at the 1988 Winter Olympics
