= Teresa Poole =

Australian Paralympic tandem cyclist

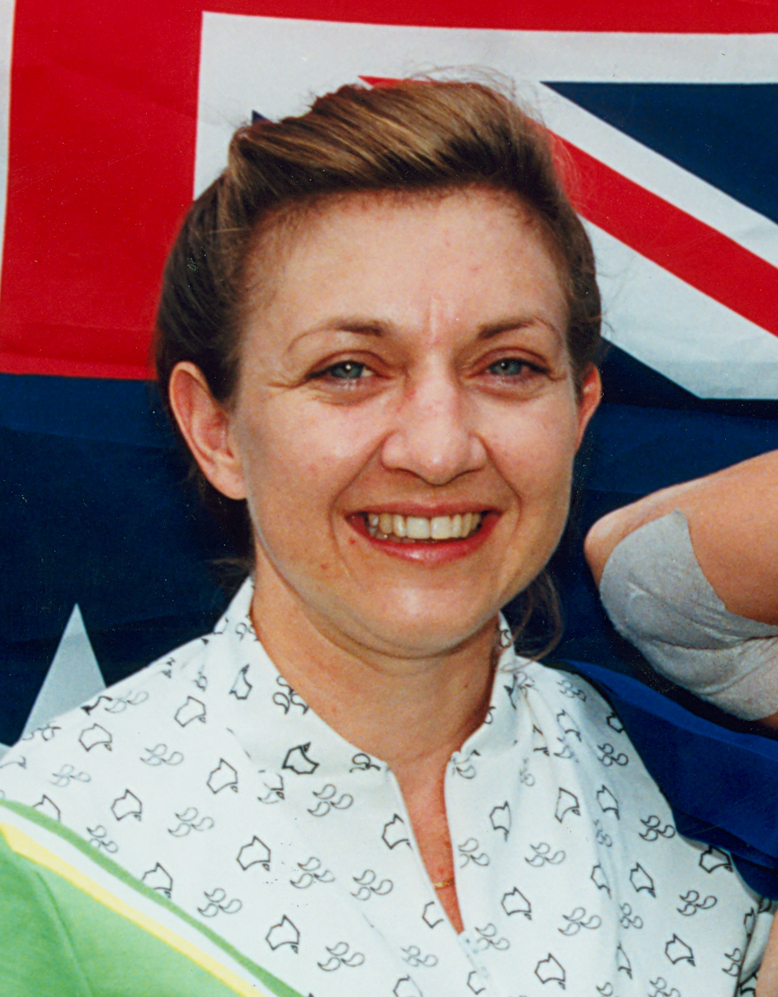
- Teresa Poole at the 1996 Summer Paralympics

Personal information
- Full name: Teresa Hilda Poole
- Born: 28 January 1964 (age 62) Manchester, United Kingdom

Cycling career
- Sport: Cycling
- Disciplines: Track & Road
- Role: Rider
Medal record
Track cycling
Paralympic Games
Gold medal – first place	1996 Atlanta	Women's Individual Pursuit Tandem open
Gold medal – first place	1996 Atlanta	Women's Kilo Tandem open
IPC Track and Road World Championships
Gold medal – first place	1994 Hasselt	Women's Time Trial B & VI
Gold medal – first place	1994 Hasselt	Women's Individual Pursuit B & VI
Gold medal – first place	1994 Hasselt	Women's Sprint B & VI
Gold medal – first place	1994 Hasselt	Women's Road Race B & VI

Teresa "Terri" Hilda Poole, OAM (born 28 January 1964) is an English-born Australian Paralympic tandem cyclist with a vision impairment. She was born in the English city of Manchester. She competed at the 1996 Atlanta Games, where she won two gold medals in the Women's Individual Pursuit Tandem open and the Women's Kilo Tandem open track cycling events, for which she received a Medal of the Order of Australia. Her pilot was Sandra Smith. She competed in the Women's 50/60k Tandem open event for road cycling but did not medal.

Poole received an Australian Sports Medal in 2000. In 2001, she held five world records in tandem cycling. She was an Australian Institute of Sport scholarship holder in 1996 and 1997.

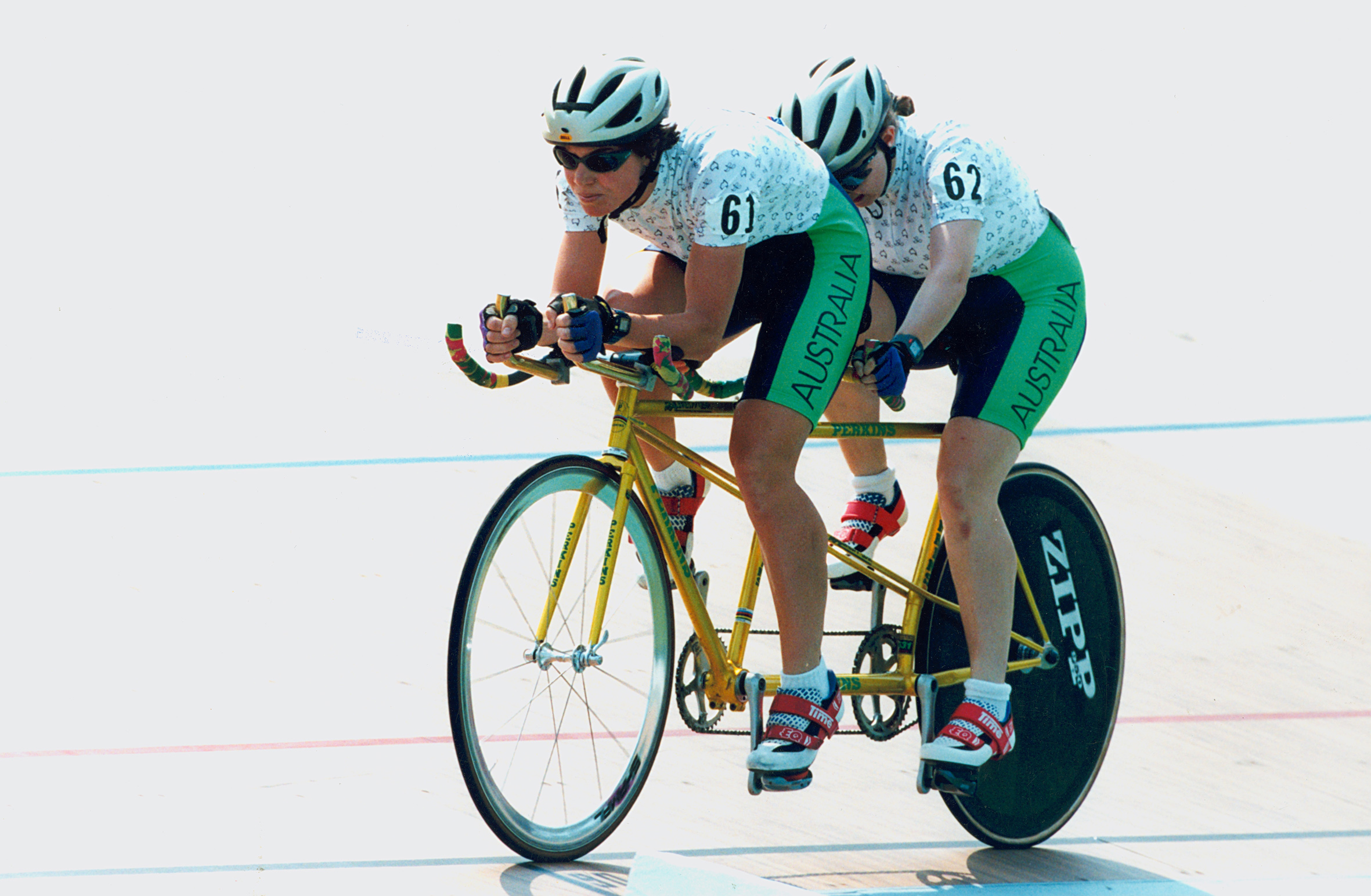
Poole and Smith on their way to one of their two gold medals at the 1996 Atlanta Paralympic Games
