= Sweden at the Paralympics =

- IPC code: SWE
- NPC: Swedish Parasports Federation
- Medals: Gold 263 Silver 268 Bronze 222 Total 753

Summer appearances
- 1960; 1964; 1968; 1972; 1976; 1980; 1984; 1988; 1992; 1996; 2000; 2004; 2008; 2012; 2016; 2020; 2024

Winter appearances
- 1976; 1980; 1984; 1988; 1992; 1994; 1998; 2002; 2006; 2010; 2014; 2018; 2022; 2026

Sweden first competed at the Paralympic Games in 1960, at the 1960 Summer Paralympics. Sweden first won a medal at the Paralympics in 1964, at the Summer Games in Tokyo, Japan.

Sweden was also the host country of the inaugural Winter Paralympic Games, in 1976 in Örnsköldsvik.

== Medals ==
=== Medals by Summer Games ===
Games	Gold	Silver	Bronze	Total
1960 Rome	0	0	0	0
1964 Tokyo	0	0	1	1
1968 Tel-Aviv	1	6	4	11
1972 Heidelberg	5	6	6	17
1976 Toronto	21	28	25	74
1980 Arnhem	31	36	24	91
1984 New York and Stoke Mandeville	83	43	34	160
1988 Seoul	42	38	23	103
1992 Barcelona and Madrid	16	33	19	68
1996 Atlanta	12	14	11	37
2000 Sydney	5	6	10	21
2004 Athens	8	7	6	21
2008 Beijing	5	3	4	12
2012 London	4	4	4	12
2016 Rio de Janeiro	1	4	5	10
2020 Tokyo	1	5	2	8
2024 Paris	0	1	2	3
Totals (17 entries)	235	234	180	649

=== Medals by Winter Games ===
Games	Gold	Silver	Bronze	Total
1976 Örnsköldsvik*	6	7	7	20
1980 Geilo	5	3	8	16
1984 Innsbruck	7	2	5	14
1988 Innsbruck	3	7	5	15
1992 Tignes-Albertsville	1	1	2	4
1994 Lillehammer	3	3	2	8
1998 Nagano	0	1	5	6
2002 Salt Lake City	0	6	3	9
2006 Turin	0	0	1	1
2010 Vancouver	0	0	2	2
2014 Sochi	1	2	1	4
2018 Pyeongchang	0	1	0	1
2022 Beijing	2	2	3	7
2026 Milano Cortina	3	0	4	7
Totals (14 entries)	31	35	48	114

=== Medals by Summer Sport ===
Games	Gold	Silver	Bronze	Total
Archery	4	5	3	12
Athletics	55	52	36	143
Dartchery	1	0	0	1
Equestrian	4	0	4	8
Goalball	0	1	4	5
Judo	0	0	1	1
Powerlifting	5	0	2	7
Shooting	23	10	16	49
Swimming	105	113	74	292
Table tennis	16	27	23	66
Volleyball	0	1	1	2
Weightlifting	11	6	1	18
Wheelchair basketball	0	0	1	1
Wheelchair fencing	0	2	0	2
Wheelchair tennis	1	2	0	3
Totals (15 entries)	225	219	166	610

=== Medals by Winter Sport ===
Games	Gold	Silver	Bronze	Total
Alpine skiing	15	12	10	37
Biathlon	1	2	2	5
Cross-country skiing	14	20	27	61
Ice sledge speed racing	0	0	3	3
Para ice hockey	1	0	2	3
Wheelchair curling	0	1	3	4
Totals (6 entries)	31	35	47	113

== Multi-medalists ==
Swedish athletes who have won at least three gold medals or five or more medals of any colour.

=== Summer Paralympics ===
No.	Athlete	Sport	Years	Games	Gender	Gold	Silver	Bronze	Total
1	Jonas Jacobsson	Shooting	1980–2016	10	M	17	4	9	30
2	Magdalena Tjernberg	Swimming	1984–1988	2	F	10	3	0	13
3	Annelie Ahrenstrand	Swimming	1980–1984	2	F	9	1	0	10
4	Anders Olsson	Swimming	2004–2012	3	M	3	1	3	7
5	Håkan Ericsson	Athletics	1988–1992, 2000	3	M	1	4	4	9
6	Maja Reichard	Swimming	2012–2016	2	F	1	2	2	5

=== Winter Paralympics ===
No.	Athlete	Sport	Years	Games	Gender	Gold	Silver	Bronze	Total
1	Ebba Årsjö	Alpine skiing	2022–2026	2	F	5	0	2	7
2	Gunilla Ahren	Alpine skiing	1984–1988	2	F	4	1	1	6
3	Zebastian Modin	Cross-country skiing	2010–2026	5	M	0	4	6	10

== See also ==
- Sweden at the Olympics
