= Sandra Smith (cyclist) =

Australian Paralympic cyclist

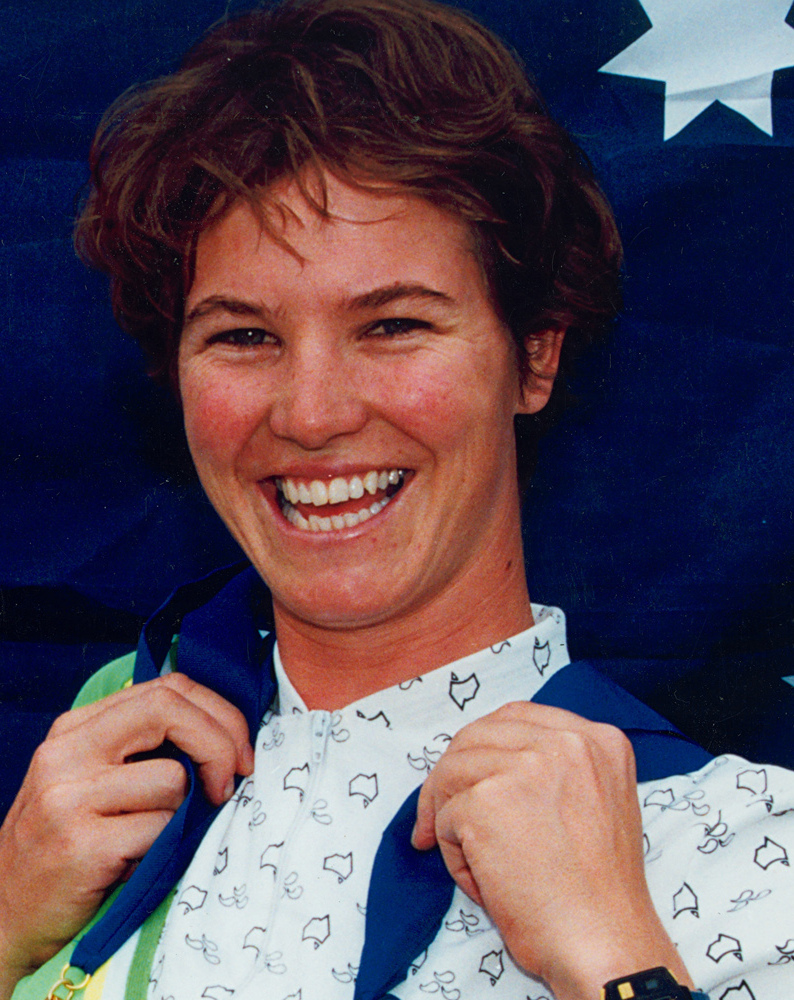
- Sandra Smith at the 1996 Paralympics

Personal information
- Full name: Sandra Narelle Smith
- Nationality: Australia
- Born: 23 May 1968 (age 58) Merredin, Western Australia
Medal record
Cycling
Paralympic Games
Gold medal – first place	1996 Atlanta	Women's Individual Pursuit Tandem open
Gold medal – first place	1996 Atlanta	Women's Kilo Tandem open
IPC Track and Road World Championships
Gold medal – first place	1994 Hasselt	Women's Time Trial B & VI
Gold medal – first place	1994 Hasselt	Women's Individual Pursuit B & VI
Gold medal – first place	1994 Hasselt	Women's Speed B & VI
Gold medal – first place	1994 Hasselt	Women's 50km B & VI

Sandra Narelle Smith, OAM (born 23 May 1968) is an Australian Paralympic tandem cycling pilot.

She was born on 23 May 1968 in Merredin, Western Australia. She won two gold medals at the 1996 Atlanta Games in the Women's Individual Pursuit Tandem open and Women's Kilo Tandem open events with Teresa Poole, for which she received a Medal of the Order of Australia. In 2000, she received an Australian Sports Medal.
