= Miguel Ángel Pérez Tello =

Spanish cyclist and skier (born 1957)

Personal information
- Nationality: Spanish

Sport
- Country: Spain
- Sport: Cycling
Medal record
Men's cycling
Representing Spain
Paralympic Games

Miguel Ángel Perez Tello (born 10 February 1957 in Granada) is a skier and bicyclist from Spain. He cannot use part of one leg. He is a type LC3 bicycle athlete. He raced at the 1988 Winter Paralympics in para-Nordic skiing. He was the second skier in the 10 km race and the second skier in the 2.5 km race. He raced at the 1992 Winter Paralympics in para-Nordic skiing. He was the second skier in the 2.5 km race. He raced at the 1996 Summer Paralympics on a bicycle. He was the fastest to go Omnium Track race.
