= Swedish Parasport Federation =

National Paralympic Committee of Sweden

Swedish Parasport Federation and Swedish Paralympic Committee

National Paralympic Committee
- Country: Sweden
- Code: SWE
- Created: 1969
- Continental association: EPC
- Headquarters: Stockholm, Sweden
- President: Asa Llinares Norlin
- Website: www.parasport.se; www.paralympics.se

The Swedish Parasport Federation and Swedish Paralympic Committee (Swedish: Svenska Parasportförbundet och Sveriges Paralympiska Kommitté), also known as Parasport Sweden (Swedish: Parasport Sverige), is the umbrella organization for parasport in Sweden.

It was formerly known as the Swedish Sports Organization for the Disabled and Swedish Paralympic Committee (Swedish: Svenska Handikappidrottsförbundet och Sveriges Paralympiska Kommitté or SHIF/SPK) and earlier the Swedish Sports Organization for the Disabled (Swedish: Svenska Handikappidrottsförbundet or SHIF). The current name was adopted during a meeting in Malmö on 9 May 2015.

It is the National Paralympic Committee in Sweden for the Paralympic Games movement. It's a non-profit organisation that selects teams, and raises funds to send Swedish competitors to Paralympic events organised by the International Paralympic Committee (IPC).

The organisation was founded in 1969, and became a member of the Swedish Sports Confederation the same year.

== See also ==
- Sweden at the Paralympics
- Swedish Olympic Committee
