= Adrienne Smith =

Adrienne Smith may refer to:

- Adrienne Smith (sport administrator), Australian sport administrator
- Adrienne J. Smith, American psychologist
- Adrienne Smith (American football), women’s tackle football player and entrepreneur
- Adrienne Smith, guitarist with The Iron Maidens

== See also ==
- Adrian Smith (disambiguation)
