= Australia at the 2006 Winter Paralympics =

- IPC code: AUS
- NPC: Australian Paralympic Committee
- Website: www.paralympic.org.au

in Turin
- Competitors: 10 in 3 sports
- Flag bearer: Opening Ceremony: Michael Milton Closing Ceremony: Toby Kane
- Medals Ranked 13th: Gold 0 Silver 1 Bronze 1 Total 2

Winter Paralympics appearances (overview)
- 1976; 1980; 1984; 1988; 1992; 1994; 1998; 2002; 2006; 2010; 2014; 2018; 2022; 2026

Australia participated in the 2006 Winter Paralympics in Torino, Italy, from 10 to 19 March 2006. The Turin games represented Australia's ninth appearance at the Winter Paralympic Games. Australia were represented by 10 athletes, which made it their largest ever Winter Paralympic Games contingent. Australia competed in three sports: alpine skiing, biathlon, and cross-country skiing, but not ice sledge hockey or wheelchair curling. Prior to the games, the Australian Paralympic Committee set a target of two medals, down from the seven that were won four years earlier in Salt Lake City. This was due to the retirement of three-time medallist Bart Bunting, as well as changes made to the disability classification system. This target was met with Australia winning a silver and a bronze medal to finish equal 13th on the medal tally.

Notable Australian performances included:

- Emily Jansen, a below-knee amputee skier, was Australia's first ever female Winter Paralympic competitor.
- James Millar, who was born without his right forearm, was Australia's first Paralympic Cross-Country skier since Peter Rickards in 1980. He also competed in the Biathlon.
- Michael Milton, a leg amputee skier, who won a silver medal in the standing downhill competition in his fifth and final Winter Paralympic Games.
- Toby Kane, a leg amputee skier, who at 19 years old was the youngest member of the Australian team. He won a bronze medal in the standing Super-G.

== Background ==
The 2006 Winter Paralympics took place in Turin, Italy. This was the second time the country had hosted the Paralympics, following the 1960 Summer games in Rome, and the first time the Winter Paralympics had been hosted in Italy.

This was Australia's ninth appearance at the Winter Paralympics, having competed in every games since the inception of the Winter Paralympics in Örnsköldsvik, Sweden in 1976. These games also represented Australia's largest ever contingent to be sent to the Winter Paralympics, with 10 athletes, including the countries first ever female Winter Paralympian, Emily Jansen.

=== Logo ===
The 2006 Winter Paralympics marked the debut appearance of the new Paralympic logo. The logo was officially approved in 2003, but due to time restraints, was not used at the 2004 Summer Paralympics in Athens. With three coloured elements, or 'agitos', which is Latin for 'I move' encircling a single middle point, the logo represents the International Paralympic Committee (IPC) bringing athletes from all corners of the earth to a single location to enable them to compete with and against each other. It also represents the IPC's new motto, "Spirit in Motion". The colours chosen represent the three colours that are most widely represented on national flags from around the world, red, blue, and green.

As part of the revamped look, the logo will be displayed with the logos of National Paralympic Committees and organising committees as of the Torino games. The logo chosen for the 2006 Winter Paralympic games used the colours displayed on the Paralympic logo with a similar logo design to that of the 2006 Winter Olympics.

=== Mascot ===
The official mascot of the 2006 Winter Paralympic Games was Aster, the star-shaped snowflake. The snowflake was chosen as snowflakes are unique, and so to are the athletes competing in the Paralympics. It aims to depict the originality of the athletes, rather than focusing on their disabilities The complexity and originality of the mascot represents the unique way in which an individual can practice sport, and also their unique way in life. The mascot was designed by Pedro Albuquerque.

=== Opening ceremony ===
The opening ceremony was held on 10 March at the Stadio Olimpico, Turin. The ceremony was attended by an audience of approximately 25,000 people, and was officially opened by President Carlo Azeglio Ciampi. The theme for the opening ceremony was 'overcoming limitations', which celebrated those who chose not to surrender.

Alpine skier, and gold medal winning Winter Paralympian, Michael Milton was given the honour of official flag bearer for the opening ceremony in his final Winter Paralympic games.

== Media coverage ==
The Torino Paralympics saw unprecedented media coverage on Australian television, with ABC Television gaining exclusive broadcast rights. For the duration of the games, the ABC broadcast a nightly 30-minute prime-time highlights programme on the networks main channel, which was hosted by ABC Sports presenter Shaun Giles, as well as a replay on the digital channel ABC2. In addition, the ABC held a one-hour special highlights broadcast of the opening ceremony and day 1 of competition. For their coverage, the ABC was awarded the 2007 Paralympic Media Award for best Broadcast Coverage by the International Paralympic Committee (IPC).

The 2006 Paralympics also saw history made, with the IPC in conjunction with Narrowtep Inc., launching a live internet television channel dedicated to the broadcasting of the Games free around the world via web-stream. President of the IPC Sir Phillip Craven officially launched the channel on February 20, 2006, stating "For the Torino 2006 Paralympic Winter Games, ParalympicSport.TV is expected to provide over 100 hours of live coverage from all four winter sports - Alpine skiing, Ice Sledge Hockey, Nordic Skiing and Wheelchair Curling - as well as the Opening and Closing ceremonies." In addition the channel also streamed daily highlights of the best performances each day. As of 2016 the channel is no longer active, however the IPC do still live stream Paralympic games on their official YouTube page.

In total, there were 871 media articles produced relating to the Winter Olympics in Australia, with 134 print articles, 410 television stories, and 327 on the radio, reaching a total combined audience of approximately 34,707,153 people.

== Medal tally ==
Further information on the medal tally : 2006 Winter Paralympics Medal Table

With one silver and one bronze medal, Australia finished the games placed equal thirteenth overall, tied with Slovakia, Spain, and Switzerland. This result was Australia's equal fourth best result in Winter Paralympic history, equal with the Nagano 1998 games where they won a gold and a bronze medal.

Rank	Nation	Gold	Silver	Bronze	Total
1	Russia	13	13	7	33
2	Germany	8	5	5	18
3	Ukraine	7	9	9	25
4	France	7	2	6	15
5	United States	7	2	3	12
6	Australia	0	1	1	2
Totals (6 entries)		42	32	31	105

== Medallists ==
Further information on the final medallists: 2006 Winter Paralympics Medallists

Medal	Name	Sport	Event
Silver	Michael Milton	Alpine skiing	Men's Downhill Standing
Bronze	Toby Kane	Alpine skiing	Men's Super-G standing

== Classifications ==
Every participant at the Winter Paralympics is grouped into one of five categories based on their disability type. These categories are:

- Amputation: The minimum qualification for this category is at least one major joint or limb is missing. This condition may be congenital or sustained through illness or injury.
- Cerebral Palsy: A disorder of movement and posture due to damage to areas of the brain that affect the participants balance, movement and general muscle control.
- Vision Impairment/ Blindness: Any condition which interferes with 'normal' range of vision, can range from requiring contact lenses or glasses, to full blindness.
- Wheelchair Athletes: Athletes in wheelchairs often also fall into one of the other categories as well.
- Les Autres: Any physical disability that is not covered under any of the other categories. This includes such disorders as dwarfism, congenital deformities of the limb, and multiple sclerosis.

For the Torino games, changes have been implemented to the classifications of the Alpine skiing event, where the 'three class system' will be used, which had previously been used in the World Cup events for several years prior. This system categorises athletes into 3 competition groups: standing, sitting, and vision impaired. Skiers with a physical impairment who compete in the 'standing' class are classified from Locomotor Winter (LW)1-9: LW1-4 are athletes with lower limb impairment, LW5-8 are athletes with upper limb impairment, and LW9 classification is for athletes with a combination of upper and lower limb impairment. Classification classes LW10-12 are for skiers in the sit-ski event, with physical impairment affecting the legs. For the vision impaired event, athletes compete with a guide and are split into 3 classifications: B1-3, with B1 skiers having limited visual acuity in both eyes.

== Events ==
=== Alpine skiing ===
The Alpine skiing events were held at the Kandhar Banchetta - Giovanni Nasi slope, at the Borgata venue in Sestriere, 100 km from the city of Turin.

In the Alpine skiing discipline, there are four separate events an athlete may compete in. These are:

- Downhill: Each competitor completes one run down a long, steep course which includes obstacles such as jumps and turns, and gates which must be passed through. Failure to do so results in disqualification.
- Slalom: Competitors complete two runs down two separate courses over a single day. The Slalom course are generally shorter than those for the other Alpine events, but have a much higher number of gates that must be passed through (55-75 for men and 40-60 for women). The penalty for missing a gate is disqualification. The times for the two runs are added together and the winner is the competitor with the combined fastest time.
- Giant slalom: Competitors complete two runs down two separate courses over a single day. While the Slalom uses a shorter course with a large number of gates, the giant slalom uses a longer course with fewer turns which are wider and smoother. The penalty for missing a gate is disqualification, and the winner is the competitor with the fastest combined time over the two courses.
- Super-G: A speed event where athletes complete one run down a course that is shorter than the downhill but longer than the other alpine events. The number of gates to be passed through is dependent on the vertical drop of the course, but must include 35 direction changes for the men and 30 for women, and gates must be set at least 25m apart. The penalty for missing a gate is disqualification.

The alpine skiing competition was by far the most represented event by Australian athletes, with all but one member of the team competing in one or more of the Alpine skiing events. Shannon Dallas was Australia's sole competitor in the sitting classification events, while Scott Adams, Dean Calabrese, Toby Kane, Marty Mayberry, Michael Milton, Cameron Rahles-Rahbula, Nicholas Watts, and Emily Jansen all competed in the standing events.

Emily Jansen also made Australian Winter Paralympic history as the first female to ever represent Australia at the Winter Paralympics.

Results

Men

Athlete	Event	Time	Calculated Time	Rank
Scott Adams	Men's Downhill Standing	1:32.40	1:32.17	40
Scott Adams	Men's giant slalom Standing	2:14.44	2:13.46	40
Scott Adams	Men's slalom Standing	1:42.15	1:41.17	38
Scott Adams	Men's Super-G Standing	1:21.47	1:21.07	46
Dean Calabrese	Men's Downhill Standing	1:40.23	1:35.55	44
Dean Calabrese	Men's giant slalom Standing	2:17.32	2:07.57	34
Dean Calabrese	Men's slalom Standing	1:53.30	1:41.10	37
Dean Calabrese	Men's Super-G Standing	1:27.96	1:21.26	47
Toby Kane	Men's Downhill Standing	1:27.92	1:23.20	9
Toby Kane	Men's giant slalom Standing	DNF	-	-
Toby Kane	Men's slalom Standing	1:27.10	1:27.10	16
Toby Kane	Men's Super-G Standing	1:18.06	1:12.03	3rd place, bronze medalist(s)
Marty Mayberry	Men's Downhill Standing	1:33.96	1:27.94	33
Marty Mayberry	Men's giant slalom Standing	2:08.47	1:59.14	21
Marty Mayberry	Men's slalom Standing	1:39.88	1:27.76	19
Marty Mayberry	Men's Super-G Standing	DNF	-	-
Michael Milton	Men's Downhill Standing	1:24.40	1:19.86	2nd place, silver medalist(s)
Michael Milton	Men's giant slalom Standing	2:04.93	1:54.74	13
Michael Milton	Men's slalom Standing	1:24.20	1:24.20	9
Michael Milton	Men's Super-G Standing	1:19.77	1:13.61	12
Cameron Rahles-Rahbula	Men's Downhill Standing	DNF	-	-
Cameron Rahles-Rahbula	Men's giant slalom Standing	DNF	-	-
Cameron Rahles-Rahbula	Men's slalom Standing	1:25.87	1:25.87	14
Cameron Rahles-Rahbula	Men's Super-G Standing	DNF	-	-
Nicholas Watts	Men's Downhill Standing	1:27.89	1:27.67	31
Nicholas Watts	Men's giant slalom Standing	2:03.79	2:02.90	27
Nicholas Watts	Men's slalom Standing	1:35.13	1:34.22	30
Nicholas Watts	Men's Super-G Standing	1:18.01	1:17.63	33
Shannon Dallas	Men's Downhill Sitting	DNF	-	-
Shannon Dallas	Men's giant slalom Sitting	2:27:80	2:05:22	18
Shannon Dallas	Men's Super-G Sitting	1:33:22	1:23:20	

Women

Athlete	Event	Time	Calculated Time	Rank
Emily Jansen	Women's giant slalom Standing	2:50.06	2:00.18	21
Emily Jansen	Women's slalom Standing	DNF	-	-

=== Cross-country skiing ===
The Nordic Skiing events (Cross-country skiing and Biathlon) were held in the valley at Pragelato Commune, which was located at an altitude of 1620m.

Cross-country skiing is only open to those athletes with a physical impairment, or blindness/vision impairment. There are three individual events athletes may compete in. Short distance (5 km), middle distance (10 km), and long distance (20 km), as well as a team relay event.

The qualification of James Millar into the cross-country event marked the first time an Australian had qualified for the discipline since Peter Rickards in the 1980 Winter Paralympics. Millar competed in all three individual cross-country events.

Results

Men

Athlete	Event	Real Time	Factor	Calculated Time	Rank
James Millar	Men's 5 km Standing	14:38.6	97	14:12.2	22
James Millar	Men's 10 km Standing	37:54.4	92	34:52.5	24
James Millar	Men's 20 km Standing	1:19:11.6	92	1:12:51.5	24

=== Biathlon ===
The Biathlon event is open to those competitors with a physical impairment, or blindness/vision impairment. Competitors race around a 2 km or 2.5 km circuit for a total of either 7.5 km or 12.5 km, which are the two event distances for the men's competition (women's is 7.5 km and 10 km). Between each lap, competitors must shoot at a target located 10m away with a rifle 5 times before moving on. Each miss results in a time penalty. Blind athletes must use an electronical rifle which allows aiming by hearing. The closer the rifle is pointed to the target, the louder the higher the tone of the sound is.

James Millar was Australia's only competitor in the Biathlon event, and he competed in the 7.5 km and 12.5 km standing classification events.

Results

Men

Athlete	Event	Real Time	Missed Shots	Factor	Finish Time	Rank
James Millar	Men's 7.5 km Standing	27:18.9	3	97	26:29.8	18
James Millar	Men's 12.5 km Standing	45:04.9	10	97	53:43.7	20

== Administration ==
Australia's support team for the games was consisted of:

- Chef de mission and Paralympic Committee CEO: Darren Peters
- Assistant Chef de mission: Nick Dean
- Administration officer: Natalie Jenkins
- Attaché: Angus Mckenzie
- Press Attaché: Margie McDonald
- Coaches: Steve Graham (Head Coach), Andrew Bor (Coach)
- Technical Officer: Alan Dean
- Medical: Fiona Peat (Medical Officer), Alison Daniel (Trainer)

Also accompanying the team was a Joint Management Committee, which was made up of:

- Chair: Steve Gibb
- Member: Ron Finneran

== Funding and sponsorship ==
The Australian Paralympic Committee set a budget of $740,000 for the 2006 Winter Paralympics. The total cost to send the team and support staff came to $656,000.

The official partners for the Australian team were Disabled WinterSport Australia (DWA), who identified and developed the Australian athletes over the Paralympiad leading up to the games, and the Australian Institute of Sport (AIS), who provided the resources, as well as technical and sports advice to enable the team to travel and compete.

The 2006 Australian Winter Paralympic team was sponsored by the following organisations and companies: Major sponsors: The Australian Sports Commission, Telstra, Toyota. Official sponsors/supporters: Healthe, Motor Accidents Authority, Queensland Government, NSW sports and recreation, Workcover NSW, South Australia office of sport and recreation. Suppliers: Clayton Utz, Media Monitors.

== Closing Ceremony and post games legacy ==
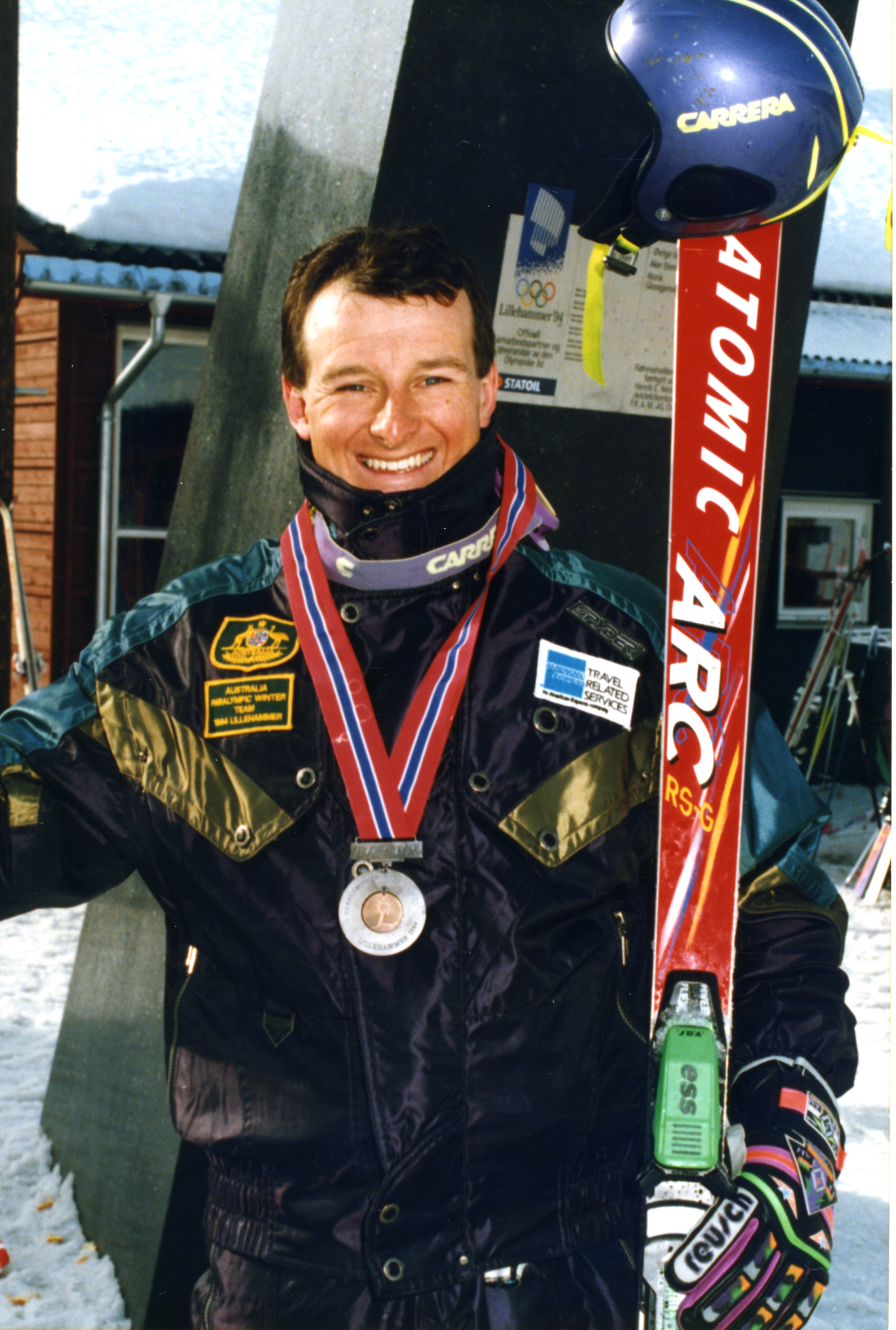
With a silver medal in his final Winter Paralympics, Michael Milton retired from Olympic competition as Australia's most successful Winter Paralympian.

Australia met its overall goal at these Winter Paralympics, winning 2 medals.

Michael Milton was originally chosen to carry the flag at the closing ceremony, but following the bronze medal winning performance of Toby Kane, he sought and gained permission to transfer the honour to Kane.

On the last day of competition, Milton, along with Scott Adams announced their retirements from Paralympic competition. Milton's career spanned 5 Winter Paralympics, and he finished as Australia's most successful winter Paralympian ever, with 6 Gold, 3 Silver, and 2 Bronze medals. In 2014, Milton returned to the Australian Winter Paralympic Team as a ski coach for the Sochi games.

== See also ==
- Australia at the Winter Paralympics
- 2006 Winter Paralympics
- Australia at the 2006 Winter Olympics
