= Australia at the 1976 Winter Paralympics =

- IPC code: AUS
- NPC: Australian Paralympic Committee
- Website: www.paralympic.org.au

in Örnsköldsvik
- Competitors: 1 (unofficial)
- Medals Ranked n/ath: Gold 0 Silver 0 Bronze 0 Total 0

Winter Paralympics appearances (overview)
- 1976; 1980; 1984; 1988; 1992; 1994; 1998; 2002; 2006; 2010; 2014; 2018; 2022; 2026

Australia was represented by one non-competing athlete at the inaugural 1976 Winter Paralympics. The games were held in Örnsköldsvik, Sweden over seven days from 21 to 28 February 1976.

Due to narrow disability requirements, Australia was unofficially represented by Ron Finneran, who was unable to compete as his disability did not meet the event classifications. However, Mr. Finneran's unwavering commitment led to the eventual formation of Disabled Winter Sport Australia (DWSA) and paved the way for Australia's successes at future Winter Paralympic Games.

== Örnsköldsvik, Sweden ==
The IPC Winter Paralympic Games history book states that the first, unofficial idea for the Winter Paralympics arose in 1974 during a pause of the annual general meeting of the International Sports Organisation for the Disabled (ISOD). ISOD Vice President of the time, Bengt Nirije, suggested that the Swedish delegation put forward a bid for the games. The Swedish obliged and the bid was gratefully accepted by the other members of the assembly. This resulted in the Swedish Sports Organisation for the Disabled (SHIF) taking responsibility for the inaugural games and thus the Winter Paralympics was born.

Despite there being no official record as to why Sweden was encouraged to host the games, its rich history in winter sports was no doubt an influential factor. However, despite being the host country, Sweden only had 16 athletes compete which was the sixth largest delegation.

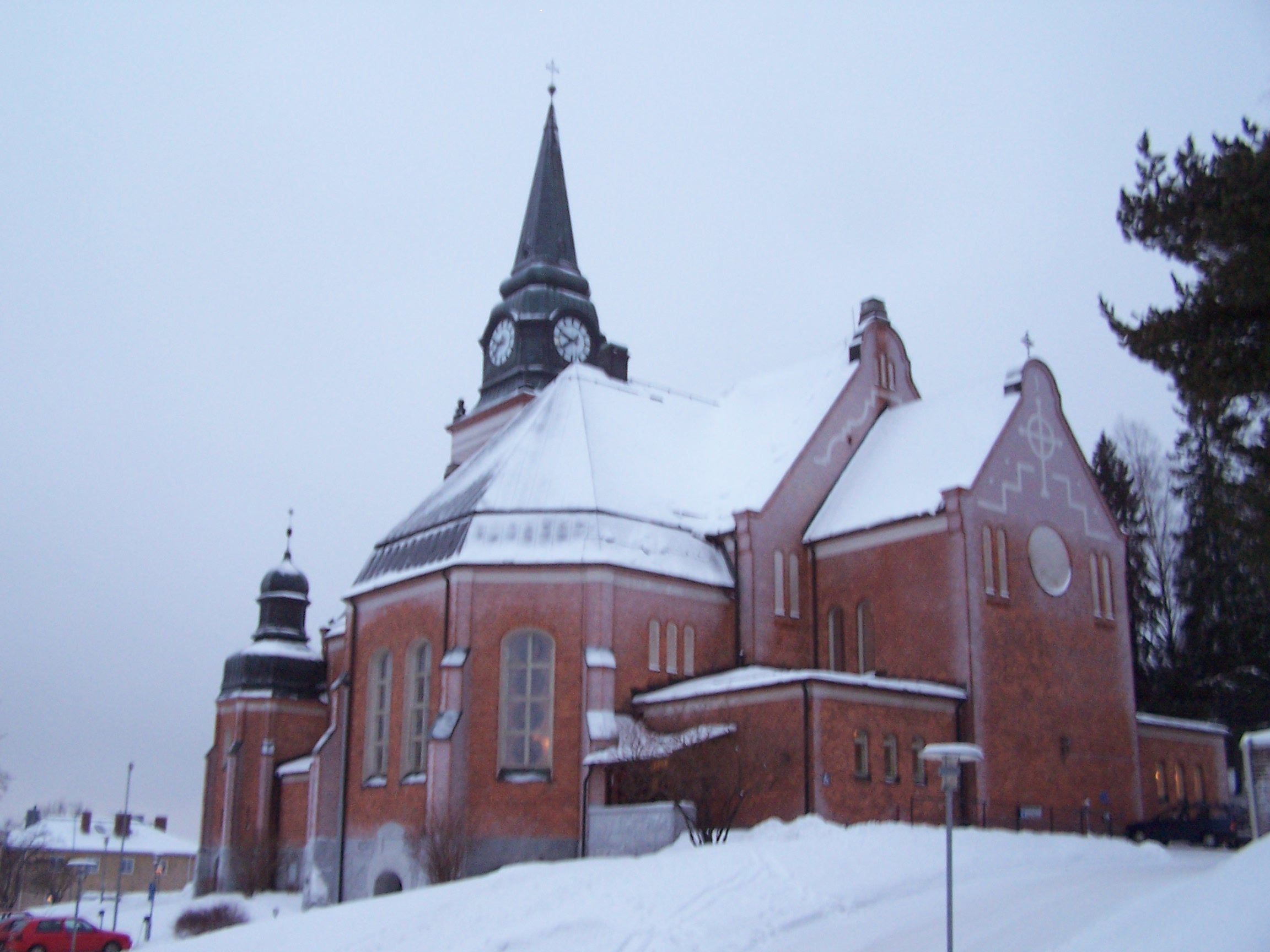
Ornskoldsvik - The host city

== Participating nations ==
The following nations took part in the 1976 Winter Paralympics.

Austria (24 athletes)	Great Britain (6)	Switzerland (15)	Finland (26)
Belgium (5)	Japan (1)	Uganda (1)	Sweden (16)
Canada (6)	Norway (23)	United States (1)	West Germany (32)
Czechoslovakia (5)	Poland (7)	Yugoslavia (9)	France (21)

The games were unsurprisingly dominated by European nations as they historically had a much larger exposure to winter sport recreationally and competitively at the Winter Olympics.

Of the 16 competing nations, Australia is absent. Despite having been at the games, Australia's Ron Finneran was disqualified as he failed to meet the disability requirements, as the Winter Paralympics at the time only allowed amputees, blind and vision impaired athletes. Finneran who had limb impairments due to childhood polio was excluded, as a result, Australia never officially competed at the 1976 Winter Paralympics. Although Finneran did carry the flag for Australia at the Opening Ceremony.

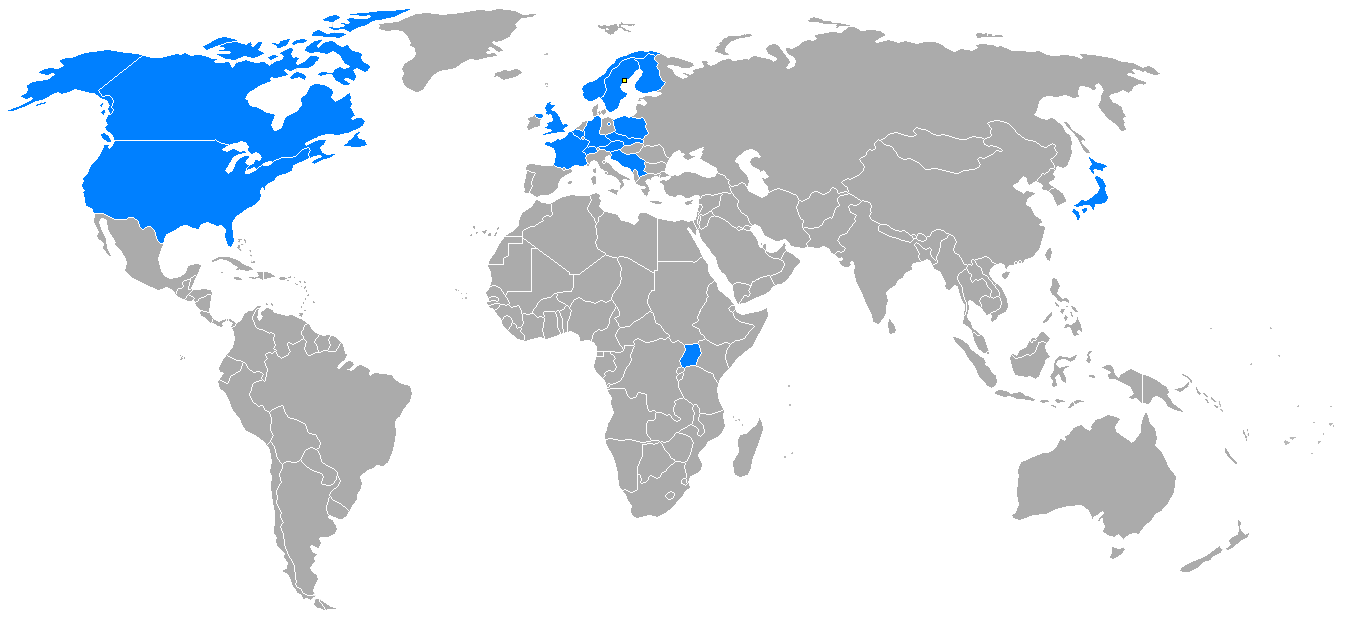
Info-graphic displaying the nations that officially competed at the 1976 Winter Paralympics.

== Logo ==
The literal translation of the word Ornskoldsvik is "eagle shields bay". Fittingly, the logo for the Ornskoldvik Paralympics consists of a large eagle carrying a shield over a body of water. Below, and on either side, is an alpine skier and a cross-country skier - the two sports featured in the games.

== Opening ceremony ==
There is very little documentation regarding the opening and closing ceremonies of the 1976 Winter Paralympics in Örnsköldsvik aside from the fact that they were relatively small/simple by today's standards.

The opening ceremony was held on Saturday 21 February in Kempehallen, Sweden in front of an estimated 1500 spectators. Regional Governor of the County of West Norrland, Bertil Löfberg, had the honour of declaring the world's first Winter Olympic Games for the Disabled open.

It is reported that 16 nations were represented in the ceremony and Australia's sole athlete, Ron Finneran had the privilege of wearing his nations flag.

== Ron Finneran ==
In 1976, Australian disabled skier Ron Finneran became aware of the Winter Paralympics being held in Ornskoldsvik, Sweden. At the time, there was no governing body in Australia to organise qualifying events. Instead, Mr. Finneran took it upon himself to seek out the only other two Australian skiers with a disability and asked whether they would be willing to take part in a "ski off" in order to qualify. Both of them declined the invitation due to family and work reasons, and thus Ron Finneran became the sole athlete representing Australia at the 1976 Winter Paralympics.

Mr. Finneran left for Sweden six weeks before the beginning of the games, after receiving some funding from the Cabramatta Rotary Club. However, his Paralympic endeavor was largely at his own expense. Upon his arrival in Ornskoldsvik he was offered accommodation in a spare room at the local cinema by the games organizing committee. In order to pay for this accommodation, he spent his days washing dishes at a local restaurant and trained at night on a slalom course with locals.

The 1976 Winter Paralympics had strict disability classifications, allowing only the blind and amputees to compete. This was unfortunate for Finneran who suffered limited mobility in his legs and arms due to polio that he contracted as an infant. Understandably, he was frustrated at being unable to compete which led to a heated argument with Dr Ludwig Guttman, the founder of the Paralympic movement. Despite being unable to compete, he had the honor of carrying the Australian flag at the opening ceremony and was given the role of ensuring course quality and safety.

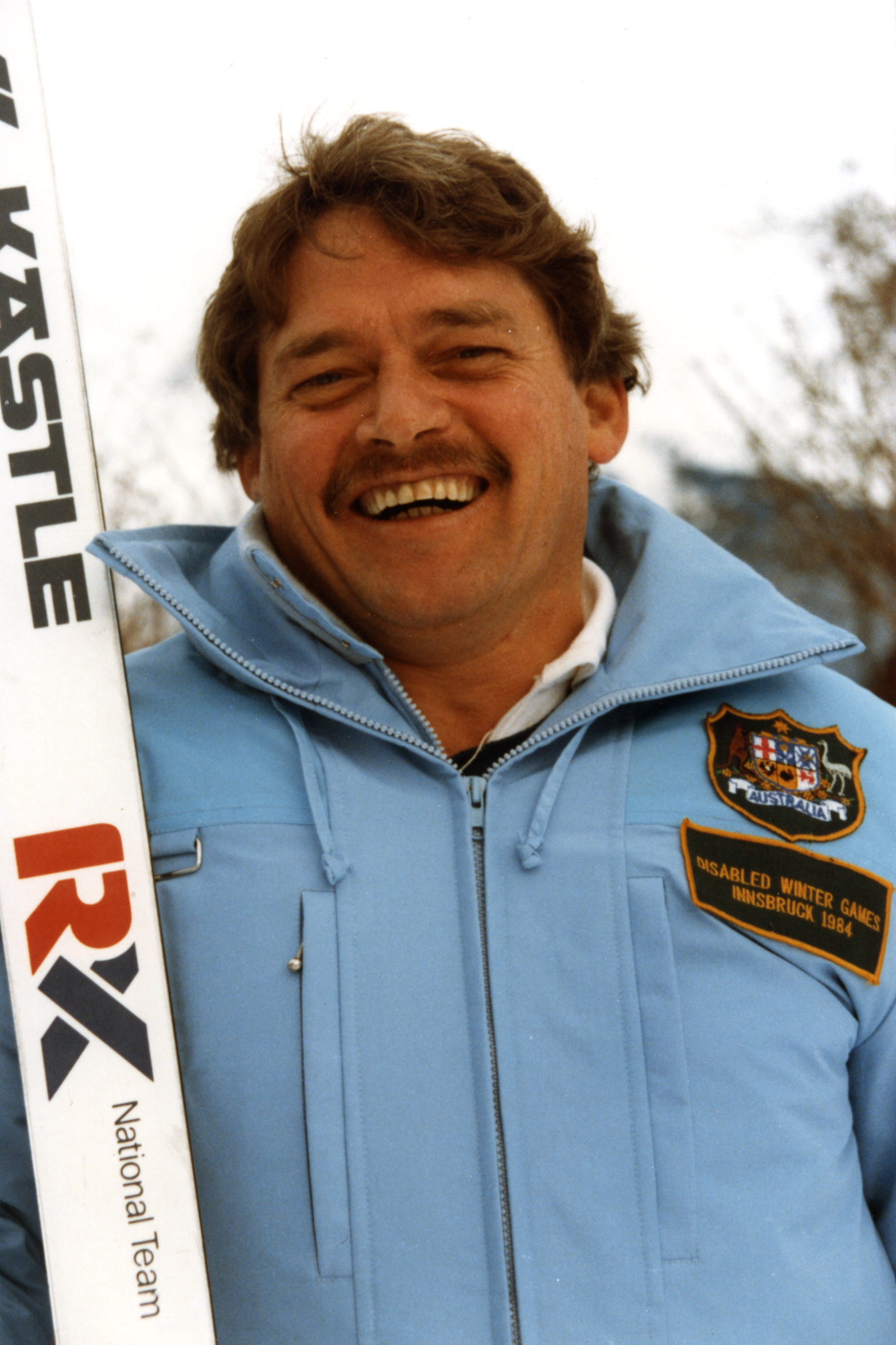
Ron Finneran at the 1988 Winter Paralympics in Innsbruck, Austria

== Disability classifications ==
The 1976 Winter Paralympics only permitted athletes to compete if they fell under one or both of the two disability classifications:

- Blindness
- Amputees

Because of this, the Winter Paralympic Games in Örnsköldsvik didn't permit athletes with spinal injuries to compete and therefore could not technically be referred to as 'Paralympic Games' in the literal sense. The International Sport Federation, more fittingly, chose to call the 1976 games the 'Winter Olympics for the Disabled'.

Unfortunately for Australia, these classifications meant that Ron Finneran was ineligible. Ron lost the use of both of his legs and his right arm after contracting polio when he was only 20-months of age. Despite obviously being a disabled athlete, Mr. Finneran was neither blind nor an amputee and was therefore unable to compete at the 1976 Winter Paralympics.

== Events ==
The 1976 Winter Paralympics featured only two competitive sports:

- Alpine skiing
- Cross-country skiing

These two sports were competed in by 198 athletes across a total of 53 medal events.

Due to the limited number of athletes, events often had very few competitors and in some cases gold medals were won by default (i.e. only one athlete competing in the event). Because of these unusual circumstances, it is very difficult to measure the level of performance of many medalists in Örnsköldsvik due to a lack of other athletes in their respective event.

The games also featured a non-medal demonstration in ice sledge racing.

Unsurprisingly, the medal tables were dominated by European nations that had a rich history in skiing at the Winter Olympic Games. Australia was omitted from the record books due to Ron Finneran being unable to compete. Had Mr. Finneran fit the disability classifications, he would have competed in alpine skiing and perhaps pushed for a spot on the podium. In fact, he remained in Sweden for two-years after the 1976 games in order to study and set up an alpine ski program for the disabled.

=== Alpine skiing ===
Medal Tally
Rank	Nation	Gold medal	Silver medal	Bronze medal	Total
1	Switzerland (SUI)	9	1	0	10
2	West Germany (FRG)	8	7	2	17
3	Austria (AUT)	5	16	13	34
4	Czechoslovakia (TCH)	3	0	0	3
5	France (FRA)	2	0	3	5
6	Canada (CAN)	1	0	2	3
Total		28	24	20	72

The competition events were:

- Giant slalom: men – women
- Slalom: men – women
- Alpine combination: men – women

Each event had separate standing classifications:

- I - standing, single leg amputation above the knee
- II - standing, single leg amputation below the knee
- III - standing, single arm amputation
- IV A - standing, double leg amputation below the knee, mild cerebral palsy, or equivalent impairment
- IV B - standing, double arm amputation

=== Cross-country skiing ===
Medal Tally
Rank	Nation	Gold medal	Silver medal	Bronze medal	Total
1	Finland (FIN)	8	7	7	22
2	Norway (NOR)	7	3	2	12
3	Sweden (SWE)	6	7	7	20
4	West Germany (FRG)	2	5	4	11
5	Switzerland (SUI)	1	0	1	2
6	Canada (CAN)	1	0	0	1
7	Austria (AUT)	0	0	1	1
Total		25	22	22	69

The competition events were:

- 5 km: men – women
- 10 km: men – women
- 15 km: men
- 3x5 km relay: men – women
- 3x10 km relay: men

Each event had separate standing, or visually impaired classifications:

- I - standing, single leg amputation above the knee
- II - standing, single leg amputation below the knee
- III - standing, single arm amputation
- IV B - standing, double arm amputation
- A - visually impaired, no functional vision
- B - visually impaired, under 10% functional vision

== Closing ceremony ==
Much like with the opening ceremony, very little is known about the closing ceremony in Ornskoldsvik. It is known that the ceremony featured an appearance by the King of Sweden, Carl Gustak XVI. The king was accompanied by Bertil Löfberg, the Regional Governor of West Norrland that opened the games. The king visited several sites around Ornskoldsvik before officially declaring the games as over. Due to his appearance, the closing ceremony was attended by 4000 spectators which was a huge increase from the 1500 that were present at the opening ceremony.

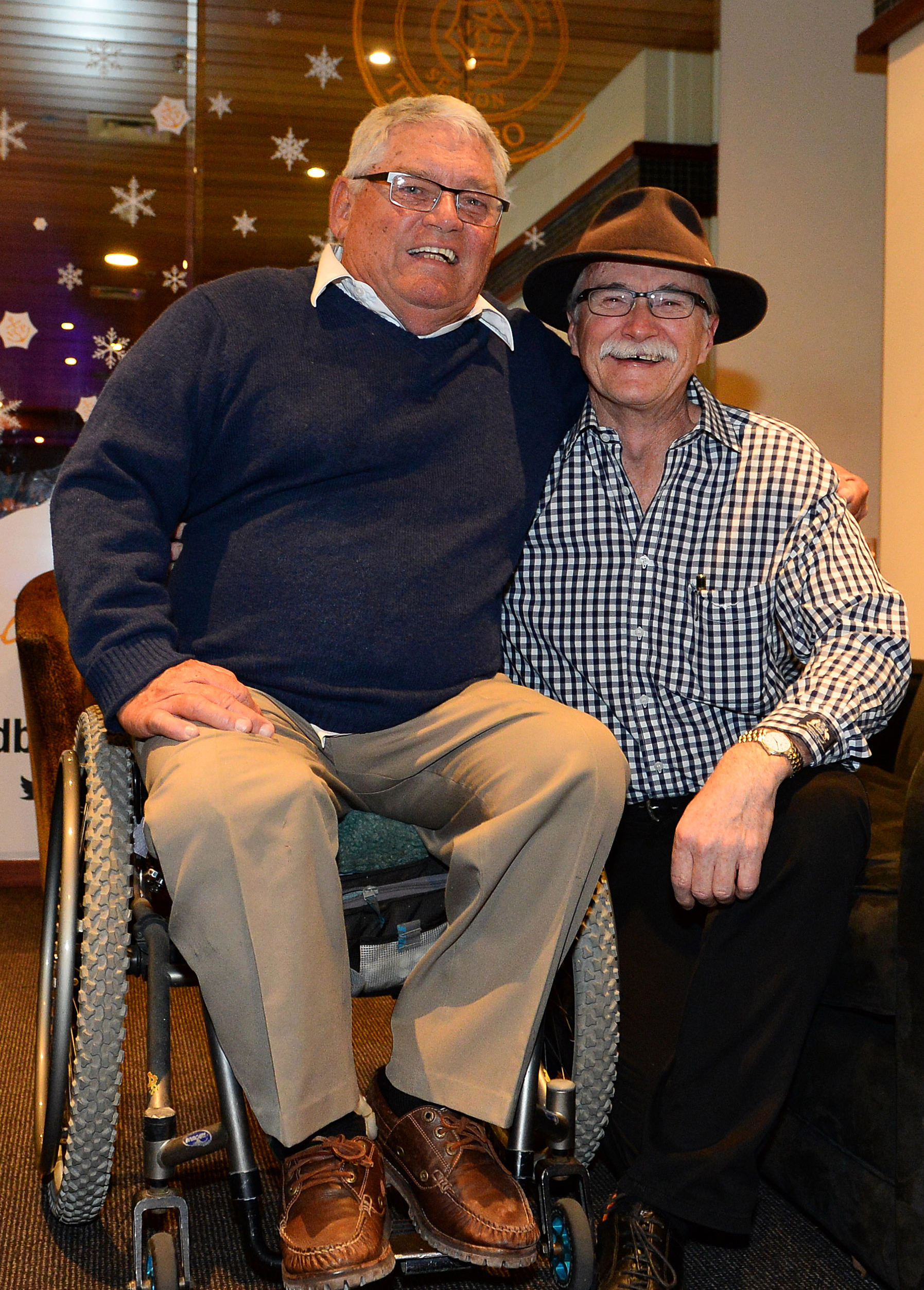
Two of the founders of Disabled Wintersport Australia, Ron Finneran (L) and Nick Dean (R) at a function on 3 September 2013 in Thredbo during the first IPC alpine skiing world cup event to be held in Australia, conducted by the Australian Paralympic Committee

== Administration ==
In 1976, there was no organisation to represent disabled Australian athletes in winter sports. Because of this, Australia was void of any official representative body or administration at the 1976 Winter Paralympics in Örnsköldsvik. However, Ron Finneran's unofficial attendance at the games eventually led to the formation of the Australian Winter Sports Society (as it was then known).

== Australia post 1976 Winter Paralympics ==
At the conclusion of the 1976 Winter Paralympics, Ron Finneran was offered a scholarship to live and study at a local university in Örnsköldsvik. He remained there until 1978 where he was involved in developing an alpine ski program for the disabled.

In 1978 Ron returned to Australia filled with determination to rectify for future Australian disabled athletes the issues that he had at the 1976 games. He accepted a position as a ski instructor at the Thredbo Ski School where he met fellow ski instructor, Bruce Abel, with whom he co-founded the Disabled Skiing Federation - now known as Disabled Winter Sport Australia (DWSA). Due largely to Ron's commitment to raising awareness of disabled skiing in Australia, DWSA has helped thousands of disabled athletes compete in winter sports, many of whom have reached the Winter Paralympics.

"It's been so amazing to see how disabled winter sports have grown over the years and I'm really proud of how much we've achieved," Ron said.

Through DWSA and Ron's work in talent recognition, and personal support for skiers, Australia is now the fifth ranked nation in the world in Alpine skiing, with two DWSA members holding current world records.

== See also ==
- Australia at the Paralympics
