= Paralympics Australia awards =

Paralympics Australia recognises the achievements of Paralympic athletes, coaches and administrators through several awards. These awards generally relate to performances at the Summer and Winter Paralympic Games and are not necessarily awarded annually.

== Australian Paralympian of the Year ==
Year	Athlete
1994	Louise Sauvage (Athletics)
1995	Priya Cooper (Swimming)
1996	Louise Sauvage (Athletics)
1997	Louise Sauvage (Athletics)
1998	Louise Sauvage (Athletics)
2000	Siobhan Paton (Swimming)
2002	Michael Milton (Alpine skiing)
2004	Tim Sullivan (Athletics)
2008	Matthew Cowdrey (Swimming)
2010	Cameron Rahles-Rahbula (Alpine skiing)
2012	Jacqueline Freney (Swimming)
2016	Dylan Alcott (Wheelchair tennis)
2020	Madison de Rozario (Athletics)
2022	Ben Tudhope (Snowboarding)
2024	Lauren Parker (Triathlon / Cycling)
2026	Ben Tudhope (Snowboarding)

== Male Athlete of the Year ==
Year	Athlete
2008	Matthew Cowdrey (Swimming)
2010	Cameron Rahles-Rahbula (Alpine skiing)
2012	Evan O'Hanlon (Athletics)
2016	Dylan Alcott (Wheelchair tennis)
2020	Curtis McGrath (Canoeing)
2022	Ben Tudhope (Snowboarding)
2024	James Turner (Athletics)
2026	Ben Tudhope (Snowboarding)

== Female Athlete of the Year ==
Year	Athlete
2008	Lisa McIntosh (Athletics)
2010	Jessica Gallagher (Alpine skiing)
2012	Jacqueline Freney (Swimming)
2016	Maddison Elliott (Swimming)
2020	Madison de Rozario (Athletics)
2022	Melissa Perrine (Alpine skiing)
2024	Lauren Parker (Cycling / Triathlon)
2026	Lauren Parker (Biathlon/ Cross country skiing)

== Rookie Athlete of the Year ==
Year	Athlete
2008	Peter Leek (Swimming)
2012	Maddison Elliott (Swimming); Rheed McCracken (Athletics)
2016	James Turner (Athletics)
2020	William Martin (Swimming)
2022	Josh Hanlon (Alpine skiing)
2024	Alexa Leary (Swimming)
2026	Aaron McCarthy (Snowboarding)

Award changed from Junior to Rookie Athlete of the Year in 2016.

== Coach of the Year ==
Year	Coach
2008	Iryna Dvoskina (Athletics)
2010	Steve Graham (Alpine skiing)
2012	Peter Day (Cycling)
2016	Iryna Dvoskina (Athletics)
2020	Louise Sauvage (Athletics)
2022	Par Sundqvist (Snowboarding)
2004	Maggie Meng (Table tennis)
2026	Nickie Rodger (Snowboarding)

== Team of the Year ==
Year	Team
2008	Men's Wheelchair Basketball (Rollers)
2012	Wheelchair Rugby Team (Steelers); Sailing SKUD18 Crew Daniel Fitzgibbon & Liesl Tesch
2016	Australian Paralympic Sailing Team; Matthew Bugg (Single person 2.4mR), Daniel Fitzgibbon and Liesl Tesch (Two person Skud 18), Colin Harrison, Russell Boaden, Jonathan Harris (Three person Sonar)
2020	Women’s Table Tennis (Class 9-10) Team; Melissa Tapper, Qian Yang, Lina Lei
2024	Nikki Ayers & Jed Altschwager (PR3 Mixed Double Scull, Para-rowing)

== Uncle Kevin Coombs Medal for the Spirit of the Games ==
Named after indigenous wheelchair basketballer Kevin Coombs. The Medal is awarded to the athlete that embodies the 'spirit of the Games'.

Year	Team
2016	Liesl Tesch (Sailing)
2020	Stuart Jones (Cyclist)
2024	Grant Patterson (Swimming)
2026	Matt Brumby (Biathlon / Cross country sking)

== President’s Award for Excellence in Sportsmanship ==
Year	Athlete
2008	Kurt Fearnley (Athletics)
2010	Toby Kane (Alpine skiing)
2012	Libby Kosmala (Shooting); Kieran Modra (Cycling)
2016	Kate McLoughlin (2016 Chef de Mission)
2020	Daniela Di Toro
2024	Boccia Australia High Performance program

== Paralympic Achievement Award ==
Year	Athlete
2010	Individuals - David Baker, Pamela Baker, Steve Mason and Belinda Green; Corporate - 360HR
2012	Matthew Cowdrey (Swimming)

== Australian Paralympic Hall of Fame ==
It was established in 2011 to recognise individuals that have made a significant contribution to Australia's paralympic achievements and to enhance the profile of Paralympians in the Australian community.

Year	Name
2011	Louise Sauvage(Athlete)
2011	Frank Ponta (Athlete)
2011	Sir George Bedbrook (Administrator)
2016	Kevin Coombs (Athlete)
2016	Tracey Freeman (Athlete)
2016	David Hall (Athlete)
2016	Daphne Hilton (Athlete)
2016	Ron Finneran (Administrator)
2016	Adrienne Smith (Administrator)
2022	Libby Kosmala (Athlete)
2022	Priya Cooper (Athlete)
2022	Michael Milton (Athlete)
2022	Matthew Cowdrey (Athlete)
2022	Kurt Fearnley (Athlete)
2024	Elizabeth Edmondson (Swimming)
2024	Anne Brunell (Swimming)
2024	David Gould (Basketball)
2024	Gary Hooper
2024	Greg Hartung (Administrator)
2026	Bart Bunting (Skiing)
2026	Christopher Scott (Cycling)
2026	Nick Dean (Administrator)

== Australian Paralympic Medal ==
This award recognises significant long term contribution to Paralympic sport in Australia and is the highest honour for a non-athlete.

Year	Name
2001	Marie Little
2002	Ron Finneran
2004	Adrienne Smith
2005	Nick Dean
2008	Scott Goodman
2010	Paul Bird
2010	Ken Brown
2010	John Coates
2010	Doug Denby
2010	Rod Kemp
2022	John Wylie
2024	Tim Matthews

== See also ==
- Australia at the Paralympics
- Australia at the Summer Paralympics
- Australia at the Winter Paralympics
