= Australia at the 2010 Winter Paralympics =

- IPC code: AUS
- NPC: Australian Paralympic Committee
- Website: www.paralympic.org.au

in Vancouver
- Competitors: 11 in 2 sports
- Flag bearer: Toby Kane (Opening) Cameron Rahles-Rahbula (Closing)
- Officials: 15
- Medals Ranked 16th: Gold 0 Silver 1 Bronze 3 Total 4

Winter Paralympics appearances (overview)
- 1976; 1980; 1984; 1988; 1992; 1994; 1998; 2002; 2006; 2010; 2014; 2018; 2022; 2026

At the 2010 Winter Paralympics in Vancouver, British Columbia, Canada, Australia sent 11 athletes to compete against the other participating 42 nations. The delegation consisted of 3 sighted guides and 17 support staff. This was the largest delegation Australia had sent to a Winter Paralympics. Australia has participated in every winter Paralympics since its conception.

In 2010, Dominic Monypenny became the fourth Australian athlete to participate in both the Summer and Winter Paralympic Games, the others being Kyrra Grunnsund, Anthony Bonaccurso, and Michael Milton. In the lead-up to the 2010 winter Games, nine of the 11 Australian athletes had recorded top 10 finishes in Paralympic, world cup or world championship competitions in their class.

Due to the number of competitors (502 in total), the 2010 Winter Paralympics marked the largest of its kind, following the Torino 2006 Winter Olympics in which only 39 countries took part. Of the participating nations, 2010 was the first winter paralympics for Argentina, Bosnia & Herzegovina, Romania, Russian Federation, and Serbia.

== Disability classification ==
Every participant at the Paralympics has their disability grouped into one of five disability categories; amputation, the condition may be congenital or sustained through injury or illness; cerebral palsy; wheelchair athletes, there is often overlap between this and other categories; visual impairment, including blindness; and les autres, any physical disability that does not fall strictly under one of the other categories, for example dwarfism or multiple sclerosis. Each Paralympic sport then has its own classifications, dependent upon the specific physical demands of competition. Events are given a code, made of numbers and letters, describing the type of event and classification of the athletes competing. Events with "B" in the code are for athletes with visual impairment, codes LW1 to LW9 are for athletes who stand to compete and LW10 to LW12 are for athletes who compete sitting down. For the 2010 Paralympics alpine skiing events grouped athletes into sitting, standing and visually impaired categories. The same three classifications are also used to group competitors in cross-country skiing.

=== Athlete classifications ===
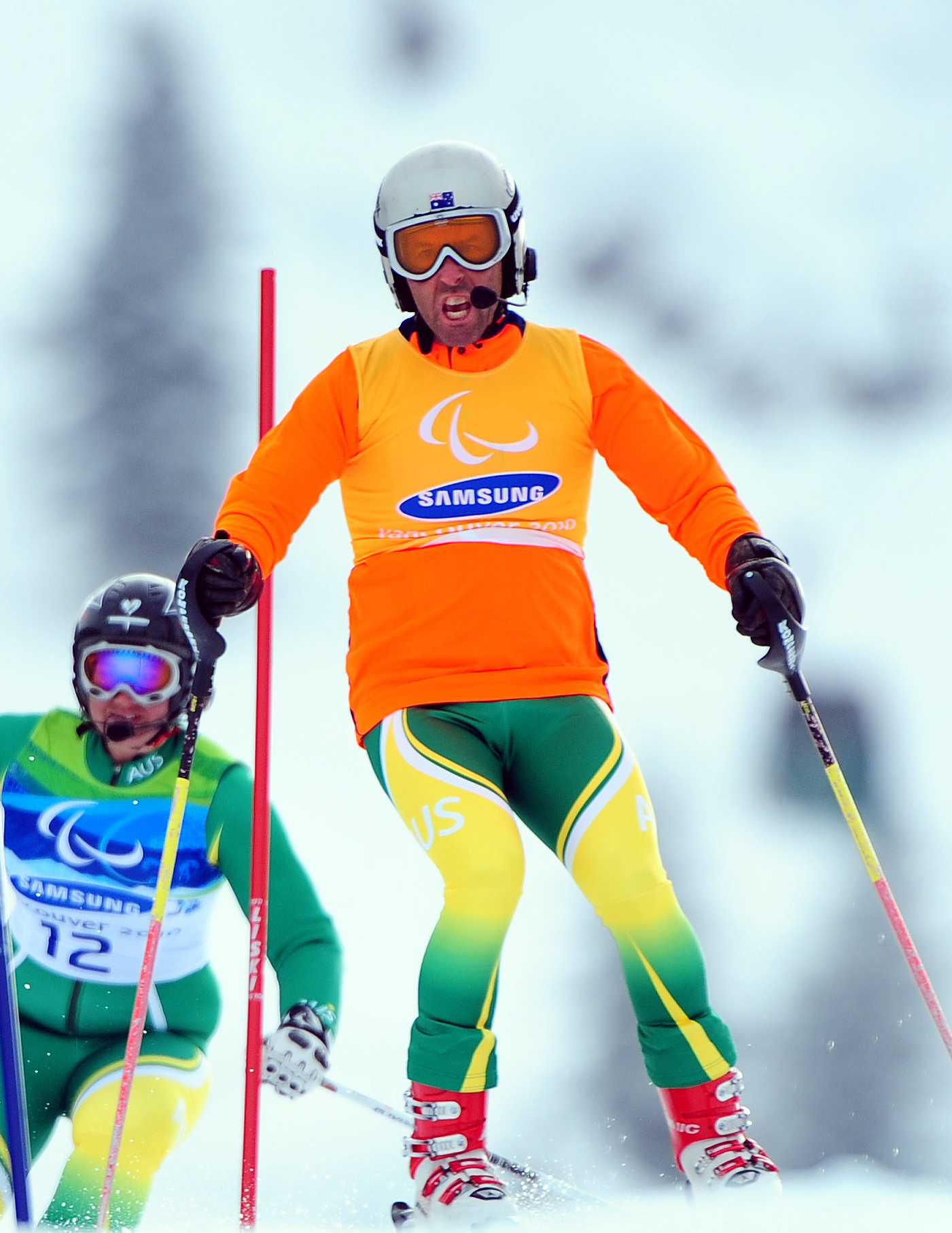
Andrew Bor (guide) and Melissa Perrine, 2010 Australian Paralympic Team Athlete, at the Vancouver Paralympic Winter Games.

Of the 11 competitors that competed at the 2010 Paralympics, classifications varied:

Athlete	Classification	Congenital or Acquired
Melissa Perrine Andrew Bor (Guide)	B2	Congenital
Jessica Gallagher Eric Bickerton (Guide)	B3	Congenital
Bart Bunting	B1	Congenital
Shannon Dallas	LW11 (Sitting Class)	Acquired (workplace accident)
Mitchell Gourley	LW6/8 (Standing Class)	Congenital
Toby Kane	LW2 (Standing Class)	Acquired (Car accident)
Marty Mayberry	LW3 (Standing Class)	Acquired (Meningococcal)
James Millar	LW8 (Standing Class)	Congenital
Dominic Monypenny	LW12 (Sitting Class)	Acquired (Fall)
Cameron Rahles-Rahbula	LW2 (Standing Class)	Acquired (Cancer)
Nicholas Watts	LW2 (Standing Class)	Acquired (Cancer)

== Administration ==
Team officials were:

- Chef de Mission – Michael Hartung
- Assistant Chef de Mission – Nick Dean
- Coaches – Steve Graham (Head Coach), Matthew Lyons (Senior Coach), Michael Gould (Assistant * Coach), Daniel Weiland (Nordic Coach)
- Medical – Geoff Thompson (Team Doctor), Brett Robinson (Soft Tissue Therapist), Jason Patchell (Psychologist)
- Media – Tim Mannion (Manager), Margie McDonald (Media Liaison Officer)
- Support Staff – Caroline Walker (Games Coordinator) Alan Dean (Equipment Support), Michael Googan (Attache), Curtis Christian (Ski Technician)

== Sponsorship, fundraising and media ==
The sponsorship and fundraising program originally enabled the Australian Paralympic Committee to extend its ability to fund the Australian team. Estimated costs were believed to amount to approximately 1.25 million in 2010, $9 million in 2012 and $1.6 million in 2014) allowing for support and funding of sports programs and administration costs. The games were broadcast to the Australian public through the ABC broadcast network through daily highlight coverage through the ABC1 channel across the ten days of competition.

== Medals and Medalists ==
While Australia did not achieve medal tallies as extensive as those achieved by strong winter sport countries, the small team achieved one silver (Marty Mayberry) and three bronze (Cameron Rahles-Rahbula x2, Jessica Gallagher) medals, doubling their medal tally from Torino in 2006. Of these medalists Jessica Gallagher was the first Australian woman to win a Paralympic Winter medal. Unlike previous games, the medals did not resemble the traditional rounded shape but rather that of a square with rounded edges with a wave-like design running through the medals. No two medals were designed the same making every individual medal unique to each athlete. The design of each medal was inspired by First Nations imagery featuring the emblem of the Games along wt the IPC's logo. Written on each medal was 'Vancouver 2010 Paralympic Winter Games in French and English as well as 'Vancouver 2010' in Braille.

Rank	Nation		Gold	Silver	Bronze	Total
1	Germany	(Germany)	13	5	6	24
2	Russia	(Russia)	12	16	10	38
3	Canada	(Canada)	10	5	4	19
4	Slovakia	(Slovakia)	6	2	3	11
5	Ukraine	(Ukraine)	5	8	6	19
16	Australia	(Australia)	0	1	3	4

Medal	Name	Sport	Event	Date
Silver	Marty Mayberry	Alpine Skiing	Men's Downhill – Standing	18 March
Bronze	Jessica Gallagher; Eric Bickerton (Guide)	Alpine Skiing	Women's slalom – visually impaired	14 March
Bronze	Cameron Rahles-Rahbula	Alpine Skiing	Men's slalom – standing	15 March
Bronze	Cameron Rahles-Rahbula	Alpine Skiing	Men's super combined – standing	20 March

== Mascot ==
When presented with their medals, each Australian medalist received a small version of the games mascot Sumi meaning guardian spirit. An animal spirit who was believed to live in the mountains of British Columbia. Sumi is the shape of a bear wearing the hat of the orca whale, flies with the wings of the thunderbird and runs on the furry legs of the black bear.

The Australian team carried their own mascot throughout the games (boxing kangaroo). This mascot has a long history in Australian teams both able and disabled bodies. First used by the successful America's Cup winners, the mascot represents the "Australian fighting spirit" provides self-confidence to many of the competing athletes. Nicknamed "BK", the boxing kangaroo represents and individual is "not lout, nor is he aggressive or arrogant. He is however, assertive when it comes to defending his country's glory". This beloved mascot was commonly used by spectators to show their support for the Australian athletes at events in which Australian's competed. Flags of the mascot are also commonly hung by athletes out of their accommodation windows and over railings to demonstrate national and team pride. Use of the boxing kangaroo mascot at the 2010 winter Paralympics was shrouded in controversy due to earlier disagreement between the Australian Winter Olympic able bodied team and the International Olympic Committee when a two story high flag of the beloved mascot draped over a balcony in the athlete's village was declared to be "too commercial" by the IOC. After, widespread criticism against the IOC in regards to their decision in requesting the flag be removed, after a meeting between the IOC and Australian Olympic Committee resulted in the decision that the flag could stay.

== Logo ==
The logo of the 2010 Winter Paralympics was described as "representing the spirit of the host region, the athletes journey and the harmony that exists between the athlete, their sport and environment". The emblem of the Paralympic logo aimed to reflect "the athlete's mountainous inner strength and personal transformation as they pushed themselves to new heights in the pursuit of excellence". Through the depicted aspects of the "valley, mountain and sun of the west coast' a human form is created. The overall design is therefore aimed at being homage to the 'harmonious relationship by suggesting that the athlete and mountains are one".

== Events ==
Of the already offered events of Alpine, Ice Sledge Hockey, Biathlon, Cross Country and Wheelchair Curling, the Alpine Skiing Super Combined event was added to the Paralympic Programme. Of the events offered Australia only competed in two: Alpine skiing and Cross-country.

=== Alpine skiing ===
Women

Athlete	Event	Final			
Athlete	Event	Run 1	Run 2	Total Time	Rank
Jessica Gallagher; Eric Bickerton (Guide)	Slalom visually impaired	57.57	56.83	2:04.35	3rd place, bronze medalist(s)
Jessica Gallagher; Eric Bickerton (Guide)	Giant slalom visually impaired	1:41.24	1:43.40	3:24.64	7
Melissa Perrine; Andy Bor (Guide)	Downhill visually impaired			1:33.30	5
Melissa Perrine; Andy Bor (Guide)	Slalom visually impaired	1.09.56	1.12.92	2.22.47	8
Melissa Perrine; Andy Bor (Guide)	Giant slalom visually impaired	1:37.57	DNF		–
Melissa Perrine; Andy Bor (Guide)	Super-G visually impaired			1:46.35	7
Melissa Perrine; Andy Bor (Guide)	Super combined visually impaired	DNF	did not advance		–

Men

Athlete	Event	Final			
Athlete	Event	Run 1	Run 2	Total Time	Rank
Bart Bunting; Nathan Chivers (Guide)	Downhill visually impaired			DNF	–
Bart Bunting; Nathan Chivers (Guide)	Giant slalom visually impaired	1:28.85	DNS		–
Shannon Dallas	Downhill sitting			DNS	–
Shannon Dallas	Slalom sitting	56.86	1:00.79	1:57.65	17
Shannon Dallas	Giant slalom sitting	1:23.10	1:26.42	2:49.52	6
Shannon Dallas	Super-G sitting			1:25.21	11
Shannon Dallas	Super combined sitting	1:25.21	DNF		–
Mitchell Gourley	Slalom standing	1:00.92	58.08	1:59.00	27
Mitchell Gourley	Giant slalom standing	1:15.76	1:17.27	2:33.03	12
Mitchell Gourley	Super-G standing			1:25.38	10
Toby Kane	Downhill standing			1:25.26	10
Toby Kane	Slalom standing	56.28	54.70	1:50.98	11
Toby Kane	Giant slalom standing	1:15.50	1:15.53	2:31.03	10
Toby Kane	Super-G standing			DNF	–
Toby Kane	Super combined standing	DNF	did not advance		–
Marty Mayberry	Downhill standing			1:22.78	T (silver)
Marty Mayberry	Slalom standing	DSQ	did not advance		–
Marty Mayberry	Giant slalom standing	DNF	did not advance		–
Marty Mayberry	Super-G standing			1:30.50	24
Cameron Rahles-Rahbula	Downhill standing			1:22.88	4
Cameron Rahles-Rahbula	Slalom standing	53.08	54.61	1:47.69	3rd place, bronze medalist(s)
Cameron Rahles-Rahbula	Giant slalom standing	1:13.73	1:15.34	2:29.07	6
Cameron Rahles-Rahbula	Super-G standing			1:22.65	5
Cameron Rahles-Rahbula	Super combined standing	1:25.19	48.34	2:13.85	3rd place, bronze medalist(s)
Nicholas Watts	Slalom standing	1:10.80	DNF		–
Nicholas Watts	Giant slalom standing	1:35.29	1:48.48	3:23.77	35
Nicholas Watts	Super-G standing			1:47.84	33

=== Cross-country skiing ===
Athlete	Event	Factor %	Qualification			Semifinal		Final		
Athlete	Event	Factor %	Real Time	Result	Rank	Result	Rank	Real Time	Result	Rank
James Millar	1km sprint classic, standing			3:47.97	22	did not qualify				22
James Millar	10km classic, standing								33:12.7	22
James Millar	20km free, standing								1:02:33.5	18
Dominic Monypenny	1km sprint classic, sitting			2:27.60	26	did not qualify				26
Dominic Monypenny	10km classic, sitting								30:26.7	22
Dominic Monypenny	15km free, sitting								44:55.7	17

== See also ==
- Australia at the 2010 Winter Olympics
- Australia at the Winter Paralympics
- 2010 Winter Paralympics
