= Emily Rahles-Rahbula =

Australian para-alpine skier

Emily Jansen
Personal information
- Nationality: Australia
- Born: 19 December 1977 (age 48) Geelong, Victoria, Australia

Sport
- Country: Australia
- Sport: Para-alpine skiing

Achievements and titles
- Paralympic finals: 2006 Winter Paralympics

Emily Rahles-Rahbula (née Jansen; born 19 December 1977) is an Australian Para-alpine amputee skier. She competed at the 2006 Winter Paralympics in Turin, Italy, and became Australia's first female Winter Paralympian.

== Personal ==
Emily Jansen was born on 19 December 1977 in Geelong, Victoria, Australia. Jansen was diagnosed with osteosarcoma, a rare form of bone cancer in her second year of university in 1997, which resulted in the loss of her right leg above the knee. She has a Chemical Engineering/Science degree from University of Melbourne and has been employed as a chemical engineer.

She married Australian para alpine skier Cameron Rahles-Rahbula on 4 December 2010. They have two sons, named Archie and Finn.

== Skiing ==
After her amputation, Jansen took up wheelchair basketball and skiing. Jansen was spotted skiing with her family in Mount Buller, Victoria and invited to attend a talent identification camp before joining the Australian Winter Paralympic squad in 2004. She competed as a single above the knee amputee (LW2). in 2005, Jansen competed for Australia for the first time and won two bronze medals in the giant slalom and super giant slalom in the NorthAm and Europa Cup seasons.

She became Australia's first female to compete at the Winter Paralympics after being selected on the 2006 Australian Winter Paralympic Team at Turin, Italy. At Torino, she completed in two events - Women's Giant Slalom Standing (21st) and Women's Slalom Standing (did not finish).
