= Australia at the 1984 Winter Paralympics =

- IPC code: AUS
- NPC: Australian Paralympic Committee
- Website: www.paralympic.org.au

in Innsbruck
- Competitors: 3 in 2 sports
- Medals Ranked 15th: Gold 0 Silver 0 Bronze 0 Total 0

Winter Paralympics appearances (overview)
- 1976; 1980; 1984; 1988; 1992; 1994; 1998; 2002; 2006; 2010; 2014; 2018; 2022; 2026

The 1984 Winter Paralympics, then known as The Third World Winter Games for the Disabled, were held in Innsbruck, Austria. The games took place from the 15 until 21 January. Present at these games were 419 athletes from 21 countries, Spain and the Netherlands competing for the first time in the Winter Paralympics, competing in 107 events across 3 sports. The inclusion of Les Austres and Cerebral palsy impairment groups contributing to the distinct increase in athlete participation with the total number of athletes jumping from 229 at Geilo, Norway in 1980.

These games were unique as they were the first games organised by the International Co-ordinating Committee, which was formed shortly before on 15 March 1982 in Leysin, Switzerland. This committee was formed to incorporate the disability sport movement with the Olympic movement and led to future collaboration between the two.

The Austrian organizers were praised for their effort especially considering there was a severe lack of snow in Innsbruck at the time of the Games. In innovative fashion the organizers rallied the assistance of the Austrian Army to move snow to the tracks from neighboring glaciers.

== Logo ==
The logo for the 1984 Winter Paralympic was representative of the beginning of a much closer working relationship between the International Organizing Committee (IOC) and the disability sport movement, when the IOC executive board meeting of 1982 agreed to permit the logo to incorporate the Olympic Rings. This did however come at a cost, as this incorporation of the rings was only permitted in exchange for the term 'Olympic' being dropped from the name of the games (then known as the 3rd Winter Olympic Games for the Disabled). The 3rd Winter Olympic Games for the Disabled was the preferred choice for the disability movement at the time; however, they deemed a positive relationship with the IOC to be more valuable.

The three parts of the logo work together to collaboratively represent Innsbruck, the Olympic movement and the disability sport movement:

- Innsbruck - through the depiction of the Goldenes Dachl, a famous Innsbruck landmark
- The Olympic movement - through the Olympic ring and
- The disability sport movement - through the 5 broken rings at the bottom of the poster.

== Opening and closing ceremonies ==
The opening ceremony, held on 14 January 1984, was another symbol of the growing relationship between the IOC and the disability sport movement. During negotiations over the use of the word 'Olympic' in the title of the games, it was also agreed upon that IOC president Juan Antonio Samaranch would attend the games and whilst the Olympic flag was being raised, made an address.

The games were opened officially by the president of Austria, Dr Rudolph Kirchschläger, and both the opening and closing ceremonies (held on 20 January 1984) took place in the Innsbruck Olympic Ice Stadium.

== Athletes ==
The Australian contingent was made up of three male skiers, Kyrra Grunnsund, Andrew Temple and Rodney Mill and a guide Peter Smythe (guide for Mill). Ron Finneran acting as Chef de Mission and coach James Milner.

=== Ron Finneran ===
Ron Finneran, who contracted polio aged 18 months, resulting in spina bifida, was a pioneer of winter Paralympic sports in Australia, introducing disabled skiing to Australia in 1974 after he learnt in US and Canada. He continued to support the athletes as Chef de Mission at five games after his days of competing and was a passionate advocate for winter disability sport in Australia. In role as chef de mission, Finneran was responsible for be the communication between the competing team and the organisational hierarchy.

=== Kyrra Grunnsund ===
Grunnsund (OAM - Medal of the Order of Australia 1995) is a below-the-knee amputee (LW4) who was the first athlete to represent Australia at both the Summer and Winter Paralympics.

At the 1984 Winter Paralympics Grunnsund competed Alpine slalom, giant slalom and downhill events, specifically the Men's Alpine Combination LW4, Men's Downhill LW4, Men's Giant Slalom LW4 and Men's Slalom LW4. Although not winning any medals, Grunnsund put in an impressive performance, placing 5th in his Alpine event and 6th in the Giant Slalom.

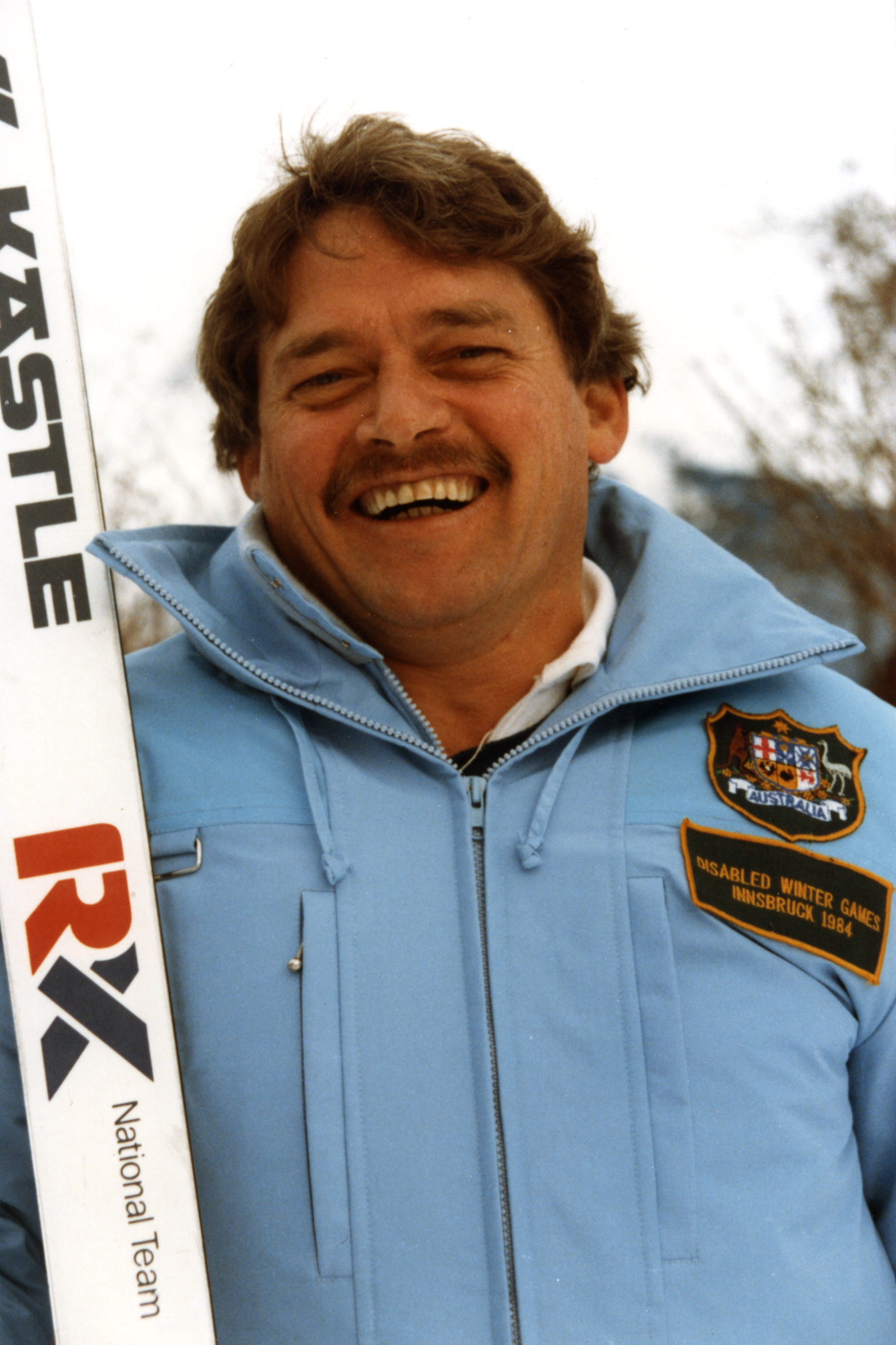
Australian Ron Finneran, Chef de Mission at the 1984 Winter Paralympics

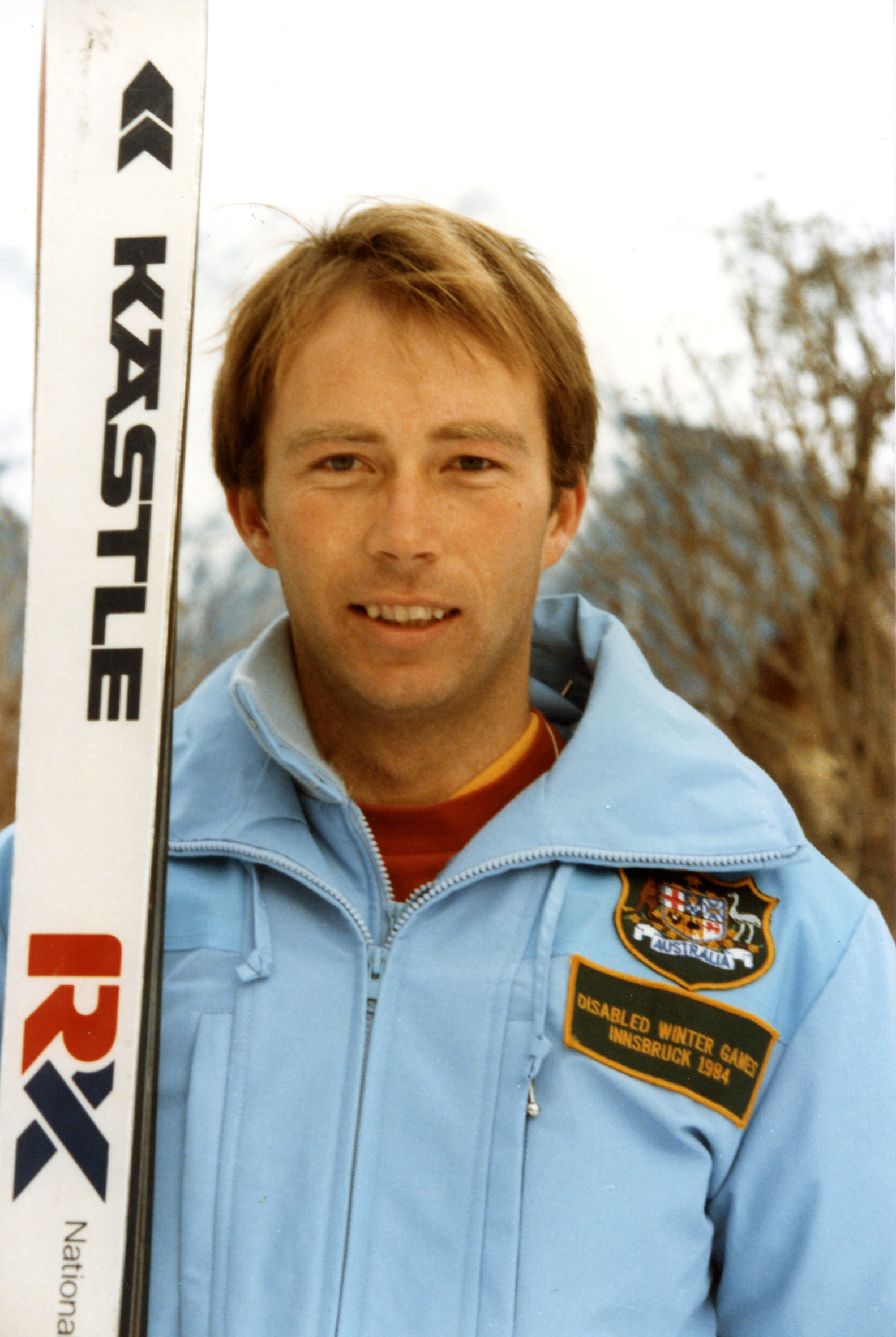
Australian Paralympian Kyrra Grunnsund at the 1984 Winter Games

=== Andrew Temple ===
Andrew Temple is a single-leg amputee who represented Australia at the 1984 Winter Paralympics.

At the 1984 Winter Paralympics Temple competed in giant slalom and downhill events, specifically the Men's Downhill LW2, Men's, Men's Giant Slalom LW2 and Men's Slalom LW2.

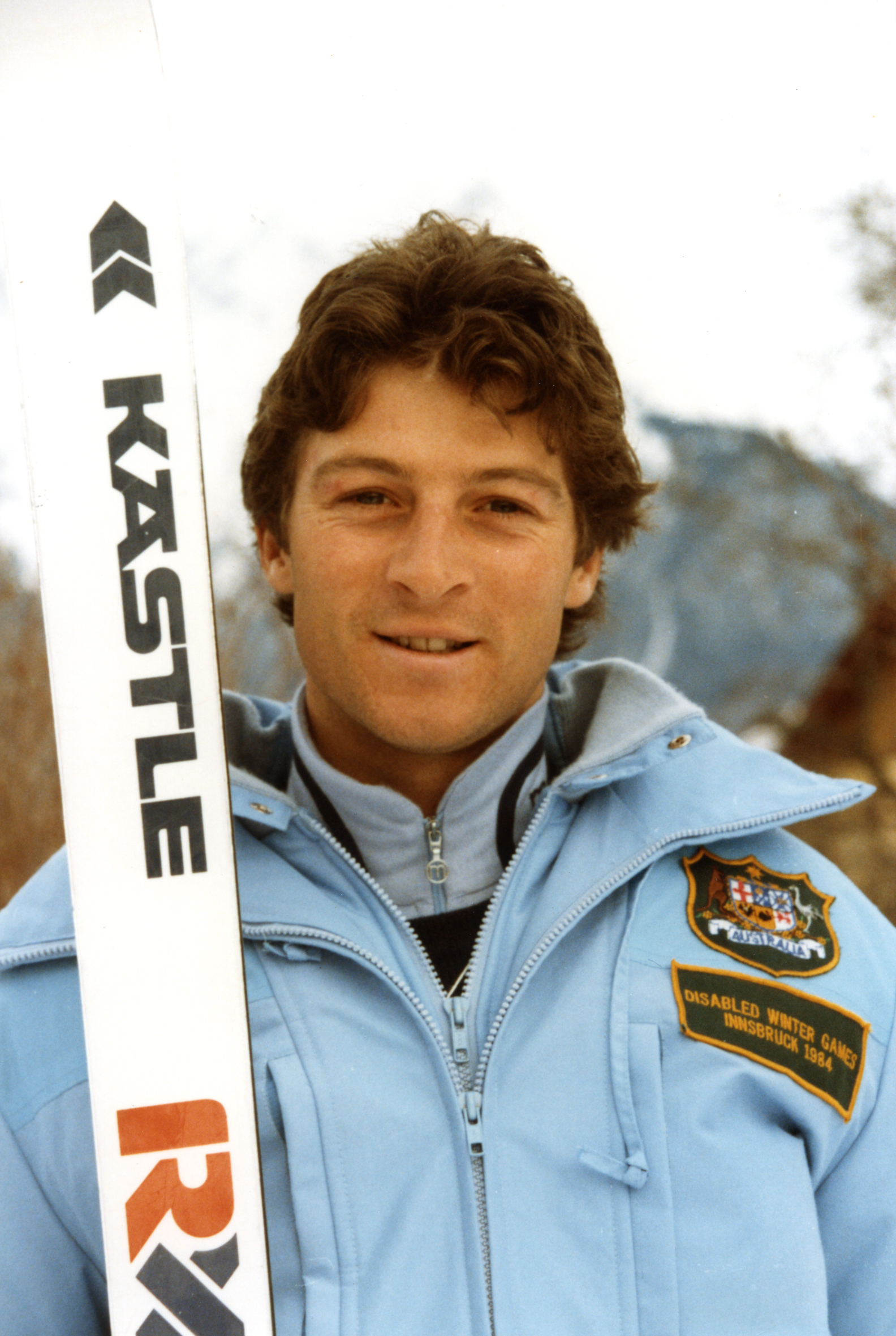
Australian coach James Milner at the 1984 Winter Paralympics

=== Rodney Mill ===
Rodney Mill is a blind athlete who competed in cross country races, the Men's Middle Distance 10 km B2 and the Men's Short Distance 10 km B2.

== Impairment groups ==
Involved in the participation of these games were athletes from the following impairment groups:

- Amputees
  - Athletes in this impairment group have either partial or complete loss of at least one limb.
- Blind and visually impaired
  - Athletes who have sight problems ranging from partial to complete blindness.
- Cerebral palsy
  - Cerebral palsy athletes have difficulties with muscle control, balance and/or co-ordination as a result from non-progressive brain damage
  - First time participating in Winter Games
- Les Autres
  - Les Autres is French for 'the others' and is an impairment group used for athletes whom have a mobility problem or a loss of physical function that does not able to be categorised into one of the other impairment groupings.
  - First time participating in Winter Games
- Spinal cord injuries
  - To be classified in this impairment group, athletes lower limbs need to have at least a 10 per cent loss of function.

== Classification ==
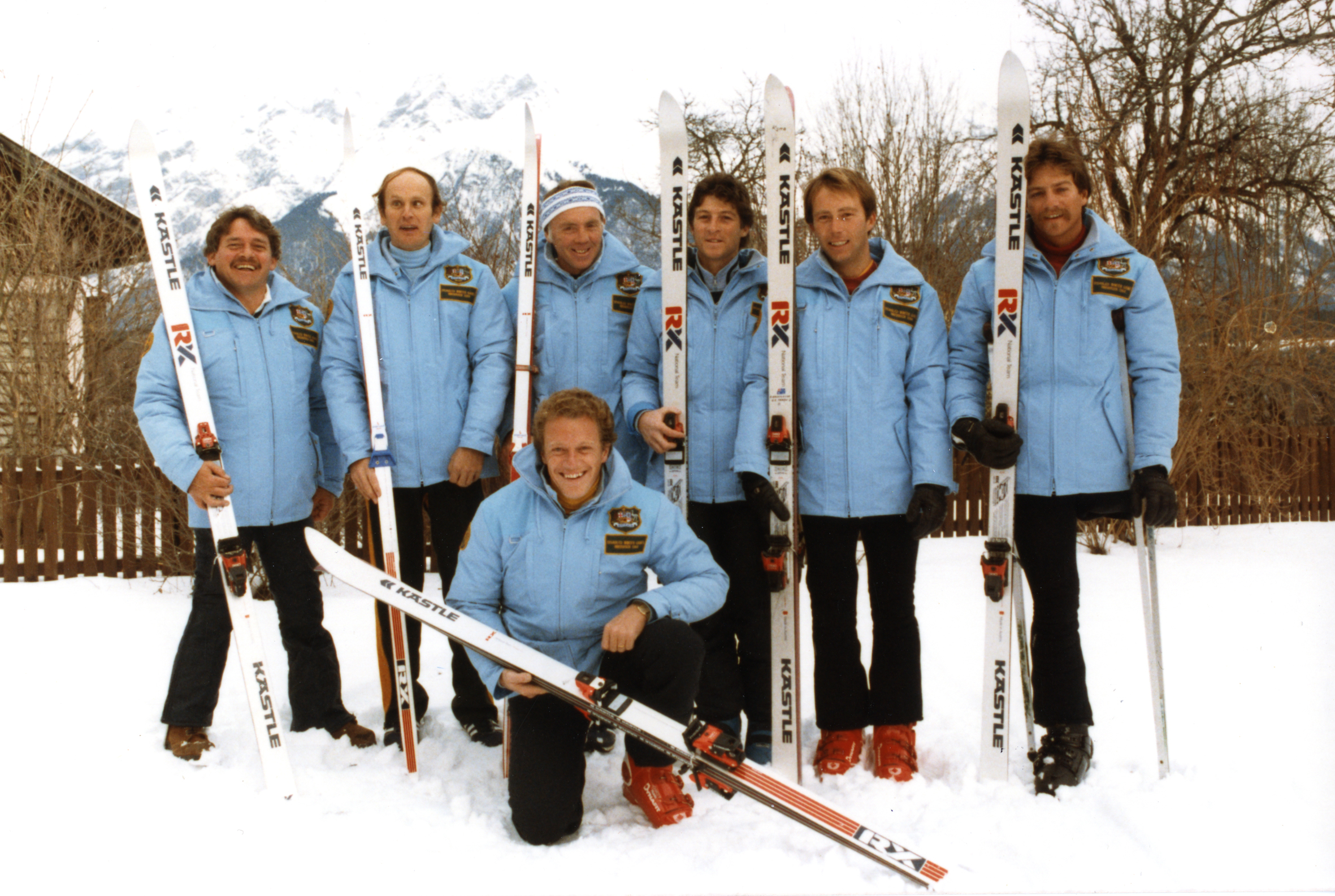
The Australian Paralympic Team, coaches and guide at the 1984 Innsbruck Winter Games

Each event had separate standing, sitting, or visually impaired classifications.

The Australian athletes competed within the standing and visually impaired classification groups:

- LW2 standing:
  - Skiers with a significant impairment to one leg
  - For example, a single leg amputation above the knee
- LW 3 standing:
  - Skiers with a moderate impairment in both legs
  - For example, double leg amputation below the knee, mild cerebral palsy, or equivalent impairment
- LW4 - standing:
  - Similar to LW2
  - Skiers with impairment to one leg however with less limitation of activity
  - For example, a below-the-knee amputation in one leg
- LW5/7 - standing:
  - Skiers with an impairment in both arms, for example a double arm amputation
  - These skiers do not use poles
- LW6/8 - standing:
  - Skiers with an impairment in one arm
  - For example, a single arm amputation
  - Skiers use one pole
- LW9 - standing:
  - Athletes with an impairment affecting arms and legs
  - Amputation or equivalent impairment of one arm and one leg
  - Depending on the impairment, athletes will use either one ski or two and one pole or two
- B1 - visually impaired:
  - Skiers who are blind or have very low visual awareness
  - Skiers wear eyeshades during competition
  - Athletes ski with a guide
- B2 - visually impaired:
  - Athletes with higher visual awareness than athletes in B1
  - Up to ca 3-5% functional vision

== Events ==
The three sports available to competitors were Alpine Skiing, Cross country skiing (Nordic skiing) and ice sledge speed racing. A distinct feature of these games was that the 1984 games was the first time that the downhill event was added to the Paralympic alpine program alongside slalom and giant slalom and sit skiing was demonstrated for the first time.

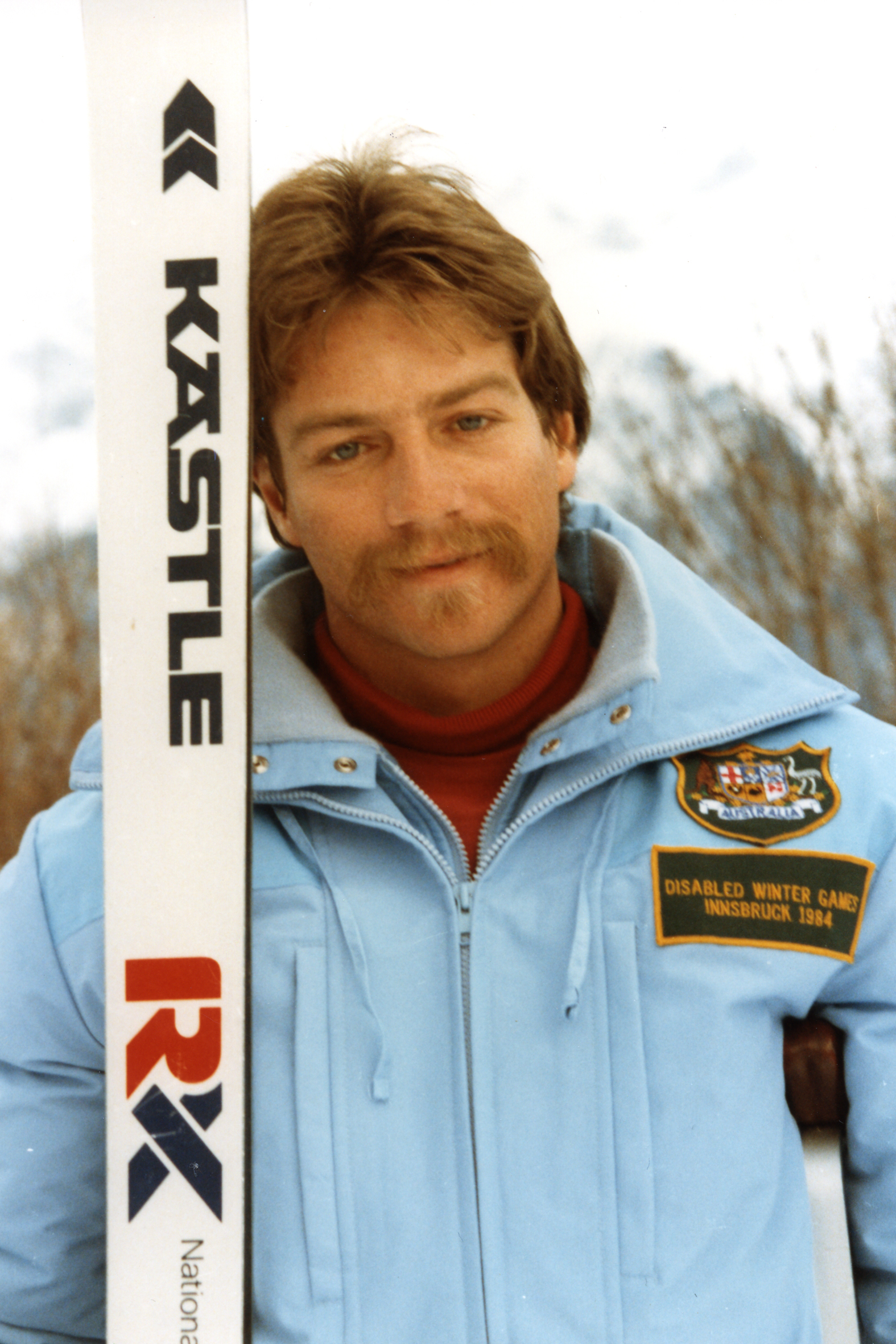
Australian Paralympian Andy Temple at the 1984 Innsbruck Winter Games

=== Alpine skiing ===
Men

Athlete	Event	Time	Rank
Kyrra Grunnsund	Men's Alpine Combination LW4	287.46	5
Kyrra Grunnsund	Men's Downhill LW4	1:11.70	12
Kyrra Grunnsund	Men's Giant Slalom LW4	1:30.08	6
Kyrra Grunnsund	Men's Slalom LW4	1:16.96	8
Andrew Temple	Men's Downhill LW2	1:20.21	22
Andrew Temple	Men's Giant Slalom LW2	DNF	
Andrew Temple	Men's Slalom LW2	1:31.70	20

=== Cross-country skiing ===
A unique feature of Cross-country skiing at the 1984 Winter Paralympics is that nations were permitted to enter more than one team in the relay events (a rule which was changed at subsequent games). This led to Australia winning both silver and gold in the men's 3 x 2.5 km relay Gr I-II, and Finland gold and silver in the men's 4 x 5 km relay LW2-9.

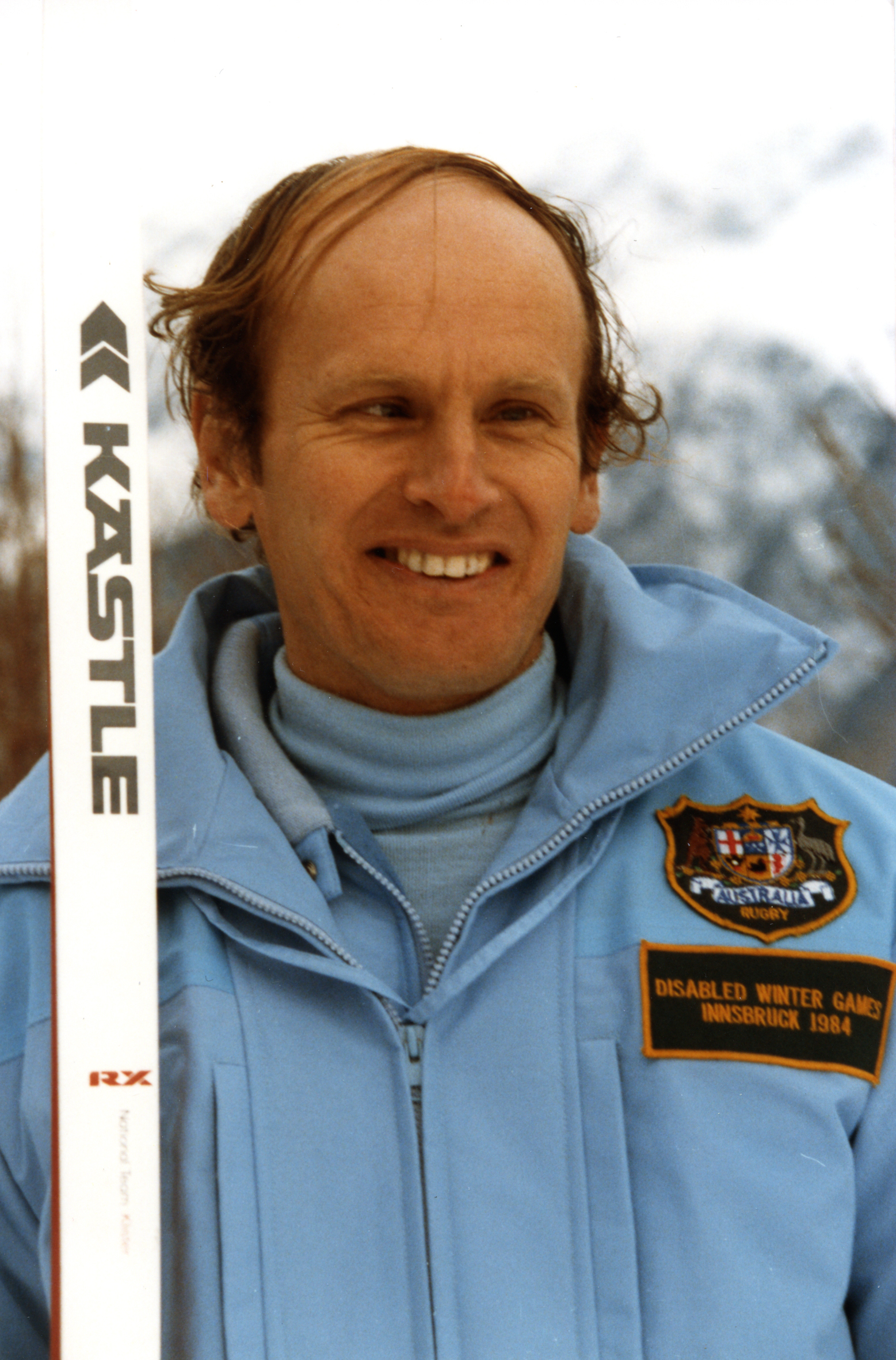
Australian Paralympian athlete Rodney Mill at the 1984 Innsbruck Winter Games

Men

Athlete	Event	Time	Rank
Rodney Mill	Men's Short Distance 10 km B2	43:26.6	23
	Men's Middle Distance 10 km B2	30:17.9	18

=== Medal tally ===
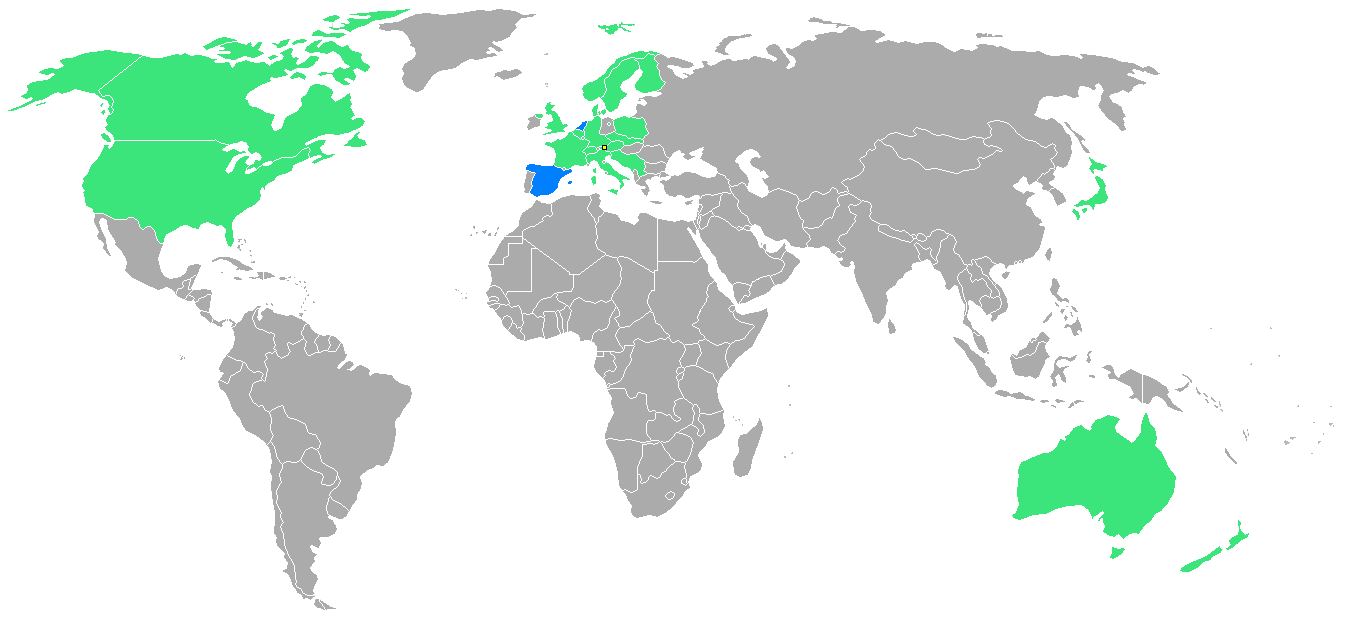
Nations with athlete representatives at the 1984 Winter Paralympics

Australia did not win any medals at these games, with host nation Austria outperforming all others, winning a remarkable 70 medals.

Rank	Country	Gold	Silver	Bronze
1	Austria	34	19	17
2	Finland	19	9	6
3	Norway	15	13	13
4	West Germany	10	14	10
5	United States of America	7	14	14

== Medals ==
The medals assigned for each event had a unique design. Consistency was kept through the design on one side of the medal showing the Olympic rings and the statement "III. World Winter Games for the Physically Disabled", and the other side featuring a representation of that particular sport.

== Future implications ==
On 20 and 21 January 1984, the Holiday Inn in Innsbruck hosted the fifth meeting of the International Coordinating Committee (ICC). A main point of discussion was the continuation of a joint calendar of events and the integrating of disabled event demonstrations at able bodied events. At the end of the two day meeting, a draft agreement for the International Organising Committee was finalised, representing a positive collaborative effort moving forward. Additionally, it was decided that the official name for the organisation would be the International Coordinating Committee (ICC) of World Sports Organisation for the Disabled.

== See also ==
- Australia at the Winter Paralympics
- Australia at the 1984 Summer Paralympics
- 1984 Winter Paralympics
