= Nicholas Dean =

Nicholas or Nick Dean may refer to:

- Nick Dean (Paralympic administrator) (born 1952), Australian sport administrator and wine industry consultant
- List of Jimmy Neutron characters#Nick Dean
- Nicholas Dean (diplomat), United States Ambassador to Bangladesh
- Nicholas Dean (author), winner of a John Lyman Book Award
