= Kevin Coombs =

Australian wheelchair basketballer and athlete (1941–2023)

Kevin Coombs OAM PLY
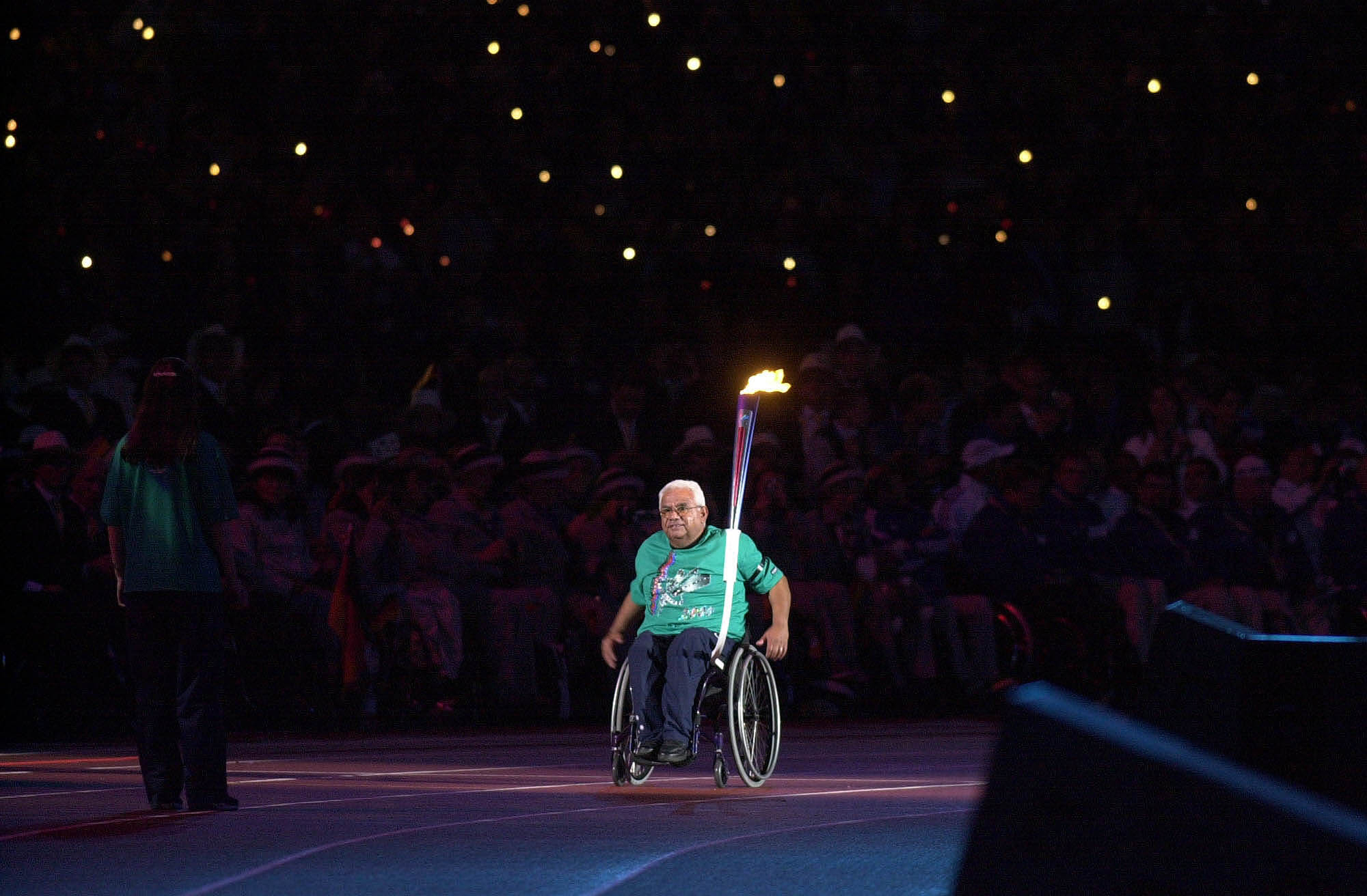
- Coombs carries the Paralympic torch as part of the torch relay at the 2000 Summer Paralympics Opening Ceremony

Personal information
- Full name: Kevin Richard Coombs
- Nationality: Australian
- Born: 30 May 1941 Swan Hill, Victoria, Australia
- Died: 5 October 2023 (aged 82)

Sport
- Country: Australia
- Sport: Wheelchair basketball

Kevin Richard Coombs OAM PLY (30 May 1941 – 5 October 2023) was an Australian wheelchair basketballer and athlete who competed at 5 Paralympics including the first Paralympic Games in 1960. He was the first Australian Aboriginal Paralympic competitor for Australia.

== Personal life ==
It was a really big effort because they [the medical team] didn't know how we were going to travel – we didn't know how we were going to travel either.

— Kevin Coombs

Coombs was born on 30 May 1941 in the Victorian town of Swan Hill, to Cecil Coombs and Rosie Clayton. After losing his mother at age five, he and his four siblings lived with relatives in the New South Wales town of Balranald. He grew up in rural Victoria in a large family. He became a paraplegic at the age of 12 when he was accidentally shot in the back while out shooting rabbits. He spent time at the Royal Austin Rehabilitation Hospital in Melbourne where he was introduced to sport as part of his rehabilitation program. One of the sports that he competed in was wheelchair basketball. He competed in the first Australian championships in 1960 and was then selected to compete at the 1960 Summer Paralympics. Coombs only brought one wheelchair to the Paralympic Games, the wheelchair he used every day. His wheelchair weighed about 40 kilograms (88 lb). Outside of sport, Coombs worked for the Victorian Department of Human Services until 2000. During his career with the Health Services he established the Koori Hospital Liaison Officer program, was the coordinator of the Koori Drug and Alcohol Program and was also Manager of the Koori Health Unit. Before working at the Department of Health Services, Coombs worked for Community Services Victoria. He was a Wotjobaluk elder.

His grandfather, Alfred "Jack" Coombs, as well as Alfred's brother, Willie, served in the Australian Imperial Forces in the Western Front during World War I.

One of Coombs' daughters, Rose Falla, was the first Aboriginal magistrate in Victoria and the first Aboriginal Judge in Victoria. His other daughter, Janine, is the Deputy Chair of Barengi Gadjin Land Council.

Coombs died on 5 October 2023, at age 82.

== Sporting career ==
Coombs was part of the Australia men's national wheelchair basketball team at the 1960 Rome, 1968 Tel Aviv, 1972 Heidelberg, 1980 Arnhem and 1984 New York/Stoke Mandeville Paralympics. He served as coach/captain at the 1972 games and as captain at the 1984 games. He also participated in athletics events at the 1968 and 1972 Paralympics. He captained the silver medal-winning Australian wheelchair basketball team at the 1974 Commonwealth Paraplegic Games in Dunedin, led the Australian team in gold medal performances at the 1977 and 1982 FESPIC Games, captained the team at the 1977 Silver Jubilee Games, and played in the 1983 Wheelchair Basketball World Championship.

== Contribution to the community ==
- Chairman of the Committee for the World Wheelchair Basketball Championships (1986)
- Ambassador for 'National Indigenous Strategy for Literacy and Numeracy'.
- Coach of the Victorian Junior team.
- Member of the Indigenous Committee for the 2006 Commonwealth Games.

== Recognition ==
In 1983 Coombs received a Medal of the Order of Australia "in recognition of service to sport for the disabled and to Aboriginal welfare". He had a street named after him at Sydney Olympic Park.

In 2000, Coombs was selected as one of final torch bearers for the Paralympic torch relay during the 2000 Summer Paralympics opening, carrying the torch inside the Stadium Australia. That year, he received an Australian Sports Medal.

In 2007, Coombs was inducted into the Australian Basketball Hall of Fame.

Basketball Australia holds a national annual Kevin Coombs Cup for Juniors with the first held in 2007.

In 2011, the Victorian Department of Health and Department of Human Services named a meeting room in honour of Coombs achievements.

In 2012, Coombs was inducted into the Victorian Indigenous Honour Roll.

He was a life Member of Paravics / Wheelchair Sports Victoria.

In December 2016, he was inducted into the Australian Paralympic Hall of Fame.

At the 2016 Australian Paralympic Committee awards, the Uncle Kevin Coombs Medal for the Spirit of the Games was awarded for the first time.

After his death in 2023, Coombs was awarded National Trailblazer Award at National Indigenous Sporting Awards

He was the first person conferred the 'PLY' postnominal letters.

== Bibliography ==
- Coombs, K. A Fortunate accident : a boy from Balranald. Melbourne, Aboriginal Affairs, Victoria.
