= Adrian Smith =

Adrian Smith may refer to:

- Adrian Smith (basketball) (1936–2026), American basketball player
- Adrian Smith (architect) (born 1944), American architect
- Sir Adrian Smith (statistician) (born 1946), English statistician and academic
- Adrian Smith (musician) (born 1957), English musician, member of the band Iron Maiden
- Adrian Smith (strongman) (born 1964), British professional strongman competitor
- Adrian Smith (politician) (born 1970), United States representative from Nebraska's 3rd congressional district
- Adrian Smith (illustrator), British illustrator of game materials
- Adrian Smith (rugby union) (born 1987), New Zealand rugby player
