= Disabled Wintersport Australia =

Disabled Wintersport Australia (DWA) was established in 1978 as the Australian Disabled Skiers Federation. Its current mission is "to promote and foster the advancement of participation by people with a disability in wintersport both in Australia and overseas". DWA is a member of the Australian Paralympic Committee. DWA plays a major role in the development of Australian athletes that compete at the Winter Paralympics.

== Administration ==
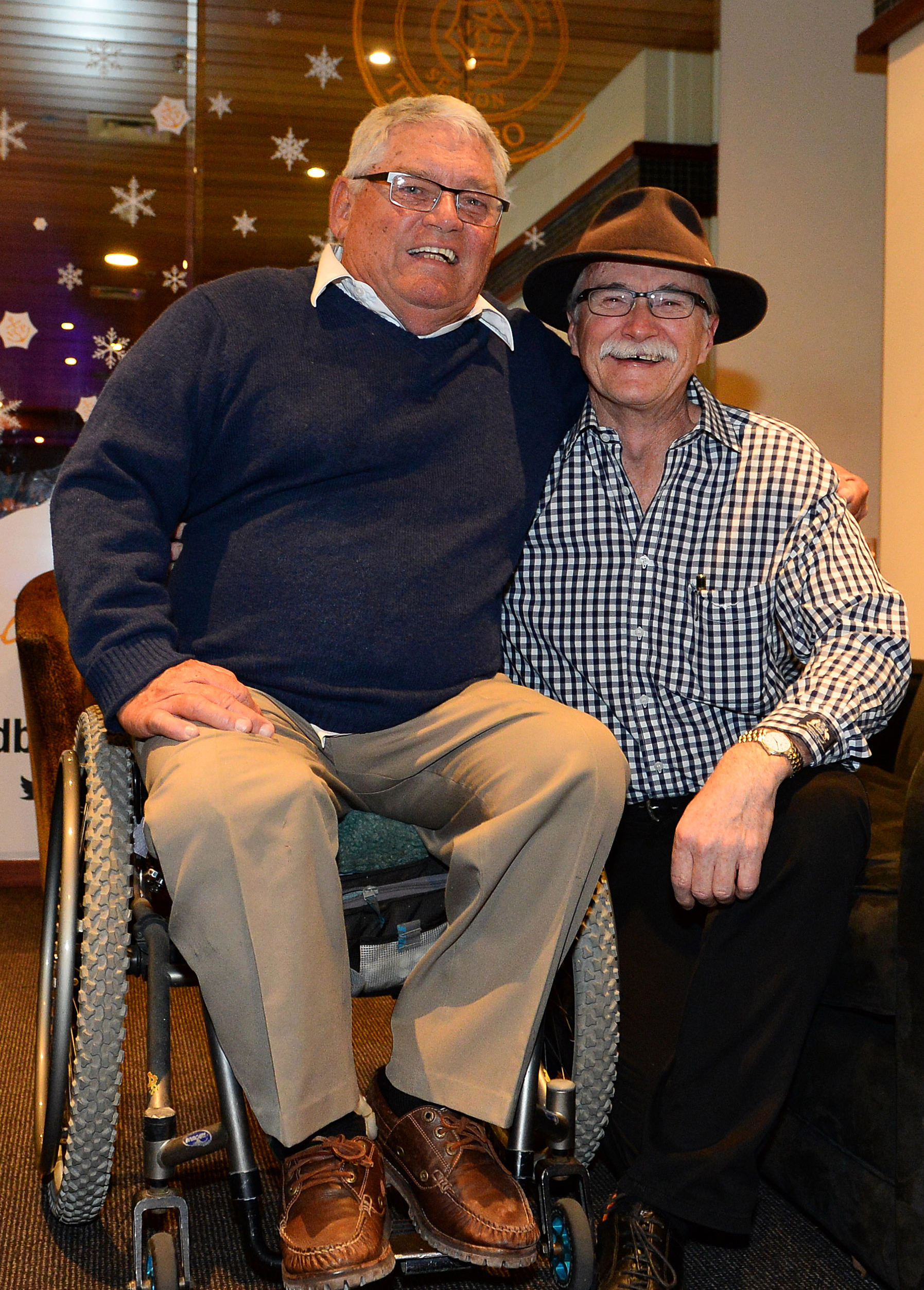
Two of the founders of Disabled Wintersport Australia, Ron Finneran (L) and Nick Dean (R) at a function on 3 September 2013 in Thredbo during the first IPC alpine skiing world cup event to be held in Australia, conducted by the Australian Paralympic Committee

.

Presidents:

- Ron Finneran 1978–1984
- Bruce Abel 1985
- Nick Dean 1986–2001
- Adrienne Smith 2002–2009
- Ashley Blondel 2009–

chief executive officers:

- Ron Finneran 1986–2010
- Eric Bickerton 2012–2015
- Dr Neil Fisher 2016 – 2017
- Richard Coate 2017–2021
- Jenni Cole 2021-

Patron:

- Captain Richard de Crespigny 2013–?

Ambassadors

- Joany Badenhorst 2017–
- Mitchell Gourley 2017–

== Milestones ==
- 1976 – 1st Winter Paralympic Games held in Sweden. Australia was unofficially represented at these Games by Ron Finneran, who competed but was not officially recognised as he did not fall into the amputee or visual impairment categories.
- 1978 – Australian Disabled Skiers Federation (ADSA) was established in 1978 by Ron Finneran and Canadian ski instructor Bruce Abel. Ron Finneran was the first President, a position he held until 1984. Other people at the inaugural meeting were Nick Dean, Rod Dunning, Arnold Conrad and Maurice Flutey. It was established primarily to provide facilities for people with a disability to learn to ski.
- 1979 – ASDA became affiliated to the Australian Ski Federation due to the support of Adrienne Smith, its National Executive Director.
- 1982 – ADSA became a member of the Australian Sports Council for the Disabled which meant that it was able to apply for government funding.
- 1990–1991 – ADSA received its first funding grant from the Australian Sports Commission. The grant was $46,500.
- 1992 – Australian Disabled Skiers Federation opened its own ski lodge called Finsko's Lodge at the Jindabyne Winter Sports Academy. The name of the lodge recognised Ron Finneran's considerable work to its development.
- 1993 – Michael Milton became the first winter Paralympian to receive an Australian Institute of Sport (AIS) scholarship.
- 1996 – Australian Disabled Skiers Federation changed its name to Disabled Wintersport Australia.
- 1999 – Redevelopment of Finsko's Lodge.
- 2001 – AIS and Australian Paralympic Committee established an AIS/APC Alpine Ski Program. It was the first single sport AIS program for athletes with a disability.
- 2002 – Australia's best performance at Winter Paralympics winning six gold and one bronze medal at the Australia at the 2002 Winter Paralympics.
- 2009 – DWA adopts a new constitution and moves to a unitary model that appoints board directors with specific skills.
- 2009 – Adrienne Smith retired as President of DWA.
- 2010 – Ron Finneran retired as chief executive officer.
- 2010 – Jessica Gallagher became the first female to win a medal for Australia at the Winter Paralympics.
- 2013 – Her Excellency the Governor-General of Australia Quentin Bryce announced Captain Richard de Crespigny as the first Patron.
- 2014 – Australia wins 2 silver medals at the Winter Paralympics.
- 2018 – DWA celebrates 40-year anniversary

== Activities ==
DWA provide the following services to its members:

- training programs at ski resorts in New South Wales and Victoria
- access to specific disability equipment – outriggers, 4-track, 3-track and sit skiers
- in conjunction with the APC and Special Olympics Australia a pathway from grassroots to elite international competition

== Winter Paralympics ==
Australia has been represented at every Winter Paralympics. Its first official team was in 1980 with two athletes. Australian athletes that have won gold medals – Michael Milton, Bart Bunting and his guide Nathan Chivers, Michael Norton and James Patterson. Simon Patmore won Gold for snowboard-cross at PyeongChang Paralympic Winter Games 2018, breaking a 16-year drought for Australia.

== See also ==
- Australia at the Winter Paralympics
