= Nick Dean (Paralympic administrator) =

Australian sports administrator

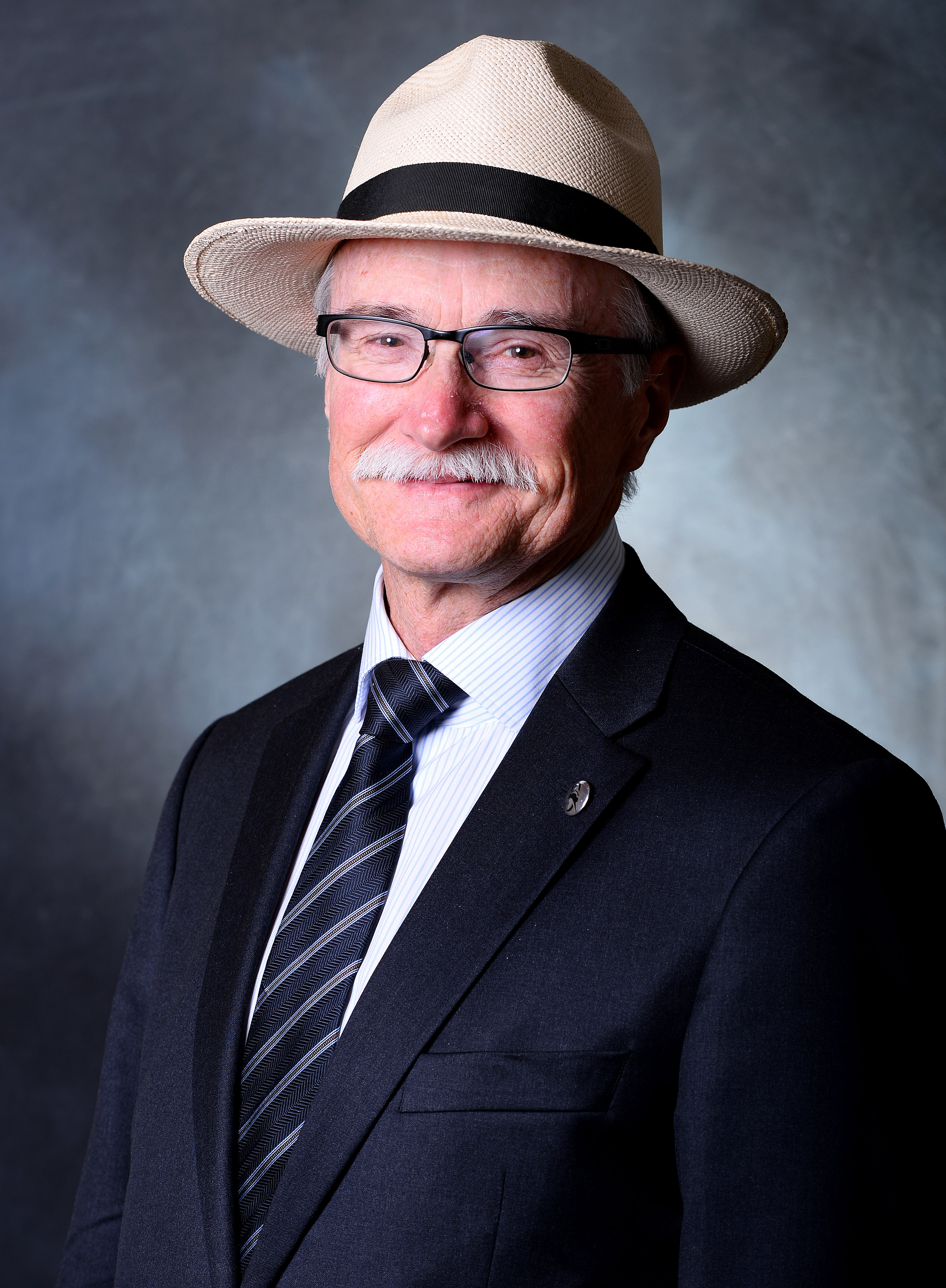
Nick Dean, Australian Paralympic administrator

Nicholas "Nick" Grant Dean OAM (born 1952) is a leading Australian sport administrator and wine industry consultant. Dean has made a significant contribution to the Australian Paralympic movement.

== Personal ==
Dean's father Henry who died in 2008 was born in India, fought in World War II and was a ski instructor. Dean has three children and lives in Adelaide.

== Business career ==
Dean became involved in the Australian wine industry through his father. His family has vineyards in the Adelaide Hills and is a major supplier of grapes to Petaluma Wines (Lion Nathan). He is chair of Project Wine, which provides "crush" services. He is currently employed by Colliers International as a specialist consultant to the Australian wine industry. Dean has stated that Colliers has provided support to allow him to dedicate time to the Paralympic movement.

== Skiing ==
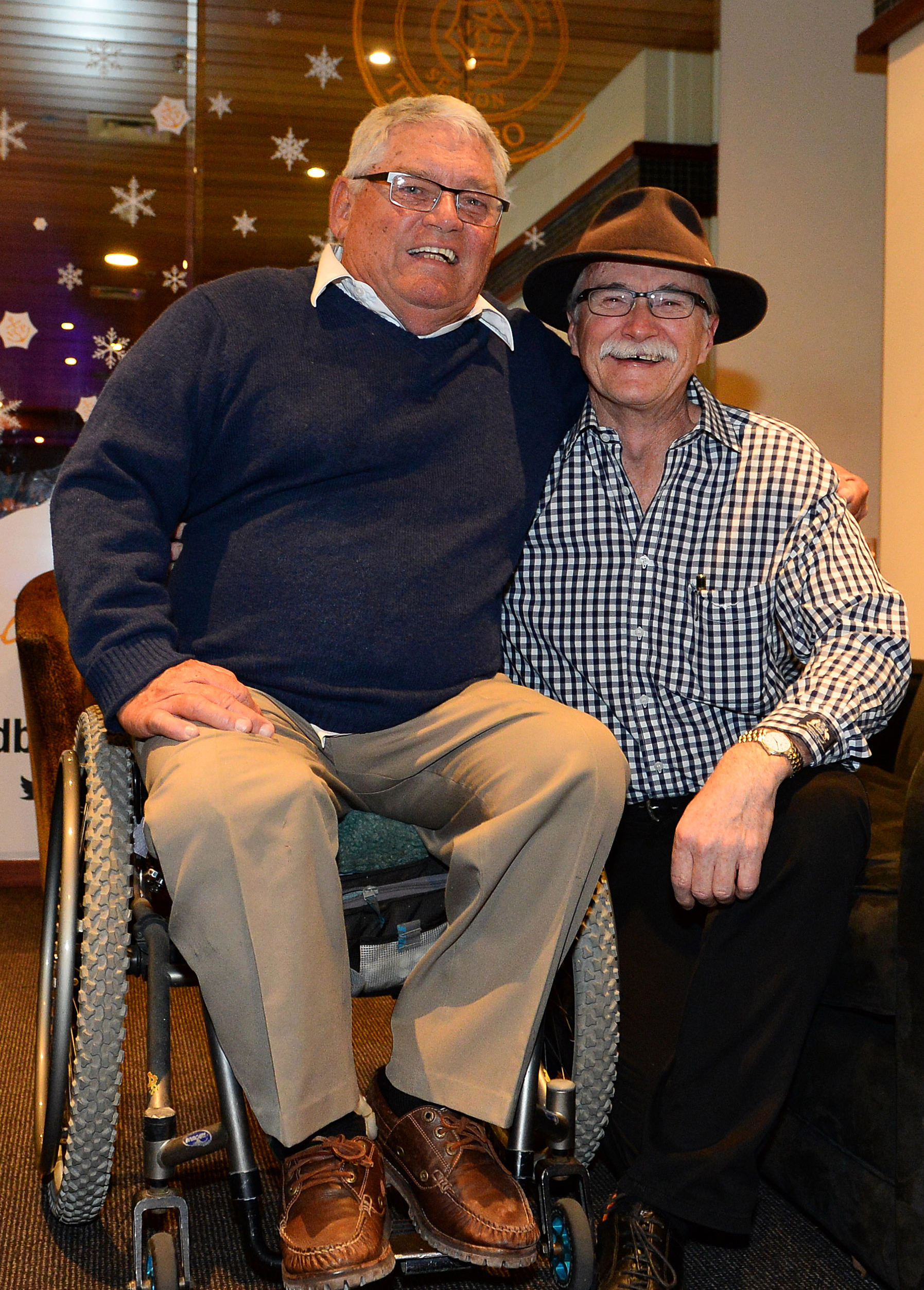
Two of the founders of Disabled Wintersport Australia, Ron Finneran (L) and Nick Dean (R) at a function on 3 September 2013 in Thredbo during the first IPC alpine skiing world cup event to be held in Australia, conducted by the Australian Paralympic Committee

Dean's involvement in skiing was through his father Henry who took him to the Australian Alps in 1963. In 1972, after completing university, Dean moved to Thredbo Ski Resort to work as a ski instructor. He was a ski instructor for ten years working in United States ski resorts during the Australian summer. Whilst working at Thredbo he became involved with people skiing with a disability including Ron Finneran. In 1978, he was at the inaugural meeting to establish the Australian Disabled Skiers Federation (ADSA) which was later called Disabled Winter Sport Australia. He was President of Disabled WinterSport Australia from 1990 to 2004 and 2008-2009, Treasurer from 2005 to 2007. In 1975, a founding member and the first Vice President of the Australian Professional Ski Instructors Association, a position he held between 1975 and 1980. Since 2007, he has been a member of the International Paralympic Committee (IPC) Alpine Skiing Sport Technical Committee.

== Australian Paralympic Committee ==
In 1992, he joined the Board of the Australian Paralympic Committee, a position he held continuouisly ( except in 1995) until 2015. He was Vice-President from 2000 to 2013. He was Chef de Mission for the Australian Winter Paralympic Games teams that competed at the 1994 Lillehammer Games, 1998 Nagano Games, 2002 Salt Lake City Games, 2018 Pyeongchang and Assistant Chef de Mission at Australian Winter Paralympic Games teams at 1992 Albertville Games, 2006 Torino Games, 2010 Vancouver Games and Australian Summer Paralympics teams at 2004 Athens Games and 2008 Beijing Games. In 2005, the Committee awarded him the Australian Paralympic Medal for his commitment to sport for people with a disability.

== Recognition ==
Dean has been recognised for his work, receiving several awards including:

- 2000 - Australian Sports Medal
- 2002 - Contribution to Skiing Award, Australian Ski Federation
- 2005 - Australian Paralympic Medal for his commitment to sport for people with a disability.
- 2014 - Medal of the Order of Australia for service to sport, particularly athletes with a disability.
- 2026 - Australian Paralympic Hall of Fame
