= Adrienne Smith (American football) =

Boston Renegades wide receiver

Adrienne Smith is a women’s tackle football player and an entrepreneur. She was born in Alexandria, Virginia.

== Education ==
Smith has an undergraduate degree in Japanese with a minor in film from Washington University in St. Louis. She also has an MBA from Columbia Business School, New York City. She lived and worked in Japan for three years as a translator and Coordinator of International Relations for the Japanese Board of Education.

== Professional career ==
She was a wide receiver for the Boston Renegades. Smith began her professional career as an athlete in 2006. In 2010 and 2013, she helped the U.S. women's national American football team win the gold medal in the International Federation of American Football's Women's World Championship.

Smith began playing with the Boston Renegades in 2011 and has won six Women's Football Alliance national championships with the team. Smith set the all-time record for receiving yards in the WFA in 2022.

Smith has stated that she has been passionate about football from an early age. She started overseeing the American Flag Football League’s Women’s Division in 2021. Smith is the co-founder of Harlem Hip-Hop Tours, a company that creates field trips for students. Smith is also the founder of Blitz Champz, a football related card game.

== Legacy ==
Smith and fellow football stars Joann Overstreet and Jona Xiao and D.C. Divas receiver Lois Cook are part of Team Milk, which is part of a Got Milk? campaign. In 2022, Smith was honored as one of VIBE Magazine's Voices of the Year. In 2023, she was recognized as one of "Boston’s most admired, beloved, and successful Black Women leaders" by the Black Women Lead project.
