= Eric Bickerton =

Australian Paralympic alpine guide skier

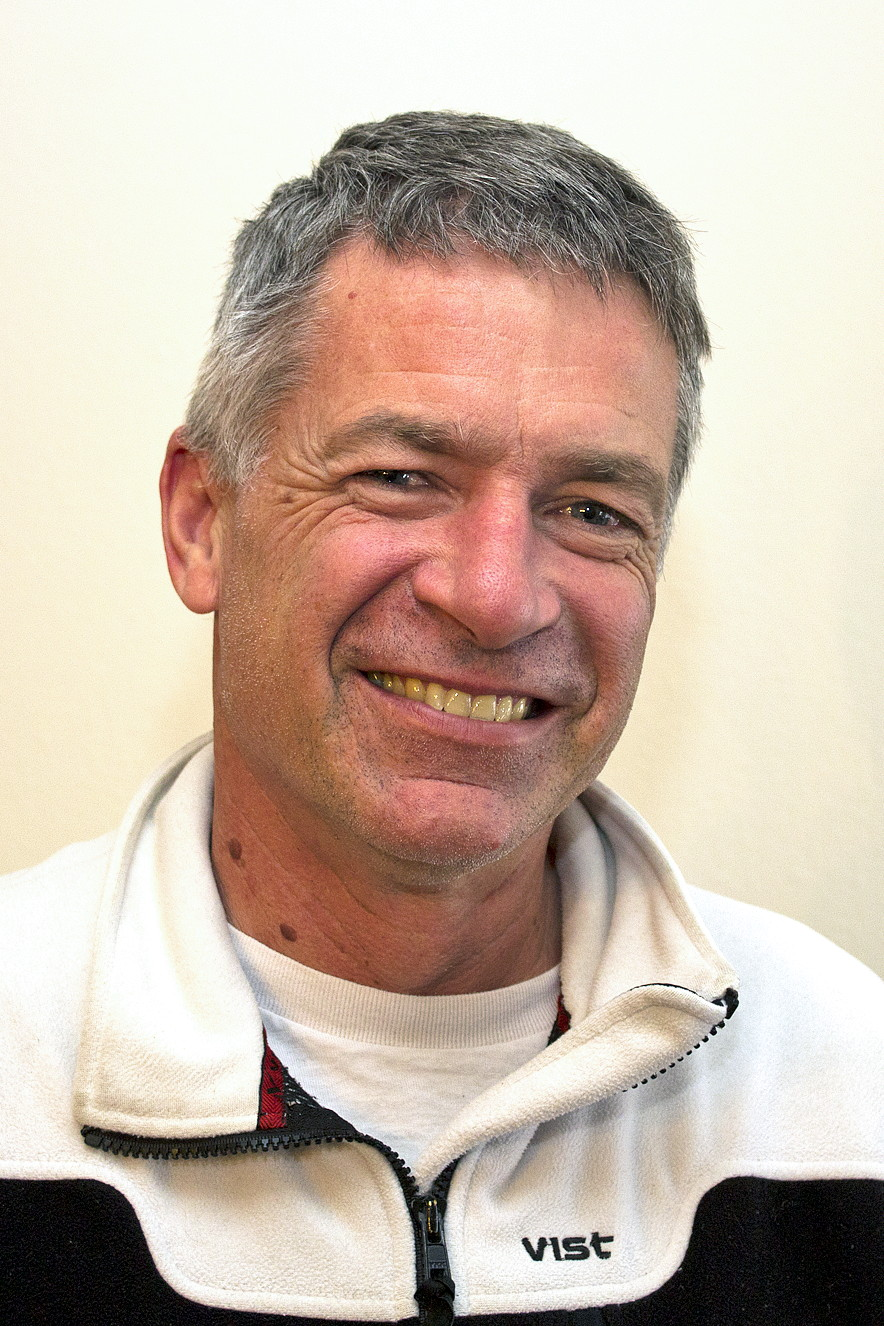
- Bickerton in December 2012

Personal information
- Nationality: Australian
- Born: 24 April 1962 (age 64)

Sport
- Country: Australia
- Sport: Para-alpine skiing
- Events: Downhill; Super-G; Giant slalom Slalom

Achievements and titles
- Paralympic finals: 2010 Winter Paralympics
Medal record
Women's alpine skiing
Representing Australia
Paralympic Games
| Bronze medal – third place | 2010 Vancouver | Women's slalom visually impaired |

Eric Bickerton (born 24 April 1962) is a former member of the Royal Australian Navy who took up skiing in 1990, and has represented the Australian military internationally. In 2008, he became Jessica Gallagher's guide skier for para-alpine skiing. Named to the 2010 Winter Paralympics team for Australia, he and Gallagher earned a bronze medal in the giant slalom event.

== Personal ==
Wikinews reporters Laura Hale and Hawkeye7 interview Australian Paralympic skier Jessica Gallagher and her guide Eric Bickerton

Bickerton was born on 24 April 1962, and was a member of the Royal Australian Navy, actively serving in 1990. He retired from the navy in 2000. He represented the Australian military in rugby union. In 2010, he lived in Southport, Queensland. He is self-employed, and leads ski tours around the world as a guide. He is on the board of Disabled Winter Sport Australia, and serves as the National Technical Delegate Commissioner for Ski & Snowboard Australia.

== Skiing ==
Bickerton is a skier, ski tour guide and para-alpine skiing guide skier. He began skiing in 1990, while serving in the Australian Navy. Representing the Australian military, he finished seventh at the International Military Downhill Championships. Bickerton, Jessica Gallagher's senior by 23 years, became her guide skier in 2008. While skiing, Bickerton communicates through the use of a headset with Gallagher, who is legally blind. In 2009, he guided Gallagher at the 2009 New Zealand Winter Games where she won a gold medal.

Bickerton was named as Gallagher's guide for the Australian 2010 Winter Paralympic team in November 2009. At the January 2010 IPC World Cup, Gallagher won a gold medal with Bickerton acting as her guide, the first medal Gallagher had ever won at an IPC World Cup. At a Rinn-hosted 2010 World Cup, Gallagher won bronze in the slalom, and at the January 2010 IPC World Cup in an Abtenau, Austria, she finished third, also in the slalom.

Bickerton was Gallagher's guide when winning a bronze medal in the slalom event at the 2010 Winter Paralympics, with a combined run time of 2:04.35. Success in the giant slalom eluded them in part because their headsets stopped working.
