= Adrienne Smith (sport administrator) =

Australian sport administrator (1934-2012)

Adrienne Mary Elise Smith OAM (19 January 1934 – 20 February 2012) was an Australian sport administrator. She played a significant role in the establishment of the Australian Paralympic Federation in 1990.

== Personal ==
She was born Adrienne Mary Elise Funda in Murwillumbah, New South Wales. She was the only child of Paul and Margery Funda. Smith’s early life was in Balmoral, New South Wales and she attended North Sydney Girls High School. In 1960, she married Roger Smith who was in the British Army and they had two daughters Nicola and Cecilia. Her marriage broke up after 12 years.

After leaving the Australian Paralympic Federation in 1992, she brought a mango farm at Grassy Head, on the Mid North Coast, New South Wales. She worked as a volunteer at the local Stuarts Point and District Community and Yarrahapinni Festival. She died after a battle with pancreatic cancer.

== Career ==
She worked in the Charlotte Pass ski fields for the NSW Ski Association after leaving school. This was the start of her long career of assisting athletes with a disability. Whilst at Charlotte Pass, she became involved with Disabled Winter Sport Australia and met Ron Finneran. In 1977, she became executive director of New South Wales Ski Association and two years later took on a similar role at the Australian Ski Federation. She acknowledges that Ron Finneran, Australia’s first winter Paralympian, played a significant role in educating her in the area of disability sport.

In 1984, she took up the position of the national co-ordinator for sport and recreation for the Australian Bicentennial Authority. In this position, she is credited as obtaining $500,000 for disability sport programs. Whilst in this position, Smith realised that there was the need for a national organisation for disability sport to provide better co-ordination. Due to her work for the Authority’s Sport88 program, she was named Australian Sports Administrator of the Year.

She became the Australian Paralympic Federation's inaugural Secretary-General in 1990. The Federation brought together a range of disparate disability groups such as riding for the disabled, amputee, cerebral palsy and others with the aim of improving access to international competition, coaching and training facilities. The Federation received no government funding in the first two years and a great deal of her time was spent trying to convince business to provide financial support. Some of her work was done pro bono due to the Federation having limited funds. Due to the Federation's lack of funds, she personally underwrote the Australian team that attended the 1992 Albertville Winter Paralympics. At these Games, Michael Milton went on to win Australia’s first winter Paralympics gold medal. With Federation President Ron Finneran, she lobbied to ensure the Paralympics were part of Sydney’s bid for the 2000 Olympics and underwritten by the Federal and State Governments. Smith commented that, "We couldn’t go public because if we did it would have ruined the Olympic bid. We had no acknowledgement of financial support from the government until the day of the bid in September 1993." Australia went on to win the bid and host a very successful Paralympic Games.

After she left the Federation, she started research on the history of the Paralympic movement in Australia. In 2000, she ran a leg of the Sydney Olympics torch relay in Urunga, New South Wales. After her death in 2012, Greg Hartung, the President of the Australian Paralympic Committee said, "Through her enthusiasm for Paralympic sport, Adrienne brought many people into our movement. Australian Paralympic athletes, coaches and administrators today benefit from Adrienne’s pioneering work. Adrienne successfully established the Australian Paralympic Federation and saw it through the tumultuous early years. Her legacy continues in the form of a strong and professional organisation and a movement which goes from strength to strength"

== Recognition ==
She was recognized for her work for disability sport and sports administration.

- 2000 – Australian Sports Medal.
- 2004 – Australian Paralympic Medal, the highest award for a non-athlete.
- 2008 – Order of Australia in 2008 for her services to sports administration.
- 2016 – Inducted into the Australian Paralympic Hall of Fame.
