= Ron Finneran =

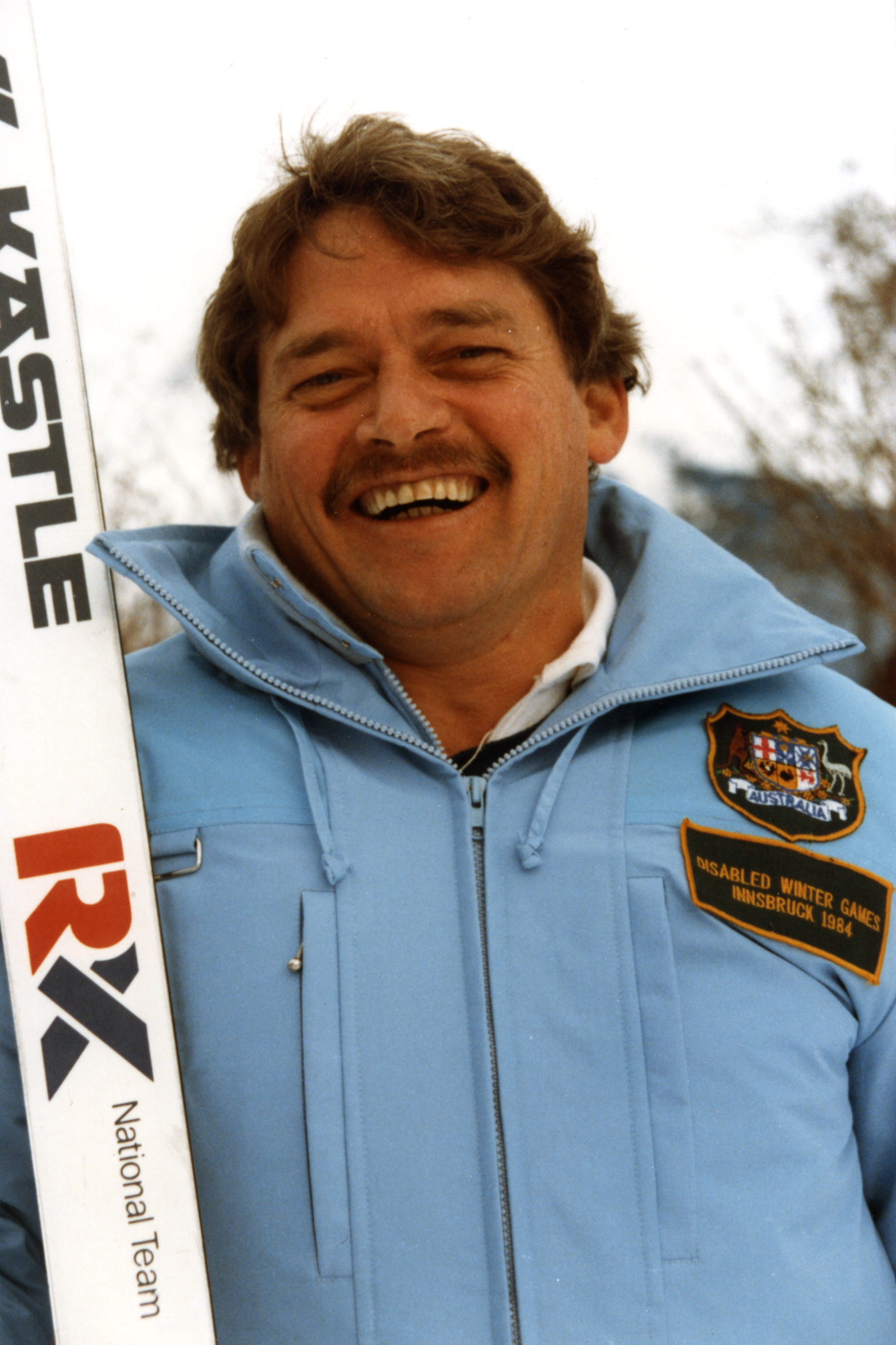
Australian Paralympic athlete Ron Finneran at the 1984 Innsbruck Winter Games

Ronald James Finneran OAM (born 1944) is an Australian Paralympic athlete and sports administrator, from Merimbula, New South Wales.

== Skiing career ==
Finneran was born in the Sydney suburb of Maroubra. He lost the full use of both his legs and his right arm after contracting polio aged about 20 months. He took up skiing in 1972 after a visit to the Thredbo Ski Resort and trained in the United States and Canada. He was Australia's only participant at the 1976 Winter Paralympics in Örnsköldsvik, Sweden, where he marched in the opening ceremony. However, he did not compete, as there were no events for his disability. He remained in Sweden after the Games until 1978 to study and train. At the 1984 World Championships in Switzerland he came 4th in the downhill.

== Sports administration ==
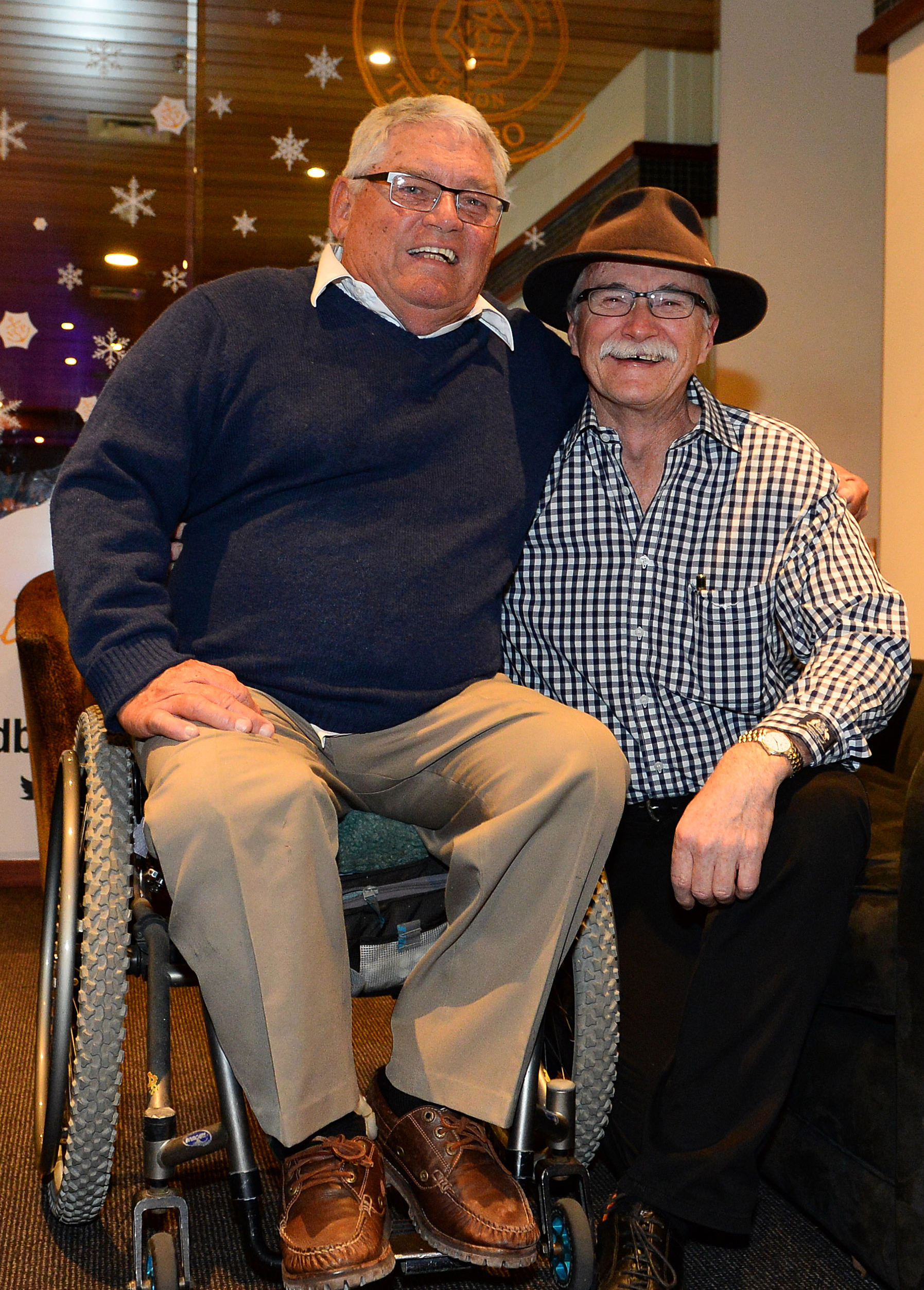
Two of the founders of Disabled Wintersport Australia, Ron Finneran (L) and Nick Dean (R) at a function on 3 September 2013 in Thredbo during the first IPC alpine skiing world cup event to be held in Australia, conducted by the Australian Paralympic Committee

In 1978, with Canadian ski instructor Bruce Abel and Australian ski instructor Nick Dean, he formed the Australian Disabled Skiers Federation, now Disabled Wintersport Australia (DWA). He retired as Executive Director of DWA in January 2010 after 31 years in the role. Whilst in the role of Executive Director, he was able transform disabled skiing in Australia particularly in terms of facilities, training programs, talent development and government support. In 1992, Australian Disabled Skiing Federation opened its own ski lodge called Finsko's Lodge, the name of the lodge recognized Finneran's considerable work to its development. He also played a major role in the establishment of the Jindabyne Winter Academy, a program designed to assist elite and talented able bodied and disabled alpine skiers. The result of Finneran's worked culminated in 2001 with the Australian Institute of Sport establishing a Paralympic Alpine Skiing Program in conjunction with the Australian Paralympic Committee.

In 1989, he was a member of a working group that helped to establish the Australian Paralympic Federation in January 1990. He was a Board Member of the Federation from 1990 to 1995. He was also president of the Australian Paralympic Federation in 1993. In 1993, he was Chairman of the Bid Committee for the 2000 Sydney Paralympic Games.

Besides his participation at the 1976 Winter Paralympics, he was Chef de Mission/Team Manager of the Australian teams at the 1980, 1984, 1988, 1992 and 1994 Winter Paralympics.

Other sports administration roles included: Member of the Advisory Committee to the Australian Bicentennial Authority's National Disabled Sports Program (1984 to 1988) and Chairman of the New South Wales Advisory Committee for Athletes with a Disability (1987 to 1992).

After receiving his OAM in 2005, he stated "To have had just a small part in profiling the abilities of people with disabilities, be it in recreational activities to the very elite in Paralympic sport, has been an enormously rewarding experience."

== Recognition ==
- 2000 – Australian Sports Medal
- 2002 – Australian Paralympic Medal, highest non-athlete award by the Australian Paralympic Committee
- 2004 – OAM for service to sport for people with disabilities as an administrator and competitor.
- 2005 – inducted into the Sport Australia Hall of Fame as an Associate Member.
- 2016 – inducted into the Australian Paralympic Hall of Fame.
- 2021 - Snow Australia Medal
- Life Member of Northcott Society
