= Australia at the 1992 Winter Paralympics =

- IPC code: AUS
- NPC: Australian Paralympic Committee
- Website: www.paralympic.org.au

in Tignes-Albertville
- Competitors: 5 in 1 sport
- Medals Ranked 12th: Gold 1 Silver 1 Bronze 2 Total 4

Winter Paralympics appearances (overview)
- 1976; 1980; 1984; 1988; 1992; 1994; 1998; 2002; 2006; 2010; 2014; 2018; 2022; 2026

Australia competed at the 1992 Winter Paralympics in Tignes and Albertville in France. They were the first winter Paralympics to be celebrated concurrently with the Olympic Games. The official logo of the Games was designed by Jean-Michel Folon. It depicts a bird with broken wings, soaring high across the peak of a mountain. This was used to reflect the sporting abilities of the athletes at the Games. The official mascot, Alpy, designed by Vincent Thiebaut, represented the summit of the Grande Motte mountain in Tignes. Alpy was shown on a mono-ski to demonstrate its athleticism and the colours of white, green and blue were used to represent purity/snow, hope/nature and discipline/the lake. The 1992 Games were where Australia won their first winter medals at the Paralympics. Michael Milton won Australia's first gold with a win in the men's slalom LW2. Milton also won a silver medal in the men's super-G LW2. At these Games, Australia was represented by 5 male athletes. Australia was placed 12th in the overall medal tally for the Winter Games winning a total of 4 medals: 1 gold, 1 silver and 2 bronze.

== Athletes ==
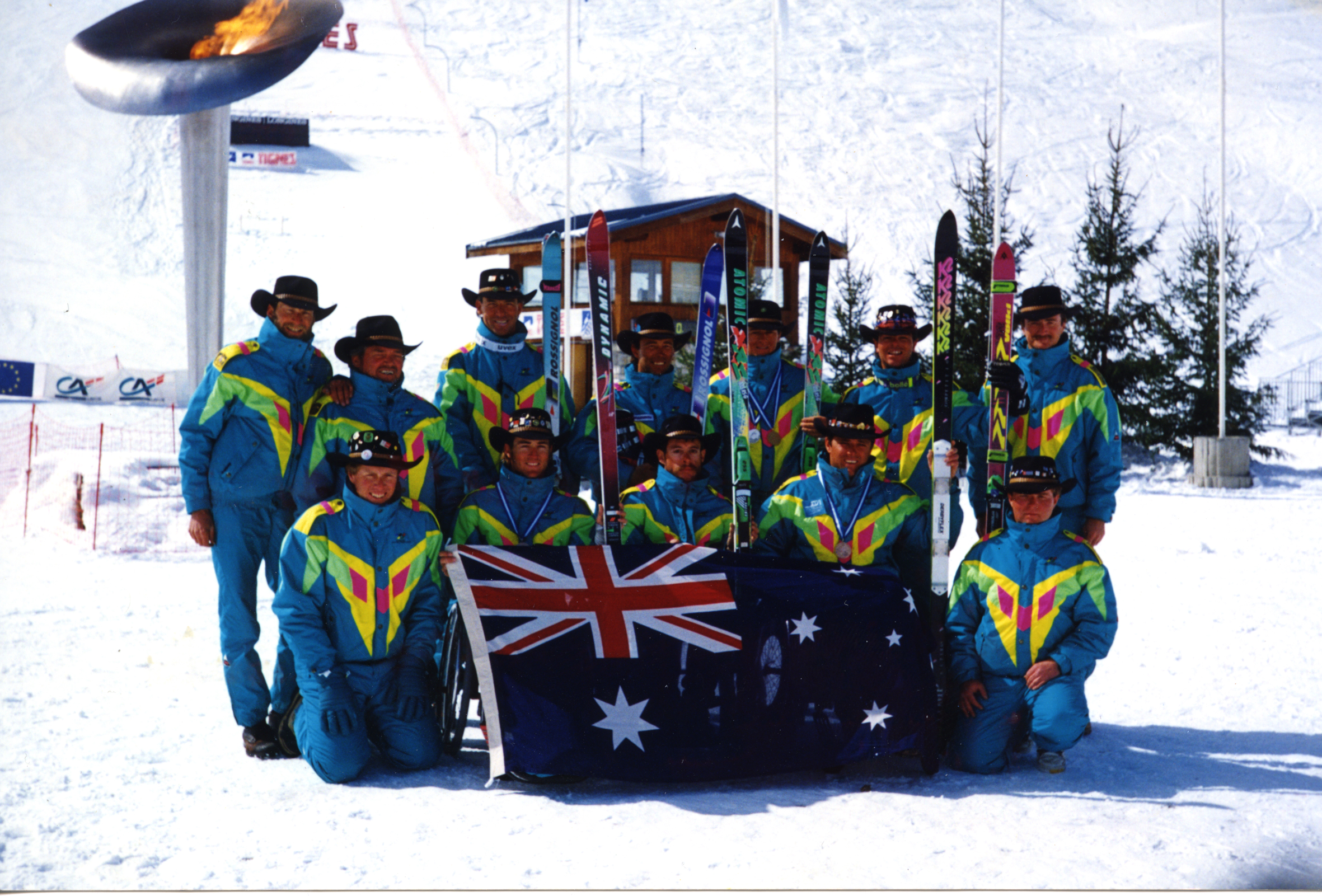
the Australian Team at the 1992 Winter Games

Michael Milton - Alpine skiing

Michael Norton - Alpine skiing

David Munk - Alpine skiing

Rod Hacon - Alpine skiing

Kyrra Grunnsund - Alpine skiing

David McPherson - Alpine skiing

=== Notable performances ===
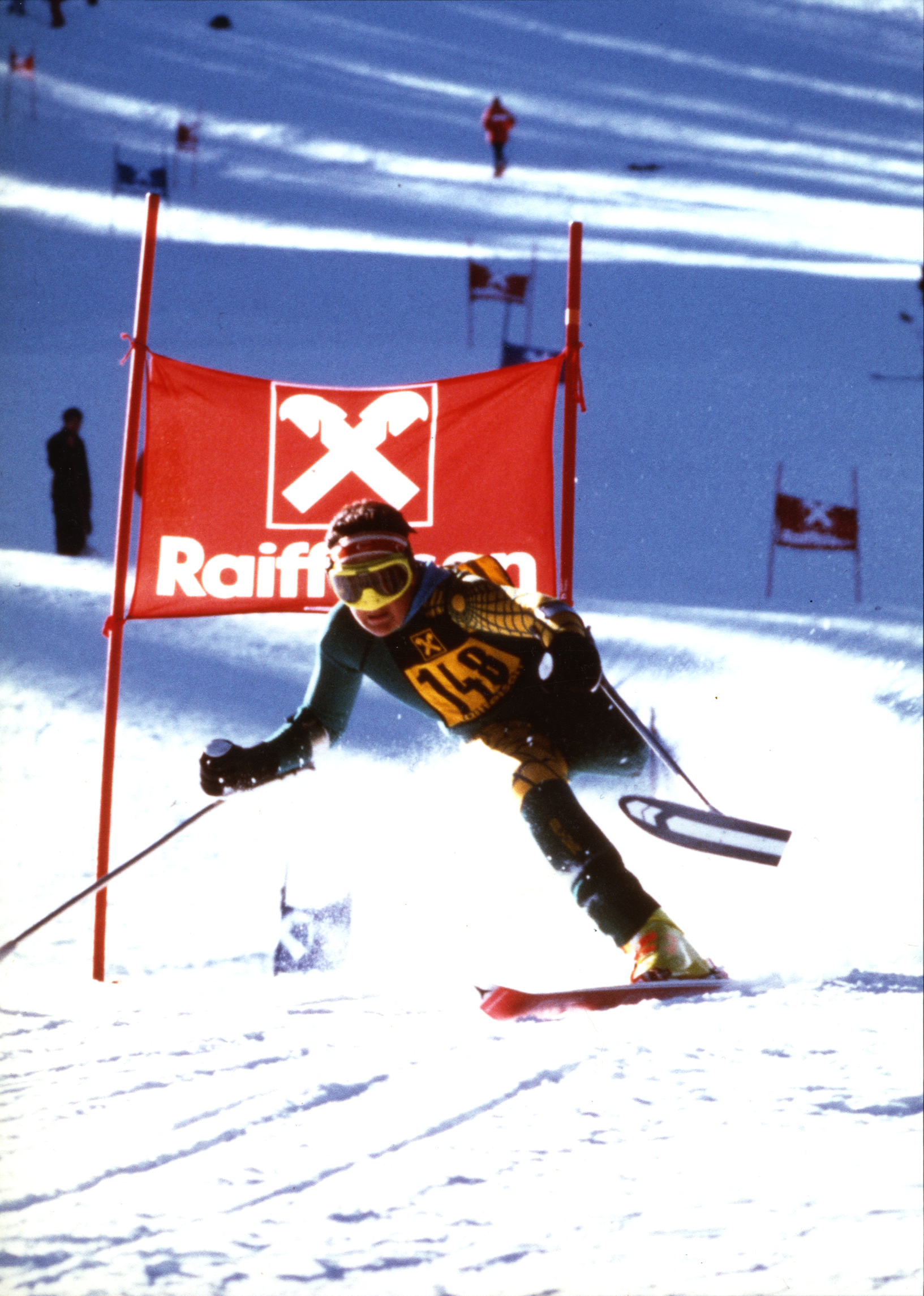
Michael Milton during one of his Slalom runs

Michael Milton won a gold medal in the men's slalom LW2 event, for which he received a Medal of the Order of Australia, and a silver medal in the men's Super-G LW2 event. He became the first Australian to win a gold medal at a winter Olympics or Paralympics. That year he also won the slalom in the Austrian championships, and in 1993 he won both the slalom and super giant slalom at the Columbia Crest Cup.

Michael Norton won a bronze medal for his efforts in the men's slalom LW11

David Munk also won a bronze medal for his Men's Super-G LW11 run

== Medal winners ==
Medal	Name	Sport	Event
Gold	Michael Milton	Alpine skiing	Men's slalom LW2
Silver	Michael Milton	Alpine skiing	Men's Super-G LW2
Bronze	Michael Norton	Alpine skiing	Men's slalom LW11
Bronze	David Munk	Alpine skiing	Men's Super-G LW11

== Administration ==
Team officials were:

Graeme Morris (Manager/Head Coach);

Dean Sheppard (assistant coach);

Eddie Jesiolowski, David Howells and Alan Dean (Team Assistants)

== Events ==
The 5 athletes who competed at these Games were involved in 4 of the 5 available alpine skiing events. These events were: Downhill, slalom, giant slalom and super-G. The only alpine skiing event that no Australian participated in was Super Combined. A short description of these events are as follows:

=== Downhill ===
- Each athlete competes one run down the course with their finish time determining the final order based on ascending time. Athletes ski down a long, steep course and must pass through a relatively few number of gates. If an athlete misses a gate they are disqualified. For weather, safety and other reasons, the jury can decide to have two-run downhill if the vertical drop does not comply.

=== Slalom ===
- Each athlete competes two runs on the same day on different courses. Times from the two runs are added together to determine the final order based on ascending total time. It is a technical event over a shorter course than other events but with a high number of gates that the athlete must negotiate. If an athlete misses a gate they are disqualified.

=== Giant slalom ===
- Each athlete completes two runs on the same day on different courses. Times from the two runs are added together to determine the final order based on ascending total time. It is a technical event with a longer course and fewer gates than the slalom. The number of gates is determined by the vertical drop of the course. If an athlete misses a gate they are disqualified.

=== Super-G ===
- A speed event where each athlete completes one run down the course with their finish time determining the final order based on ascending time. The course is generally shorter than downhill but longer than slalom and giant slalom.

=== Super combined ===
- A combined competition which represents the final result of two disciplines - usually one of either a downhill or super-G and a single run of slalom. Each athlete competes two runs on the same day on different courses. Times from the two runs are added together to determine the final order based on ascending total time.

== Classifications ==
=== Standing skiers ===
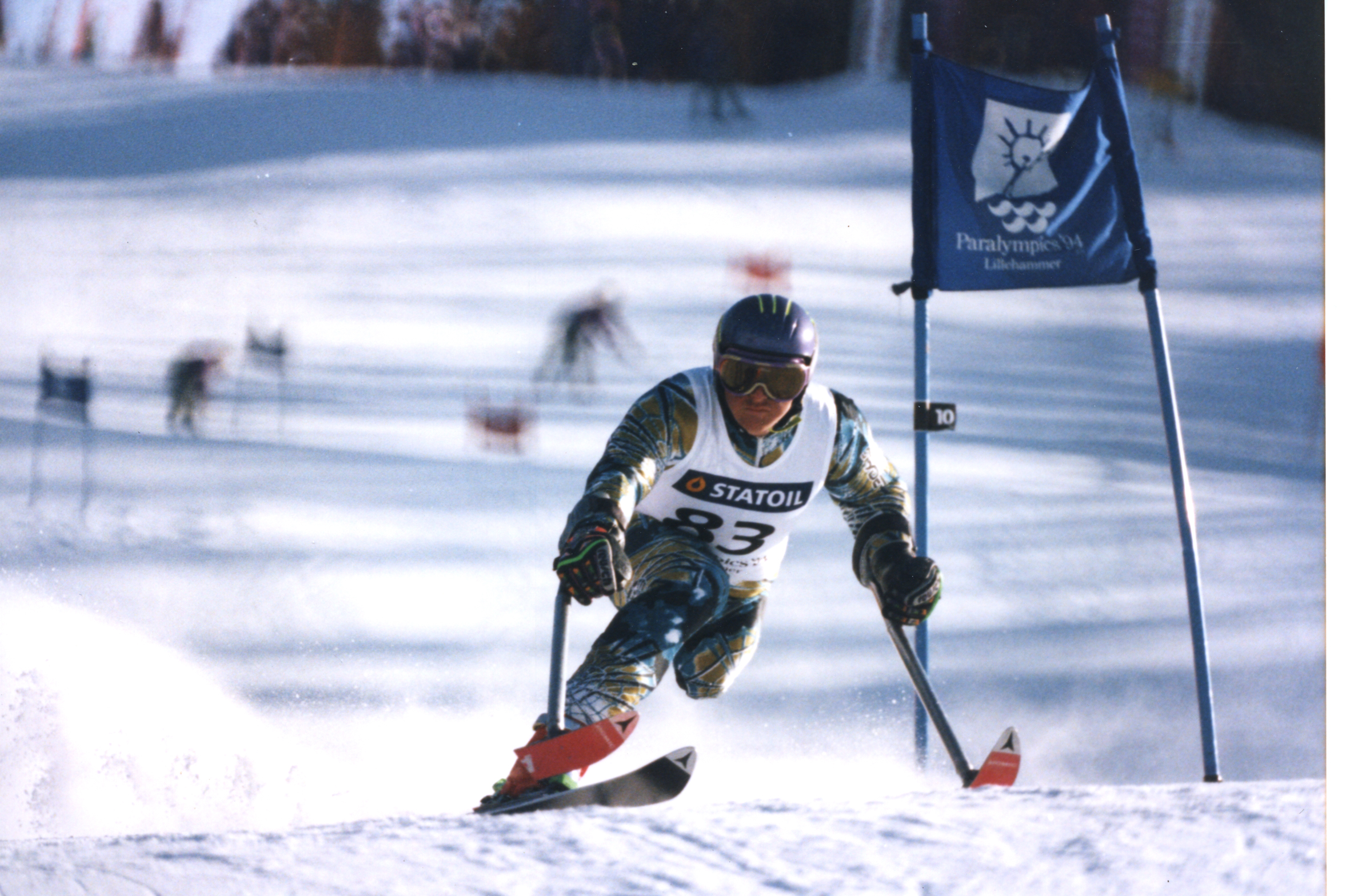
Example of standing skiing by Michael Milton

- LW1 - standing: double leg amputation above the knee
- LW2 - standing: single leg amputation above the knee
- LW3 - standing: double leg amputation below the knee, mild cerebral palsy, or equivalent impairment
- LW4 - standing: single leg amputation below the knee
- LW5/7 - standing: double arm amputation
- LW6/8 - standing: single arm amputation
- LW9 - standing: amputation or equivalent impairment of one arm and one leg

=== Sitting skiers ===
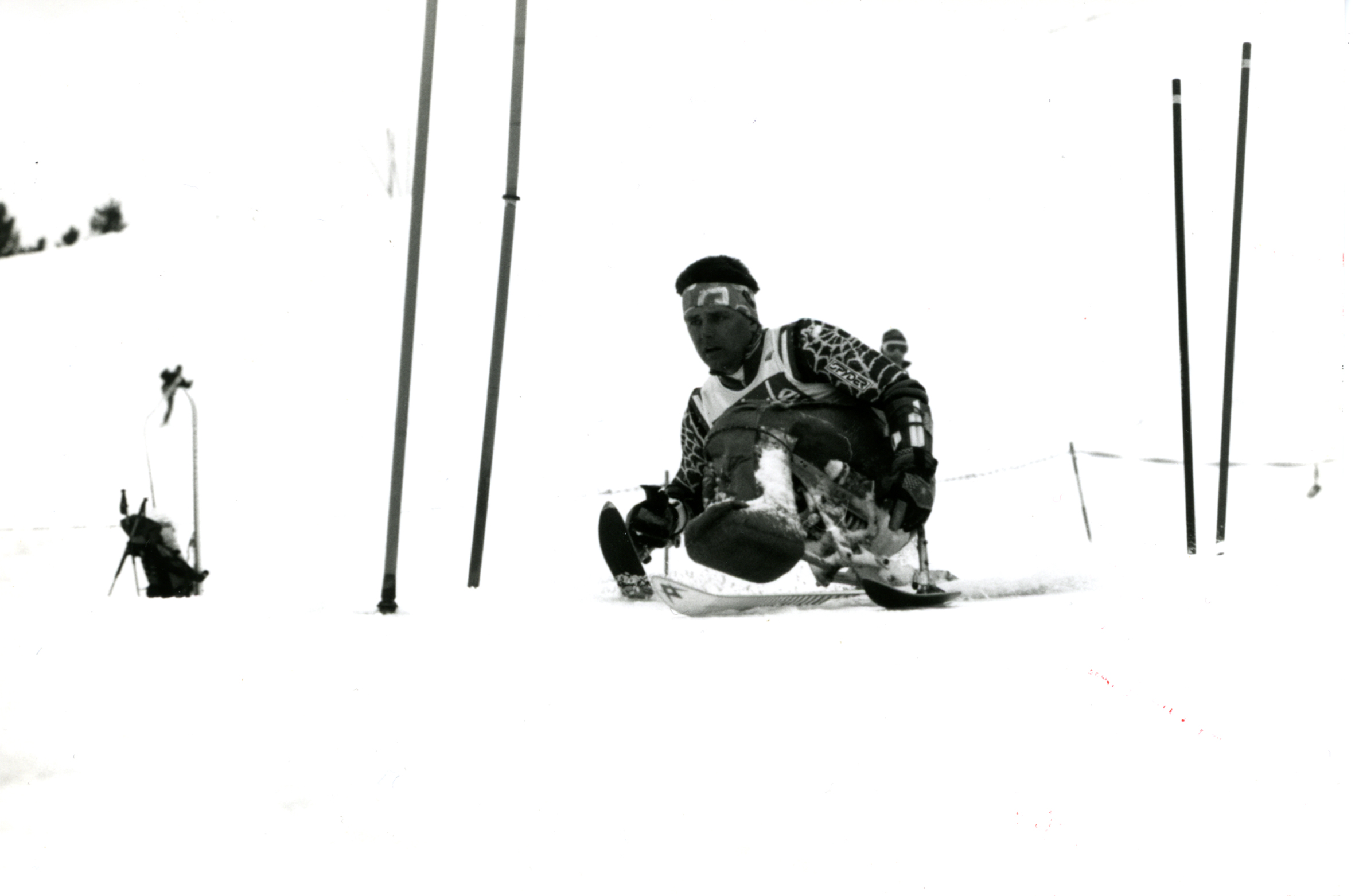
Example of sit skiing by Michael Norton

- LW10 - sitting: paraplegia with no or some upper abdominal function and no functional sitting balance
- LW11 - sitting: paraplegia with fair functional sitting balance
- LW12 - sitting: double leg amputation above the knees, or paraplegia with some leg function and good sitting balance

=== Visual impairments ===
- B1 - visually impaired: no functional vision
- B2 - visually impaired: up to ca 3-5% functional vision
- B3 - visually impaired: under 10% functional vision

In IPC alpine skiing, you will see athletes with visual impairment skiing with a guide. The guide skis in front of the athlete and verbally gives directions to the athlete.

== Results ==
Athlete	Event	Time	Rank
Kyrra Grunnsund	Men's giant slalom LW4	2:28.29	7
Kyrra Grunnsund	Men's slalom LW4	1:25.50	8
Rod Hacon	Men's giant slalom LW11	DNF	
Rod Hacon	Men's slalom LW11	DNF	
Michael Milton	Men's Downhill LW2	1:17.39	7
Michael Milton	Men's giant slalom LW2	2:28.15	4
Michael Milton	Men's slalom LW2	1:14.11	1st place, gold medalist(s)
Michael Milton	Men's Super-G LW2	1:26.62	2nd place, silver medalist(s)
David Munk	Men's Downhill LW11	DNF	
David Munk	Men's giant slalom LW11	DNF	
David Munk	Men's Super-G LW11	1:39.67	3rd place, bronze medalist(s)
Michael Norton	Men's Downhill LW11	DNF	
Michael Norton	Men's slalom LW11	1:55.68	3rd place, bronze medalist(s)

David McPherson a sit skier was forced top withdraw from the team prior to Games due to a fall in Thredbo, New South Wales in September 1991.

== See also ==
- Australia at the Winter Paralympics
- 1992 Winter Paralympics
- Australia at the 1992 Summer Paralympics
