= Australia at the Winter Paralympics =

Australia at the Paralympics
- IPC code: AUS
- NPC: Australian Paralympic Committee
- Website: www.paralympic.org.au
- Medals: Gold 12 Silver 6 Bronze 14 Total 32

Summer appearances
- 1960; 1964; 1968; 1972; 1976; 1980; 1984; 1988; 1992; 1996; 2000; 2004; 2008; 2012; 2016; 2020; 2024

Winter appearances
- 1976; 1980; 1984; 1988; 1992; 1994; 1998; 2002; 2006; 2010; 2014; 2018; 2022; 2026

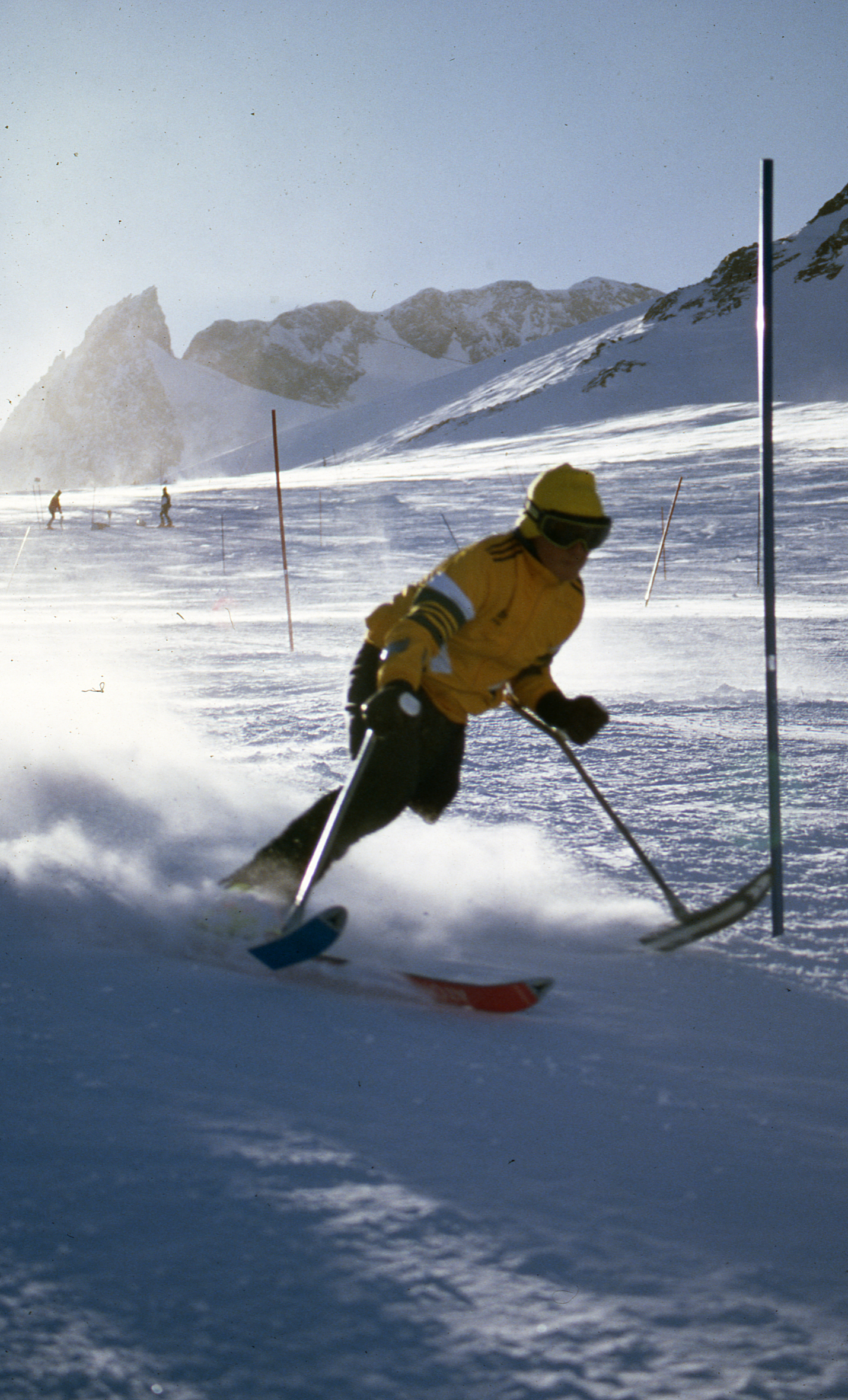
Australian at the 1988 Paralympics

Australia has competed in every Winter Paralympics. In 1976, the first Games, Australia's sole competitor was Ron Finneran, but he was not an official entrant. In 1980, Kyrra Grunnsund and Peter Rickards became the first official competitors, in alpine and cross-country skiing. The number of Australian athletes increased to three, five, five and six at the next four games, respectively, and all of the athletes were alpine skiers. The participation decreased to four in 1998 and climbed back up to six in 2002. Australia won its first Winter Paralympic medals in 1992, and has medalled at every games since then. All of the medals have been won in alpine skiing and snowboarding.

Australia won four Winter Paralympic medals in 1992—one gold, a silver and two bronze. Michael Milton, an amputee alpine skier, won gold in slalom and silver in super-G. David Munk, a paraplegic sit-skier, won bronze in super-G. Michael Norton, a paraplegic sit-skier, won bronze in the downhill. In 1994, Australia won nine medals, three gold, two silver and four bronze. Milton won gold in the giant slalom, silver in slalom and bronze in downhill and super-G. Norton won gold in the slalom and super-G. James Patterson, a skier with cerebral palsy, won silver in downhill and bronze in giant slalom. Munk won bronze in giant slalom. Different disabilities have separate events, which is why Patterson and Munk both won bronze in giant slalom. In 1998, two medals were won, both by Paterson: gold in downhill and bronze in slalom.

In 2002, the medal haul was seven, consisting of six gold and one silver. Milton made a clean sweep, winning gold in the downhill, super-G, giant slalom and slalom. Bart Bunting, a vision-impaired skier guided by Nathan Chivers, won gold in the downhill and super-G, and silver in the giant slalom.

In 2006, Australia sent its first female Winter Paralympian, Emily Jansen, a below-knee amputee alpine skier. James Millar, who was born without his right forearm, competed in the cross-country and the biathlon, becoming the first Australian to compete in an event outside alpine skiing. Milton attended his last Paralympics. A target of two medals was set, which took into account the consolidation of disability classes. Australia met this target, with Milton winning silver in the downhill and Toby Kane winning bronze in super-G.

At the 2010 Vancouver Games, Jessica Gallagher became the first female Australian Paralympian to win a medal with a bronze medal in the Women's Vision-Impaired Slalom event.

== Summary ==
| Games | Gold | Silver | Bronze | Total | Rank | Competitors | Officials | Flag Bearer Opening | Flag Bearer Closing |
|---|---|---|---|---|---|---|---|---|---|
| 1980 Geilo | 0 | 0 | 0 | 0 | - | 2 | | | |
| 1984 Innsbruck | 0 | 0 | 0 | 0 | - | 3 | | | |
| 1988 Innsbruck | 0 | 0 | 0 | 0 | - | 5 | | | |
| 1992 Tignes-Albertville | 1 | 1 | 2 | 4 | 12 | 5 | | | |
| 1994 Lillehammer | 3 | 2 | 4 | 9 | 9 | 6 | | | |
| 1998 Nagano | 1 | 0 | 1 | 2 | 16 | 4 | | James Patterson | |
| 2002 Salt Lake City | 6 | 1 | 0 | 7 | 8 | 7 | | Michael Milton | Bart Bunting |
| 2006 Turin | 0 | 1 | 1 | 2 | 13 | 10 | | Michael Milton | Toby Kane |
| 2010 Vancouver | 0 | 1 | 3 | 4 | 16 | 12 | | Toby Kane | Cameron Rahles-Rahbula |
| 2014 Sochi | 0 | 0 | 2 | 2 | 19 | 11 | | Cameron Rahles-Rahbula | Ben Tudhope |
| 2018 Pyeongchang | 1 | 0 | 3 | 4 | 15 | 15 | | Joany Badenhorst | Melissa Perrine |
| 2022 Beijing | 0 | 0 | 1 | 1 | 9 | 17 | | Melissa Perrine; Mitchell Gourley | Ben Tudhope |
| 2026 Cortina | 0 | 1 | 1 | 2 | 21 | 14 | | Georgia Gunew; Ben Tudhope | Lauren Parker; Sean Pollard |
| Total | 12 | 7 | 18 | 37 | | | | | |

=== Australian Winter Paralympic medalists 1976–2026 ===
Updated after 2026 Games

| Athlete | Gold | Silver | Bronze | Total |
|---|---|---|---|---|
| Michael Milton | 6 | 3 | 2 | 11 |
| Bart Bunting/Nathan Chivers (Guide) | 2 | 1 | 0 | 3 |
| Michael Norton | 2 | 0 | 1 | 3 |
| James Patterson | 1 | 1 | 2 | 4 |
| Simon Patmore | 1 | 1 | 0 | 2 |
| Ben Tudhope | 0 | 1 | 2 | 3 |
| Marty Mayberry | 0 | 1 | 0 | 1 |
| David Munk | 0 | 0 | 2 | 2 |
| Cameron Rahles-Rahbula | 0 | 0 | 2 | 2 |
| Toby Kane | 0 | 0 | 2 | 2 |
| Jessica Gallagher | 0 | 0 | 2 | 2 |
| Melissa Perrine | 0 | 0 | 2 | 2 |

== Training facility ==
The primary location for Australian-based training for the Winter Paralympians is in the Snowy Mountains at Thredbo and Perisher. There is a facility called the Jindabyne Winter Academy of Sport where the athletes train. When they are actively training, they may be skiing by 6am and doing conditioning in other sports during the afternoon.

== Athlete support ==
In 1993, Michael Milton was the first Winter Paralympian to receive a scholarship from the Australian Institute of Sport (AIS). In 2001, the AIS and Australian Paralympic Committee formally established a skiing program for athletes with a disability. All Australian Winter Paralympic Games medals have been won by AIS scholarship holders. AIS athletes receive access to training camps, support for international training and competition, strength and conditioning, sports medicine and psychology services. New South Wales Institute of Sport and the Victorian Institute of Sport offer assistance to Paralympic alpine skiers. The Australian Paralympic Committee supports three Winter Paralympic disciplines - alpine skiing, cross-country skiing and para-snowboard through the delivery of the Paralympic Preparation Program (PPP).
