= Australia at the 1998 Winter Paralympics =

- IPC code: AUS
- NPC: Australian Paralympic Committee
- Website: www.paralympic.org.au

in Nagano
- Competitors: 4 in 1 sport
- Flag bearer: James Paterson (Opening)
- Medals Ranked 16th: Gold 1 Silver 0 Bronze 1 Total 2

Winter Paralympics appearances (overview)
- 1976; 1980; 1984; 1988; 1992; 1994; 1998; 2002; 2006; 2010; 2014; 2018; 2022; 2026

The 1998 Winter Paralympics were held in Nagano, Japan from 5–14 March 1998. At the Games, Australia was represented by four male alpine skiers. Australia tied for 16th place with Denmark, out of 21 Nations on the overall medal tally. James Patterson, an LW9 standing skier, won Australia's two medals - one gold and one bronze.

After performances at the Nagano 1998 Winter Paralympic Games, together with several world championships, Australia's reputation as a leading Paralympic nation increased considerably.

== Background of Nagano Paralympics ==
The 1998 Winter Paralympics were held alongside the 1998 Winter Olympics in Nagano. This was the first Paralympic Winter Games to be held outside of Europe. This was the highest number of athletes competing at any Winter Paralympics.

The games consisted of four sports: alpine skiing, ice sledge, hockey and Nordic skiing/cross country. Australia competed in alpine skiing. The Australian Nordic skier, Colin Scott, did not succeed in making the selection.

| Host City | Nagano, Japan |
| Dates | 7 - 16 March 1998 |
| Countries | 31 |
| Athletes | 562 |
| Men | 440 |
| Women | 122 |
| Australia | 4 |
| Medal events | 34 |
| Sports | 5 |
Spectators
| Most Medals (athlete) | Frank Hoefle (GER) 5 medals |
| Most Medals (athlete) | Ragnhild Myklebust (NOR) 5 medals |

== The Team ==
Members of the 1998 Australian Winter Paralympic Team were nominated after a series of dry-land and on-snow training camps, and competition at the Disabled Winter Sport Australia Nationals held in Mt. Hotham, Victoria. Because of poor snow conditions during the Australian winter, this made the selection and preparations difficult. The selection of the team was based on results from the Australian National Championships, which were held in August. All athletes had to satisfy a requirement to be selected, by attaining times equal to or better than the eight place-getter in the 1996 World Championships in their respective class. The final selection were hold in North America, with trials in January.

The team originally consisted of six alpine skiers, which included James Paterson, Matthew Nicholls, Alistair Mars, David Munk, Rod Hacon and Anthony Bonaccurso. The team consisted of a blend of experienced skiers such as James Patterson, Rod Hacon and David Munk, who were all experienced Paralympic athletes, while the three others were new to the team. Together as a team, they wanted to repeat the outstanding success of the Australian team in Lillehammer in 1994.

The team were reduced after Michael Milton's retirement, and Michael Norton's death. The loss of the two athletes from the team left a big hole in Alpine skiing in Australia. Because of this, it was therefore a huge disappointment for the Australian winter Paralympics team when both Rod Hacon and David Munk had to withdraw before the 1998 Winter Paralympics even started.

The team was supported by national head coach Steve Bova and managed by Commander Adrian Pay (RAN).

| Athlete | Classification | Events | Previous Games | Competitive Status |
|---|---|---|---|---|
| Anthony Bonaccurso | LW11 | Men's Giant Slalom LW11 Men's Slalom LW11 Men's Super-G LW11 | ☢ | Competed |
| Rod Hacon | LW11/LWXII | Did not compete - Injury | 1992 Tignes-Albertville 1994 Lillehammer | Withdrew - injury |
| David Munk | LW11/LWXII | Did not compete - Illness | 1988 Innsbruck 1992 Tignes-Albertville 1994 Lillehammer | Withdrew - illness |
| Matthew Shane Nicholls | LW5/7 | Men's Downhill LW1,3,5/7,9 Men's Giant Slalom LW1,3,5/7 Men's Slalom LW6/8 Men's Super-G LW1,3,5/7 | Nil | Competed |
| James Lawrence Paterson | LW9 | Men's Giant Slalom LW9 Men's Super-G LW9 Men's Slalom LW9 Men's Downhill LW1,3,5/7,9 | 1994 Lillehammer | Competed |
| Alastair Mars | LW6/8 | Men's Downhill LW6/8 Men's Giant Slalom LW6/8 Men's Slalom LW6/8 Men's Super-G LW6/8 | Nil | Competed |

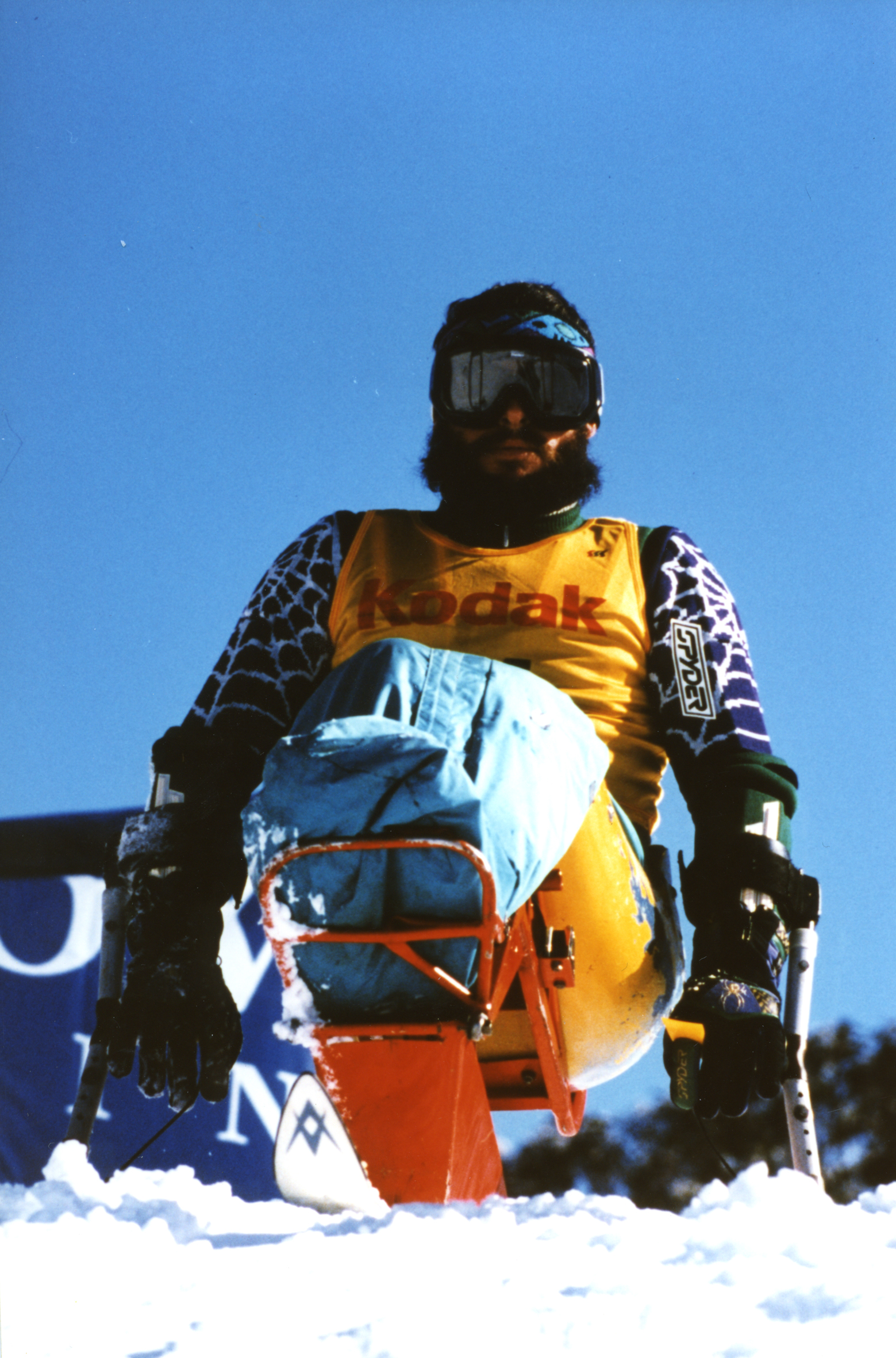
Rod Hacon, forced to withdraw from Nagano Paralympics due to hand injury

== Notable Team Members ==
James Patterson was born in Terrigal, in New South Wales, and diagnosed with cerebral palsy. He was working as a marine mechanic for Halvorsen Boats. They supported his preparation overseas before the 1994 Games, and the 1998 Games. Along with competing at the 1998 Winter Paralympics, he also competed at the 1994 Winter Paralympics. At the 1996 IPC Alpine Skiing World Championships, he won a silver medal and two bronze medals. As a representative for Australia at the 1998 Winter Paralympics, where he was team captain, he competed in four events. Winning a gold medal in the Men's Downhill LW9, and a bronze medal in the Men's Slalom LW9. He also went on to win a silver medal at the 2000 IPC Alpine Skiing World Championships in the Men's Giant Slalom LW9. When both Munk and Hacon had to withdraw, it was important for the Australian team that an experienced skier could take the responsibility as the team captain. Later James Paterson was awarded Order of Australia in recognition for being a medallist at Paralympics, and in the Disabled World Ski Championships. He also received an Australian Sports Medal because of his great performances.

== Games preparation ==
As a part of making the team perform their very best, the aim of the revised 1997–2000 Paralympic Preparation Program was to provide Australia's Paralympic Athletes with the support and help needed, to reach their full potential at the 1998 Nagano and 2000 Sydney Paralympic Games.

The plan was that the team should be headed by the experienced Chef de Mission Nick Dean, and General manager Adrian Pay.

The Winter Paralympics team did not have a coach at all until a couple of months before the Games. The team finally got the Canadian Steve Bova as their coach, who did a great job in such a short time.

The Australian's began their team training in unsympathetic Australian ski conditions. Once the Australian ski fields proved inadequate for training the team travelled to the northern hemisphere, where they spent a significant amount of time training and acclimatizing prior to the Nagano Paralympics. The team went to Japan in February, directly after the final selection in North America, as a part of the acclimatizing. The acclimatizing was necessary because the Winter Paralympic Games are out of season for Australians. With Steve Bova as the Coach, the team embarked on an intensive pre-games program.

=== Withdrawals ===
It was during this time that both Rod Hacon and David Munk were forced to withdraw from the Australian team. Munk became seriously ill with a kidney infection and Hacon suffered a freak accident, whilst carrying his ski, severely damaging his hand. The injury required surgery and ongoing treatment. Consequently, both experienced Paralympic campaigners withdrew from the team prior to the Games. This was a significant blow for the Australian team as they lost two of their most experienced Paralympians who were both well placed to medal at the Games. James Paterson was the only athlete left in the team with previous Paralympics experience. James Patterson was the team captain during the paralympics in Nagano. The Australian Winter Paralympic team was reduced to only four athletes, three of whom had never before competed at a Winter Paralympics.

Because of Hacons withdrawal from the games, he never got the chance to win a medal in the Winter Paralympics as a skier. He competed in the 1992 Winter Paralympics and at the 1994 Winter Paralympics in Lillehammer, which was his last Paralympics as a skier

David Munk achieved to get two bronze medals during his career, and had a great chance to achieve another medal at the 1998 Winter Paralympics, where he could not compete.

== Medalists ==
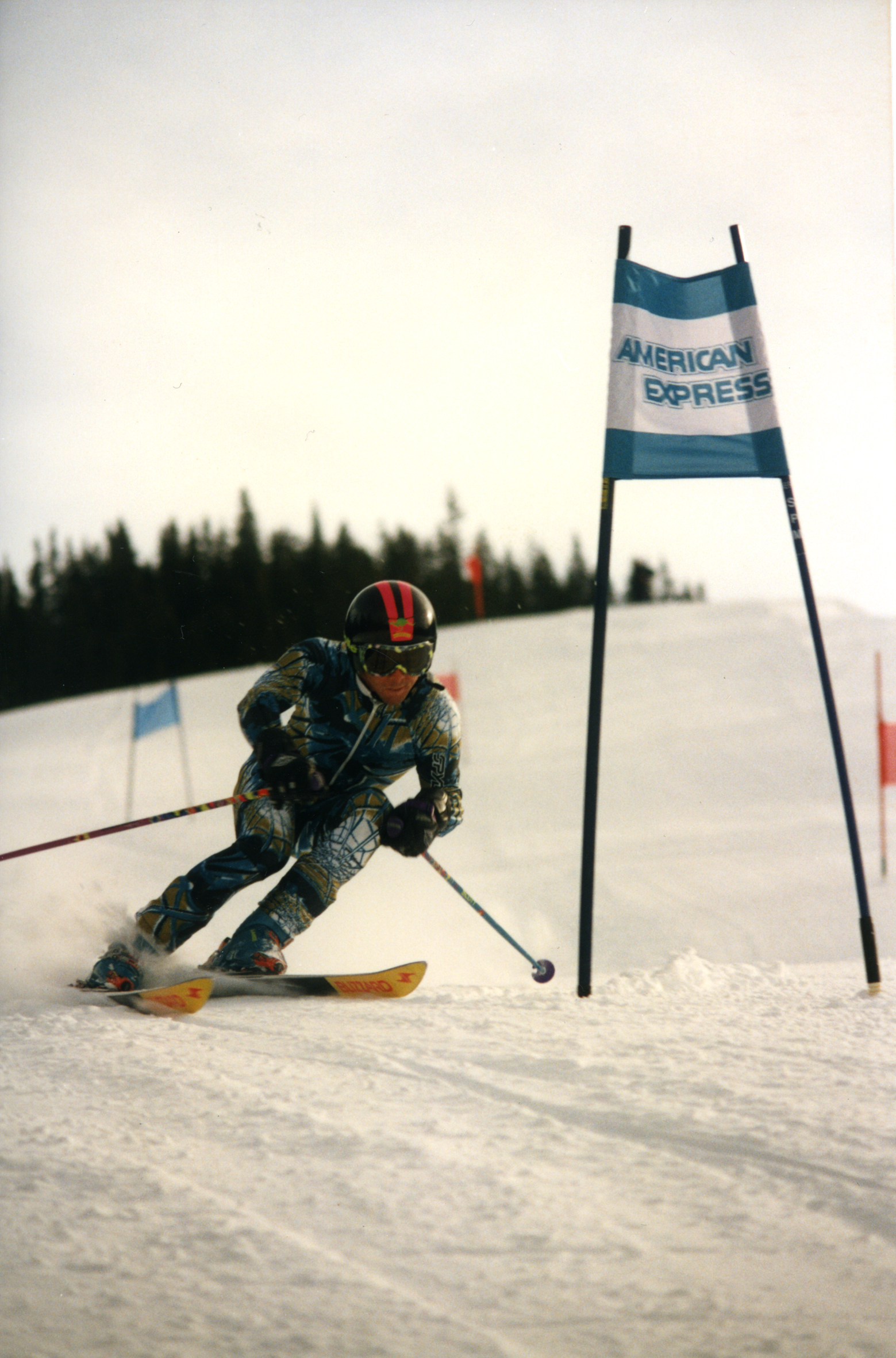
Australian Paralympic skier James Patterson at 1994 Paralympic Games

| Medal | Name | Sport | Event |
|---|---|---|---|
| Gold | James Paterson | Alpine Skiing | Men's Downhill LW1,3,5/7,9 |
| Bronze | James Paterson | Alpine Skiing | Men's Slalom LW9 |

James Paterson performed strongly in the blue-ribbon event, the Men's Downhill and eclipsed the opposition, beating New Zealander Mathew Butson to the gold medal by over a second. After two bad races in the Giant Slalom and Super G, Patterson fought back to claim bronze in the Slalom LW9.

== Results ==
The Winter team performed admirably, even though there were difficult circumstances. The team of six reduced to four competitors were a part of the difficult situation. Even though such a small team represented Australia, the achievements were great to the numbers of participants from Australia.

The Australian team competed in alpine skiing, which involved the four events downhill, super giant slalom, super slalom and slalom. The Australian team achieved one gold medal, and one bronze medal, won by James Patterson. This was a decline from previous paralympics, but due to the withdrawal of Hacon and Munk, who were both big medal hopes, this was a great achievement by the Australian team.

=== Cross-country skiing ===
The Australian cross country athlete, Colin Scott, from Melbourne, failed to make the selection. This was despite every effort and considerable personal sacrifice.

=== Alpine skiing ===
Until 1998, alpine events were only for the athletes participating in the standing classes, but in Nagano Mono-skiing, for seated skiers, became a medal event together with the other classes. The other classes consisted of athletes with vision impairment, limb loss, cerebral palsy or acquired brain injury etc.

==== Men ====
Anthony Bonaccurso ended on 17th place out of 27 competitors in the Men's Slalom LW11, where 10 of the competitors did not finish. The participants in the Men's Slalom LW11 was from 11 different countries, and the majority were from Austria with 6 participants. Juergen Egle from Austria took the gold medal. In Men's Giant Slalom LW11 there were 27 participants in the final round, also from 11 different countries. 14 of the 27 participants did not finish the race, including Anthony Bonaccurso. In Men's Super-G LW11 final there were 25 participants, with Anthony ending on 20th.

In Men's Downhill LW1,3,5/7,9 final there were 15 participants from 10 different countries, both Matthew Shane Nicholls and James Paterson participated in the final. James Paterson won a gold medal, while Matthew Nicholls ended on 10th. Further, Nicholls ended on 6th place in Men's Giant Slalom LW1, as his best result.

Paterson's gold medal was the only one James Patterson achieved during his career. The winter paralympics in Nagano was also his last winter paralympics. This gold medal was not only Patterson's victory, but very much the team's victory where all the team members shared the success.

Alistar Mars was one of the newcomers, and his best result was 16th place in the Men's Downhill LW6/8.

| Athlete | Event | Time | Factor % | Calculated Factor | Rank |
|---|---|---|---|---|---|
| Anthony Bonaccurso | Men's Giant Slalom LW11 | DNF | - | - | - |
| Anthony Bonaccurso | Men's Slalom LW11 | 2:57.26 | 72.63033 | 2:08.74 | 17 |
| Anthony Bonaccurso | Men's Super-G LW11 | 2:07.03 | 83.15137 | 1:45.62 | 20 |
| Matthew Shane Nicholls | Men's Downhill LW1,3,5/7,9 | 1:27.83 | 97.64023 | 1:25.75 | 10 |
| Matthew Shane Nicholls | Men's Giant Slalom LW1,3,5/7 | 3:20.93 | 98.77309 | 3:18.46 | 6 |
| Matthew Shane Nicholls | Men's Slalom LW6/8 | DNF | - | - | - |
| Matthew Shane Nicholls | Men's Super-G LW1,3,5/7 | 1:39.37 | 99.03576 | 1:38.41 | 11 |
| James Paterson | Men's Giant Slalom LW9 | 3:07.42 | 90.84983 | 2:50.27 | 4 |
| James Paterson | Men's Super-G LW9 | DSQ | - | - | - |
| James Paterson | Men's Slalom LW9 | 2:08.01 | 88.6755 | 1:53.51 | 3rd place, bronze medalist(s) |
| James Paterson | Men's Downhill LW1,3,5/7,9 | 1:10.10 | 95.92812 | 1:07.24 | 1st place, gold medalist(s) |
| Alastair Mars | Men's Downhill LW6/8 | 1:12.65 | 100 | 1:12.65 | 16 |
| Alastair Mars | Men's Giant Slalom LW6/8 | DSQ | - | - | - |
| Alastair Mars | Men's Slalom LW6/8 | DNF | - | - | - |
| Alastair Mars | Men's Super-G LW6/8 | 1:23.64 | 100 | 1:23.64 | 20 |

== Medal table ==
Australia finished equal 16th (with Denmark) of 21 Nations on the overall medal table. This was lower than the previous two Winter Paralympic games. Australia finished ninth on the table in Lillehammer four years prior (nine medals - three gold, two silver and four bronze) and twelfth in Albertville in 1992 (four medals - one gold, one silver and two bronze).

Map of countries participating in the 1998 Winter Paralympics. Blue = Countries participating for the first time, Green = Countries who have previously participated in a Winter Paralympics, Yellow Square = Host City, Nagano, Japan.

| Rank | Country | | Gold | Silver | Bronze | Total |
|---|---|---|---|---|---|---|
| 1 | Norway | | 18 | 9 | 13 | 40 |
| 2 | Germany | | 14 | 17 | 13 | 44 |
| 3 | United States of America | | 13 | 8 | 13 | 34 |
| 4 | Japan | | 12 | 16 | 13 | 41 |
| 5 | Russia | | 12 | 10 | 9 | 31 |
| 6 | Switzerland | Switzerland within 2to3 | 10 | 5 | 8 | 23 |
| 7 | Spain | | 8 | 0 | 0 | 8 |
| 8 | Austria | | 7 | 16 | 11 | 34 |
| 9 | Finland | | 7 | 5 | 7 | 19 |
| 10 | France | | 5 | 9 | 8 | 22 |
| 11 | New Zealand | | 4 | 1 | 1 | 6 |
| 12 | Italy | | 3 | 4 | 3 | 10 |
| 13 | Czech Republic | | 3 | 3 | 1 | 7 |
| 14 | Ukraine | | 3 | 2 | 4 | 9 |
| 15 | Canada | | 1 | 9 | 5 | 15 |
| 16 | Australia | | 1 | 0 | 1 | 2 |
| 16 | Denmark | | 1 | 0 | 1 | 2 |

== Impact ==
At the conclusion of the games, the Australian Paralympic Committee learned that there was a need for a more structured program. This was necessary to prepare the winter athletes, and to have a permanent coach to work with the team through the preparation time from the very beginning.

The Australian Paralympic Committee developed a plan to improve Australia's medal count at the Winter Paralympic Games. The entire winter program was reviewed resulting in a focus on talent identification, continuity of coaching and ongoing, well structured training . A year-round training program was developed to improve physical conditioning for skiing athletes. Funding was secured from the Australian Paralympic Committee, the Australian Sports Commission, and the New South Wales Department of Sport and Recreation.

Ron Finneran of WinterSport Australia did a major push to help insure the success of this program. He helped to bring Perisher Blue and Thredbo, two Australian ski resorts, on board to provide training venues, access and support to Australian Paralympic skiers.

With a generous financial assistance from the Federal Government, an appointment with the Canadian Coach Steve Bova is now secured. For thought to future Paralympics, a formal program will now be implemented with a view to increased success in the 2002 Winter Games. The program is an initiative of Disabled Winter Sport Australia, the NSW Winter Academy of Sport and the APC. Head coach Bova worked closely with the Disabled WinterSport Australia together with Ron Finneran and the Brendan Flynn, the Australian Paralympic Committee General Manager Sport. Bova continued as the coach because of the great achievements the team reached despite the short time he had with the team. Bova, Finneran and Flynn planned new and higher goals, to ensure the success would continue at the next Winter Paralympic Games.

== See also ==
- Australia at the Winter Paralympics
- 1998 Winter Paralympics
- James Paterson
- David Munk
- Alpine Skiing at the 1998 Winter Paralympics
