= Australia at the 1988 Winter Paralympics =

- IPC code: AUS
- NPC: Australian Paralympic Committee
- Website: www.paralympic.org.au

in Innsbruck
- Competitors: 5 in 1 sport
- Medals: Gold 0 Silver 0 Bronze 0 Total 0

Winter Paralympics appearances (overview)
- 1976; 1980; 1984; 1988; 1992; 1994; 1998; 2002; 2006; 2010; 2014; 2018; 2022; 2026

Australia sent a delegation to compete at the 1988 Winter Paralympics in Innsbruck, Austria, which was held between 17–24 January 1988. This marked the nation's fourth appearance at the Winter Paralympics. The delegation sent a group of five alpine skiers as they wouldn't get a medal in these games.

== Athletes ==
Hans Hinterholzer and Jamie Milner were the two team coaches for the Australian Alpine skiing events at the Innsbruck Paralympics. Australia was fortunate effort to take 5 Paralympic athletes to represent Australia in the 1988 Games in Innsbruck. Each athlete who competed did not qualify for a medal at these games. Four out of five of the Australian athletes competed in the Men's Downhill, Men's Giant Slalom and Men's Slalom apart from David Munk who only participated in the Men's Giant Slalom and Men's Slalom. Each athlete had different classifications ranging from upper body disabilities to lower body disabilities. All classifications of every athlete competing in the Paralympic Games of any sort are done so by the International Paralympic Committee (IPC).

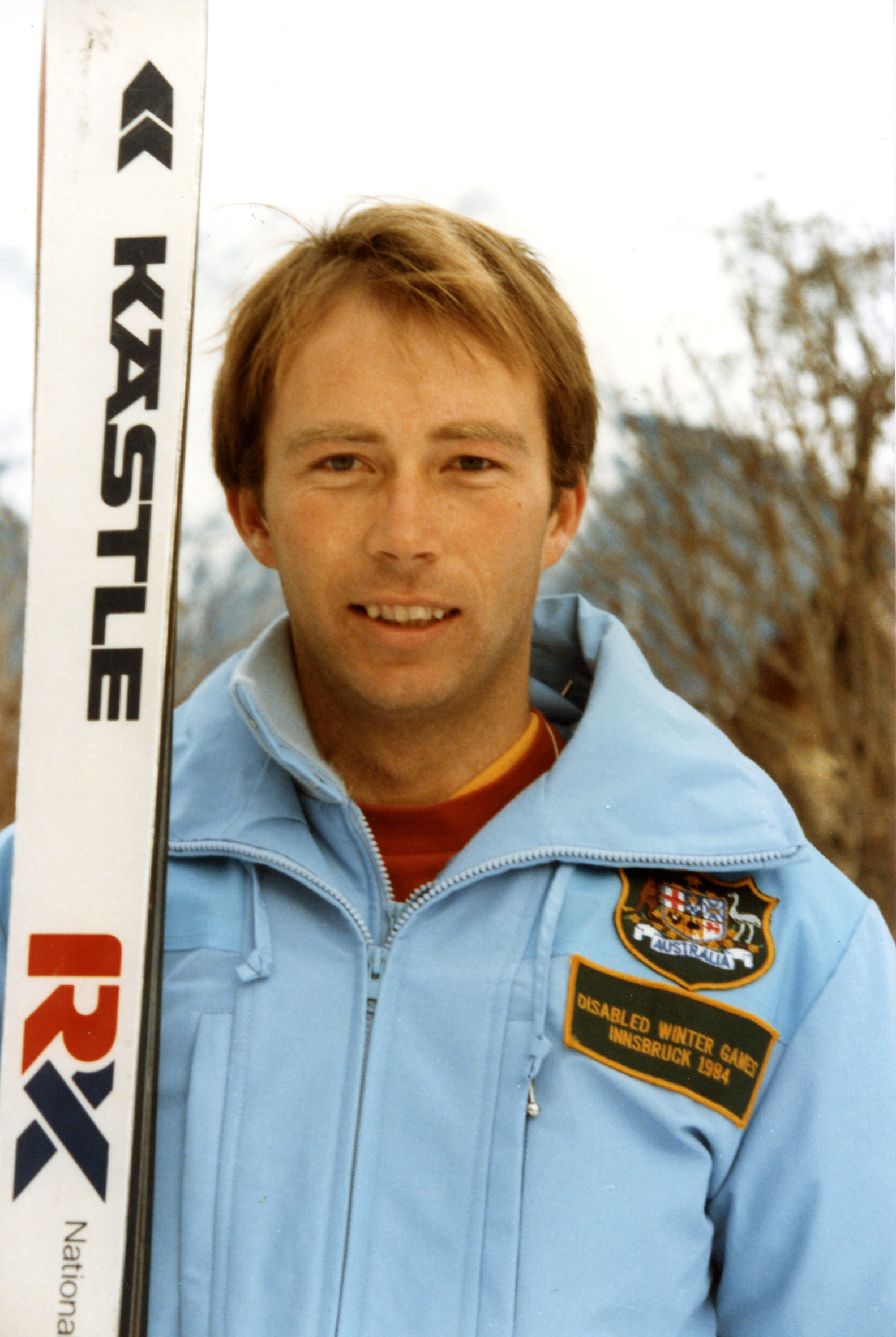
Kyrra Grunnsund- Australian Athlete in the Innsbruck Winter Paralympic Games

Michael Collins participated in the Men's Downhill LW6/8, Men's Giant Slalom LW6/8 and Men's Slalom. He was ranked 10 out of 23 athletes with a time of 1:18.86 in the Men's Downhill LW6/8. In the Men's Giant Slalom LW6/8 and the Men's Slalom Collins was unable to finish. Michael Collins was classed as an athlete who had upper extremity issues. This can range from a skier being classified in the LW6/8 category if they have paralysis, motor paresis affecting one arm or a single upper arm amputation.

Kyrra Grunnsund represented Australia in five Paralympics. He was the first Australian to compete at both the Summer and Winter Paralympics. He competed in both the Alpine and Cross-country skiing over the course of his career but in the 1988 Winter Paralympic Games he only competed in the Men's Downhill LW4, Men's Giant Slalom LW4 and Men's Slalom LW4. He ranked 13th out of 14 athletes in the Men's Downhill LW4 with a time of 1:19.78. In the Men's Giant Slalom LW4 and Men's Slalom LW4 he did not finish. Kyrra Grunnsund was classified as an athlete who had a disability in one lower extremity. He is a below-the-knee amputee and classed in the LW4 category for the Paralympics.

Evan Hodge competed in the 1988 men's Downhill LW2, Men's Giant Slalom LW2 and Men's Slalom. All three events he qualified and was ranked into the top 15 athletes. His best time was in the Men's Slalom LW2 with a time of 1:34.05 and was ranked 8th out of 33 competitors. Hodge was classified with having severe disability in a lower limb where an amputation or arthrodesis in the leg and hip. Specific skiing and training techniques have been developed for this LW2 skiers that address their disability type and equipment use. A factoring system is used in both para-alpine and para-Nordic to allow different classes to compete against each other when there are not many competitors in one class in a competition.

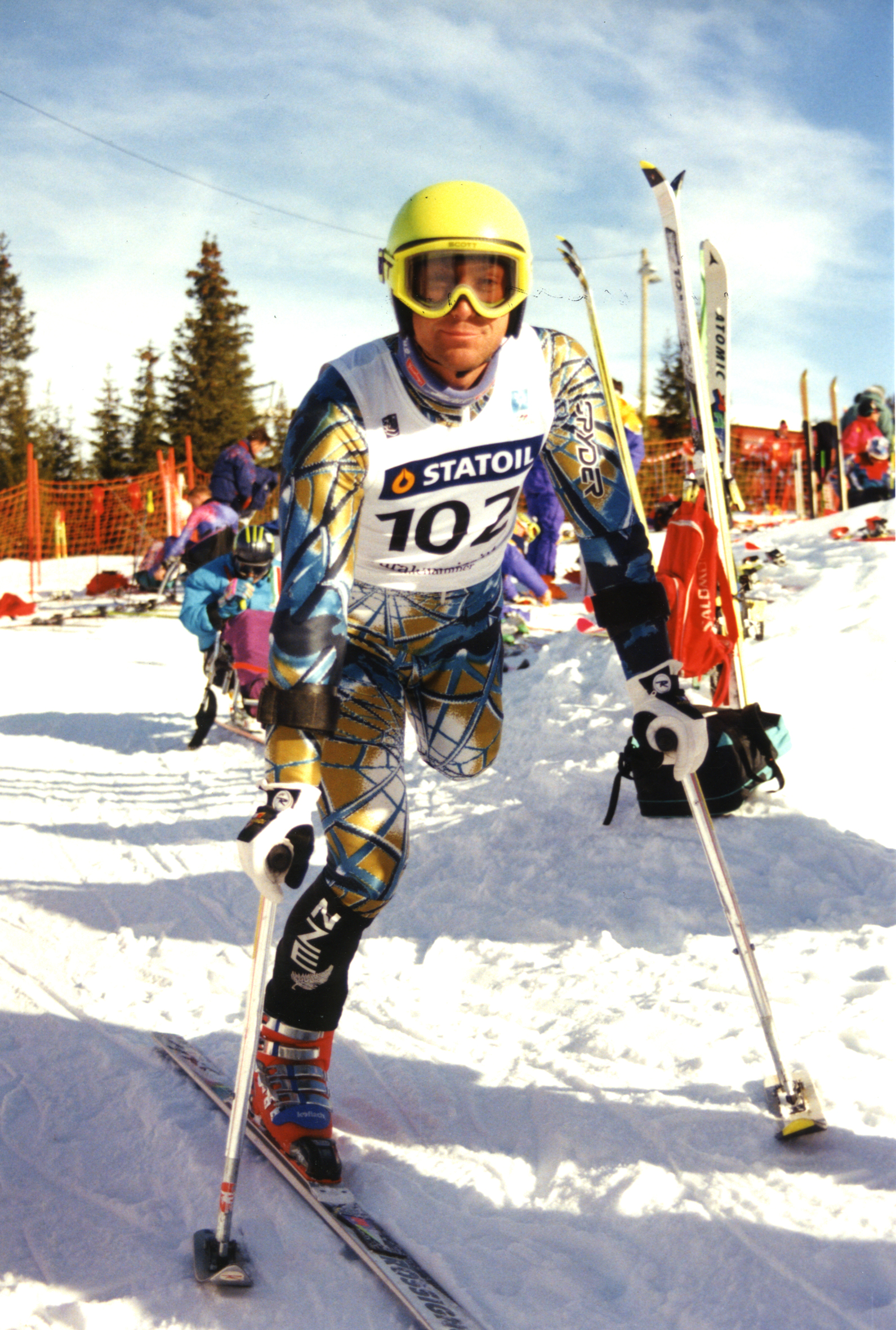
Michael Milton- Paralympic Australian Alpine skier

Michael Milton grew up in a skiing family. At the age of 9 years old, his left leg was amputated above the knee due to bone cancer. After having an amputation, he was more determined to be able to ski again. Milton debuted in the 1992 Tignes-Albertville Winter Paralympics and has an extensive career in both Summer and Winter Paralympic games. He did compete in the 1988 Innsbruck games but did not qualify for a medal in any of the events he competed in. His best ranked event in the 1988 Paralympics was in the Men's Giant Slalom LW2 where he was ranked 11th out of 33 competitors. Like teammate Hodge, Milton was classed in the LW2 category for the Winter Paralympic games.

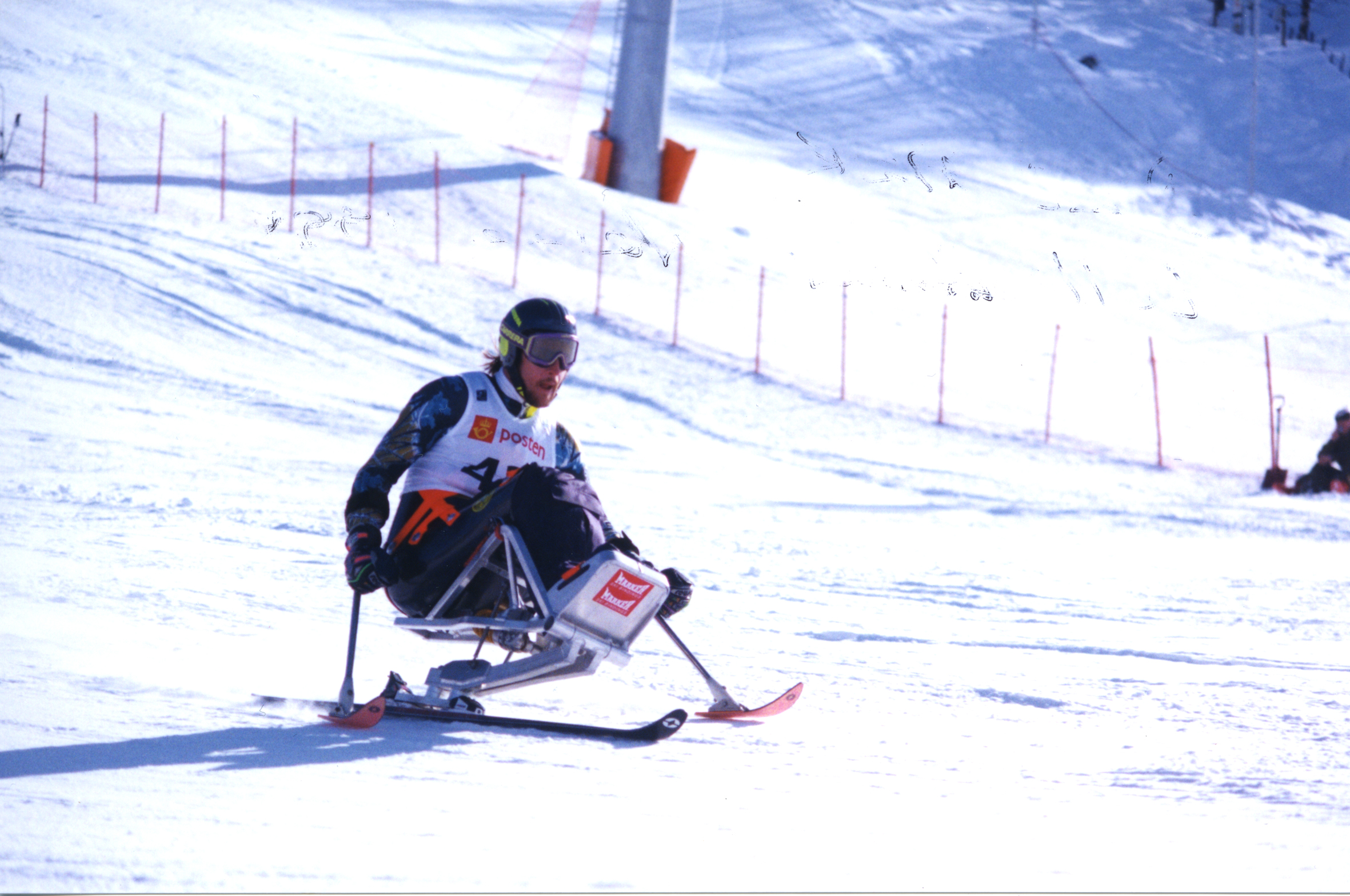
David Munk- Australian Paralympic Alpine Sit-Skier

David Munk is an Australian Paralympic Alpine sit skier. He debuted in the 1992 Winter Paralympics where he won a bronze medal in the Men's Super-G LW11. At the 1988 Winter Paralympics he was unfortunately disqualified from the Men's Giant Slalom LW10 but was able to rank 13th out of 29 competitors in the Men's Slalom LW10. He was classed in the LW10 category due to the little support he had when sitting up right. The International Paralympic Committee defined this para-alpine classification as; a disability in the lower limbs and no sitting balance. Athletes who were classed in this category were given physical equipment adapted to their specific needs.

== Administration ==
Team officials were:
Chef de Mission - Ron Finneran
Team Coaches: Hans Hinterholzer and Jamie Milner.

== Alpine skiing ==
Men

Athlete	Event	Time	Rank
Michael Collins	Men's Downhill LW6/8	1:18.86	10
Michael Collins	Men's Giant Slalom LW6/8		
Michael Collins	Men's Slalom		
Kyrra Grunnsund	Men's Downhill LW4	1:19.78	13
Kyrra Grunnsund	Men's Giant Slalom LW4	DNF	
Kyrra Grunnsund	Men's Slalom LW4	DNF	
Evan Hodge	Men's Downhill LW2	1:29.35	15
Evan Hodge	Men's Giant Slalom LW2	2:07.86	12
Evan Hodge	Men's Slalom LW2	1:34.05	8
Michael Milton	Men's Downhill LW2	1:29.35	15
Michael Milton	Men's Giant Slalom LW2	2:07.62	11
Michael Milton	Men's Slalom LW2	1:38.12	12
David Munk	Men's Giant Slalom LW10	DSQ	
David Munk	Men's Slalom LW10	2:26.54	13

== See also ==
- Australia at the Winter Paralympics
- Australia at the 1988 Summer Paralympics
- 1988 Winter Olympics
- 1988 Summer Paralympics
