= Australia at the 1980 Winter Paralympics =

- IPC code: AUS
- NPC: Australian Paralympic Committee
- Website: www.paralympic.org.au

in Geilo
- Competitors: 2 in 2 sports
- Medals: Gold 0 Silver 0 Bronze 0 Total 0

Winter Paralympics appearances (overview)
- 1976; 1980; 1984; 1988; 1992; 1994; 1998; 2002; 2006; 2010; 2014; 2018; 2022; 2026

Following the success of the first ever 1976 Winter Paralympics in Örnsköldsvik four years earlier, Norway was selected to host the Paralympic Games in 1980.

Amongst the 18 nations represented, the 1980 Winter Paralympics at Geilo was the first time Australia had sent an official team. These games were originally known as the 2nd Olympic Winter Games for Disabled.

Out of 299 participants (a 40% increase in participation in comparison to the first Paralympic Games), 229 men and 70 women, categorised into either amputees, blind/visually impaired and spinal cord injuries, competed in 63 events. Three sports were programmed to make up the 63 events in these games: alpine skiing, cross-country skiing, and ice sledge speed racing.

== Selection of Geilo ==
The selection of Geilo as the Host City was decided at a joint meeting of the International Stoke Mandeville Games Federation (ISMGF) and the International Sports Organisation for the Disabled (ISOD) in July 1977. This gave the city three years to prepare for the games to commence on 1 February 1980 for seven days to 7 February at Lake Placid.

== Logo ==
The logo for the Games included the Geilo city emblem at that time stylised with a snowflake held between the antlers of two reindeer facing each other.

The medal representing the 1980 Winter Paralympic Games featured a flaming torch overlapping the three interlocking wheels of the International Stoke Mandeville Wheelchair Sports Federation (ISMWSF). This trend of including the ISMWSF logo on the medals can be traced back to the 1968 Summer Paralympics in Tel Aviv, Israel, where the emblem is dominant on the medals.

No mascot was included in these games. Mascots were not implemented until the 1980 Summer Paralympics in Arnhem.

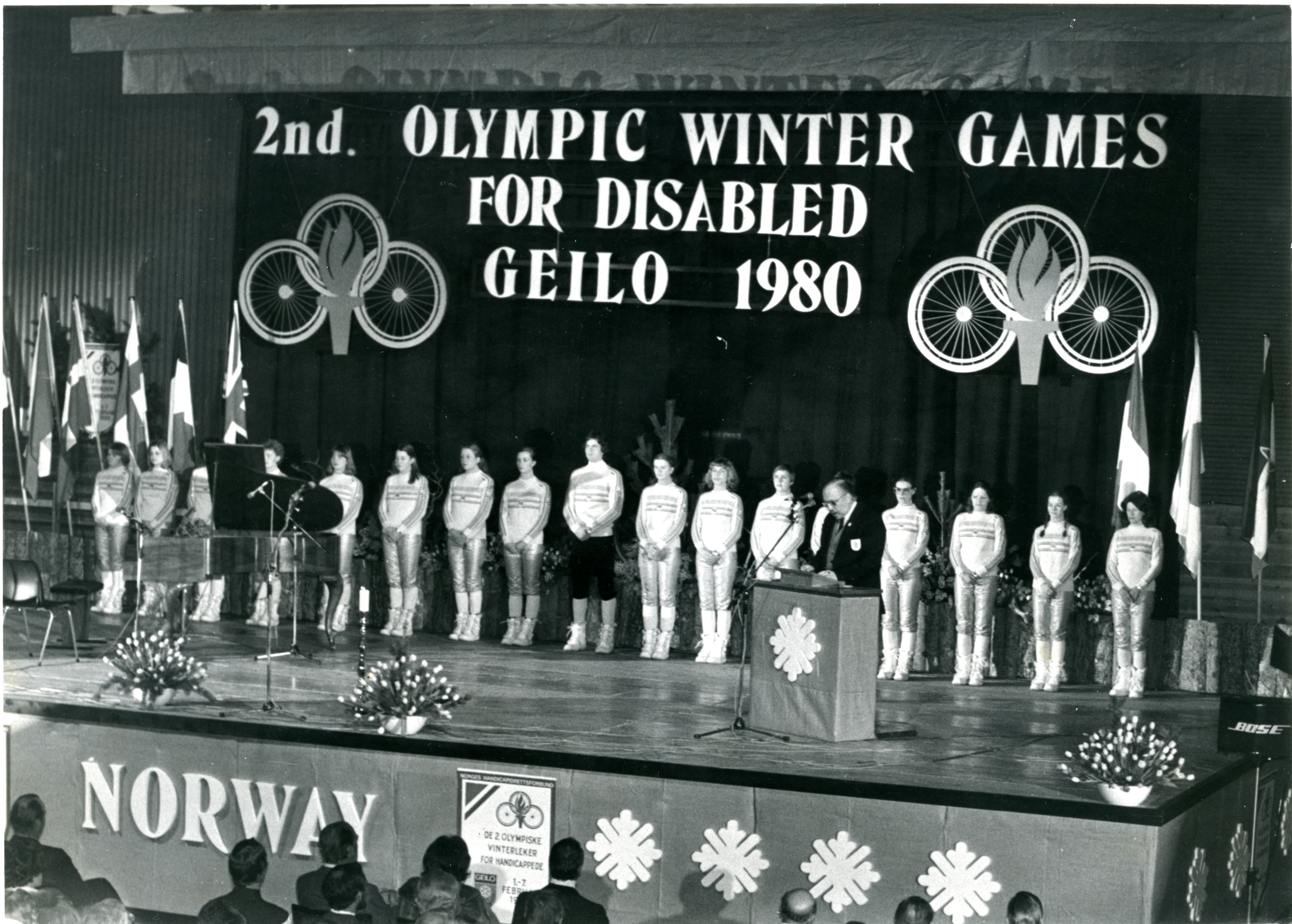
Opening ceremony in Geilo Idrettshallen stadium

== Opening ceremony ==
The opening ceremony was held in the Geilo Idrettshallen stadium and was officially opened by HRH Crown Prince Harald of Norway by lighting the Olympic Flame. This stadium was the local sports hall in Geilo.

== Australian team ==
The games were divided into three impairment groups – amputees, blind and visually impaired and spinal cord injuries. Out of the 299 competitors at the games, two male athletes, Peter Rickards and Kyrra Grunnsund represented Australia in the blind and visually impaired group and the amputees group respectively.

Kyrra Grunsund was a below the knee amputee and competed in two alpine skiing events, the giant slalom and the slalom and one cross-country event, middle distance of 10 km.

Peter Rickards was visually impaired with less than 10% vision and competed in two blind cross-country events: middle distance of 10 km and long distance of 20 km.

The Chef De Mission for the Australian team was Ron Finneran. This was Ron's first of five times in this role. He was the Chef De Mission for the Winter Paralympic Games in 1984, 1988, 1992 and 1994 as well. Ron was the manager of the team and was the bridge for communication between governing bodies and the Australian team. This role was voluntary due to the lack of Government funding for the Paralympic Games at the time.

== Participating nations ==
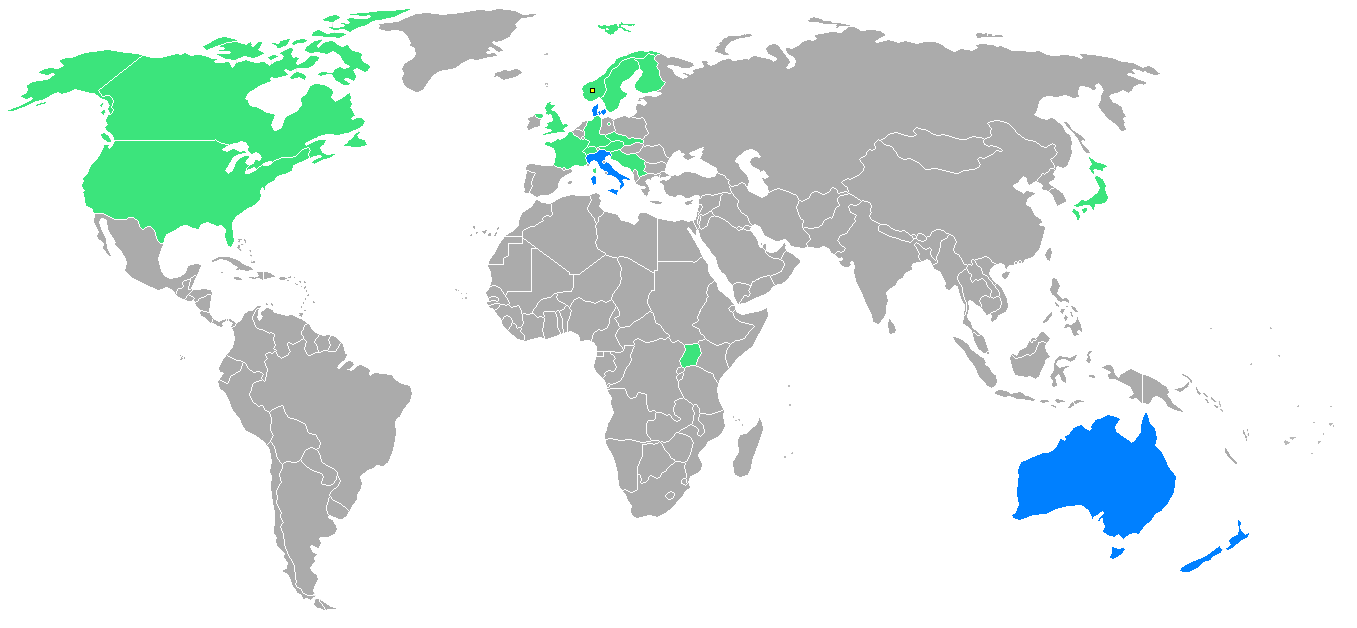
Countries which participated in the 1980 Winter Paralympics Blue = Participating for the first time Green = Have previously participated. Yellow square is host city (Geilo).

The following 18 nations were those that competed in the games:

- Australia
- Austria
- Canada
- Czechoslovakia
- Denmark
- Finland
- France
- Great Britain
- Italy
- Japan
- New Zealand
- Norway
- Sweden
- Switzerland
- United States
- Uganda
- West Germany
- Yugoslavia

=== Nations participating for the first time ===
- Australia, Denmark, Italy and New Zealand were the countries that were competing in the Winter Paralympic Games for the first time.

== Classifications ==
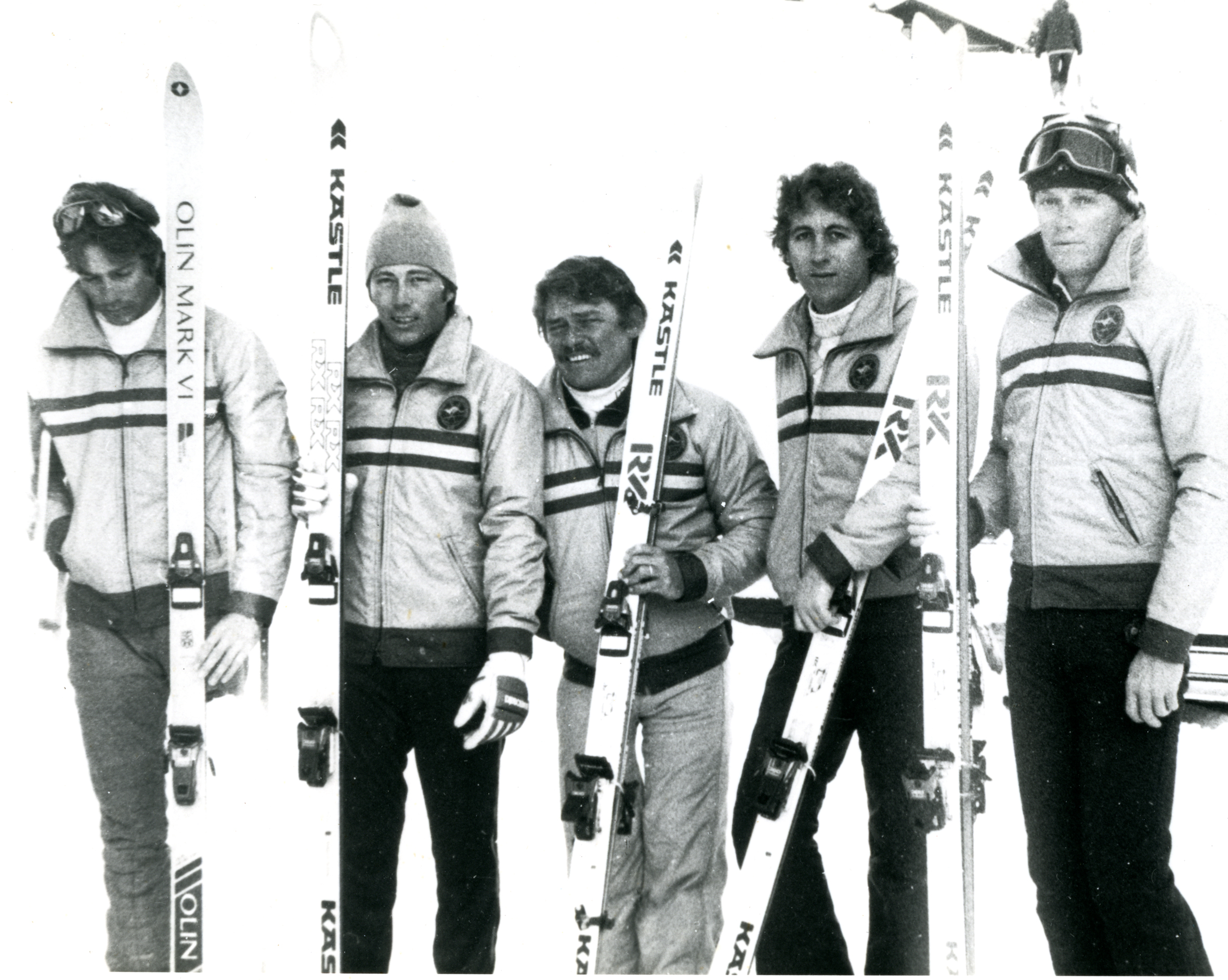
Andrew Temple, Kyrra Grunnsund, Ron Finneran, Steve Morowe, B.Abek (coach) at the 1980 Geilo Paralympic Winter Games

To ensure fairness at the Paralympic Games, there is a system in place that considers numerous factors. These factors include skill, fitness, power, endurance, tactical ability and mental focus, the same factors that account for success in sport for able bodies athletes. Functional classification is sport specific as any given disability may have significant impact in one sport and comparatively insignificant impact in another. Having the disability itself is not sufficient, the impact on the sport must be proved. For example, athletes with lower limb paralysis compete together with double knee amputees in wheelchair racing as the different injuries affect the performance of the sport in the same way.

However it was only as of 1989 in preparation for the 1992 Summer Paralympics in Barcelona that there was an agreement signed by the International Co-ordination Committee of World Sports Organizations for the Disabled (ICC and a precursor to the International Paralympic Committee) and the Organising Committee that stipulated that all sports at the Games were to be conducted using sports specific functional classification systems. Previous to this, which includes the 1980 Winter Paralympic Games, the classifications were subject to expert opinions.

=== Australian team classifications ===
5A was Rickards' classification. This means he was in the category of 'visually impaired' where participants had fewer than 10% of functional vision.

2A was Grunnsund's classification. This means he was in the category of 'standing' where participants had a single leg amputation below the knee.

== Events ==
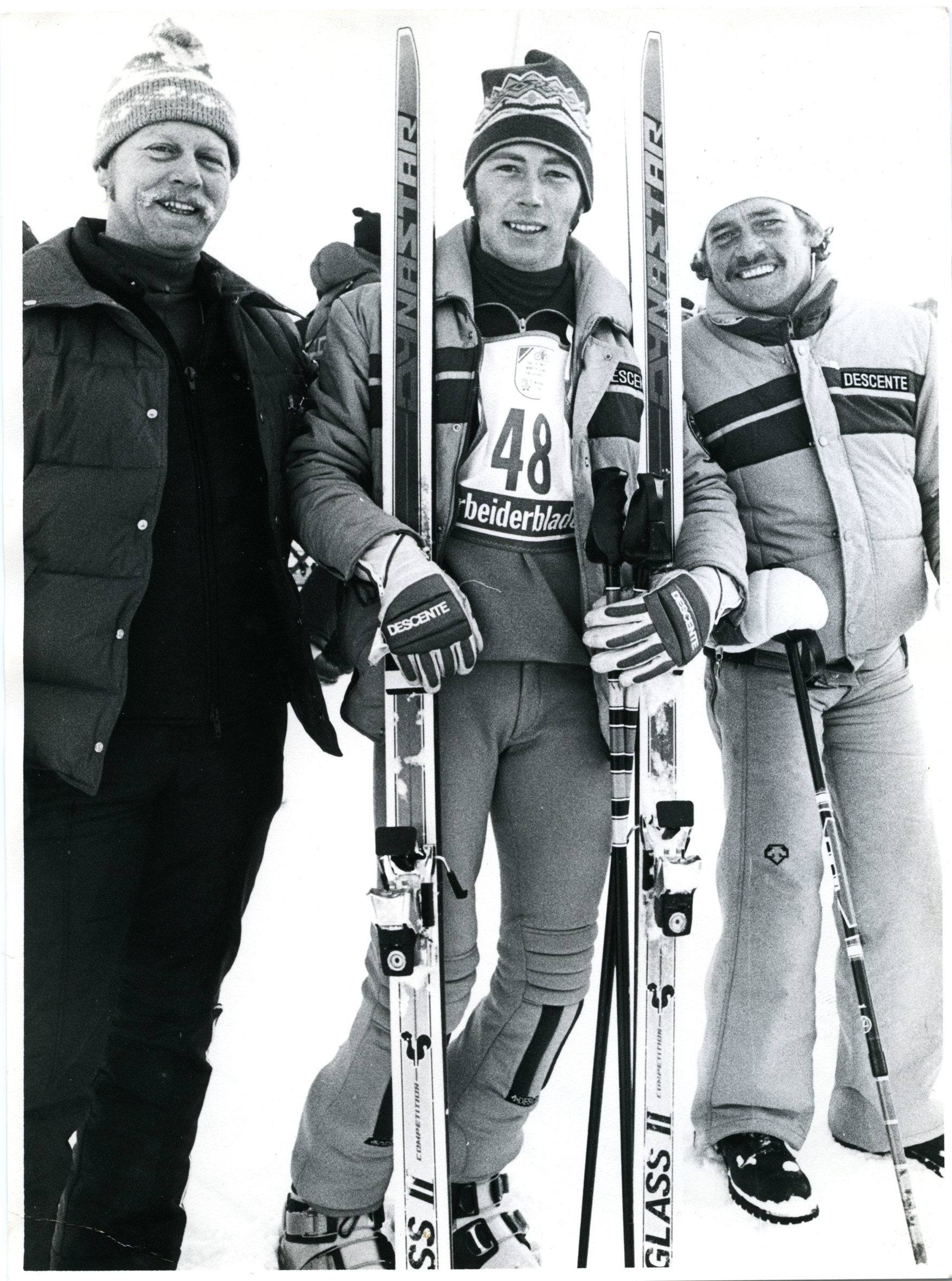
Kjell Blomgvist, Kyrra Grunnsund, Ron Finneran at the 1980 Geilo Paralympic Winter Games

=== Alpine skiing ===
Alpine skiing is a worldwide sport and is featured in several variations: downhill, slalom, giant slalom, super-G, super combined and team events. By combining speed and agility, athletes can travel at speed of up to 100 km/h down the slopes. Guides are used to assist blind/visually-impaired athletes and equipment is adapted to athletes needs including single ski, sit-ski or orthopaedic aids to support the athletes through the course. The Paralympic Games of 1976 and 1980 featured only slalom and giant slalom disciplines. The 1984 Winter Paralympics in Innsbruck, Austria, introduced downhill alpine skiing and the super-G was added to the program at the 1994 Winter Paralympics in Lillehammer, Norway.

==== Slalom skiing ====
This event is a technical event where athletes must negotiate through a high number of gates on a short course. If athletes are to miss any gates, they are disqualified.

==== Giant slalom skiing ====
This event is a longer course with fewer gates compared to the slalom. The vertical drop of the course determines the number of gates on the course. Alike the slalom skiing, if an athlete misses a gate, they are disqualified.

Athlete	Event	Time	Rank
Kyrra Grunnsund	Men's giant slalom 2A	2:35.20	9
Kyrra Grunnsund	Men's slalom 2A	1:42.70	7

The Gold medal for the men's Giant slalom 2A was won by Markus Ramsauer from Austria. He finished with a time of 2:14:94.

The gold medal for the Men's Slalom 2A was won by Josef Meusburger from Austria. He finished with a time of 1:34:14.

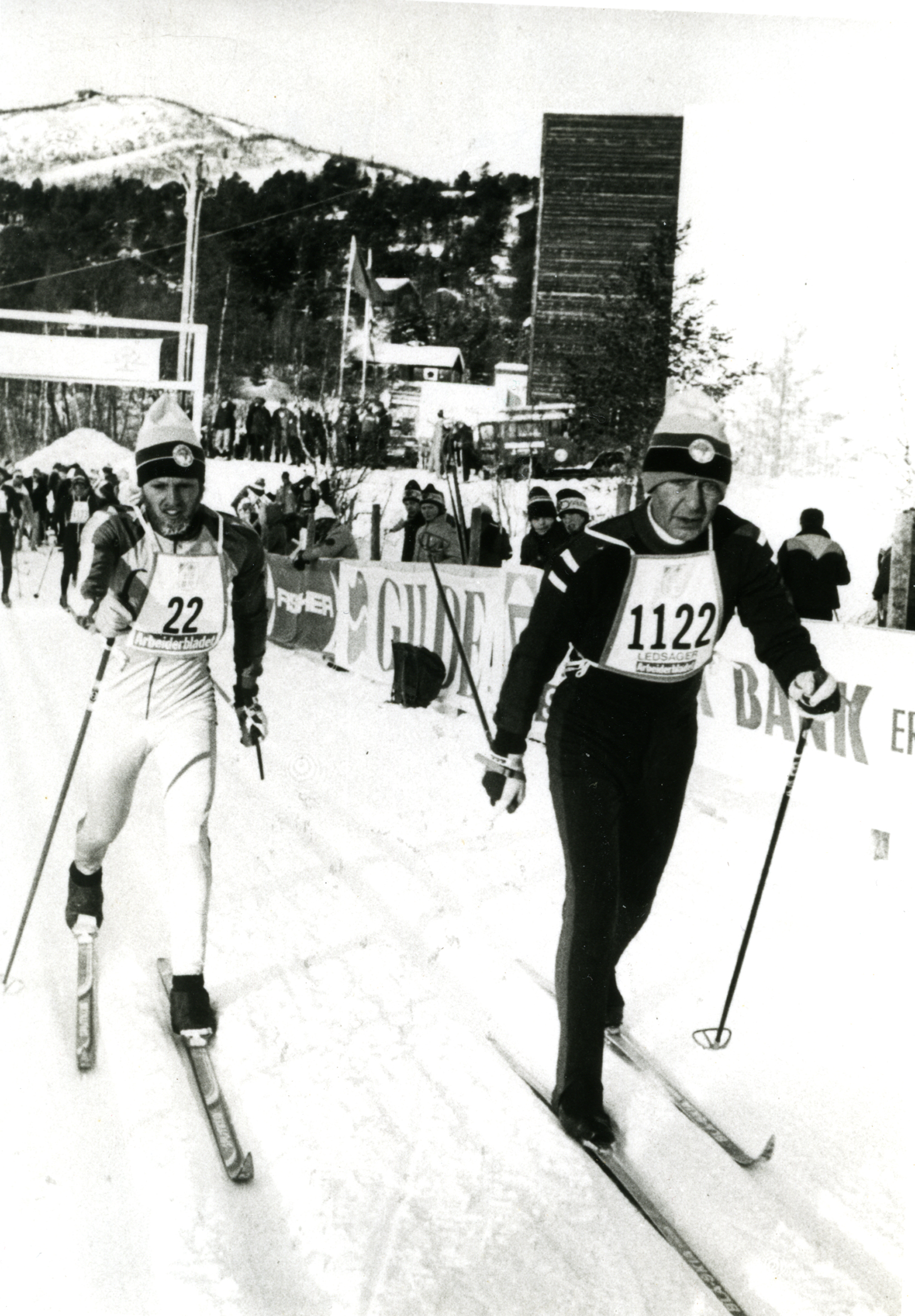
Peter Rickards with his guide at the 1980 Geilo Paralympic Winter Games

=== Cross-country skiing ===
Cross-country skiing is a race either of short distance, middle distance or long distance. These distances range from 2.5 km to 20 km. This event is open to athletes with physical impairments and blind/visual impairments.

Those with physical impairments, depending on the level of functionality, may use skis or sit-skis. A sit-ski has a specially fitted chair over a single ski where the athlete can be strapped into the device. This type of ski ensures wear and tear is minimised on the skier's body due to the commendable suspension. The skis are made from fiberglass and are normally 25–30 cm taller that the height of the skier.

All cross-country skiers in the Paralympics up until 1994 used the classical technique in all cross-country distances. However, in the 1994 Winter Paralympics in Innsbruck, skating was introduced which lead onto a new technique called the 'free technique'.

Athlete	Event	Time	Rank
Kyrra Grunnsund	Men's Middle Distance 10 km 2A	0:44:11	9
Peter Rickards	Men's Middle Distance 10 km 5A	0:41:57	10
Peter Rickards	Men's Long Distance 20 km 5A	1:32:15	14

The gold medal for the men's middle distance 10 km 2A was won by Veikki Jantunen from Finland. He finished with a time of 0:35:57.

The gold medal for the men's long distance 20 km 5A was won by Terie Loevaas from Norway. He finished with a time of 1:11:27.

The gold medal for the men's middle distance 10 km 5A was won by Morten Langereod from Norway. He finished with a time of 0:33:33.

== Medallists ==
Australia did not receive any medals at the 1980 Winter Paralympic Games.

Norwegian Brit Mjaasun Oejen, winner of 5 medals, won the most medals at the games. The leading country was the host nation, Norway, and they won 54 medals in total (23 gold, 21 silver and 10 bronze).

Rank	Nation	Gold medal	Silver medal	Bronze medal	Total
1	Norway	23	21	10	54
2	Finland	15	7	12	34
3	Austria	6	10	6	22
4	Sweden	5	3	8	16
5	Switzerland	4	2	3	9
6	United States	4	1	1	6
7	West Germany	3	5	9	17
8	Canada	2	3	1	6
9	France	1	1	1	3
10	Czechoslovakia	0	1	0	1
not ranked	Australia	0	0	0	0
not ranked	Denmark	0	0	0	0
not ranked	Great Britain	0	0	0	0
not ranked	Italy	0	0	0	0
not ranked	Japan	0	0	0	0
not ranked	New Zealand	0	0	0	0
not ranked	Uganda	0	0	0	0
not ranked	Yugoslavia	0	0	0	0

== Closing ceremony ==
Little is known about the closing ceremony of the 1980 Winter Paralympics in Geilo. However, it is said it was very low key and held in the same stadium, Idrettshallen stadium, as the opening ceremony.

== See also ==
- Australia at the Winter Paralympics
- 1980 Winter Paralympics
- Australia at the 1980 Summer Paralympics
- Australia at the Paralympics
- Paralympic Games
