= Rod Hacon =

Australian Paralympic skier

Medal record

Representing Australia

Disabled skiing

World Skiing Championships
Bronze medal – third place	1996	sit-ski slalom

Rod Hacon is a disabled skier from Australia. In 1996, at the World Skiing Championships, Hacon won a bronze medal in the sit-ski slalom.

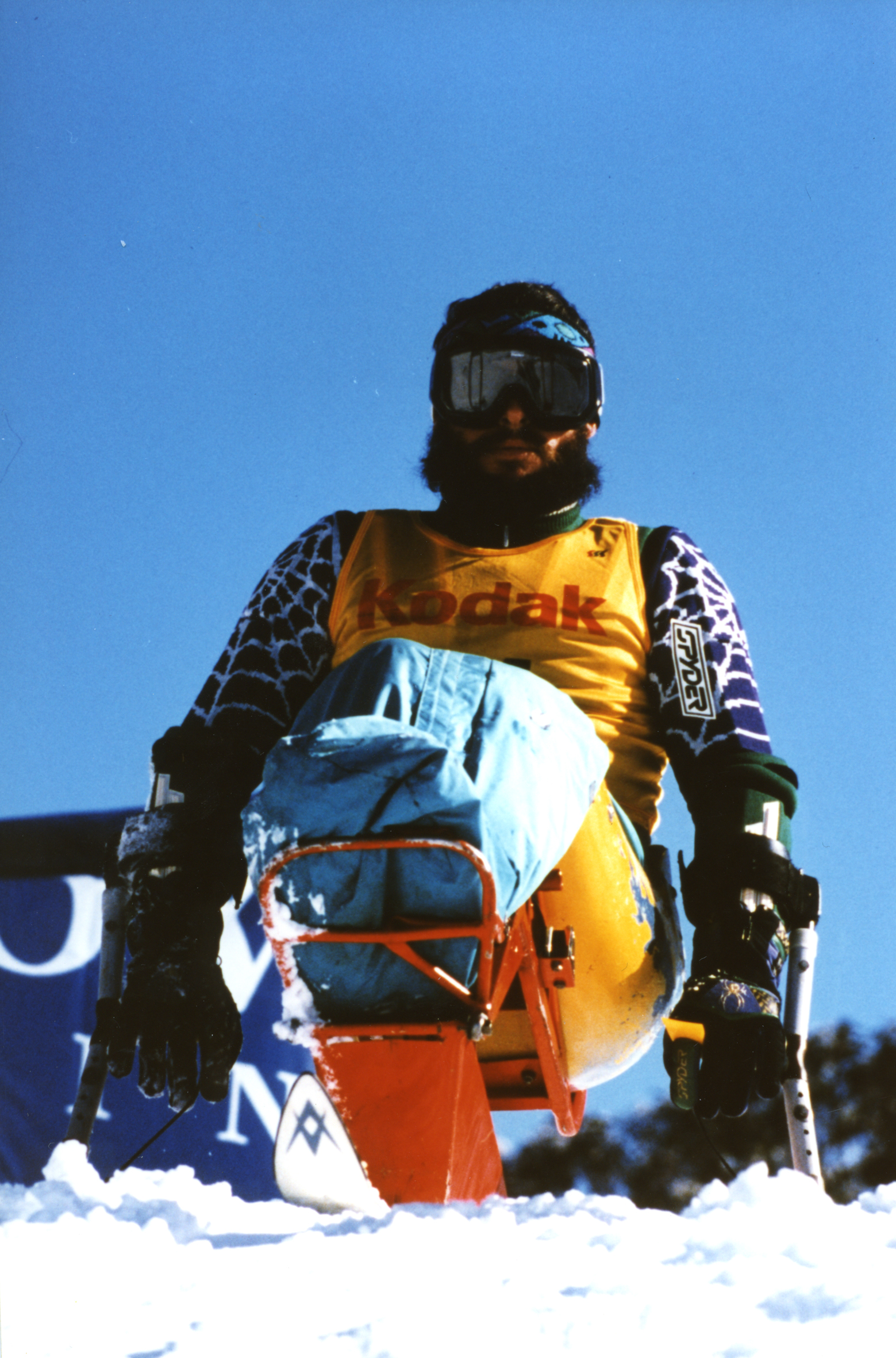
Australian Paralympic athlete Rod Hacon

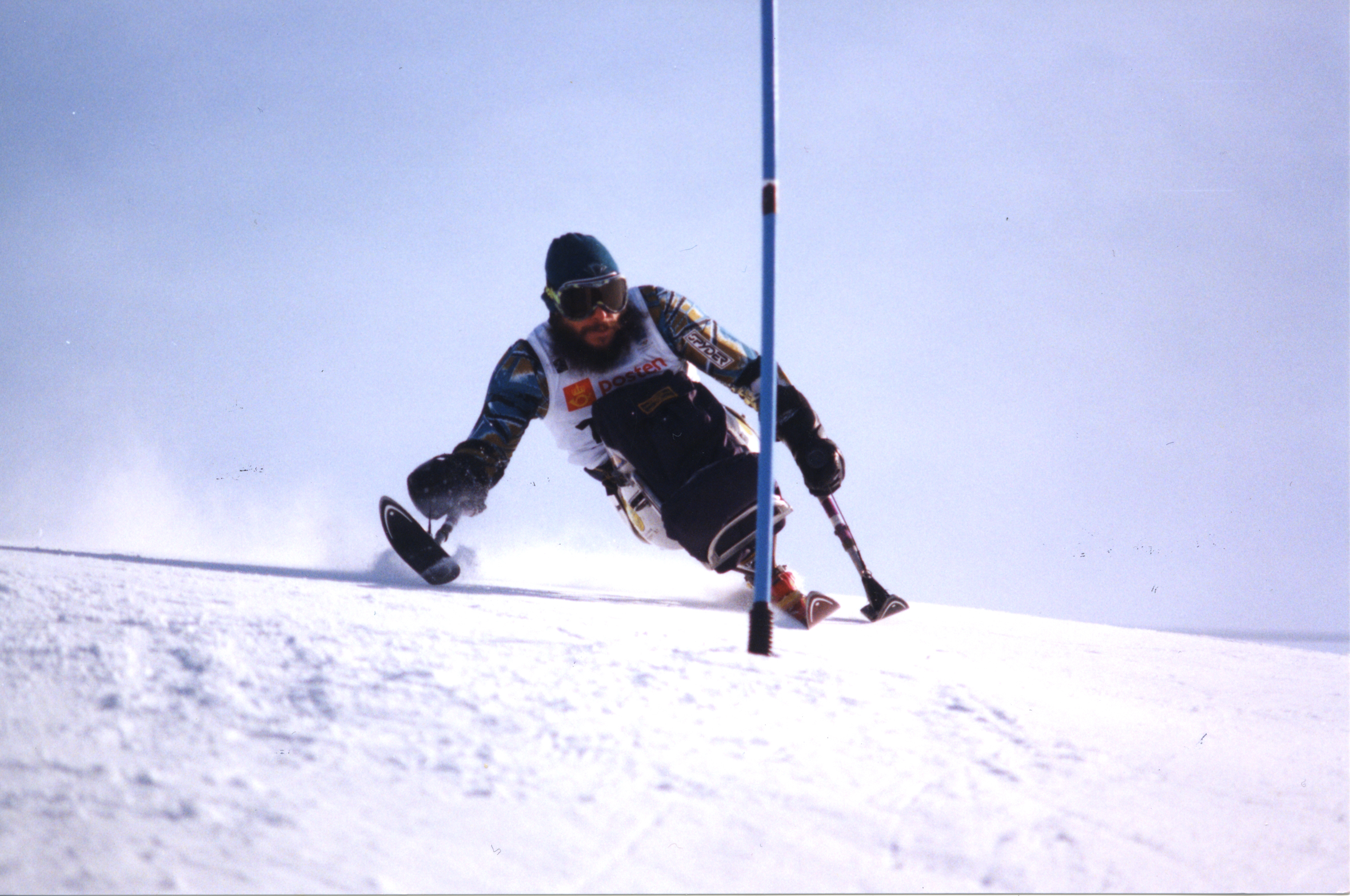
Australian Paralympic athlete Rod Hacon at the 1994 Lillehammer Winter Games

At the 1992 Winter Paralympics, he competed in two events where he did not finish in the Men's Giant Slalom LW11 and Men's Slalom LW11. At the 1994 Winter Paralympics, he competed in four events, finishing fifth in the Men's Downhill LWXII and fourth in the Men's Super-G LWXI. He did not finish in the Men's Giant Slalom LWXII and Men's Slalom LWXII.

== See also ==
- Australia at the Paralympics
- Disabled sports

== Bibliography ==
- Australian Paralympic Federation (1997). "1996 - Highlights of the Year in Review". Australian Paralympic Federation Annual Report. Australia: Australian Paralympic Federation.
