= James Paterson (skier) =

Australian Paralympic skier (born 1970)

James Paterson OAM
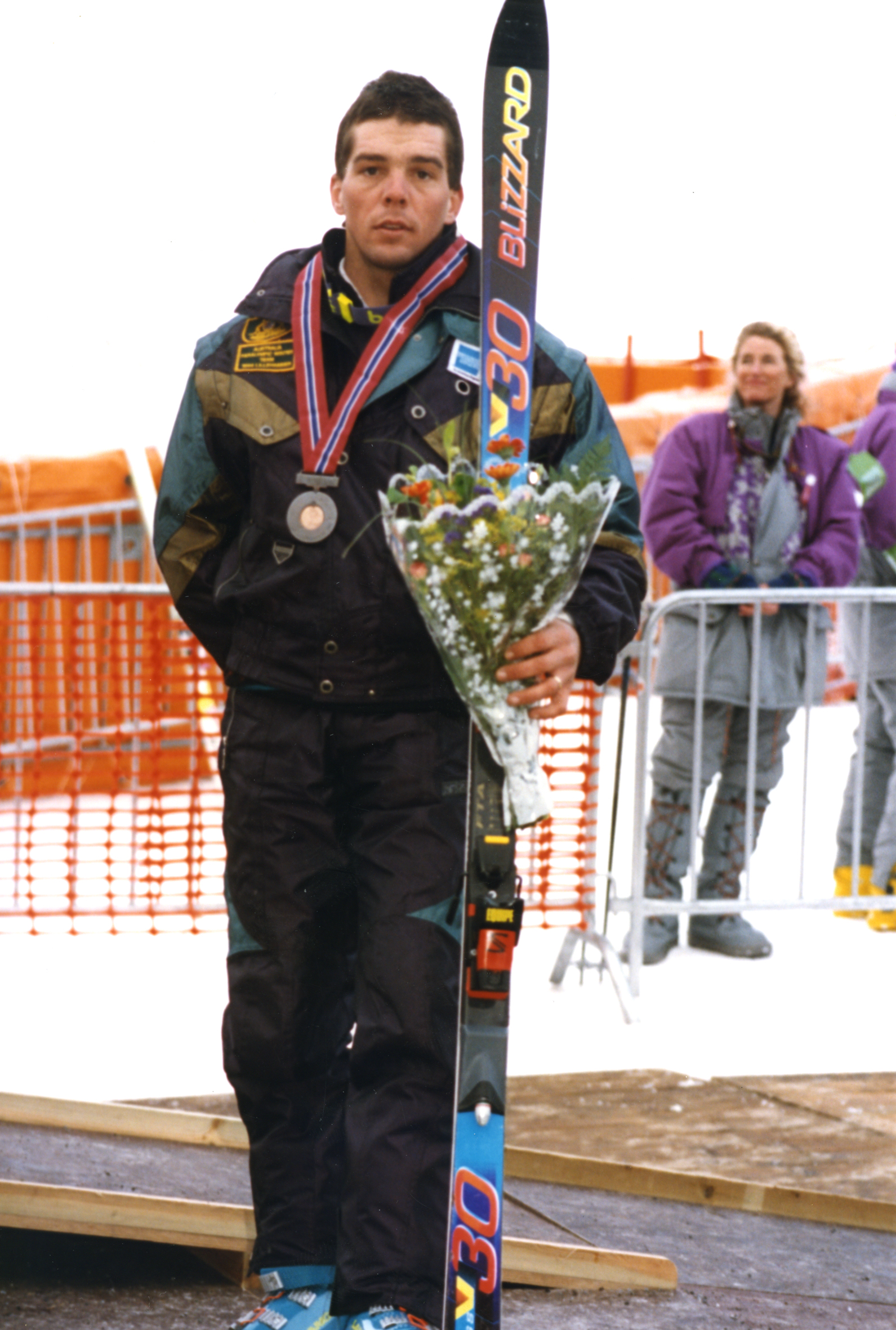
- Australian medallist James Paterson at the 1994 Lillehammer Winter Games

Personal information
- Full name: James Lawrence Paterson
- Nationality: Australian
- Born: 2 January 1970 (age 56) West Wyalong NSW
Medal record
Alpine skiing
Winter Paralympic Games
Gold medal – first place	1998 Nagano	Men's Downhill LW1,3,5/7,9
Silver medal – second place	1994 Lillehammer	Men's Downhill LW9
Bronze medal – third place	1994 Lillehammer	Men's Giant Slalom LW9
Bronze medal – third place	1998 Nagano	Men's Slalom LW9
IPC Alpine Skiing World Championships
Silver medal – second place	1996 Lech am Arlberg	Men's Super G LW9
Silver medal – second place	2000 Anzere	Men's Giant Slalom LW1,3,7,7,9
Bronze medal – third place	1996 Lech am Arlberg	Men's Slalom LW9
Bronze medal – third place	1996 Lech am Arlberg	Men's Downhill LW9

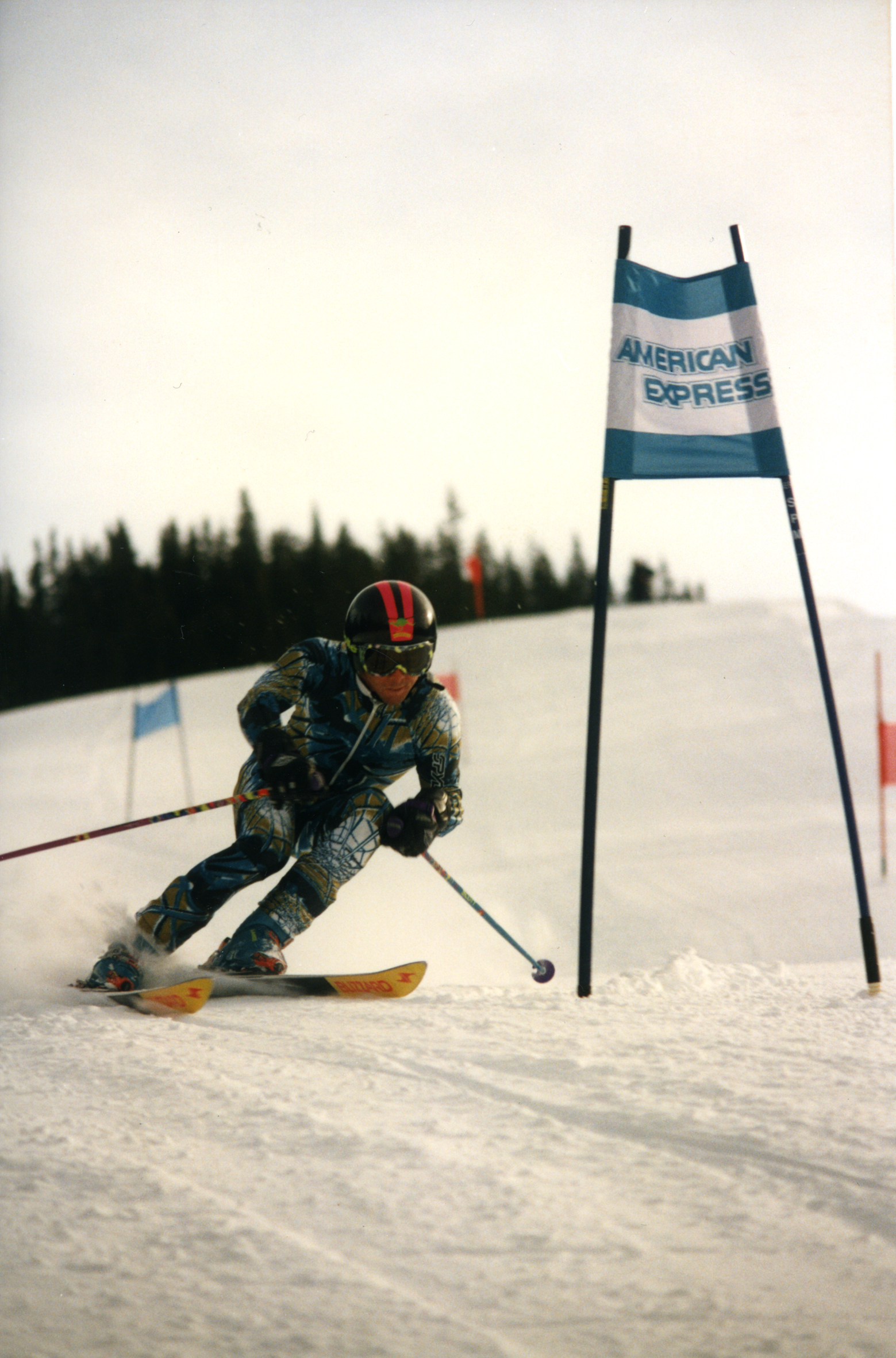
Australian Paralympic athlete James Paterson competing at the 1994 Lillehammer Winter Games

James Lawrence Paterson is an Australian Paralympic skier who has cerebral palsy.

== Personal life ==
Paterson was from Terrigal, New South Wales and a marine mechanic for Halvorsen Boats. After the 1994 Games, Paterson thanked the Terrigal community and his employer for supporting his overseas preparation.

== Skiing career ==
At the 1994 Lillehammer Winter Paralympics, Paterson competed in four events and won a silver medal in the Men's Downhill LW9 event and a bronze medal in the Men's Giant Slalom LW9 event. In 1996, at the IPC Alpine Skiing World Championships, he won a silver medal and two bronze medals. At the 1998 Winter Paralympics, he was team captain and competed in four events. He won a gold medal in the Men's Downhill LW1,3,5/7,9 event and a bronze medal in the Men's Slalom LW9 event Between 1997 and 1999, he was an Australian Institute of Sport Athlete with a Disability scholarship holder. His last major international competition was the 2000 IPC Alpine Skiing World Championships, where he won a silver medal in the Men's Giant Slalom LW1,3,7,7,9. He announced his retirement in June 2001 citing his lost passion and the cost of competing on his family and finances.

== Recognition ==
In 2000, Paterson received an Australian Sports Medal. In 2008, he was awarded a Medal of the Order of Australia in recognition for being a medallist at Paralympics and Disabled World Ski Championships. He has been inducted into the Central Coast Sporting Hall of Fame.

Paterson is married to Martina, and has two children, Emily and Cameron.

== Bibliography ==
- Australian Paralympic Federation (1997). "1996 – Highlights of the Year in Review". Australian Paralympic Federation Annual Report. Australia: Australian Paralympic Federation.
- Australian Paralympic Committee (1999). "Fencing". Australian Paralympic Committee Annual Report (1998 ed.). Australia: Australian Paralympic Committee.
