= Michael Milton (skier) =

Australian Paralympic skier, cyclist and triathlete

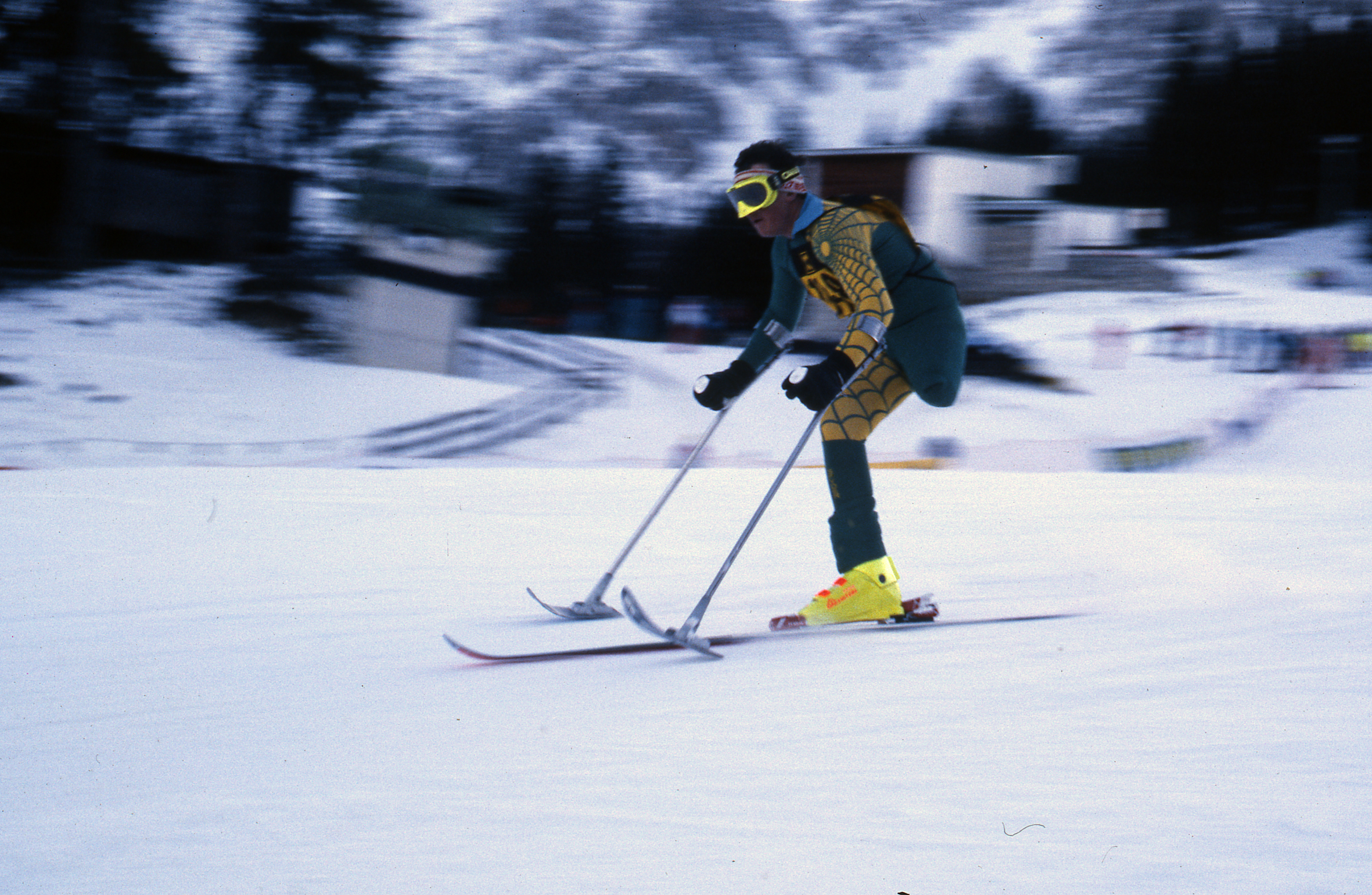
- Michael Milton at the 1988 Winter Paralympics

Personal information
- Full name: Michael John Milton
- Nationality: Australian
- Born: 21 March 1973 (age 53) Canberra, Australian Capital Territory
- Years active: 1988–2008; 2025-2026

Sport
- Country: Australia
- Sport: Para-alpine skiing and cycling
- Disability class: LW2
- Partner: Penni Milton (nee Lewer)
- Coached by: Steve Graham (ski racing)
Medal record
Men's para-alpine skiing
Representing Australia
Winter Paralympics
Gold medal – first place	1992 Albertville	Slalom
Gold medal – first place	1994 Lillehammer	Giant slalom
Gold medal – first place	2002 Salt Lake City	Downhill
Gold medal – first place	2002 Salt Lake City	Super-G
Gold medal – first place	2002 Salt Lake City	Giant slalom
Gold medal – first place	2002 Salt Lake City	Slalom
Silver medal – second place	1992 Albertville	Super-G
Silver medal – second place	1994 Lillehammer	Slalom
Silver medal – second place	2006 Turin	Downhill
Bronze medal – third place	1994 Lillehammer	Downhill
Bronze medal – third place	1994 Lillehammer	Super-G
IPC Alpine Skiing World Championships
Gold medal – first place	1996 Lech	Giant slalom
Gold medal – first place	2000 Anzere	Downhill
Gold medal – first place	2000 Anzere	Slalom
Gold medal – first place	2000 Anzere	Super-G
Gold medal – first place	2004 Wildshonau	Giant slalom
Gold medal – first place	2004 Wildshonau	Slalom
Silver medal – second place	1996 Lech	Slalom
Silver medal – second place	2000 Anzere	Giant slalom
Silver medal – second place	2004 Wildshonau	Downhill
Silver medal – second place	2004 Wildshonau	Super-G
Bronze medal – third place	1996 Lech	Super-G

Michael John Milton, OAM (born 21 March 1973) is an Australian Paralympic skier, Paralympic cyclist and paratriathlete with one leg. With 6 gold, 3 silver and 2 bronze medals he is the most successful Australian Paralympic athlete in the Winter Games.

In 2024, Milton was elevated to Legend of the Sport Australia Hall of Fame.

== Personal ==
Milton was born in Canberra, Australian Capital Territory, on 21 March 1973. His left leg was amputated above the knee when he was nine years old due an osteogenic sarcoma (bone cancer). He grew up in a skiing family and, after losing his leg, he was determined to ski again. Milton married his wife Penni in 2006 while undergoing treatment for oesophageal cancer. Their first child (Matilda) was one year old. Following surgery, chemotherapy and radiotherapy, Milton was selected in the Australian team to compete as a cyclist at the 2008 Beijing Paralympic Games. Milton's son (Angus) was born in November 2008. Milton opened Quizzic Alley, a store specialising in licensed Harry Potter merchandise, in his home town of Canberra in September 2018 and a second store in Sydney in December 2020. In November 2023 Milton was diagnosed with cancer for the third time. He had surgery in December to remove a tumour from his bowel and was given the all-clear soon after.

== Skiing ==
I think there's a natural competitive spirit within myself, and perhaps the environment that I grew up in – learning to live with one leg, wanting to be competitive with my able-bodied peers – really created that mindset.... it's only a leg. The really important things in life are family, friends and having fun. None of those things have anything to do with how many legs you have.

— Michael Milton, skier

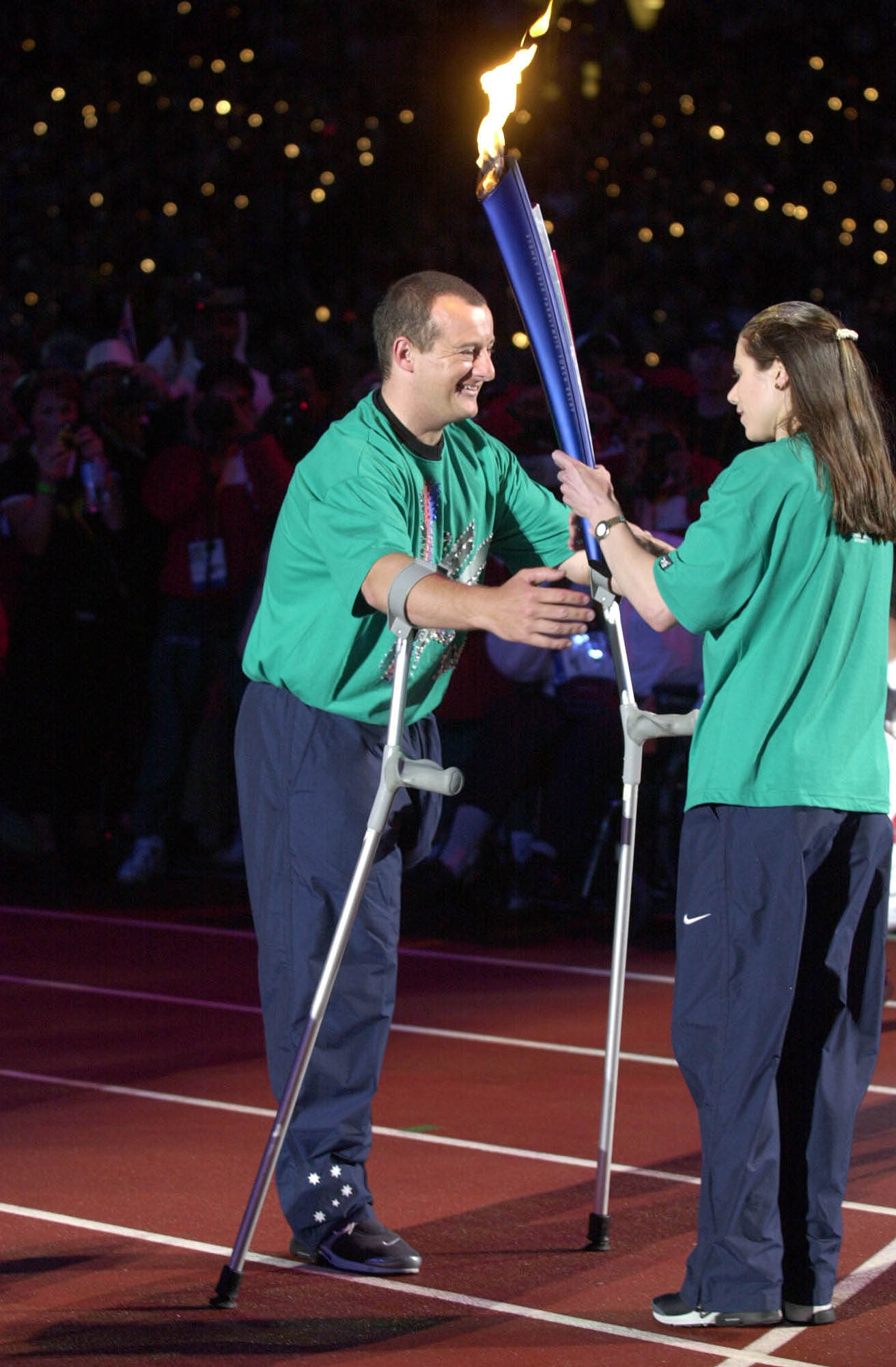
Australian athlete Lisa Llorens passes the Paralympic flame to Milton during the torch relay at the 2000 Summer Paralympics Opening Ceremony

Milton participated but did not win any medals at the 1988 Innsbruck Winter Paralympics. At the 1992 Tignes-Albertville Winter Paralympics, he won a gold medal in the men's slalom LW2 event, for which he received a Medal of the Order of Australia, and a silver medal in the men's Super-G LW2 event. He became the first Australian to win a gold medal at a winter Olympics or Paralympics. That year he also won the slalom in the Austrian championships, and in 1993 he won both the slalom and super giant slalom at the Columbia Crest Cup. At the 1994 Lillehammer Winter Paralympics, he won a gold medal in the men's giant slalom LW2 event, a silver medal in the men's slalom LW2 event, and two bronze medals in the men's Downhill LW2 and Men's Super-G LW2 events. In January 1996, he won a gold, silver and bronze medal at the World Skiing Championships held in Austria.

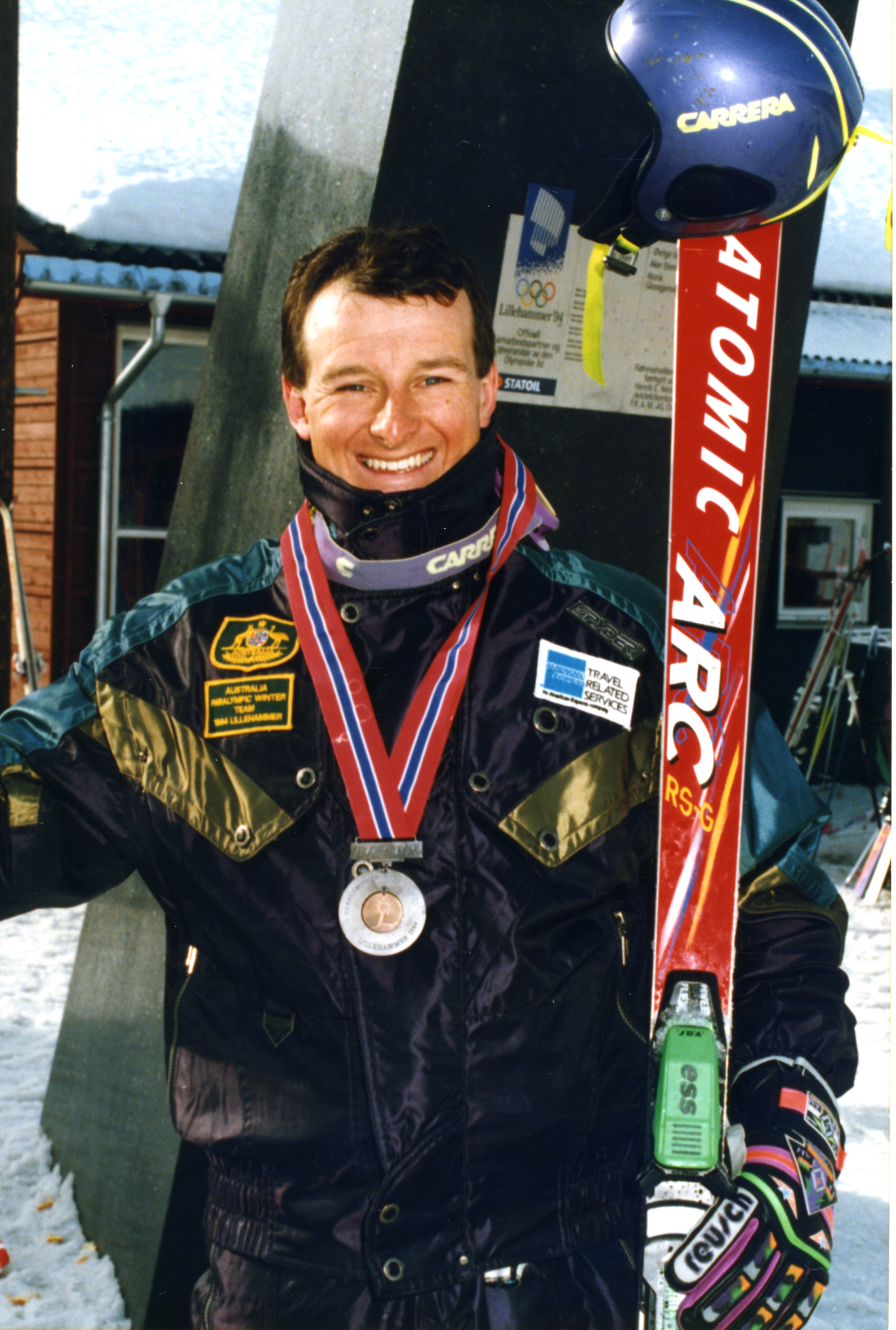
Michael Milton at the 1994 Lillehammer Winter Games

In 2000, he received an Australian Sports Medal. In 2001, he was inducted into the Australian Institute of Sport 'Best of the Best'. At the 2002 Salt Lake City Winter Paralympics, he won four gold medals in the men's Downhill LW2, Men's giant slalom LW2, Men's slalom LW2, and Men's Super-G LW2 events. In April 2005, he was the first person with a disability to break the 200 kilometres per hour mark with a speed of 210.4 km/h. He then aimed to beat the Australian open record of 212.26 km/h, set in 1997 by able-bodied athlete Nick Kirshner. At the 2006 Turin Winter Paralympics, he won a silver medal in the men's Downhill standing event.

On 12 July 2007, it was announced on Sports Tonight that he had been diagnosed with oesophageal cancer. He had a six centimetre tumour removed, along with most of his oesophagus and some of his stomach. He is now in remission. Less than a year later, he was selected for the Beijing Paralympics, his first Summer Paralympics, as a cyclist.

At the 2014 Sochi Games, he was the assistant alpine skiing coach of the Australian Paralympic Team.

Milton came out of retirement in October 2025 to compete at the 2026 Winter Paralympics. In February 2025, he suffered a fracture in his femur while training in the US. His results were - 13th in Men's Super combined - Standing, 20th in Men's Slalom - Standing and 23rd in Men's Super-G - Standing. At 52 years and 350 days when the Games opened on 6 March, he became the oldest ever Australian Winter Paralympian.

Milton holds the open Australian downhill speed skiing record, beating the top recorded speeds by able-bodied skiers. His personal best downhill speed is 213.65 km/h (132.76 mph).

== Cycling ==
On 12 July 2007, it was announced on Sports Tonight that he had been diagnosed with oesophageal cancer. He had a six centimetre tumour removed along with his oesophagus and is now in remission. Less than a year later, he was selected for the Beijing Paralympics, his first Summer Paralympics, as a cyclist. His results were - 9th in the Men's 1km time trial LC3-4 and 8th in Men's individual pursuit LC3.

== Other athletic achievements ==
On 7 July 2013 Milton broke the world record for running a marathon with crutches. It was Milton's first attempt at a marathon, and he finished the course in 5:23:30.

Milton has also walked the Kokoda Track twice and scaled Mount Kilimanjaro.

== Recognition ==
- 1992 – Medal of the Order of Australia
- 2000 – Australian Sports Medal
- 2001 – Australian Institute of Sport 'Best of the Best' inductee
- 2002 – Australian Paralympian of the Year
- 2002 – Laureus World Sportsperson of the Year with a Disability
- 2007 – Australian Capital Territory Australian of the Year.
- 2014 – Sport Australia Hall of Fame inductee
- 2015 – ACT Sports Hall of Fame inductee
- 2022 - Paralympics Australia Hall of Fame
- 2024 - Elevated to Sport Australia Hall of Fame Legend
