= Kyrra Grunnsund =

Australian Paralympic skier and athlete

Kyrra Grunnsund OAM
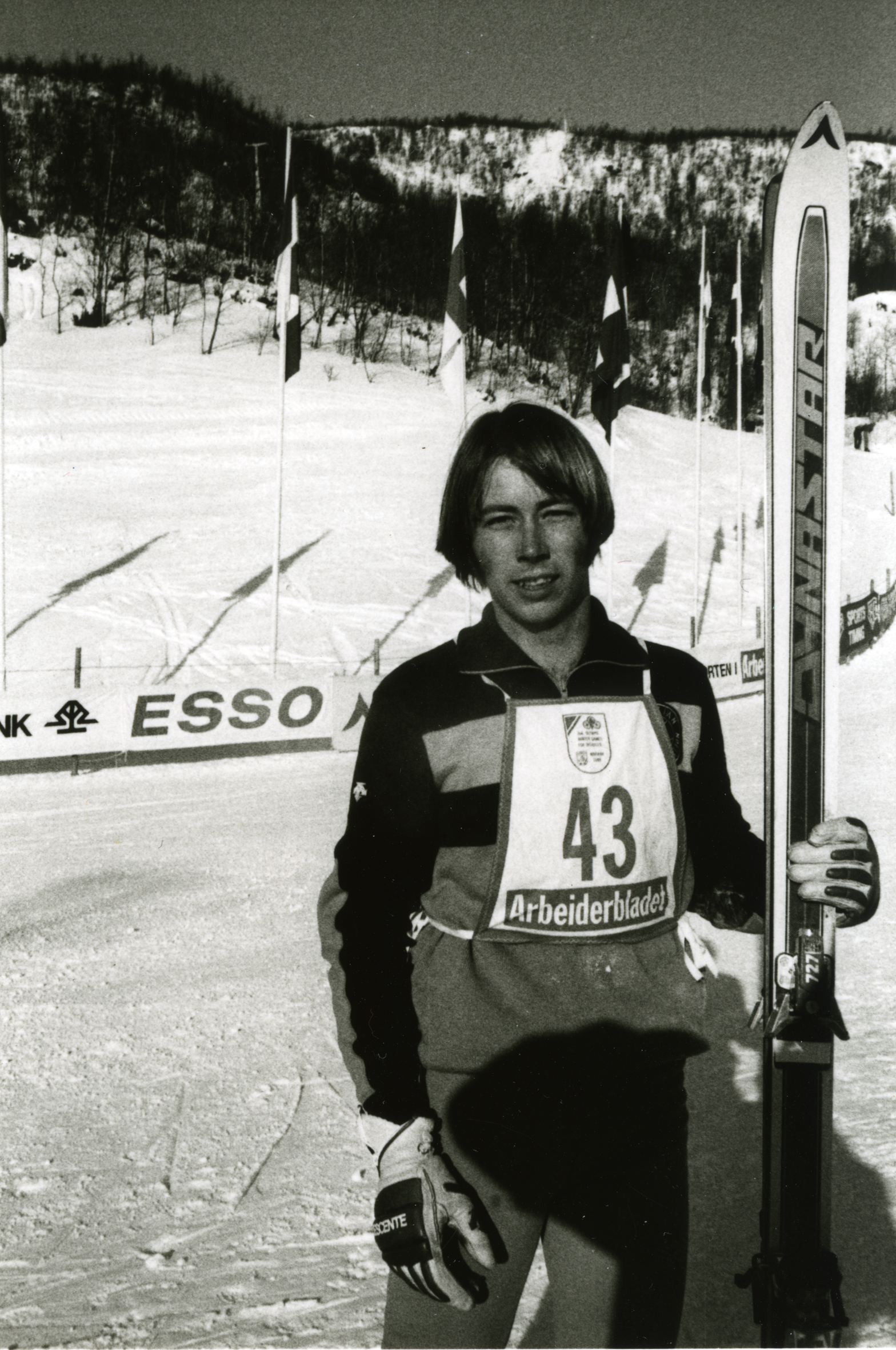
- Grunnsund at the 1980 Geilo Winter Games

Personal information
- Nationality: Australia
- Born: 18 March 1959 (age 66)

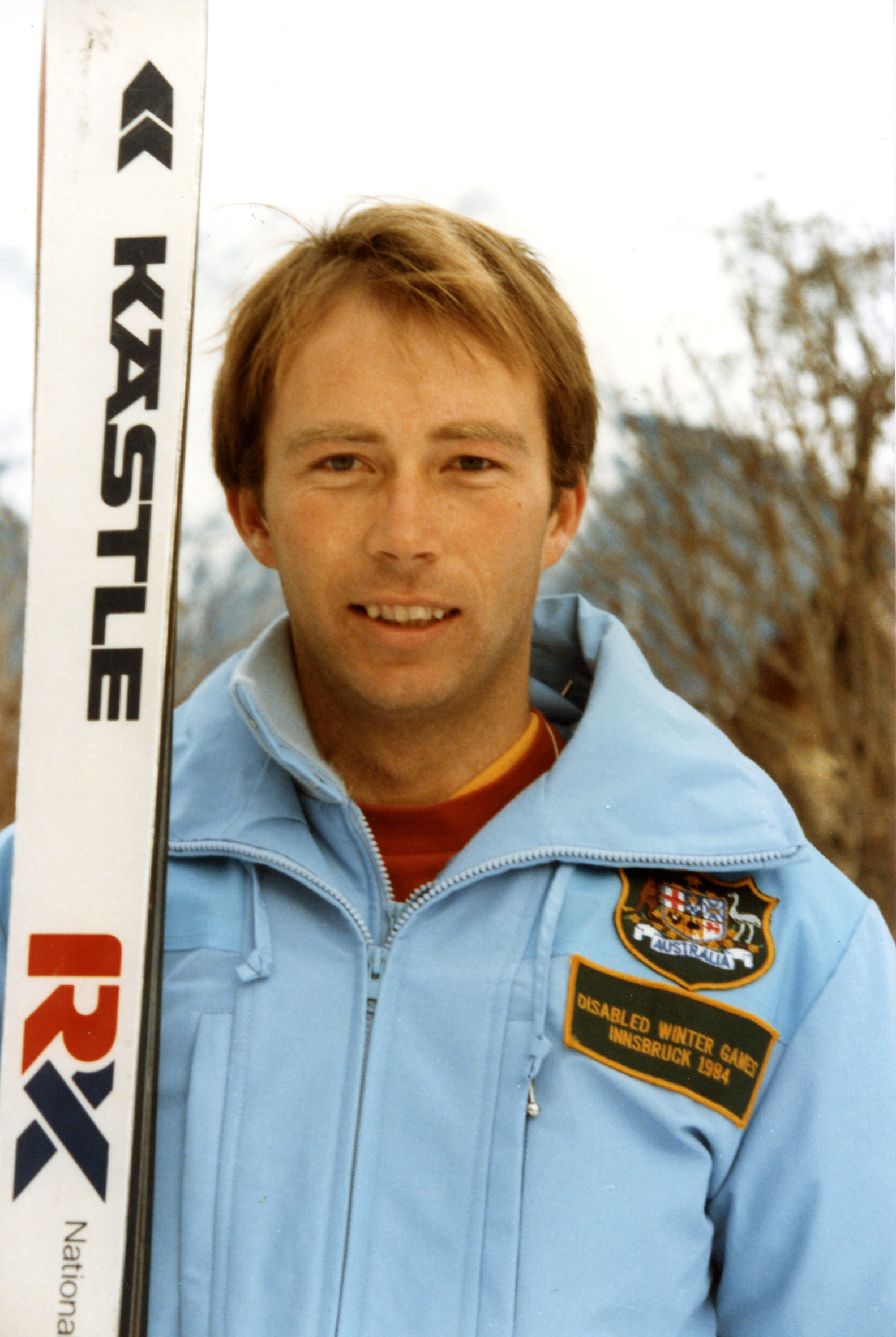
Grunnsund at the 1984 Innsbruck Winter Games

Kyrra Grunnsund OAM (born 18 March 1959) is an Australian Paralympic skier and athlete who has represented his country at five Paralympics, four winter and one summer. He was the first Australian to compete at both the Summer and Winter Paralympics, moving from skiing to athletics in 1992.

== Personal ==
Grunnsund is a below-the-knee amputee. In 2000, he was living in the Sydney suburb of Newtown.

== Competitive career ==
Grunnsund is an Australian Paralympic skier and athlete who has represented Australia at five Paralympics, four winter and one summer. He competed in both alpine and cross-country skiing at the 1980 Geilo Paralympics and competed in just alpine skiing at the 1984 Innsbruck, 1988 Innsbruck, and 1992 Tignes-Albertville Winter Paralympics, which was his final Winter Games appearance in the same year he had his first Summer Paralympics appearance. He switched sports in 1992, and then became the first Australian to compete in both the summer and winter Paralympics when he competed in the 5,000 m and 10,000 m races.

As the equivalent of a T44 competitor, he set an Australian national record at the 1992 Games on 12 September with a time of 19:24.28 in the 5,000 metres. He set an Australian Allcomers record two years later on 6 March 1994 in Canberra in the same event with a time of 21:11.94.

== Recognition ==
Grunnsund received a Medal of the Order of Australia in 1995 and an Australian Sports Medal in 2000.

He was one of fifty-one Australian Paralympians to carry the Olympic torch during the 2000 Summer Olympics torch relay, when he carried it on 14 September 2000, the 99th day of the relay.
