= David Munk =

Australian para-alpine skier

Personal information
- Nationality: Australia
Medal record
Men's alpine skiing
Paralympic Games
Bronze medal – third place	1992 Albertville	Men's Super-G LW11
Bronze medal – third place	1994 Lillehammer	Men's Giant Slalom LWXI

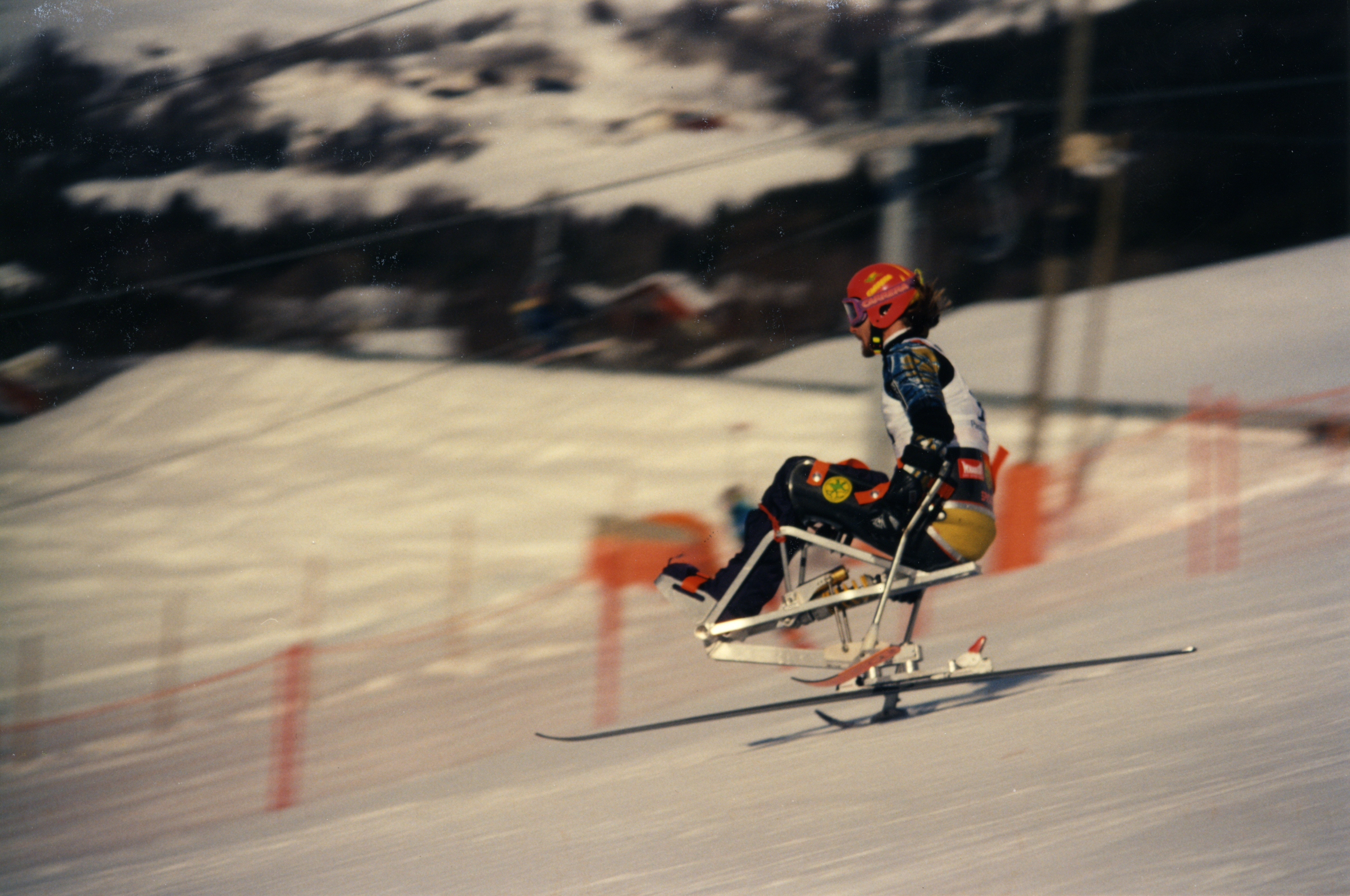
Australian Paralympian David Munk at the 1994 Lillehammer Winter Games

David Munk is a Paralympic alpine sit skier from Australia. He won bronze medals at the 1992 Albertville Games and 1994 Lillehammer Games.

He competed in two events at the 1988 Innsbruck Games. At the 1992 Albertville Games, he competed in three events and won a bronze medal in the Men's Super-G LW11. At his third Games, 1994 Lillehammer Games, he competed in four events and won a bronze medal in the Men's Giant Slalom LWXI. He was due to compete at the 1998 Nagano Games but a kidney infection forced him to withdraw.
