= Australia at the Paralympics =

- IPC code: AUS
- NPC: Paralympics Australia
- Website: www.paralympic.org.au
- Medals Ranked 6th: Gold 389 Silver 422 Bronze 394 Total 1,205

Summer appearances
- 1960; 1964; 1968; 1972; 1976; 1980; 1984; 1988; 1992; 1996; 2000; 2004; 2008; 2012; 2016; 2020; 2024

Winter appearances
- 1976; 1980; 1984; 1988; 1992; 1994; 1998; 2002; 2006; 2010; 2014; 2018; 2022; 2026

Australia has participated officially in every Paralympic Games since its inauguration in 1960 with the exception of the 1976 Winter Paralympics.

The Paralympic Games are held every four years, following the Olympic Games and are governed by the International Paralympic Committee (IPC). The Paralympic Games have been contractually tied to the Olympic Games since 2001, however, they have taken place at the same venues since the 1988 Seoul Summer Games and the 1992 Albertville Winter Games.

In order to compete at the Paralympics, athletes must have an eligible impairment that leads to a permanent activity limitation, and athletes will compete in the classification appropriate to their impairment. These impairments are physical, vision and intellectual impairments.

Paralympics Australia, established in 1990, is responsible for selecting and preparing the Australian Paralympic Teams for both the Summer and Winter Paralympic Games. This committee assists with funding the athletes and competition in addition to talent identification.

Many of Australia's gold medals have come from Athletics, a sport which has been popular amongst Australian Paralympic athletes, such as Tim Sullivan and Louise Sauvage. The other sport from which many medals have come is Swimming.

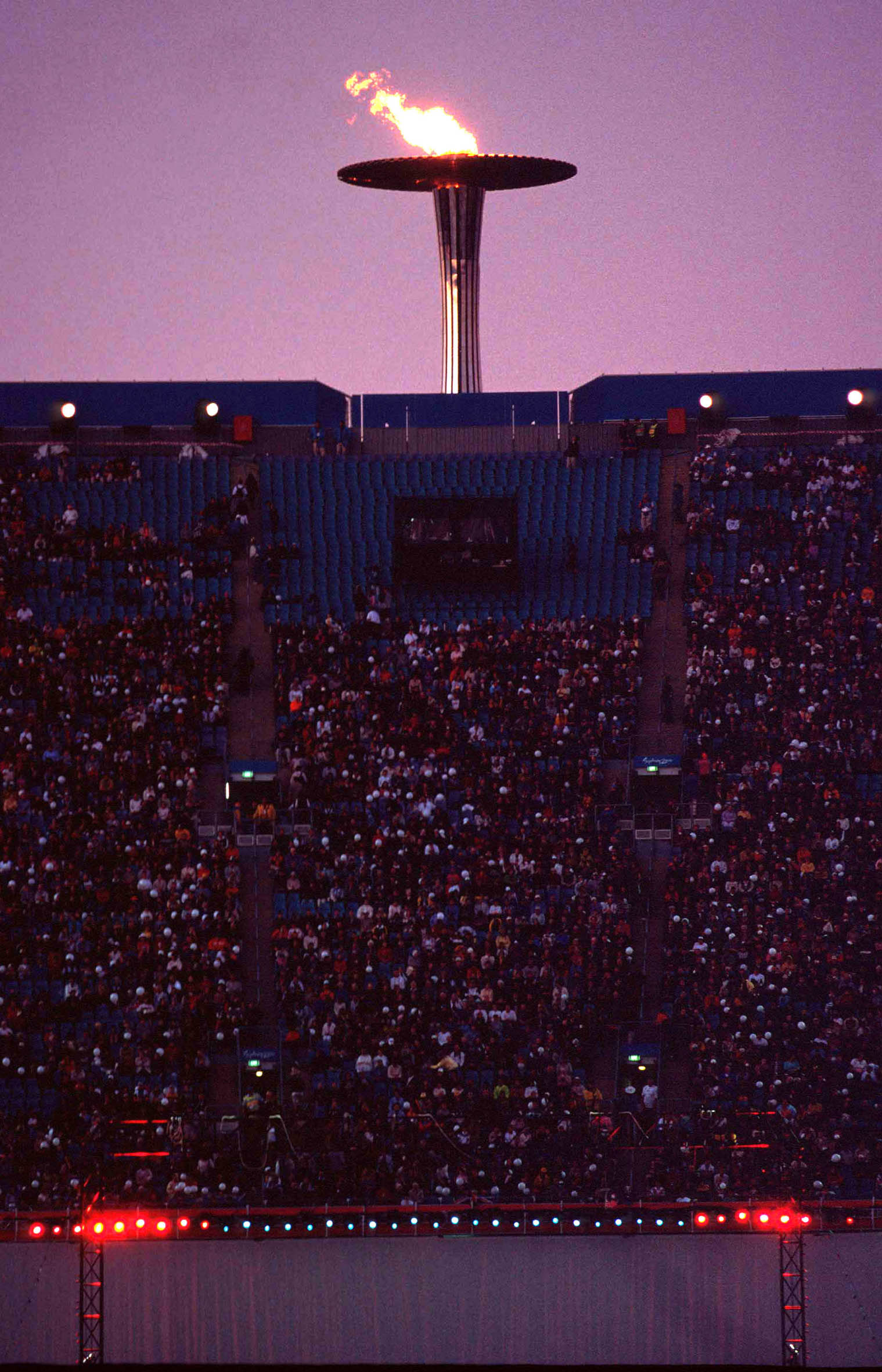
Paralympic Flame alight in Sydney at the 2000 Summer Paralympic Games.

Australia has hosted the Paralympic Games on one occasion in 2000. Sydney, the capital city of New South Wales hosted the Summer Paralympics from 18 to 29 October 2000. There were 3879 participants from 123 countries across 19 sports and 550 events. Australia won the most medals with 149 overall.

Brisbane will host the 2032 Summer Paralympics.

== History ==
The Paralympic Games had their beginnings in the Stoke Mandeville Games, held at the Stoke Mandeville Hospital, a spinal hospital in the United Kingdom. The first Games was in 1948, originally designed for patients of the hospital. The first Australian representative was 19 year old Charlene Todman, who had travelled to the hospital due to a lack of suitable care for spinal injuries in Australia at the time, competing in Archery at the 1951 games.

The annual Stoke Mandeville Games would stage their first event in a new host city in 1960, with Rome hosting the 9th International Stoke Mandeville Games. The aim was to continue to host the annual games in Stoke Mandeville and every four years in a new host city, akin to the Summer Olympics, with the closing ceremony of the 1960 Summer Olympics also in Rome having occurred only six days earlier. Australia sent 12 representatives, with the team having to raise £10,000 to fund their travel. Representatives were also expected to compete in multiple events, with Ross Sutton who had been paralysed in a Tiger Moth crash two years earlier, earning Australia's first Gold Medal in Archery. Australia would leave with three Gold Medals.

Australia would send athletes to every subsequent Paralympic Games, including the 1976 Winter Paralympics, although due to the organisers only allowing amputees, blind or visually impaired athletes, Australia's only representative skier Ron Finneran was unable to compete due to childhood Polio having impaired a leg and arm. After arguing with Ludwig Guttmann, the head of the Paralympic movement, and almost coming to blows. Finneran carried the Australian flag at the opening ceremony and tested the courses before competition.

Australia hosted the 2000 Summer Paralympics in Sydney, topping the Medal tally for the first time with 63 golds and Brisbane is scheduled to host the 2032 Summer Paralympics.

== Summer Games ==
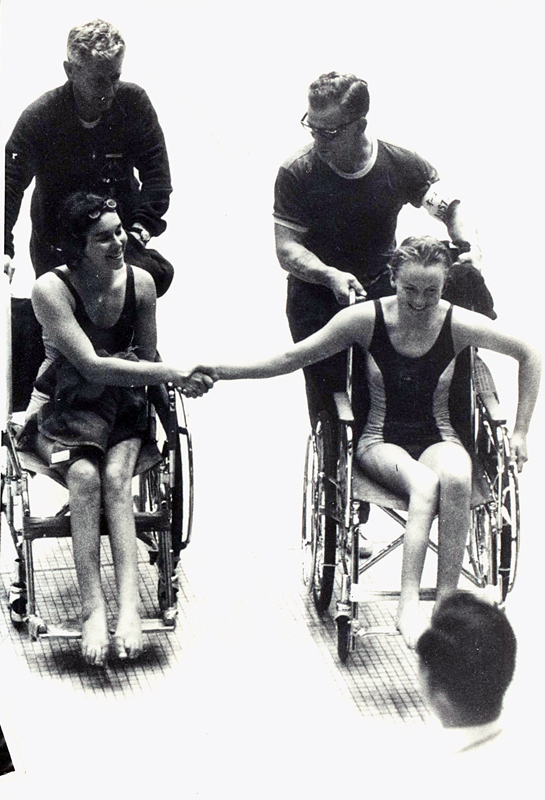
Daphne Ceeney and Elizabeth Edmondson shake hands after Edmondson won gold and Ceeney silver in the 50 m prone swimming event in Tokyo at the 1964 Summer Paralympic Games.

Host country (Australia)

=== Medal table ===
| Games | Gold | Silver | Bronze | Total | Rank | Competitors | Officials | Flag Bearer Opening | Flag Bearer Closing |
|---|---|---|---|---|---|---|---|---|---|
| 1960 Rome | 3 | 6 | 1 | 10 | 7 | 11 | | Kevin Betts | |
| 1964 Tokyo | 12 | 11 | 7 | 30 | 4 | 17 | 9 | Not a team member | |
| 1968 Tel-Aviv | 15 | 16 | 7 | 38 | 4 | 35 | 18 | | |
| 1972 Heidelberg | 6 | 9 | 10 | 25 | 11 | 37 | | Not a team member | |
| 1976 Toronto | 16 | 18 | 7 | 41 | 11 | 46 | | Not a team member | |
| 1980 Arnhem | 12 | 21 | 22 | 55 | 14 | 53 | | Not a team member | |
| 1984 Stoke Mandeville / New York | 49 | 54 | 50 | 153 | 8 | 108 | | Carol Young and Paul Bird (NY) Non team member (SM) | |
| 1988 Seoul | 23 | 34 | 38 | 95 | 10 | 175 | 47 | Paul Croft | Rodney Nugent |
| 1992 Barcelona and Madrid | 37 | 37 | 34 | 108 | 5 | 134 | | Terry Giddy | Priya Cooper |
| 1996 Atlanta | 42 | 37 | 27 | 106 | 2 | 161 | | Elizabeth Kosmala | Priya Cooper |
| 2000 Sydney | 63 | 39 | 47 | 149 | 1 | 286 | 148 | Brendan Burkett | Neil Fuller |
| 2004 Athens | 26 | 39 | 36 | 101 | 5 | 152 | | Louise Sauvage | Matthew Cowdrey |
| 2008 Beijing | 23 | 29 | 27 | 79 | 5 | 161 | 122 | Russell Short | Matthew Cowdrey |
| 2012 London | 32 | 23 | 30 | 85 | 5 | 160 | | Greg Smith | Evan O'Hanlon |
| 2016 Rio | 22 | 30 | 29 | 81 | 5 | 176 | | Brad Ness | Curtis McGrath |
| 2020 Tokyo | 21 | 29 | 30 | 80 | 8 | 179 | | Ryley Batt & Daniela di Toro | Ellie Cole |
| 2024 Paris | 18 | 17 | 27 | 62 | 9 | 159 | | Madison de Rozario & Brenden Hall | Lauren Parker & James Turner |
| Total | 420 | 449 | 429 | 1298 | | | | | |

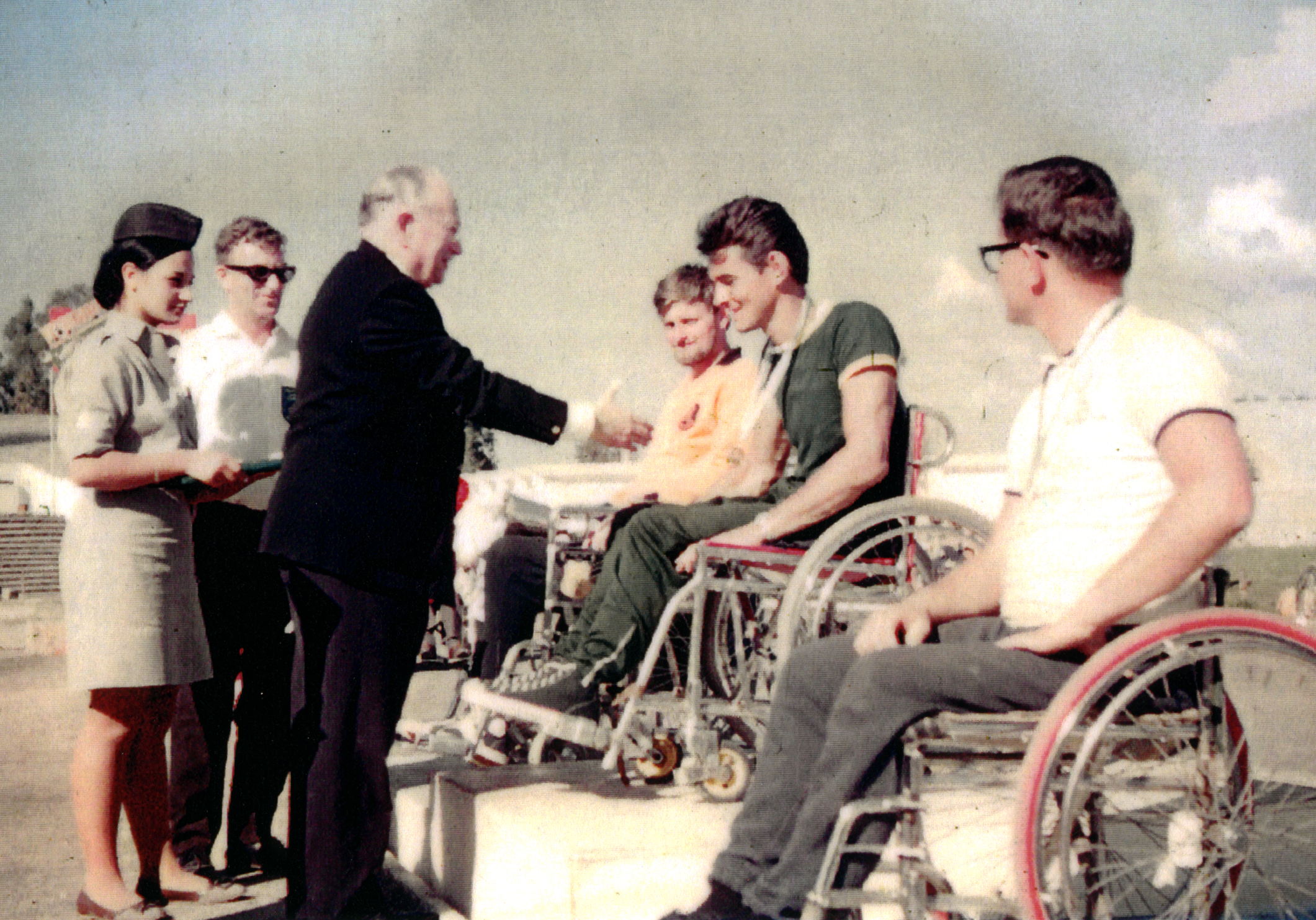
Tony South receives his gold medal for the archery Albion Round in Tel-Aviv at the 1968 Summer Paralympics from the founder of the Paralympic movement, Ludwig Guttmann.

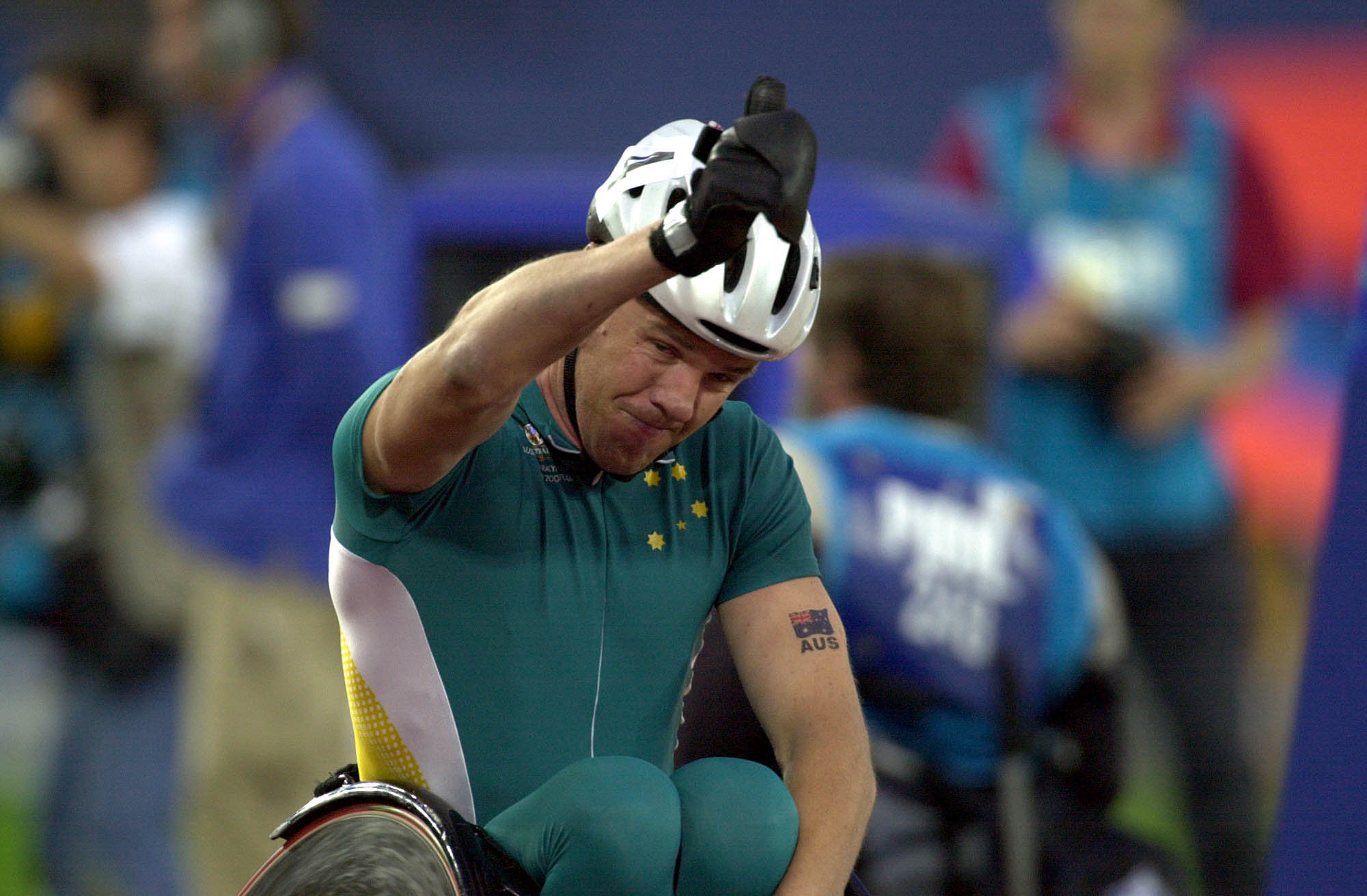
In Paralympic sport, Australia has been most successful in Athletics. Greg Smith gives the crowd a "thumbs up" after winning gold at the 800 m T52 final at the 2000 Summer Paralympic Games, in Sydney on Day 04.

=== Medals by summer sport 1960–2024 ===
| Sport | Gold | Silver | Bronze | Total |
|---|---|---|---|---|
| Athletics | 161 | 169 | 175 | 505 |
| Swimming | 153 | 175 | 175 | 503 |
| Cycling | 45 | 39 | 37 | 121 |
| Shooting | 15 | 7 | 3 | 25 |
| Lawn bowls | 8 | 7 | 6 | 21 |
| Table tennis | 6 | 7 | 6 | 19 |
| Powerlifting/Weightlifting | 4 | 8 | 5 | 17 |
| Wheelchair tennis | 4 | 5 | 3 | 12 |
| Paracanoe | 4 | 3 | 2 | 9 |
| Sailing | 4 | 2 | 1 | 7 |
| Archery | 3 | 9 | 4 | 16 |
| Equestrian | 3 | 1 | 5 | 9 |
| Wheelchair basketball | 2 | 5 | 1 | 8 |
| Wheelchair rugby | 2 | 2 | 1 | 5 |
| Triathlon | 2 | 1 | 0 | 3 |
| Rowing | 1 | 4 | 0 | 5 |
| Dartchery | 1 | 1 | 0 | 2 |
| Basketball ID | 1 | 0 | 0 | 1 |
| Judo | 1 | 0 | 0 | 1 |
| Boccia | 0 | 2 | 2 | 4 |
| Snooker | 0 | 1 | 1 | 2 |
| Wheelchair fencing | 0 | 1 | 1 | 2 |
| Taekwondo | 0 | 0 | 1 | 1 |
| Totals (23 entries) | 420 | 449 | 429 | 1,298 |

Includes the Australia at the 1992 Paralympic Games for Persons with Mental Handicap

Best results in non-medalling sports:

Summer
| Sport | Rank | Athlete | Event & Year |
| Badminton | 9th | Grant Manzoney | Men's singles WH2 in 2020 |
| Football 5-a-side | Did not participate | | |
| Goalball | 4th | Australia men's team | Men's tournament in 1996 |
| Volleyball | 8th | Australia men's team | Men's tournament in 2000 |

== Winter Games ==
=== Medal table ===
| Games | Gold | Silver | Bronze | Total | Rank | Competitors | Officials | Flag Bearer Opening | Flag Bearer Closing |
|---|---|---|---|---|---|---|---|---|---|
| 1976 Örnsköldsvik | 0 | 0 | 0 | 0 | - | 0*^{[^]} | 1 | Ron Finneran | |
| 1980 Geilo | 0 | 0 | 0 | 0 | - | 2 | | | |
| 1984 Innsbruck | 0 | 0 | 0 | 0 | - | 3 | | | |
| 1988 Innsbruck | 0 | 0 | 0 | 0 | - | 5 | | | |
| 1992 Tignes-Albertville | 1 | 1 | 2 | 4 | 12 | 5 | | | |
| 1994 Lillehammer | 3 | 2 | 4 | 9 | 9 | 6 | | | |
| 1998 Nagano | 1 | 0 | 1 | 2 | 16 | 4 | | James Patterson | |
| 2002 Salt Lake City | 6 | 1 | 0 | 7 | 8 | 6 | | Michael Milton | Bart Bunting |
| 2006 Turin | 0 | 1 | 1 | 2 | 13 | 10 | | Michael Milton | Toby Kane |
| 2010 Vancouver | 0 | 1 | 3 | 4 | 16 | 11 | | Toby Kane | Cameron Rahles-Rahbula |
| 2014 Sochi | 0 | 0 | 2 | 2 | 19 | 7 | | Cameron Rahles-Rahbula | Ben Tudhope |
| 2018 PyeongChang | 1 | 0 | 3 | 4 | 15 | 15 | | Joany Badenhorst | Melissa Perrine |
| 2022 Beijing | 0 | 0 | 1 | 1 | 17 | 9 | | Melissa Perrine; Mitchell Gourley | Ben Tudhope |
| 2026 Cortina | 0 | 1 | 1 | 2 | 21 | 14 | | Georgia Gunew; Ben Tudhope | Lauren Parker; Sean Pollard |
| Total | 12 | 7 | 18 | 37 | | | | | |

Notes: Ron Finneran attended and was expected to compete, carrying the flag during the opening ceremony, but due to the Paralympics lacking a limb impairment category other than amputee, he was excluded, and instead acted as an official at the games.

=== Medals by winter sport 1980–2026 ===
| Sport | Gold | Silver | Bronze | Total |
|---|---|---|---|---|
| Alpine skiing | 11 | 6 | 15 | 32 |
| Snowboarding | 1 | 1 | 3 | 5 |
| Totals (2 entries) | 12 | 7 | 18 | 37 |

== Summary of Australia's involvement ==
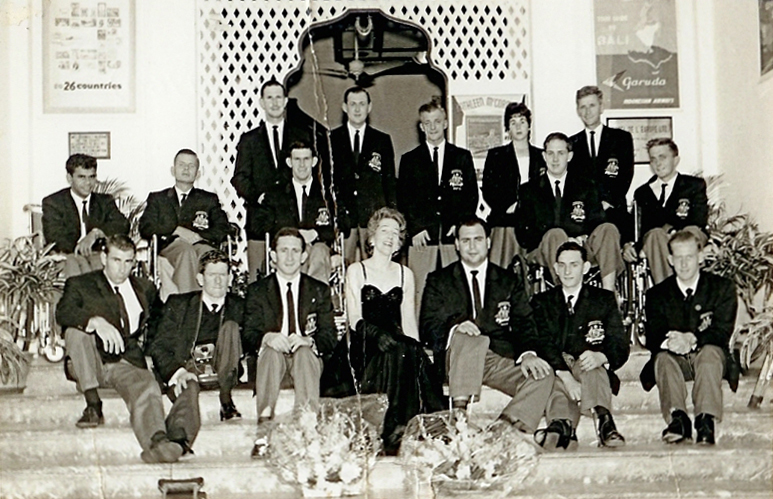
Australian team in Singapore en route to Rome for the 1960 Summer Paralympics.

=== 1960 Summer Paralympics ===
Athlete, Daphne Hilton (Ceeney) was Australia's first ever swimmer who competed at the Rome 1960 Games. This games were the only Paralympic Games in which Australia did not win a gold medal in athletics.

=== 1964 Summer Paralympics ===
With the games in Tokyo, Australia was able to send a large contingent of athletes as a result of the shorter than typical journey. Australia placed fourth with a total of 31 overall medals; 12 gold medals, 10 silver medals and 9 bronze medals.

=== 1968 Summer Paralympics ===
Australia placed fourth again, with 38 overall medals; 15 gold, 16 silver and 7 bronze. Lorraine Dodd was an outstanding athlete at these games, setting three Swimming records for her class, all on the same day.

=== 1972 Summer Paralympics ===
Australian won 25 medals - 6 gold, 9 silver and 10 bronze medals in six sports. Australia finished 11th on the gold medal table and 9th on the total medal table. Elizabeth "Libby" Kosmala competed in her first Paralympics, and won a bronze medal in swimming in the Women's 3x50 m Medley Relay 2–4 event, and participated in other swimming and athletics events.

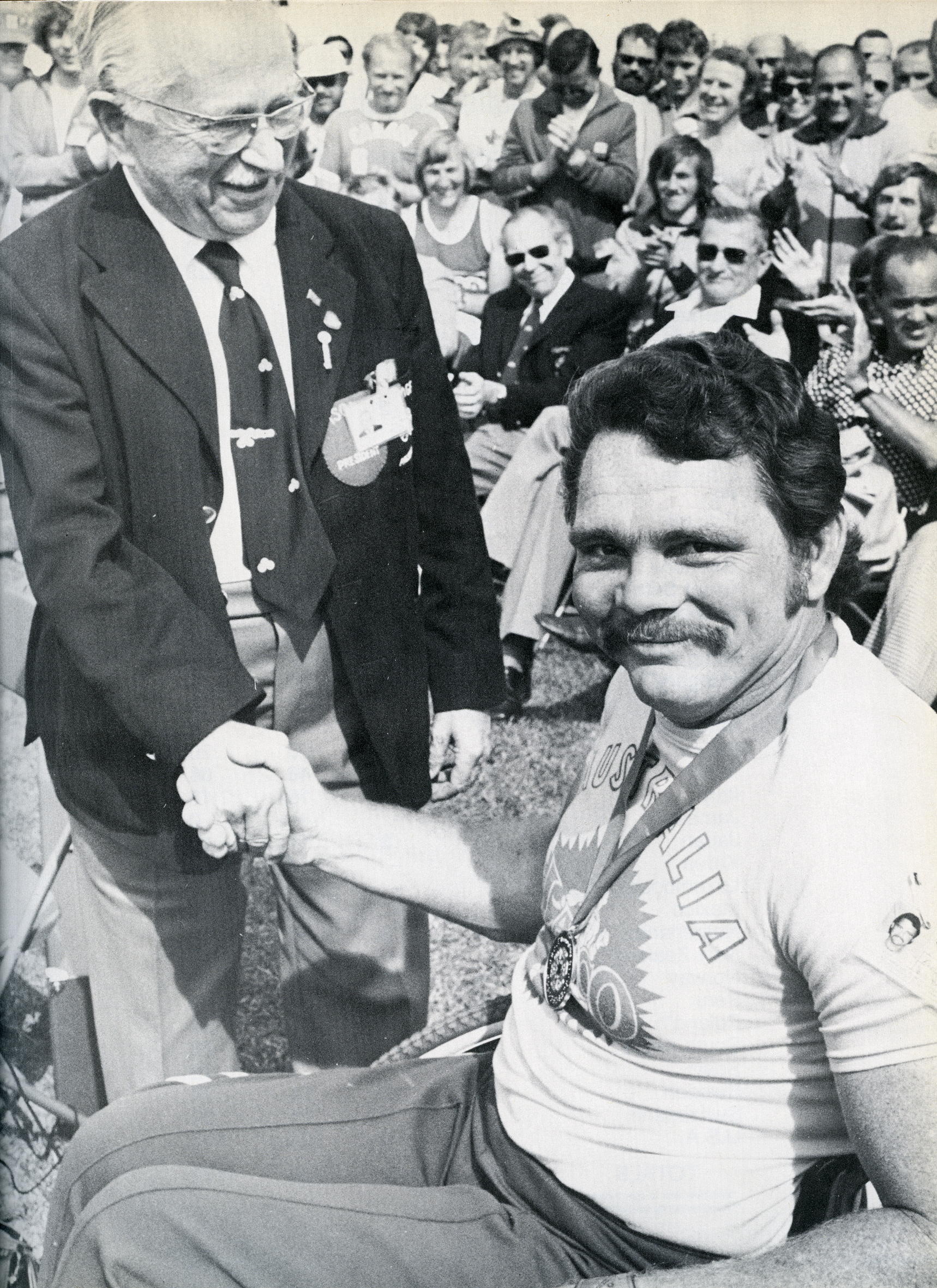
Australian athlete Eric Russell with Ludwig Guttmann at the 1976 Summer Paralympics

=== 1976 Summer Paralympics ===
The Olympic and Paralympic Games both aim to be apolitical; despite this, at the 1976 Paralympic Games, politics intruded into the games. Apartheid practices in South Africa brought controversy with the country's invitation to and inclusion in the games. Australian athlete, Eric Russell took a stance against politics at the Paralympic Games when he refused his gold medal in the class 3 discus event as a protest. He later accepted the medal from Dr Guttman after a press conference, explaining his position.

For the first time, television coverage of the Paralympics was broadcast daily to more than 600,000 viewers around the world.

=== 1976 Winter Paralympics ===
This Paralympic Games were the first Winter Paralympic Games. Australia was represented by one athlete, Ron Finneran; however, he was disqualified as his disability did not meet event classifications.

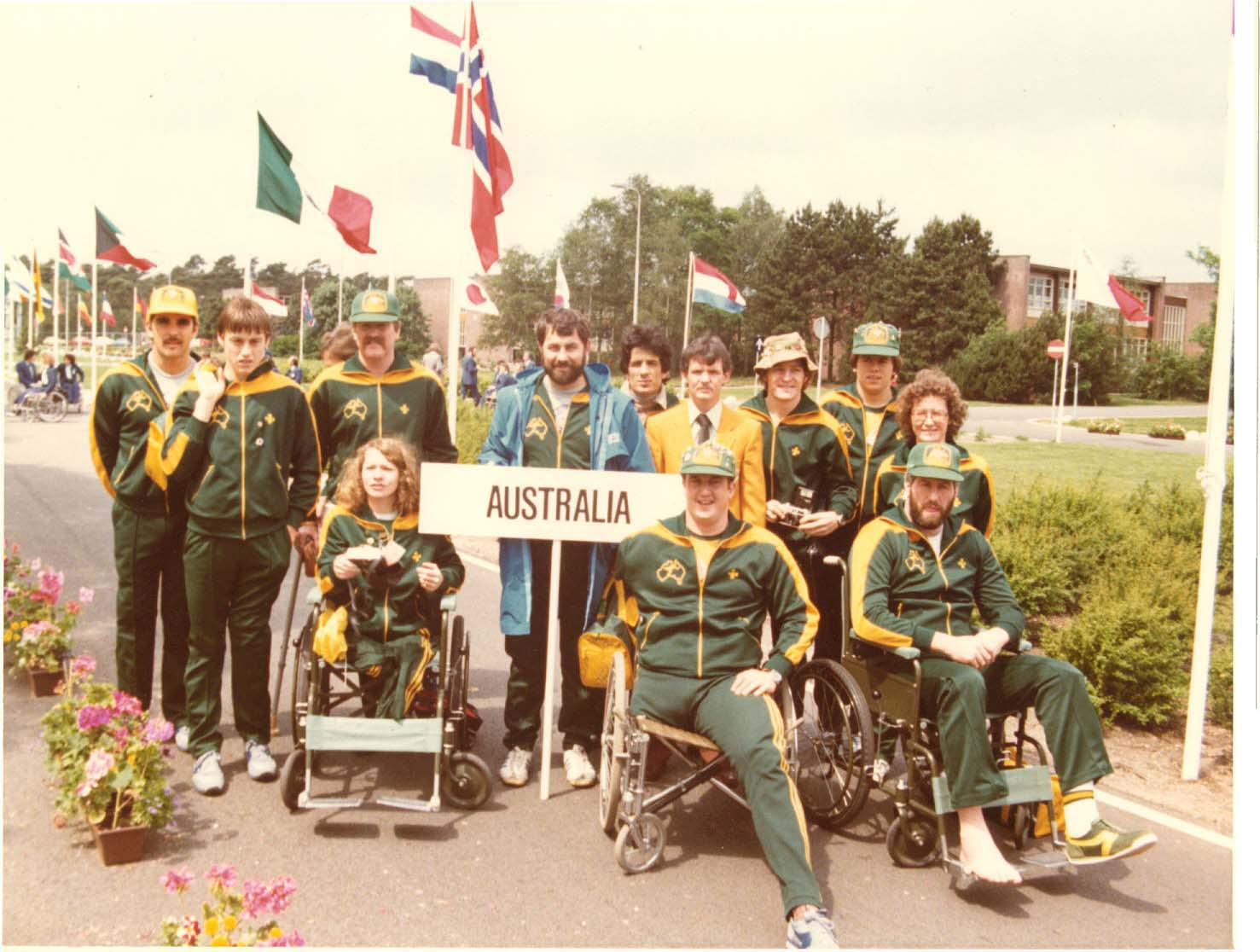
The Australian Team at the 1980 Summer Paralympic Games, in The Netherlands.

=== 1980 Winter Paralympics ===
This is the first Winter Paralympics that Australia competed in, but did not medal. Australia had two competitors, Kyrra Grunnsund and Peter Rickards, who participated in Slalom and Middle Distance Alpine Skiing respectively.

=== 1980 Summer Paralympics ===
It was the 6th Summer Paralympic game in which Australia competed. Australia won 55 medals – 12 gold, 21 silver and 22 bronze medals. Australia competed in 10 sports and won medals in 6 sports. It finished 14th on the gold medal table and 9th on the total medal table.

=== 1984 Winter Paralympics ===
Australia did not win a medal, but was strongly represented by Rodney Mills in cross-country and Kyrra Grunnsund and Andrew Temple in the alpine events of slalom, giant slalom and downhill.

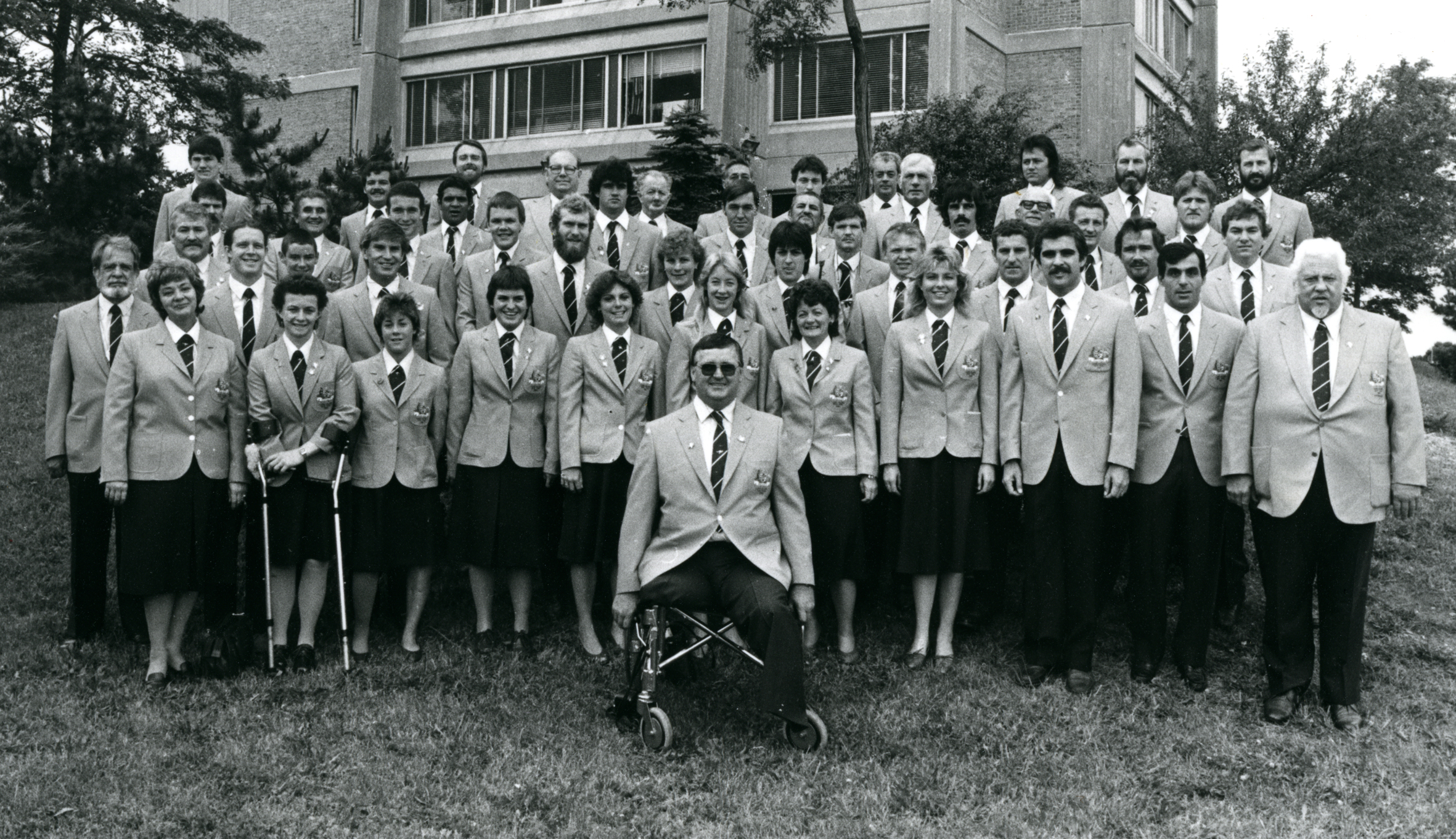
The Australian amputee team at the 1984 New York Paralympic Games.

=== 1984 Summer Paralympics ===
In 1984, Australia more than doubled its previous highest medal count with a tally of 154 medals. For the first time, four Cerebral Palsy athletes and one "Les Autres" athlete participated in the Games. Each won medals: Robert Walden (swimming) won four gold medals, Terry Biggs (table tennis) won a gold medal, Lyn Coleman (cycling) won silver medal and Malcom Chalmers (swimming) won a gold, silver and two bronze medals.

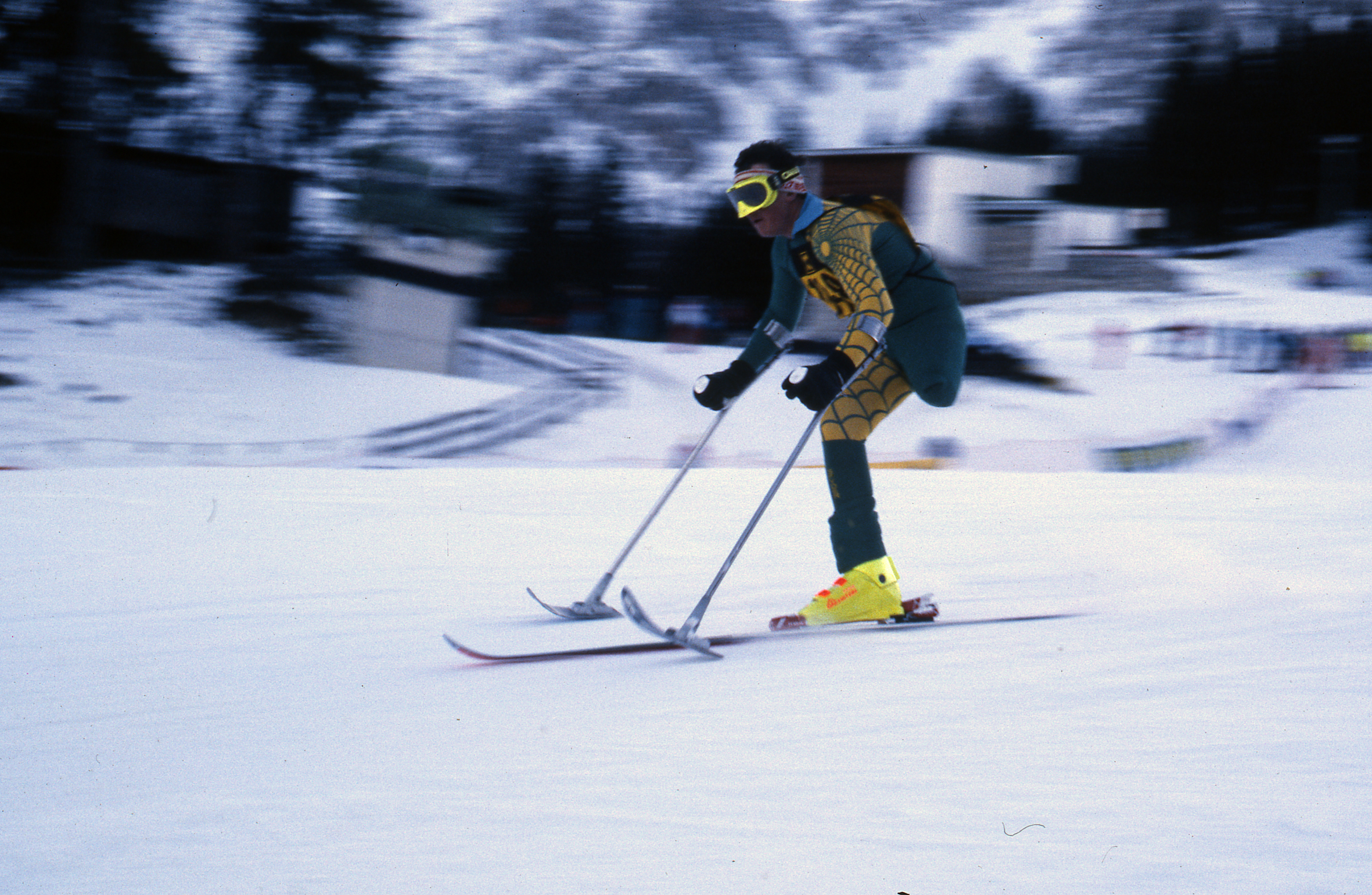
Michael Milton at the 1988 Winter Paralympics.

=== 1988 Winter Paralympics ===
Australia sent five athletes; however, failed to medal. These athletes were Michael Collins, Kyrra Grunnsund, Evan Hodge, Michael Milton and David Munk, who all competed in both men's downhill, men's giant slalom and men's slalom, except Munk who only competed in the latter two events.

=== 1988 Summer Paralympics ===
Australia competed in 16 events, achieving 23 gold medals in three sports, Athletics, Swimming and Lawn Bowls. Overall, Australia received 95 medals, 23 gold, 34 silver and 38 bronze. Australian athletes broke eight records during the Games.

=== 1992 Winter Paralympics ===
Australia's first ever gold medal at an Olympic or Paralympic Winter Games was won by Michael Milton when he won the LW2 Slalom event. There are no accurate results for the Australian Paralympic team performances at Winter Games previous to 1992; however, it is known that no-one medalled for Australia until the 1992 Paralympics.

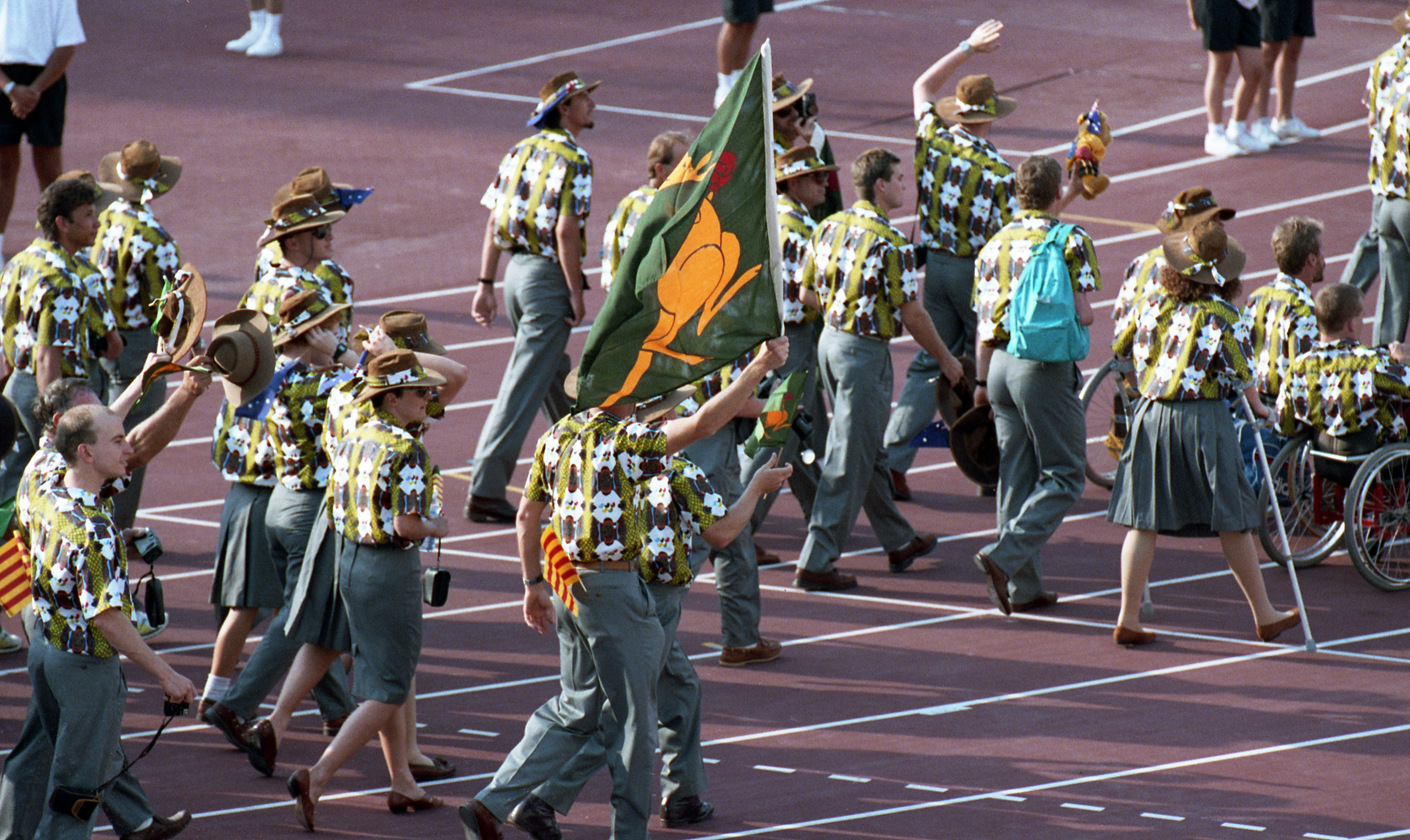
Australian Team marching at the opening ceremony at the Barcelona 1992 Paralympic Games

=== 1992 Summer Paralympics ===
The ID Australian men's swimming team was totally dominant in Madrid, with Joseph Walker being the undoubted star winning nine gold medals (five individual, four relay) from all events that him competed and setting two world records.

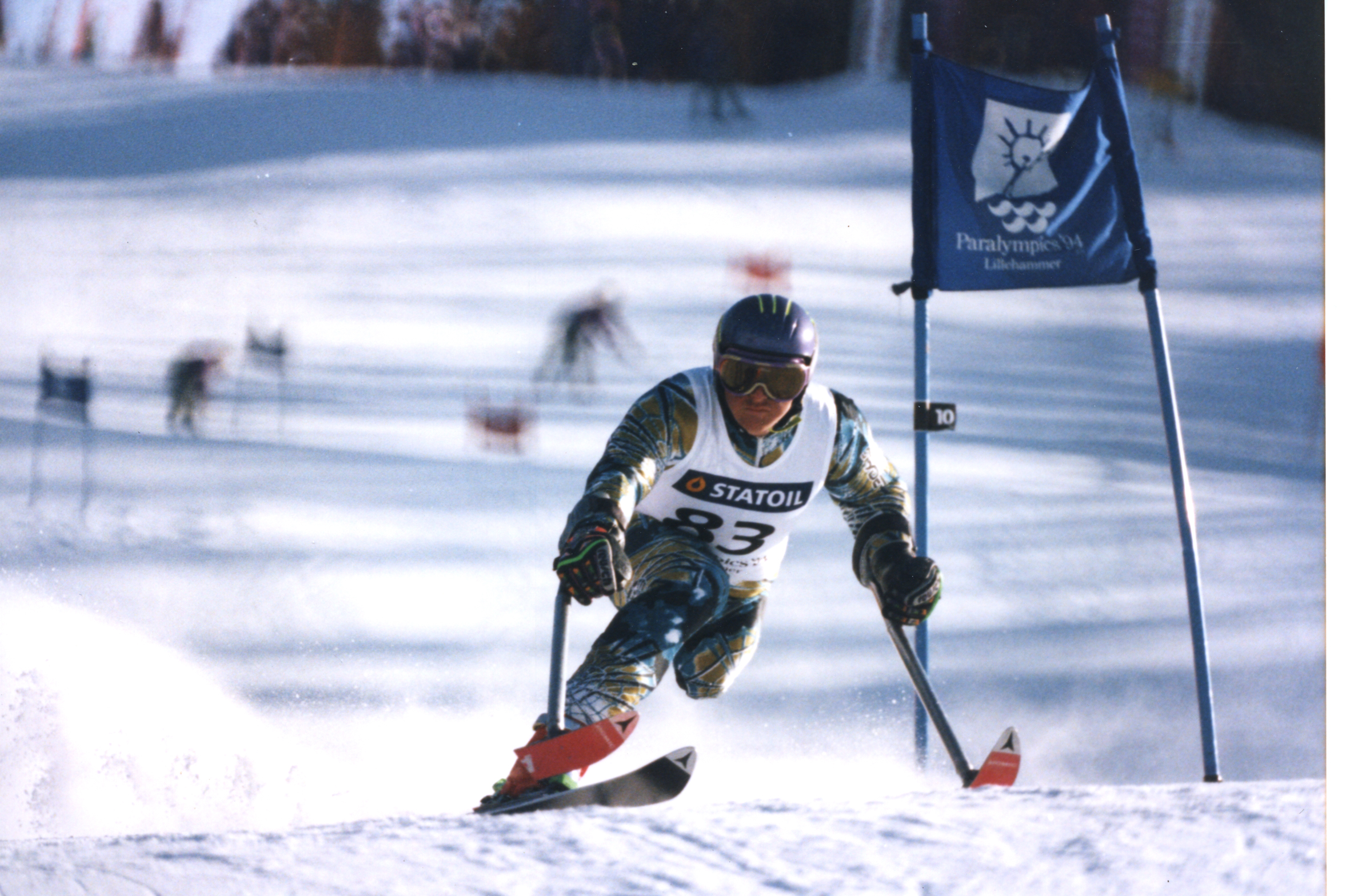
Australian Paralympian Michael Milton at the 1994 Winter Games in Lillehammer

=== 1994 Winter Paralympics ===
Australia's most successful Winter Paralympic Games remain the 1994 Winter Paralympic Games, when five athletes took the podium on 9 different occasions.

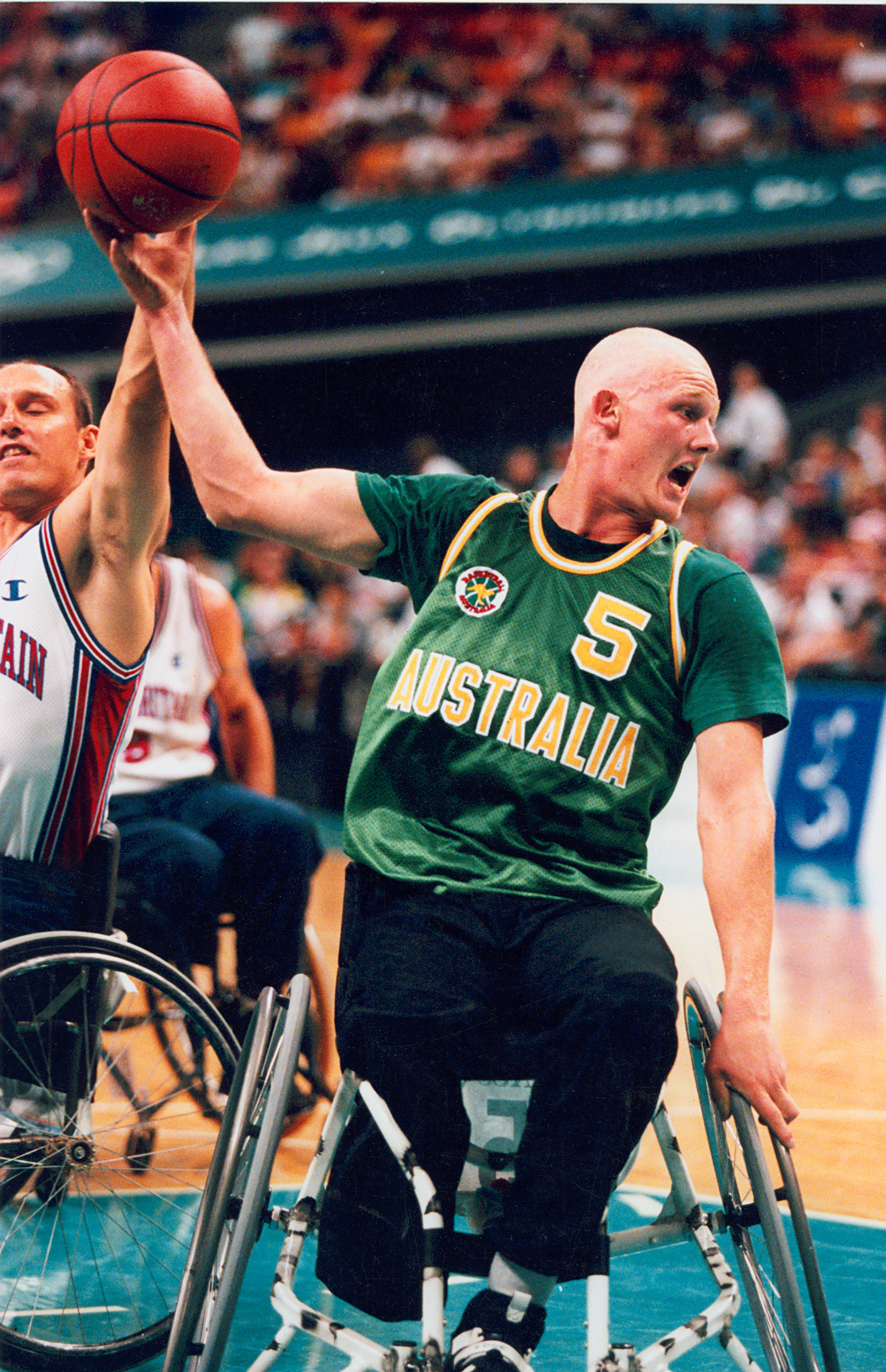
Australian men's wheelchair basketballer Troy Sachs as he passes the ball in the gold medal game against Great Britain at the 1996 Paralympic Games

=== 1996 Summer Paralympics ===
Australia was ranked 2nd in the final medal table with 106 overall medals; 42 gold; 37 silver; 27 bronze. This success has been attributed to the introduction of the Australian Paralympic Committee's Paralympic Preparation Program. Australia's team was half that of the host nation who lead the final medal table.

In the Wheelchair Basketball match, Australia vs Great Britain, Troy Sachs recorded the highest number of individual points scored. Sachs scored 42 points in a single game for Australia at the Atlanta 1996 Paralympic Games, which remains the highest ever individual score by a basketballer at the Paralympic Games. He is also Australia's most awarded basketballer with two gold and one silver medal.

At the Atlanta Summer Paralympics, there was the largest athletics away gold medal haul to date of 19 Gold medals.

=== 1998 Winter Paralympics ===
Australia collected two medals, one gold and one bronze, from the 1998 Games after sending four competitors. James Patterson competed in Alpine Skiing, winning gold in the men's downhill and bronze in men's slalom.

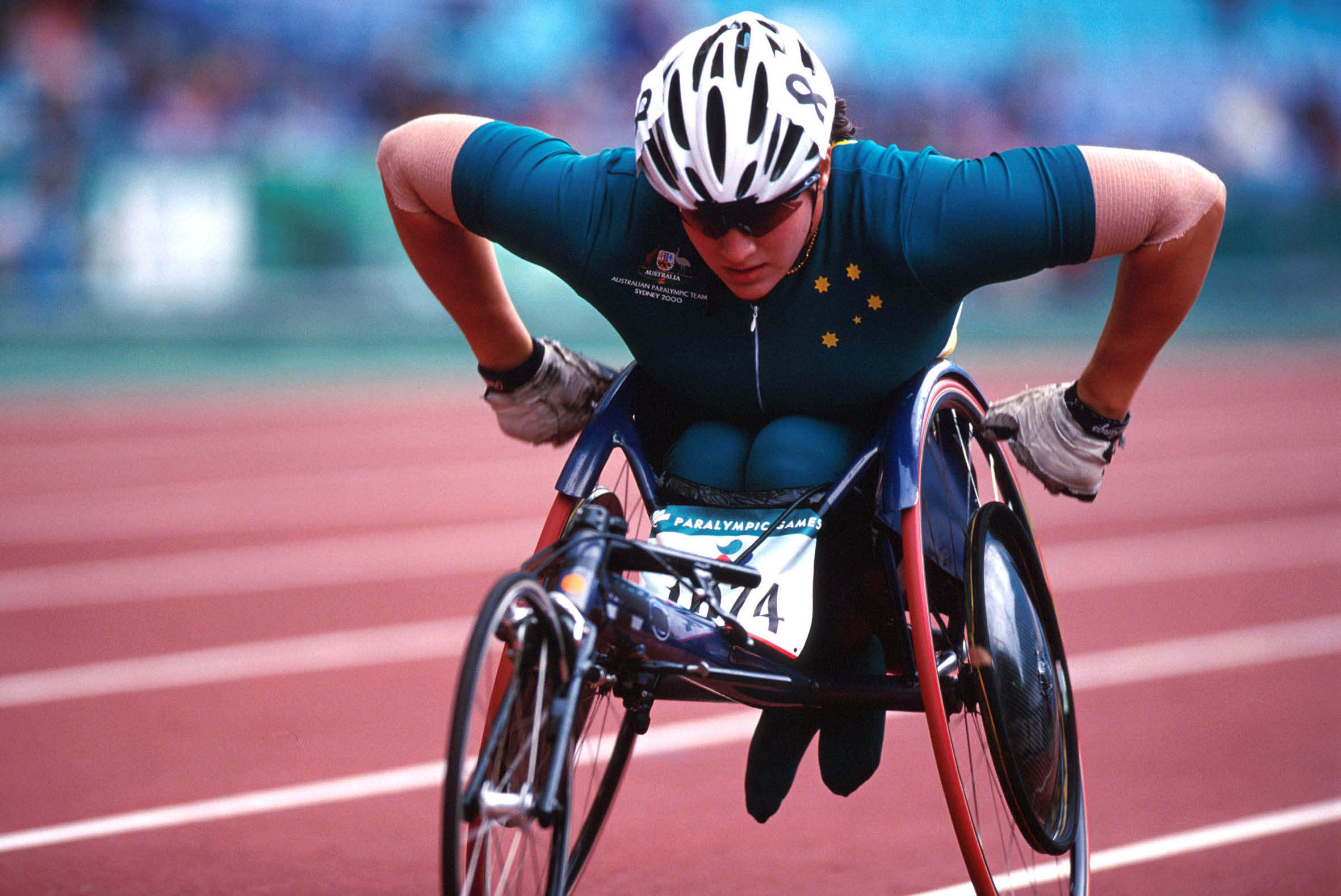
Louise Sauvage in action at the 2000 Paralympic Games in Sydney

=== 2000 Summer Paralympics ===
The 2000 Sydney Summer Paralympic Games are Australia's most successful Paralympic games to date. In the final medal tally, Australia was ranked first with 149 overall medals; 63 gold, 39 silver, and 47 bronze medals. Australia was represented by their largest team ever. The success of the team combined with extensive media coverage went a long way to changing public attitudes towards Paralympic athletes and understanding them as elite sportspeople.

Australian values were represented throughout the opening and closing ceremonies with a distinctly Aboriginal feel at the opening ceremony and a party atmosphere to the closing ceremony. At the opening ceremony, the Paralympic flame was lit by Louise Sauvage, one of Australia's biggest Paralympic athletes.

Sauvage and Tim Sullivan both competed in this games and found outstanding success in their individual events. Sullivan is Australia's most successful athletics athlete at a single Games, winning five gold medals in Sydney 2000.

=== 2002 Winter Paralympics ===
Australia's best performance at Winter Paralympics winning six gold and one bronze medal at the 2002 Winter Paralympics. Of these medals, four were won by Michael Milton. Milton becoming the first athlete in his class to claim a clean sweep of gold medals across the four alpine disciplines when he won gold in all four of his events – Downhill, slalom, giant slalom, and super-G.

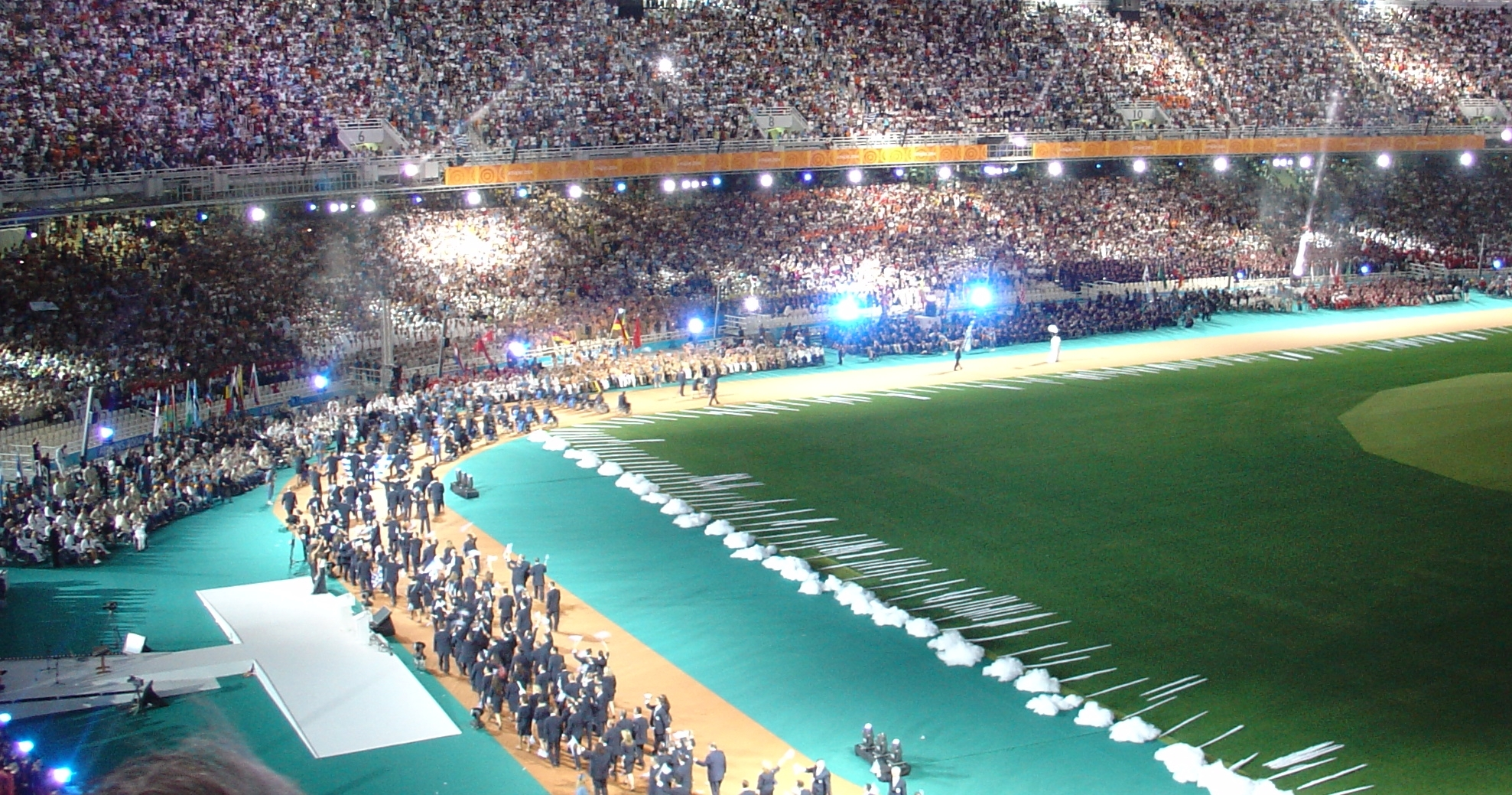
Paralympics Opening Ceremony in Athens at the 2004 Summer Paralympics.

=== 2004 Summer Paralympics ===
At the 2004 Paralympics, Australia was represented by a considerably smaller team than that of the 2000 Summer Paralympics in Sydney; however, ranked second overall medals behind China. The reduced team number was as a result of a strict selection criterion set by the APC and sports meant that only athletes with the potential to win a medal were on the Australian team.

=== 2006 Winter Paralympics ===
Australia took 10 athletes to compete in 3 sports and acquired a silver and a bronze medal to finish equal 13th on the overall medal table. Michael Milton won a silver medal in his event in his fifth and final Winter Paralympic Games, retiring as Australia's most successful Winter Paralympian ever. Emily Jansen competed, as Australia's first female competitor at a Winter Paralympics, in two of the four alpine events.

=== 2008 Summer Paralympics ===
Australia ranked fourth overall behind China, Great Britain, and USA in the gold medal table. The Beijing Games were the biggest ever with more athletes and countries competing across more sports than ever before. Australia sent their biggest delegation to an away Games to date with 167 athletes, 95 males and 72 females, who competed in 13 out of the 20 sports contested. Rowing was added to the Paralympic program with the Australian doubles crew winning silver. Timothy Sullivan became Australia's leading gold medallist in Paralympic History, winning 10 gold medals.

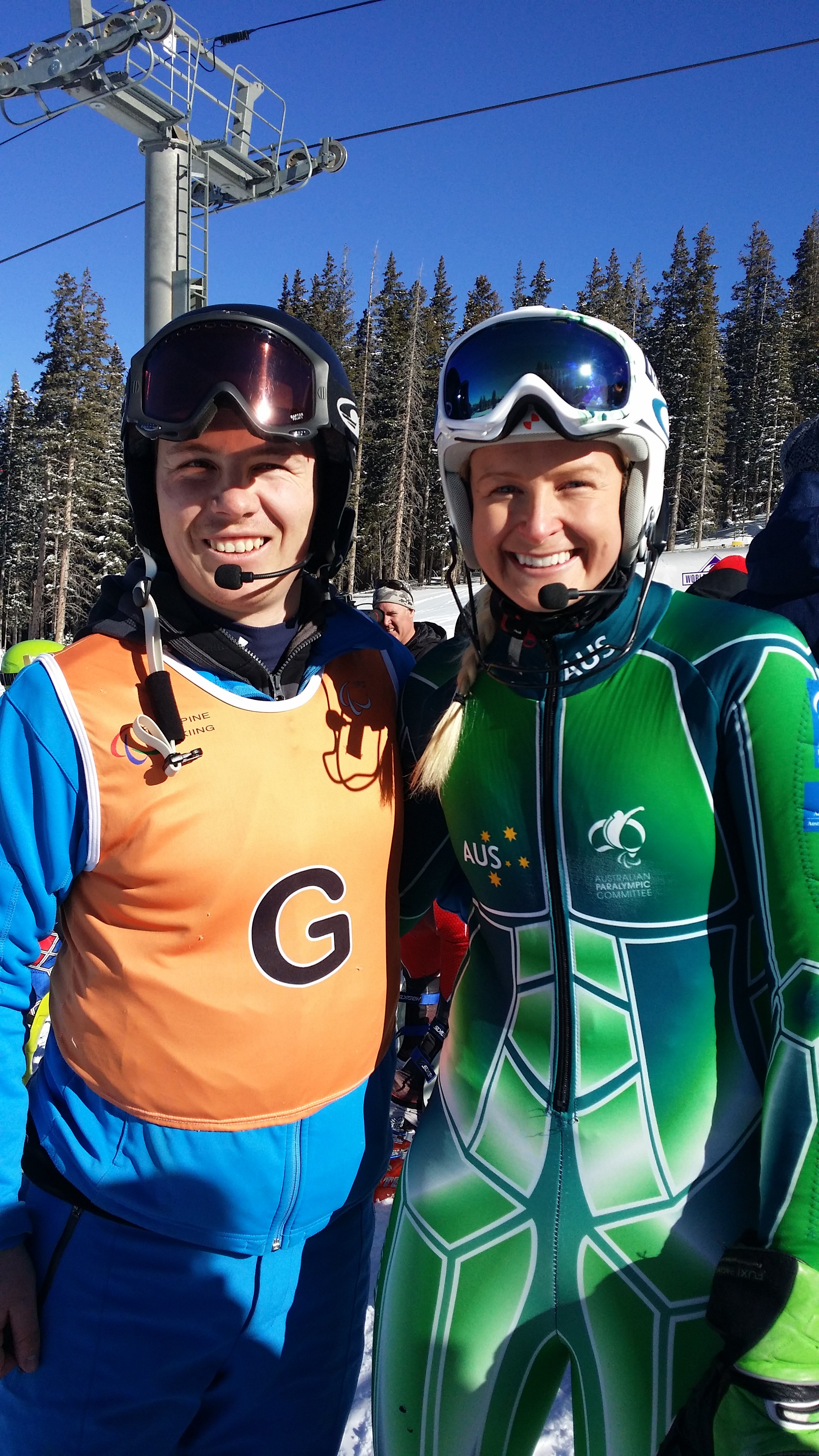
Australian Skier Jessica Gallagher (right) and guide Christian Geiger (left), 2014 Australian Paralympic Team Athlete.

=== 2010 Winter Paralympics ===
Australia took its largest team to date, of 14 athletes and their guides, to the 2010 Paralympic Winter Games. Despite the large team, Australia finished 16th on the overall medal tally, winning four medals. Australia had their first Australian female to win a medal at the Paralympic Winter Games, when Jessica Gallagher won bronze in the slalom.

=== 2012 Summer Paralympics ===
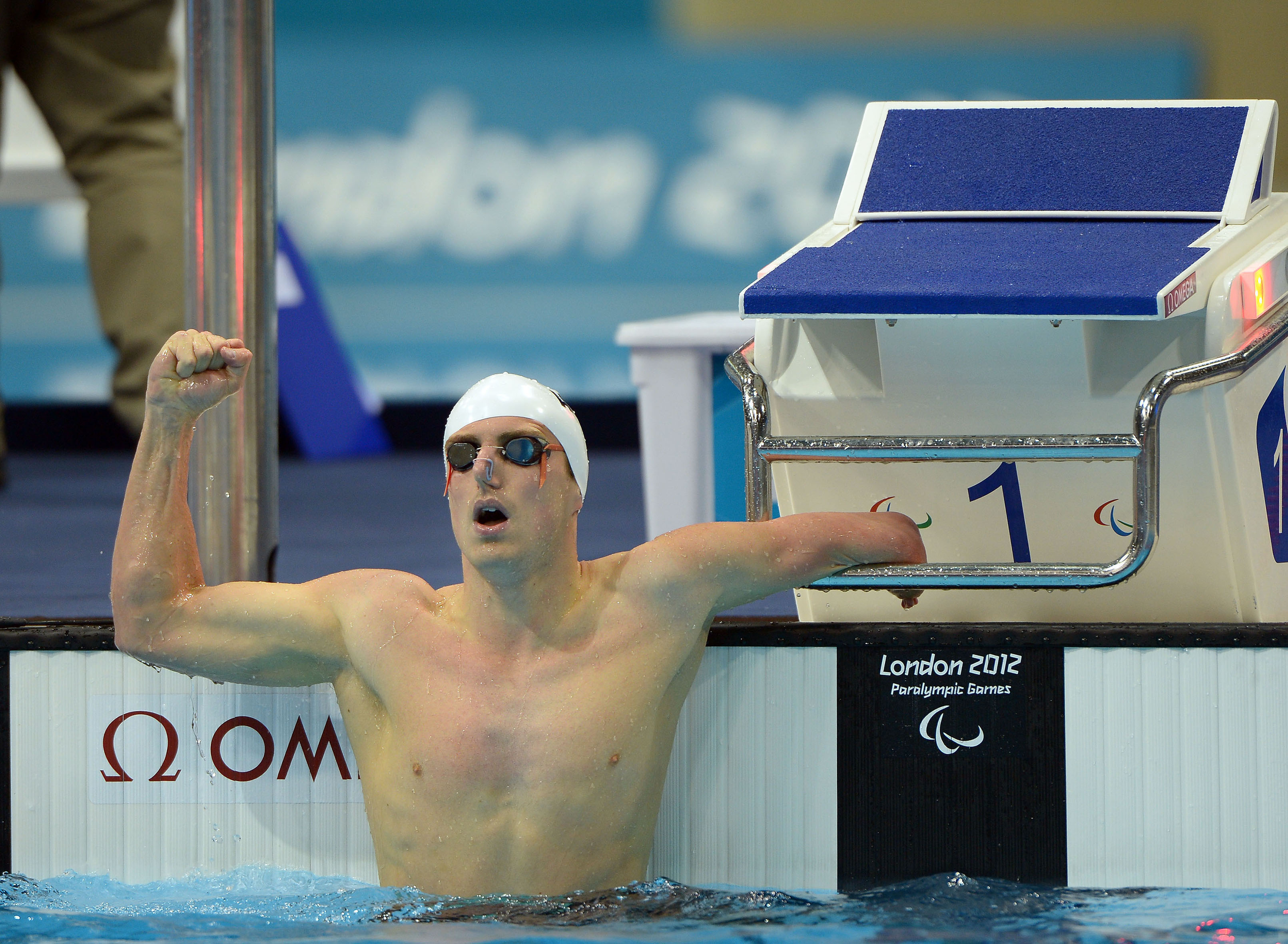
Australian Paralympic team member Matthew Cowdrey at the 2012 Summer Paralympic Games in London

Australia finished fifth in the medal tally with 32 gold, 23 silver and 30 bronze medals, which medals that were won in nine of the 13 sports contested by Australian athletes. Australia achieved 16 world records and 35 Paralympic Records with performances from such athletes as: Todd Hodgetts (Shot Put), Kelly Cartwright (Long Jump), Susan Powell (Individual Pursuit), Bradley Mark (10m Air Rifle), Brenden Hall (400m Freestyle) and Blake Cochrane (100m Breaststroke). In total Australia had 93 medallists of which 25 were multi-medallists, while gold medallist there was 40 and eight of these were multi-gold medallists.

London was the best performance by Australia's Paralympic swim team since 1984. Men's 4 × 100 m Freestyle Relay swim team achieved Australia's 1000th Summer Paralympic Games medal (Australia's 41st of the Games).

Jacqueline Freney was the most successful athlete from any nation, winning eight gold medals from eight events while her swimming teammate Matthew Cowdrey became the most successful Australian Paralympian of all-time by winning his 13th career gold medal at his third Games. Matthew Cowdrey won gold on day seven in Men's 50m Freestyle S9 Final, also breaking the world record which still stands at 25.13seconds. The victory gave Cowdrey (SA) his 13th career gold medal from three Games.

The Australian wheelchair rugby team won its first Paralympic gold medal after claiming silver at the last two major tournaments (Beijing 2008, World Champs 2010).

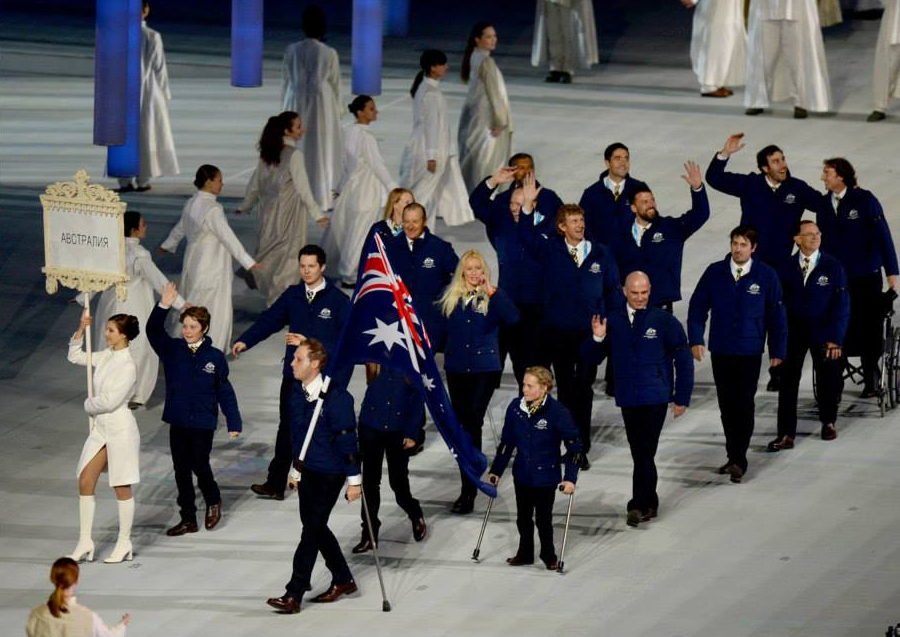
The Australian Team marches at the Opening Ceremony of the Sochi 2014 Paralympic Winter Games, led by flagbearer Cameron Rahles-Rahbula.

The youngest competitor in the London Games, 13-year-old & 300 days Maddison Elliott from Newcastle, NSW, won one gold, one silver, and two bronze medals and presented Prince Harry, Duke of Sussex with the Australian's Paralympic team's toy mascot “Lizzie”, a frill-necked Lizard.

=== 2014 Winter Paralympics ===
Australia came away from these games with two medals, a disappointing result. Australian Paralympic Chief Executive Jason Hellwig said that 'we were absolutely disappointed we didn't get the mission done to win that gold medal', however, he also described it as the most satisfying he had experienced because of the hardship the team had gone through. A possible reason for the Australian Team's disappointing performance was the death of team member Matthew Robinson, some weeks prior to the Games after an accident at the IPC Alpine Skiing World Cup in La Molina, Spain.

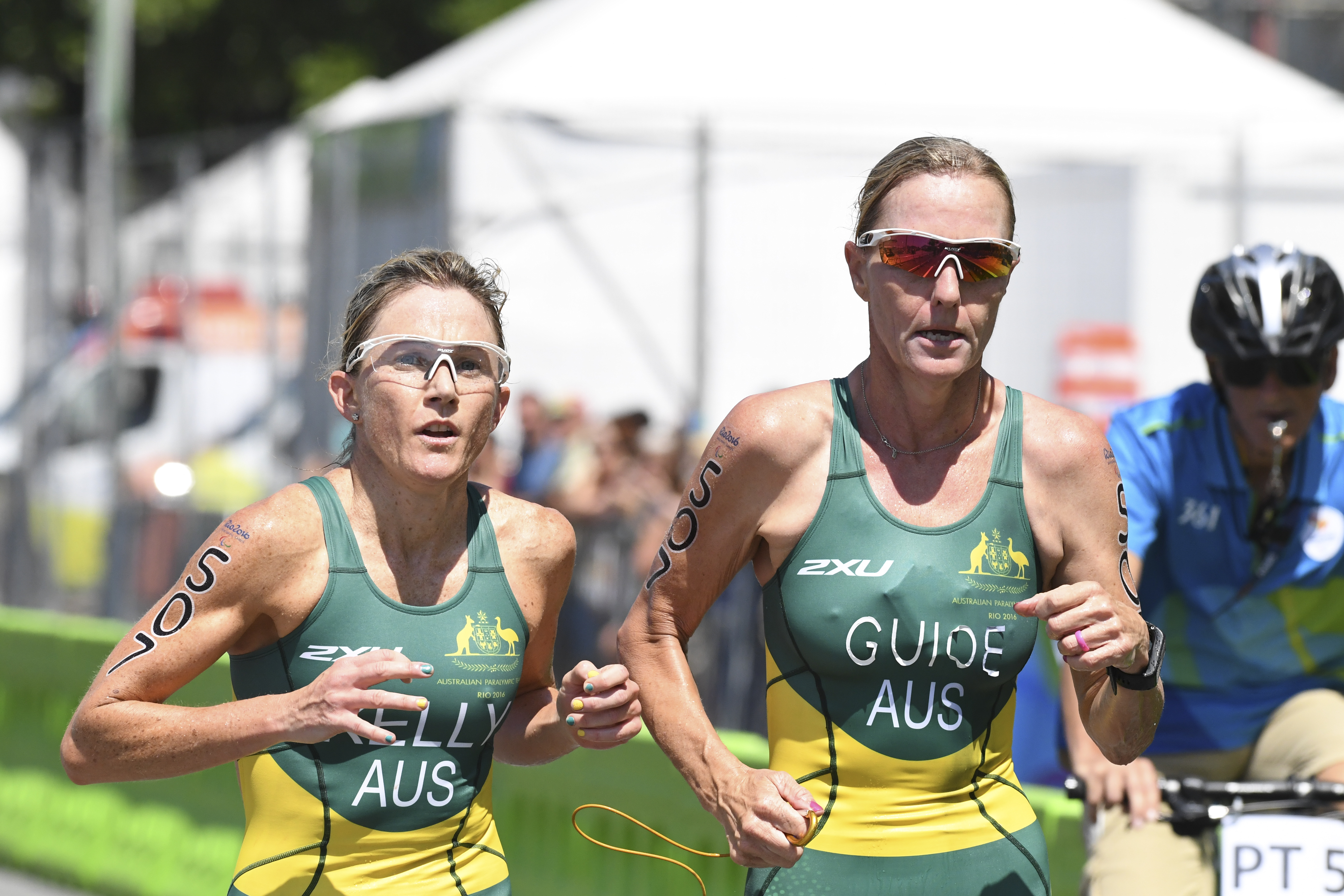
Katie Kelly & her guide Michellie Jones competing in Paratriathlon class PT4, PT2 e PT5, in Copacabana Beach, Rio at the 2016 Summer Paralympics.

=== 2016 Summer Paralympics ===
The Australian team comprised 177 athletes of which 103 are men and 74 are women. Incredibly 89 athletes (50%) made their Paralympic debut in 2016. The average age of athletes on the Aussie team 2016 is 29.2 years. The average age of the male athletes is 29.1 years and the average age of female athletes is 29.4 years.

In Rio there were an extraordinary eight Australian athletes who had competed in two or more different sports:

- Dylan Alcott competed in his third Paralympic games in two different sports, wheelchair basketball in 2008 and 2012 and wheelchair tennis. Alcott was successful in his transition from wheelchair basketball to wheelchair tennis, winning two gold medals in both the men's quad wheelchair tennis doubles and singles. He became the fifth Australian Paralympian to win gold medals in two sports.
- Daniela Di Toro competed in her sixth Paralympics, having competed in wheelchair tennis from 1996 to 2012, winning a silver and bronze medal each in 2000 and 2004 respectively. At the Rio Paralympics, Daniela competed in table tennis.
- Jessica Gallagher won bronze in her fourth Paralympics in a third Paralympic sport, cycling, after competing in alpine skiing (2010 and 2014 winning bronze both times), and athletics (2012).
- At 74 years of age, Libby Kosmala was the oldest athlete selected for the 2016 Summer Paralympics. The Rio Paralympics was Kosmala's twelfth Games, having previously competed in athletics, swimming, and shooting at the Paralympic Games since 1972. Kosmala won 9 gold, 3 silver and 1 bronze medals over that time.
- Claire McLean competed in Paratriathlon in Rio but had previously competed in cycling at the 2004 Athens Paralympics, placing silver.
- Kieran Modra won bronze in the men's B road time trial in his eighth Paralympics, having competed in athletics in 1988, swimming in 1992 (winning 2 bronze), and cycling from 1996 to 2016 (winning 5 golds, and 2 silvers in that time).
- Previously, Liesl Tesch competed in wheelchair basketball from 1992 to 2008 (winning 2 silver and 1 bronze medals). In 2012 and 2016, Tesch transitioned to sailing, winning a gold medal each time.
- Amanda Reid medalled silver in cycling in Rio after previously swimming in London.

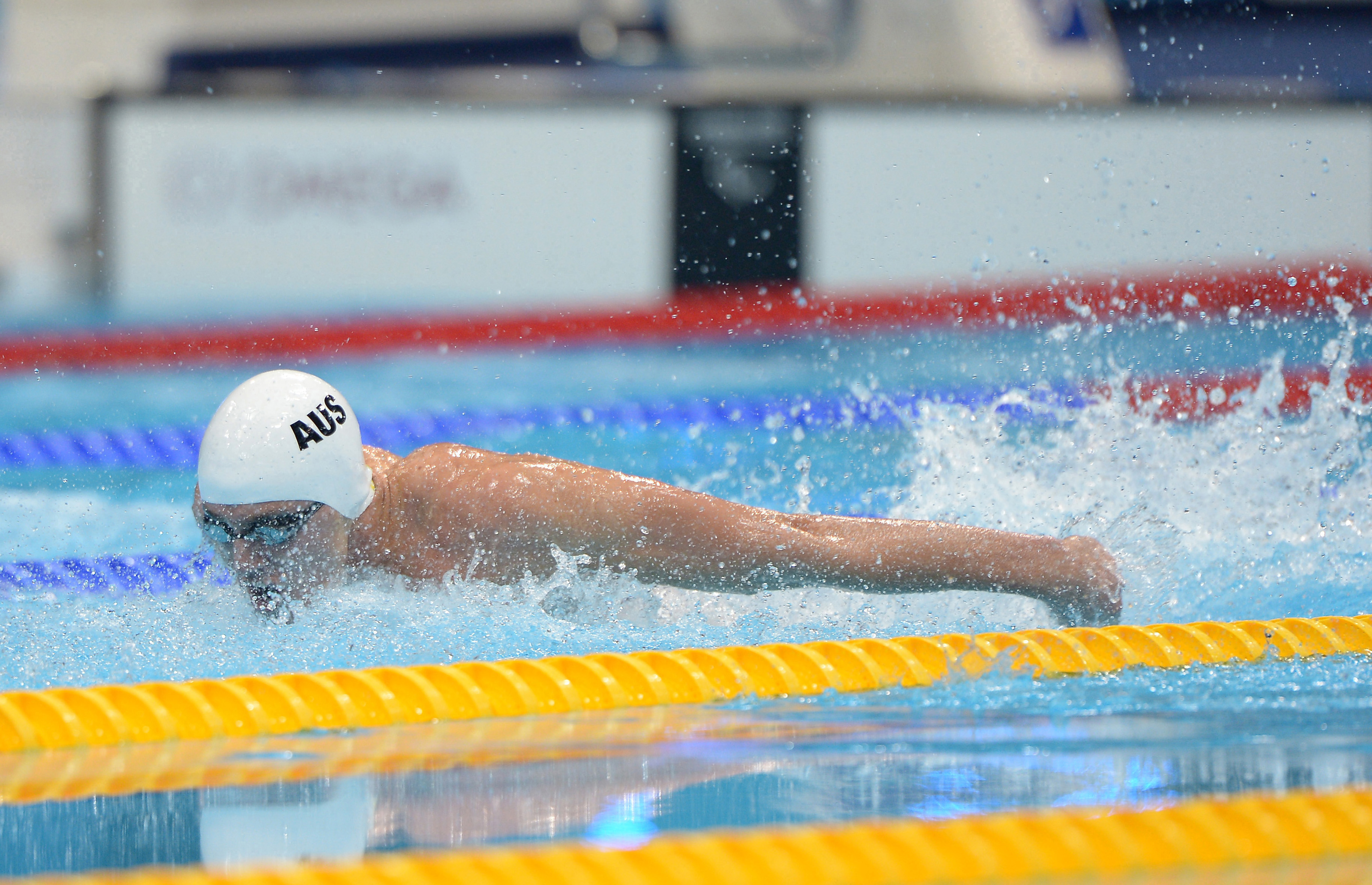
Australian Paralympic team member Brenden Hall at the 2012 Summer Paralympic Games in London.

Notable achievements at the Games

- Australia won its first medal in archery since 1968, when Jonathon Milne won bronze in the men's archery individual compound W1.
- Paracanoe was debuted at the Rio 2016 Summer Paralympics and resulted in Curtis McGarth becoming Australia's first gold medallist in the sport. Paratriathlon also debuted, resulting in Katie Kelly and her guide Michellie Jones won the gold medal.
- Back-to-back winners of their events from the London 2012 Paralympic Games were: Ellie Cole (swimming), Brenden Hall (swimming), David Nicholas (cycling), Carol Cooke (cycling), Daniel Fitzgibbon / Liesl Tesch (sailing) and the wheelchair rugby team.

=== 2018 Winter Paralympics ===
Team of 12 athletes and three guides represented Australia. In snowboarding Simon Patmore won a gold and bronze medal and in alpine skiing Melissa Perrine won two bronze medals. Australia was ranked 15th on the medal table.

=== 2020 Summer Paralympics ===
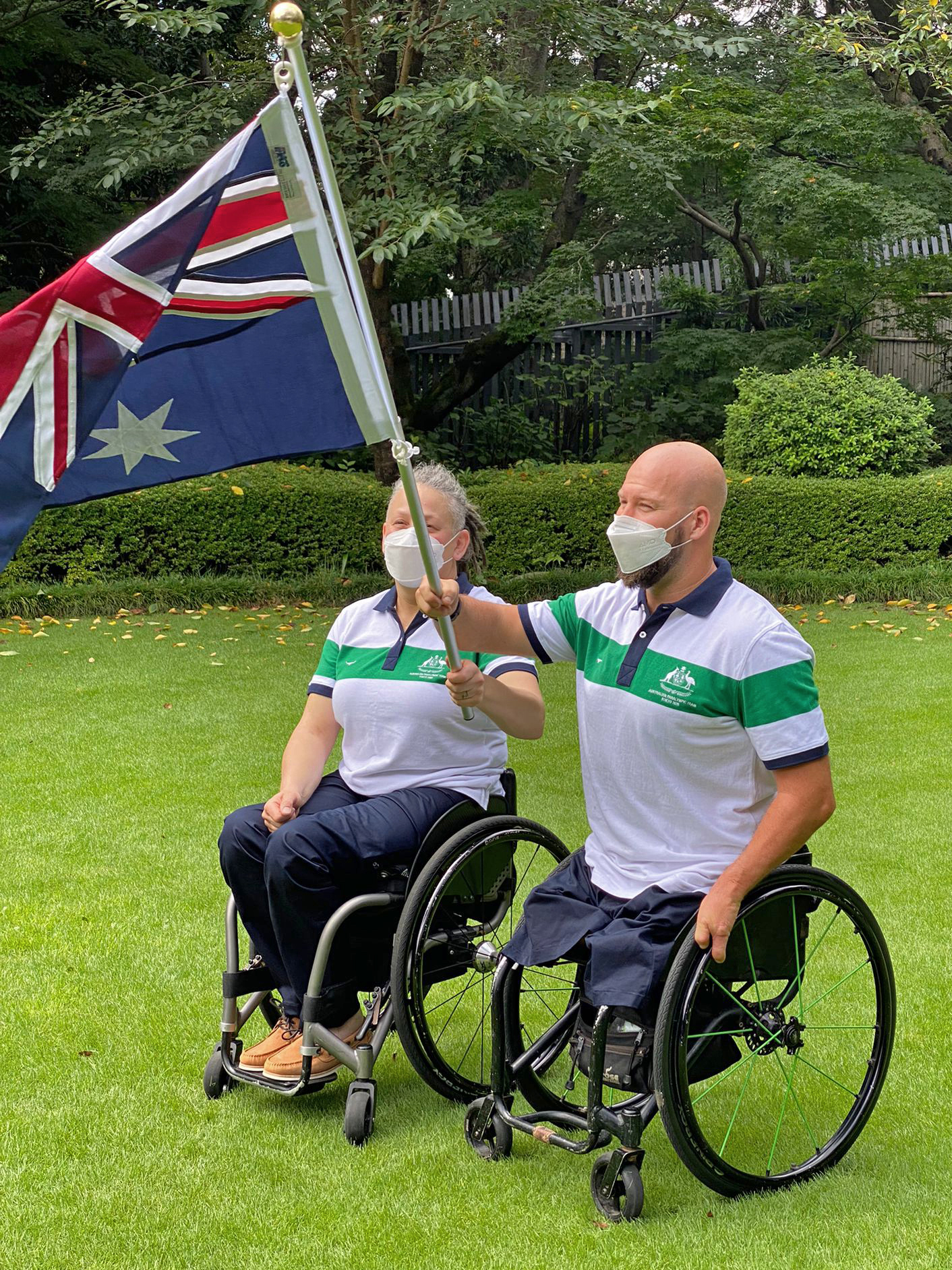
Daniela di Toro and Ryley Batt at the announcement that they would jointly carry the Australian flag in the opening ceremony at the Tokyo Paralympics.

Australia sent its largest away team - 179 athletes to a Summer Paralympics. Australia finished eighth on the gold medal table and sixth on the total medals table. The Games were postponed one year due to the COVID-19 pandemic. Badminton and taekwondo made their Paralympic debuts.

- Multiple gold medallists: William Martin (swimming) - 3 gold, 1 silver; Madison de Rozario (athletics) - 2 gold, 1 bronze; Curtis McGrath (canoeing) - 2 gold; Ben Popham (swimming) - 2 gold, 1 silver; Rowan Crothers (swimming) - 2 gold, 1 silver.
- Ellie Cole with two bronze medals became Australia's leading female Paralympic medallist with 17 medals - 6 gold, 5 silver, 6 bronze.
- Gold medallists repeating Rio Paralympics gold - James Turner (athletics), Vanessa Low (athletics), Curtis McGrath (canoeing), Lakeisha Patterson (swimming), Rachael Watson (swimming), Dylan Alcott (wheelchair tennis).

=== 2022 Winter Paralympics ===
Team of 7 athletes and two guides represented Australia. In snowboarding Ben Tudhope won a bronze medal. Australia was ranked 17th on the medal table.

== Interesting facts ==
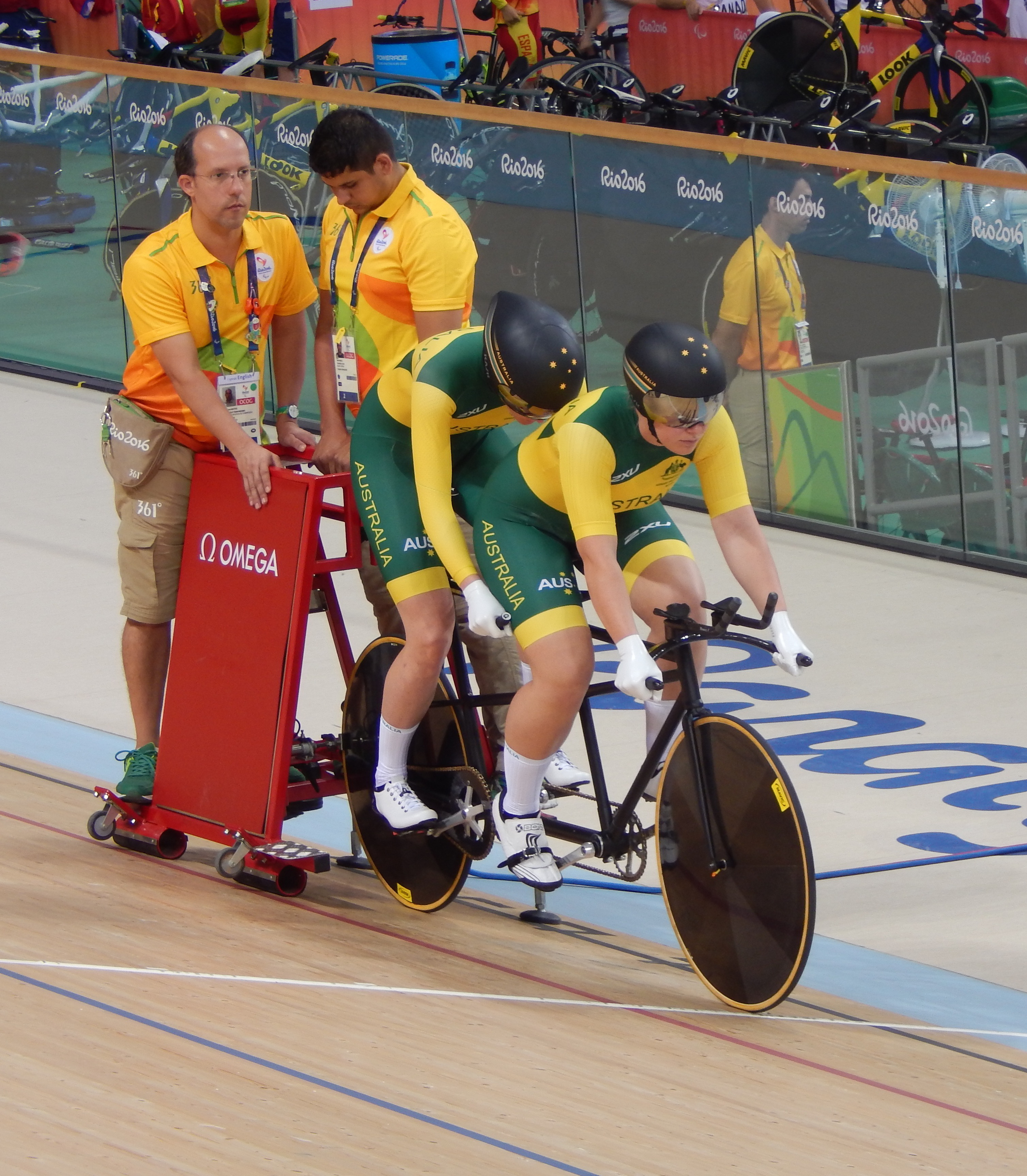
Jessica Gallagher (left) and Madison Janssen (right) prepare to race in the Women's B/VI 1000m time trial final in Rio at the 2016 Summer Paralympics.

Leading Australian Summer Paralympians 1960–2020

| Athlete | Gold | Silver | Bronze | Total |
|---|---|---|---|---|
| Matthew Cowdrey | 13 | 7 | 3 | 23 |
| Timothy Sullivan | 10 | 0 | 0 | 10 |
| Louise Sauvage | 9 | 4 | 0 | 13 |
| Priya Cooper | 9 | 3 | 4 | 16 |
| Libby Kosmala | 9 | 3 | 1 | 13 |
| Jacqueline Freney | 8 | 0 | 3 | 11 |
| Neil Fuller | 6 | 6 | 3 | 15 |
| Ellie Cole | 6 | 5 | 6 | 17 |
| Heath Francis | 6 | 4 | 3 | 13 |
| Tracey Freeman | 6 | 4 | 0 | 10 |
| Russell Short | 6 | 2 | 3 | 11 |
| Darren Thrupp | 6 | 0 | 3 | 9 |
| Siobhan Paton | 6 | 0 | 0 | 6 |
| Kingsley Bugarin | 5 | 8 | 6 | 19 |
| Totals (14 entries) | 105 | 46 | 35 | 186 |

Leading Australian Winter Paralympic medallists 1976–2014

| Athlete | Gold | Silver | Bronze | Total |
|---|---|---|---|---|
| Michael Milton | 6 | 3 | 2 | 11 |
| Bart Bunting/Nathan Chivers (Guide) | 2 | 1 | 0 | 3 |
| Michael Norton | 2 | 0 | 1 | 3 |
| James Patterson | 1 | 1 | 2 | 4 |
| Ben Tudhope | 0 | 1 | 2 | 3 |
| Marty Mayberry | 0 | 1 | 0 | 1 |
| Cameron Rahles-Rahbula | 0 | 0 | 2 | 2 |
| David Munk | 0 | 0 | 2 | 2 |
| Jessica Gallagher | 0 | 0 | 2 | 2 |
| Toby Kane | 0 | 0 | 2 | 2 |
| Totals (10 entries) | 11 | 7 | 15 | 33 |

=== First Gold medallists ===
- Ross Sutton won Australia's first gold medal at the Summer Paralympics in winning the Men's St Nicholas Round open archery at the 1960 Summer Paralympics.
- Daphne Ceeney was Australia's first female gold medallist at the Summer Paralympics. She won two gold medals in swimming events at the 1960 Summer Paralympics.
- Michael Milton became Australia's first Winter Paralympics gold medallist in winning at the Men's Slalom LW2 at the 1992 Winter Paralympics.

=== Dual Summer / Winter Paralympic medallists ===
- Jessica Gallagher - Winter 2010 and 2014 – bronze medals in alpine skiing; Summer 2016 – 1 bronze in cycling.
- Simon Patmore - Summer 2012 - bronze medal in athletics; Winter 2018 - 1 gold, 1 bronze medal snowboarding.

=== Dual Summer / Winter Paralympians ===
As of the 2026 Winter Paralympics, the following Australian athletes have attended both Summer and Winter Games.

- Kyrra Grunnsund – Winter 1980–1992 (skiing); Summer 1992 (athletics)
- Anthony Bonaccurso – Winter 1998 (skiing); Summer 2004 (tennis)
- Michael Milton – Winter 1988–2006, 2026 (skiing); Summer 2008 (cycling)
- Dominic Monypenny - Summer 2008 (rowing); Winter 2010 (cross-country skiing)
- Jessica Gallagher – Winter 2010–2014 (skiing); Summer 2012 (athletics); Summer 2016 (cycling)
- Simon Patmore - Summer 2012 (athletics); Winter 2018 (snowboard)
- Rae Anderson - Summer 2016 (athletics); Winter 2022 (alpine skiing)
- Amanda Reid - Summer 2016, 2020, 2024 (cycling); Winter 2026 (snowboarding)
- Lauren Parker - Summer 2020, 2024 (triathlon, cycling); Winter 2026 (biathlon, cross-country skiing)

=== Dual Olympian/Paralympian ===
- Melissa Tapper-Summer Olympics: 2016-2024. (Table Tennis); Summer Paralympics: 2016-2020. (Table Tennis) One Silver, Two Bronze.

=== Multi-sports Australian Paralympians ===
- List of multi-sport Australian Paralympians - includes those athletes that have competed in one or more sports at the Summer and Winter Paralympic Games

== See also ==
- Australia at the Summer Paralympics
- Australia at the Winter Paralympics
- Australia at the Olympics
- Australia at the 2016 Summer Paralympics
