= Australia at the 2002 Winter Paralympics =

- IPC code: AUS
- NPC: Australian Paralympic Committee
- Website: www.paralympic.org.au

in Salt Lake City
- Competitors: 6 in 1 sport
- Flag bearer: Michael Milton (Opening) Bart Bunting (Closing)
- Officials: 9
- Medals Ranked 8th: Gold 6 Silver 1 Bronze 0 Total 7

Winter Paralympics appearances (overview)
- 1976; 1980; 1984; 1988; 1992; 1994; 1998; 2002; 2006; 2010; 2014; 2018; 2022; 2026

Australia competed at the 2002 Winter Paralympics in Salt Lake City, Utah, United States from 8 March to 19 March 2002. The Salt Lake Paralympics are the eighth such winter games, the first Winter Paralympics ever in North America and the first Winter Paralympics ever set up by an Olympic organizing committee. Although many of the Paralympic expenses were covered by dual planning with the Olympics, organizers still spent about $60 million on the Paralympics, including $5 million on the opening and closing ceremonies. The Salt Lake Games featured 92 events across four sports: alpine skiing, biathlon, cross-country, and ice sledge hockey. The 36 competing countries sent a total of 416 participants (329 men and 87 women). Australia was represented by six male alpine skiers: Peter Boonaerts, Bart Bunting, Michael Milton, Scott Adams, Cameron Rahles-Rahbula, and Mark Drinnan. The medal haul was seven, consisting of six gold and one silver. Australia finished 8th overall in the gold and total medal count, making it the country's most successful Winter Games in terms of gold medals.

Notable Australian performances were:

- Michael Milton had a clean sweep, winning gold in the downhill, super-G, giant slalom and slalom.
- Bart Bunting, a vision-impaired skier guided by Nathan Chivers, won gold in the downhill and super-G, and silver in the giant slalom.

== Background ==
Australia has competed in every Winter Paralympics since its inception in 1976, but the 2002 Salt Lake City Paralympics are considered to be the Games that amassed a huge number of new fans and increased overall crowd attendance for Paralympic winter sports. Salt Lake 2002 was also the first organizing committee to completely integrate the planning for both the Olympics and Paralympics, lowering costs and using the same infrastructure for both Games. "The Salt Lake City 2002 Paralympic Winter Games were truly an event to remember," said International Paralympic Committee (IPC) CEO Xavier Gonzalez, previously Managing Director of Paralympics for the Salt Lake Organizing Committee.

"With such a high demand for tickets and a swarm of accredited media around the venues, the winter spectacle pushed the Paralympic Movement to new heights and created further awareness for athletes with a disability in sport, as well as in society. It was also fantastic to see the Salt Lake Organizing Committee fully integrate the organization of the Paralympics with the Olympics."

Salt Lake City 2002 Paralympics Summary
Host city	Salt Lake City, Utah
Motto	Mind, Body, Spirit
Nations participating	36
Athletes participating	416
Australian athletes	6
Events	4
Opening ceremony	March 7
Closing ceremony	March 16
Officially opened by	President George W. Bush
Paralympic stadium	Rice-Eccles Stadium

=== Attendance and coverage ===
A high ticket demand resulted in the total number being raised from 225,000 to 248,000.

A total of 836 media representatives from more than 30 broadcasters were accredited for the Salt Lake Paralympics, with several international broadcasting associations offering viewers highlight packages following the Games. However, there has been criticism of the drastically different amounts of coverage on the 2002 Salt Lake City Olympics and Paralympics. One particular study from Brigham Young University found that the 2,399 athletes competing in the 2002 Olympic Games were covered by 9,000 accredited media personnel, giving a ratio of 3.75 media persons for each able-bodied athlete. The Paralympic Games, on the other hand, were covered by only 700 accredited media personnel, a ratio of merely 1.66 media persons to each disabled athlete.

Comparison of Olympic and Paralympic Articles Published By Well-known American Newspapers (02/01/02 to 03/18/02)
Newspaper	Olympic Articles	Paralympic Articles
USA Today	611	5
The New York Times	387	5
The Los Angeles Times	533	0
The Washington Post	306	2
The New York Daily News	278	0
The Houston Chronicle	446	1

The study also analysed the themes and underlying representations surrounding the dissimilarity in coverage of the Paralympics by interviewing selected media personnel who only attended the Olympics. The interviews revealed that the lack of coverage of the Paralympics was influenced by the media's feeling that they did not constitute a real competition, logistical issues, and a perception that the event lacked audience appeal. Interviews conducted with selected Paralympic media personnel, however, found that their coverage of the event was influenced by their belief that the Paralympics held audience appeal, their desire to raise disability awareness, their acquaintance with effective National Paralympic Committee public relations campaigns, and previous involvement with the Paralympics.

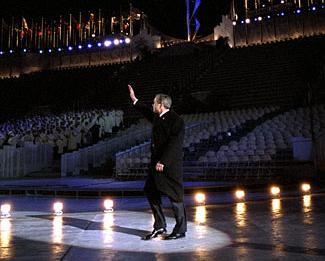
President George W. Bush waves to the crowd as he walks across the ice during the opening ceremony for the 2002 Winter Paralympic Games

=== Opening and closing ceremonies ===
On March 7, 2002, the Salt Lake 2002 Paralympic Winter Games officially began with the opening ceremony at Rice-Eccles Olympic Stadium to a sold-out audience of 46,000. The opening ceremony was based on the theme, "Awaken the Mind – Free the Body – Inspire the Spirit" and featured a cast of nearly 1,000 members, including 'snow spirits' and 'children of light'. Among the performers were Wynonna, Donny Osmond, pop-classical violinist Vanessa-Mae, country singer Billy Gilman and Stevie Wonder. The Paralympic torch was carried to the podium by the first blind man to climb Mount Everest, Erik Weihenmayer. Eric was guided by his dog as he ascended the podium, passing the torch on to two of America's best sit-skiiters – Chris Waddell and Muffy Davis, who together lit the Paralympic cauldron. At the commencement of the Games, President George W. Bush saluted the Paralympians: "Every athlete at these games will demonstrate that we are limited only by the size of our own dreams, and that desire and courage can overcome any obstacle life may bring you," he said.

Nine days later, on March 16, the Olympic Medals Plaza in downtown Salt Lake City staged the Salt Lake 2002 Paralympic closing ceremony, a tribute highlighted by Paralympic skier Lacey Heward joining superstar Patti LaBelle for a rendition of "Lady Marmalade." More than 20,000 fans gathered to say goodbye and honour the thousands of volunteers who made the Salt Lake Paralympics a reality.

=== Torch relay ===
From March 1 to 7, Salt Lake 2002 staged a 'Journey of Fire' to share the spirit of the Paralympic Winter Games with the community. The torch was carried by 100 runners across 15 cities in Utah, and in each city ceremonies were held at Paralympic cauldrons — with Brazilian singers, volunteer firefighters and the Mormon Tabernacle Choir joining the tributes — before the 15 flames were brought together to create a single Paralympic flame in a special celebration on March 6. The following day, runners from age 7 to 96 participated in the Flame Run before it arrived at Rice-Eccles Olympic Stadium for the opening ceremony.

"At the most pure level, the Olympics and the Paralympics are about the same thing," said U.S. alpine skier Chris Waddell. "We as Paralympians experience the same kind of sacrifice, the same kind of commitment to our sport and the same kind of hope that the Olympics is all about. It's just about trying to do something great."

=== Symbol and mascot ===
The logo of the Salt Lake 2002 Paralympic Winter Games is made up of three distinct marks; the sphere on the top represents the head of the Paralympic athlete and also symbolizes the global unity of the Paralympic Movement. Two broad fluid lines represent the athlete in motion. The three taegeuks beneath the athlete reproduce the green, red and blue marks on the Paralympic Flag.

The mascot for the Paralympic Winter Games in Salt Lake City 2002 was Otto the otter. Nearly wiped out by over-trapping and environmental damage, Utah's river otters were successfully reintroduced to the Green River and other areas following the Salt Lake Paralympics. Considered by ancient Indian tribes to be one of the most powerful of all animals, the otter was chosen as the mascot of the Salt Lake Paralympics as an embodiment of vitality and agility, and a representation of each Paralympian's spirit.

=== Disability groups ===
Disabled athletes competing at both the summer and winter Paralympics games are classified as coming from one of six disability groups:

- Cerebral Palsy: Athletes who have brain damage – from a stroke, head accident or similar condition – that results in a number of impaired physiological functions, including difficulties with co-ordination and balance, muscle control, and motor skills.
- Amputee: Athletes who have partially or completely lost at least one limb.
- Vision-Impaired: Athletes who have vision-related impairments ranging from some sight (partial vision) to complete blindness (legally blind).
- Intellectual Disability: Athletes who are limited in intellectual, social, and behavioral functioning. This category of athletes was banned from the 2002 Salt Lake Winter Games after the incident that took place at the 2000 Summer Games in Sydney, in which the majority of the Spanish intellectual disability basketball team were found to not be disabled in any way. The International Paralympic Committee (IPC) has since pushed for stricter criteria in the classification of intellectually disabled athletes.
- Wheelchair: Athletes who have varying spinal impairments and spinal cord injuries. To classify in this category, an athlete's lower limbs must have a loss of function of at least 10 per cent.
- Les Autres: This category is French for "the others" and includes all other athletes who do not clearly fit into one of the above categories. Athletes in this category can have a range of physiological impairments including loss of particular physical functions or specific mobility problems that stem from disabilities like multiple sclerosis and dwarfism, or congenital deformities.

== Team ==
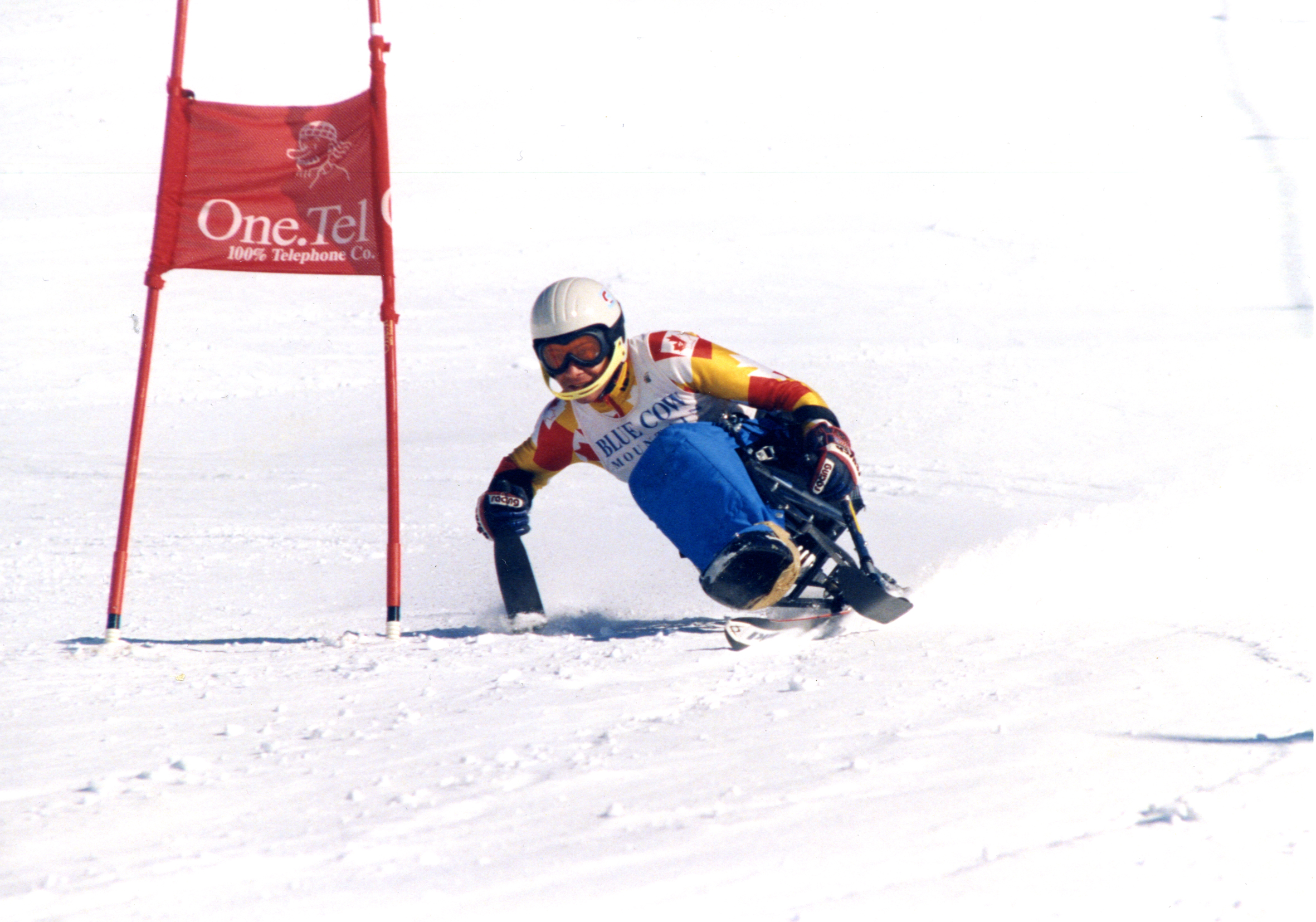
Australian Paralympian Peter Boonaerts during competition at the 2001 Alpine Skiing World Cup

=== Peter Boonaerts ===
Peter Boonaerts (born 21 September 1968 in New Zealand) was a sales representative who grew up in Manly, Sydney. Boonaerts has a low degree of paraplegia; he broke his back at a hotel in Manly when a drunk guest fell from the pub balcony on top of him. His sporting journey begun after he was inspired by a magazine article on disabled skiing, leading him to contact the NSW Sports Council for the Disabled to ask how he could get involved. He first represented Australia in 1999, but his first medal was a bronze in slalom at the Switzerland 2000 World Championships, and at these championships he also finished 4th in the super-G and 6th in the downhill. Although Boonaerts classifies as a wheelchair athlete, he is known as a 'sit skier' during competition.

=== Bartholomew (Bart) Bunting ===
Bart Bunting (born 17 July 1976 in Australia) was a computer programmer who grew up in Chippendale, Sydney. He was born with congenital blindness, meaning that he has not even the slightest degree of vision. His skiing career began in 1998 when he participated in a "tryout camp" for disabled people. Although initially struggling on the mountains, Bunting became an Australian national team member in 1999, and in 2000 he won his first gold medal in the giant slalom and downhill events at the Switzerland 2000 World Championships. Athletes in Bunting's disability class use only sound to navigate their course. Bunting's best friend and guide Nathan Chivers skis a couple of meters ahead of him, speaking to him through the microphone in his helmet and the loudspeaker on the back of his bum bag. Bunting must move according to Nathan's instructions, making the communication and trust between them vitally important. Because of his achievements at the Salt Lake Games, he earned the honor of carrying the Australian flag during the closing ceremony.

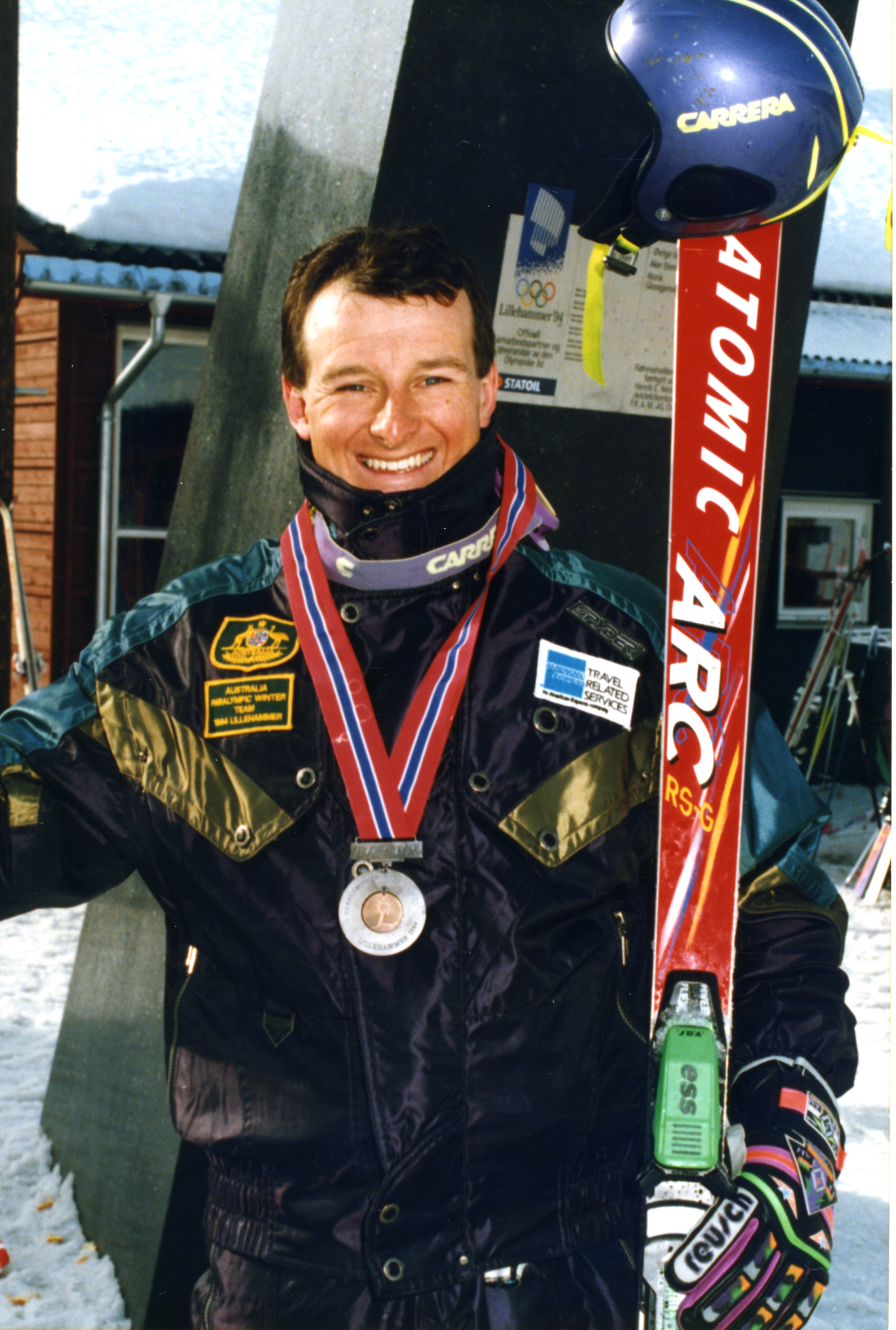
Australian Paralympian Michael Milton at the 1994 Winter Games in Lillehammer

=== Michael Milton ===
Michael Milton (born 21 March 1973 in Canberra) lived in Jindabyne in New South Wales. An early fight with bone cancer led to his left leg being amputated above the knee when he was nine years old. Milton grew up into a skiing family, and becoming an amputee only drove him more to excel in the sport. "I think there's a natural competitive spirit within myself, and perhaps the environment that I grew up in – learning to live with one leg, wanting to be competitive with my able-bodied peers – really created that mindset…. it's only a leg. The really important things in life are family, friends and having fun. None of those things have anything to do with how many legs you have," he said.

Milton first represented Australia in 1988 but retired after the Austria 1996 World Championships for personal reasons. He decided to make a comeback in 1999 after being given a scholarship from the Australian Institute of Sport (AIS), the first of its kind to be awarded to a Paralympian. From there, Milton went on to compete in numerous World Championship and Paralympic Games, winning a whole host of silver and gold medals. He was the Australian flag bearer during the opening ceremony of the Salt Lake Games, and went on to win gold in all four of his events. When he is not competing, Milton works as Disabled Winter Sport Australia (DWA) National Development Coach, and is assisting in the development of Australia's future alpine skiers.

=== Scott Adams ===
Scott Adams (born 17 March 1971 in Australia) was a landscape gardener who grew up in Toongabbie, Sydney. He lost the lower half of his right leg in a freak accident in London, when he was hit by a bus while walking on the footpath. He became involved in skiing through Disabled WinterSports Australia, but his skiing career took off after he won three medals, one gold and two silvers, on debut at the 1999 Canadian Nationals. His LW4 classification means he skis with a prosthesis. Sport is a large part of Adams's life, and despite his disability he often partakes in golf, tennis, squash and mountain biking.

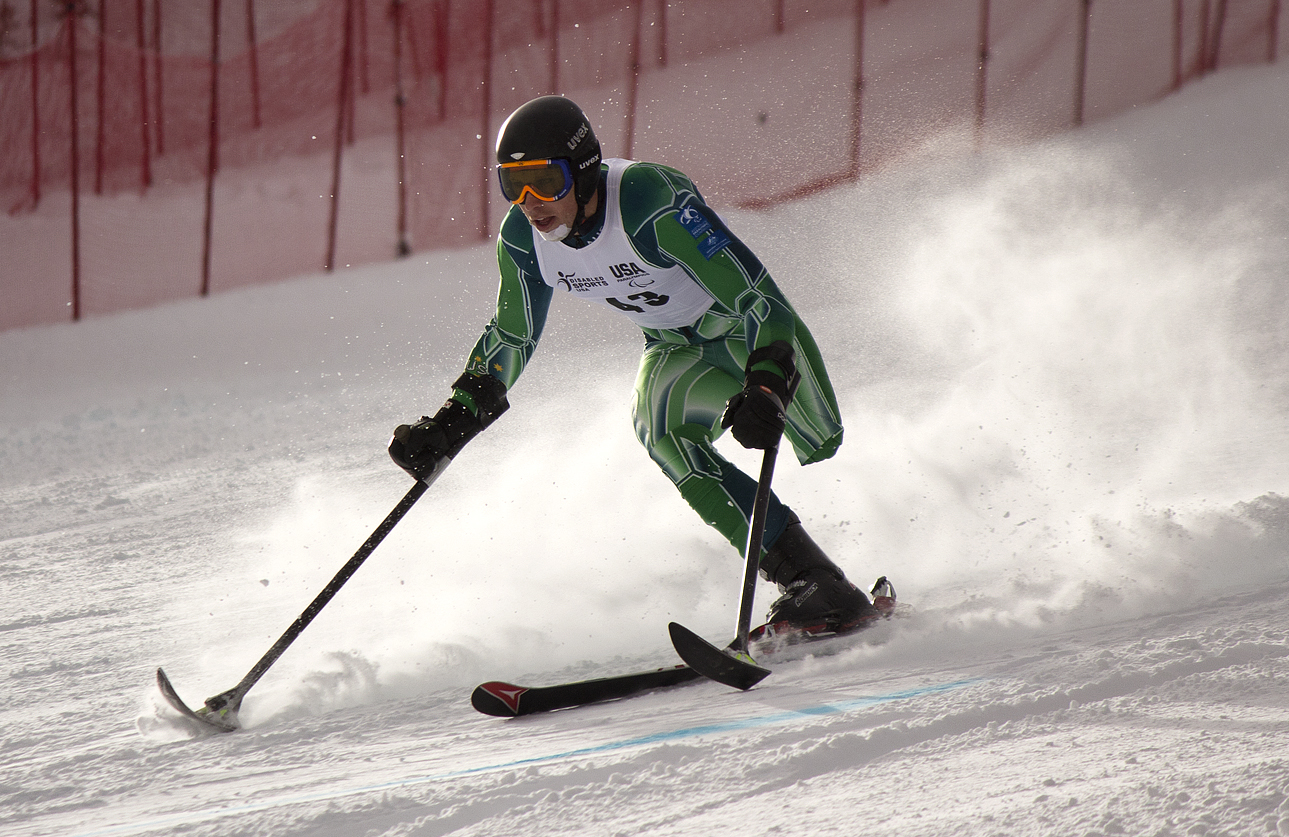
Australian Paralympian Cameron Rahles Rahbula competing in the super-G at the 2012 IPC Nor-Am Cup

=== Cameron Rahles-Rahbula ===
Cameron Rahles-Rahbula (born 9 July 1983 in Camperdown, Victoria), a former physiotherapist, was diagnosed with a rare type of bone cancer called osteosarcoma at twelve years old and had to get his left leg amputated above the knee after ineffective chemotherapy when he was fourteen. Two weeks after his amputation, his children's cancer support network placed him in a ski camp at Mount Buller as part of his rehabilitation program. He could ski unaided after only three days, and from there his skiing career blossomed. His first serious competitive competition and first major success was the 2001 National Championships at Mount Hotham, where he placed second in the giant slalom. It wasn't long before Rahles-Rahbula was noticed by national alpine coach, Steve Bova, and development coach Craig Robinson, who introduced him into the national team and began training with him for the 2002 Salt Lake Paralympics.

=== Mark Drinnan ===
Mark Drinnan (born 10 January 1967 in Bankstown, Sydney), a former locksmith, was born with only partial use of his right leg. He was then involved in a car accident at the age of twenty-two and had to have his left leg amputated below the knee. He learned how to ski through camps held by the NSW Sports Council for the Disabled, and in 2000, he competed at the Canadian Nationals and placed in the top five for all of his events. He competed at the Australian Nationals and Thredbo Cup the following year, where he came first in the slalom at both competitions. The Salt Lake City Paralympics were his first year on the Australian National Team.

== Medalists ==
Despite its small team, Australia performed well at the 2002 Salt Lake City Winter Paralympics. Michael Milton won gold in all four of his events – Downhill, slalom, giant slalom, and super-G, and Bart Bunting with guide Nathan Chivers won gold in two events – downhill and super-G, and silver in the giant slalom.

Medalists
Medal	Name	Sport	Event
Gold	Michael Milton	Alpine Skiing	Men's Downhill LW2
Gold	Michael Milton	Alpine Skiing	Men's Giant Slalom LW2
Gold	Michael Milton	Alpine Skiing	Men's Slalom LW2
Gold	Michael Milton	Alpine Skiing	Men's Super-G LW2
Gold	Bart Bunting / Nathan Chivers	Alpine Skiing	Men's Downhill B1-3
Gold	Bart Bunting / Nathan Chivers	Alpine Skiing	Men's Super-G B1-3
Silver	Bart Bunting / Nathan Chivers	Alpine Skiing	Men's Giant Slalom B1-2

== Classification ==
Athletes competing in the Winter Paralympics are put into one of three categories of classification, depending on their impairment and their level of functionality. Athletes who are physically disabled are given special equipment designed to suit their individuals needs, including orthopedic appliances, and single and sit skits. Athletes who have a vision impairment are assisted through their event by sighted guides, who direct them through obstacles using a microphone and loudspeaker system. In order to let athletes with different disabilities compete against one another, a time adjustment system is used to account for the different aids. The three categories of classification are as follows:

1. Standing (applies to athletes in the cerebral palsy, amputee, and les autres disability groups): LW 1 – 9
- LW 1: Disability above the knees in both legs (two skis, two poles)
- LW 2: Disability above the knee in one leg (one ski, two poles)
- LW 3: Disability below the knees in both legs (two skis, two poles)
- LW 4: Disability below the knee in one leg (two skis, two poles)
- LW 5/7: Disability in both arms or hands (two skis, no poles)
- LW 6/8: Disability in one arm or hand (two skis, none pole)
- LW 9: Combination of disability in arms and legs (two skis, two poles)

2. Sit-Skiers (applies to athletes in the amputee (leg) and wheelchair disability groups): LW 10 – 12

- LW 10: Disability in lower limbs and cannot sit upright without support
- LW 11: Disability in lower limbs and fair amount of sitting balance
- LW 12: Disability – though not major – to lower limbs but can sit upright and balance

3. Vision-Impaired (applies to athletes in the vision-impaired disability groups): B 1 – 3

- B 1: Athletes who are completely blind, or who have limited light perception
- B 2: Athletes who are partially blind, or who can recognize the shape of objects
- B 3: Athletes who have more than five degrees of vision (but less than 20 degrees)

== Events ==
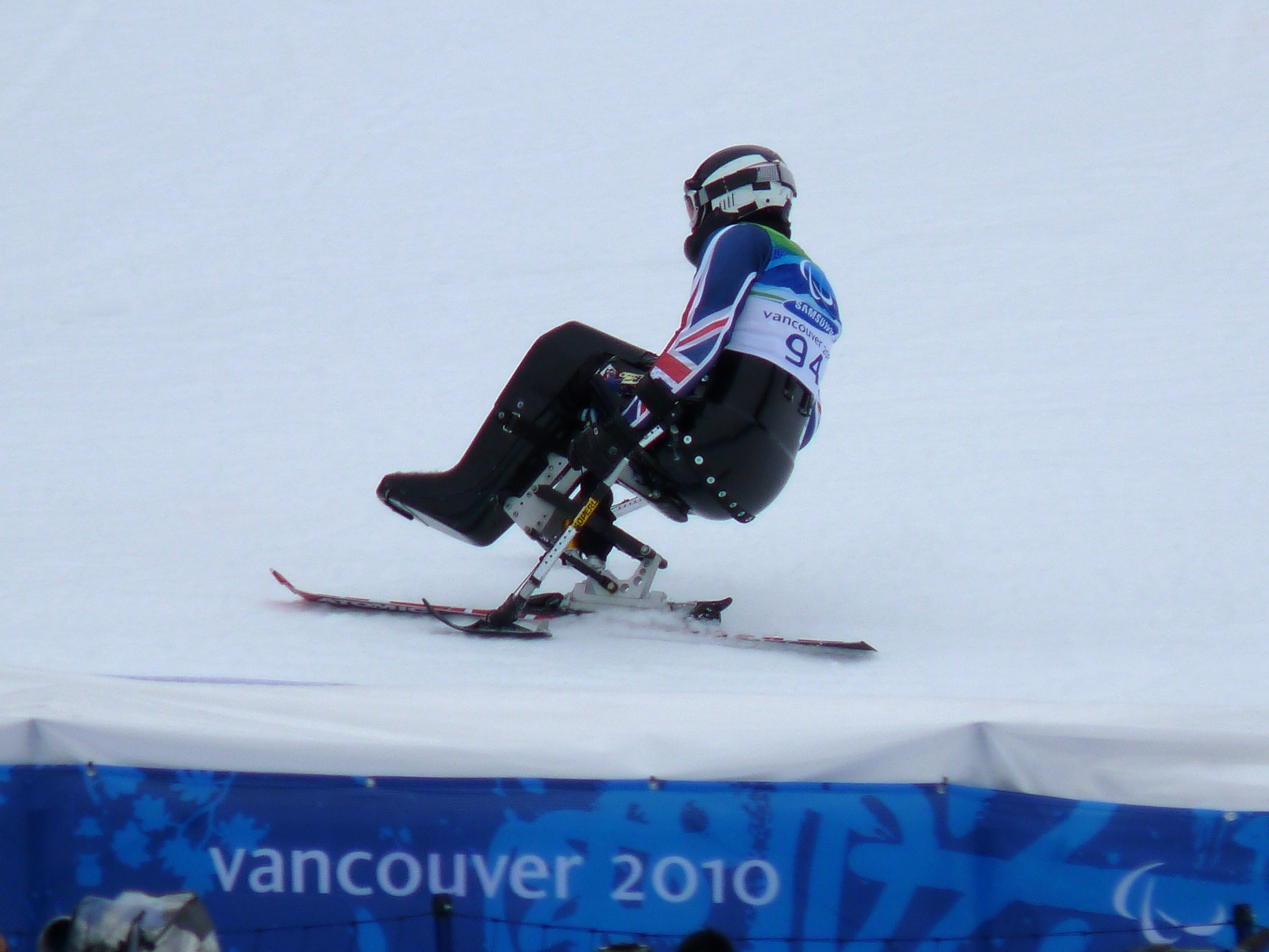
A Paralympic alpine sit-skier navigates his way down the mountains

=== Alpine skiing ===
Athletes in alpine skiing events must combine speed and agility while racing down the slopes at speeds of approximately 100 km/h. As in the Olympics, there are four alpine skiing events: downhill, super-G, slalom, and giant slalom. Downhill events are the only event that is all about speed; athletes complete one downhill 'run' in the fastest time possible, reaching speeds of up t 130 km/h in elite competition. Super giant slalom, or super-G, is also a speed event, but unlike in downhill, racers are required to turn slightly to pass through wide sets of gates on their way down the mountain. In both the downhill and super-G, athletes have only one attempt to achieve the best time.

In slalom events, athletes must ski between gates which are placed closely together, making agility and technique more important than speed. The giant slalom requires athletes to ski between gates that are spaced greater distances apart than in slalom, but less than in super-G. In both the slalom and giant slalom athletes are given two runs, the first of which form the base for the starting order in run two.

=== Results ===
The following shows the times, times after factoring, factor calculation and overall place of the Australian team for each of their events.

Results
Athlete	Event	Time	Factor %	Calculated Factor	Rank
Scott Adams	Men's Downhill LW4	1:36.62	99.74494	1:36.37	12
Scott Adams	Men's Giant Slalom LW4	DNF			
Scott Adams	Men's Slalom LW4	1:57.79	98.66435	1:56.21	9
Scott Adams	Men's Super-G LW4	DNF			
Peter Boonaerts	Men's Downhill LW12	1:54.52	83.89583	1:36.08	14
Peter Boonaerts	Men's Giant Slalom LW12	3:18.76	83.05938	2:45.09	9
Peter Boonaerts	Men's Slalom LW12	2:19.26	75.40576	1:45.01	10
Peter Boonaerts	Men's Super-G LW12	DNF			
Bart Bunting/ Nathan Chivers (Guide)	Men's Slalom B1-2	DSQ			
Bart Bunting/ Nathan Chivers (Guide)	Men's Downhill B1-3	2:23.03	55.87923	1:19.92	1st place, gold medalist(s)
Bart Bunting/ Nathan Chivers (Guide)	Men's Super-G B1-3	2:00.92	57.50793	1:09.54	1st place, gold medalist(s)
Bart Bunting/ Nathan Chivers (Guide)	Men's Giant Slalom B1-2	3:53.60	57.61732	2:14.60	2nd place, silver medalist(s)
Mark Drinnan	Men's Downhill LW3,5/7,9	1:41.60	93.82805	1:35.33	8
Mark Drinnan	Men's Giant Slalom LW3,5/7,9	2:43.18	93.13679	2:31.98	6
Mark Drinnan	Men's Slalom LW3,5/7,9	1:55.14	88.94977	1:42.42	6
Mark Drinnan	Men's Super-G LW3,5/7,9	1:32.81	91.27271	1:24.71	6
Michael Milton	Men's Downhill LW2	1:28.37	94.64836	1:23.64	1st place, gold medalist(s)
Michael Milton	Men's Giant Slalom LW2	2:27.59	92.23105	2:16.12	1st place, gold medalist(s)
Michael Milton	Men's Slalom LW2	1:29.03	100	1:29.03	1st place, gold medalist(s)
Michael Milton	Men's Super-G LW2	1:19.67	92.12996	1:13.40	1st place, gold medalist(s)
Cameron Rahles-Rahbula	Men's Downhill LW2	1:33.80	94.64836	1:28.78	9
Cameron Rahles-Rahbula	Men's Giant Slalom LW2	DNF			
Cameron Rahles-Rahbula	Men's Slalom LW2	1:50.40	100	1:50.40	17
Cameron Rahles-Rahbula	Men's Super-G LW2	DNF			

=== Biathlon ===
The biathlon is a combination of skiing and shooting. It is composed of one 7.5 km track divided into three 2.5 km stages, and between each stage athletes are required to hit two targets set ten meters apart, with time penalties applying for missed targets. The overall position of each athlete is determined using a time formula percentage system that adjusts athletes times relative to their impairment class and those of other racers. Because the percentage system is complex and takes into account the different techniques and impairments of the athletes, it is evaluated every year and adjusted if necessary.

In order to succeed in the biathlon competition, athletes must hone their skills in both physical endurance and shooting accuracy. Visually impaired athletes are aided by audio signals that change in intensity when the athlete is on target.

=== Cross country ===
Cross country is an event in which athletes ski across a snow-covered terrain, rather than down a mountain slope. Athletes compete in one of three events: freestyle (5 km and 2.5 km), classic (5 km, 15 km, and 20 km), and relay (3 x 2.5 km, and 1 x 7.5 km + 2 x 5 km) using their respective aids. Two basic techniques are used in the cross country event: classic-style, where athletes move as if they were skating normally with their skis moving parallel to each other, and free-style, also known as skate skiing, where athletes launch themselves forward as if they were speed-skating. Vision-impaired athletes are aided by their guides and sit-skiers ride on sleds, pulling themselves forward with poles.

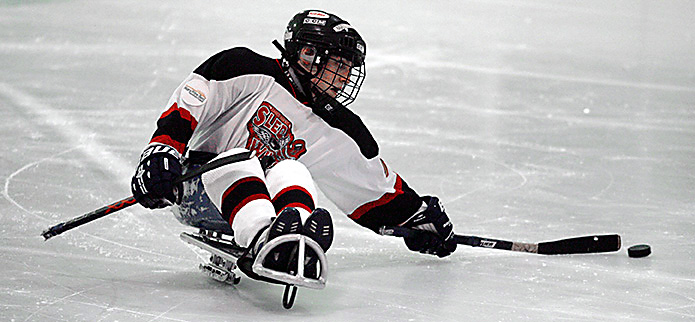
An ice sledge hockey player reaches for the puck

=== Ice sledge hockey ===
Ice sledge hockey is the Paralympic version of ice hockey. It debuted at the 1994 Winter Paralympics in Lillehammer, and has fast become one of the most popular attractions at the Winter Paralympics. A fast-paced and contact heavy competition, Ice Sledge Hockey is played by athletes with a disability in the lower half of their body. It follows the rules of the International Ice Hockey Federation (IIHF) with modifications; athletes wear double-blade 'sledges' instead of skates, which are designed so that the puck can pass beneath them. They hold one stick in each hand, one with a spike-end for pushing, and the other with a blade-end for shooting.

== Administration ==
Team officials were:

- Chef de Mission: Nick Dean
- Assistant Chef de Mission: Jenni Banks
- Manager: Andrew Stainlay
- Coaches: Steve Bova (Head Coach), Silvia Prieler (Technical Coach)
- Ski Technician: Kevin Poole
- Medical: Kevin Boundy (Doctor), Ben Sui (Physiotherapist)
- Media Liaison Officer: Margie McDonald

== Sponsors ==
The 2002 Australian Winter Paralympic team had an extensive list of sponsors, including the Australian Sports Commission, Energy Australia, Fforesite, the Motor Accident Authority, Telstra, Workcover NSW, Workcover Safety Victoria, TAB, Clubs NSW, Yakka, and Rogen.

== See also ==
- Australia at the Winter Paralympics
- Australia at the 2002 Winter Olympics
