= Bart Bunting =

Australian para-alpine skier

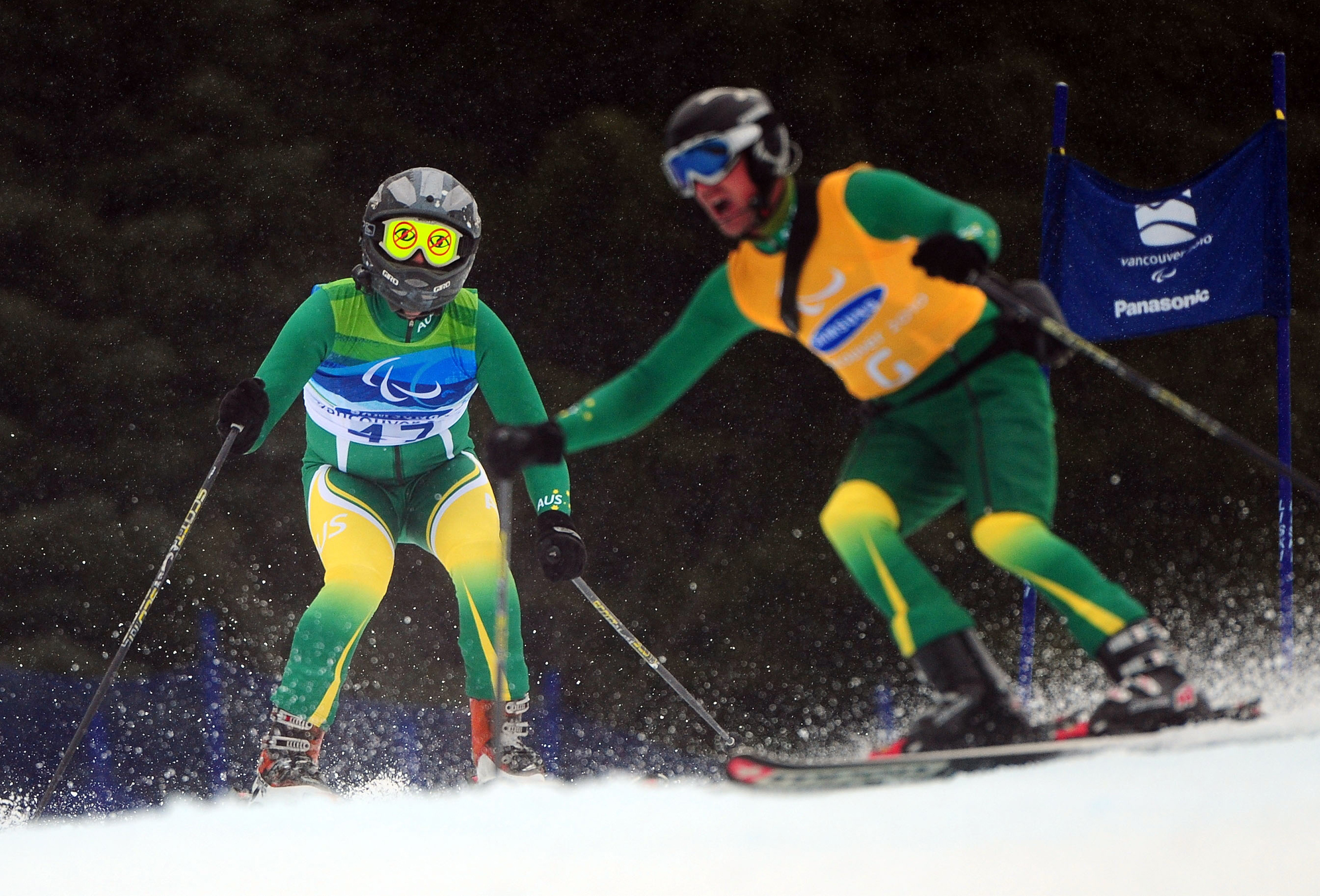
- Bart Bunting (left) at the 2010 Vancouver Winter Paralympics

Personal information
- Nationality: Australian
- Born: 19 July 1976 (age 50)

Sport
- Country: Australia
- Sport: Para-alpine skiing
- Events: Downhill; Super-G; Giant slalom Slalom; Super combined

Achievements and titles
- Paralympic finals: 2002 Winter Paralympics, 2010 Winter Paralympics
Medal record
Men's alpine skiing
Paralympic Games
| Gold medal – first place | 2002 Salt Lake City | Downhill B1–3 |
| Gold medal – first place | 2002 Salt Lake City | Super-G B1–3 |
| Silver medal – second place | 2002 Salt Lake City | Giant slalom B1–2 |
World Championships
| Gold medal – first place | 2000 Anzère | Giant slalom B1–3 |
| Gold medal – first place | 2000 Anzère | Downhill B1–3 |

Bartholomew Bunting (born 19 July 1976) is an Australian blind Paralympic alpine skier. He started skiing in 1998 with his guide Nathan Chivers. He won two gold medals and a silver medal with Chivers at the 2002 Salt Lake City Winter Paralympics and competed at the 2010 Vancouver Paralympics.

== Personal ==
Bunting was born on 19 July 1976, and has been blind since birth. Bunting attended the secondary school Oakhill College. He has a degree in computer science from the University of Technology, Sydney. He was featured on the Australian Broadcasting Corporation's X Paralympic Games in March 2010. In 2022, Bunting was living in the New South Wales north coast town of Nimbin. He works in information technology remotely.

== Skiing ==
Bunting skied with his guide Nathan Chivers, whom he has known since high school. He began skiing in 1998 at a "tryout camp" for people with disabilities. He found it difficult at first, but in 2000, he won a gold medal in the downhill and giant slalom at the IPC Alpine Skiing World Championships in Anzère, Switzerland. From 2001 to 2003 and in 2009, he had an Australian Institute of Sport scholarship for alpine skiing.

Bunting won two gold medals at the 2002 Salt Lake City Games in the downhill B1–3 and super-G B1–3 events, and a silver medal in the giant slalom B1–2 event. Due to these achievements, he carried the Australian flag during the closing ceremony of the Games. Bunting and Chivers retired after 2002 due to Chivers breaking a leg in a motorbike accident. He returned to competition with Chivers in 2009 with the aim of competing at the 2010 Vancouver Games. He competed but did not win any medals at these games with Nathan Chivers as his guide. While he was scheduled to ski in the second run of the giant slalom at the 2010 Games, he withdrew from that competition to focus on the downhill event. He had been in 14th place after his first run. By June 2011, he had retired from elite skiing.
