= Nathan Chivers =

Australian guide skier (born 1976)

Personal information
- Nationality: Australian
- Born: 18 July 1976 (age 49)
Medal record
Men's alpine skiing
Representing Australia
Paralympic Games
Gold medal – first place	2002 Salt Lake City	Downhill B1–3
Gold medal – first place	2002 Salt Lake City	Super-G B1–3
Silver medal – second place	2002 Salt Lake City	Giant slalom B1–2

Nathan Chivers (born 18 July 1976) is an Australian guide skier and skis with Bart Bunting, whom he met in high school. In this role, he won two gold medals at the 2002 Salt Lake City Games in the men's downhill B1–3 and super-G B1–3 events, and a silver medal at the men's giant slalom B1–2 event. He also competed with Bunting at the 2010 Winter Games, where the pair did not win a medal. In 2001, he had an Australian Institute of Sport scholarship for alpine skiing.

Chivers has a wife, Katy, and two children. He works as a manager at his family's nursery.
