= Joshua Safran (author) =

American activist and writer

Joshua Safran (born 1975) is a nationally recognized champion for women's rights whose advocacy was featured in the award-winning documentary Crime After Crime. He is the author of the memoir Free Spirit: Growing Up On the Road and Off the Grid.

== Crime After Crime ==
In 2011, the documentary Crime After Crime debuted at the Sundance Film Festival. It made its television debut on OWN (the Oprah Winfrey Network). The film followed attorney Joshua Safran and his law partner's efforts to free wrongfully imprisoned domestic violence survivor Deborah Peagler. The film was directed by filmmaker Yoav Potash, and was released to critical acclaim.

The film won numerous awards, including the Robert F. Kennedy Journalism Award, The National Board of Review’s Freedom of Expression Award, The Hillman Prize for Broadcast Journalism, and over 20 other top honors for documentaries in the US and abroad. The film was a New York Times Critics' Pick.

== Free Spirit ==
Safran's memoir, Free Spirit: Growing Up On the Road and Off the Grid, was published September 10, 2013 by Hachette Book Group. The memoir was praised by critics. Kirkus Reviews described it as "a remarkable account of survival despite the odds". Publishers Weekly gave it a starred review, stating "This assured debut is reminiscent of David Sedaris’s and Augusten Buroughs’s best work: introspective, hilarious, and heartbreaking". San Francisco Chronicle wrote that it "offers engaging story after story and a healthy dose of narrative tension throughout."

Free Spirit follows Safran's life story from his birth in a San Francisco commune, to traveling the American west with his single mother as she searched for Utopia. As they encountered a cast of colorful characters, they lived in everything from an ice cream truck to a lean-to on a stump. When Safan's mother married an abusive ex-guerrilla fighter from Central America, their life darkened. Eventually Safran learned to fight back and help free his mother and himself from abuse.

On September 10, 2013, the Free Spirit short film was released. Directed by Crime After Crime filmmaker Yoav Potash, the film doubled as a book trailer.

== Advocacy ==
Joshua Safran is a nationally recognized champion for the rights of women and an advocate for survivors of domestic violence and the wrongfully imprisoned. He has received numerous awards for his work including The Pursuit of Justice Award from the California Women's Law Center, The Rollie Mullen Award from Stand for Families Free of Violence, The Domestic Violence Pro Bono Law Award from the Domestic Violence Practicum at UC Berkeley School of Law, the California Coalition for Women Prisoners, and the California Habeas Project, as well as The CORA (Community Overcoming Relationship Abuse) Award.

He is also known for his public service and his commitment to land use law.

== Personal life ==
Safran's mother's family is Jewish, and Safran currently practices Orthodox Judaism, after having reconnected with his Jewish heritage at 9 years old.
