= Among Neighbors =

2025 documentary film about Jews murdered in Poland after WWII ended

- Promotional poster
- Directed by: Yoav Potash
- Written by: Yoav Potash
- Produced by: Yoav Potash
- Cinematography: Błazej Pyrka; Yoav Potash
- Edited by: Lauren Schwartzman; Yoav Potash; Aaron I. Butler, ACE
- Production companies: Headfirst Arts & Media
- Distributed by: 8 Above
- Release dates: November 10, 2024 (World premiere at Warsaw Jewish Film Festival); February 6, 2025 (United States premiere at Santa Barbara International Film Festival); October 10, 2025 (United States theatrical release)
- Running time: 100 minutes
- Country: United States
- Languages: English, Polish

Among Neighbors is a 2024 American documentary film, directed, written, and produced by Yoav Potash.

Ten years in the making, Among Neighbors reveals the "gripping, deeply emotional murder mystery surrounding the killing of Jews in the small town of Gniewoszów, Poland — months after WWII had concluded."

The film centers on Yaacov Goldstein, a Holocaust survivor, and Pelagia Radecka, an eyewitness to the murder of Jews in Gniewoszów, Poland, six months after the end of World War II. Anita Friedman also appears in the film and serves its Executive Producer.

Among Neighbors has received critical acclaim not only for its powerful and, at times, beautiful tale of human suffering, longing and resilience, but also for its use of hand-drawn animation, which brings the past to life with touches of magical realism.

The film’s documentation of Polish complicity in the near-total eradication of Jewish life in Poland, however, has sparked outrage among far-right nationalists in the Polish government. In November 2025, the office of Polish President Karol Nawrocki called for the film to be banned and Poland’s national broadcasting council launched an investigation into the film.

Among Neighbors had its world premiere at the 2024 Warsaw Jewish Film Festival, where it won the Special Award, which included a cash prize funded by Telewizja Polska (also known as TVP), a Polish public television network.

The film received critical acclaim and 16 other accolades, including the Robert F. Kennedy Journalism Award and seven film festival audience awards, earning it the title "the year's most-awarded Jewish film."

Among Neighbors was released theatrically in Israel in April 2025, shortly before a national primetime broadcast on yes docu that was timed to coincide with Yom HaShoah. Immediately following the broadcast, the film began streaming in Israel on the STING+ platform.

The film was released theatrically in the United States on October 10, 2025 by 8 Above. Among Neighbors began streaming in the United States and many other countries Amazon Prime Video and Apple TV on May 12, 2026.

== Plot ==
Among Neighbors opens with a mysterious scene in which a Jewish tombstone is discovered, amid piles of scrap metal and junk, in the backyard of a Polish elder and his middle-aged son. When asked by the filmmaker to return the tombstone to the Jewish cemetery, the son says he "doesn't want to start any trouble." With that, a montage begins that includes news clips regarding Poland's so-called "Holocaust law," an effort to silence accounts of Polish complicity in the Holocaust. We also hear snippets of interviews with Yaacov Goldstein, a Holocaust survivor, and Pelagia Radecka, an eyewitness to when Jews were murdered, six months after the end of World War II.

In its first act, the film features interviews with Yaacov, Pelagia, and others who lived through the World War II period in Gniewoszów, depicting the town as a place where Jews and Poles co-existed, mostly peacefully, for centuries before World War II. Yaacov recalls his large prewar Jewish family and the setting of the little town as a "magic story," and his interview is accompanied by animated scenes touched with magical realism, such as when young Yaacov soars above the village with a smile on his face, flying from one relative to another.

Pelagia, meanwhile, describes how enamored she was by her Jewish neighbors, the Weinbergs, whose fabric shop fascinates her. Music swells as a young animated Pelagia stares into the eyes of the Weinberg's son Janek, who she clearly has a crush on.

The opening of the film also includes the accounts of Anita Friedman, the American-born daughter of a Holocaust survivor from Gniewoszów, and her son, Aaron Friedman Tartakovsky. Together, they describe how their family heritage stretches back for generations in Gniewoszów, but that when they first attempted to visit the town in 2005, they were forced out by menacing antisemites.

The beginning of World War II in 1939 and the arrival of ruthless German soldiers marks the beginning of the film's second act. To evade the Nazis as well as Polish people who Yaacov says "hunted the Jews," Yaacov's parents arrange for him to be hidden by a (non-Jewish) Polish family. Once Yaacov's parents are not there to see how he is treated, however, the Polish family moves Yaacov into a cramped hiding place, keeping him "like an animal in a cage."

Pelagia, meanwhile, goes out of her way to track the whereabouts of the Jewish family she admired before the war, especially young Janek Weinberg. As part of her efforts, she sneaks into the Jewish ghetto in Gniewoszów, where Mrs. Weinberg gives Pelagia a section of special fabric. As Pelagia receives the fabric, the animation in the film shows the polka-dots magically flying up off the fabric, encircling Pelagia, Mrs. Weinberg, and Janek Weinberg.

Pelagia recalls the end of the war in 1945, and in animation, we see her thrill at the sight of Janek Weinberg and his family returning to the ruins of Gniewoszów. But Pelagia's elation is crushed when she witnesses local Polish men murder Janek's parents and three other Jews in cold blood.

Interviews with historians reveal that this mass murder was part of a pattern of antisemitic violence that took place across Poland. Recent news footage shows how Poland's far-right uses the threat of prison sentences to silence discussion of this dark past, but Pelagia defies the government, her voice shaking with outrage as she describes the murders. When the filmmaker asks who is the first person she has given her testimony to, she replies "You. You are the first."

All of these stories motivate the filmmaker to leave no stone unturned in his investigation of the town's past, and when he comes to tell Pelagia — four years after she first came forward as an eyewitness — that he has found Janek, she is overcome with emotion.

== Production ==
=== Filming ===
Filmmaker Yoav Potash began making the film in 2014, when Aaron Friedman Tartakovsky and Aaron's mother Anita Friedman invited Potash to film the rededication of the Jewish cemetery in their ancestral town of Gniewoszów. Potash then spent additional time in Gniewoszów interviewing Polish elders to see what they recalled about the era in which Jews were their neighbors — their bakers, butchers, tailors, and shoemakers, and for the children, their playmates. The first memories shared by these elders fondly depicted Jewish/Polish coexistence, but eventually, these individuals also described or revealed strains of antisemitism –– and they admitted that Poles murdered Jews in their town long after the defeat of Nazi Germany.

A year after filming began, the Jewish Historical Institute in Warsaw put the filmmaker in contact with Pelagia Radecka, a direct eyewitness to the postwar murders. Radecka had begun writing letters to Jewish organizations in an effort to share what she knew. Radecka, age 85 during her first interview, gave searing eyewitness testimony about the murders — and sought Potash’s help in finding Janek Weinberg, the surviving child of two of the victims.

During the fourth year of the film’s production, while researching a Jewish folk artist from Gniewoszów named Harry Lieberman, Potash discovered Lieberman's great nephew, Yaacov Goldstein, a living Holocaust survivor from the town. Goldstein was born and raised in Gniewoszów, and survived the Holocaust as a hidden child. The film documents his suffering and his miraculous survival, and shows how he experienced violent antisemitism perpetrated by the invading Germans and by the local Polish population.

Experts interviewed in the film include journalist Konstanty Gebert, Rabbi Michael Schudrich, photographer Łukasz Baksik, mass graves investigator Aleksander Schwarz, Polish diplomat Piotr Wilczek, and historians Madga Teter and Dariusz Stola.

=== Animation ===
To bring the memories of Pelagia Radecka and Yaacov Goldstein to life, the filmmaker used dreamlike hand-drawn animation that The Hollywood Reporter compared to the Academy Award-nominated 2008 film Waltz with Bashir.

While Potash initially tested his ideas by working with a single animator, the number of animated scenes the director envisioned grew as the film progressed, and eventually about 40 animators in four countries worked for several years on the film's hand-drawn scenes. The film's animation department was divided into two teams, with a team based in Poland animating Pelagia Radecka’s story, and another team in Spain, Mexico, and the United States animating Yaacov Goldstein's story.

== Release ==
=== Film festivals and awards ===
Among Neighbors had its world premiere at the Warsaw Jewish Film Festival on November 10, 2024, where it won the festival's Special Award, which included a cash prize funded by Telewizja Polska (also known as TVP), a Polish public television network.

The film had its US premiere at the Santa Barbara International Film Festival on February 6, 2025, and soon won awards at additional film festivals including San Francisco IndieFest, Berkshire International Film Festival, San Diego International Jewish Film Festival, Austin Jewish Film Festival, New Hampshire Jewish Film Festival, Jewish Nevada International Film Festival, and three awards at the Teaneck International Film Festival.

Among Neighbors also was awarded outside of the film festival circuit, with the Religion Communicators Council giving the film its Wilbur Award for excellence in communicating religious issues, values and themes in secular media, and the Robert and Ethel Kennedy Center for Human Rights awarding it the Robert F. Kennedy Journalism Award, given to media with a focus on human rights, social justice and the power of individual action.

The numerous accolades led the Detroit Jewish News to declare Among Neighbors “the year's most-awarded Jewish film.”

=== Release in Israel ===
In Israel, Among Neighbors received a national primetime broadcast on YES Docu on April 23, 2025, which was timed to coincide with Yom Hashoah, Israel’s day of Holocaust Remembrance. The film also was released theatrically in Israel in April 2025, selling out at multiple Lev Theaters, Cinematheque Tel Aviv, Cinematheque Jerusalem, and multiple other venues. The release was supported by positive press from across Israeli media, including The Jerusalem Post which called the film "a profound mystery" and "a powerful reckoning."

=== Release in the United States ===
The film was theatrically released in the United States on October 10, 2025 by 8 Above, opening at New York City's historic Quad Cinema, before opening the following week at two Laemmle Theatres in Los Angeles. The release, which eventually brought the film to dozens of cities, was supported by positive reviews in US publications, including mainstream press, Hollywood trades, and Jewish press. The San Francisco Chronicle, for example, called the film "a remarkable movie... that subverts the traditional view of a Holocaust documentary." The film began streaming on Amazon Prime Video and Apple TV on May 12, 2026.

== Reception ==
=== Audience Reception ===
On the review aggregator website Rotten Tomatoes, the film has a 100% critic's approval rating (the "Tomatometer").

=== Critical reception ===
Longtime San Francisco Chronicle film journalist G. Allen Johnson called the film "an absorbing true crime movie."

On KQED-FM's in-depth interview program Forum, radio host Lesley McKlurg called Among Neighbors "a beautiful film — heart-wrenching," adding that it is "drawing international attention both for its incredible storytelling and the fierce political reaction it sparked in Poland."

Writing for the The Jewish Journal of Greater Los Angeles, Ayala Or-El called the film "a powerful fusion of animation and testimony, where art and memory intertwine," adding that "Through this masterful blend of visual storytelling and firsthand accounts, 'Among Neighbors' transcends traditional documentary form, becoming part magical realism, part investigative reporting and part historical reckoning. At its heart lies a chilling truth."

The film's intricate editing and creative use of animation was praised in various reviews of the film. In one example, Elizabeth Rosner, writing for Moment Magazine, stated: "The deft interweaving of hand-drawn animation with archival footage and first-hand testimony is one of many features that sets this film apart from other approaches to representing the Holocaust. Such visual and sometimes non-verbal eloquence allows the viewer intimate access to the stories held for so long by these survivors and witnesses."

=== Controversy in Poland ===
On November 10, 2025, Among Neighbors began airing on Telewizja Polska (also known as TVP), the same broadcaster that had given the film its Special Award at the Warsaw Jewish Film Festival a year earlier. The film was praised in the Polish press for its "thorough analysis of Polish-Jewish relations" and how it "paints a complex picture of shared life through the centuries." However, the film was soon met with aggressive attacks launched by right-wing nationalist government officials and constituencies, including from the office of Poland's president, Karol Nawrocki.

As reported by the San Francisco Chronicle in an article under the headline "Polish presidential official demands Bay Area filmmaker's Holocaust doc be banned," the office of Poland's far-right president launched a smear campaign against the film. This campaign largely began after Agnieszka Jędrzak, undersecretary to Polish President Karol Nawrocki, attacked the film on X, calling it "anti-Polish historical manipulation." After Jędrzak's string of outraged posts, Poland's National Broadcasting Council (similar to the Federal Communications Commission in the United States) launched an "investigation" into the film.

The broadcaster, however, stood by the film, releasing a statement that read in part: "Accusations that this thoroughly prepared, moving documentary is anti-Polish can only be made by people who have not seen the film." The network refused to remove the film from its streaming platform or broadcast schedule.

In early April 2026, dozens of the world's experts on the Holocaust, World War II, and Polish history published an open letter in defense of the film, stating that there is "unequivocal evidence that the survivors encountered hostility or were even murdered upon their return."

In interviews about the controversy, filmmaker Potash stated that Among Neighbors is not an anti-Polish film, and that Polish viewers could in fact be proud of Pelagia Radecka "because she showed a lot of courage overcoming overwhelming pressure from the murderers, and later the politicians, who tried to silence her." He also expressed hope that the attacks on the film would backfire, attracting attention to the film and leading more people to see it.

== Awards ==
Among Neighbors has received numerous awards and honors, including seven film festival audience awards and multiple national and international awards.

Film Festival or Organization	Award Category	Result
Ames Amzalak Rochester Jewish Film Festival	Audience Award	Won
Austin Jewish Film Festival	Audience Award	Won
Berkshire International Film Festival	Audience Award for Best Documentary Feature	Won
Jewish Film Festival Network	Best Holocaust Film	Won
Jewish Film Institute	Envision Award	Won
Jewish Nevada International Film Festival	Audience Award for Best Documentary Film	Won
Los Angeles Film Awards	Best Documentary	Won
New Hampshire Jewish Film Festival	Best of Fest Award for Best Documentary	Won
Ojai Film Festival	Best Documentary Feature	Nominated
Ojai Film Festival	Social Impact and Vision Award	Nominated
Religion Communicators Council	Wilbur Award	Won
Robert F. Kennedy Human Rights Center	Robert F. Kennedy Journalism Award	Won
San Diego International Jewish Film Festival	Audience Award for Best Documentary Feature	Won
San Francisco Independent Film Festival (SF IndieFest)	Audience Award for Best Documentary Feature	Won
Teaneck International Film Festival	Audience Award for Best Documentary	Won
Teaneck International Film Festival	Audience Award for Best of the Fest	Won
Teaneck International Film Festival	Jury Award for Best Documentary	Won
Warsaw Jewish Film Festival	Special Award	Won
