= Food Stamped =

- Directed by: Shira Potash; Yoav Potash
- Release date: 2010
- Country: United States
- Language: English

Food Stamped is a 2010 documentary film by Shira Potash and Yoav Potash, about food stamps and a couple who take the food stamp challenge and live on a food stamp budget for one week.

The film features U.S. Representative Barbara Lee, one of four members of Congress who took the food stamp challenge. It premiered in October 2010 at the Mill Valley Film Festival. The film won the Jury Prize at the San Francisco Independent Film Festival and is an official selection of Whole Foods Market's online film festival, Do Something Reel. Food Stamped was also featured on CNN Money.
