= Food stamp challenge =

Internet challenge

Logo of the SNAP program, popularly known as “food stamps”

A food stamp challenge or SNAP challenge is a trend in the United States popularized by politicians, religious groups, community activists and food pantries, in which a family of means chooses to purchase food using only the monetary equivalent of what a family that size would receive in the US federal government Supplemental Nutrition Assistance Program (SNAP), colloquially called food stamps. In 2015, this amounted to US$194.00 per person per month, or $6.37 per day.

== History ==
CNN reporter Sean Callebs did an experiment where he spent the month of February 2009 eating only as much food as what a person could get with the maximum possible amount of food stamps. Since he was living in New Orleans, Louisiana, this amounted to $176. At the end of the experiment, he said that he had eaten pretty well, and that the biggest drawback was a social one, not a nutritional one, because he could not go out to eat at restaurants with friends.

In St. Louis, Missouri, Food Outreach executive director Greg Lukeman has led a food stamp challenge since 2008, during September "Hunger Action Month" to bring awareness of the nonprofit organization's clients. Community members, Food Outreach staff and supporters, area politicians, and members of the local media have participated and blogged about the experience.

In October 2010, a new documentary Food Stamped, where a couple live on a food stamp budget for a week, premiered at the Mill Valley Film Festival.

In May 2013, Sen. Chris Murphy (D-CT) took part in a week-long SNAP Challenge during which he tweeted: "Living this wk on $4.80/day food budget. Got on scale this morning - lost 6 lbs in 4 days."

In June 2013, Donny Ferguson, the communications director for Rep. Steve Stockman (R-TX), attempted to counter the popular opinion that food stamp funds were not enough to survive on. He spent $27.68 without a shopping list or coupons or discounts, and argued that at such rates, the government could afford cuts to the SNAP program as deep as 12%. He further argued that savings could be made by buying vegetables instead of rice and beans, advanced planning, and pooling of resources with a larger family stipend. Ferguson overperformed the challenge by buying enough food for and participating for 10 days instead of seven.

In April 2015, actress Gwyneth Paltrow purchased $29 of food for one week, and posted a picture of the food on her Twitter account.

== Criticism ==
The Food Stamp Challenge ignores the supplemental portion of the SNAP program, which does not intend for SNAP benefits to be the only source of food. 75% of SNAP participants use their own money to purchase some of their food, and the remaining 25% would receive benefits larger than the average employed in the food stamp challenge. Only 20% of SNAP beneficiaries have no income; for those with income, families are expected to contribute 30% of income to their food budget. Therefore, SNAP benefits and the Expected Family Contribution (EFC) always equal the maximum benefit ($668 for a family of four). Food Stamp Challenges challenges therefore result in menus bearing little resemblance to the USDA official food plans calculated on the maximum benefit because they ignore the effect of the Expected Family Contribution.

== See also ==
- Live Below the Line
