= Live Below the Line =

Annual anti-poverty campaign

Live Below the Line is an annual anti-poverty campaign run by the Oaktree Foundation. The campaign began as a challenge in which participants would feed themselves on the equivalent of the extreme poverty line for five days to gain an insight into some of the hardships faced by those who live in extreme poverty, but was later expanded to include other activities to reflect a more diverse understanding of poverty. It also raises money for sustainable development projects across the globe.

The campaign began in Melbourne, Australia, in 2010 and has since spread to the UK, US, New Zealand, Canada, and Colombia.

== History ==
Live Below the Line was started in Australia by Rich Fleming and Nick Allardice from The Global Poverty Project and The Oaktree Foundation. They had been fighting poverty for a number of years and were worried about public awareness of the subject. The aim was to highlight the issue of extreme poverty and promote change for the world's poor.

Live Below the Line was created in June 2010 and its first campaign ran in August that year. Over 2,000 people participated and $520,000 was raised. By 2019 a total of A$11.2m has been raised in the Australian version of the campaign.

The Live Below the Line challenge has been taken by a number of international celebrities, including actors Hugh Jackman, Ben Affleck, Tom Hiddleston, and singer Josh Groban. Within Australia, the challenge has been taken by Federal Opposition Leader Bill Shorten, former Federal Treasurer Wayne Swan, actors Erin Richards and Rachel Brosnahan, Stephen Curry and Rhiannon Fish, Masterchef Australia winners Julie Goodwin and Kate Bracks, musicians Lindsay McDougall and Sarah McLeod, radio hosts Alex Dyson and Veronica Milsom, and 2011 Australian of the Year Simon McKeon.

Live Below the Line is run as a joint venture between The Global Poverty Project and The Oaktree Foundation.

In 2022, The Oaktree Foundation expanded the scope of Live Below the Line to include other forms of poverty beyond malnutrition.

== Structure ==
The initial structure of the campaign involved participants eating on the extreme poverty line, as defined by the World Bank in 2005: US$1.25 a day, adjusted for purchasing power parity and inflation. As of 2023, this amount was $2 per day.

In 2022, the Oaktree Foundation expanded the scope of Live Below the Line beyond eating on the $2 a day model. The new concept reimagined by Oaktree would involve participants choosing one of five 'lines' and developing a challenge for themselves along the theme of that line. The lines are:

- Energy, representing energy poverty and structural barriers to access to electricity. Participants living below the energy line could enforce a daily power outage in their home or restrict their use of electricity in some other way.
- Food, representing malnutrition and lack of access to food. Participants living below the food line could eat below the poverty line or eat plant-based food for five days.
- Shelter, representing a lack of access to safe and affordable housing. Participants living below the shelter line could go without furniture and bedding or go without shelter in some other way.
- Technology, representing barriers to access of technology and the internet. Participants living below the technology line could go without recreational use of the internet or restrict their access to technology in some other way.
- Waste, representing the unequal distribution of waste worldwide. Participants living below the waste line could go zero-waste for five days or go without plastic.

== See also ==
- Food stamp challenge
