= Yoav Potash =

American writer and filmmaker

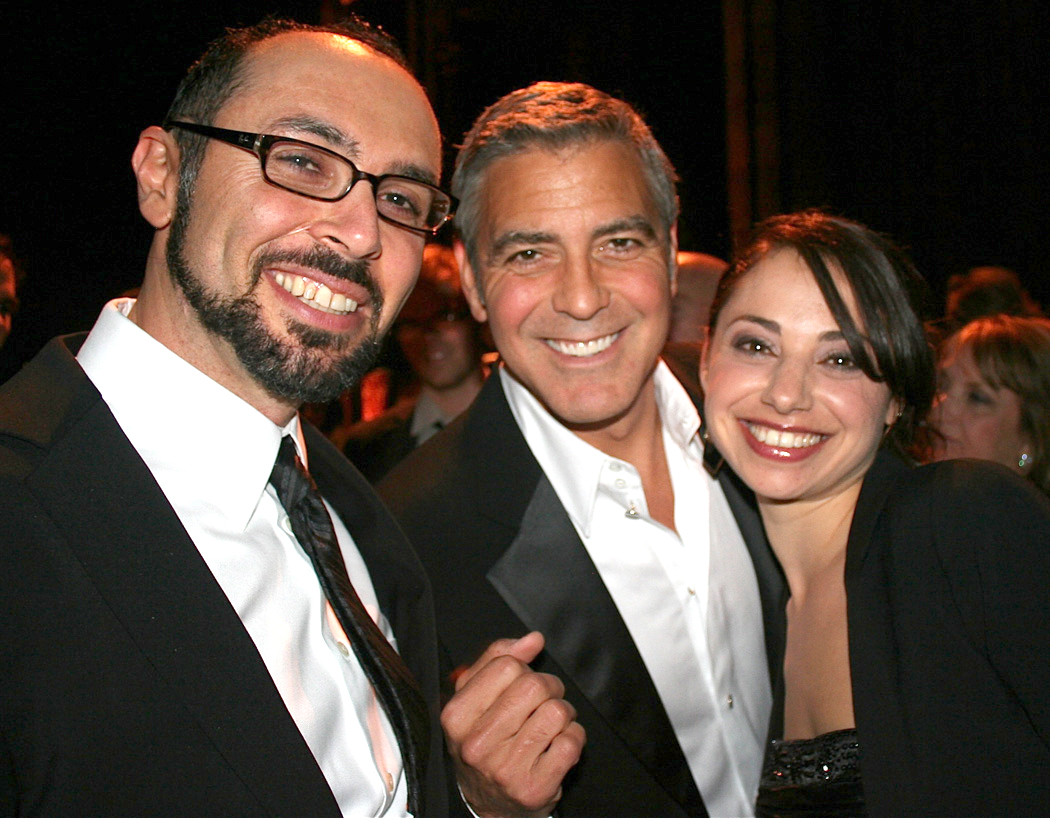
Potash (left) with George Clooney and Potash's wife Shira at the 2012 National Board of Review Awards in New York City.

Yoav Potash is an American writer and filmmaker whose works include the documentaries Among Neighbors, Crime After Crime, and Food Stamped.

== Movies ==
Potash produced and directed the award-winning, partially-animated documentary film Among Neighbors, about a small Polish town where Holocaust survivors were murdered six months after the end of World War II. The film had its world premiere at the 2024 Warsaw Jewish Film Festival, where it won the Special Award, and had its US premiere at the 2025 Santa Barbara International Film Festival. The film won the Robert F. Kennedy Journalism Award and at least 15 other awards and honors, leading it to be dubbed “the year’s most-awarded Jewish film.”

Potash produced and directed the film Crime After Crime, about the legal battle to free Deborah Peagler from a California prison. The film premiered at the 2011 Sundance Film Festival and went on to win dozens of awards in the US and abroad. Potash produced the documentary over a five and a half year span, an experience he wrote about for The Wall Street Journal. The film was broadcast on OWN, the Oprah Winfrey Network, as part of the OWN Documentary Club. Awards the film has received include the Robert F. Kennedy Journalism Award, The National Board of Review’s Freedom of Expression Award, The Hillman Prize for Broadcast Journalism, and over 20 other top honors for documentaries in the US and abroad. The film was a New York Times Critics' Pick.

Potash's film Food Stamped documents the challenges of eating healthy on a food stamp budget. The film won the Jury Prize at the San Francisco Independent Film Festival and was nationally broadcast on Pivot, Participant Media's satellite and cable network. "Food Stamped" was also an official selection of Whole Foods Market’s online film festival, Do Something Reel. and was featured on CNN Money.

In 2012, The Hollywood Reporter reported that Potash is working to adapt Crime After Crime into a dramatic major motion picture. In 2013, Potash's screenplay for that project ranked in the top 1% of over 3,000 dramatic scripts entered in the Austin Film Festival Screenplay Competition. That same year, Potash was selected to participate in the Film Independent Producing Lab to further develop the dramatic adaptation project.

In 2018, Potash was selected as a filmmaker-in-residence at the Jewish Film Institute in San Francisco to produce two documentary films on untold stories of the Holocaust, entitled The Remembered, which was later titled Among Neighbors, and Diary from the Ashes.

== Writing ==
Potash earned a 2018 Simon Rockower Award for Excellence in Jewish Journalism from The American Jewish Press Association for his personal essay entitled "How I learned all Israelis are not my father," published by J, The Jewish News of Northern California. Potash has also written articles about his filmmaking experiences for publications including The Wall Street Journal IndieWire, Videomaker, The Sundance Institute and TheWrap.

== Personal life ==
Potash, Jewish, was raised by a Jewish, Israeli father and an American Jewish mother.
