= Hugh Evans (humanitarian) =

Australian humanitarian (born 1983)

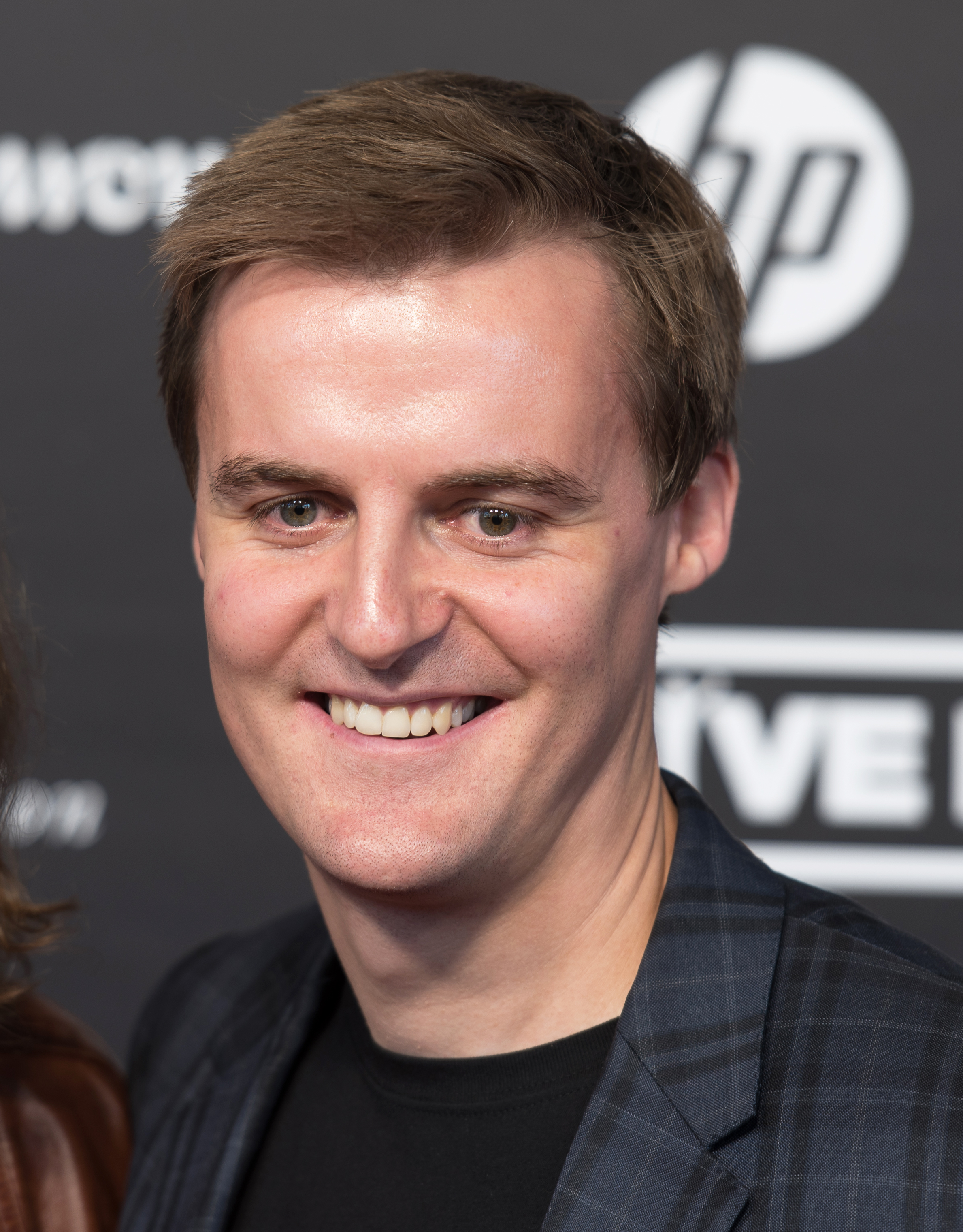
- Evans c. 2017
- Born: Hugh Evans; 4 March 1983 (age 43); Melbourne, Victoria, Australia
- Education: Carey Baptist Grammar School
- Alma mater: Monash University
- Known for: Humanitarianism and youth voluntary leadership

Hugh Evans (born 4 March 1983) is an Australian humanitarian. Evans is the co-founder of both The Oaktree Foundation and Global Citizen, formerly called Global Poverty Project, and Executive Producer of One World:Together at Home and Global Citizen Live. He has received domestic and international accolades for his work in promoting youth advocacy and volunteerism in order to reduce extreme poverty in developing countries.

== Background ==
Evans grew up in Kew with brother Nicholas Evans in the eastern suburbs of Melbourne and was educated at Carey Baptist Grammar School where, aged 12 years, he participated in World Vision's 40-hour famine out of a concern for poverty in developing countries. The following year, Evans subsequently won a World Vision-sponsored contest to visit development programs in the Philippines and was moved by his encounters in the slums of Manila. Evans went on exchange to Woodstock School in the Himalayas in India two years later. Recalling his experience from notes in his memoir at the time of his return:

The greatest injustice I witnessed this year happened, not when comparing the poor of India to the rich of India, but upon arriving home. I couldn't understand why we as Australians are so determined, even to the point of complaining, to get the latest mobile phone ... then comparing this to walking through the market of India and seeing a man with no legs, simply a piece of rubber tied to his waist to stop the skin on his pelvis from scraping away ... all he asks for is the equivalent of 20 cents.

A further trip to the rural valley communities of the KwaZulu-Natal province in South Africa, where he volunteered as a youth ambassador with World Vision, saw him return to Melbourne in 2003 moved to bring about social change.

In 2008, Evans graduated with law and science degrees at Monash University.

== Youth advocacy ==
=== Oaktree Foundation ===
In 2003 Evans, together with Nicolas Mackay established The Oaktree Foundation, an Australian-based non-government organisation that provides aid and development to countries in need across the Asia Pacific and African regions. Oaktree is run by young people aged 16 to 26, overseen by an advisory board, and has since grown into an effective vehicle for youth advocacy in Australia providing for education in developing countries. Evans was the inaugural chief executive officer, standing down in 2008, and continues with The Oaktree Foundation in an advisory capacity.

Evans' early inspiration and support of The Oaktree Foundation was provided by St Hilary's, a large evangelical Anglican parish in the eastern suburbs of Melbourne.

=== Global Citizen and The Global Poverty Project ===
Inspired by Al Gore's film An Inconvenient Truth, Evans and Simon Moss established the Global Poverty Project, a community education group that aims to increase awareness of, and action towards fighting extreme poverty. The Global Poverty Project was started in 2008 with a US$60,000 grant from the United Nations and an A$350,000 grant from AusAID. Included in Evans' activism for the Global Poverty Project is the Make Poverty History campaign and concerts in Australia.

== Awards and other leadership roles ==
In 2001, Evans was one of sixteen Australian representatives to participate in The Hague International Model United Nations (THIMUN) held in The Hague, Netherlands; and in 2003, he was awarded the Young Victorian of the Year. The following year, Evans was named as the Young Australian of the Year for his contribution in promoting youth advocacy through the founding of The Oaktree Foundation. In 2004 Evans was also awarded the title of an Outstanding Young Persons of the World, one of ten young people recognised annually by the Junior Chamber International. Evans's award for humanitarianism and/or voluntary leadership in that year was shared with Queen Rania of Jordan and Ch'ng Joo Beng of Malaysia.

In 2008, Evans, together with the federal Minister for Youth, Kate Ellis MP, served as co-chair of the 2020 Youth Summit, a precursor to the 2020 Summit.

Awards/Achievements

- 2003 - Young Victorian of the Year
- 2003 - Co-founded Oaktree Foundation
- 2004 - Young Australian of the Year
- 2005 - Junior Chamber International Person of the World
- 2008 - Co-chair of the inaugural 2020 Youth Summit
- 2008 - Co-founded Global Poverty Project, later Global Citizen
- 2012 - Featured in Forbes 30 Under 30 List
- 2014 - Named one of Fast Company's 100 Most Creative People
- 2014 - Honorary Doctorate, Utah State University
- 2014 - GQ Man of the Year Award for Chivalry
- 2015 - Billboard magazine's Humanitarian of the Year
- 2015 - Advance Global Australian Social Impact Award Winner
- 2016 - Delivered TED talk titled What Does it Mean to be a Citizen of the World?
- 2017 - Profiled on The Brave Ones special produced by CNBC
- 2018 - Received the Diamond Ball Award for humanitarian efforts to end poverty
- 2020 - Executive Producer, One World Together at Home Concert to end COVID-19 Together at Home
- 2021 - Recipient of The George H.W. Bush Points of Light Award
- 2024 - Appointed to the advisory board of Climate Cardinals, one of the world's largest youth-led climate organizations
- 2025 - Recipient of the 2025 Sunhak Peace Prize

Awards
Preceded by Lleyton Hewitt	Young Australian of the Year; 2004	Succeeded by Khoa Do
Preceded by Karen Chatto	Young Victorian of the Year; 2003	Succeeded by Cameron Rahles-Rahbula
