= Oaktree (foundation) =

Australian NGO

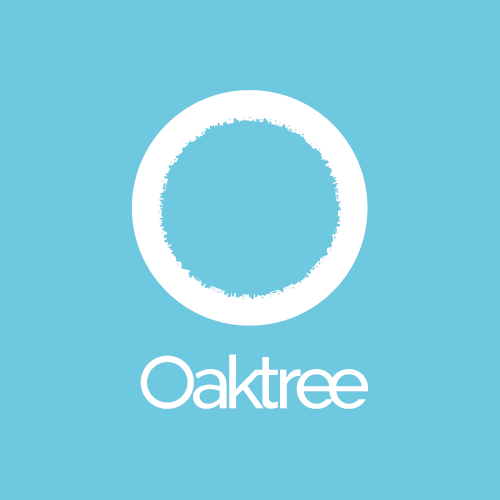
- Founded: 2003 and incorporated on 13 February 2008
- Founder: Hugh Evans and Nicolas Mackay
- Type: International aid and development charity
- Purpose: International development, youth empowerment, upskilling and capacity building.
- Location: Carlton, Victoria, Australia
- Region served: Asia-Pacific
- Method: Political advocacy and development through partnership, led by young people
- Members: 200,000 (2014)
- Key people: Charli English, CEO
- Revenue: A$2.27m (2013)
- Volunteers: 150 (2014)
- Website: oaktree.org
- Formerly called: The Oaktree Foundation

Oaktree is an Australian-based, non-government organisation that specialises in international youth development. Their purpose is to lead, demand and create a more just world. Founded in 2003, the organisation is run by young people aged 16 to 26, and overseen by an advisory board.

Oaktree collaborates with youth partners in countries including Timor-Leste and Cambodia.

In Australia, Oaktree focuses on upskilling young people and advocating for the value of youth voices. Their community-driven campaigns connect young Australian voices to decision-makers to influence policy change on issues of justice, like Australian aid.

== History ==
Oaktree was founded in Melbourne by Hugh Evans and Nicolas Mackay in 2003. After winning a World Vision contest to visit development programs in the Philippines, aged 13 years, Evans went on exchange to Woodstock School in the Himalayas in India two years later. A further trip to the rural valley communities of the KwaZulu-Natal Province in South Africa, where he volunteered with World Vision, saw him return to Melbourne in 2003 and join with Mackay and other young people to establish Oaktree, with the purpose of combating some of the inequalities that Evans had witnessed. In October 2013, Oaktree launched a new brand and website to mark its 10th birthday.

Oaktree has invested over A$2.5 million into aid development projects between 2003 and 2012.

== Mission ==
The mission statement of Oaktree as of 2018 is "Oaktree is young people leading, demanding and creating a more just world." Oaktree aspires to achieve its mission in three ways:

1. Funding education and leadership projects overseas which build capacity and empower young leaders in the Asia Pacific region.
2. Building the capacity and influence of young people in Australia.
3. Influencing policy change towards a more just world.

As of October 2013, Oaktree has an office in every Australian state and in the Australian Capital Territory. With 125,000 supporters and 350 volunteer staff as at 31 December 2011, Oaktree generated A$1.76 million in revenue.

== International development projects ==
Oaktree supports the following international aid and development:

1. Cambodia: Beacon's School Initiative by redeveloping school environments to better suit the climate and culture
2. East Timor: Youth Livelihoods that provides income generation opportunities for youth groups in the Aileu districts
3. East Timor: Youth Empowerment Peace Building Project that builds capacity for young people to prevent, manage and resolve violent situations peacefully and without violence
4. South Africa: HIV/Aids Peer Mentorship Scheme that aims to reduce the incidence of HIV infection among high school aged students in the province of KwaZulu Natal
5. Papua New Guinea: Men and Women's Vocational Training Project that works to address issues of gender inequality, youth unemployment, low literacy rates and lack of vocational training in Port Moresby
6. Papua New Guinea: Yangis Community School Teacher Training to give people in the remote location of Yangis a higher education so that a school will be re-opened in their community

In 2022, the foundation launched the Youth Solidarity Fund to support the growth of grassroots youth organisations in the Asia-Pacific region.

== National programs ==
Oaktree runs educational programs that aim to transform Australians into dedicated and effective agents of change in acting on extreme poverty.

Live Below the Line, run in partnership between Oaktree and the Global Poverty Project, is a five-day extreme poverty awareness and fundraising campaign. The campaign encourages members of the general public in Australia, New Zealand, the United States, and the United Kingdom to participate in order to develop a better understanding of the daily challenges faced by the 1.4 billion people experiencing extreme poverty. For each of the five days of the campaign the participants are encouraged to limit their food expenditure to the equivalent of the extreme poverty line, set at US$1.25. The participants use their daily experiences to bring extreme poverty to the awareness of others. During 2011, this program generated A$1.4 million from 6,518 participants.

Other smaller programs include Generate and Schools 4 Schools focused on advocacy and peer-to-peer education respectively.

In 2009, Oaktree claimed that, together with World Vision and other advocacy groups, their advocacy via the End Child Slavery campaign contributed to an announcement by Cadbury Australia that it will change its milk chocolate range to fair trade sources.

In 2020, Oaktree joined the 'End COVID For All' campaign, a collective group of organisations who support the assistance of vulnerable nations in the light of COVID-19.

== Chief Executive Officers ==
Name	Term
Charli English	2024–present
Zahra Al-Hilaly & Lucie Tolhoek	2023–2024
Thenu Herath	2021–2023
Shani Cain	2019–2020
Sashenka Worsman	2016–2019
Chris Wallace	2014–2017
Viv Benjamin	2012–2014
Tom O'Connor	2009–2012
David Toovey	2008–2009
Hugh Evans	2003–2008
