= Crime After Crime (film) =

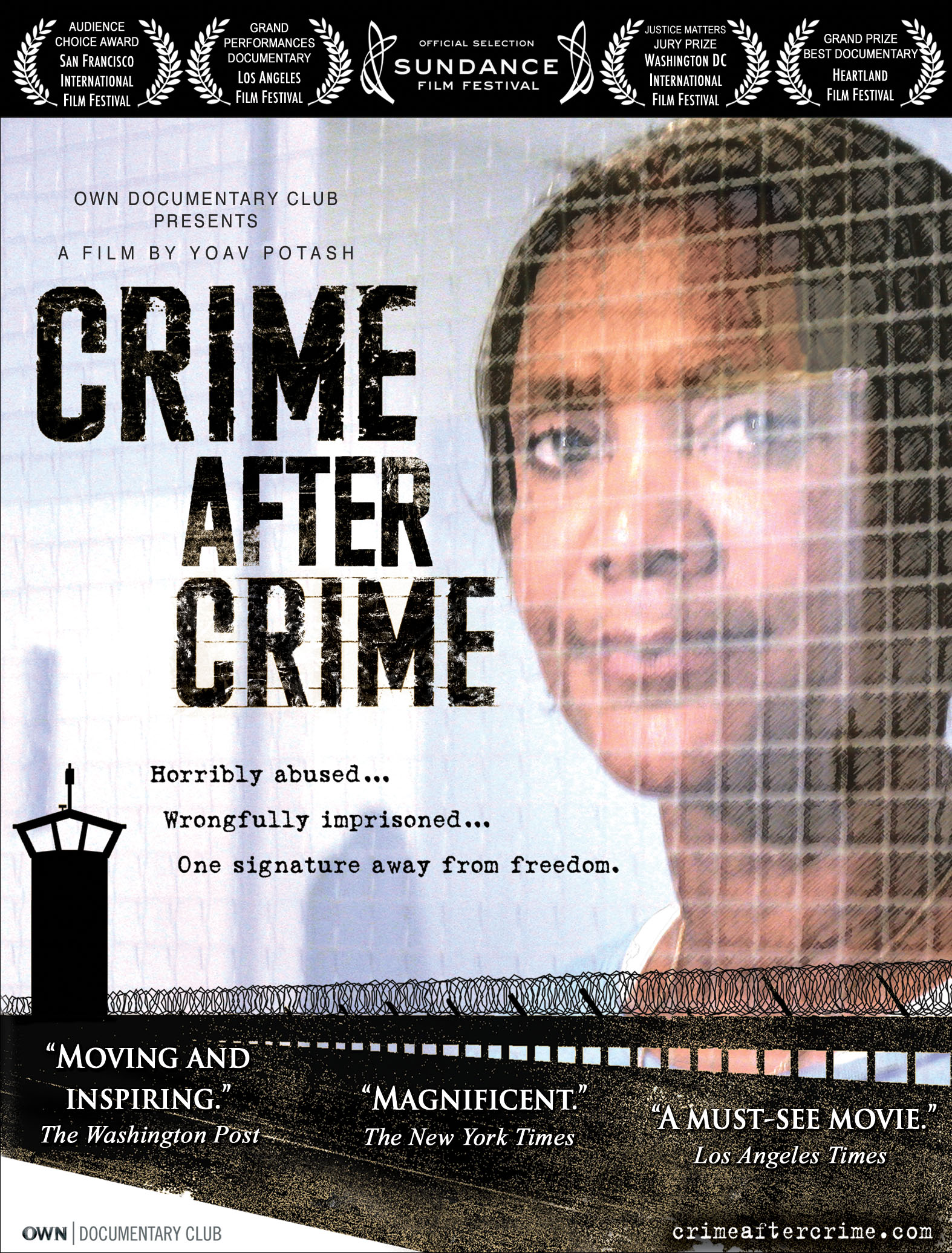
- Directed by: Yoav Potash
- Starring: Deborah Peagler; Joshua Safran; Nadia Costa
- Release dates: January 21, 2011 (Sundance); July 1, 2011 (United States)
- Country: United States

Crime After Crime is a 2011 award-winning documentary film directed by Yoav Potash about the case of Deborah Peagler, an incarcerated victim of domestic violence whose case was taken up by pro bono attorneys through The California Habeas Project.

== Synopsis ==
Crime After Crime tells the dramatic story of the legal battle to free Debbie Peagler, an incarcerated survivor of domestic violence. She was wrongly convicted of the murder of her abusive boyfriend and sentenced to 25 years to life in prison.

Her story takes an unexpected turn two decades later when two rookie land-use attorneys step forward to take her case. Through their perseverance, they bring to light long-lost witnesses, new testimonies from the men who committed the murder, and proof of perjured evidence. Their investigation ultimately attracts global attention to victims of wrongful incarceration and abuse and becomes a matter of life and death once more.

== Production ==
Potash produced Crime After Crime over a five-and-a-half-year span, gaining unprecedented access to film in a maximum-security California prison, despite strict rules that barred members of the media from filming interviews with specific inmates. The filmmaker managed to bring his cameras into the prison by becoming the "legal videographer" for Debbie Peagler, and by producing an entirely separate documentary about the rehabilitative and employment programs available to inmates at the prison. Potash wrote about these activities and his motivations for making the film in articles published by The Wall Street Journal and TheWrap.

During production, Potash filmed the music group Arrested Development as they visited Debbie Peagler in prison and sang with Peagler and the inmate gospel choir that she led. Their visit was meant to support Peagler's legal battle for her freedom, and call attention to the plight of other victims of abuse and wrongful incarceration. The band's performance of the Solomon Burke song "None of Are Free," with Peagler and the choir accompanying Arrested Development, is excerpted in the film and played in its entirety over the end credits.

The film was funded by the Sundance Documentary Film Program, the San Francisco Foundation, the Lynn and Jules Kroll Fund for Jewish Documentary Film at the Foundation for Jewish Culture, the Pacific Pioneer Fund, the Bay Area Video Coalition, the Women in Film Foundation Film Finishing Fund supported by Netflix, the Jewish Federation of the Greater East Bay, and Jewish Family and Children's Services of San Francisco.

== Release ==
The film was picked up by the Oprah Winfrey Network for broadcast and home video distribution. OWN gave the film a national television primetime premiere in November 2011. PBS NewsHour also broadcast a nine-minute excerpt of the film as part of its Economist Film Project, as a collaboration with The Economist. The film streamed for two years on Netflix and now streams here on Amazon Prime.

== Reception ==
"Crime After Crime" earned strong praise from critics and audiences alike. On Amazon Prime, the film earned a 5-star average rating from user reviews, and the streaming service describes the film as "one of the most compelling and highly awarded documentaries of all time." The film received a 91% positive approval score on Rotten Tomatoes, based on 32 reviews, with an average rating of 7.2/10. On Metacritic, the film has a weighted average score of 72 out of 100, based on 16 critics, indicating "generally favorable" reviews. It also holds a rating of 4.2 out of 5 stars on Netflix, generated from an average from 104,747 user ratings.

The film premiered at the Sundance Film Festival in January 2011, and went on to earn a total of 25 major honors including the Robert F. Kennedy Journalism Award, The National Board of Review's Freedom of Expression Award, and The Hillman Prize for Broadcast Journalism.

The film was a New York Times Critics' Pick. In her review of Crime After Crime, The New York Times film critic Jeanette Catsoulis called the film a "wrenching documentary" and wrote that its portrayal of Debbie Peagler "makes it difficult to leave the theater with dry eyes and an untouched heart." She added that filmmaker Yoav Potash's "moral outrage is magnificent, swelling from hushed to howling without the help of narration or posturing from the unfailingly dignified Ms. Peagler or her quietly dedicated lawyers."

The Washington Post listed the film as an Editors' Pick. The Post's film critic Stephanie Merry began her review with: "Some movies prove so eye-opening that a viewer may feel the urge to recount the story, start to finish, to friends and acquaintances. Crime After Crime is that kind of film. The shocking, emotional documentary follows an abused, incarcerated woman whose quest for freedom meets a never-ending series of outlandish obstacles."

New York Magazine also listed the film as a Critics' Pick, calling the film "riveting and devastating", and describing it as a story about "a great miscarriage of justice — but also one of heroic legal perseverance, with a surprisingly colorful cast of characters."

The Los Angeles Times listed the documentary as "a must-see film" and The Hollywood Reporter described the film as "a tremendously moving story, strong in social commitment and deftly woven out of years of footage." Upon its Sundance Film Festival premiere, The Salt Lake Tribune called the film "a riveting examination of justice denied through political manipulation and prosecutorial callousness."

Among the first honors bestowed upon the film were the Henry Hampton Award for Excellence in Film and Digital Media, presented by the Council on Foundations, and the Pursuit of Justice Award, presented by the California Women's Law Center.

In May 2011, the film won both the Audience Award for Best Documentary and the Golden Gate Award for Documentary Feature at the 54th annual San Francisco International Film Festival, the first of several festivals to give the film multiple awards.

=== Awards ===
- Audience Award, Atlanta Jewish Film Festival
- Audience Award, Berkshire International Film Festival
- Audience Award, Heartland Film Festival
- Audience Award, Rochester Jewish Film Festival
- Audience Award, San Francisco International Film Festival
- Audience Award (fiction or documentary), Spokane International Film Festival
- Best Documentary, Berkshire International Film Festival
- Best Documentary, Spokane International Film Festival
- Best Editing, Milan International Film Festival
- Crystal Heart Award, Heartland Film Festival
- Documentary Grand Prize, Heartland Film Festival
- Freedom of Expression Award, National Board of Review
- Gold SpIFFy for Best Documentary, Spokane International Film Festival
- Golden Gate Award for Investigative Documentary Feature, San Francisco International Film Festival
- Grand Prize, San Antonio Film Festival
- Henry Hampton Award for Excellence in Film & Digital Media, Council on Foundations Film Festival
- Hillman Prize for Broadcast Journalism, The Sydney Hillman Foundation
- Humanitas Prize, Documentaries - Special Awards Category (Nominee)
- Jury Award, Bellingham Human Rights Film Festival
- Justice Matters Jury Prize, Washington DC International Film Festival
- Prevention for a Safer Society Award, National Council on Crime and Delinquency
- Pursuit of Justice Award, California Women's Law Center
- Robert F. Kennedy Journalism Award, Robert F. Kennedy Center for Justice & Human Rights
- Sundance Film Festival, Grand Jury Prize (Nominee)
- Whitehead Award, Whitehead Film Festival

== See also ==
- Sin by Silence, an award-winning documentary about the first inmate-led battered women's support group in U.S. prison history
- Defending Our Lives, a short documentary
