= Cameron Rahles-Rahbula =

Australian Paralympic alpine skier

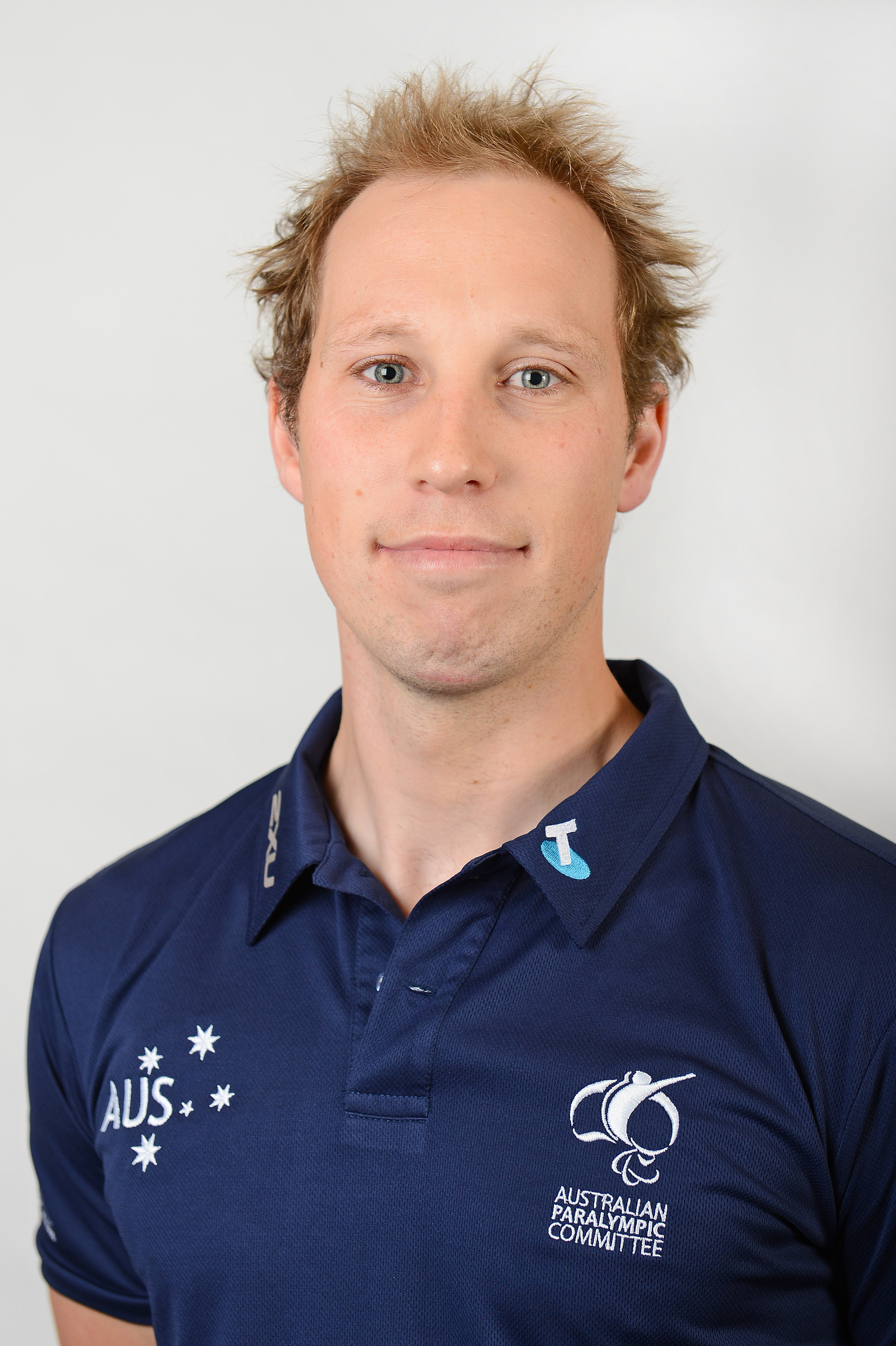
- Cameron Rahles- Rahbula April 2013

Personal information
- Nationality: Australian
- Born: 9 July 1983 (age 43) Camperdown, Victoria

Sport
- Sport: Para-alpine skiing
- Disability class: LW2
- Events: Downhill; Super-G giant slalom slalom Super combined
Medal record
Men's alpine skiing
Winter Paralympic Games
Bronze medal – third place	2010 Vancouver	Men's slalom standing
Bronze medal – third place	2010 Vancouver	Men's Super Combined standing
IPC Alpine Skiing World Championships
Gold medal – first place	2004 Wildschönau	Men's super-G LW2
Gold medal – first place	2004 Wildschönau	Men's downhill LW2
Gold medal – first place	2009 Jeongseon	Men's slalom standing
Silver medal – second place	2004 Wildschönau	Men's slalom LW2
Bronze medal – third place	2009 Jeongseon	Men's giant slalom standing
New Zealand Winter Games
Gold medal – first place	2011 Queenstown	Giant slalom standing
Gold medal – first place	2011 Queenstown	Super-G standing
Silver medal – second place	2011 Queenstown	Slalom standing

Cameron Rahles-Rahbula (born 9 July 1983) is an Australian former Paralympic alpine skier. He won two bronze medals at the 2010 Winter Paralympics in Vancouver. He represented Australia in four Paralympics, stating with the 2002 Winter Paralympics in Salt Lake City and the 2006 Winter Paralympics in Turin. He did not compete in any events at the 2014 Winter Paralympics in Sochi due to knee and ankle injuries sustained during the warm up for the downhill event of the Games but carried the Australian flag (albeit on crutches) in the Parade of Nations at the Opening Ceremony. He also won two gold medals and a silver medal at the 2004 IPC Alpine Skiing World Championships in Wildschönau, Austria, and a gold and a bronze medal at the 2009 World Championships in Jeongseon, Korea. He retired after the Sochi Games.

== Personal ==
Cameron Rahles-Rahbula was born in Camperdown, Victoria, on 9 July 1983. He was diagnosed with osteosarcoma, a rare form of bone cancer at the age of 12 and after unsuccessful chemotherapy had his left leg amputated above the knee at the age of 14. He attended a weekend ski camp at Mount Buller organised by Challenge, a children's cancer support network two weeks after his amputation. Within three days, he was able to ski by himself and this was the start of his Paralympic skiing career.

Rahles-Rahbula attended Geelong Grammar School. He went to Timbertop, for a year, where intense physical training — running, hiking and other outdoor programs — are required. At university, he studied physiotherapy at the University of Melbourne and currently works as a physiotherapist.

He married Emily Jansen on 4 December 2010. Jansen had become Australia's first female Paralympic skier when she competed at the 2006 Winter Paralympics in Turin. They have two sons named Archie and Finn.

In 2023, Rahles-Rahbula was found guilty of recording a private activity without consent and attempting to produce child abuse material after covertly filming a topless 17-year old student during a treatment session at Geelong Grammar School. Magistrate Simon Guthrie, sitting in the Geelong Magistrates Court, rejected claims that the video started by accident. Magistrate Guthrie did not record a criminal conviction, instead placing Rahles-Rahbula on a two-year adjourned undertaking and ordering him to pay a $5000 fine. His physiotherapy registration with the Physiotherapy Board of Australia has been suspended.

== Career ==
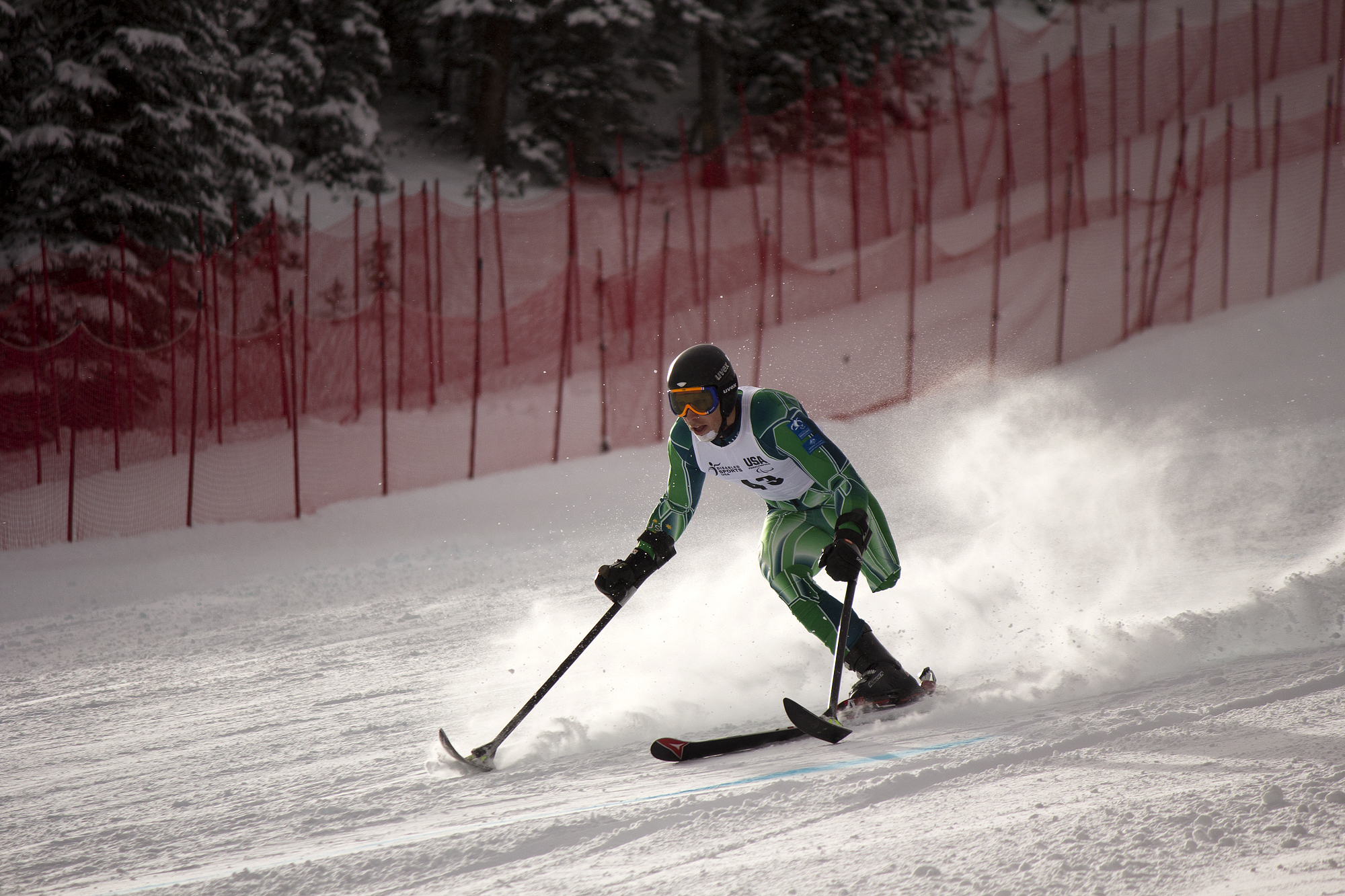
Cameron Rahles Rahbula competing in the super-G during the second day of the 2012 IPC Nor Am Cup at Copper Mountain

Cameron Rahles Rahbula, Mitchell Gourley and Toby Kane interview originally done for Wikinews

Rahles-Rahbula's first major success was 2nd place in the giant slalom at the 2001 National Championships at Mount Hotham. He competed at the 2002 Winter Paralympics in Salt Lake City in four LW2 men's events – downhill (9th), slalom (17th), giant slalom (did not finish) and super-G (did not finish). At the 2006 Winter Paralympics in Turin, he competed in four standing events, coming 14th in the slalom and did not finish in the downhill, giant slalom and super-G.

At the 2010 Winter Paralympics in Vancouver, Rahles-Rahbula won bronze medals in the men's slalom standing event and the men's super combined standing event. He finished 4th in the downhill, 6th in the giant slalom and 5th in the super-G. He was the Australian flag bearer at the closing ceremony at the 2010 Vancouver Games.

At the 2004 IPC Alpine Skiing World Championships in Wildschönau, Austria, Rahles-Rahbula won two gold medals in the super-G and downhill and silver medal in the slalom. At the 2009 IPC Alpine Skiing World Championships at High Resort 1 in Jeongseon County, Korea, he won a gold medal in the men's slalom standing and a bronze medal in the men's giant slalom standing. He competed in three events at the 2011 IPC Alpine Skiing World Championships in Sestriere, Italy, but did not win any medals.

The IPC Alpine Skiing World Cup in Thredbo, New South Wales in September 2013 was intended to be his last competition due to the desire to spend more time with his family. At this event, he won a gold medal in the slalom and silver in giant slalom. In December 2013, he announced that he would aim to compete at the 2014 Winter Paralympics in Sochi. His return to competitive skiing with the support of his wife Emily was subject to his training program allowing for more family time.

On 4 March 2014, he was named as the Australian flag bearer at the 2014 Winter Paralympics Opening Ceremony. Less than a day after being named as flag bearer, he had training accident, fracturing his knee and injuring ankle. He was not able to compete in any of his events. He played an important role in supporting the Australian Team during the Games, and announced that he was retiring.

== Recognition ==
- 2004 – Young Victorian of the Year for his work with young skiers with a disability.
- 2004 – University of Melbourne Sports Athlete of the Year
- 2004/2005 – Local Citizen of the Year by Corangamite Shire Council in Victoria
- 2010 – Australian Paralympian of the Year and Male Athlete of the Year
- 2010 – Australian Flag Bearer for Closing Ceremony at 2010 Winter Paralympics
- 2014 – Australian Flag Bearer for Opening Ceremony at 2014 Winter Paralympics

Awards and achievements
Preceded by Hugh Evans	Young Victorian of the Year; 2004	Succeeded by Lisa Castle
