= Victorian of the Year =

- Awarded for: Achievement and contribution to community and public service in Victoria
- Date: 1 July
- Location: Melbourne Town Hall
- Country: Victoria (Australia)
- Presented by: Victoria Day Council
- Website: victoriaday.org.au

The Victorian of the Year is an award given to the most outstanding Victorian in any given year. The Victorian of the Year is awarded in Melbourne by the Victoria Day Council as part of Victoria Day celebrations on 1 July annually.

The Victoria Day Awards are made by public nomination and selected by the Awards Committee and ratified by the Trustees of the Victoria Day Council. The Victoria Day Awards are nominated and voted by Victorians.

The Victorian of the Year should not be confused with the Victorian winner of Australian of the Year, awarded in Canberra by the Australia Day Council as part of Australia Day celebrations on 26 January annually. The same people may be winners of both awards.

Other awards in the same series include the Young Victorian of the Year, Organisation of the Year, Good Corporate Citizen, the Arts Award and Local Achiever.

== List of winners ==
The following individuals and organisations have been recipients in various classes under the Victoria Day Awards:

Year	Victorian of the Year	Young Victorian of the Year	Organisation of the Year	Good Corporate Citizen	Arts Award	Local Achiever
1995	Sang Nguyen					
1996	Michael Quinn	Deanne Jakial				
1997	Hugh Wirth AM	Lynn Costello	Country Fire Authority			
1998	Andrew Kay	Richard Allen	Road Trauma Support Team (Vic) Inc	Visy		
1999	Sue Natrass	George Dukas	Surf Life Saving (Victoria)	Shannon's Corporation		
2000	Susan Barton AM	Jesse Martin OAM	Anti-Cancer Council	Graeme Goldsworthy		
2001	Neil Comrie AM, APM	Daniela Di Toro	Victorian Women's Prison Council; Disabled Motorists (Victoria)	Bunnings Building Supplies	Jeanne Pratt AO	
2002	Bruce Ruxton AM, OBE	Karen Chatto	Asthma Foundation	Ron Clarke	Margaret Rich	
2003	Jim Stynes OAM	Hugh Evans	VicDeaf	Bendigo Bank	Royal South Street Society	
2004	Tim Costello AO	Cameron Rahles-Rahbula	Lord Somers Camp	Toyota Australia	Adam Elliott	
2005	Dame Elisabeth Murdoch AC, DBE	Lisa Castle	Aids, Hepatitis & Sexual Health Line	Jayco	Victorian Youth Symphony Orchestra	Sergeant Gary Chandler (VICPOL)
2006	Les Twentyman AO	Eliza Stankovic	Lighthouse Foundation	Fantastic Furniture		
2007	Carrillo Gantner AO	Tom O'Connor	Try Youth and Community Services	TRUenergy		
2008	Bert Newton AM, MBE	Daniel Adams	KIDS under cover	Royal Automobile Club of Victoria		
2009	Ron Barassi AM	Thom Woodroofe	The Salvation Army	Ritchies Stores		
2010	Stephanie Alexander AO	Wesa Chau	Rescued With Love	Mecu		
2011	Father Bob Maguire AM, RFD	Amit Menghani	Country Women's Association	Incolink		
2012	Moira Kelly AO	Victor Victor	Travellers Aid	Pitcher Partners		
2013	Jeanne Pratt AC	Nicholle Hussey	Amaze (Autism Victoria)	Linfox	Dr Gerard Vaughan	
2014	David Penington AC	Melissa Tumeo	Willing Older Workers	Qenos	Penny Hutchinson	
2015	Judith Durham AO	Luba Josevski	Scope	Cabrini Health	Australian Tapestry Workshop	
2016	Dr Alan Finkel AO	Khurram Jahangir Khan	St Kilda Mums	VicSuper	Bendigo Art Gallery	
2017	Mike Brady AM	Dr Robert Gillies	The Epilepsy Foundation of Victoria	Bendigo Bank	Regional Arts Victoria	
2018	Susan Alberti AC	Daniel Poole	The Cathy Freeman Foundation	John Holland Group	Victorian Opera	
2019	Neale Daniher AO	Dr Skye Kinder	The Water Well Project		Channel 31	
2020	None awarded					
2021	None awarded					
2022	Kevin Sheedy AO	Julia Kay	St John Ambulance	Cottons Organic	Footscray Community Arts Centre	
2023	Brett Sutton AO	Madeline Buchner OAM	Victorian Womens Trust	Visy	Castlemaine Art Gallery	
2024	Daryl Somers OAM	Molly Fergus	Laneway Learning	CSL	Victorian Artists Society	
2025	Noel Lim	Mohamed Semra				

== See also ==
- Australian of the Year
