= Deborah Peagler =

Incarcerated victim of abuse

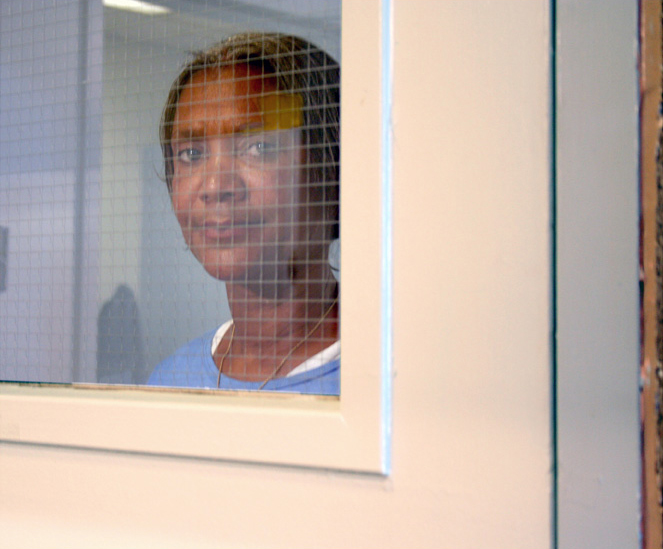
- Deborah "Tripp" Peagler at the Central California Women's Facility. Photo by Yoav Potash, image courtesy of the film Crime After Crime.
- Born: December 27, 1959
- Died: June 8, 2010 (aged 50)
- Children: 2

Deborah Denise Peagler (December 27, 1959, in Pensacola, Florida – June 8, 2010, in Compton, California) was a battered woman who was in prison from 1983 to 2009 for her involvement in the murder of Oliver Wilson, the man who abused her, forced her into prostitution, and molested her daughters. She was also known as "Tripp" (the last name of her first daughter), and as Debbie, Debie, or Debi.

Her personal saga and her legal case are the subject of the documentary Crime After Crime by filmmaker Yoav Potash. The film premiered in January 2011 at the Sundance Film Festival and has since won over 25 awards.

Beginning in the mid to late 1970s, Peagler was beaten and forced into prostitution by Oliver Wilson. In 1982, Peagler’s abuser was beaten and strangled to death by two Crips gang members who were friends of Peagler’s mother. Peagler was accused of first-degree murder alongside one of the gang members; the other gang member was a minor at the time and was charged with a lesser crime.

Peagler never had a trial by jury. Prosecutors threatened to pursue a death sentence against her, and her attorney urged her to plead guilty in order to save her life. She was sentenced to 25 years to life in prison.

In 2002, lawyers Nadia Costa and Joshua Safran from the law firm Bingham McCutchen learned of Peagler's case from The Habeas Project and began working pro bono to free Peagler. Their work relied on a unique California law enacted in 2002. The law gives battered women in prison the chance for a new hearing if the original court never considered evidence relating to abuse.

Her case became controversial in 2005. Peagler's supporters established a website to publicize her cause. In 2008, a California Superior Court Judge removed Los Angeles District Attorney Steve Cooley's entire office from Peagler's case due to allegations of misconduct and conflicts of interest. The California Court of Appeal later reversed that decision, but also found that some of the allegations against the District Attorney's Office were true.

Peagler’s attorneys in 2007 filed suit against the Los Angeles District Attorney over what they alleged was the broken agreement to free their client.

Peagler was incarcerated first at the California Institution for Women, and was later transferred to the Central California Women’s Facility in Chowchilla, California, the largest women’s prison in the country. She directed the prison gospel choir and earned two associate degrees while behind bars.

In February 2009, Peagler was diagnosed with terminal lung cancer, and her lawyers attempted to win her release on bail, but the judge declined the request on technical grounds. On July 10, 2009, she was found suitable for release by the California Board of Parole Hearings. On August 4, 2009, Los Angeles District Attorney Steve Cooley questioned the parole decision in a letter to California Governor Arnold Schwarzenegger in which Cooley suggested that the parole board was wrong to offer Peagler her freedom.

On August 19, 2009, Peagler's family members and community supporters protested outside the Los Angeles office of California Governor Arnold Schwarzenegger, demanding Peagler's release. On August 20, 2009, Governor Schwarzenegger declined to review the parole finding, allowing Peagler to be released on August 22, 2009.

Peagler died of lung cancer while at home with her family on June 8, 2010.
