= California Habeas Project =

The California Habeas Project, also known as The Habeas Project, is a collaboration that advocates for reducing the sentences of domestic violence survivors incarcerated for crimes related to their experiences of being abused. The constituent organizations in the collaborative include: Free Battered Women, Legal Services for Prisoners with Children, California Women's Law Center, USC Post-Conviction Justice Project, and the Los Angeles County Public Defender's Office. The Habeas Project recruits volunteer legal teams from private law firms to represent incarcerated survivors of domestic violence. The Habeas Project began working with women in prison in 2002 after the California penal code was altered to give battered women in California prisons a chance for a new hearing. By 2007, the Habeas Project had facilitated the release of 19 survivors of domestic violence from prison.

According to the Los Angeles Times, The California Habeas Project has also voiced strong criticism of Los Angeles District Attorney Steve Cooley's handling of domestic violence cases.
