= Warsaw Jewish Film Festival =

Annual film festival held in Warsaw, Poland

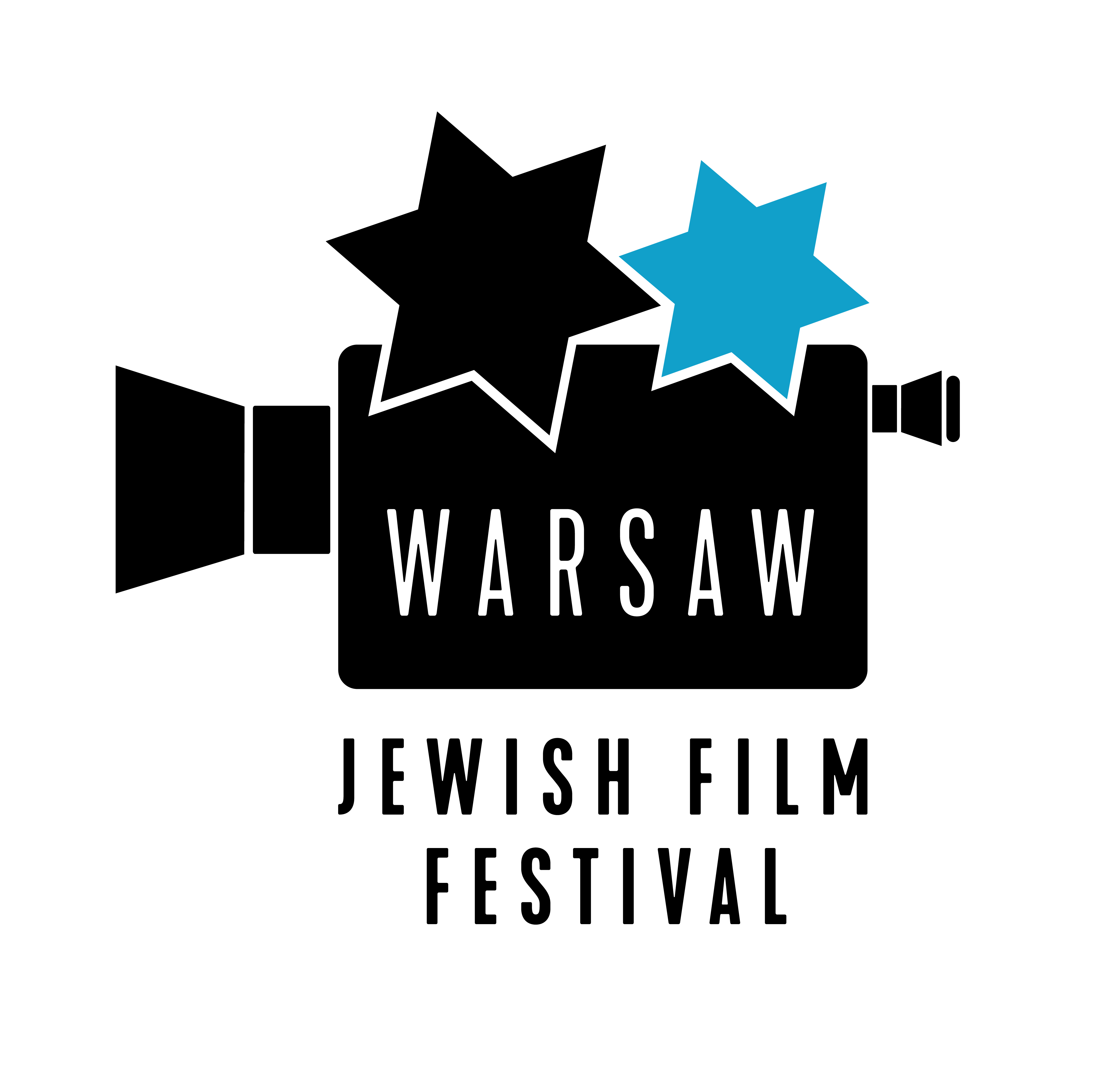
- Location: Warsaw, Poland
- Founded: 2003
- Language: Polish, English, other
- Website: wjff.pl/en/

The Warsaw Jewish Film Festival (Polish: Warszawski Festiwal Filmów o Tematyce Żydowskiej) is an annual Jewish film festival held in Warsaw, Poland.

== History ==
In 2003, Daniel Strehlau, a Polish-American film director founded by his own author idea the pioneering Warsaw Jewish Film Festival (WJFF.pl)—the first festival of its kind in Eastern Europe and of course in Poland — dedicated to the film industry professionals, who create films about Jewish life and culture. Under his leadership (2003–2013), the festival gained international recognition and became an early platform for films that later received Academy Awards and nominations, including Camera of David awarded:

- West Bank Story (Oscar winner)
- Beaufort and Katyń (Oscar nominees)
- Ida (Oscars winner, 2015)

The 22nd edition 2024 opened with the Polish premiere of "A Real Pain," and the festival director Magda Makarczuk introduced the filmmakers on stage: Jesse Eisenberg, Kieran Culkin and Jennifer Grey and producers Ali Herting and Ewa Puszczyńska. The Q & A with distinguished talents was let by Grazyna Torbicka. The movie won "Camera of David" awards and in 2025 "A Real Pain" was awarded Oscar and Oscar Nominations.

== Awards ==
The festival issues annual awards called "Camera of David" (Polish: Kamera Dawida), sketched on the festival's logo. The festival award is a bas-relief depicting a pictogram of a film camera from the 1920s, along with a tripod whose head forms the "Star of David". The creator of the award, Daniel Strehlau, stated that if King David were alive today, he would be a filmmaker, and specifically a filmmaker from Warsaw, Poland.

It is issued separately for categories of feature narratives and feature documentaries, short narratives and short documentaries as well as Honorary Camera of David Award, given to a distinguished individual to whom the festival is dedicated each year.

== Laureates ==
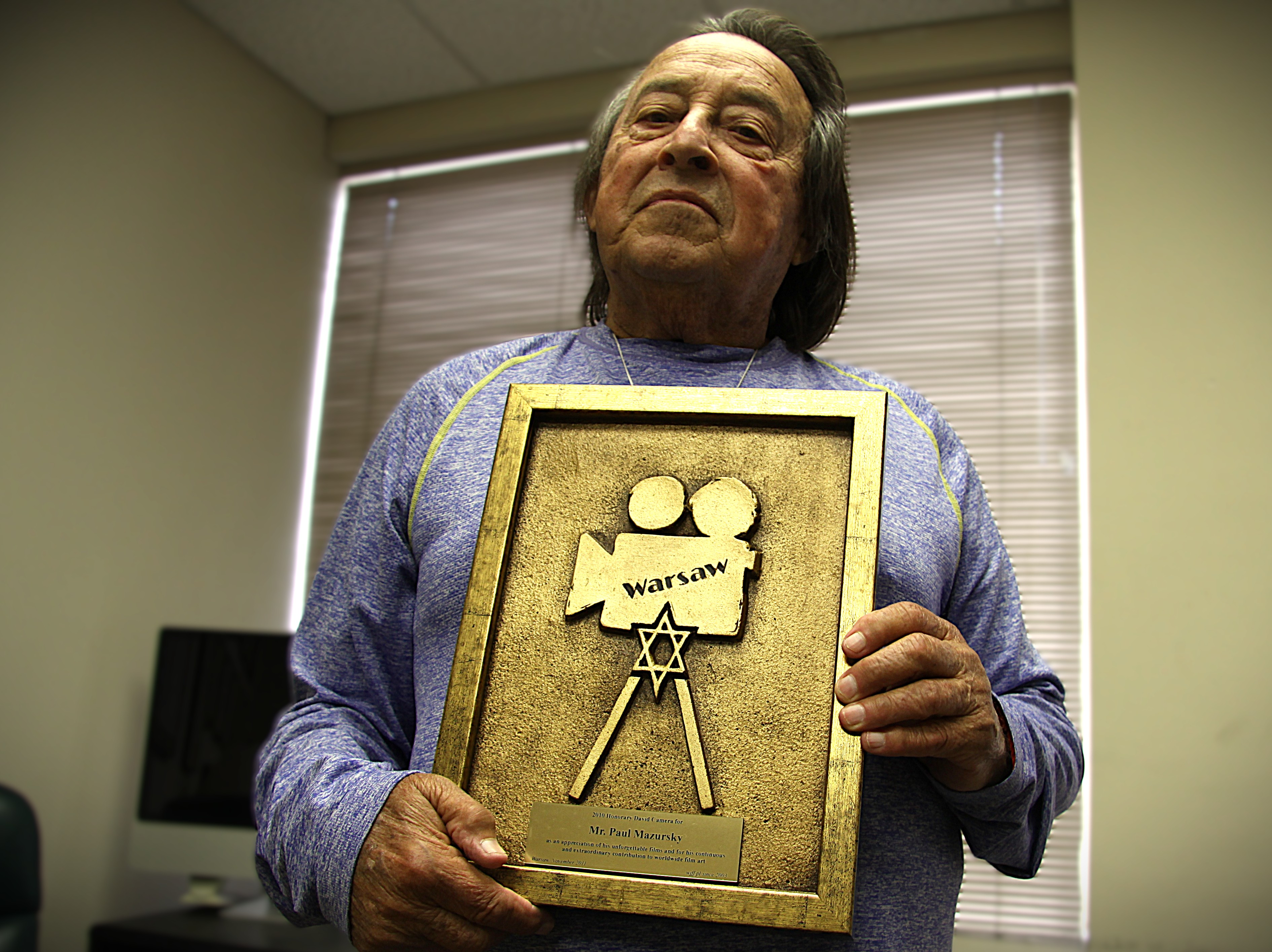
Paul Mazursky & his Honorary Camera of David Award.

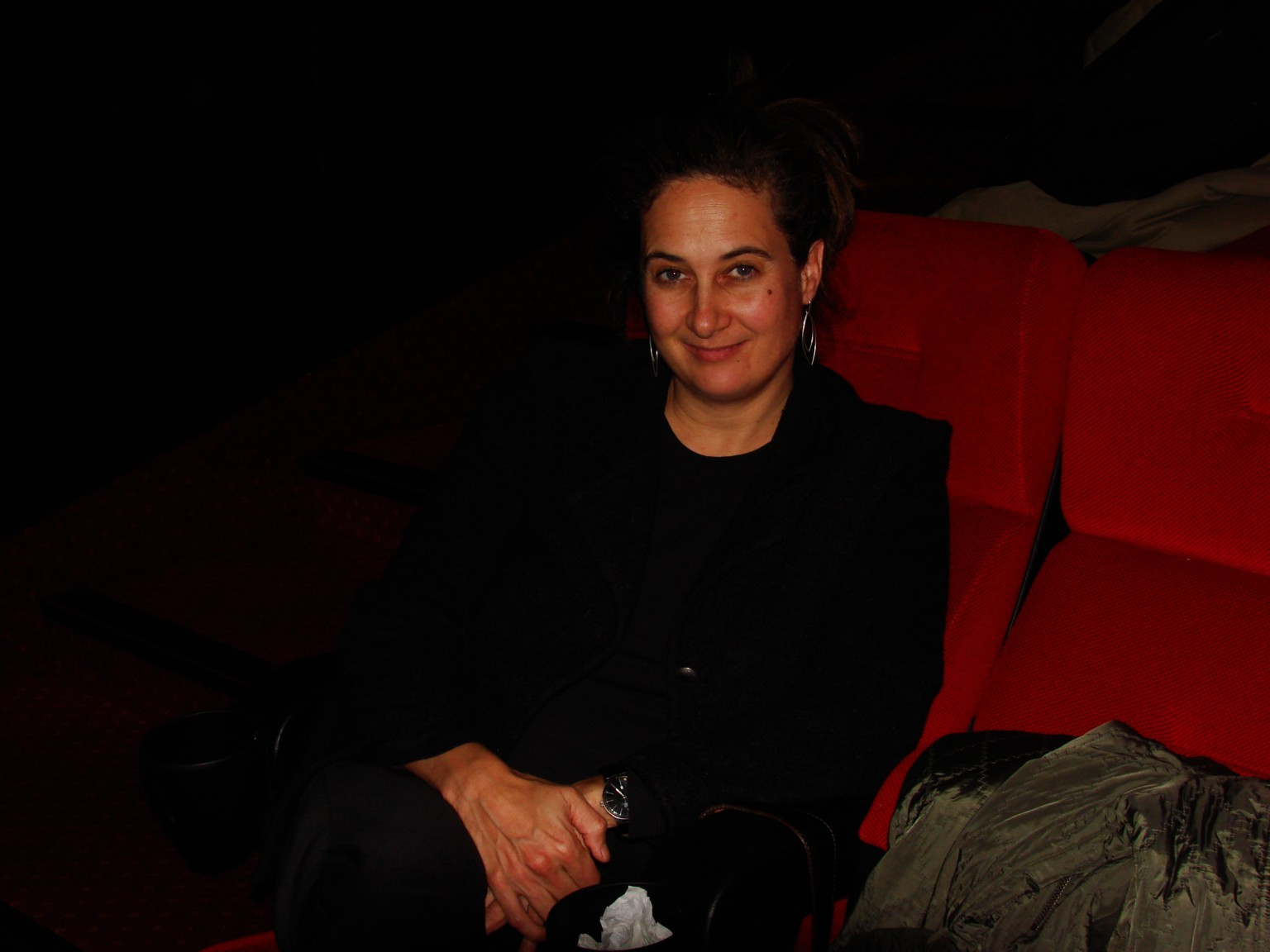
Grace Guggenheim, Jury Chairwoman at 3rd WJFF 2005, Warsaw

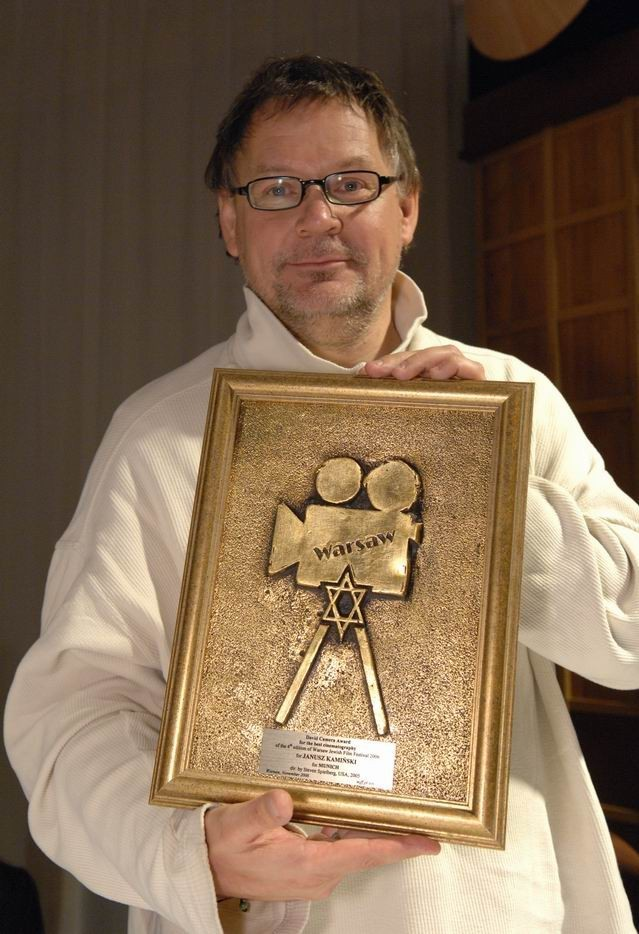
Janusz Kaminski with Camera of David Award 2006 for Best Cinematography in Munich

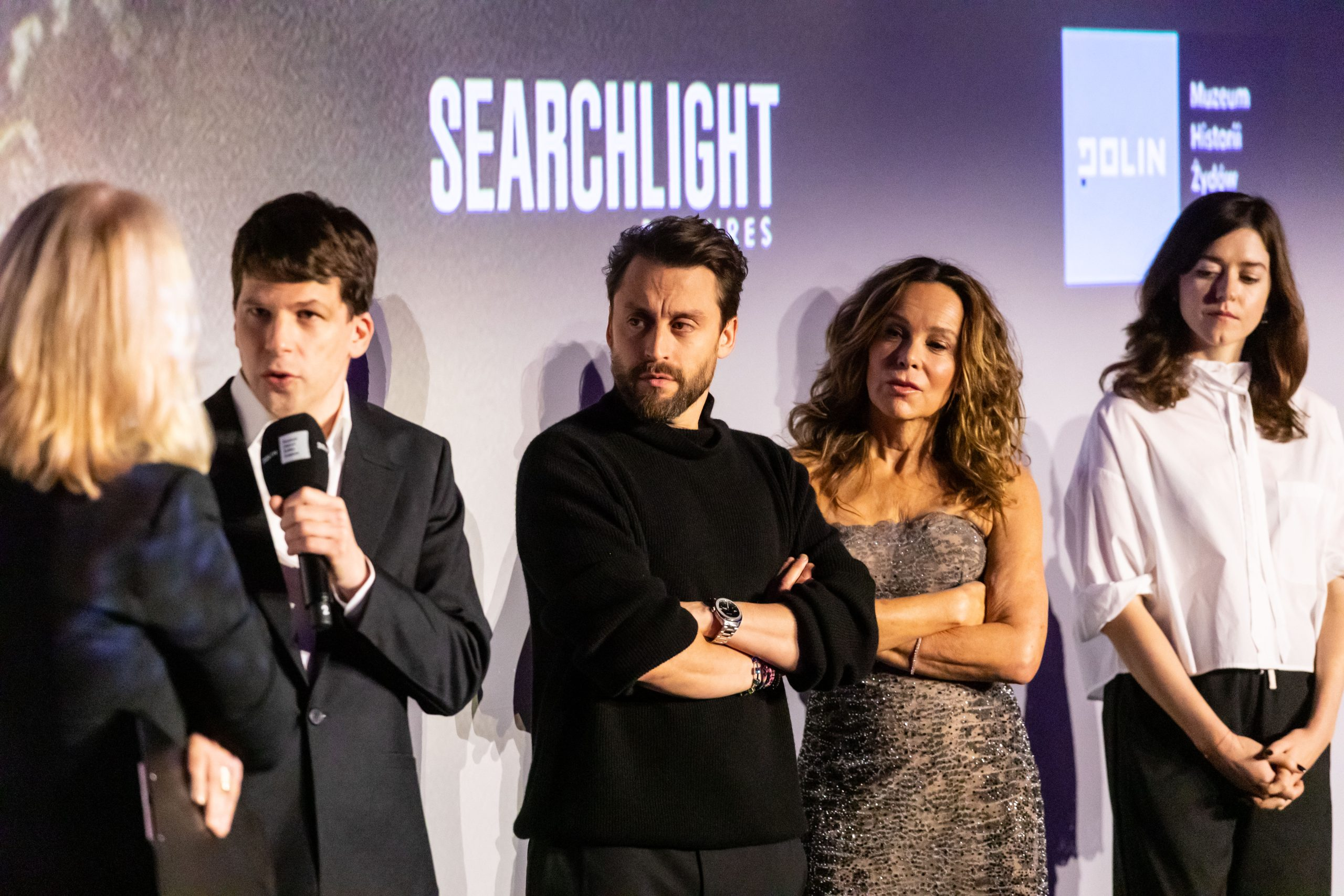
Jesse Eisenberg, Kieran Culkin and Jennifer Grey and producers Ali Herting and Ewa Puszczyńska at the Opneing Ceremony with "A Real Pain" 22nd WJFF 2024

== Leadership ==
Strehlau currently serves as a member of the festival's Honorary Film Selection Committee, while the event continues under the direction of his former wife, Magda Makarczuk-Strehlau, who is also the President of "Camera of David wjff.pl" Foundation. The Deputy Director is Ignacy Strączek.

== Association of European Jewish Film Festivals ==
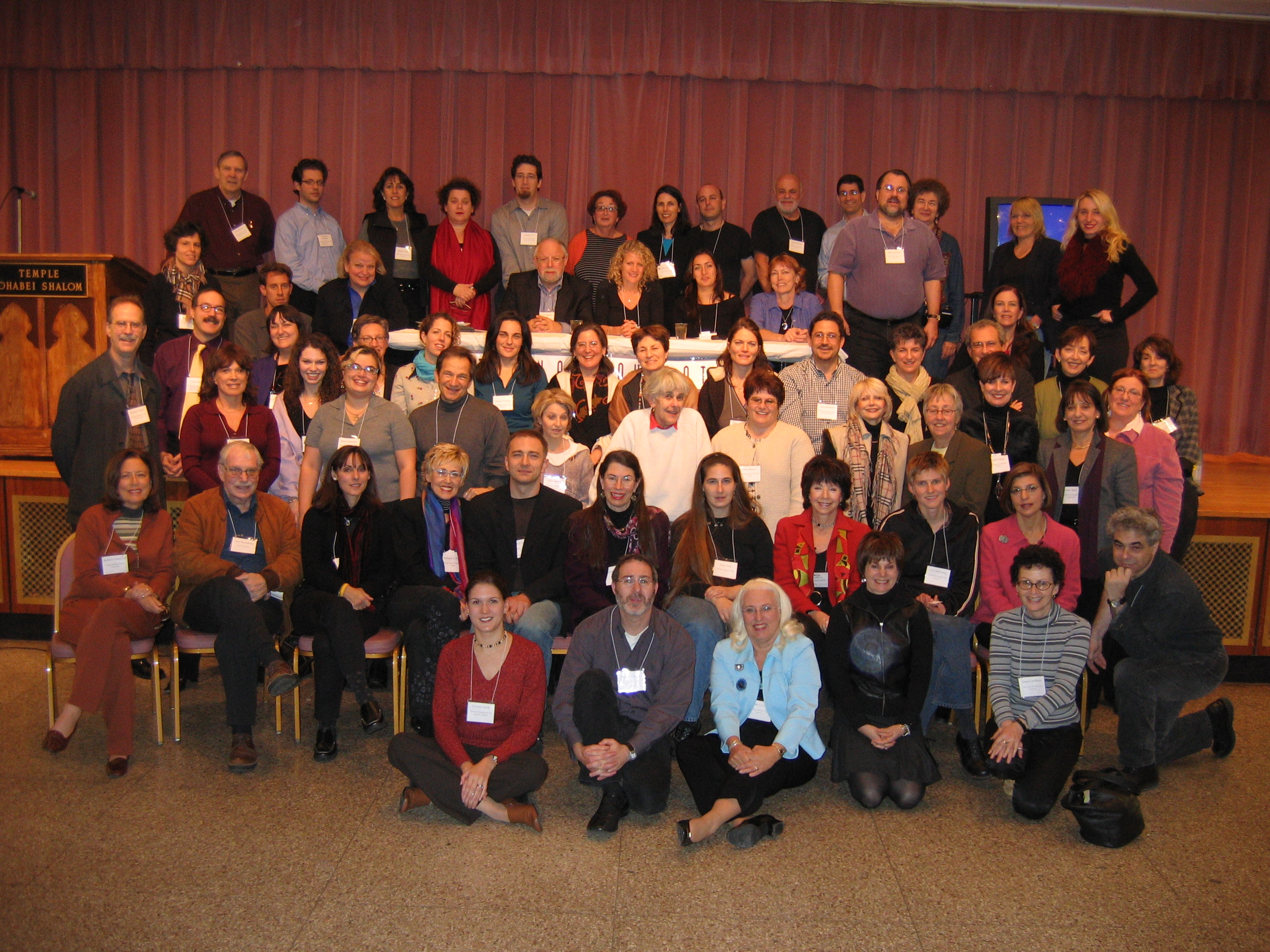
The 4th Conference of Directors of Jewish Film Fest from around the world, Boston 2004

The festival is a member of the Association of European Jewish Film Festivals, which was established during the World Conference of Jewish Film Festival Directors in Boston in 2004.

== See also ==
- POLIN Museum of the History of Polish Jews
