= San Francisco Independent Film Festival =

Annual festival held in San Francisco, California, U.S.

- Genre: Film Festival
- Dates: February
- Frequency: Annual
- Locations: San Francisco, California, U.S.
- Years active: January 1999 – present
- Founded: 1998
- Founder: Jeff Ross
- People: Jeff Ross, Director; Catie Roads-Redhouse, Operations Manager
- Website: sfindie.com

The San Francisco Independent Film Festival, known as San Francisco IndieFest, is an annual film festival that recognizes contemporary independent film. Established in 1998, it is run by SF IndieFest, a non-profit organization, and based at the Roxie Theater in San Francisco, California, United States.

== History ==
The San Francisco Independent Film Festival was founded in 1998 by Jeff Ross, operations manager of the San Francisco International Film Festival and office manager of the San Francisco Film Society, at the end of a decade when independent films had increased in importance. The impetus was that San Francisco independent filmmaker Rand Alexander was unable to find a venue in the city to show Caged, which had premiered at the Slamdance Film Festival.

The first festival took place in January 1999 at the Roxie and Victoria theaters in the Mission District and included 17 feature films and one short, with a focus on experimental and otherwise unconventional works. The second IndieFest was held in January 2000, expanding from four days to nine, and the festival has continued to take place in January or February and further expanded to two weeks. The 2000 IndieFest added animated shorts; in 2002, despite losing corporate sponsorship in the wake of 9/11, the festival added foreign films. Ross directed the festival alone until a program director, Bruce Fletcher, was added.

IndieFest is now based at the Roxie Theater; in addition to the Victoria, it has used other Bay Area theaters including the United Artists Galaxy, the Castro Theatre, the Brava, the Alamo Drafthouse, the Lumiere, and the Fine Arts Cinema in Berkeley. It has become known for the associated parties, particularly the Big Lebowski party. The 20th IndieFest, in 2018, included a film from each previous festival. The 2021 festival, held during the COVID-19 pandemic, was streamed. The 2022 festival had a mix of screenings at the Roxie and virtual events. The festival celebrated its 25th anniversary in 2023, continuing to show films online as well as at the Roxie that year and in 2024. In 2025, live screenings were at the Vogue Theatre as well as the Roxie.

=== Associated events ===
SF IndieFest also runs the spin-off film festivals DocFest, the SF Documentary Film Festival, started in 2001, Another Hole in the Head, a horror and science fiction festival started in 2003, the San Francisco Independent Short Film Festival, started in 2019, and the Livable Planet Festival, which was launched in 2021 as a replacement for the San Francisco Green Film Festival, which folded after the COVID-19 pandemic forced cancellation of the 2020 festival, and was rebranded in 2022 as the Green Film Festival of San Francisco. The first Decibels Music Film Festival took place in fall 2021 at the Roxie and online. Past associated festivals included the Northern California Action Sports Film Festival and the US edition of the International Short Film Festival. A week-long Winter Music Fest was added in 2010, taking place the week before the film festival; starting in 2011, it ran concurrently and the number of music-related films was increased. Ross also started A Mighty Ruckus, a rock festival.

== Film categories ==
The San Francisco Independent Film Festival has separate film entry categories for general entrants and for Bay Area filmmakers. Both have sub-categories for length (features and shorts) and genre (narrative fiction, documentary, and animation).

== Awards ==
The SF IndieFest awards panel confers the following awards:

Jury Prize

- Best Narrative Feature
- Best Documentary Feature
- Best Narrative Short
- Best Documentary Short
- Best Animated Short

Audience Award

- Best Feature Drama
- Best Feature Comedy
- Best Feature Documentary
- Best Short Drama
- Best Short Comedy
- Best Short Documentary
- Best Animated Short
- Best Midnight Movie

Screenplay Competition

- Best Feature Script
- Best Short Script

Vanguard Award

- Recognizing "unconventional, creative risk-taking filmmakers that are redefining the cinematic form"
