= Great Britain at the 1994 Winter Paralympics =

- Flag of the United Kingdom
- IPC code: GBR
- NPC: British Paralympic Association
- Website: www.paralympics.org.uk

in Lillehammer
- Competitors: 23 in 4 sports
- Medals Ranked 21st: Gold 0 Silver 0 Bronze 5 Total 5

Winter Paralympics appearances (overview)
- 1976; 1980; 1984; 1988; 1992; 1994; 1998; 2002; 2006; 2010; 2014; 2018; 2022; 2026

The United Kingdom of Great Britain and Northern Ireland competed at the 1994 Winter Paralympics held in Lillehammer, Norway. The team was known by it shortened name of Great Britain, for identification purposes. Twenty-three athletes, all of whom were men,. competed for Britain. The team won five medals at the Games, all bronze, and finished 21st in the medal table. Richard Burt won two medals in alpine skiing, as he had done in the 1992 Games. In addition to the medal performances the team had seven top ten finishes.

== Medallists ==
The following British athletes won medals at the Games. In total five medals were won, all bronze, and the team finished 21st in the medal table. In the 'by discipline' sections below, medallists' names are in bold.

Medal	Name	Sport	Event
Bronze	James Barker	Alpine skiing	Men's downhill LWXI
Bronze	Richard Burt	Alpine skiing	Men's giant slalom B3
Bronze	Richard Burt	Alpine skiing	Men's super-G B3
Bronze	Matthew Stockford	Alpine skiing	Men's super-G LWX
Bronze	Peter Young	Cross-country skiing	Men's 5 km classical technique B1

== Disability classification ==
Every participant at the Paralympics has their disability grouped into one of five disability categories; amputation, the condition may be congenital or sustained through injury or illness; cerebral palsy; wheelchair athletes, there is often overlap between this and other categories; visual impairment, including blindness; Les autres, any physical disability that does not fall strictly under one of the other categories, for example dwarfism or multiple sclerosis. Each Paralympic sport then has its own classifications, dependent upon the specific physical demands of competition. Events are given a code, made of numbers and letters, describing the type of event and classification of the athletes competing. Events with "B" in the code are for athletes with visual impairment, codes LW1 to LW9 are for athletes who stand to compete and LW10 to LW12 are for athletes who compete sitting down. In biathlon events, which contain a target shooting component, blind and visually impaired athletes are able to compete through the use of acoustic signals, whose signal intensity varies dependent upon whether or not the athlete is on target.

== Alpine skiing ==
Eight British athletes competed in alpine skiing events, a decrease from the eleven who had competed in the 1992 Games. Six of the athletes had previous Games experience. A total of four bronze medals were won by British skiers. Richard Burt medalled in both the giant slalom and super-G B3 classification, as he had done in 1992. Matthew Stockford, who won three bronze medals at the previous Games, took home a bronze in the super-G LXW and James Barker won bronze in the downhill LWXI.

Athlete	Event	Time	Rank
**James Barker**	Downhill LWXI	1:39.12	Bronze medal
**James Barker**	Giant slalom LWXI	Did not finish	
**James Barker**	Slalom LWXI	2:24.38	5
**James Barker**	Super-G LWXI	Did not finish	
**Richard Burt**	Downhill B3	Disqualified	
**Richard Burt**	Giant slalom B3	2:46.79	Bronze medal
**Richard Burt**	Slalom B3	Did not finish	
**Richard Burt**	Super-G B3	1:35.19	Bronze medal
Michael Hammond	Downhill LW2	1:31.27	15
Michael Hammond	Giant slalom LW2	Disqualified	
Michael Hammond	Slalom LW2	Disqualified	
Michael Hammond	Super-G LW2	1:35.84	24
Brian Harding	Downhill LWX	Did not finish	
Brian Harding	Giant slalom LWX	Did not finish	
Brian Harding	Slalom LWX	Did not start	
Brian Harding	Super-G LWX	Did not finish	
Jonathan Morris	Downhill LW2	Did not finish	
Jonathan Morris	Giant slalom LW2	3:08.72	18
Jonathan Morris	Slalom LW2	1:52.02	10
Jonathan Morris	Super-G LW2	1:37.32	25
Graham Nugent	Giant slalom LW1/3	Disqualified	
Graham Nugent	Slalom LW1/3	Did not finish	
Graham Nugent	Super-G LW1/3	2:14.38	7
**Matthew Stockford**	Downhill LWX	Did not finish	
**Matthew Stockford**	Giant slalom LWX	Did not finish	
**Matthew Stockford**	Slalom LWX	Did not start	
**Matthew Stockford**	Super-G LWX	1:48.18	Bronze medal
Edward Suckling	Giant slalom LW1/3	4:38.24	5
Edward Suckling	Slalom LW1/3	Did not finish	
Edward Suckling	Super-G LW1/3	3:07.19	8

== Biathlon ==
Three British men competed in biathlon events, all of them had also represented the nation in the 1992 Winter Paralympics. All of Britain's biathletes raced in the 7.5 kilometres (4.7 mi) B1 classification, for those with no functional vision and in the shooting component were assisted by acoustic signals to indicate when they were on target. None of the athletes won a medal, the highest placed finisher being Peter Young who came eleventh. Young and James Denton also competed in cross-country skiing events at the Games.

Athlete	Event	Real time	Missed shots	Factor (%)	Finish time	Rank
Mike Brace	7.5 km B1	50:47.2	1	80	40:43.8	13
James Denton	7.5 km B1	48:16.2	6	80	39:12.10	12
Peter Young	7.5 km B1	41:34.9	9	80	34:09.9	13

== Cross-country skiing ==
Britain sent two biathletes to the Games, both of whom had also competed in the 1992 Games. James Denton and Peter Young both competed in the 5 kilometres (3.1 mi), 10 kilometres (6.2 mi) and 20 kilometres (12 mi) races in the B1 classification. Young won the bronze medal in the 5 km event. This was his second Paralympic bronze medal, he won his first in the 1984 Games in the 10 km event. Denton's best finish was fourteenth in the 10 km event.

Athlete	Event	Real time	Factor (%)	Finish time	Rank
James Denton	5 km B1	21:24.9	85	18:12.1	16
James Denton	10 km B1	44:24.0	80	35:31.2	14
James Denton	20 km B1	1:23:58.6	85	1:11:22.8	15
**Peter Young**	5 km B1	16:23.2	85	13:55.7	Bronze medal
**Peter Young**	10 km B1	34:38.5	80	27:42.8	11
**Peter Young**	20 km B1	1:03:45.7	85	54:11.8	4

Factor percentage

To ensure a fair event when athletes with differing disabilities compete, times achieved are sometimes modified by a factor percentage, to produce a result known as "Finish Time". It is this time that decides the result of the races. Real times recorded are also listed.

== Ice sledge hockey ==
Ice sledge hockey made its first appearance on the Paralympic schedule in Lillehammer. Great Britain sent a squad of 12 athletes to compete in the sport. Five teams competed in a group stage with the top two teams advancing to the gold medal match and third and fourth placed teams playing off for the bronze medal. The British team beat Estonia 2–0, drew 0–0 with both Canada and Norway and lost 7–0 to Sweden to finish fourth in the group. Facing Canada again for the bronze medal, Britain were defeated 2–0.

Squad list	Group		Bronze medal match	Rank
Squad list	Opposition Result	Rank	Bronze medal match	Rank
Phil Brownstein; Andy Flockton; Dave Hall; Phillip Hall; Stuart Harley; William Henderson; Paul Ireson; John Lambert; William Levick; Anthony Neale; Philip Saunders; Neil Wood	Norway; **D** 0–0	4	Canada; **L** 0–2	4
Phil Brownstein; Andy Flockton; Dave Hall; Phillip Hall; Stuart Harley; William Henderson; Paul Ireson; John Lambert; William Levick; Anthony Neale; Philip Saunders; Neil Wood	Sweden; **L** 0–7	4	Canada; **L** 0–2	4
Phil Brownstein; Andy Flockton; Dave Hall; Phillip Hall; Stuart Harley; William Henderson; Paul Ireson; John Lambert; William Levick; Anthony Neale; Philip Saunders; Neil Wood	Canada; **D** 0–0	4	Canada; **L** 0–2	4
Phil Brownstein; Andy Flockton; Dave Hall; Phillip Hall; Stuart Harley; William Henderson; Paul Ireson; John Lambert; William Levick; Anthony Neale; Philip Saunders; Neil Wood	Estonia; **W** 2–0	4	Canada; **L** 0–2	4

== See also ==
- Great Britain at the Paralympics
- Great Britain at the 1994 Winter Olympics
