= Great Britain at the Paralympics =

- Flag of the United Kingdom
- IPC code: GBR
- NPC: British Paralympic Association
- Website: www.paralympics.org.uk
- Medals Ranked 2nd: Gold 719 Silver 679 Bronze 680 Total 2,078

Summer appearances
- 1960; 1964; 1968; 1972; 1976; 1980; 1984; 1988; 1992; 1996; 2000; 2004; 2008; 2012; 2016; 2020; 2024

Winter appearances
- 1976; 1980; 1984; 1988; 1992; 1994; 1998; 2002; 2006; 2010; 2014; 2018; 2022; 2026

The United Kingdom of Great Britain and Northern Ireland, referred to as simply "Great Britain", has participated in every summer and winter Paralympic Games.

== Birthplace of the Paralympic movement ==
While the Olympic Games find their origins in Olympia in Ancient Greece, it is post-World War II Britain, and specifically the Stoke Mandeville Hospital, that is recognised as the spiritual birthplace and home of the Paralympic movement.

The first official Paralympic Games, held in Rome in 1960, were simultaneously the 9th International Stoke Mandeville Wheelchair Games, an annual competition first devised by Dr Ludwig Guttmann in 1948 to coincide with the London Olympic Games of 1948, for soldiers with spinal cord injuries being cared for in Stoke Mandeville Hospital, and which first became an international event in 1952, when Dutch veterans requested an opportunity to compete; a delighted Dr Guttman immediately renamed the 1952 event, which once again coincided with the Summer Olympic Games, as the 1st International Stoke Mandeville Wheelchair Games. The 9th International Games in 1960 were held in Rome to once more emphasise the relationship with its sister Olympic movement, and were designated retrospectively the first Paralympic Games.

While the International Stoke Mandeville Games continue to exist, renamed as the IWAS World Games, as specific event for wheelchair and amputee athletes, the Paralympic Games evolved from its Stoke Mandeville Games roots to include a far more comprehensive range of disabilities.

Dr. Guttmann's stature in the history and lore of the Paralympic movement is therefore broadly analogous to that of Baron Pierre de Coubertin in the birth of the Olympic Games, and Great Britain's role is comparable to the role of Greece in the Olympic movement. This legacy was commemorated before each Paralympic Games since 2012 with the lighting of a 'legacy flame' at Stoke Mandeville as part of the Paralympic torch event. Whereas the Olympic flame is lit from the refracted rays of the sun, the Paralympic flame is lit by the kinetic effort of a Paralympian, to represent human movement, from which the Paralympic logo, the agitos, also derives its name. The first such athlete in 2012 was British paralympic champion Hannah Cockroft. From 2024 onwards every Paralympic flame will first be lit in Stoke Mandeville Hospital in a deliberate echo of the similar ceremonies that take place before each modern Olympic Games at Olympia.

The President of the IPC, Andrew Parsons compared the role of Great Britain and Stoke Mandeville in the Paralympic movement to the role of Greece and Olympia in the Olympic movement in 2024: “For everyone involved in the Paralympic Movement, Stoke Mandeville represents sacred and cherished ground...It is here 76 years ago that the visionary pioneer Sir Ludwig Guttmann created the Paralympic Movement.”

== Historical performance in Paralympic Games ==
Great Britain has performed particularly well at the Summer Paralympic Games, consistently finishing among the top five in the medal tables - a marginally better performance than that achieved by Great Britain at the Olympics until the 21st century - reflecting the country's sustained connection to, and continuing deep support for, the Games. Britain has won three gold medals at the Winter Paralympics and 626 at the Summer Games. Combining these results, the British team is positioned in second place on the all-time Paralympic Games medal table.

Great Britain was the host of the first Stoke Mandeville Games to coincide with London's hosting of the 1948 Summer Olympics. These Games are the direct precursor and inspiration of the Paralympic Games, but are not treated as an edition of those Games. Great Britain was, however, one of the co-host countries of the 1984 Summer Paralympics in Stoke Mandeville, sharing the duties with New York to coincide with the United States hosting the 1984 Summer Olympics in Los Angeles, and the sole host, for the first time, of the 2012 Summer Paralympics, in London. The 2012 Games reflected the links between Britain, the Olympics and Paralympics in several ways, with the mascots for both Games, Wenlock and Mandeville, taking their names from the Much Wenlock Olympian Games and Stoke Mandeville Games, recognised precursors of respectively the Olympic and Paralympic Games in Great Britain. The Paralympics were very strongly supported by the British public, and the British broadcast and print media, and the press in Great Britain continue to give significant coverage to the event, and to paralympic sport in other formats, such as para-sport in the Commonwealth Games and European Para Championships.

== Paralympics GB and naming conventions ==
Although the country uses the name "Great Britain", athletes from Northern Ireland are entitled to compete as part of British delegations on the same terms as at the Olympic Games. Representatives of the devolved Northern Ireland government, however, have objected to the name, which they argue creates a perception that Northern Ireland is not part of the British Olympic team, and have called for the team to be renamed as Team UK. The team is branded and promoted as Paralympics GB, though is sometimes informally and incorrectly referred to as Team GB, which is a brand specific to the teams of the British Olympic Association.

Under the terms of a long-standing settlement between the British Paralympic Association and the Paralympics Ireland, athletes from Northern Ireland can elect to represent Ireland at the Paralympics, as Northern Irish people are legally entitled, as of birthright, to dual citizenship. Some athletes have represented both nations, and Bethany Firth, a paralympic swimmer from Northern Ireland, has won gold medals for both nations in the same event in back-to-back Games.

== Notable British paralympians ==
Great Britain's most successful Paralympian is swimmer turned cyclist Sarah Storey, who took the honour at the 2020 Summer Paralympics when she won her 16th gold medal, and 27th medal in all. Storey retired in 2026 from elite sport to take up a campaigning role for Paralympicism, having won by that point 19 Paralympic gold medals.

Prior to 2020, the record had been held for decades by swimmer Mike Kenny who also won 16 individual gold medals, as well as two relay silvers, in four Games. Although Great Britain has competed in every Games, the British Paralympic Committee was only founded in 1989, after Kenny's retirement. Media in Britain consistently referred to the most decorated Paralympic athletes from that year, Tanni Grey-Thompson, Dave Roberts and Sarah Storey as Britain's "greatest Paralympians", occasionally with the phrase "of the modern era", attached to differentiate from the pre-BPC events. The International Paralympic Committee, however, recognise all of Kenny's eighteen medals as Paralympic medals, and he remains Great Britain's most successful male Paralympian and the most successful British Paralympian in a single sport (Of her 19 gold medals, Storey won 14 in cycling and 5 in swimming).

Great Britain's first Paralympic gold was earned at the 1960 Rome Games by Margaret Maughan. Her feat was recognised when Maughan was chosen to light the Paralympic Flame during the Opening Ceremony of the 2012 Summer Paralympics.

Great Britain's first Winter Paralympic gold was earned at the Sochi 2014 Games by Kelly Gallagher and guide Charlotte Evans in the Women's super-G visually impaired.

Multiple athletes have won 4 medals at the Winter Paralympics for Great Britain, each in alpine skiing for blind or visually impaired athletes. Most recently by Menna Fitzpatrick and her guide Jennifer Kehoe in 2018, Jade Etherington and guide Caroline Powell in 2014. Richard Burt won 4 medals across two games in 1992 and 1994. However, Fitzpatrick and her guide Kehoe are the only athletes from this group to have won a gold medal. The only other British athletes to have won a gold medal at the Winter Paralympics are Kelly Gallagher and her guide Charlotte Evans, also in alpine skiing in 2014 and Neil Simpson and his guide and brother, Andrew in 2022, also in Alpine skiing.

== Hosted Games ==
In 2012, Great Britain became the second nation, the other being the United States, to have hosted the Summer Paralympic Games twice.

Games	Host city	Dates	Nations	Participants	Events
1984 Summer Paralympics	Stoke Mandeville	22 July – 1 August	41	1100	603
2012 Summer Paralympics	London	29 August – 9 September	164	4302	503

== Medal tables ==
*Red border colour indicates tournament was held on home soil.

=== Medals by Summer Games ===
Games	Athletes	Gold	Silver	Bronze	Total	Rank
(Italy) 1960 Rome	53	20	15	20	55	2
(Japan) 1964 Tokyo	39	18	23	20	61	2
(Israel) 1968 Tel Aviv	75	29	20	20	69	2
(Germany) 1972 Heidelberg	72	16	15	21	52	3
(Canada) 1976 Toronto	87	29	28	37	94	5
(Netherlands) 1980 Arnhem	96	47	32	21	100	5
(United Kingdom) (United States) 1984 Stoke Mandeville/New York	227	107	112	112	331	2
(South Korea) 1988 Seoul	231	65	65	54	184	3
(Spain) 1992 Barcelona/Madrid	209	42	51	45	138	3
(United States) 1996 Atlanta	248	39	42	41	122	4
(Australia) 2000 Sydney	215	41	43	47	131	2
(Greece) 2004 Athens	167	35	30	29	94	2
(China) 2008 Beijing	212	42	29	31	102	2
(United Kingdom) 2012 London	288	34	43	43	120	3
(Brazil) 2016 Rio de Janeiro	265	64	39	44	147	2
(Japan) 2020 Tokyo	227	41	38	45	124	2
(France) 2024 Paris	215	49	44	31	124	2
(United States) 2028 Los Angeles	future event					
(Australia) 2032 Brisbane	future event					
Total		718	669	661	2048	2

=== Medals by Winter Games ===
Games	Athletes	Gold	Silver	Bronze	Total	Rank
(Sweden) 1976 Örnsköldsvik	6	0	0	0	0	–
(Norway) 1980 Geilo	8	0	0	0	0	–
(Austria) 1984 Innsbruck	22	0	4	6	10	12
(Austria) 1988 Innsbruck	24	0	0	0	0	–
(France) 1992 Tignes-Albertville	15	0	1	4	5	15
(Norway) 1994 Lillehammer	23	0	0	5	5	21
(Japan) 1998 Nagano	21	0	0	0	0	–
(United States) 2002 Salt Lake City	2	0	0	0	0	–
(Italy) 2006 Turin	20	0	1	0	1	17
(Canada) 2010 Vancouver	12	0	0	0	0	–
(Russia) 2014 Sochi	15	1	3	2	6	10
(South Korea) 2018 PyeongChang	17	1	4	2	7	13
(China) 2022 Beijing	24	1	1	4	6	14
(Italy) 2026 Milano Cortina	19	0	1	0	1	21
(France) 2030 French Alps	Future event					
(United States) 2034 Utah	Future event					
Total		3	15	23	41	26

Great Britain has never topped the medal table at the Paralympic Games. Conversely, it has never finished lower than fifth, and has only finished below second once this century, when it finished third in its home games of 2012. In all, Great Britain have finished second on the table ten times, and third a further four. In doing so, Great Britain has remained consistently near the top of the table, while the fortunes of other giants such as the United States, China and Russia have risen and fallen.

In 1984 Great Britain won its greatest number of medals, 331, and gold medals, 107, at a single Games. Since those Games, the Paralympic schedule has been significantly updated and streamlined by the International Paralympic Committee, with around 40% fewer events contested, and greater numbers of countries seriously contesting those events that remain. As such, the 1984 totals are unlikely ever to be threatened. Despite this, in recent Games, Great Britain have consistently won more than one hundred medals every Games except 2004 in Athens (and even there won 94), and have won thirty gold medals in every summer Games since the 1976 Games in Toronto.

=== Medals by Summer Sport ===
Leading in that sport

Sport	Gold	Silver	Bronze	Total
Swimming	243	265	236	744
Athletics	221	182	192	595
Cycling	59	38	21	118
Lawn bowls	35	28	19	82
Equestrian	34	21	16	71
Table tennis	26	33	50	109
Archery	19	22	23	64
Fencing	13	15	27	55
Rowing	11	1	2	14
Canoe	10	5	5	20
Shooting	8	9	12	29
Snooker	8	4	6	18
Boccia	6	5	3	14
Wheelchair tennis	4	9	6	19
Powerlifting	4	6	10	20
Weightlifting	4	6	5	15
Judo	4	5	10	19
Triathlon	4	4	4	12
Taekwondo	2	1	1	4
Dartchery	1	1	1	3
Sailing	1	0	3	4
Wheelchair rugby	1	0	0	1
Wheelchair basketball	0	4	6	10
Badminton	0	3	1	4
Volleyball	0	1	0	1
Football 7-a-side	0	0	3	3
Totals (26 entries)	718	668	662	2,048

(Last updated: 15 January 2025)

=== Medals by Winter Sport ===
Leading in that sport

Sport	Gold	Silver	Bronze	Total
Alpine skiing	3	10	15	28
Ice sledge racing	0	4	4	8
Wheelchair curling	0	1	1	2
Cross-country skiing	0	0	2	2
Snowboard	0	0	1	1
Totals (5 entries)	3	15	23	41

(Last updated: 18 July 2026)

Best results in non-medalling sports:

Summer
Sport	Rank	Athlete	Event & Year
Basketball ID	–	–	–
Blind football	5th	Great Britain men's team	Men's tournament in 2008
Goalball	5th	Great Britain women's team	Women's tournament in 2000
Wrestling	–	–	–
Winter
Sport	Rank	Athlete	Event & Year
Biathlon	4th	Peter Young	Men's 7.5 km free B1 in 1998
Ice hockey	4th	Great Britain mixed team	Mixed tournament in 1994

== Multi medallists ==
Athletes in bold are still active

=== Summer Paralympics ===
==== Summer Paralympic multi medallists ====
Athletes who have won at least three gold medals or five medals. Ordered categorically by gold (then silver then bronze) medals earned, sports then year.

No.	Athlete	Sport(s)	Years	Gender	Gold	Silver	Bronze	Total
1	**Sarah Storey**	Swimming; Cycling	1992 – 2024	F	19	8	3	30
2	Mike Kenny	Swimming	1976 – 1988	M	16	2	0	18
3	**Lee Pearson**	Equestrian	2000 - 2020	M	14	2	1	17
4	Tanni Grey-Thompson	Athletics	1988 – 2000	F	11	4	1	16
4	David Roberts	Swimming	2000 – 2008	M	11	4	1	16
6	Isabel Newstead	Athletics; Shooting; Swimming	1984–2004	F	10	4	4	18
7	Carol Bryant	Athletics; Table tennis Swimming; Fencing	1964–1976, 1988	F	10	2	5	17
8	Chris Holmes	Swimming	1988–2000	M	9	5	1	15
9	**Jody Cundy**	Swimming; Cycling	1996–2024	M	9	3	1	13
10	Robin Surgeoner	Swimming	1984–1988	M	9	0	0	9
10	**Hannah Cockroft**	Athletics	2012–2024	F	9	0	0	9
12	Robert Matthews	Athletics	1984–2004	M	8	4	1	13
13	**Sophie Christiansen**	Equestrian	2004–2016	F	8	1	1	10
14	James Anderson	Swimming	1992–2012	M	6	9	2	17
15	Valerie Robertson	Archery; Athletics; Swimming; Fencing	1964–1976	F	6	4	2	12
16	Dick Thompson	Athletics; Wheelchair basketball	1960–1968	M	6	3	6	15
17	Darren Kenny	Cycling	2004–2012	M	6	3	1	10
18	David Weir	Athletics	2004–2016	M	6	2	2	10
18	**Natasha Baker**	Equestrian	2012–2024	F	6	2	2	10
20	Janice Burton	Swimming	1984–1996	F	5	10	5	20
21	James Muirhead	Swimming	1976–1984	M	5	5	3	13
22	Noel Thatcher	Athletics	1984–2004	M	5	4	2	11
23	**Bethany Firth**	Swimming	2016-2024	F	5	3	0	8
23	Barbara Anderson	Archery; Swimming; Table tennis	1960–1972	F	5	2	0	7
23	David Ellis	Swimming	1964–1972	M	5	2	0	7
25	Ellie Simmonds	Swimming	2008–2016	F	5	1	2	8
26	Anne Dunham	Equestrian	1996–2008	F	5	1	1	7
26	**Kadeena Cox**	Athletics; Cycling	2016–2024	F	5	1	1	7
28	Colin Keay	Athletics	1984–1988	M	5	1	0	6
29	Michael Walker	Athletics	1988–1992	M	5	0	0	5
30	**Sophie Wells**	Equestrian	2012-2024	F	4	4	2	10
31	Margaret Maughan	Archery; Dartchery; Lawn bowls Swimming	1960–1980	F	4	2	0	6
31	Deborah Criddle	Equestrian	2004–2012	F	4	2	0	6
33	Caroline Innes	Athletics	1992–2000	F	4	1	0	5
34	**Jaco Van Gass**	Cycling	2020-2024	M	4	0	1	5
34	**Maisie Summers-Newton**	Swimming	2020-2024	F	4	0	1	5
36	James Crisp	Swimming	2000–2012	M	3	6	3	12
37	Margaret McEleny	Swimming	1992–2004	F	3	5	7	15
38	Jeanette Chippington	Swimming; Canoe	1988–2004, 2016-2020	F	3	4	7	14
39	Nigel Coultas	Athletics	1988–1992	M	3	4	0	7
40	Stephen Payton	Athletics	1996–2008	M	3	2	4	9
41	Giles Long	Swimming	1996–2004	M	3	2	2	7
42	**Poppy Maskill**	Swimming	2024	F	3	2	0	5
43	**Alice Tai**	Swimming	2016, 2024	F	3	1	3	7
44	**Charlotte Henshaw**	Swimming; Canoe	2012-2024	F	3	1	1	5
44	**Reece Dunn**	Swimming	2020	M	3	1	1	5
46	Nicola Tustain	Equestrian	2000–2004	F	3	0	3	6
47	Kenny Churchill	Athletics	1992–2008	M	3	0	2	5
48	Peter Hull	Swimming	1988–1992	M	3	0	0	3
48	**Lauren Rowles**	Rowing	2016-2024	F	3	0	0	3
50	Martin Mansell	Swimming	1984–1988	M	2	5	1	8
51	Dimitri Coutya	Fencing	2020-2024	M	2	2	4	8
52	**Jessica-Jane Applegate**	Swimming	2012-2020	F	2	2	3	7
53	**Sophie Unwin**	Cycling	2020-2024	F	2	2	2	6
54	**Jonnie Peacock**	Athletics	2012-2024	M	2	2	1	5
54	**Stephen Bate**	Cycling	2016-2024	M	2	2	1	5
56	**Lora Fachie**	Cycling	2016-2024	F	2	1	4	7
57	**Stephen Clegg**	Swimming	2020-2024	M	2	1	2	5
58	**Piers Gilliver**	Fencing	2020-2024	M	1	5	2	8
59	**Claire Cashmore**	Swimming; Triathlon	2008-2024	F	1	4	5	10
60	**Samantha Kinghorn**	Athletics	2020-2024	F	1	4	1	6
61	Clare Cunningham	Swimming; Triathlon	1992–1996, 2016	F	1	4	0	5
61	**Will Bayley**	Table tennis	2012-2024	M	1	4	0	5
63	**Karé Adenegan**	Athletics	2016–2024	F	0	5	2	7
64	**Crystal Lane**	Cycling	2016-2020	F	0	4	1	5
65	**Terry Bywater**	Wheelchair basketball	2000-2024	M	0	1	4	5

==== Multi medals at single Games ====
This is a list of British athletes who have won at least two gold medals in a single Games. Ordered categorically by gold (then silver then bronze) medals earned, sports then year.

No.	Athlete	Sport	Year	Gender	Gold	Silver	Bronze	Total
1	Mike Kenny	Swimming	1984	M	5	1	0	12
1	Mike Kenny	Swimming	1988	M	5	1	0	12
3	Pauline Foulds	Swimming	1960	F	5	0	0	5
3	Robin Surgeoner	Swimming	1984	M	5	0	0	5
5	Dick Thompson	Athletics	1960	M	4	0	1	7
5	Dick Thompson	Wheelchair basketball	1960	M	0	1	1	7
6	Darren Kenny	Cycling	2008	M	4	1	0	5
7	**Maisie Summers-Newton**	Swimming	2024	F	2	0	1	5
7	**Maisie Summers-Newton**	Swimming	2020	F	2	0	0	5
8	Michael Walker	Athletics	1988	M	4	0	0	4
8	Barbara Anderson	Swimming	1960	F	3	0	0	4
8	Barbara Anderson	Table tennis	1960	F	1	0	0	4
10	Janice Burton	Swimming	1992	F	3	4	0	7
11	James Crisp	Swimming	2000	M	3	2	2	7
12	Sarah Bailey	Swimming	1996	F	3	1	1	5
13	Nigel Coultas	Athletics	1988	M	3	1	0	4
13	**Bethany Firth**	Swimming	2016	F	3	1	0	4
15	Stephen Payton	Athletics	1996	M	3	0	1	4
16	Colin Keay	Athletics	1984	M	3	0	0	3
16	Peter Hull	Swimming	1992	M	3	0	0	3
18	Joanne Rout	Swimming	1988	F	2	3	0	5
19	Jeanette Chippington	Swimming	1996	F	2	1	2	5
20	**Kadeena Cox**	Athletics	2016	F	1	1	1	4
20	**Kadeena Cox**	Cycling	2016	F	1	0	0	4
20	**Ellie Simmonds**	Swimming	2012	F	2	1	1	4
22	Thelma Young	Swimming	1988	F	2	0	2	4
23	Nicola Tustain	Equestrian	2000	F	2	0	1	3

==== Multi medals at a single event ====
This is a list of British athletes who have won at least two gold medals in a single event at the Summer Paralympics. Ordered categorically by gold (then silver then bronze) medals earned, sports then year.

No.	Athlete	Sport	Event	Years	Games	Gender	Gold	Silver	Bronze	Total
1	Sascha Kindred	Swimming	Men's 200m ind. medley	1996-2016	6	M	4	1	0	5
2	Tommy Taylor	Table tennis	Men's doubles	1960-1980	6	M	4	0	1	5
3	Anne Dunham	Equestrian	Team open	1996-2008	4	F	4	0	0	4
4	**Maisie Summers-Newton**	Swimming	200 m ind. medley SM6	2020-2024	2	F	2	0	0	4
4	**Maisie Summers-Newton**	Swimming	100 m breaststroke SB6	202-2024	2	F	2	0	0	4
5	**Stephen Miller**	Athletics	Men's club throw F32/51	1996-2016	6	M	3	1	2	6
6	Kenny Churchill	Athletics	Men's javelin throw F36	1992-2004	4	M	3	0	1	4
7	Caroline Innes	Athletics	Women's 100m T36	1992-2000	3	F	2	1	0	3
8	Emma Brown	Powerlifting	Women's -82 kg	2000-2004	2	F	2	0	0	2
9	Bethany Firth	Swimming	Women's 100m backstroke S14	2016-2020	2	F	2	0	0	0

==== Most successful Paralympian in a sport ====
This is a list of British athletes who are the most successful Para-athletes in their sport at the Summer Paralympics. Ordered categorically by medals earned, sports then gold medals earned.

Athlete	Sport	Years	Gender	Gold	Silver	Bronze	Total
Lee Pearson	Equestrian	2000-2020	M	14	2	1	17
Sarah Storey	Cycling	1996-2024	F	14	0	0	9
Michael Shelton	Snooker	1960-1976	M	3	1	1	5
James Fox; Pamela Relph; Laurence Whiteley; Lauren Rowles	Rowing	2012-2020		2	0	0	2

==== Most appearances ====
This is a list of British athletes who have competed in four or more Summer Paralympics. Active athletes are in bold. Athletes who were aged under 15 years of age and over 40 years of age are in bold.

No.	Athlete	Sport(s)	Birth Year	Games Years	First/Last Age	Gender	Gold	Silver	Bronze	Total
1	Deanna Coates	Shooting	1954	1984 - 2012 (8)	30 - **58**	F	3	3	2	8
1	**Sarah Storey**	Cycling; Swimming	1973	1992 - 2024 (9)	15 - **46**	F	19	8	3	26
2	Isabel Newstead	Athletics; Shooting; Swimming	1955	1980 - 2004 (7)	25 - **49**	F	10	4	4	18
2	James Rawson	Table tennis	1965	1984 - 2008 (7)	19 - **43**	M	5	1	2	8
2	Anthony Peddle	Powerlifting	1971	1988 - 2012 (7)	17 - **41**	M	1	0	2	3
5	Robert Matthews	Athletics	1961	1984 - 2004 (6)	23 - **51**	M	8	4	1	13
5	Jane Stidever	Swimming	1966	1984 - 2004 (6)	18 - 38	F	5	5	5	15
5	James Anderson	Swimming	1963	1992 - 2012 (6)	29 - **49**	M	6	9	2	17
5	**Jody Cundy**	Cycling; Swimming	1978	1996 - 2016 (6)	18 - 38	M	7	0	3	10
5	**Stephen Miller**	Athletics	1980	1996 - 2016 (6)	16 - 36	M	3	1	2	6
10	Christopher Holmes	Swimming	1971	1988 - 2000 (4)	17 - 29	M	9	5	1	15
10	Stephen Brunt	Athletics	1960	1988 - 2000 (4)	18 - **40**	M	2	1	0	3

=== Winter Paralympics ===
No.	Athlete	Sport(s)	Years	Gender	Gold	Silver	Bronze	Total
1	**Menna Fitzpatrick**; Guide: **Jennifer Kehoe**	Alpine skiing	2018-2022	F	1	3	2	6
2	**Kelly Gallagher**; Guide: **Charlotte Evans**	Alpine skiing	2010–2014	F	1	0	0	**1**
3	Jade Etherington; Guide: Caroline Powell	Alpine skiing	2014	F	0	3	1	**4**
4	Denise Smith	Ice sledge speed racing	1984	F	0	3	0	**3**
5	Richard Burt	Alpine skiing	1992–1994	M	0	1	3	**4**

== See also ==
- Great Britain at the Olympics
