= Great Britain at the 1992 Winter Paralympics =

- Flag of the United Kingdom
- IPC code: GBR
- NPC: British Paralympic Association
- Website: www.paralympics.org.uk

in Tignes-Albertville
- Competitors: 15 in 3 sports
- Medals Ranked 15th: Gold 0 Silver 1 Bronze 4 Total 5

Winter Paralympics appearances (overview)
- 1976; 1980; 1984; 1988; 1992; 1994; 1998; 2002; 2006; 2010; 2014; 2018; 2022; 2026

The United Kingdom of Great Britain and Northern Ireland competed at the 1992 Winter Paralympics held in Tignes and Albertville, France. The team was known by it shortened name of Great Britain, for identification purposes.

The British team entered athletes in all three disciplines contested at the Games; eleven in alpine skiing, four in biathlon and three in cross-country skiing. Five medals were won by British athletes, one silver and four bronze, meaning Britain placed fifteenth in the medal table. All five medals were won in alpine skiing events, two by Richard Burt and three by Matthew Stockford. In addition to the medal performances the team had fourteen top ten finishes. The achievements of the British Paralympic team at the 1992 Winter Games helped to raise awareness of sports for disabled athletes.

== Medallists ==
The following British athletes won medals at the Games. In total five medals were won, all in alpine skiing, and the team finished fifteenth in the medal table. This was the best medal total by Great Britain at a Winter Paralympics since 1984 in Innsbruck. In the 'by discipline' sections below, medallists' names are in bold.

Medal	Name	Sport	Event
Silver	Richard Burt	Alpine skiing	Men's giant slalom B3
Bronze	Richard Burt	Alpine skiing	Men's super-G B3
Bronze	Matthew Stockford	Alpine skiing	Men's giant slalom LW10
Bronze	Matthew Stockford	Alpine skiing	Men's super-G LW10
Bronze	Matthew Stockford	Alpine skiing	Men's downhill LW10

== Team selection and funding ==
The team was made up of athletes from the whole United Kingdom; athletes from Northern Ireland, who could later elect to hold Irish citizenship under the pre-1999 article 2 of the Irish constitution, were only eligible to represent Great Britain at this time. However no Northern Irish athletes took part in the Winter Paralympics until 2010 in Vancouver.

These were the first Games, along with the Summer Games in Barcelona, to be coordinated by the British Paralympic Association. Funding for elite training programmes came from the Paralympics Trust, which was set up with a £500,000 government grant.

== Disability classification ==
Every participant at the Paralympics has their disability grouped into one of five disability categories; amputation, the condition may be congenital or sustained through injury or illness; cerebral palsy; wheelchair athletes, there is often overlap between this and other categories; visual impairment, including blindness; Les autres, any physical disability that does not fall strictly under one of the other categories, for example dwarfism or multiple sclerosis. Each Paralympic sport then has its own classifications, dependent upon the specific physical demands of competition. Events are given a code, made of numbers and letters, describing the type of event and classification of the athletes competing. Events with "B" in the code are for athletes with visual impairment, codes LW1 to LW9 are for athletes who stand to compete and LW10 to LW12 are for athletes who compete sitting down. In biathlon events, which contain a target shooting component, blind and visually impaired athletes are able to compete through the use of acoustic signals, whose signal intensity varies dependent upon whether or not the athlete is on target.

== Alpine skiing ==
Eleven British alpine skiers took part in the Games, ten in the men's events and one in the women's. All five of Britain's medals at the Games were won in alpine skiing events. The team's only silver medal was won by Richard Burt in the giant slalom B3 classification and he also won a bronze in the super-G B3. Burt almost missed his silver medal run when race officials started prematurely resetting the slalom course, but Burt's sighted guide Keith Hockley noticed and took him up the mountain to complete the race. Matthew Stockford, the reigning world champion in downhill, won three bronze medals in the downhill, super-G and giant slalom events of the LW10 classification. After Stockford won the bronze in downhill, the British delegation filed a protest claiming that the two American skiers ahead of him should not have been in the LW10 category. The medical committee rejected the protest on the grounds that all classifications had been determined at the start of the competition. Both Burt and Stockford would go on to win medals at the 1994 Winter Paralympics in Lillehammer.

Men

Athlete	Event	Time	Rank
Chris Bee	Downhill LW6/8	1:22.18	14
Chris Bee	Giant slalom LW6/8	2:56.54	9
Chris Bee	Slalom LW6/8	2:28.15	13
Phillip Brownstein	Downhill LW11	1:32.47	8
Phillip Brownstein	Giant slalom LW11	3:24.20	7
Phillip Brownstein	Super-G LW11	2:10.17	8
Phillip Brownstein	Slalom LW11	1:49.88	10
**Richard Burt**	Giant slalom B3	2:41.06	Silver medal
**Richard Burt**	Super-G B3	1:38.16	Bronze medal
Chris Clarke	Giant slalom LW2	3:17.43	18
Mark Golay	Downhill LW11	1:36.36	9
Mark Golay	Giant slalom LW11	Did not finish	
Mark Golay	Super-G LW11	2:28.74	12
Michael Hammond	Downhill LW2	1:22.56	15
Michael Hammond	Giant slalom LW2	2:55.24	14
Michael Hammond	Slalom LW2	1:26.15	9
Brian Harding	Downhill LW10	Did not finish	
Brian Harding	Giant slalom LW10	Did not finish	
Brian Harding	Super-G LW10	2:00.95	5
Jonathan Morris	Downhill LW2	1:27.34	21
Jonathan Morris	Giant slalom LW2	1:58.12	19
Graham Nugent	Giant slalom LW1,3,5/7,9	Did not finish	
Graham Nugent	Slalom LW1,3,5/7,9	3:43.24	15
**Matthew Stockford**	Downhill LW10	1:32.46	Bronze medal
**Matthew Stockford**	Giant slalom LW10	3:10.70	Bronze medal
**Matthew Stockford**	Super-G LW10	1:48.19	Bronze medal
**Matthew Stockford**	Slalom LW10	2:13.61	4

Women

Athlete	Event	Time	Rank
Christine Blackmore	Downhill LW10-11	1:53.08	5
Christine Blackmore	Giant slalom LW10-11	Did not finish	
Christine Blackmore	Super-G LW10-11	2:32.09	4
Christine Blackmore	Slalom LW10-11	2:31.00	5

== Biathlon ==
Four British men competed in biathlon events, all of them in the visually impaired classifications. None of the athletes won a medal, the highest placed finisher being Peter Young who came sixth in the B1 7.5 kilometres (4.7 mi). Young, James Brown and James Denton also competed in cross-country skiing events at the Games.

Men

Athlete	Event	Time	Rank
Mike Brace	7.5 km B1	37:16.5	10
James Brown	7.5 km B2-3	27:16.5	13
James Denton	7.5 km B2-3	30:49.7	17
Peter Young	7.5 km B1	29:17.2	6

== Cross-country skiing ==
Three British men took part in cross-country skiing at the 1992 Games; all three also competed in biathlon events. Each athlete entered both the 10 kilometres (6.2 mi) and 30 kilometres (19 mi) for their classification and all three teamed up for the B1-3 3×5 kilometres (3.1 mi) relay, in which the team finished last out of the five competing nations. Peter Young achieved the best finish in an individual event, sixth place in the 10 km B1, he had previously won a bronze medal in the event at the 1984 Innsbruck Games. Both Brown and Denton failed to place in the top ten in their individual events.

Men

Athlete	Event	Time	Rank
James Brown	10 km B3	36:57.7	14
James Brown	30 km B3	1:52:48.1	15
James Denton	10 km B2	42:44.3	16
James Denton	30 km B2	2:02:50.1	16
Peter Young	10 km B1	37:58.3	6
Peter Young	30 km B1	1:47:39.7	7
James Brown, James Denton, Peter Young	3x5 km relay B1-3	58:56.4	5

== See also ==
- Great Britain at the Paralympics
- Great Britain at the 1992 Winter Olympics
