= Great Britain at the 1976 Winter Paralympics =

- Flag of the United Kingdom
- IPC code: GBR
- NPC: British Paralympic Association
- Website: www.paralympics.org.uk

in Örnsköldsvik
- Competitors: 6 in 2 sports
- Medals Ranked =10th: Gold 0 Silver 0 Bronze 0 Total 0

Winter Paralympics appearances (overview)
- 1976; 1980; 1984; 1988; 1992; 1994; 1998; 2002; 2006; 2010; 2014; 2018; 2022; 2026

The United Kingdom of Great Britain and Northern Ireland competed at the inaugural Winter Paralympic Games in 1976 in Örnsköldsvik, Sweden. The team was known by it shortened name of Great Britain, for identification purposes. The team was made up of athletes from the whole United Kingdom; athletes from Northern Ireland, who could later elect to hold Irish citizenship under the pre-1999 article 2 of the Irish constitution, were only eligible to represent Great Britain at this time. However no Northern Irish athletes took part in the Winter Paralympics until 2010 in Vancouver. Events were held for amputees and visually impaired athletes.

Britain entered six athletes, all of them men. The team was represented in both sports at the Games with five participants in cross-country skiing and one in alpine skiing. They did not win any medals.

== Alpine skiing ==
Britain was represented in alpine skiing by a single athlete, Michael Hammond, who competed in the men's giant slalom (category II), finishing twelfth and last with a real time of 354.59, and in the men's slalom (category II), finishing sixteenth and last with a real time of 221.28.

== Cross-country skiing ==
Britain’s cross-country skiing team consisted in Mike Brace, Devec Howie, John Howie, Graham Salmon and Peter Young.

== See also ==
- Great Britain at the 1976 Winter Olympics
