= Great Britain at the 1998 Winter Paralympics =

- Flag of the United Kingdom
- IPC code: GBR
- NPC: British Paralympic Association
- Website: www.paralympics.org.uk

in Nagano
- Competitors: 21 in 4 sports
- Medals: Gold 0 Silver 0 Bronze 0 Total 0

Winter Paralympics appearances (overview)
- 1976; 1980; 1984; 1988; 1992; 1994; 1998; 2002; 2006; 2010; 2014; 2018; 2022; 2026

The United Kingdom of Great Britain and Northern Ireland competed at the 1998 Winter Paralympics held in Nagano, Japan. The team was known by it shortened name of Great Britain, for identification purposes. The team did not win any medals during these games.

== Alpine skiing ==
Britain had 4 athletes competing in alpine skiing events.

=== Men ===
Athlete	Event	Time	Factor (%)	Calculated time	Rank
Richard Burt	Downhill B1,3	1:29.1	85.41391	1:16.1	5
Richard Burt	Giant slalom B1,3				
Richard Burt	Slalom B1,3	2:38.6	80.83597	2:08.2	5
Richard Burt	Super-G B1,3	1:32.7	87.64001	1:21.3	7
Michael Hammond	Downhill LW2	1:18.67	94.14504	1:14.06	18
Michael Hammond	Giant slalom LW2	3:16.19	91.65723	2:59.82	17
Michael Hammond	Slalom LW2	2:13.73	100	2:13.73	16
Michael Hammond	Super-G LW2	1:28.37	91.51208	1:20.86	13
Steven Shaw	Downhill LW11	1:29.82	80.55899	1:12.35	16
Steven Shaw	Giant slalom LW11	DNF			
Steven Shaw	Slalom LW2	DNF			
Steven Shaw	Super-G LW2	1:45.65	82.10537	1:26.74	16

=== Women ===
Athlete	Event	Time	Factor (%)	Calculated time	Rank
Sarah Morris	Giant slalom LW10-11	DNF			
Sarah Morris	Slalom LW10-11	DSQ			
Sarah Morris	Super-G B1,3	DNF			

== Biathlon ==
Britain had 2 athletes competing in the biathlon events.

=== Men ===
Athlete	Event	Real time	Missed shots	Factor (%)	Finish time	Rank
Terry Ahrens	7.5 km free LW6/8	37:08.2	0	95	35:16.7	14
Peter Young	7.5 km free B1	39:26.6	4	83	33:25.0	4

== Cross-country skiing ==
Britain had 2 athletes competing in the cross-country skiing events.

=== Men ===
Athlete	Event	Time	Factor (%)	Calculated time	Rank
Terry Ahrens	15 km free LW5/7,6/8	37:23.4	95	35:31.2	19
Terry Ahrens	5 km classical LW5/7,6/8	21:06.2	92	19:24.9	22
Peter Young	15 km free B1	42:50.3	83	35:33.3	8
Peter Young	20 km classical B1-3	1:15:38.2	87	1:05:48.2	12
Peter Young	5 km classical B1	18:06.8	87	15:45.5	4

== Ice sledge hockey ==
Britain entered with a squad of 15 players for the men's ice sledge hockey competition. There was no female event. The team finished in last place and scored no goals, but managed to pick up one point in a draw against 5th placed Japan.

=== Squad ===
- Matthew Broadbent
- Patrick Bailey
- Philip Hall
- Stephen Shortland
- Stuart Harley
- Timothy James
- Llyr Gwyndaf
- Karl Nicholson
- John Lambert
- Antony Booth
- Antony Neale
- Dave Hall
- Dean Cavanagh
- Gary Vaughan
- Ian Warner

Andrew white

=== Preliminary round ===
==== Round robin ====
Great Britain 0 – 7 Sweden
Great Britain 0 – 6 Estonia

==== Standings ====
Rank	Team	GP	W	D	L	GF	GA	GD	Pts
1	Sweden	2	2	0	0	13	3	+10	4
2	Estonia	2	1	0	1	9	6	+3	2
3	Great Britain	2	0	0	2	0	13	−13	0

=== Classification 5–7 ===
==== Round robin ====
Great Britain 0 – 0 Japan
Great Britain 0 – 7 United States

==== Standings ====
Rank	Team	GP	W	D	L	GF	GA	GD	Pts
5	Japan	2	1	1	0	2	1	+1	3
6	United States	2	1	0	1	8	2	+4	2
7	Great Britain	2	0	1	1	0	7	−7	1

== See also ==
- Great Britain at the Paralympics
- Great Britain at the 1998 Winter Olympics
