= Great Britain at the 2010 Winter Paralympics =

- Flag of the United Kingdom
- IPC code: GBR
- NPC: British Paralympic Association
- Website: www.paralympics.org.uk

in Vancouver
- Competitors: 12 in 2 sports
- Flag bearer: Michael McCreadie
- Medals: Gold 0 Silver 0 Bronze 0 Total 0

Winter Paralympics appearances (overview)
- 1976; 1980; 1984; 1988; 1992; 1994; 1998; 2002; 2006; 2010; 2014; 2018; 2022; 2026

The United Kingdom of Great Britain and Northern Ireland competed at the 2010 Winter Paralympics held in Vancouver, British Columbia, Canada. The team was known by it shortened name of Great Britain, for identification purposes.

The team was made up of athletes from the whole United Kingdom; athletes from Northern Ireland, who may elect to hold Irish citizenship under the pre-1999 article 2 of the Irish constitution, are able to be selected to represent either Great Britain or Ireland at the Paralympics. Kelly Gallagher became the first Northern Irish athlete to compete in the Winter Paralympics by taking part in the alpine skiing discipline. Additionally some British overseas territories compete separately from Britain in Paralympic competition. In order to be eligible to take part in the Games athletes had to have a disability that fell into one of the five Paralympics disability categories.

Great Britain fielded twelve athletes in total; a team of five in wheelchair curling, and seven athletes in alpine skiing. The team failed to win a medal for the first time since the 2002 Games, when just two British athletes competed, and although several of the squad finished with top ten results, the overall outcome was described as disappointing. Kelly Gallagher came closest to a medal, finishing fourth in the giant slalom for visually impaired athletes. Britain hosted the next Games when London hosts the 2012 Summer Paralympics.

== Disability classification ==
Every participant at the Paralympics has their disability grouped into one of five disability categories; amputation, the condition may be congenital or sustained through injury or illness; cerebral palsy; wheelchair athletes, there is often overlap between this and other categories; visual impairment, including blindness; Les autres, any physical disability that does not fall strictly under one of the other categories, for example dwarfism or multiple sclerosis. Each Paralympic sport then has its own classifications, dependent upon the specific physical demands of competition. Events are given a code, made of numbers and letters, describing the type of event and classification of the athletes competing. Events with "B" in the code are for athletes with visual impairment, codes LW1 to LW9 are for athletes who stand to compete and LW10 to LW12 are for athletes who compete sitting down. For the 2010 Paralympics alpine skiing events grouped athletes in to sitting, standing and visually impaired. In biathlon events, which contain a target shooting component, blind and visually impaired athletes are able to compete through the use of acoustic signals, whose signal intensity varies dependent upon whether or not the athlete is on target. Wheelchair curling, first added to the Games in 2006 in Turin, is open to athletes with a physical disability in the lower part of the body that requires the everyday use of a wheelchair. Stones may be played by hand while leaning over the side of the wheelchair, or pushed by a delivery stick.

== Alpine skiing ==
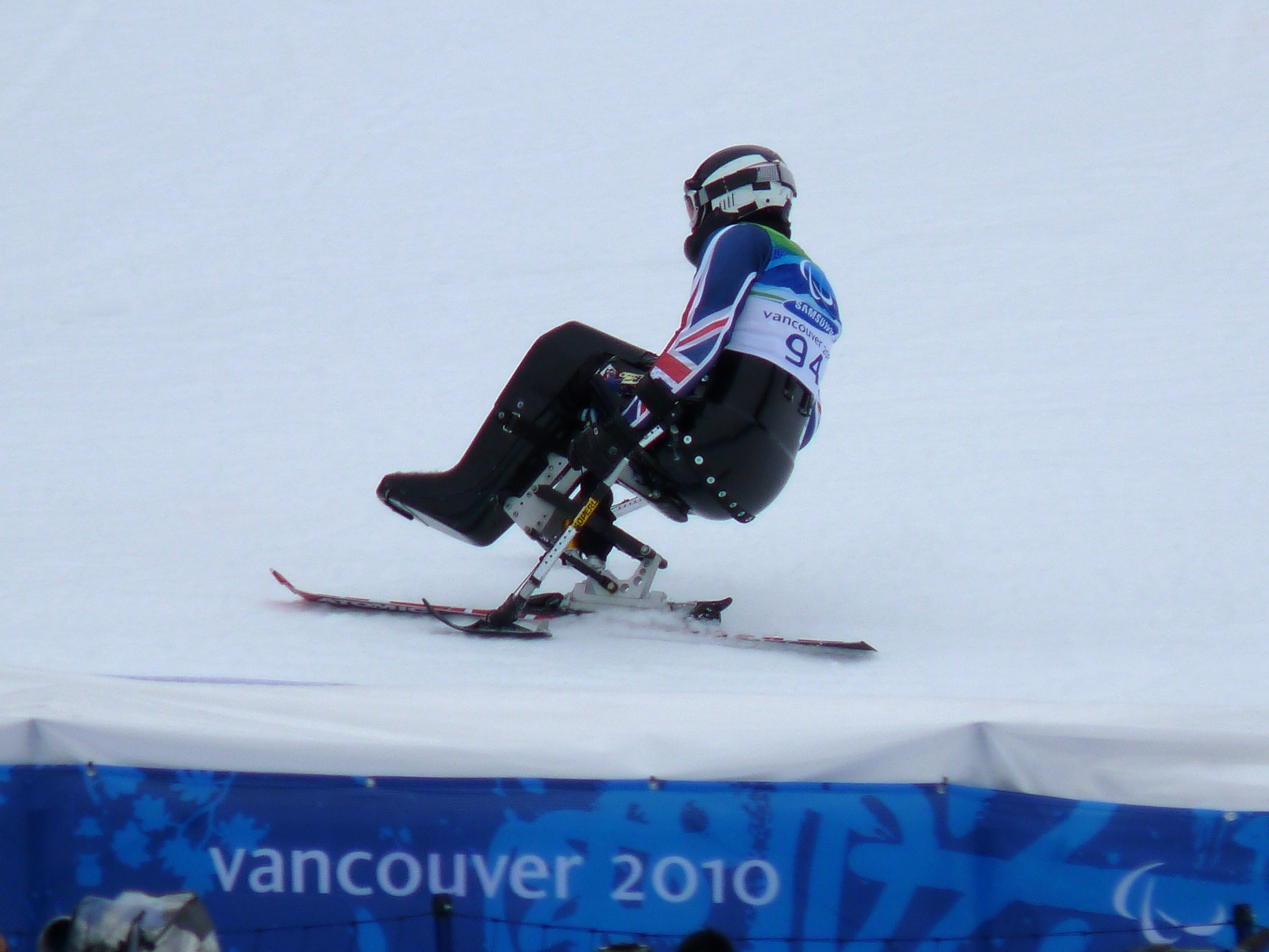
Talan Skeels-Piggins in the first run for the men's slalom (sitting).

Britain's alpine skiing team consisted of four men, Russell Docker, Timothy Farr, Sean Rose and Talan Skeels-Piggins, and three women Jane Sowerby, Anna Turney and Kelly Gallagher, as well as Gallagher's guide, Claire Robb. Docker was competing in his third Winter Paralympics, having previously taken part in Salt Lake City and Turin. The only other British skier with previous Games experience was Rose who had also raced in Turin.

Kelly Gallagher, who became the first Northern Irish athlete to compete in the Winter Paralympics, also achieved the team's highest finish, missing out on a medal by a single place and 3.36 seconds in the women's visually impaired giant slalom. Sean Rose and Anna Turney also achieved top ten finishes. Jane Sowerby's preparations were disrupted by a broken collarbone suffered in November 2009. She failed to finish in the slalom and was disqualified from the giant slalom due to a rolling start.

Men

Athlete	Event	Final					
Athlete	Event	Run 1	Run 2	Run 3	Total Time	Calculated Time	Rank
Russell Docker	Downhill sitting	DSQ	N/A				DSQ
Russell Docker	Giant slalom sitting	DNF	did not finish				
Russell Docker	Slalom sitting	DNF	did not finish				
Russell Docker	Super-G sitting	1:44.07	N/A				29
Timothy Farr	Giant slalom sitting	DSQ	Disqualified				
Timothy Farr	Slalom sitting	58.62	1:04.7	N/A	2:03.32	2:03.28	20
Sean Rose	Combined sitting	DNF	did not finish				
Sean Rose	Downhill sitting	1:20.41	N/A				7
Sean Rose	Giant slalom sitting	DSQ	Disqualified				
Sean Rose	Slalom sitting	53.69	1:05.2	N/A	1:58.89	1:52.74	8
Sean Rose	Super-G sitting	DNF	did not finish				
Talan Skeels-Piggins	Giant slalom sitting	1:29.68	1:31.48	N/A	3:01.16	3:01.16	15
Talan Skeels-Piggins	Slalom sitting	1:13.66	1:16.0	N/A	2:29.66	2:29.65	31
Talan Skeels-Piggins	Super-G sitting	1:37.62	N/A				25

Women

Athlete	Event	Final			
Athlete	Event	Run 1	Run 2	Total Time	Rank
Kelly Gallagher	Giant slalom visually impaired	1:38.65	1:35.88	3:14.53	4
Kelly Gallagher	Slalom visually impaired	1:05.94	1:09.32	2:15.26	6
Jane Sowerby	Giant slalom sitting	DSQ	Disqualified		
Jane Sowerby	Slalom sitting	DNF	did not finish		
Anna Turney	Giant slalom sitting	1:38.28	DNF	did not finish	
Anna Turney	Slalom sitting	1:17.79	1:30.87	2:40.83	6

== Wheelchair curling ==
Britain's wheelchair curling team consisted of Michael McCreadie, Angela Malone, Tom Killin, Aileen Neilson and James Sellar. These five athletes, representing Scotland, had finished fifth at the 2009 World Championships. Three of the team, McCreadie, Malone and Killin, were also in the GB team which won the silver medal in the event at the 2006 Turin Games. McCreadie, who was competing in his seventh Paralympics, won two bronze medals for Lawn Bowls in the 1976 Summer Paralympics and Killin was a previous silver medalist in wheelchair fencing at the 1980 Summer Games.

Paralympic wheelchair curling is played according to the rules of the World Curling Federation, the only modification is that there is no sweeping. The sport was open to both male and female athletes who competed in mixed teams, with a requirement that each team had at least one member of each sex. The format was a round-robin tournament; each nation played all others in a group stage with the top four qualifying for medal playoffs. Great Britain won three of their nine group games, beating teams from Switzerland, Germany, and Japan. They finished in sixth position, which meant that they did not advance to the medal matches.

Squad list	Round robin		Tie-breaker	Semifinal	Final	Rank
Squad list	Opposition Result	Rank	Tie-breaker	Semifinal	Final	Rank
Michael McCreadie; Angela Malone; Tom Killin; Aileen Neilson; James Sellar	Canada; L 2–9	6	Did not advance			6
Michael McCreadie; Angela Malone; Tom Killin; Aileen Neilson; James Sellar	Norway; L 5–7	6	Did not advance			6
Michael McCreadie; Angela Malone; Tom Killin; Aileen Neilson; James Sellar	Switzerland; W 10–2	6	Did not advance			6
Michael McCreadie; Angela Malone; Tom Killin; Aileen Neilson; James Sellar	South Korea; L 4–7	6	Did not advance			6
Michael McCreadie; Angela Malone; Tom Killin; Aileen Neilson; James Sellar	United States; L 7–8	6	Did not advance			6
Michael McCreadie; Angela Malone; Tom Killin; Aileen Neilson; James Sellar	Germany; W 9–2	6	Did not advance			6
Michael McCreadie; Angela Malone; Tom Killin; Aileen Neilson; James Sellar	Sweden; L 6–7	6	Did not advance			6
Michael McCreadie; Angela Malone; Tom Killin; Aileen Neilson; James Sellar	Italy; L 3–6	6	Did not advance			6
Michael McCreadie; Angela Malone; Tom Killin; Aileen Neilson; James Sellar	Japan; W 10–4	6	Did not advance			6

== See also ==
- Great Britain at the 2010 Winter Olympics
- Great Britain at the Paralympics
