= Great Britain at the 1984 Winter Paralympics =

- Flag of the United Kingdom
- IPC code: GBR
- NPC: British Paralympic Association
- Website: www.paralympics.org.uk

in Innsbruck
- Competitors: 22 in 3 sports
- Medals Ranked 12th: Gold 0 Silver 4 Bronze 6 Total 10

Winter Paralympics appearances (overview)
- 1976; 1980; 1984; 1988; 1992; 1994; 1998; 2002; 2006; 2010; 2014; 2018; 2022; 2026

The United Kingdom of Great Britain and Northern Ireland competed as Great Britain at the 1984 Winter Paralympics in Innsbruck, Austria. Britain's twenty-two athletes competed in all three sports: cross-country skiing, alpine skiing and ice sledge speed racing. For the first time in its Winter Paralympic history, Britain won medals, albeit no gold; British athletes obtained four silver medals and six bronze - the country's best performance at the Winter Paralympics until they achieved their first gold medal in 2014, and still the best performance in terms of number of medals won.

== Medallists ==
Medal	Name	Sport	Event
Silver	Denise Smith	Ice sledge speed racing	Women's 100 metres gr I
Silver	Denise Smith	Ice sledge speed racing	Women's 300 metres gr I
Silver	Denise Smith	Ice sledge speed racing	Women's 500 metres gr I
Silver	Ken Robertson	Ice sledge speed racing	Men's 300 metres gr I
Bronze	Ken Robertson	Ice sledge speed racing	Men's 100 metres gr I
Bronze	Ann Peskey	Ice sledge speed racing	Women's 100 metres gr I
Bronze	Ann Peskey	Ice sledge speed racing	Women's 300 metres gr I
Bronze	Ann Peskey	Ice sledge speed racing	Women's 500 metres gr I
Bronze	John Watkins	Alpine skiing	Men's alpine combination LW5/7
Bronze	Peter Young	Cross-country skiing	Men's short distance 10 km B1

== See also ==
- Great Britain at the 1984 Winter Olympics
