= Anne Mette Samdal =

Norwegian wheelchair curler and ice sledge speed racer

- Curler ♀
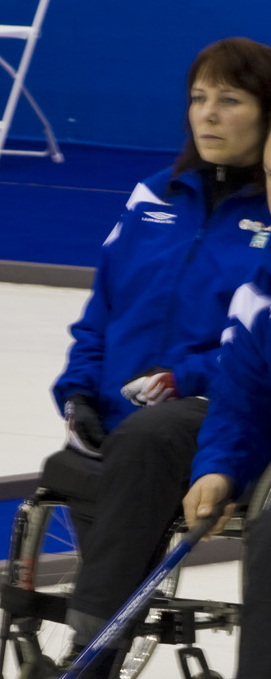
- Born: 15 June 1971 (age 55); Trondheim

Team
- Curling club: Trondheim Curlingklubb, Trondheim

Curling career
- Member Association: Norway
- World Wheelchair Championship: 2 (2008, 2009)
- Paralympic: Ice sledge speed racing: 1 (1998), Wheelchair curling: 2 (2010, 2014)
Medal record
Ice sledge speed racing
Winter Paralympics
Gold medal – first place	1998 Nagano	100 m LW11
Gold medal – first place	1998 Nagano	500 m LW11
Wheelchair curling
World Wheelchair Championship
Gold medal – first place	2008 Sursee

Anne Mette Samdal (born 15 June 1971 in Trondheim) is a Norwegian wheelchair curler and ice sledge speed racer.

As an ice sledge speed racer she participated at the 1998 Winter Paralympic Games and won two gold medals at 100 m and 500 m LW11 event.

As a wheelchair curler she participated at the 2010 and 2014 Winter Paralympics. She is a 2008 World wheelchair champion curler.

== Wheelchair curling teams and events ==
Season	Skip	Third	Second	Lead	Alternate	Coach	Events
2007–08	Rune Lorentsen	Jostein Stordahl	Geir Arne Skogstad	Lene Tystad	Anne Mette Samdal	Thoralf Hognestad	WWhCC 2008 (gold)
2008–09	Rune Lorentsen	Geir Arne Skogstad	Jostein Stordahl	Anne Mette Samdal	Lene Tystad	Thoralf Hognestad	WWhCC 2009 (7th)
2009–10	Rune Lorentsen	Jostein Stordahl	Geir Arne Skogstad	Lene Tystad	Anne Mette Samdal	Per Christensen	WPG 2010 (9th)
2013–14	Rune Lorentsen	Jostein Stordahl	Anne Mette Samdal	Terje Rafdal	Sissel Løchen	Ole Ingvaldsen	WPG 2014 (8th)
