= Great Britain at the 2002 Winter Paralympics =

- Flag of the United Kingdom
- IPC code: GBR
- NPC: British Paralympic Association
- Website: www.paralympics.org.uk

in Salt Lake City
- Competitors: 2 in 1 sport
- Medals Ranked =23rd: Gold 0 Silver 0 Bronze 0 Total 0

Winter Paralympics appearances (overview)
- 1976; 1980; 1984; 1988; 1992; 1994; 1998; 2002; 2006; 2010; 2014; 2018; 2022; 2026

The United Kingdom of Great Britain and Northern Ireland competed at the 2002 Winter Paralympics held in Salt Lake City, Utah, United States, from 7 to 16 March 2002. The team was known by it shortened name of Great Britain, for identification purposes. The team was able to be made up of athletes from the whole United Kingdom; athletes from Northern Ireland, who elected to hold Irish citizenship under the pre-1999 article 2 of the Irish constitution, were eligible to represent either Great Britain or Ireland at the Paralympics. However no Northern Irish athletes took part in the Winter Paralympics until 2010 in Vancouver. In order to be eligible to take part in the Games athletes had to have a disability that fell into one of the six Paralympics disability categories.

Two British athletes competed, both in alpine skiing events, and no medals were won. The size of the team was a decrease from that which had entered previous Games, in the 1998 Winter Paralympics 20 British athletes had participated. One reason for this is that whilst funding for the two athletes was provided by the British Paralympic Association, it totalled only £1,500 compared to the £4 million worth of funding available to British athletes at the 2002 Winter Olympics.

== Alpine skiing ==
Both of Britain's athletes at the Games competed in alpine skiing events, funding for the two athletes was provided by the British Paralympic Association. Russell Docker, who was paralysed from the waist down following a skiing accident in 1995, appeared at the Paralympics for the first time and competed in the LW12 classification. He crashed out in the downhill event and failed to complete his other three races. Stephen Napier, who was disabled after being knocked off a motorbike by an unmarked police car in 1995, also competed in four events in the LW10 classification. His highest finish was sixth in the Super-G and he also had three seventh-place finishes. In each of his events Napier was the lowest ranked athlete to complete the course.

Calculated time

To ensure a fair event when athletes with differing disabilities compete, times achieved are sometimes modified by a factor percentage, to produce a result known as "Calculated Time". It is this time that decides the result of the races. Actual times recorded is also listed.

Athlete	Event	Time	Factor (%)	Calculated time	Rank
Russell Docker	Downhill LW12	Did not finish			
Russell Docker	Giant slalom LW12	Did not finish			
Russell Docker	Slalom LW12	Did not finish			
Russell Docker	Super-G LW12	Did not finish			
Stephen Napier	Downhill LW10	2:13.93	81.27254	1:48.85	7
Stephen Napier	Giant slalom LW10	3:43.04	79.52176	2:57.37	7
Stephen Napier	Slalom LW10	3:34.38	66.95783	2:23.55	7
Stephen Napier	Super-G LW10	1:54.33	79.98729	1:31.45	6

== See also ==
- Great Britain at the Paralympics
- Great Britain at the 2002 Winter Olympics
