= Great Britain at the 2006 Winter Paralympics =

- Flag of the United Kingdom
- IPC code: GBR
- NPC: British Paralympic Association
- Website: www.paralympics.org.uk

in Turin
- Competitors: 20 in 3 sports
- Medals Ranked 17th: Gold 0 Silver 1 Bronze 0 Total 1

Winter Paralympics appearances (overview)
- 1976; 1980; 1984; 1988; 1992; 1994; 1998; 2002; 2006; 2010; 2014; 2018; 2022

The United Kingdom of Great Britain and Northern Ireland competed at the 2006 Winter Paralympics held in Turin, Italy. The team was known by it shortened name of Great Britain, for identification purposes.

The team was able to be made up of athletes from the whole United Kingdom; athletes from Northern Ireland, who elected to hold Irish citizenship under the pre-1999 article 2 of the Irish constitution, were eligible to represent either Great Britain or Ireland at the Paralympics. However no Northern Irish athletes took part in the Winter Paralympics for either team until 2010 in Vancouver. All competitors had disabilities that were organised into one of five Paralympic categories for the Games.

Great Britain entered a total of twenty athletes at the Games; three individuals in alpine skiing and teams of twelve athletes in ice sledge hockey and five athletes in wheelchair curling. The team won a single silver medal, in the debut sport of wheelchair curling, and finished seventeenth in the medal table. In addition to the medal there were top ten finishes from Sean Rose and Liz Miller, in alpine skiing, and the ice sledge hockey team.

== Medallists ==
Great Britain placed seventeenth in the medal table with a single silver medal and zero gold or bronze medals. The following British athletes won medals at the Games. In the 'by discipline' sections below, medallists' names are in bold.

Medal	Name	Sport	Event
Silver	Frank Duffy; Ken Dickson; Tom Killin; Angie Malone; Michael McCreadie	Wheelchair curling	Mixed team

== Alpine skiing ==
Britain entered three skiers, two men and one woman, into the Games. Russell Docker, one of only two athletes to have competed for Britain at the 2002 Winter Paralympics, appeared in his second Games, this time in sitting events having switched to the use of a monoski. Sean Rose, also a sit-skier, and Liz Miller, a standing skier who uses a prosthetic leg, were the other British participants. The three athletes were members of the British Adaptive Ski Team, which is run by national ski charity Disability Snowsport UK. Each of the three skiers raced in four events in their respective categories; downhill, giant slalom, slalom and Super-G. Rose had the highest finish of the three; he placed sixth in the men's sitting downhill, 0.7 seconds outside of the medal positions. Russell Docker crashed in the same event and did not finish. Docker also failed to finish in the slalom, as did Rose in the giant slalom. Miller completed the course in each of her events with a best finish of tenth in the downhill.

Calculated time

To ensure a fair event when athletes with differing disabilities compete, times achieved are sometimes modified by a factor percentage, to produce a result known as "Calculated Time". It is this time that decides the result of the races. Actual times recorded are also listed.

Athlete	Event	Time	Calculated time	Rank
Russell Docker	Downhill sitting	Did not finish		
Russell Docker	Giant slalom sitting	2:31.53	2:09.89	29
Russell Docker	Slalom sitting	Did not finish		
Russell Docker	Super-G sitting	1:37.20	1:21.96	23
Sean Rose	Downhill sitting	1:39.96	1:22.71	6
Sean Rose	Giant slalom sitting	Did not finish		
Sean Rose	Slalom sitting	2:16.00	1:43.92	21
Sean Rose	Super-G sitting	1:38.26	1:21.65	22

Women

Athlete	Event	Time	Calculated time	Rank
Liz Miller	Downhill standing	1:40.44	1:40.19	10
Liz Miller	Giant slalom standing	2:14.44	2:13.46	14
Liz Miller	Slalom standing	1:51.73	1:50.66	17
Liz Miller	Super-G standing	1:29.64	1:29.20	16

== Ice sledge hockey ==
Britain's ice sledge hockey team took the final qualification spot for the Games by winning the qualifying tournament in Italy in November 2005. The team of twelve athletes included Stephen Thomas who had previously participated in Summer Paralympic sailing. Goalkeeper Gary Vaughan was named in the initial squad but was unable to complete due a high blood pressure condition and was replaced by Matt Lloyd. Britain competed in pool B alongside teams from Canada, Italy and Norway. Having suffered heavy defeats in their first two matches the team beat hosts Italy in their final pool match to finish third in the group. In the classification rounds they lost to Sweden before beating Italy again to finish in seventh position.

Squad list	Pool B		Classification semi-final	7th place game	Rank
Squad list	Opposition Result	Rank	Classification semi-final	7th place game	Rank
Simon Berry; Mark Briggs; Gary Farmer; David French; Matt Lloyd; Karl Nicholson; Philip Saunders; Nathan Stephens; Stephen Thomas; Ian Warner; Richard Whitehead; Russell Willey	Canada; **L** 0–9	3	Sweden; **L** 0–3	Italy; **W** 2–1	7
Simon Berry; Mark Briggs; Gary Farmer; David French; Matt Lloyd; Karl Nicholson; Philip Saunders; Nathan Stephens; Stephen Thomas; Ian Warner; Richard Whitehead; Russell Willey	Norway; **L** 0–6	3	Sweden; **L** 0–3	Italy; **W** 2–1	7
Simon Berry; Mark Briggs; Gary Farmer; David French; Matt Lloyd; Karl Nicholson; Philip Saunders; Nathan Stephens; Stephen Thomas; Ian Warner; Richard Whitehead; Russell Willey	Italy; **W** 2–1	3	Sweden; **L** 0–3	Italy; **W** 2–1	7

== Wheelchair curling ==
The British wheelchair curling team was made up of Frank Duffy the skip, Ken Dickson, Tom Killin, Angie Malone and Michael McCreadie. This was the same team that had won the World Championships in January 2005 in Glasgow, all but Killin had also won the 2004 World Championships, and many considered them strong contenders for a medal. Although this was the first time wheelchair curling had been included as a Paralympic sport the team did have previous Games experience. Michael McCreadie, who made his first Paralympics appearance in 1972, was competing in his sixth Paralympics and had previously won two bronze medals for Lawn Bowls in the 1976 Summer Paralympics. Tom Killin was a previous silver medallist in wheelchair fencing at the 1980 Summer Games. The team received the same preparation as Great Britain's Olympic Curlers; funding came from the National Lottery as well as the Scottish Institute of Sport. The team's coach, Tom Pendreigh, was also personal coach of the men's Olympic skip David Murdoch.

Paralympic wheelchair curling is played according to the rules of the World Curling Federation, the only modification is that there is no sweeping. The sport was open to both male and female athletes who competed in mixed teams, with a requirement that each team had at least one member of each sex. The format was a round-robin tournament; each nation played all others in a group stage with the top four qualifying for medal playoffs. Britain won their group games against the teams from Denmark, Sweden, Italy and the United States, and lost the matches against Switzerland, Norway and Canada. Their record of four wins and three losses meant they finished the group stage in second place and advanced directly to the medal rounds. In the first end of the semi-final, against Sweden, Britain stole three and went on to win the match 7–3. In the final the team faced Canada. Trailing 6–3 in the final end skip Frank Duffy had an opportunity, with the last stone of the tournament for an open hit of a Canadian stone. If successful he would have scored four for Britain and won them the gold medal but he threw too hard and the shot tracked an inch wide. This meant that Canada scored one to win 7–4, leaving the British team as silver medallists.

Squad list	Round robin		Tie-breaker	Semi-final	Final	Rank
Squad list	Opposition Result	Rank	Tie-breaker	Semi-final	Final	Rank
**Frank Duffy**; **Ken Dickson**; **Tom Killin**; **Angela Malone**; **Michael McCreadie**	Switzerland; **L** 3–4	2	N/A	Sweden; **W** 7–3	Canada; **L** 4–7	Silver medal
**Frank Duffy**; **Ken Dickson**; **Tom Killin**; **Angela Malone**; **Michael McCreadie**	Denmark; **W** 5–3	2	N/A	Sweden; **W** 7–3	Canada; **L** 4–7	Silver medal
**Frank Duffy**; **Ken Dickson**; **Tom Killin**; **Angela Malone**; **Michael McCreadie**	Norway; **L** 6–7	2	N/A	Sweden; **W** 7–3	Canada; **L** 4–7	Silver medal
**Frank Duffy**; **Ken Dickson**; **Tom Killin**; **Angela Malone**; **Michael McCreadie**	Sweden; **W** 7–2	2	N/A	Sweden; **W** 7–3	Canada; **L** 4–7	Silver medal
**Frank Duffy**; **Ken Dickson**; **Tom Killin**; **Angela Malone**; **Michael McCreadie**	Italy; **W** 5–3	2	N/A	Sweden; **W** 7–3	Canada; **L** 4–7	Silver medal
**Frank Duffy**; **Ken Dickson**; **Tom Killin**; **Angela Malone**; **Michael McCreadie**	Canada; **L** 6–7	2	N/A	Sweden; **W** 7–3	Canada; **L** 4–7	Silver medal
**Frank Duffy**; **Ken Dickson**; **Tom Killin**; **Angela Malone**; **Michael McCreadie**	United States; **W** 5–2	2	N/A	Sweden; **W** 7–3	Canada; **L** 4–7	Silver medal

== See also ==
- 2006 Winter Paralympics
- Great Britain at the 2006 Winter Olympics
