= Britt Mjaasund Øyen =

Norwegian ice sledge speed racer and hockey player

Personal information
- Born: 7 September 1944 (age 81)
Medal record
Representing Norway
Winter Paralympic Games
Women's cross-country skiing
Gold medal – first place	1980 Geilo	5 km - class 5
Gold medal – first place	1980 Geilo	10 km - class 5
Women's ice sledge speed racing
Gold medal – first place	1980 Geilo	100 m - class IV
Gold medal – first place	1980 Geilo	500 m - class IV
Gold medal – first place	1980 Geilo	800 m - class IV
Gold medal – first place	1984 Innsbruck	100 m - gr II
Gold medal – first place	1984 Innsbruck	500 m - gr II
Gold medal – first place	1984 Innsbruck	700 m - gr II
Silver medal – second place	1984 Innsbruck	1000 m - gr II
Gold medal – first place	1994 Lillehammer	100 m - LW10-11
Gold medal – first place	1994 Lillehammer	500 m - LW10-11
Bronze medal – third place	1994 Lillehammer	700 m - LW10-11
Silver medal – second place	1994 Lillehammer	1000 m - LW10-11
Ice sledge hockey
Silver medal – second place	1994 Lillehammer	Team competition

Britt Mjaasund Øyen (born 7 September 1944) is a Norwegian known for medals in Ice sledge speed racing at the Winter Paralympics. Øyen also won Paralympic medals in cross-country skiing (1980) and ice sledge hockey (1994). She received the Erling Stordahls ærespris in 2012.
