= Great Britain at the 2018 Winter Paralympics =

- Flag of the United Kingdom
- IPC code: GBR
- NPC: British Paralympic Association
- Website: www.paralympics.org.uk

in Pyeongchang, South Korea 9-18 March 2018
- Competitors: 17 in 5 sports
- Medals Ranked 13th: Gold 1 Silver 4 Bronze 2 Total 7

Winter Paralympics appearances (overview)
- 1976; 1980; 1984; 1988; 1992; 1994; 1998; 2002; 2006; 2010; 2014; 2018; 2022; 2026

The United Kingdom of Great Britain and Northern Ireland competed at the 2018 Winter Paralympics in Pyeongchang, South Korea, from 9 to 18 March 2018. They were known by the shortened name of Great Britain, for identification purposes.

== Medallists ==
Medal	Name	Sport	Event	Date
Gold	Menna Fitzpatrick; Guide: Jennifer Kehoe	Alpine skiing	Women's slalom, vision impaired	17 March
Silver	Millie Knight; Guide: Brett Wild	Alpine skiing	Women's downhill, vision impaired	10 March
Silver	Millie Knight; Guide: Brett Wild	Alpine skiing	Women's super-G, vision impaired	11 March
Silver	Menna Fitzpatrick; Guide: Jennifer Kehoe	Alpine skiing	Women's super combined, vision impaired	13 March
Silver	Menna Fitzpatrick; Guide: Jennifer Kehoe	Alpine skiing	Women's giant slalom, vision impaired	14 March
Bronze	Menna Fitzpatrick; Guide: Jennifer Kehoe	Alpine skiing	Women's super-G, vision impaired	11 March
Bronze	Millie Knight; Guide: Brett Wild	Alpine skiing	Women's slalom, vision impaired	17 March

== Medal and performance targets ==
UK Sport announced "an ambition of at least 7 medals which if achieved would mark the best performance in 30 years, and best since National Lottery funding came on stream in 1997".

== Competitors ==
Great Britain sent a total of 17 athletes to the games. This was the most sent by the British team since 2006.

Sport	Men	Women	Total
Alpine skiing	4	4	8
Biathlon	1*	0	1*
Cross-country skiing	1*	0	1*
Snowboarding	3	0	3
Wheelchair curling	3	2	5
Total	11	6	17

- Scott Meenagh was selected to compete in both the biathlon and cross-country skiing competitions.

== Alpine skiing ==
Women

Athlete	Classification	Event	Run 1			Run 2			Final/Total		
Athlete	Classification	Event	Time	Diff	Rank	Time	Diff	Rank	Time	Diff	Rank
Kelly Gallagher; Guide: Gary Smith	Visually impaired	Giant slalom	1:17.33	+6.50	5	1:15.46	+3.29	4	2:32.79	+9.79	5
Kelly Gallagher; Guide: Gary Smith	Visually impaired	Slalom	57.35	+3.77	6	1:01.22	+2.89	6	1:58.57	+6.77	6
Kelly Gallagher; Guide: Gary Smith	Visually impaired	Super-G	—N/a						1:39.75	+9.58	8
Kelly Gallagher; Guide: Gary Smith	Visually impaired	Super combined	1:37.59	+7.75	7	1:00.49	+5.17	6	2:38.08	+10.36	7
Menna Fitzpatrick; Guide: Jennifer Kehoe	Visually impaired	Downhill	—N/a						DNF		
Menna Fitzpatrick; Guide: Jennifer Kehoe	Visually impaired	Giant slalom	1:14.45	+3.62	2	1:13.89	+1.72	3	2:28.34	+5.34	2nd place, silver medalist(s)
Menna Fitzpatrick; Guide: Jennifer Kehoe	Visually impaired	Slalom	54.24	+0.66	2	57.56	-	1	1:51.80	-	1st place, gold medalist(s)
Menna Fitzpatrick; Guide: Jennifer Kehoe	Visually impaired	Super-G	—N/a						1:34.54	+4.37	3rd place, bronze medalist(s)
Menna Fitzpatrick; Guide: Jennifer Kehoe	Visually impaired	Super combined	1:31.49	+1.65	2	57.51	2	+2.19	2:29.00	+1.28	2nd place, silver medalist(s)
Millie Knight; Guide: Brett Wild	Visually impaired	Downhill	—N/a						1:30.58	+0.86	2nd place, silver medalist(s)
Millie Knight; Guide: Brett Wild	Visually impaired	Giant slalom	1:17.97	+7.14	6	1:16.55	+4.38	7	2:34.52	+11.52	7
Millie Knight; Guide: Brett Wild	Visually impaired	Slalom	54.28	+0.70	3	59.11	+1.55	4	1:53.39	+1.59	3rd place, bronze medalist(s)
Millie Knight; Guide: Brett Wild	Visually impaired	Super-G	—N/a						1:33.76	+3.59	2nd place, silver medalist(s)
Millie Knight; Guide: Brett Wild	Visually impaired	Super combined	1:33.63	+3.79	3	58.10	+2.78	5	2:31.73	+4.01	4

Men

Athlete	Classification	Event	Run 1			Run 2			Final/Total		
Athlete	Classification	Event	Time	Diff	Rank	Time	Diff	Rank	Time	Diff	Rank
Chris Lloyd	Standing	Downhill	—N/a						1:34.00	+8.55	20
Chris Lloyd	Standing	Super-G	—N/a						1:34.43	+9.60	25
James Whitley	Standing	Downhill	—N/a						1:29.85	+4.40	10
James Whitley	Standing	Giant slalom	1:09.91	+4.11	=11	1:10.00	+4.56	12	2:19.81	+7.34	11
James Whitley	Standing	Slalom	52.61	+4.10	11	51.80	+4.38	6	1:44.41	+8.30	10
James Whitley	Standing	Super-G	—N/a						1:32.96	+8.13	22
James Whitley	Standing	Super combined	1:30.21	+5.31	13	50.07	+5.13	10	2:20.28	+9.72	11

== Biathlon ==
Men

Athlete	Classification	Event	Result	Rank
Scott Meenagh	Sitting	7.5 km	27:28.1	18
Scott Meenagh	Sitting	12.5 km	54:52.9	13
Scott Meenagh	Sitting	15 km	58:58.1	14

== Cross-country skiing ==
Men

Athlete	Classification	Event	Qualification		Semifinal		Final	
Athlete	Classification	Event	Time	Rank	Time	Rank	Time	Rank
Scott Meenagh	Sitting	1.1 km sprint	3:17.72	16	did not advance			
Scott Meenagh	Sitting	7.5 km	—N/a				25:17.5	14
Scott Meenagh	Sitting	15 km	—N/a				46:07.4	17

== Snowboarding ==
Slalom

Athlete	Event	Run 1		Run 2		Run 3		Result		
Athlete	Event	Time	Rank	Time	Rank	Time	Rank	Time	Diff	Rank
James Barnes-Miller	Men's banked slalom SB-UL	58.23	9	57.00	10	1:08.17	20	57.00	+6.23	=10
Ben Moore	Men's banked slalom SB-UL	56.79	5	54.33	5	DSQ		54.33	+3.56	7
Owen Pick	Men's banked slalom SB-LL2	52.81	7	DSQ		53.26	9	52.81	+4.13	9

Snowboard cross

Athlete	Event	Qualification					1/8 finals	Quarterfinals	Semifinals	Final	
Athlete	Event	Race 1		Race 2		Seed	1/8 finals	Quarterfinals	Semifinals	Final	
Athlete	Event	Time	Rank	Time	Rank	Seed	Opponent Result	Opponent Result	Opponent Result	Opponent Result	Rank
James Barnes-Miller	Men's snowboard cross SB-UL	1:03.11	5	1:06.56	14	6	Jiang (CHN); W	Patmore (AUS); L	did not advance		7
Ben Moore	Men's snowboard cross SB-UL	1:04.80	9	1:04.47	7	8	Priolo (ITA); L	did not advance			10
Owen Pick	Men's snowboard cross SB-LL2	1:00.11	6	59.32	2	5	Codina (ARG); L	did not advance			9

== Wheelchair curling ==
Summary

Team	Event	Group stage												Tiebreaker	Semifinal	Final / BM	
Team	Event	Opposition Score	Opposition Score	Opposition Score	Opposition Score	Opposition Score	Opposition Score	Opposition Score	Opposition Score	Opposition Score	Opposition Score	Opposition Score	Rank	Opposition Score	Opposition Score	Opposition Score	Rank
Aileen Neilson; Hugh Nibloe; Gregor Ewan; Robert McPherson; Angie Malone	Mixed	(Norway) NOR; W 5–2	(Switzerland) SUI; L 4–7	(Finland) FIN; W 9–2	(Sweden) SWE; W 6–1	(Canada) CAN; W 8–1	(Slovakia) SVK; L 5–6	(International Paralympic Committee) NPA; L 2–8	(Germany) GER; W 8–3	(United States) USA; L 3–9	(South Korea) KOR; L 4–5	(China) CHN; L 3–9	7	did not advance			

=== Round Robin ===
Standings

Pos	Team	Pld	W	L	PF	PA	PD	PCT	Ends Won	Ends Lost	Blank Ends	Stolen Ends	Shot %	Qualification
1	South Korea	11	9	2	65	51	14	0.818	38	36	9	11	66%	Advance to playoffs
2	Canada	11	9	2	74	45	29	0.818	47	28	6	27	62%	Advance to playoffs
3	China	11	9	2	85	42	43	0.818	43	32	2	16	67%	Advance to playoffs
4	Norway	11	7	4	55	57	−2	0.636	41	35	5	15	58%	Advance to playoffs
5	Neutral Paralympic Athletes	11	5	6	61	63	−2	0.455	44	37	2	23	62%	
6	Switzerland	11	5	6	56	63	−7	0.455	36	45	2	11	61%	
7	Great Britain	11	5	6	57	53	4	0.455	41	41	6	20	62%	
8	Germany	11	5	6	57	68	−11	0.455	37	39	5	16	54%	
9	Slovakia	11	4	7	62	72	−10	0.364	39	46	1	11	57%	
10	Sweden	11	4	7	47	66	−19	0.364	29	45	8	8	57%	
11	Finland	11	2	9	53	87	−34	0.182	35	46	1	11	51%	
12	United States	11	2	9	58	63	−5	0.182	37	45	3	12	60%	

Source: Paralympic.org

Results

Great Britain had a bye in draws 2, 4, 6, 9, 14 and 16.

Draw 1

Saturday, 10 March, 14:35

Sheet A	1	2	3	4	5	6	7	8	Final
Norway (Lorentsen) 🔨	1	0	0	0	0	1	0	0	2
Great Britain (Neilson)	0	1	0	2	0	0	1	1	5

Draw 3

Sunday, 11 March, 9:35

Sheet C	1	2	3	4	5	6	7	8	Final
Switzerland (Wagner)	0	0	3	0	1	2	0	1	7
Great Britain (Neilson) 🔨	1	1	0	1	0	0	1	0	4

Draw 5

Sunday, 11 March, 19:35

Sheet B	1	2	3	4	5	6	7	8	Final
Great Britain (Neilson)	2	0	0	1	2	2	2	X	9
Finland (S. Karjalainen) 🔨	0	1	1	0	0	0	0	X	2

Draw 7

Monday, 12 March, 14:35

Sheet D	1	2	3	4	5	6	7	8	Final
Sweden (Petersson Dahl)	0	0	0	0	0	0	1	X	1
Great Britain (Neilson) 🔨	2	1	1	1	1	0	0	X	6

Draw 8

Monday, 12 March, 19:35

Sheet C	1	2	3	4	5	6	7	8	Final
Great Britain (Neilson)	0	1	1	1	2	0	3	X	8
Canada (Ideson) 🔨	0	0	0	0	0	1	0	X	1

Draw 10

Tuesday, 13 March, 14:35

Sheet B	1	2	3	4	5	6	7	8	Final
Great Britain (Neilson) 🔨	0	1	0	1	0	1	1	1	5
Slovakia (Ďuriš)	1	0	3	0	2	0	0	0	6

Draw 11

Tuesday, 13 March, 19:35

Sheet A	1	2	3	4	5	6	7	8	Final
Neutral Paralympic Athletes (Kurokhtin)	1	1	0	1	2	2	1	X	8
Great Britain (Neilson) 🔨	0	0	2	0	0	0	0	X	2

Draw 12

Wednesday, 14 March, 9:35

Sheet B	1	2	3	4	5	6	7	8	Final
Germany (Putzich) 🔨	1	0	1	0	1	0	0	X	3
Great Britain (Neilson)	0	1	0	2	0	3	2	X	8

Draw 13

Wednesday, 14 March, 14:35

Sheet A	1	2	3	4	5	6	7	8	Final
Great Britain (Neilson) 🔨	0	1	0	0	1	0	1	X	3
United States (Black)	1	0	3	2	0	3	0	X	9

Draw 15

Thursday, 15 March, 9:35

Sheet D	1	2	3	4	5	6	7	8	Final
Great Britain (Neilson)	1	0	0	2	1	0	0	0	4
South Korea (Seo) 🔨	0	2	0	0	0	1	1	1	5

Draw 17

Thursday, 15 March, 19:35

Sheet C	1	2	3	4	5	6	7	8	Final
China (Wang)	0	2	0	2	0	5	X	X	9
Great Britain (Neilson) 🔨	1	0	0	0	2	0	X	X	3

== See also ==
- Great Britain at the 2018 Winter Olympics
