= Knut Lundstrøm =

Norwegian Paralympic skier (born 1951)

Personal information
- Born: 17 February 1951 (age 75)

Sport
- Sport: Para cross-country skiing Ice sledge speed racing
Medal record
Representing Norway
Winter Paralympics
Ice sledge speed racing
Gold medal – first place	1988 Innsbruck	100m Gr II
Gold medal – first place	1988 Innsbruck	500m Gr II
Gold medal – first place	1988 Innsbruck	1000m Gr II
Gold medal – first place	1988 Innsbruck	1500m Gr II
Gold medal – first place	1998 Nagano	100m LW11
Gold medal – first place	1998 Nagano	500m LW11
Gold medal – first place	1998 Nagano	1000m LW11
Gold medal – first place	1998 Nagano	1500m LW11
Silver medal – second place	1994 Lillehammer	100m LW10-11
Silver medal – second place	1994 Lillehammer	1000m LW10-11
Silver medal – second place	1994 Lillehammer	1500m LW10-11
Bronze medal – third place	1994 Lillehammer	500m LW10-11
Para cross-country skiing
Gold medal – first place	1988 Innsbruck	5km Gr II
Gold medal – first place	1988 Innsbruck	10km Gr II
Gold medal – first place	1988 Innsbruck	3.25km relay Gr I-II
Gold medal – first place	1992 Albertville	3.25km relay LW10-11
Gold medal – first place	1994 Lillehammer	15km sitski LW11
Gold medal – first place	1994 Lillehammer	3.25km relay sitting
Silver medal – second place	1994 Lillehammer	10km sitski LW11
Silver medal – second place	1992 Albertville	10km LW11
Bronze medal – third place	1992 Albertville	5km LW11

Knut Lundstrøm (born 17 February 1951) is a retired Norwegian Paralympic cross-country skier and ice sledge speed racer. He is amongst the most successful Paralympians of all time having won 14 gold medals, 5 silvers, and 2 bronzes He attended four Games between 1988 and 1998, competing in cross country skiing and ice sledge speed racing events.
