= Talan Skeels-Piggins =

British para-alpine skier

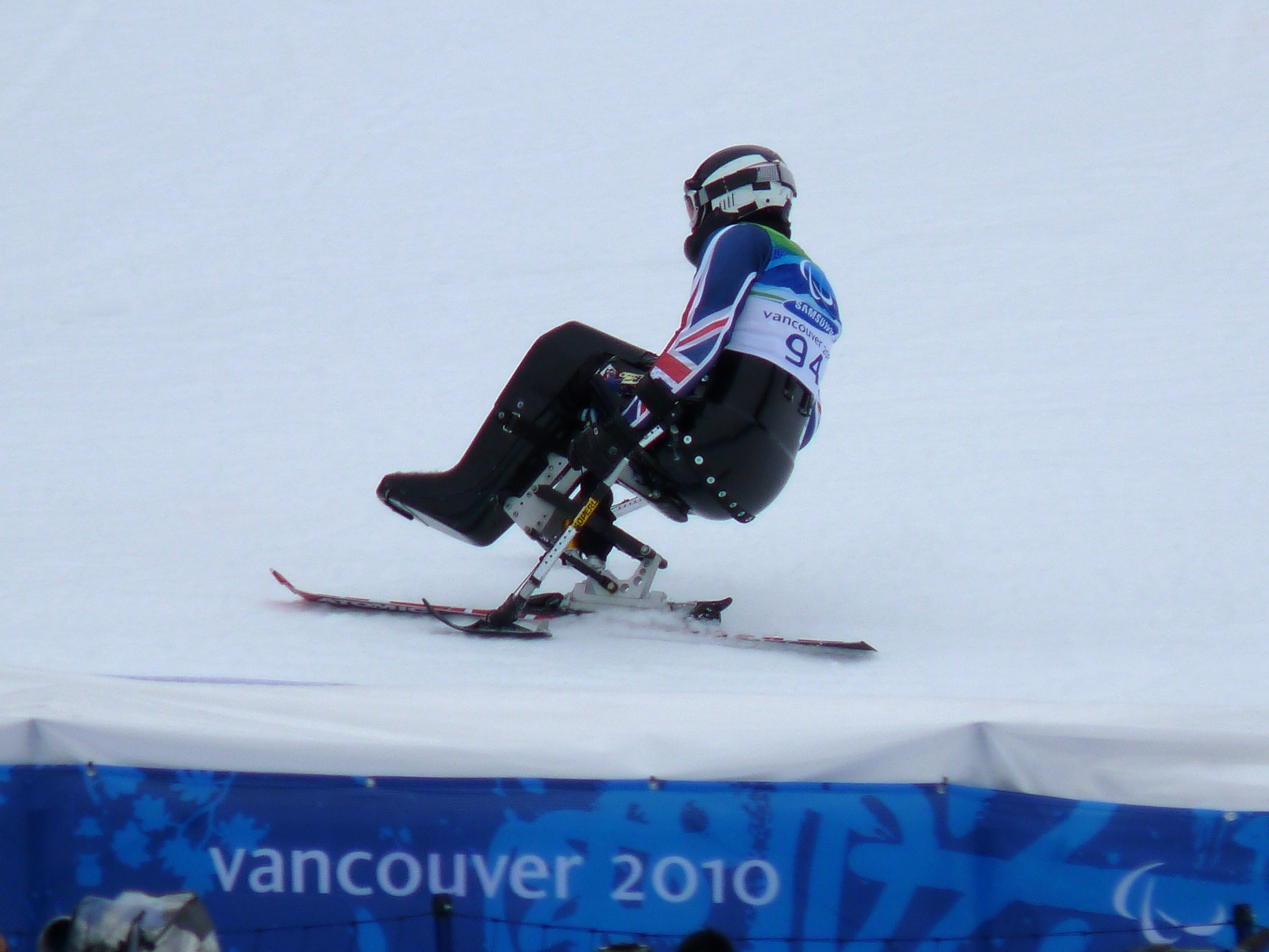
- At the 2010 Winter Paralympics, in Vancouver, Canada

Personal information
- Nationality: British
- Born: 10 September 1970 (age 55) Bristol, England

Sport
- Country: Great Britain
- Sport: Alpine skiing
- Updated on 25 May 2010

Talan Skeels-Piggins (born 10 September 1970) is a British children's author, a double 600cc Motorcycle World Champion (paralysed category) and former Winter Paralympic alpine skier. Skeels-Piggins was a member of the British alpine skiing team. Skeels-Piggins used a sit-ski in alpine competitions.

Skeels-Piggins was formerly a Royal Navy fighter controller, and a PE teacher at St Laurence School, Bradford-on-Avon. He was paralysed from the chest down following a motorcycle accident in March 2003, which shattered his spine and broke his neck. After his injury, he was retained in the Armed Forces and serves as a lieutenant in the Royal Naval Reserves.

He began skiing on a family holiday at the age of nine. Whilst in the Royal Navy, he was selected for the RN Ski Team and was captain of the Scotland, Northern England & Northern Ireland Command team. He was placed fourth overall in the 1995 Navy Ski Championships. After his accident he chose to start skiing using a sit-ski with the goal of competing at the Paralympics. He was selected to compete for the Great Britain team 14 months after sustaining his injuries and competes in the LW10/1 classification for athletes with paraplegia with no upper abdominal function and no functional sitting balance.

By 2008 he had reached a world ranking of 5th in the downhill event. At the 2009 World Championships in Korea, he finished 31st in the super-G and improved on that position with a 26th-placed finish at the 2009 World Cup in Whistler.

In 2010 he won two bronze medals at the NorAm Cup in Kimberly, Canada to secure his qualification for the 2010 Winter Paralympics. He competed for Great Britain at the 2010 Winter Paralympics in the men's slalom, giant slalom and super-G. His best finish was 15th in the giant slalom; he also finished 25th in the super-G and 31st in the slalom.

In 2011, together with Russell O'Neill and Halina Tomlinson, Talan founded 'The Bike Experience', a charity established to help motorcycle riders who are now paraplegic to ride again. Based at Castle Combe circuit in Wiltshire this is free experience for disabled bikers who would like to ride on a racing circuit:

Level 1 teaches the riders how to use the adapted machine, with slow speed work on a closed-off section of the circuit. This is normally followed by Level 2 after a short break.

Level 2 riders take part in track work and the session is spent working on learning the racing line around the circuit, ensuring correct gearing is selected and pressing on to a quick pace.

Level 3 is also a track session focusing on one-on-one tuition with the riders, concentrating on any issues they may have and working towards full confidence in taking part in track days.

2011 Talan became the first paraplegic in the history of motor-racing to gain an ACU 'Hill-Climb and Sprint' Race Licence and compete against able bodied racers in solo motorcycles.

2011 Talan was awarded an honorary Masters (Education) from University of Chichester for Outstanding Sporting Achievement and continued Education Development in Schools, Colleges and Universities.

2012 Talan became the first paraplegic in the history of motor-racing to gain an ACU Road Race licence and compete against able-bodies racers. Race held at Snetterton on 23/24 June 2012 with Club Thundersport, taking part in the Minitwin Class on a modified Suzuki SV650. Came 12th out of 38 in 2012 Minitwin Championship.

2013 Silver Medal in IPC NorAm Adaptive SBX Competition. Becomes first Monoskier to win IPC medals in both Alpine and Adaptive SBX races.

2015 World Champion 600cc (paralysed category) at Bridgestone World Cup in Vallelunga, Italy. Also took 2nd place 600cc (all disabled categories). He competed again in the 2018 Disabled World Championship, with podiums at Le Mans and Magny Cours, he finished second overall in the 600cc class and took First for paralysed riders.

Skeels-Piggins is a qualified teacher, and formerly taught physical education at St Laurence School, Bradford-on-Avon.

In September 2020 his first book, The Little Person Inside, was published. The book is aimed at inspiring children and getting them to believe in their own ability.
