= Bente Grønli =

Norwegian Paralympic athlete

Personal information
- Full name: Bente Kristine Grønli
- Nationality: Norwegian
- Born: 25 March 1956 Trondheim, Norway
- Died: 20 January 1996 (aged 39)

Sport
- Sport: Ice sledge speed racing Swimming
Medal record
Representing Norway
Paralympic Games
Ice sledge speed racing
Silver medal – second place	1980 Gelio	Women's 100 m v
Silver medal – second place	1980 Gelio	Women's 500 m v
Silver medal – second place	1980 Gelio	Women's 800 m v
Swimming
Gold medal – first place	1976 Toronto	Women's 50 m Backstroke 4
Silver medal – second place	1972 Heidelberg	Women's 50 m Freestyle 4
Silver medal – second place	1972 Heidelberg	Women's 3x25 m Medley 4
Bronze medal – third place	1984 New York / Stoke Mandeville	Women's 50 m Butterfly 4
Bronze medal – third place	1984 New York / Stoke Mandeville	Women's 400 m Freestyle 4
Bronze medal – third place	1984 New York / Stoke Mandeville	Women's 4x50 m Individual Medley 4

Bente Kristine Grønli (born 25 March 1956 in Trondheim - died 20 January 1996) was a Norwegian disability athlete who participated in the Paralympic Winter Games once and Paralympic Summer Games three times for Norway. She has won a total of 10 medals in swimming and ice sledge speed racing. She participated in several sports, but it was swimming that was her favorite. Bente worked as a sport science consultant at the Norwegian Handicap Sports Association for 15 years.

Grønli was paralyzed by Poliomyelitis when she was three years old.

== Honours ==
- Paralympic Summer Games, 1972
  - Silver in swimming, 50 m freestyle technique
  - Silver in swimming, 75 m medley
  - Bronze in swimming, 50 m back
- Paralympic Summer Games, 1976
  - Gold in swimming, 50 m back
- 1980 Winter Paralympics
  - Silver in ice sledge speed racing, 100 m
  - Silver in ice sledge speed racing, 500 m
  - Silver in ice sledge speed racing, 800 m
- Paralympic Summer Games, 1984
  - Bronze in swimming, 50 m butterfly
  - Bronze in swimming, 400 m freestyle technique
  - Bronze in swimming, 200 m medley

At the Paralympic Winter Games in 1980, she won gold in Class 1 wheelchair dance performance together with Thor E. Kleppe. She also had good results in other international competitions in wheelchair dancing.
