= Ice sledge speed racing at the Winter Paralympics =

- Events: 16 (men: 8; women: 8)

Games
- 1976; 1980; 1984; 1988; 1992; 1994; 1998; 2002; 2006; 2010; 2014; 2018; 2022
- Medalists

Ice sledge speed racing was contested at the Winter Paralympic Games from the second Winter Games in 1980, to the 1988 Winter Games, and then at the 1994 and 1998 Winter Games.

The events were held indoors for the first time at the 1994 Paralympics in Lillehammer.

== Events ==
Event	Class	76	80	84	88	92	94	98	02	06	10	Years
1500 m men	Sitting		• •	•	•		•	• •				5
1000 m men	Sitting			•	•		•	• •				4
700 m men	Sitting			•	•							2
500 m men	Sitting		• • •	• •	• •		•	• •				5
300 m men	Sitting			•	•							2
100 m men	Sitting		• • •	• •	• •		•	• •				5
1500 m women	Sitting							• •				1
1000 m women	Sitting			•	•		•	• •				4
800 m women	Sitting		• •									1
700 m women	Sitting			• •	•		•					3
500 m women	Sitting		• •	• •	•		•	• •				5
300 m women	Sitting			•								1
100 m women	Sitting		• •	• •	•		•	• •				5
Total Events			14	16	12		8	16				

== Medal table ==
NPCs in italics no longer compete at the Winter Paralympics

Rank	Nation	Gold	Silver	Bronze	Total
1	Norway (NOR)	48	51	42	141
2	Japan (JPN)	9	12	11	32
3	Finland (FIN)	9	0	3	12
4	Austria (AUT)	4	3	3	10
5	Great Britain (GBR)	0	4	4	8
6	Sweden (SWE)	0	0	3	3
7	Germany (GER)	0	0	1	1
Totals (7 entries)		70	70	67	207

== See also ==
- Speed skating at the Winter Olympics
