= Rolf Johansson =

Swedish Paralympic athlete

Personal information
- Nationality: Sweden
- Born: 21 July 1944 (age 81) Stockholm, Sweden
Medal record
Representing Sweden
Winter Paralympic Games
Ice sledge hockey
Gold medal – first place	1994 Lillehammer	Team competition
Bronze medal – third place	1998 Nagano	Team competition
Men's ice sledge speed racing
Bronze medal – third place	1980 Geilo	100 m - class II
Bronze medal – third place	1980 Geilo	500 m - class II
Wheelchair curling
Bronze medal – third place	2006 Turin	Team competition
Summer Paralympic Games
Men's para athletics
Bronze medal – third place	1972 Heidelberg	100 m wheelchair 4
Gold medal – first place	1976 Toronto	100 m 5
Silver medal – second place	1976 Toronto	4x60 m relay 2-5
Bronze medal – third place	1976 Toronto	Slalom 5
Silver medal – second place	1980 Arnham	100 m 4
Silver medal – second place	1984 Stoke-Mandeville	Slalom 4
Silver medal – second place	1988 Seoul	Slalom 4
Men's wheelchair basketball
Bronze medal – third place	1984 Stoke-Mandeville	Team competition

Rolf Johansson (born 21 July 1944) is a Swedish former Paralympic athlete. He competed in a variety of sports, including athletics, ice sledge speed racing, ice sledge hockey, and wheelchair curling. He has won a total of 11 Paralympic medals.
