= Great Britain at the 1980 Winter Paralympics =

- Flag of the United Kingdom
- IPC code: GBR
- NPC: British Paralympic Association
- Website: www.paralympics.org.uk

in Geilo
- Medals Ranked 11th: Gold 0 Silver 0 Bronze 0 Total 0

Winter Paralympics appearances (overview)
- 1976; 1980; 1984; 1988; 1992; 1994; 1998; 2002; 2006; 2010; 2014; 2018; 2022; 2026

The United Kingdom of Great Britain and Northern Ireland competed at the 1980 Winter Paralympics held in Geilo, Norway. The team was known by it shortened name of Great Britain, for identification purposes. The team did not win any medals during these games.

== See also ==
- Great Britain at the Paralympics
- Great Britain at the 1980 Winter Olympics
