= Lahja Hämäläinen =

Finnish ice sledge speed racer

Sport
- Country: Finland
- Sport: Ice sledge speed racing
Medal record
Women's ice sledge speed racing
Representing Finland
Winter Paralympic Games
Bronze medal – third place	1980 Geilo	100 m - V
Bronze medal – third place	1980 Geilo	500 m - V
Bronze medal – third place	1980 Geilo	800 m - V
Gold medal – first place	1984 Innsbruck	100 m - gr I
Gold medal – first place	1984 Innsbruck	300 m - gr I
Gold medal – first place	1984 Innsbruck	500 m - gr I
Gold medal – first place	1984 Innsbruck	700 m - gr I

Lahja Hämäläinen is a Finnish ice sledge speed racer. She represented Finland at the 1980 Winter Paralympics, at the 1984 Winter Paralympics and at the 1988 Winter Paralympics. In total, she won four gold medals and three bronze medals.

She won three bronze medals in ice sledge speed racing at the 1980 Winter Paralympics in Geilo, Norway and four gold medals in ice sledge speed racing at the 1984 Winter Paralympics in Innsbruck, Austria.
