= Wakako Tsuchida =

Japanese Paralympic wheelchair racer

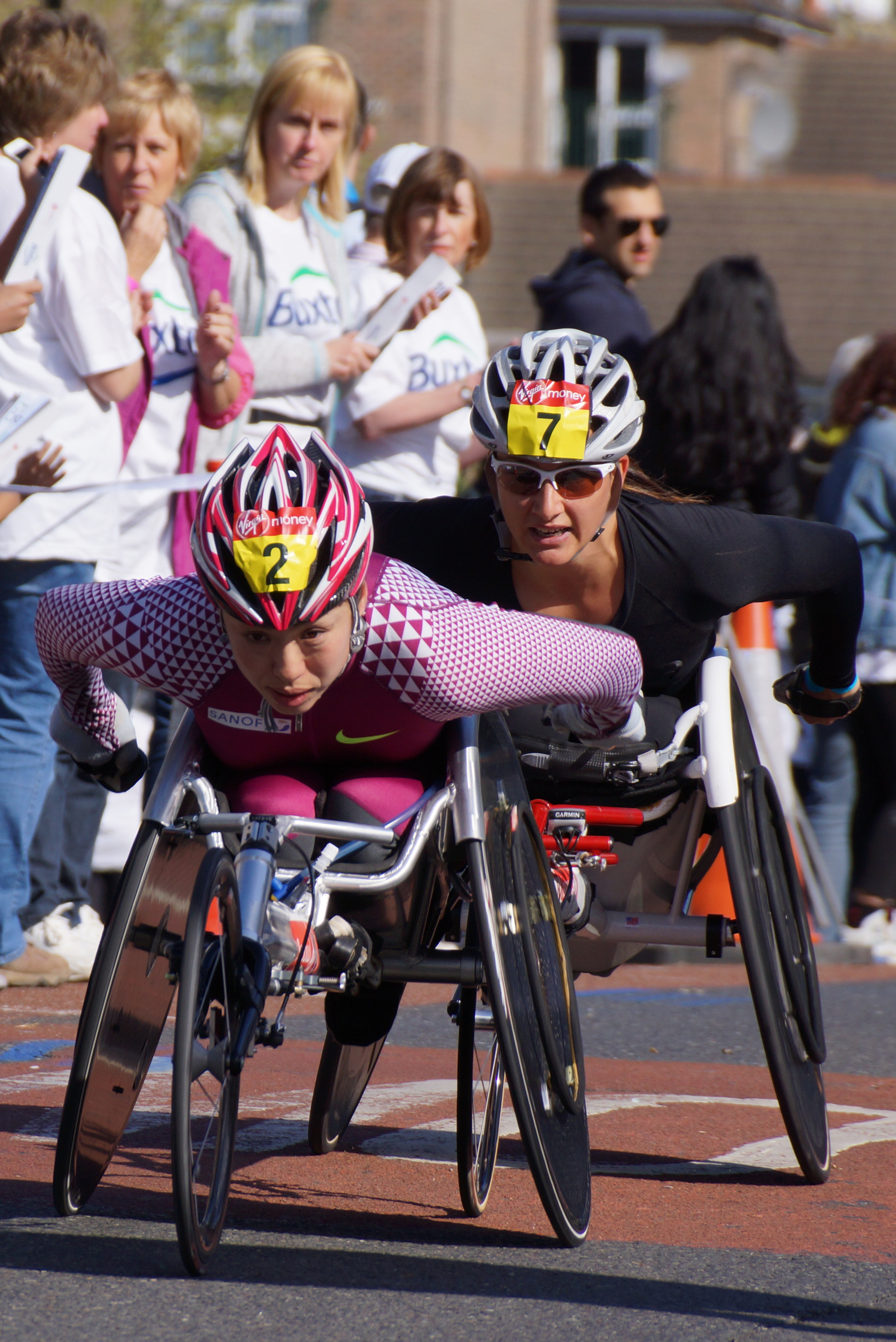
- Tsuchida (front) at the 2014 London Marathon.

Personal information
- Nationality: Japanese
- Born: 15 October 1974 (age 51)

Sport
- Country: Japan
- Sport: Para athletics, Para triathlon
- Disability class: LW11, T54
Medal record
Women's ice sledge racing
Paralympic Games
Gold medal – first place	1998 Nagano	1000 m LW11
Gold medal – first place	1998 Nagano	1500 m LW11
Silver medal – second place	1998 Nagano	100 m LW11
Silver medal – second place	1998 Nagano	400 m LW11
Women's para athletics
Paralympic Games
Gold medal – first place	2004 Athens	5000 m T54
Silver medal – second place	2004 Athens	Marathon T54
Bronze medal – third place	2000 Sydney	Marathon T54
World Championships
Silver medal – second place	2011 Christhchurch	800 m T54
Silver medal – second place	2013 Lyon	Marathon T54
Silver medal – second place	2013 Lyon	1500 m T54
Bronze medal – third place	2011 Christchurch	1500 m T54
Women's paratriathlon
World Championships
Silver medal – second place	2018 Gold Coast	PTWC

Wakako Tsuchida (土田 和歌子, Tsuchida Wakako) (born 15 October 1974) is an athlete from Tokyo, Japan, who is an accomplished women's wheelchair marathoner, ice sledge racer and triathlete. She was the first professional wheelchair athlete from Japan and the first Japanese athlete to win gold medals in both the Summer and Winter Paralympics. She has paraplegia.

== Career ==
She has won the women's wheelchair division of the Boston Marathon five times, in 2007, 2008, 2009, 2010 and 2011; the Honolulu Marathon twice, in 2003 and 2005, the Oita Marathon four times, in 1999, 2001, 2002 and 2003 and the 2010 London Marathon with a time of 1:52:33. She competed at the 2012 Boston Marathon and in a close finish she was one second behind the winner Shirley Reilly.

At the 2000 Summer Paralympics she took a bronze medal in the marathon, while at the 2004 Games she won a gold medal in the 5000 metres and a silver in the marathon. Her personal best is 1:38:32, which she accomplished at the 2001 Oita Marathon.

She competed in ice sledge racing at the Winter Paralympics in 1994 and 1998, winning two golds and two silvers the latter year. She has also won medals in sledge racing's IPC World Championships.

Tsuchida was one of the final torchbearers during the opening ceremonies of the 2020 Summer Olympics.
