= Anna Turney =

British Paralympic alpine skier

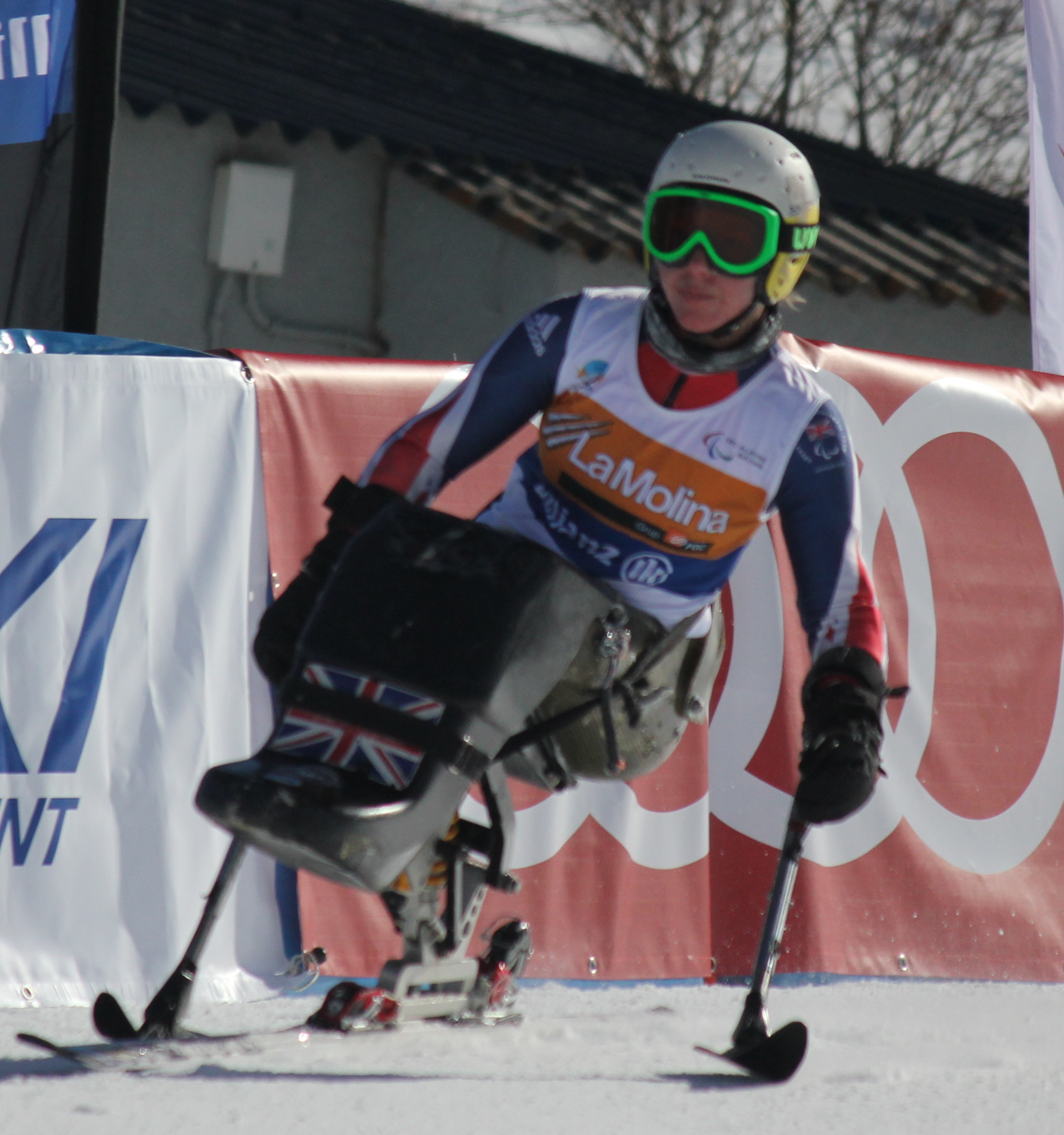
- Turney at the IPC Alpine World Championships in La Molina, Spain

Personal information
- Nationality: British
- Born: 5 July 1979 (age 46)
- Education: Oundle School

Sport
- Country: Great Britain
- Sport: Alpine skiing
- Event(s): Downhill slalom giant slalom Super-G; Super combined

Achievements and titles
- Paralympic finals: 2010 Vancouver; 2014 Sochi

Anna Turney (born 5 July 1979) is a British alpine skier.

== Personal history ==
Turney was born in 1979 in Northampton. She was educated at Oundle. Turney was a promising snowboarder, until an accident on the slopes of Yamagata in Japan left her paralysed from the waist down.

== Skiing career ==
While recovering in hospital from her spinal injuries, Turney decided to get back into sport after being inspired by the 2006 Winter Paralympics in Torino (Turin). The following year she took up monoskiing and in 2007 she was accepted into the British Disabled Ski Team (BDST). Within a year she made her debut for the British team when she made her GB debut at the NORAM races in Canada. The next year Turney was competing at the highest level and was selected for Great Britain the 2009 IPC Alpine Skiing World Championships in South Korea, finishing fourth in the giant slalom.

In 2010 Turney was part of the Great Britain team that travelled to Vancouver to participate in her first Winter Paralympics. Turney stated in a 2014 interview that she was sent to the Games mainly to build her experience, but managed a sixth place in the slalom when ranked 16th. The next year she was back in the Great Britain team, this time at Sestriere in Italy at the 2011 World Championships. Although failing to finish in the sitting slalom, Turney finished fourth in the giant slalom.

In the 2013 World Championship in La Molina, Spain, Turney was entered into four events, but failed to finish any. In 2014, she was selected for ParalympicsGB for the Winter Paralympics in Sochi. She failed to finish in the opening downhill on 8 March, falling on a course which Turney described as "pretty tough". She subsequently finished fourth in the super-G, sixth in the slalom, and eighth in the grand slalom.
