= Matt Lloyd (Paralympian) =

British Paralympian (born 1972)

Matthew Lloyd (born 23 May 1972) is a British Paralympian who was born with spina bifida and two club feet. He has competed in ice sledge hockey at the 2006 Winter Paralympics, in Sitting volleyball at the 2007 European Championships, and is credited with inventing the sport of Inline sledge hockey. He was born in Crawley, Sussex but grew up in Rainhill, Merseyside and later resided in Hollym, East Riding of Yorkshire. After completing a degree in Business Information Systems, Lloyd worked within the music industry, firstly as a journalist and then within the A&R department of a major record label, before going to work extensively within the sports and leisure sectors.

In March 2012 it was announced that Lloyd would be an Olympic torchbearer and would be carrying the Olympic torch through Scarborough.

Lloyd is an alumnus of Gateway College in Leicester and has been honoured by the college who have named an annual community sports award after him. Lloyd has passed his Olympic Torch to the college to inspire students and has a history of supporting grassroots sports as evidenced by his role as Vice Chair of Sport Birmingham, one of the 45 County Sports Partnerships that exist to support sport in England.

In 2015 Lloyd married Ruth Harvey on the ice at the ice rink in Widnes, which is believed to be the first ever wedding on an ice rink in England and Wales.

It was announced in August 2016 that Lloyd was launching a brand of skating rinks called SK8Z with the first one based in Gainsborough, Lincolnshire and which utilised a type of roller skate which replicated ice skates without the need for ice. It was announced in 2017 that due to a senior manager experiencing health issues the rink would close.

Lloyd is formerly the Vice Chair of Sport Birmingham and a Director of Greycat Associates. In 2019 Lloyd was added to the board of Drake Music, a national music charity specialising in disability, music and technology. but has since left both Sport Birmingham and Drake Music.

Since 2021 Lloyd has been studying towards a PhD in Systems Science at the University of Hull where he is also a trustee of the student Union and he is now regarded as an academic within the field of systems thinking, having published papers in academic journals and he is also the Chair of the Systems Thinking Special Interest Group at Operational Research Society. Lloyd also teaches on the Universities Global Master of Business Administration degree.

== Sledge hockey ==
In 2004 Lloyd took up the sport of sledge hockey (a variant of ice hockey and a Paralympic sport) playing for the Kingston Kestrels Sledge hockey team. Lloyd was asked to train with the British Paralympic team early in 2005. In November 2005 Lloyd made his international debut as back-up goalkeeper against Italy in the Paralympic Qualifiers in Turin, Italy. Lloyd represented Great Britain at the 2006 Winter Paralympics in Turin, the 2009 IPC Ice Sledge Hockey World Championships and the 2011 IPC Ice Sledge Hockey European Championships.

Lloyd is a founding member of the Grimsby Red Wings Sledge hockey team.

== Sitting volleyball ==
In May 2007 Lloyd was approached to play the sport of Sitting volleyball, a version of traditional volleyball played by athletes with a disability. Due to an injury within the team and Lloyd's Paralympic experience, he made his debut for the Great Britain Sitting volleyball team in an international friendly against the Netherlands in June 2007. Lloyd was selected for the GB Sitting volleyball squad that competed in the European Championships that were held in Hungary in September 2007.

== Inline sledge hockey ==
In October 2005 Lloyd became chairperson of the British Sledge Hockey Association. Despite a British team competing in the 2006 Winter Paralympics, it was apparent that Ice sledge hockey was on the decline in the United Kingdom. To reverse the trend, Lloyd came up with the idea of Inline sledge hockey: essentially, Ice sledge hockey but played with sledges with wheels instead of skate runners. Although sledges with wheels had been invented by Laurie Howlett of Unique Inventions and used in both Canada and Germany as training aids, Lloyd was the first person to recognise that the equipment could be used to develop a distinct sport.

The first "official" game of Inline Sledge Hockey was played in December 2009 in Bisley, Surrey. Inline Sledge Hockey is recognised as a sport by the British Roller Sports Federation and a full set of rules was drawn up in early 2010 by Geoff Gooding based on Inline Puck Hockey rules with the first Inline Sledge Hockey league due to be launched in October 2010 in the UK.

== Ice hockey ==
In May 2013 it was announced that Lloyd had been appointed chairman of the newly formed Widnes Wild ice hockey club, which plays in the English National Hockey League. Lloyd stood down from his role at the Widnes Wild in June 2022 in order to take a role as a Director of the English Ice Hockey Association where he was responsible for Junior and Recreational ice hockey. but has since left.

== Additional information ==
Inline Sledge Hockey feature

IPC European Championships Article 2011

Peterborough Phantoms Interview 2011

Banners on the Wall Article

== See also ==
- Great Britain at the 2006 Winter Paralympics
