= Ice sledge speed racing at the 1998 Winter Paralympics =

Ice sledge speed racing at the 1998 Winter Paralympics consisted of sixteen events, eight for men and eight for women.

== Medal table ==
Rank	Nation	Gold	Silver	Bronze	Total
1	Japan	9	12	11	32
2	Norway	7	4	5	16
Totals (2 entries)		16	16	16	48

=== Men's events ===
Event	Gold	Silver	Bronze
100 m LW10	Yutaka Takeda; Japan	Akio Okuhara; Japan	Uno Frantzen; Norway
100 m LW11	Knut Lundstrøm; Norway	Yoshihisa Yamaguchi; Japan	Lars Andresen; Norway
500 m LW10	Yutaka Takeda; Japan	Uno Frantzen; Norway	Akio Okuhara; Japan
500 m LW11	Knut Lundstrøm; Norway	Tadashi Kato; Japan	Yoshihisa Yamaguchi; Japan
1000 m LW10	Yutaka Takeda; Japan	Uno Frantzen; Norway	Toshiki Watanabe; Japan
1000 m LW11	Knut Lundstrøm; Norway	Tadashi Kato; Japan	Hiroyuki Nakamura; Japan
1500 m LW10	Toshiki Watanabe; Japan	Yutaka Takeda; Japan	Uno Frantzen; Norway
1500 m LW11	Knut Lundstrøm; Norway	Hiroyuki Nakamura; Japan	Tadashi Kato; Japan

=== Women's events ===
Event	Gold	Silver	Bronze
100 m LW10	Tone Edvardsen; Norway	Miki Matsue; Japan	Yoshie Kanai; Japan
100 m LW11	Anne Mette Samdal; Norway	Wakako Tsuchida; Japan	Kyoko Okuyama; Japan
500 m LW10	Miki Matsue; Japan	Tone Edvardsen; Norway	Yoshie Kanai; Japan
500 m LW11	Anne Mette Samdal; Norway	Wakako Tsuchida; Japan	Kyoko Okuyama; Japan
1000 m LW10	Miki Matsue; Japan	Tone Edvardsen; Norway	Yoshie Kanai; Japan
1000 m LW11	Wakako Tsuchida; Japan	Kyoko Okuyama; Japan	Lene Tystad; Norway
1500 m LW10	Miki Matsue; Japan	Yoshie Kanai; Japan	Tone Edvardsen; Norway
1500 m LW11	Wakako Tsuchida; Japan	Kyoko Okuyama; Japan	Akemi Kuwahara; Japan
