= Miki Matheson =

Japanese Paralympic ice sledge speed racer

Miki Matsue Matheson (松江美季) is a three time Paralympic gold medalist in Ice sledge speed racing at the Winter Paralympics. A car accident led to her disability. Currently she lives in Canada with her husband, former Paralympic ice sledge hockey player Shawn Matheson.
