= Matthew Stockford =

British para-alpine skier

Medal record

Paralympic alpine skiing

Representing Great Britain

Winter Paralympic Games
Bronze medal – third place	1992 Albertville/Tignes	Downhill LW10
Bronze medal – third place	1992 Albertville/Tignes	Giant slalom LW10
Bronze medal – third place	1992 Albertville/Tignes	Super-G LW10
Bronze medal – third place	1994 Lillehammer	Super-G LWX

Matthew Stockford is a British former Paralympic skier who won medals at the 1992 Winter Paralympics and 1994 Winter Paralympics. Stockford broke his back in a skiing accident in 1985. He competed using a monoski – a specially fitted chair over a single ski that includes seat belts and other strapping, as well as a suspension device to minimise wear and tear on the skier's body.

== Skiing career ==
In his first competitive event after his accident, The 1990 World Disabled Ski Championships, Stockford won a gold medal in the downhill and bronze in the slalom.

=== Paralympics ===
Stockford first competed at the Winter Paralympics during the 1992 Games held in Tignes and Albertville, France. He took part in four alpine skiing events, downhill, giant slalom, super-G and slalom, in the LW10 classification for athletes who race sitting down. He won three bronze medals in the downhill, super-G and giant slalom events. After Stockford won the bronze in downhill, the British delegation filed a protest claiming that the two American skiers ahead of him should not have been in the LW10 category. The medical committee rejected the protest on the grounds that all classifications had been determined at the start of the competition. In the slalom Stockford finished fourth, missing out on a medal by one position and 10.65 seconds.

At the 1994 Winter Paralympics in Lillehammer, Norway, Stockford again competed in downhill, giant slalom, super-G and slalom events in a classification now renamed as LWX. He failed to finish in the downhill slalom or giant slalom but picked up his fourth Paralympic bronze medal in the super-G. Since this bronze, and the four others won by British athletes in Lillehammer, Britain has failed to win any Paralympic alpine skiing medals.

Stockford now runs a successful property business in London. In 2006 Stockford became the manager of British Olympic skier Chemmy Alcott after meeting her sister-in-law's father at a party. He helped Alcott set up a team of support staff and raise funding from private sources with the aim of winning a medal at the 2010 Winter Olympics in Vancouver.

== Climate Change Denial ==
Matthew believes that anthropological climate change is a global scam and that the Paris Accords are set up to transfer manufacturing "from the west to the east".

== See also ==
- Great Britain at the 1992 Winter Paralympics
- Great Britain at the 1994 Winter Paralympics
- Alpine skiing at the 1992 Winter Paralympics
- Alpine skiing at the 1994 Winter Paralympics
