= Ari Mustonen =

Finnish cross-country skier

Sport
- Country: Finland
- Sport: Cross-country skiing
Medal record
Men's cross-country skiing
Representing Finland
Paralympic Games
Bronze medal – third place	1984 Innsbruck	Short Distance 5 km LW2

Ari Mustonen is a Finnish cross-country skier. He represented Finland at the 1984 Winter Paralympics held in Innsbruck, Austria. He won the bronze medal at the men's short distance 5 km LW2 event.
