= Gateway College =

Location
- Colin Grundy Drive; Hamilton, Leicester, LE5 1GA; England; 52.6517°N 1.0751°W

Information
- Type: FE college
- Local authority: Leicester
- Principal: James Bagley
- Gender: Coeducational
- Age: 16+
- Website: gateway.ac.uk

Gateway Sixth Form College is a sixth form college in Hamilton, Leicester, England.

The college used to be housed in the city centre of Leicester, adjacent to the main campus of De Montfort University and located by other buildings of academic interests such as the Daniel Lambert Museum, Newarke House, Leicester Castle and Castle Gardens. The bridge from where the dead body of Richard III was said to have been thrown from is also a short walk from the original site. It has since moved to a new, £33 million campus built in the Hamilton suburb of the city.

== History ==
The school began as Gateway Grammar School for boys. It was founded in 1928 and located in Skeffington House which is now the home of the Newarke Houses Museum. The school was established primarily to feed the Colleges of Art and Technology (later Leicester Polytechnic and now De Montfort University) and the curriculum showed a significant bias towards Craft and other practical subjects.

In 1933 it moved across the road to the site it occupied until 2009, which comprised a three-storey house dating from 1772 with a purpose-built extension and additional buildings for science, and art and design.

Its first head master (1928–1931) was Harold Dent who went on to become editor of The Times Educational Supplement and professor of education at the University of Sheffield. Dent was succeeded by E C White (1931–1952) and then Hyman Frazer (1952–1971), whose granddaughter Lucy Frazer became a UK Cabinet minister in 2023. In Frazer's time the Gateway (as it was known by locals) became more like a conventional grammar school but retained its commitment to teaching crafts. It was also progressive in its acceptance of 11+ exam "failures" at 13+ and 15+, some of whom achieved distinction and are among those listed in alumni below. M H Bailey (1971–1990) saw the school through its transformation into a mixed sixth form college in 1976. After Bailey's retirement the college principals were A Sortwell (1990–1997), N A Goffin (1997–2009), S Overton-Edwards (2009–2016). The current principal is J Bagley.

Gateway joined Better Futures Multi Academy Trust in April 2019.

== Courses ==
The student body consists of approximately 1,200 students aged 16–18 and 400 adult students.

== Alumni ==
- Matt Lloyd, ice sledge hockey Paralympian, who has been honoured by the college who have named an annual community sports award after him.
- Claudia Webbe, Independent MP

=== Gateway Technical Grammar School ===
- Sir Damon Buffini, head of private equity firm Permira
- Greg Clarke, chairman of the FA from 2016 to 2020 and Chairman of the Football League, 2010–2016; CEO of the Lendlease, 2002–2009; CEO of Cable & Wireless, 1999-2000
- Malcolm Clarke (composer), of the BBC Radiophonic Workshop, who composed music for Doctor Who in the early 1980s
- Harold Hopkins, physicist; developed the zoom lens; did significant work on fibre-optics
- Henry Lowther, jazz and classical trumpet player
- Tony Selvidge, original keyboard play of prog rock band Yes (as Tony Kaye)
- Tom Rand, Oscar-nominated costume designer, The French Lieutenant's Woman
- Colin Wilson, writer

== See also ==
- Regent College, Leicester
- Wyggeston and Queen Elizabeth I College
