= Ice sledge speed racing at the 1980 Winter Paralympics =

Ice sledge speed racing at the II Paralympic Winter Games

Ice sledge speed racing at the 1980 Winter Paralympics consisted of fourteen events, eight for men and six for women.

== Medal table ==
Rank	Nation	Gold medal	Silver medal	Bronze medal	Total
1	Norway (NOR)	12	14	6	32
2	Finland (FIN)	2	0	3	5
3	Sweden (SWE)	0	0	3	3
Total		14	14	12	40

== Medal summary ==
The competition events were:

- 100 m: men - women
- 500 m: men - women
- 800 m: - women
- 1500 m: men

Each event had separate sitting classifications:

- Men
  - I - sitting: paraplegia with fair functional sitting balance
  - II - sitting: paraplegia with fair functional sitting balance
  - III - sitting: paraplegia with no or some upper abdominal function and no functional sitting balance
- Women
  - IV - sitting: paraplegia with fair functional sitting balance
  - V - sitting: paraplegia with no or some upper abdominal function and no functional sitting balance

=== Men's events ===
Event	Class	Gold	Silver	Bronze
100 m	I	Erik Sandbraaten; Norway	Rolf Einar Øyen; Norway	Bengt-Gösta Johansson; Sweden
100 m	II	Vidar Johnsen; Norway	Karl Henrik Seemann; Norway	Rolf Johansson; Sweden
100 m	III	Veikko Puputti; Finland	Olav Geir Kirkebo; Norway	None
500 m	I	Erik Sandbraaten; Norway	Rolf Einar Øyen; Norway	Paul Jacobsen; Norway
500 m	II	Vidar Johnsen; Norway	Karl Henrik Seemann; Norway	Rolf Johansson; Sweden
500 m	III	Veikko Puputti; Finland	Olav Geir Kirkebo; Norway	None
1500 m	I	Rolf Einar Øyen; Norway	Paul Jacobsen; Norway	Erik Sandbraaten; Norway
1500 m	II	Karl Henrik Seemann; Norway	Vidar Johnsen; Norway	Egil Johnsen; Norway

=== Women's events ===
Event	Class	Gold	Silver	Bronze
100 m	IV	Britt Mjaasund Øyen; Norway	Sylva Olsen; Norway	Karin Endsjø Hansen; Norway
100 m	V	Kari Aronsen; Norway	Bente Grønli; Norway	Lahja Hämäläinen; Finland
500 m	IV	Britt Mjaasund Øyen; Norway	Sylva Olsen; Norway	Karin Endsjø Hansen; Norway
500 m	V	Kari Aronsen; Norway	Bente Grønli; Norway	Lahja Hämäläinen; Finland
800 m	IV	Britt Mjaasund Øyen; Norway	Karin Endsjø Hansen; Norway	Sylva Olsen; Norway
800 m	V	Kari Aronsen; Norway	Bente Grønli; Norway	Lahja Hämäläinen; Finland

== See also ==
- Speed skating at the 1980 Winter Olympics
