= Ice sledge speed racing at the 1994 Winter Paralympics =

Speed racing at the 1994 Winter Paralympics

Ice sledge speed racing at the 1994 Winter Paralympics consisted of eight events, four for men and four for women.

Athletes from seven countries (Norway, Austria, Canada, Estonia, Iceland, Japan and the Netherlands) took part and Norway pulled off an almost complete clean sweep of the medals, winning all eight gold medals, all eight silver, and seven of the eight bronze - with the sole other going to Austria.

== Medal table ==
Rank	Nation	Gold	Silver	Bronze	Total
1	Norway (NOR)	8	8	7	23
2	Austria (AUT)	0	0	1	1
Totals (2 entries)		8	8	8	24

== Medal summary ==
=== Men's events ===
Event	Gold	Silver	Bronze
Men's 100 m LW10-11	Lars Andresen; Norway	Knut Lundstrøm; Norway	Felix Karl; Austria
Men's 500 m LW10-11	Lars Andresen; Norway	Atle Haglund; Norway	Knut Lundstrøm; Norway
Men's 1000 m LW10-11	Atle Haglund; Norway	Knut Lundstrøm; Norway	Lars Andresen; Norway
Men's 1500 m LW10-11	Atle Haglund; Norway	Knut Lundstrøm; Norway	Lars Andresen; Norway

=== Women's events ===
Event	Gold	Silver	Bronze
Women's 100 m LW10-11	Britt Mjaasund Øyen; Norway	Ragnhild Myklebust; Norway	Evy Gundersen; Norway
Women's 500 m LW10-11	Britt Mjaasund Øyen; Norway	Ragnhild Myklebust; Norway	Kirsti Hoøen; Norway
Women's 700 m LW10-11	Ragnhild Myklebust; Norway	Kirsti Hoøen; Norway	Britt Mjaasund Øyen; Norway
Women's 1000 m LW10-11	Kirsti Hoøen; Norway	Britt Mjaasund Øyen; Norway	Ragnhild Myklebust; Norway
