= Denise Smith =

British wheelchair racer

Denise Jacqueline Smith MBE
Personal information
- Nationality: British
- Born: United Kingdom

Sport
- Country: Great Britain
- Sport: Ice sledge speed racing
Medal record
Women's ice sledge speed racing
Representing Great Britain
Winter Paralympic Games
Silver medal – second place	1984 Innsbruck	100 m - gr I
Silver medal – second place	1984 Innsbruck	300 m - gr I
Silver medal – second place	1984 Innsbruck	500 m - gr I
London Marathon
Gold medal – first place	1983 London	Women's

Denise Jacqueline Smith MBE (1954-2020) was a British wheelchair athlete. A Paralympian and longtime wheelchair athlete, Smith won the inaugural London Marathon wheelchair race in a time of 4:29:03. She competed in ice sledge speed racing at the 1984 Winter Paralympics and won three silver medals in the 100, 300, and 500 metre grade I events.

Smith was the Sunday Times Sportswoman of the Year 1990.

Smith was appointed Member of the Order of the British Empire (MBE) in the 1993 New Year Honours for service to sport for disabled people.
