= Ice sledge speed racing at the 1984 Winter Paralympics =

Ice sledge speed racing at the 1984 Winter Paralympics consisted of 16 events, 8 for men and 8 for women.

== Medal table ==
Rank	Nation	Gold	Silver	Bronze	Total
1	Norway	9	10	11	30
2	Finland	7	0	0	7
3	Great Britain	0	4	4	8
4	Austria	0	1	0	1
Totals (4 entries)		16	15	15	46

== Medal summary ==
=== Men's events ===
Event	Gold	Silver	Bronze
100 m gr I	Per Knudsen; Norway	Terje Roel; Norway	Ken Robertson; Great Britain
100 m gr II	Erik Sandbraaten; Norway	Atle Haglund; Norway	Rolf Einar Øyen; Norway
300 m gr I	Veikko Puputti; Finland	Ken Robertson; Great Britain	Per Knudsen; Norway
500 m gr I	Veikko Puputti; Finland	Terje Roel; Norway	Per Knudsen; Norway
500 m gr II	Karl Henrik Seemann; Norway	Erik Sandbraaten; Norway	Rolf Einar Øyen; Norway
700 m gr I	Veikko Puputti; Finland	Per Knudsen; Norway	Emil Holten; Norway
1000 m gr II	Atle Haglund; Norway	Rolf Einar Øyen; Norway	Erik Sandbraaten; Norway
1500 m gr II	Rolf Einar Øyen; Norway	Reinhold Wessely; Austria	Erik Sandbraaten; Norway

=== Women's events ===
Event	Gold	Silver	Bronze
100 m gr I	Lahja Hämäläinen; Finland	Denise Smith; Great Britain	Ann Peskey; Great Britain
100 m gr II	Britt Mjaasund Øyen; Norway	Sylva Olsen; Norway	Karin Endsjø; Norway
300 m gr I	Lahja Hämäläinen; Finland	Denise Smith; Great Britain	Ann Peskey; Great Britain
500 m gr I	Lahja Hämäläinen; Finland	Denise Smith; Great Britain	Ann Peskey; Great Britain
500 m gr II	Britt Mjaasund Øyen; Norway	Karin Endsjø; Norway	Sylva Olsen; Norway
700 m gr I	Lahja Hämäläinen; Finland	None	None
700 m gr II	Britt Mjaasund Øyen; Norway	Karin Endsjø; Norway	Sylva Olsen; Norway
1000 m gr II	Karin Endsjø; Norway	Britt Mjaasund Øyen; Norway	Sylva Olsen; Norway
