= Mike Brace =

British paralympic skier (born 1950)

Personal information
- Full name: Michael Thomas Brace CBE
- Born: 19 June 1950 (age 76)
- Education: Linden Lodge School
- Spouse: Maureen Browne (1972-present)
- Brace's voice recorded 2012, as part of an audio description of the ArcelorMittal Orbit for VocalEyes

Sport
- Sport: Skiing
- Updated on 15 January 2014

Michael Thomas Brace CBE DL (born 19 June 1950) is a former paralympic skier, social worker and leader of disabled charities. He was Chief Executive of Vision 2020 UK (2001-2012) and served as Chairman of the British Paralympic Association (2001-2008). He was blinded at the age of ten by an accident with a firework and subsequently attended Linden Lodge School for the Blind in Wimbledon. He gained a Diploma in Social Work from the Polytechnic of North London in 1976 and in the same year competed as a cross-country skier in the inaugural Winter Paralympics.

Brace published the first volume of his autobiography Where there's a will in 1980. He published the second volume in 2017, precised on his official web site. He was awarded the OBE in 2005 and CBE in 2009 for services to paralympic sport.

He was the subject of This Is Your Life in 1982 when he was surprised by Eamonn Andrews outside Bush House in London.
