= Russell Docker =

British para-alpine skier

Russell Docker (born 15 May 1967) is a British Paralympic skier. Docker was paralysed from the chest down after he broke two vertebrae in his back in a five-metre fall while on a skiing holiday in 1995. He has competed at three Winter Paralympic Games, his best finish was a 23rd place in 2006.

== Early life and accident ==
Docker was born in Poole, Dorset and attended school in Blandford. He trained as an electrician for three years, then as a ceramic tiler before running his own business for five years. He took up skiing at the age of 18 years. In 1995 whilst skiing in Avoriaz, France he was walking across a bridge when the snow collapsed, causing him to fall five meters. He broke two vertebrae in his back, causing damage to his spinal cord which left him paralysed. Following his accident Docker took up skiing again using a sit-ski, also known as a mono-ski, which features a chair mounted on a single ski, with two short crutches for support.

== Paralympics ==
His first Paralympic appearance came at the 2002 Winter Paralympics held in Salt Lake City, Utah, United States where he was one of two British athletes to compete. He participated in four events in the LW12 classification but crashed out in the downhill event and failed to complete his other three races. Docker was selected for his second Paralympics in 2006; he again competed in four events and achieved a highest finish of 23rd in the Super-G.

Docker's preparations for the 2010 Winter Paralympics in Vancouver were hindered by both the financial problems and eventual collapse of governing body SnowsportGB in the run up to the Games and a hairline fracture in his foot, which he suffered after dropping a medicine ball on it in training. At the Games he was disqualified in the downhill and failed to finish in the slalom and giant slalom following falls. The only race he completed was Super-G, where he placed 29th.

== Other events ==
At the 2004 World Championships Docker finished 6th in downhill, 12th in Super-G and 15th in slalom. A year later he won a gold medal in the Super-G event at the European Cup Final in Austria. In the 2009 World Cup he finished 17th in downhill and 15th in Super-Combined at the event in Sestriere and finished 15th in Super-Combined in Whistler. Docker won a bronze medal in the Super-G at the 2009 European Cup Final in Jasna, Slovakia.
