= Richard Burt (skier) =

British former Paralympic skier

Medal record

Men's para-alpine skiing

Representing Great Britain

Winter Paralympic Games
Silver medal – second place	1992 Albertville/Tignes	Giant slalom B3
Bronze medal – third place	1992 Albertville/Tignes	Super-G B3
Bronze medal – third place	1994 Lillehammer	Giant slalom B3
Bronze medal – third place	1994 Lillehammer	Super-G B3

Richard Burt is a British former Paralympic skier who won medals at the 1992 Winter Paralympics and 1994 Winter Paralympics.

== Paralympics ==
Burt's first appearance at the Winter Paralympics was during the 1992 Games held in Tignes and Albertville, France. He competed in the giant slalom and super-G events in the B3 classification. Burt competed in the B3 classification for visually impaired athletes. In the super-G Burt won a bronze medal, finishing behind Bruno Oberhammer of Italy and the United States' Brian Santos. In the giant slalom Burt recorded a time less than half a second quicker than Oberhammer to win the silver medal, the gold was again won by Santos.

At the 1994 Winter Paralympics, held in Lillehammer, Norway, Burt competed in the downhill and slalom events as well as the super-G and giant slalom. The gold medals in all four events went to Brian Santos and all four silvers were won by Bruno Oberhammer. Burt won two bronze medals, in the giant slalom and super-G, but failed to finish his other events.

Prior to the 1998 Winter Paralympics in Nagano, Japan, Burt, and other members of the British team, experienced difficulties in obtaining funding for their training. In 1996 UK Sport, which replaced the Sports Council of Great Britain, became responsible for distributing National Lottery grant money. A delay in the arrival of lottery funding meant athletes such as Burt were forced to bridge the gap using their own savings. Eventually Burt received around £6000 of funding only a few months before the start of the Games. Competing in his third and final Paralympics Burt contested four events in Nagano, achieving a best result of fifth place in both the downhill and slalom.
