= Peter Young (skier) =

British skier

Personal information
- Nationality: British

Sport
- Country: United Kingdom
- Sport: Cross-country skiing
Medal record
Men's cross-country skiing
Representing Great Britain
Winter Paralympics
Bronze medal – third place	1984 Innsbruck	Men's 10km
Bronze medal – third place	1994 Lillehammer	Men's 5km

Peter Young is a former British cross-country skier and seven time Paralympian. He won two medals in cross-country skiing for Britain in 1984 and 1994. He is the only British person in the Olympics or Paralympics to have won a medal in cross-country skiing.
