= Ice sledge racing =

Paralympic sport

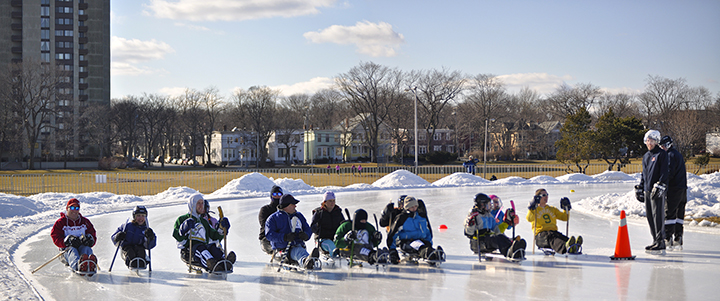

Ice sledge racing is a Paralympic sport where contestants use a lightweight sledge and propel themselves using two poles. As a modern organized sport, it was available as an Paralympic sport between 1980–1988 and 1994–1998.

It is contested using a speed skating rink with a 400 meters (1,300 ft) circumference. The sport is contested in 100 metre, 500 metre, 700 metre, 1,000 metre, and 1,500 metre distances. A speed skating rink (or speed skating oval) is an ice rink (a specific type of sport venue) in which a speed skating competition is held.

== History ==
This sport is seven-centuries-old. An ice sledge racing sled must be moved with sticks. In the past these sleds were made of wood with beautiful paintings. Today they are often made of aluminum or iron. There are several types of sleds, namely the sitting sled, the kneeling sled, the steering sled, and the ice sledge hockey sled.

== Paralympic program inclusion ==
In 1980 with the Paralympic winter games in Geilo, Norway, ice sledge racing became a Paralympic sport. After the 1998 winter games in Nagano, ice sledge racing disappeared from the Paralympic program again. Despite the fact that the sport has been Paralympic, only mixed competitions are held in the Netherlands, because able-bodied and disabled athletes both compete in ice sledge racing together.

The events were held indoors for the first time at the 1994 Paralympics in Lillehammer.

== See also ==
- Ice sledge speed racing at the Winter Paralympics
- Sledge hockey, a sport that uses the same sledge and sticks in a different manner.
