= British Paralympic Association =

National Paralympic Committee of the United Kingdom

National Paralympic Committee
- Country: Great Britain
- Code: GBR
- Created: 1989
- Continental association: EPC
- President: Nick Webborn, CBE
- Website: paralympics.org.uk

The British Paralympic Association (BPA) is the National Paralympic Committee for Great Britain (GBR), and is responsible for the United Kingdom's participation in the Paralympic Games.

The BPA select, prepare, enter, fund and manage the Great Britain and Northern Ireland team at the Paralympic Games. This team is known as ParalympicsGB.

== Structure ==
- Chief Executive Officer: David P Clarke, OBE
- Chair: Nick Webborn, CBE

== Arms ==
Coat of arms of British Paralympic Association
Notes Adopted 27 April 2016 Crest On a Helm with a Wreath Argent, Gules and Azure: Within a Coronet comprising a Rim set with six Batons erect Or between Roundels alternately of Silver Gold and Bronze proper a Lion statant guardant Gules crowned with a Laurel Wreath the dexter forepaw raised and holding a Torch enflamed Or. Escutcheon Quarterly Gules and Azure two Leeks in pale that in base reversed and conjoined at the fess point to two Thistles in fess two Roses in bend and two Flax Flowers in bend sinister all with heads outwards and slipped and leaved Or the whole enfiling four Links of Chain interlaced in a square Argent. Supporters On either side a Lion guardant that on the dexter Azure that on the sinister Gules each crowned with a Laurel Wreath and holding in the exterior forepaw a Torch enflamed Or both upon a Compartment comprising a Grassy Mount Vert. Motto IUNCTI IN UNO

== See also ==
- Great Britain at the Paralympics
- British Olympic Association
