= List of multiple Paralympic gold medalists at a single Games =

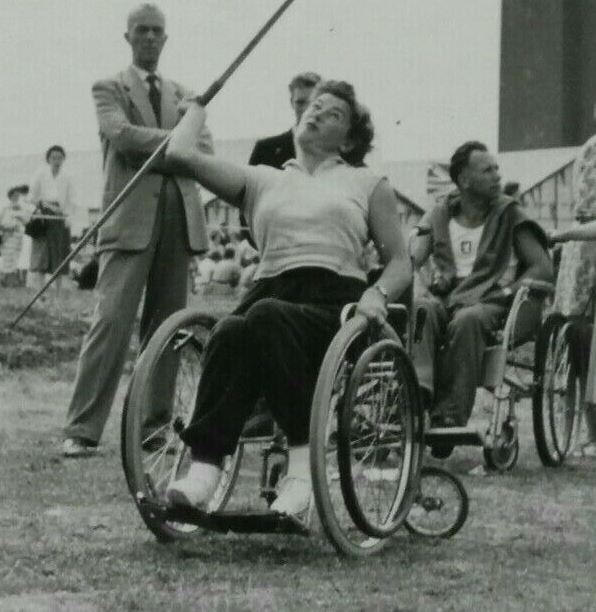
Anna Maria Toso, ten medals won at Tokyo 1964.

== List of most gold medals won at a single Paralympic Games ==
This is a list of gold medallists with four or more gold medals won in a single Paralympic Games, or the gold medallist with the highest number of gold medals won at a Paralympic Games, including Team Events.

Rank	Athlete	Nation	Sport	Year	Game	Sex	Gold	Silver	Bronze	Total
	Trischa Zorn	United States	Swimming	1988	Summer	F	12	0	0	12
	Maria Scutti	Italy	Multiple	1960	Summer	F	10	3	2	15
	Roberto Marson	Italy	Multiple	1968	Summer	M	10	2	1	13
	John Morgan	United States	Swimming	1992	Summer	M	8	2	0	10
	Jacqueline Freney	Australia	Swimming	2012	Summer	F	8	0	0	8
	Bart Dodson	United States	Athletics	1992	Summer	M	8	0	0	8
	Mayumi Narita	Japan	Swimming	2004	Summer	F	7	0	1	8
	Marijke Ruiter	Netherlands	Swimming	1976	Summer	F	7	0	0	7
	Michael Edgson	Canada	Swimming	1988	Summer	M	7	0	0	7
	Knut Lundstrøm	Norway	Multiple	1988	Winter	M	7	0	0	7
	Elizabeth Scott	United States	Swimming	1992	Summer	F	7	0	0	7
	Béatrice Hess	France	Swimming	2000	Summer	F	7	0	0	7
	Jiang Yuyan	China	Swimming	2024	Summer	F	7	0	0	7
	Erin Popovich	United States	Swimming	2004	Summer	F	7	0	0	7
	Franz Nietlispach	Switzerland	Athletics	1988	Summer	M	6	2	0	8
	Magdalena Tjernberg	Sweden	Swimming	1988	Summer	F	6	2	0	8
	Martha Gustafson	Canada	Multiple	1984	Summer	F	6	1	0	7
	Christopher Holmes	Great Britain	Swimmer	1992	Summer	M	6	1	0	7
	Ed Owen	United States	Multiple	1968	Summer	M	6	0	1	7
	Ingrid Lauridsen	Denmark	Athletics	1984	Summer	F	6	0	1	7
	Joseph Wengier	Israel	Swimming	1976	Summer	M	6	0	1	7
	Ron Stein	United States	Multiple	1964	Summer	M	6	0	0	6
	Uri Bergman	Israel	Swimming	1976	Summer	M	6	0	0	6
	Claudia Hengst	West Germany	Swimming	1988	Summer	F	6	0	0	6
	Siobhan Paton	Australia	Swimming	2000	Summer	F	6	0	0	6
	Ihar Boki	Belarus	Swimming	2016	Summer	M	6	0	0	6
	Anna Maria Toso	Italy	Athletics, Swimming, Fencing, Table tennis	1964	Summer	F	5	5	0	10
	Ragnhild Myklebust	Norway	Multiple	1988	Winter	F	5	1	0	6
	Mike Kenny	Great Britain	Swimming	1984	Summer	M	5	1	0	6
	Matthew Cowdrey	Australia	Swimming	2008	Summer	M	5	3	0	8
	Matthew Cowdrey	Australia	Swimming	2012	Summer	M	5	2	1	8
	Stéphanie Dixon	Canada	Swimming	2000	Summer	F	5	2	0	7
	Zipora Rubin-Rosenbaum	Israel	Athletics, Wheelchair basketball, Swimming	1968	Summer	M	5	2	0	7
	Priya Cooper	Australia	Swimming	1996	Summer	F	5	1	1	7
	Siegmar Henker	West Germany	Multiple	1984	Summer	M	5	1	0	6
	Natalie du Toit	South Africa	Swimming	2004	Summer	M	5	1	0	6
	Ihar Boki	Belarus	Swimming	2012	Summer	M	5	1	0	6
	Catherine Debrunner	Switzerland	Athletics	2024	Summer	F	5	1	0	6
	Stefano Raimondi	Italy	Swimming	2024	Summer	M	5	1	0	6
	Brit Mjaasund Oejen	Norway	Multiple	1980	Winter	F	5	0	0	5
	Arkadiusz Pawlowski	Poland	Swimming	1984	Summer	M	5	0	0	5
	Erling Trondsen	Norway	Swimming	1984	Summer	M	5	0	0	5
	Chantal Petitclerc	Canada	Athletics	2004	Summer	F	5	0	0	5
	Hong Yan Zhu	China	Swimming	2000	Summer	F	5	0	0	5
	Tim Sullivan	Australia	Athletics	2000	Summer	M	5	0	0	5
	Erin Popovich	United States	Swimming	2004	Summer	F	5	0	0	5
	Lauren Woolstencroft	Canada	Skiing	2010	Winter	F	5	0	0	5
	Verena Bentele	Germany	Multiple	2010	Winter	F	5	0	0	5
	Anna Schaffelhuber	Germany	Skiing	2014	Winter	F	5	0	0	5
	Ihar Boki	Belarus	Swimming	2020	Summer	M	5	0	0	5
	Ihar Boki	Neutral Paralympic Athletes	Swimming	2024	Summer	M	5	0	0	5
	Daniel Dias	Brazil	Swimming	2008	Summer	M	4	4	1	9
	Josefina Cornejo	Mexico	Multiple	1980	Summer	F	4	3	1	8
	Moshe Levy	Israel	Swimming, Wheelchair basketball	1976	Summer	M	4	2	1	7
	Guo Jincheng	China	Swimming	2024	Summer	M	4	2	0	6
	Olena Iurkovska	Ukraine	Multiple	2006	Winter	F	4	1	1	6
	Veronika Aigner	Austria	Skiing	2026	Winter	F	4	1	0	5
	Henrieta Farkasova	Slovakia	Skiing	2018	Winter	F	4	1	0	5
	Zipora Rubin-Rosenbaum	Israel	Athletics, Wheelchair basketball	1976	Summer	M	4	1	0	5
	Natalia Subrtova	Slovakia	Skiing	2018	Winter	F	4	1	0	5
	Timothy McIsaac	Canada	Swimming	1980	Summer	M	4	1	0	5
	Rimma Batalova	Unified Team	Athletics	1992	Summer	M	4	1	0	5
	Tanni Grey-Thompson	Great Britain	Athletics	1992	Summer	M	4	1	0	5
	Frank Höfle	Germany	Skiing	1994	Winter	M	4	1	0	5
	David Roberts	Great Britain	Swimming	2004	Summer	M	4	1	0	5
	Darren Kenny	Great Britain	Cycling	2008	Summer	M	4	1	0	5
	Gerd Schönfelder	Germany	Multiple	2010	Winter	M	4	1	0	5
	Irek Zaripov	Russia	Multiple	2010	Winter	M	4	1	0	5
	Oksana Masters	United States	Multiple	2026	Winter	F	4	0	1	5
	Eve M. Rimmer	New Zealand	Athletics	1976	Summer	F	4	0	0	4
	Cato Zahl Pedersen	Norway	Athletics	1980	Summer	M	4	0	0	4
	Lahja Haemaelaeinen	Finland	Ice Sledge	1984	Winter	F	4	0	0	4
	Barbara Caspers	Australia	Shooting	1984	Summer	F	4	0	0	4
	Libby Kosmala	Australia	Shooting	1984	Summer	F	4	0	0	4
	Felix Karl	Austria	Ice Sledge	1988	Winter	M	4	0	0	4
	Reinhild Möller	Germany	Skiing	1994	Winter	M	4	0	0	4
	Brian Santos	United States	Skiing	1994	Winter	M	4	0	0	4
	Loevaas Terje	Norway	Skiing	1994	Winter	M	4	0	0	4
	Chris Waddell	United States	Skiing	1994	Winter	M	4	0	0	4
	Rolf Heinzmann	Switzerland	Skiing	1998	Winter	M	4	0	0	4
	Martin Braxenthaler	Germany	Skiing	2002	Winter	M	4	0	0	4
	Michael Milton	Australia	Skiing	2002	Winter	M	4	0	0	4
	Sarah Will	United States	Skiing	2002	Summer	F	4	0	0	4
	Jonas Jacobsson	Sweden	Shooting	2004	Summer	M	4	0	0	4
	Sarah Storey	Great Britain	Cycling	2012	Summer	F	4	0	0	4
	David Weir	Great Britain	Athletics	2012	Summer	M	4	0	0	4
	Daniel Giladi	Israel	Swimming, Volleyball	1976	Summer	M	4	0	0	4
	Ariela Meizan	Israel	Swimming, Wheelchair basketball	1976	Summer	M	4	0	0	4
	Uri Bergman	Israel	Swimming	1980	Summer	M	4	0	0	4

== List of most individual gold medals won at a single Paralympic Games ==
Rank	Athlete	Nation	Sport	Year	Games	Sex	Gold	Silver	Bronze	Total
	Maria Scutti	Italy	Multiple	1960	Summer	F	10	3	2	15
	Trischa Zorn	United States	Swimming	1988	Summer	F	10	0	0	10
	Roberto Marson	Italy	Multiple	1968	Summer	M	9	0	1	10
	John Morgan	United States	Swimming	1992	Summer	M	8	2	0	10
	Michael Edgson	Canada	Swimming	1988	Summer	M	7	0	0	7
	Knut Lundstroem	Norway	Multiple	1988	Winter	M	7	0	0	7
	Jacqueline Freney	Australia	Swimming	2012	Summer	F	7	0	0	7
	Magdalena Tjernberg	Sweden	Swimming	1988	Summer	F	6	2	0	8
	Martha Gustafson	United States	Multiple	1984	Summer	F	6	1	0	6
	Christopher Holmes	Great Britain	Swimmer	1992	Summer	M	6	1	0	6
	Ed Owen	United States	Multiple	1968	Summer	M	6	0	1	7
	Ingrid Lauridsen	Denmark	Athletics	1984	Summer	F	6	0	1	7
	Ron Stein	United States	Multiple	1964	Summer	M	6	0	0	6
	Claudia Hengst	West Germany	Swimming	1988	Summer	F	6	0	0	6
	Franz Nietlispach	Switzerland	Athletics	1988	Summer	M	6	0	0	6
	Bart Dodson	United States	Athletics	1992	Summer	M	6	0	0	6
	Béatrice Hess	France	Swimming	2000	Summer	F	6	0	0	6
	Siobhan Paton	Australia	Swimming	2000	Summer	F	6	0	0	6
	Mayumi Narita	Japan	Swimming	2004	Summer	F	6	0	0	6
	Siegmar Henker	West Germany	Multiple	1984	Summer	M	5	1	0	6
	Ragnhild Myklebust	Norway	Multiple	1988	Winter	F	5	1	0	6
	Natalie du Toit	South Africa	Swimming	2004	Summer	F	5	1	0	6
	Ihar Boki	Belarus	Swimming	2012	Summer	M	5	1	0	6
	Catherine Debrunner	Switzerland	Athletics	2024	Summer	F	5	1	0	6
	Brit Mjaasund Oejen	Norway	Multiple	1980	Winter	F	5	0	0	5
	Erling Trondsen	Norway	Swimming	1984	Summer	M	5	0	0	5
	Mike Kenny	Great Britain	Swimming	1988	Summer	M	5	0	0	5
	Elizabeth Scott	United States	Swimming	1992	Summer	F	5	0	0	5
	Hong Yan Zhu	China	Swimming	2000	Summer	F	5	0	0	5
	Chantal Petitclerc	Canada	Athletics	2004	Summer	F	5	0	0	5
	Lauren Woolstencroft	Canada	Skiing	2010	Winter	F	5	0	0	5
	Verena Bentele	Germany	Multiple	2010	Winter	F	5	0	0	5
	Anna Maria Toso	Italy	Multiple	1964	Summer	F	4	4	0	8
	Josefina Cornejo	Mexico	Multiple	1980	Summer	F	4	3	1	8
	Daniel Dias	Brazil	Swimming	2008	Summer	M	4	3	0	7
	Matthew Cowdrey	Australia	Swimming	2008	Summer	M	4	2	0	6
	Matthew Cowdrey	Australia	Swimming	2012	Summer	M	4	2	0	6
	Priya Cooper	Australia	Swimming	1996	Summer	F	4	1	1	6
	Olena Iurkovska	Ukraine	Multiple	2006	Winter	F	4	1	1	6
	Veronika Aigner	Austria	Skiing	2026	Winter	F	4	1	0	5
	Henrieta Farkasova	Slovakia	Skiing	2018	Winter	F	4	1	0	5
	Natalia Subrtova	Slovakia	Skiing	2018	Winter	F	4	1	0	5
	Rimma Batalova	Unified Team	Athletics	1992	Summer	M	4	1	0	5
	Darren Kenny	Great Britain	Cycling	2008	Summer	M	4	1	0	5
	Gerd Schönfelder	Germany	Multiple	2010	Winter	M	4	1	0	5
	Irek Zaripov	Russia	Multiple	2010	Winter	M	4	1	0	5
	Timothy McIsaac	Canada	Swimming	1988	Summer	M	4	0	2	6
	Marijke Ruiter	Netherlands	Swimming	1976	Summer	F	4	0	0	4
	Eve M. Rimmer	New Zealand	Athletics	1976	Summer	F	4	0	0	4
	Cato Zahl Pedersen	Norway	Athletics	1980	Summer	M	4	0	0	4
	Barbara Caspers	Australia	Shooting	1984	Summer	F	4	0	0	4
	Libby Kosmala	Australia	Shooting	1984	Summer	F	4	0	0	4
	Lahja Haemaelaeinen	Finland	Ice Sledge	1984	Winter	F	4	0	0	4
	Arkadiusz Pawlowski	Poland	Swimming	1984	Summer	M	4	0	0	4
	Felix Karl	Austria	Ice Sledge	1988	Winter	M	4	0	0	4
	Frank Höfle	Germany	Skiing	1994	Winter	M	4	0	0	4
	Tanni Grey-Thompson	Great Britain	Athletics	1992	Summer	M	4	0	0	4
	Reinhild Möller	Germany	Skiing	1994	Winter	M	4	0	0	4
	Brian Santos	United States	Skiing	1994	Winter	M	4	0	0	4
	Loevaas Terje	Norway	Skiing	1994	Winter	M	4	0	0	4
	Chris Waddell	United States	Skiing	1994	Winter	M	4	0	0	4
	Rolf Heinzmann	Switzerland	Skiing	1998	Winter	M	4	0	0	4
	Martin Braxenthaler	Germany	Skiing	2002	Winter	M	4	0	0	4
	Michael Milton	Australia	Skiing	2002	Winter	M	4	0	0	4
	Sarah Will	United States	Skiing	2002	Summer	F	4	0	0	4
	Jonas Jacobsson	Sweden	Shooting	2004	Summer	M	4	0	0	4
	David Weir	Great Britain	Athletics	2012	Summer	M	4	0	0	4
	Sarah Storey	Great Britain	Cycling	2012	Summer	F	4	0	0	4
	Stéphanie Dixon	Canada	Swimming	2000	Summer	F	3	2	0	5
	Teresa Perales	Spain	Swimming	2008	Summer	F	3	1	1	5
	David Roberts	Great Britain	Swimming	2004	Summer	M	3	1	0	4
	Joseph Wengier	Israel	Swimming	1976	Summer	M	4	0	1	5
	Uri Bergman	Israel	Swimming	1976	Summer	M	4	0	0	4
	Isabel Newstead	Great Britain	Swimming	1980	Summer	F	3	0	0	3
	Tim Sullivan	Australia	Athletics	2000	Summer	M	3	0	0	3
	Saysunee Jana	Thailand	Fencing	2024	Summer	F	3	0	0	3

== See also ==
- List of multiple Olympic gold medalists
- List of multiple Olympic gold medalists at a single Games
- List of multiple Olympic gold medalists in one event
- List of multiple Paralympic gold medalists
