= Swimming at the Summer Paralympics =

- Governing body: IPC
- Events: 147 (men: 82; women: 65)

Games
- 1960; 1964; 1968; 1972; 1976; 1980; 1984; 1988; 1992; 1996; 2000; 2004; 2008; 2012; 2016; 2020; 2024
- Medalists; Records

Swimming has been contested at every Summer Paralympics. At the first games, the 1960 Paralympics, 62 swimming events were held in distances of 25 and 50 metres, plus a 3×50 metre relay for men. Since then, swimming at the Paralympics has grown to 140 events covering distances from 50 to 400 metres, plus 4×50 and 4×100 metre relays. Along with track and field athletics, it is one of the largest sports at the Paralympics in terms of the number of events, competitors, and spectators.

As with most Paralympic sports, athletes are classified according to the type and extent of their disability.

The International Paralympic Committee recognizes the fastest times swum at the games as Paralympic records.

== Summary ==
| Games | Year | Events | Best Nation |
|---|---|---|---|
| 1 | 1960 | 69 | Italy |
| 2 | 1964 | 62 | United States |
| 3 | 1968 | 68 | Great Britain |
| 4 | 1972 | 56 | Netherlands |
| 5 | 1976 | 146 | Netherlands |
| 6 | 1980 | 193 | Poland |
| 7 | 1984 | 347 | Netherlands |
| 8 | 1988 | 259 | United States |
| 9 | 1992 | 199 | United States |
| 10 | 1996 | 168 | Germany |
| 11 | 2000 | 170 | Canada |
| 12 | 2004 | 167 | China |
| 13 | 2008 | 141 | United States |
| 14 | 2012 | 148 | China |
| 15 | 2016 | 153 | China |
| 16 | 2020 | 146 | China |
| 17 | 2024 | 141 | China |

== Medal table ==
Updated to 2024 Summer Paralympics. Countries in italics are former countries who participated in the Paralympic Games.

| Rank | Nation | Gold | Silver | Bronze | Total |
|---|---|---|---|---|---|
| 1 | United States (USA) | 294 | 231 | 227 | 752 |
| 2 | Great Britain (GBR) | 248 | 265 | 244 | 757 |
| 3 | Netherlands (NED) | 191 | 136 | 118 | 445 |
| 4 | Canada (CAN) | 171 | 130 | 129 | 430 |
| 5 | China (CHN) | 161 | 146 | 116 | 423 |
| 6 | Australia (AUS) | 149 | 180 | 185 | 514 |
| 7 | France (FRA) | 122 | 113 | 114 | 349 |
| 8 | Poland (POL) | 119 | 115 | 86 | 320 |
| 9 | Spain (ESP) | 112 | 130 | 126 | 368 |
| 10 | Sweden (SWE) | 111 | 125 | 84 | 320 |
| 11 | Ukraine (UKR) | 91 | 95 | 97 | 283 |
| 12 | West Germany (FRG) | 76 | 67 | 58 | 201 |
| 13 | Norway (NOR) | 72 | 51 | 41 | 164 |
| 14 | Germany (GER) | 65 | 76 | 64 | 205 |
| 15 | Italy (ITA) | 65 | 71 | 73 | 209 |
| 16 | Israel (ISR) | 63 | 59 | 52 | 174 |
| 17 | Brazil (BRA) | 47 | 48 | 56 | 151 |
| 18 | Japan (JPN) | 44 | 33 | 47 | 124 |
| 19 | Denmark (DEN) | 38 | 37 | 65 | 140 |
| 20 | South Africa (RSA) | 34 | 25 | 27 | 86 |
| 21 | Russia (RUS) | 33 | 26 | 33 | 92 |
| 22 | New Zealand (NZL) | 33 | 21 | 17 | 71 |
| 23 | Mexico (MEX) | 32 | 20 | 31 | 83 |
| 24 | Hungary (HUN) | 28 | 30 | 34 | 92 |
| 25 | Belarus (BLR) | 25 | 12 | 6 | 43 |
| 26 | Iceland (ISL) | 24 | 13 | 24 | 61 |
| 27 | Austria (AUT) | 19 | 13 | 17 | 49 |
| 28 | RPC (RPC) | 17 | 14 | 18 | 49 |
| 29 | Neutral Paralympic Athletes (NPA) | 16 | 14 | 11 | 41 |
| 30 | Argentina (ARG) | 15 | 26 | 25 | 66 |
| 31 | Czech Republic (CZE) | 14 | 7 | 18 | 39 |
| 32 | Rhodesia (RHO) | 12 | 13 | 11 | 36 |
| 33 | Greece (GRE) | 11 | 18 | 14 | 43 |
| 34 | Ireland (IRL) | 11 | 12 | 10 | 33 |
| 35 | Finland (FIN) | 7 | 17 | 24 | 48 |
| 36 | Unified Team (EUN) | 7 | 3 | 7 | 17 |
| 37 | South Korea (KOR) | 7 | 2 | 5 | 14 |
| 38 | Singapore (SIN) | 7 | 1 | 1 | 9 |
| 39 | Belgium (BEL) | 6 | 16 | 15 | 37 |
| 40 | Azerbaijan (AZE) | 5 | 8 | 3 | 16 |
| 41 | Jamaica (JAM) | 5 | 6 | 3 | 14 |
| 42 | Colombia (COL) | 4 | 14 | 9 | 27 |
| 43 | Switzerland (SUI) | 3 | 10 | 8 | 21 |
| 44 | Yugoslavia (YUG) | 3 | 5 | 9 | 17 |
| 45 | Cyprus (CYP) | 3 | 2 | 3 | 8 |
| 46 | Romania (ROM) | 3 | 1 | 0 | 4 |
| 47 | Estonia (EST) | 2 | 5 | 2 | 9 |
| 48 | Uzbekistan (UZB) | 2 | 4 | 9 | 15 |
| 49 | Slovakia (SVK) | 2 | 2 | 1 | 5 |
| 50 | Peru (PER) | 2 | 1 | 3 | 6 |
| 51 | Turkey (TUR) | 2 | 0 | 2 | 4 |
| 52 | Faroe Islands (FRO) | 1 | 7 | 5 | 13 |
| 53 | Egypt (EGY) | 1 | 3 | 6 | 10 |
| 54 | Thailand (THA) | 1 | 3 | 4 | 8 |
| 55 | Chile (CHI) | 1 | 2 | 3 | 6 |
| 56 | Cuba (CUB) | 1 | 2 | 2 | 5 |
| 57 | Luxembourg (LUX) | 1 | 2 | 0 | 3 |
| 58 | Hong Kong (HKG) | 1 | 1 | 4 | 6 |
| 59 | Kazakhstan (KAZ) | 1 | 1 | 1 | 3 |
| 60 | Independent Paralympic Participants (IPP) | 1 | 1 | 0 | 2 |
| 61 | India (IND) | 1 | 0 | 0 | 1 |
| 61 | Kenya (KEN) | 1 | 0 | 0 | 1 |
| 63 | Soviet Union (URS) | 0 | 11 | 9 | 20 |
| 64 | Portugal (POR) | 0 | 3 | 7 | 10 |
| 65 | Zimbabwe (ZIM) | 0 | 2 | 3 | 5 |
| 66 | Uruguay (URU) | 0 | 1 | 4 | 5 |
| 67 | Kuwait (KUW) | 0 | 1 | 2 | 3 |
| 68 | Czechoslovakia (TCH) | 0 | 1 | 1 | 2 |
| 68 | Lithuania (LTU) | 0 | 1 | 1 | 2 |
| 70 | Bosnia and Herzegovina (BIH) | 0 | 1 | 0 | 1 |
| 70 | Bulgaria (BUL) | 0 | 1 | 0 | 1 |
| 70 | Vietnam (VIE) | 0 | 1 | 0 | 1 |
| 73 | Croatia (CRO) | 0 | 0 | 6 | 6 |
| 74 | Slovenia (SLO) | 0 | 0 | 2 | 2 |
| 75 | Bahamas (BAH) | 0 | 0 | 1 | 1 |
| 75 | Morocco (MAR) | 0 | 0 | 1 | 1 |
| 75 | Trinidad and Tobago (TTO) | 0 | 0 | 1 | 1 |
| Totals (77 entries) | | 2,644 | 2,514 | 2,445 | 7,603 |

== Multiple Paralympic swimming medalists ==
This table is updated to the 2016 Paralympics.

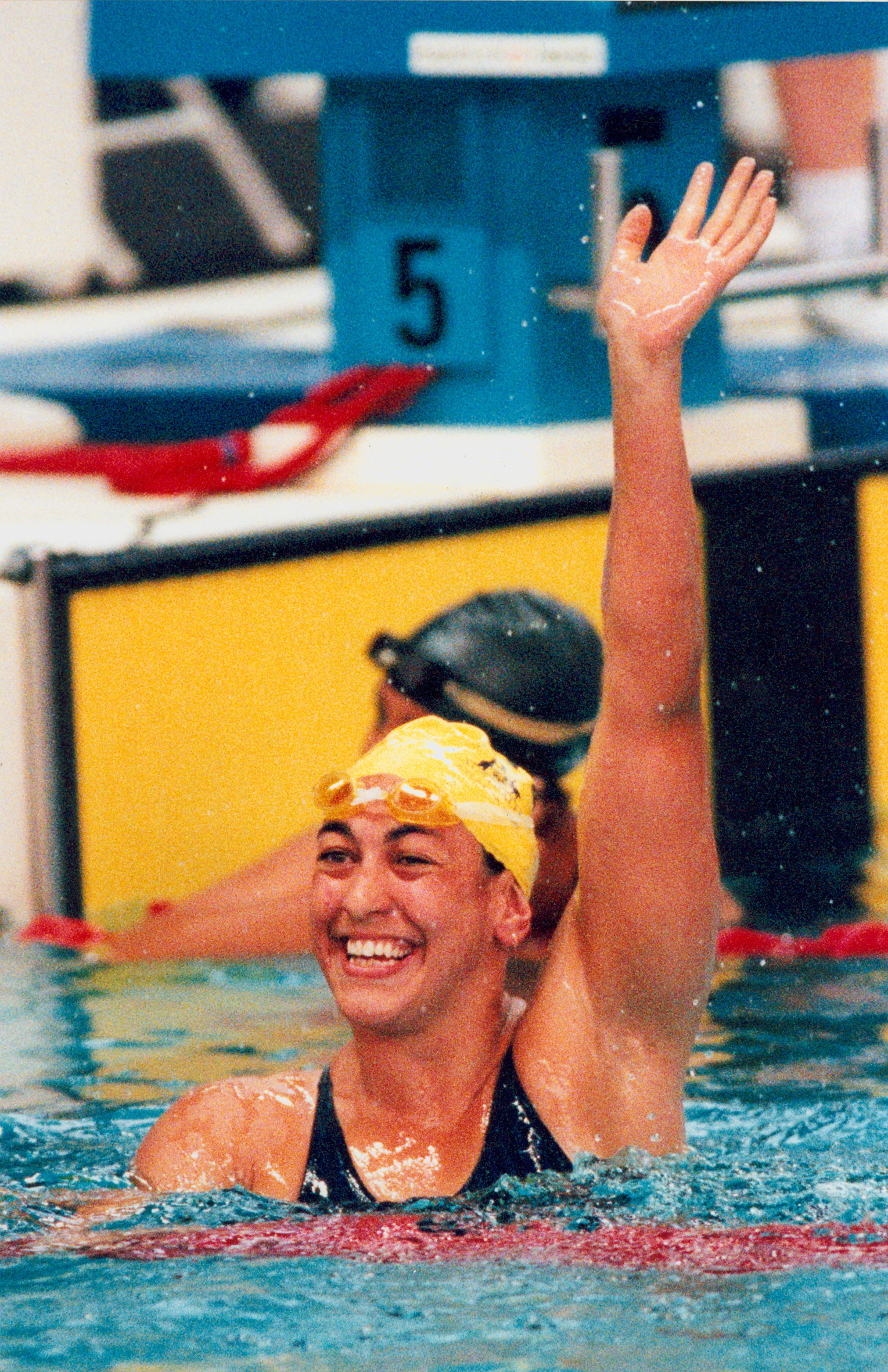
Australian swimmer Priya Cooper acknowledges the crowd after another winning performance in the S8 class at the 1996 Atlanta Paralympic Games

| Athlete | Nation | Years active | Class(es) | Gold | Silver | Bronze | Total |
|---|---|---|---|---|---|---|---|
| Trischa Zorn | United States | 1980 - 2004 | B1, B2, B3 | 41 | 9 | 4 | 54 |
| Béatrice Hess | France | 1984 - 2004 | S5 | 20 | 5 | 0 | 25 |
| Michael Edgson | Canada | 1984 - 1992 | B3 | 18 | 0 | 0 | 18 |
| Jessica Long | United States | 2004 - | S8, SB7, SM8 | 16 | 8 | 5 | 29 |
| Mike Kenny | Great Britain | 1976 - 1988 | 1A, 1C | 16 | 2 | 0 | 18 |
| Ihar Boki | Belarus | 2012 - | S13, SB13, SM13 | 16 | 1 | 1 | 18 |
| Mayumi Narita | Japan | 1996 - 2004 | SM4, S4, SB3, 20pts | 15 | 3 | 2 | 20 |
| Daniel Dias | Brazil | 2008 - 2016 | S5 | 14 | 7 | 6 | 27 |
| Erin Popovich | United States | 2000 - 2008 | S6, S7 | 14 | 5 | 0 | 19 |
| Matthew Cowdrey | Australia | 2004 - 2012 | S9 | 13 | 7 | 3 | 23 |
| Erling Trondsen | Norway | 1976 - 1992 | C1, A3, L4, S8, SM8 | 13 | 6 | 1 | 20 |
| Claudia Hengst | West Germany / Germany | 1988 - 2004 | L6, SM10 | 13 | 4 | 8 | 25 |
| Natalie du Toit | South Africa | 2004 - 2012 | S9 | 13 | 2 | 0 | 15 |
| John Morgan | United States | 1984 - 1992 | B1, B2 | 13 | 2 | 0 | 15 |
| Uri Bergman | Israel | 1976 - 1988 | 6 | 12 | 1 | 2 | 15 |
| Sophie Pascoe | New Zealand | 2008 - | S10, SB9, SM10, S9, SM9 | 11 | 7 | 1 | 19 |
| David Roberts | Great Britain | 2000 - 2008 | S7 | 11 | 4 | 1 | 16 |
| Joseph Wengier | Israel | 1972 - 1988 | ? | 10 | 4 | 5 | 19 |
| Magdalena Tjernberg | Sweden | 1984 - 1988 | B1 | 10 | 3 | 0 | 13 |
| Elizabeth Scott | United States | 1992 - 2000 | B3? | 10 | 2 | 5 | 17 |
| Marijke Ruiter | Netherlands | 1972 - 1976 | 5 | 10 | 0 | 0 | 10 |
| Christopher Holmes | Great Britain | 1988 - 2000 | S12? | 9 | 5 | 1 | 15 |
| Priya Cooper | Australia | 1992 - 2000 | S8 | 9 | 3 | 4 | 16 |
| Jacqueline Freney | Australia | 2008 - 2012 | SM7, S7, S8, 34pts | 8 | 0 | 3 | 11 |
| Stephanie Dixon | Canada | 2000 - 2008 | S9 | 7 | 8 | 2 | 17 |
| Siobhan Paton | Australia | 2000 | S14 | 6 | 0 | 0 | 6 |

== Nations ==
| Nation | 60 | 64 | 68 | 72 | 76 | 80 | 84 | 88 | 92 | 96 | 00 | 04 | 08 | 12 | 16 | 20 | 24 | Total |
|---|---|---|---|---|---|---|---|---|---|---|---|---|---|---|---|---|---|---|
| Argentina (ARG) | 5 | 8 | 10 | 7 | 8 | 5 | | 2 | 2 | 8 | 8 | 10 | 12 | 8 | 11 | 9 | 12 | 16 |
| Armenia (ARM) | | | | | | | | | | | | | | 1 | 1 | | | 2 |
| Aruba (ARU) | | | | | | | | | | | | | | | 1 | | | 1 |
| Australia (AUS) | 1 | 8 | 14 | 7 | 8 | 11 | 29 | 25 | 27 | 30 | 53 | 30 | 35 | 34 | 36 | 34 | 30 | 17 |
| Austria (AUT) | 8 | 4 | 17 | 9 | 10 | 9 | 4 | 3 | 1 | | 3 | 2 | 2 | 3 | 2 | 3 | 3 | 16 |
| Azerbaijan (AZE) | | | | | | | | | | | | | | 1 | 2 | 3 | 3 | 4 |
| Bahamas (BAH) | | | | | | 2 | | 4 | | | | | | | | | | 2 |
| Barbados (BAR) | | | | | | | | | | | | | 1 | | | | | 1 |
| Belarus (BLR) | | | | | | | | | | 2 | 2 | 7 | 6 | 6 | 6 | | | 6 |
| Belgium (BEL) | | | 4 | 2 | 11 | 12 | 3 | 2 | 4 | 4 | 4 | 3 | 2 | 4 | 4 | | | 13 |
| Bosnia and Herzegovina (BIH) | | | | | | | | | | | | 1 | | | | | | 1 |
| Brazil (BRA) | | | | 1 | 1 | 1 | 5 | 9 | 13 | 11 | 63 | 21 | 24 | 20 | 34 | | | 12 |
| Bulgaria (BUL) | | | | | | | | | | 1 | | | | | | | | 1 |
| Canada (CAN) | | | 15 | 14 | 26 | 31 | 53 | 27 | 23 | 13 | 25 | 19 | 21 | 24 | 26 | | | 13 |
| Chile (CHI) | | | | | | | | | 1 | 1 | 1 | | 1 | 1 | 2 | | | 6 |
| China (CHN) | | | | | | | 15 | 10 | 7 | 11 | 27 | 51 | 40 | 51 | 61 | | | 9 |
| Chinese Taipei (TPE) | | | | | | | | | 2 | 3 | 1 | 1 | 1 | 2 | | | | 6 |
| Colombia (COL) | | | | | | 2 | | 4 | | | 2 | | 3 | 6 | 9 | | | 6 |
| Costa Rica (CRC) | | | | | | | | | | | | | | | 1 | | | 1 |
| Croatia (CRO) | | | | | | | | | 3 | 2 | 2 | 3 | 4 | 4 | 2 | | | 7 |
| Cuba (CUB) | | | | | | | | | 4 | 2 | 1 | 1 | 1 | 2 | 3 | | | 7 |
| Cyprus (CYP) | | | | | | | | 1 | 2 | 1 | 2 | 3 | 2 | 1 | 1 | | | 8 |
| Czechoslovakia (TCH) | | | | 3 | | 2 | | | | | | | | | | | | 2 |
| Czech Republic (CZE) | | | | | | | | | | 2 | 13 | 16 | 7 | 7 | 6 | | | 6 |
| Denmark (DEN) | | | 3 | 5 | 5 | 15 | 15 | 14 | 14 | 14 | 14 | 8 | 4 | 5 | 4 | | | 13 |
| Ecuador (ECU) | | | | | 3 | | 1 | | | | | | | 1 | | | | 3 |
| Egypt (EGY) | | | | | 7 | 8 | 3 | 9 | 3 | 5 | 1 | | | | 2 | | | 8 |
| Estonia (EST) | | | | | | | | | 3 | 4 | 4 | 3 | 2 | 2 | 3 | | | 7 |
| Faroe Islands (FRO) | | | | | | | 3 | 4 | 2 | 1 | 2 | 1 | 1 | 1 | 1 | | | 9 |
| Fiji (FIJ) | | | | | 7 | | | | | | 1 | 1 | | | | | | 3 |
| Finland (FIN) | | | 1 | 10 | 14 | 8 | 7 | 7 | 4 | 4 | 5 | 4 | 1 | 2 | 3 | | | 13 |
| France (FRA) | 1 | 1 | 13 | 19 | 20 | 28 | 29 | 25 | 19 | 16 | 15 | 11 | 12 | 10 | 6 | | | 15 |
| Georgia (GEO) | | | | | | | | | | | | | | 1 | 1 | | | 2 |
| Germany (GER) | 7 | 4 | | | | | | | 34 | 28 | 26 | 18 | 21 | 21 | 30 | | | 9 |
| Great Britain (GBR) | 14 | 13 | 29 | 23 | 15 | 22 | 70 | 42 | 45 | 53 | 48 | 34 | 35 | 49 | 30 | | | 15 |
| Greece (GRE) | | | | | 2 | | | 2 | 1 | 5 | 10 | 12 | 13 | 11 | 16 | | | 9 |
| Guatemala (GUA) | | | | | 5 | | 2 | | | | | | | | | | | 2 |
| Honduras (HON) | | | | | | | | | | | | | | | 1 | | | 1 |
| Hong Kong (HKG) | | | | 3 | 2 | 3 | 2 | 3 | | | 4 | | | 5 | 2 | | | 8 |
| Hungary (HUN) | | | | | | | 9 | 8 | 8 | 10 | 12 | 8 | 11 | 9 | 10 | | | 9 |
| Iceland (ISL) | | | | | | 5 | 7 | 10 | 9 | 8 | 4 | 1 | 2 | 2 | 3 | | | 10 |
| India (IND) | | | 3 | 3 | | | 2 | | | | | | | 1 | 1 | | | 5 |
| Indonesia (INA) | | | | | 1 | 3 | 1 | 1 | | | | 1 | 1 | 1 | 4 | | | 8 |
| Individual Paralympic Athletes (IPA) | | | | | | | | | | | | | | | 1 | | | 1 |
| Iran (IRI) | | | | | | | | | | | | | | 1 | 1 | | | 2 |
| Iraq (IRQ) | | | | | | | | | | | | | | 1 | 1 | | | 2 |
| Ireland (IRL) | 1 | | 3 | 4 | 4 | 1 | 5 | 5 | 4 | 3 | 3 | 3 | 6 | 5 | 4 | | | 14 |
| Israel (ISR) | 2 | 5 | 19 | 15 | 24 | 8 | 13 | 12 | 11 | 7 | 8 | 8 | 7 | 5 | 7 | | | 15 |
| Italy (ITA) | 16 | 14 | 12 | 4 | 5 | 2 | 11 | 20 | 10 | 7 | 2 | 7 | 10 | 11 | 21 | | | 15 |
| Jamaica (JAM) | | | 3 | 8 | | 4 | | | 1 | | 1 | | | | | | | 5 |
| Japan (JPN) | | 6 | 3 | 1 | 8 | 6 | 7 | 37 | 10 | 7 | 17 | 24 | 18 | 20 | 19 | | | 14 |
| Kazakhstan (KAZ) | | | | | | | | | | | | 1 | 1 | 2 | 4 | | | 4 |
| Kenya (KEN) | | | | 1 | | | 2 | | 1 | | | | | | | | | 3 |
| Kuwait (KUW) | | | | | | | | 3 | 2 | 1 | | | | | | | | 3 |
| Latvia (LAT) | | | | | | | | | | | | | | 1 | 1 | | | 2 |
| Lithuania (LTU) | | | | | | | | | | | 1 | 1 | 2 | 1 | 1 | | | 5 |
| Luxembourg (LUX) | | | | | 1 | 2 | 1 | | 1 | | | | | | | | | 4 |
| Macau (MAC) | | | | | | | | 1 | | | 1 | | 1 | | 1 | | | 4 |
| Madagascar (MAD) | | | | | | | | | | | | | 1 | | | | | 1 |
| Malaysia (MAS) | | | | | | | | 2 | 2 | 1 | 2 | 3 | 2 | 2 | 1 | | | 8 |
| Malta (MLT) | | | | | | | 1 | | | | | | | | 1 | | | 2 |
| Mauritius (MRI) | | | | | | | | | | | | | 1 | | 1 | | | 2 |
| Mexico (MEX) | | | | 1 | 19 | 15 | 8 | 1 | 3 | 4 | 12 | 11 | 11 | 16 | 20 | | | 12 |
| Moldova (MDA) | | | | | | | | | | | | | | | 1 | | | 1 |
| Montenegro (MNE) | | | | | | | | | | | | | 1 | | 1 | | | 2 |
| Morocco (MAR) | | | | | | | | 3 | 3 | | 1 | | | | | | | 3 |
| Myanmar (MYA) | | | | | | | | | | | | | 2 | 1 | 1 | | | 3 |
| Namibia (NAM) | | | | | | | | | | | | | | | 1 | | | 1 |
| Nepal (NEP) | | | | | | | | | | | | | | | 1 | | | 1 |
| Netherlands (NED) | 2 | 4 | 12 | 15 | 24 | 38 | 27 | 18 | 12 | 19 | 15 | 7 | 7 | 13 | 19 | | | 15 |
| New Zealand (NZL) | | | 6 | 5 | 3 | 6 | 1 | 3 | 3 | 7 | 5 | 5 | 3 | 6 | 8 | | | 13 |
| Norway (NOR) | 10 | | 10 | 11 | 10 | 14 | 23 | 1 | 10 | 8 | 7 | 6 | 5 | 4 | 3 | | | 14 |
| Pakistan (PAK) | | | | | | | | | 1 | | | | | | | | | 1 |
| Panama (PAN) | | | | | | | | | | | | 1 | 1 | | | | | 2 |
| Peru (PER) | | | | 1 | 1 | | | | | 2 | 2 | 2 | 2 | | | | | 6 |
| Philippines (PHI) | | | | | | | | 1 | | | | | | 1 | 1 | | | 3 |
| Poland (POL) | | | | 14 | 18 | 29 | 14 | 17 | 9 | 8 | 23 | 24 | 12 | 9 | 8 | | | 12 |
| Portugal (POR) | | | | | | | | | 6 | 6 | 5 | | 8 | 4 | 5 | | | 6 |
| Puerto Rico (PUR) | | | | | | | | | | | | | | | 2 | | | 1 |
| Rhodesia (RHO) | 1 | 3 | 11 | 12 | | | | | | | | | | | | | | 4 |
| Romania (ROU) | | | | | | | | | | | | | | 2 | 3 | | | 2 |
| Russia (RUS) | | | | | | | | | | 10 | 20 | 15 | 34 | 36 | | | | 5 |
| Rwanda (RWA) | | | | | | | | | | | 1 | | | | | | | 1 |
| Serbia and Montenegro (SCG) | | | | | | | | | | | 2 | 1 | | | | | | 1 |
| Seychelles (SEY) | | | | | | | | | 1 | | | | | | | | | 1 |
| Singapore (SGP) | | | | | | | | 2 | | | | 1 | 2 | 2 | 2 | | | 5 |
| Slovakia (SVK) | | | | | | | | | | 5 | 6 | 4 | 3 | 2 | 1 | | | 6 |
| Slovenia (SLO) | | | | | | | | | 1 | 1 | 1 | 1 | 1 | 1 | 1 | | | 7 |
| Soviet Union (URS) | | | | | | | | 8 | | | | | | | | | | 1 |
| South Africa (RSA) | | 3 | 3 | 9 | 10 | | | | 2 | | 12 | 9 | 10 | 10 | 6 | | | 10 |
| South Korea (KOR) | | | | | | | | 16 | 3 | 2 | 3 | 4 | 5 | 9 | 8 | | | 8 |
| Spain (ESP) | | | 4 | 14 | 6 | 10 | 20 | 19 | 52 | 41 | 55 | 47 | 39 | 32 | | | | 12 |
| Sri Lanka (SRI) | | | | | | | | | | | 1 | 1 | | | | | | 2 |
| Sudan (SUD) | | | | | | 2 | | | | | | | | | | | | 1 |
| Sweden (SWE) | | | 5 | 10 | 25 | 31 | 23 | 24 | 18 | 17 | 8 | 3 | 4 | 5 | 6 | | | 13 |
| Switzerland (SUI) | 2 | | 9 | 6 | 9 | 9 | 3 | 5 | 3 | 3 | 2 | 5 | 1 | 1 | 1 | | | 14 |
| Syria (SYR) | | | | | | | | | 1 | | | | | | | | | 1 |
| Thailand (THA) | | | | | | | 2 | 2 | 1 | 1 | 10 | 12 | 8 | 7 | 4 | | | 9 |
| Trinidad and Tobago (TTO) | | | | | | | 4 | 4 | | | | | | | 1 | | | 3 |
| Turkey (TUR) | | | | | | | | | 1 | | 1 | 2 | | 2 | 3 | | | 5 |
| Uganda (UGA) | | | | | | | | | | | 1 | | | | | | | 1 |
| Ukraine (UKR) | | | | | | | | | | 7 | 11 | 21 | 31 | 44 | 45 | | | 6 |
| Unified Team (EUN) | | | | | | | | | 11 | | | | | | | | | 1 |
| United States (USA) | 6 | 25 | 33 | 20 | 32 | 45 | 63 | 73 | 66 | 42 | 29 | 45 | 38 | 34 | 33 | | | 15 |
| Uruguay (URU) | | | | | | | | | | | 1 | | | 1 | 1 | | | 3 |
| Uzbekistan (UZB) | | | | | | | | | | | | | 1 | 1 | 7 | | | 3 |
| Venezuela (VEN) | | | | | | | 1 | | 2 | | 1 | 3 | 3 | 4 | 2 | | | 7 |
| Vietnam (VIE) | | | | | | | | | | | | 1 | 1 | 3 | 4 | | | 4 |
| West Germany (FRG) | | | 20 | 19 | 18 | 44 | 35 | 14 | | | | | | | | | | 6 |
| Yemen (YEM) | | | | | | | | | 1 | | | | | | | | | 1 |
| Yugoslavia (YUG) | | | | 3 | | 5 | 7 | 2 | | 1 | 1 | | | | | | | 6 |
| Zimbabwe (ZIM) | | | | | | 3 | 1 | | | | | | | | | | | 2 |
| Nations | 15 | 13 | 24 | 33 | 34 | 36 | 43 | 44 | 56 | 50 | 62 | 61 | 62 | 66 | 79 | | | |
| Competitors | 77 | 98 | 264 | 279 | 362 | 441 | 541 | 502 | 487 | 457 | 575 | 560 | 547 | 600 | 593 | | | |
| Year | 60 | 64 | 68 | 72 | 76 | 80 | 84 | 88 | 92 | 96 | 00 | 04 | 08 | 12 | 16 | 20 | | |

== See also ==
- Swimming at the Summer Olympics
- World Para Swimming Championships
