= List of multiple Paralympic gold medalists =

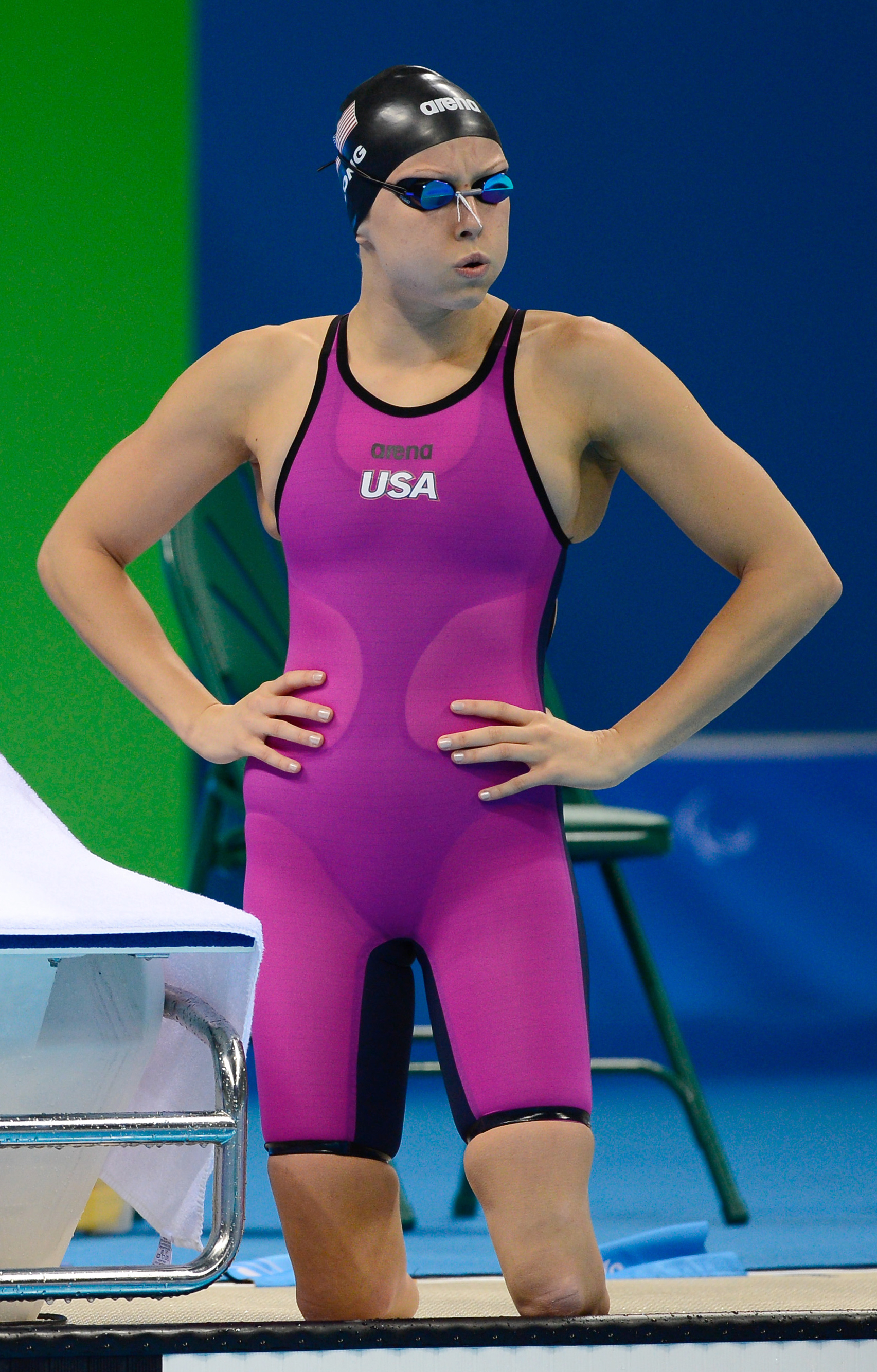
Jessica Long, 29 medals at the Summer Paralympics.

This is a list of multiple Paralympic gold medalists, listing people who have won ten or more gold medals at the Paralympic Games. The Paralympics listed for each athlete only include games when they won medals. See the particular article on the athlete for more details on when and for what nation an athlete competed. More medals are available in some events than others, and the number of events in which medals are available overall have changed over time.

== Most gold medals over career ==
This is a list of multiple Paralympic gold medalists, listing people who have won ten or more Paralympic gold medals. More medals are available in some events than others, and the number of events in which medals are available overall have changed over time.

Still active

Updated to Tokyo 2021.

This list may not be complete, as the information from the International Paralympic Committee (IPC) website is based on sources which does not present all information from earlier Paralympic Games (1960–1984), such as relay and team members.

| No. | Athlete | Nation | Sport | Years | Games | Sex | 1st place, gold medalist(s) | 2nd place, silver medalist(s) | 3rd place, bronze medalist(s) | Total |
|---|---|---|---|---|---|---|---|---|---|---|
| 1 | Trischa Zorn | United States | Swimming | 1980–2004 | Summer | F | 41 | 9 | 5 | 55 |
| 2 | Ragnhild Myklebust | Norway | Biathlon, Cross-country skiing, Ice sledge racing | 1988–2002 | Winter | F | 22 | 3 | 2 | 27 |
| 3 | Béatrice Hess | France | Swimming | 1984–2004 | Summer | F | 20 | 5 | 0 | 25 |
| 4 | Reinhild Moeller | Germany | Alpine skiing, Athletics | 1980–2006 | Winter, Summer | F | 19 | 3 | 1 | 23 |
| 6 | Michael Edgson | Canada | Swimming | 1984–1992 | Summer | M | 18 | 3 | 0 | 21 |
| 5 | Sarah Storey | Great Britain | Swimming, Cycling | 1992–2020 | Summer | F | 19 | 8 | 3 | 30 |
| 7 | Jonas Jacobsson | Sweden | Shooting | 1980–2020 | Summer | M | 17 | 4 | 9 | 30 |
| 8 | Jessica Long | United States | Swimming | 2004–2024 | Summer | F | 18 | 8 | 5 | 31 |
| 9 | Roberto Marson | Italy | Athletics, Fencing, Swimming | 1964–1976 | Summer | M | 16 | 7 | 3 | 26 |
| 10 | Gerd Schoenfelder | Germany | Alpine skiing | 1992–2010 | Winter | M | 16 | 4 | 2 | 22 |
| 11 | Mike Kenny | Great Britain | Swimming | 1976–1988 | Summer | M | 16 | 2 | 0 | 18 |
| 12 | Zipora Rubin-Rosenbaum | Israel | Athletics, Swimming, Wheelchair basketball, Table tennis | 1964–1992 | Summer | F | 15 | 9 | 7 | 31 |
| 13 | Heinz Frei | Switzerland | Athletics, Cycling, Cross-country skiing | 1984–2020 | Summer, Winter | M | 15 | 8 | 12 | 35 |
| 14 | Mayumi Narita | Japan | Swimming | 1996–2004 | Summer | F | 15 | 3 | 2 | 20 |
| 15 | Ihar Boki | Belarus | Swimming | 2012–2024 | Summer | M | 21 | 1 | 1 | 17 |
| 16 | Daniel Dias | Brazil | Swimming | 2008–2020 | Summer | M | 14 | 7 | 6 | 27 |
| 17 | Franz Nietlispach | Switzerland | Athletics | 1980–2000 | Summer | M | 14 | 6 | 2 | 22 |
| 18 | Frank Höfle | Germany | Biathlon, Cross-country skiing, Cycling | 1992–2002 | Winter, Summer | M | 14 | 5 | 5 | 24 |
| 19 | Chantal Petitclerc | Canada | Athletics | 1992–2008 | Summer | F | 14 | 5 | 2 | 21 |
| 20 | Erin Popovich | United States | Swimming | 2000–2008 | Summer | F | 14 | 5 | 0 | 19 |
| 21 | Lee Pearson | Great Britain | Equestrian | 2000–2020 | Summer | M | 14 | 2 | 1 | 17 |
| 22 | Matthew Cowdrey | Australia | Swimming | 2004–2012 | Summer | M | 13 | 7 | 3 | 23 |
| 23 | Erling Trondsen | Norway | Swimming | 1976–1992 | Summer | M | 13 | 6 | 1 | 20 |
| 24 | Claudia Hengst | Germany | Swimming | 1988–2004 | Summer | F | 13 | 4 | 8 | 25 |
| 25 | Bart Dodson | United States | Athletics | 1984–2000 | Summer | M | 13 | 3 | 4 | 20 |
| 26 | John Morgan | United States | Swimming | 1984–1992 | Summer | M | 13 | 2 | 0 | 15 |
| 26 | Natalie du Toit | South Africa | Swimming | 2004–2012 | Summer | F | 13 | 2 | 0 | 15 |
| 28 | Cato Zahl Pedersen | Norway | Athletics, Cross-country skiing, Alpine skiing | 1980–2004 | Summer, Winter | M | 13 | 1 | 0 | 14 |
| 29 | Rolf Heinzmann | Switzerland | Alpine skiing | 1980–2002 | Winter | M | 12 | 2 | 0 | 14 |
| 30 | Uri Bergman | Israel | Swimming | 1976–1988 | Summer | M | 12 | 1 | 2 | 15 |
| 31 | Sarah Will | United States | Alpine skiing | 1992–2002 | Winter | F | 12 | 1 | 0 | 13 |
| 32 | Sophie Pascoe | New Zealand | Swimming | 2008-2020 | Summer | F | 11 | 7 | 1 | 19 |
| 33 | Timothy McIsaac | Canada | Swimming | 1976–1988 | Summer | M | 11 | 6 | 4 | 21 |
| 34 | Tanni Grey-Thompson | Great Britain | Athletics | 1992–2004 | Summer | F | 11 | 4 | 1 | 16 |
| 34 | Purificacion Santamarta | Spain | Athletics | 1980–2004 | Summer | F | 11 | 4 | 1 | 16 |
| 34 | David Roberts | Great Britain | Swimming | 2000–2008 | Summer | M | 11 | 4 | 1 | 16 |
| 37 | Margaret Harriman | Rhodesia; South Africa | Archery, Swimming, Dartchery, Lawn bowls | 1960–1996 | Summer | F | 11 | 2 | 4 | 17 |
| 38 | Terje Loevaas | Norway | Cross-country skiing, Athletics | 1980–1996 | Winter, Summer | M | 10 | 5 | 3 | 18 |
| 39 | Joseph Wengier | Israel | Swimming | 1972–1988 | Summer | M | 10 | 4 | 5 | 19 |
| 40 | Isabel Newstead | Great Britain | Swimming, Shooting, Athletics | 1980–2004 | Summer | F | 10 | 4 | 4 | 18 |
| 41 | Maksym Krypak | Ukraine | Swimming | 2016–2020 | Summer | M | 10 | 4 | 1 | 15 |
| 42 | Arkadiusz Pawlowski | Poland | Swimming | 1980–2000 | Summer | M | 10 | 3 | 5 | 18 |
| 43 | Maria Scutti | Italy | Athletics, Table tennis, Swimming, Fencing | 1960 | Summer | F | 10 | 3 | 2 | 15 |
| 44 | Magdalena Tjernberg | Sweden | Swimming | 1984–1988 | Summer | F | 10 | 3 | 0 | 13 |
| 45 | Carol Bryant | Great Britain | Athletics, Table tennis, Swimming, Fencing | 1964–1976 | Summer | F | 10 | 2 | 5 | 17 |
| 45 | Elizabeth Scott | United States | Swimming | 1992–2000 | Summer | F | 10 | 2 | 5 | 17 |
| 47 | Marijke Ruiter | Netherlands | Swimming, Wheelchair basketball | 1972–1988 | Summer | F | 10 | 0 | 1 | 11 |
| 48 | Tim Sullivan | Australia | Athletics | 2000–2012 | Summer | M | 10 | 0 | 0 | 10 |

== Most gold medals in one sport ==
This is a list of Paralympians that have won at least ten gold medals in one sport. The Paralympics listed for each athlete only include games when they won medals in the specified sport.

Still active

Updated to Tokyo 2021.

This list may not be complete, as the information from the International Paralympic Committee (IPC) website is based on sources which does not present all information from earlier Paralympic Games (1960–1984), such as relay and team members.

| No. | Athlete | Nation | Sport | Years | Games | Sex | 1st place, gold medalist(s) | 2nd place, silver medalist(s) | 3rd place, bronze medalist(s) | Total |
|---|---|---|---|---|---|---|---|---|---|---|
| 1 | Trischa Zorn | United States | Swimming | 1980–2004 | Summer | F | 41 | 9 | 5 | 55 |
| 2 | Béatrice Hess | France | Swimming | 1984–2004 | Summer | F | 20 | 5 | 0 | 25 |
| 3 | Michael Edgson | Canada | Swimming | 1984–1992 | Summer | M | 18 | 3 | 0 | 21 |
| 4 | Jonas Jacobsson | Sweden | Shooting | 1980–2012 | Summer | M | 17 | 4 | 9 | 30 |
| 5 | Jessica Long | United States | Swimming | 2004–2020 | Summer | F | 16 | 8 | 5 | 29 |
| 6 | Gerd Schoenfelder | Germany | Alpine skiing | 1992–2010 | Winter | M | 16 | 4 | 2 | 22 |
| 7 | Reinhild Möller | Germany; West Germany | Alpine skiing | 1980–2006 | Winter | F | 16 | 2 | 1 | 19 |
| 8 | Mike Kenny | Great Britain | Swimming | 1976–1988 | Summer | M | 16 | 2 | 0 | 18 |
| 9 | Ragnhild Myklebust | Norway | Cross-country skiing | 1988–2002 | Winter | F | 16 | 0 | 0 | 16 |
| 10 | Mayumi Narita | Japan | Swimming | 1996–2004 | Summer | F | 15 | 3 | 2 | 20 |
| 11 | Ihar Boki | Belarus | Swimming | 2012–2020 | Summer | M | 15 | 1 | 1 | 16 |
| 12 | Daniel Dias | Brazil | Swimming | 2008–2020 | Summer | M | 14 | 7 | 6 | 27 |
| 13 | Franz Nietlispach | Switzerland | Athletics | 1980–2000 | Summer | M | 14 | 6 | 2 | 22 |
| 14 | Chantal Petitclerc | Canada | Athletics | 1992–2008 | Summer | F | 14 | 5 | 2 | 21 |
| 15 | Erin Popovich | United States | Swimming | 2000–2008 | Summer | F | 14 | 5 | 0 | 19 |
| 16 | Lee Pearson | Great Britain | Equestrian | 2000–2012 | Summer | M | 14 | 2 | 1 | 17 |
| 17 | Matthew Cowdrey | Australia | Swimming | 2004–2012 | Summer | M | 13 | 7 | 3 | 23 |
| 18 | Erling Trondsen | Norway | Swimming | 1976–1992 | Summer | M | 13 | 6 | 1 | 20 |
| 19 | Zipora Rubin-Rosenbaum | Israel | Athletics | 1964–1988 | Summer | F | 13 | 5 | 5 | 23 |
| 20 | Claudia Hengst | Germany; West Germany | Swimming | 1988–2004 | Summer | F | 13 | 4 | 8 | 25 |
| 21 | Bart Dodson | United States | Athletics | 1984–2000 | Summer | M | 13 | 3 | 4 | 20 |
| 22 | John Morgan | United States | Swimming | 1984–1992 | Summer | M | 13 | 2 | 0 | 15 |
| 22 | Natalie du Toit | South Africa | Swimming | 2004–2012 | Summer | F | 13 | 2 | 0 | 15 |
| 24 | Rolf Heinzmann | Switzerland | Alpine skiing | 1980–2002 | Winter | M | 12 | 2 | 0 | 14 |
| 25 | Uri Bergman | Israel | Swimming | 1976–1988 | Summer | M | 12 | 1 | 2 | 15 |
| 26 | Sarah Will | United States | Alpine skiing | 1992–2002 | Winter | F | 12 | 1 | 0 | 13 |
| 27 | Sarah Storey | Great Britain | Cycling | 2008-2020 | Summer | F | 12 | 0 | 0 | 12 |
| 28 | Sophie Pascoe | New Zealand | Swimming | 2008-2020 | Summer | F | 11 | 7 | 1 | 19 |
| 29 | Heinz Frei | Switzerland | Athletics | 1984–2000 | Summer | M | 11 | 6 | 5 | 22 |
| 30 | Timothy McIsaac | Canada | Swimming | 1976–1988 | Summer | M | 11 | 6 | 4 | 21 |
| 31 | Purificacion Santamarta | Spain | Athletics | 1980–2004 | Summer | F | 11 | 4 | 1 | 16 |
| 31 | David Roberts | Great Britain | Swimming | 2000–2008 | Summer | M | 11 | 4 | 1 | 16 |
| 31 | Tanni Grey-Thompson | Great Britain | Athletics | 1992–2004 | Summer | F | 11 | 4 | 1 | 16 |
| 34 | Frank Höfle | Germany; West Germany | Cross-country skiing | 1988–2006 | Winter | M | 10 | 5 | 2 | 17 |
| 35 | Joseph Wengier | Israel | Swimming | 1972–1988 | Summer | M | 10 | 4 | 5 | 19 |
| 36 | Maksym Krypak | Ukraine | Swimming | 2016–2020 | Summer | M | 10 | 4 | 1 | 15 |
| 37 | Arkadiusz Pawlowski | Poland | Swimming | 1980–2000 | Summer | M | 10 | 3 | 5 | 18 |
| 38 | Isabel Newstead | Great Britain | Swimming | 1980–2004 | Summer | F | 10 | 3 | 1 | 14 |
| 39 | Terje Loevaas | Norway | Cross-country skiing | 1980–1994 | Winter | M | 10 | 3 | 0 | 13 |
| 39 | Magdalena Tjernberg | Sweden | Swimming | 1984–1988 | Summer | F | 10 | 3 | 0 | 13 |
| 41 | Elizabeth Scott | United States | Swimming | 1992–2000 | Summer | F | 10 | 2 | 5 | 17 |
| 42 | Marijke Ruiter | Netherlands | Swimming | 1972–1976 | Summer | F | 10 | 0 | 0 | 10 |
| 42 | Tim Sullivan | Australia | Athletics | 2000–2008 | Summer | M | 10 | 0 | 0 | 10 |

== See also ==
- List of multiple Olympic gold medalists
- List of multiple Olympic gold medalists at a single Games
- List of multiple Olympic gold medalists in one event
- List of multiple Paralympic gold medalists at a single Games
