= List of Paralympic medalists in swimming =

Swimming is one of the original Paralympic sports started at the 1960 Summer Paralympics, and is still contested.

== Classification ==
In swimming, there are ten sport classes which range between physical impairment (such as paraplegia and blindness).

Class	Criteria	Notable swimmers (with their medals)	Swimming events under category
S1	Swimmers have a significant loss of power or control in legs, arms and hands. Some athletes may also have limited trunk control. This could be caused by tetraplegia, polio or similar disabilities. Swimmers who are in this class use a wheelchair in daily life.	Izhak Mamistvalov (ISR) (2-1-1)	50 metre freestyle 50 metre backstroke 100 metre freestyle
S2/SB2	Swimmers in this sport class mainly rely on their arms for swimming. Their hand, trunk and leg function is limited due to tetraplegia or other co-ordination problems.	Jim Anderson (GBR) (6-9-2); Sara Carracelas Garcia (ESP) (6-1-3)	50 metre backstroke 50 metre breaststroke 50 metre freestyle 100 metre freestyle 200 metre freestyle
S3/SB2/SM3	This sport class includes swimmers who have arm and/or leg amputations. Swimmers with reasonable arm strokes but no use of their legs or trunk and have severe co-ordination problems in all limbs are included in this sport.	Miguel Luque (ESP) (2-2-2)	50 metre backstroke 50 metre breaststroke 50 metre freestyle 100 metre freestyle 200 metre freestyle 150 metre individual medley
S4/SB3/SM4	Swimmers who can use their arms and have fair function in their hands but who cannot use their trunk or legs. Athletes with amputations of three limbs are allowed to swim in this sport.	Mayumi Narita (JPN) (15-3-2); Clodoaldo Silva (BRA) (6-5-2)	50 metre backstroke 50 metre butterfly 50 metre freestyle 100 metre breaststroke 100 metre freestyle 200 metre freestyle 150 metre individual medley
S5/SB4/SM5	Swimmers with short stature and an additional impairment with loss of control over one side of their body (hemiplegia) or with paraplegia.	Sebastián Rodríguez (ESP) (8-3-4); Béatrice Hess (FRA) (20-5-0)	50 metre backstroke 50 metre butterfly 50 metre freestyle 100 metre freestyle 200 metre freestyle 200 metre individual medley
S6/SB5/SM6	Similar to S5 but have amputations of both arms and have moderate co-ordination problems on one side of their body. Competitors who have dwarfism compete in this class.	He Junquan (CHN) (7-3-2); Nyree Lewis (GBR) (2-5-3)	50 metre butterfly 50 metre freestyle 100 metre backstroke 100 metre breaststroke 100 metre freestyle 400 metre freestyle 200 metre individual medley
S7/SB6/SM7	This class is for swimmers who have one arm and one leg amputation or paralysis on opposite sides. Moreover, swimmers with full control over arms and trunks and some leg function can compete in this class.	David Roberts (GBR) (11-4-1); Erin Popovich (USA) (14-5-0)	50 metre butterfly 50 metre freestyle 100 metre backstroke 100 metre breaststroke 100 metre freestyle 400 metre freestyle 200 metre individual medley
S8/SB7/SM8	Swimmers who have an amputation of one arms are eligible to compete in this sport class. Also, swimmers with significant restrictions across hip, knee and ankle joints could compete.	Jessica Long (USA) (13-6-4)	50 metre freestyle 100 metre backstroke 100 metre breaststroke 400 metre freestyle 200 metre individual medley
S9/SB8/SM9	Swimmers who have joint restrictions in one leg or double below-the-knee amputations such as cerebral palsy and dystonia.	Matt Cowdrey (AUS) (13-7-3); Natalie du Toit (RSA) (13-2-0)	50 metre freestyle 100 metre backstroke 100 metre breaststroke 100 metre butterfly 100 metre freestyle 400 metre freestyle 200 metre individual medley
S10/SB9/SM10	Swimmers who have minimal physical impairments, for example the loss of one hand or a movement restriction in one hip joint.	Benoît Huot (CAN) (9-5-6); Claudia Hengst (GER) (13-4-8)	50 metre freestyle 100 metre backstroke 100 metre breaststroke 100 metre butterfly 100 metre freestyle 400 metre freestyle 200 metre individual medley
S11/SB11/SM11	Swimmers who have very low acuity and/or no light perception.	Junichi Kawai (JPN) (5-9-7); Daniela Schulte (GER) (3-4-1)	50 metre freestyle 100 metre backstroke 100 metre butterfly 100 metre freestyle 400 metre freestyle
S12/SB12/SM12	Swimmers who have higher visual acuity than athletes in the S11 class and/or a visual field of less than 5 degrees radius.	Maksym Veraksa (UKR) (7-0-2); Oxana Savchenko (RUS) (8-0-0)	50 metre freestyle 100 metre backstroke 100 metre breaststroke 100 metre butterfly 100 metre freestyle 400 metre freestyle 200 metre individual medley
S13/SB13/SM13	Swimmers who have the least severe visual impairment, for example albinism. They have the highest visual acuity and/or a visual field of less than 20 degrees radius.	Charalampos Taiganidis (GRE) (4-4-2); Kirby Cote (CAN) (7-6-0)	50 metre freestyle 100 metre backstroke 100 metre breaststroke 100 metre butterfly 400 metre freestyle 200 metre individual medley
S14/SB14/SM14	Swimmers who have an intellectual impairment, for example autism and other learning disabilities, which typically leads to athletes having difficulties with regards to pattern recognition, sequencing and memory or having a slower reaction time which can impact on sport performance in general. Moreover, these classed swimmers show a high number of strokes relative to their speed than other able-bodied elite swimmers.	Bethany Firth (GBR)/Ireland (6-3-0)	100 metre breaststroke 100 metre butterfly 200 metre freestyle 200 metre individual medley

== Events ==
Paralympic swimmers participate in four different lengths: 50 metre, 100 metre, 150 metre (SM3 individual medley events) 200 metre and 400 metre (individual medley events). In the beginning of the Paralympic Games, they competed in three lengths: 25 metre, 50 metre and 75 metre events, 25 metre and 75 metre events were abolished in the 1988 Summer Paralympics.

== See also ==
- Paralympic swimming
- List of Paralympic records in swimming
- List of Olympic medalists in swimming
