= United States at the Paralympics =

- Flag of the United States
- IPC code: USA
- NPC: United States Olympic & Paralympic Committee
- Website: www.teamusa.org/US-Paralympics
- Medals Ranked 1st: Gold 962 Silver 910 Bronze 854 Total 2,726

Summer appearances
- 1960; 1964; 1968; 1972; 1976; 1980; 1984; 1988; 1992; 1996; 2000; 2004; 2008; 2012; 2016; 2020; 2024

Winter appearances
- 1976; 1980; 1984; 1988; 1992; 1994; 1998; 2002; 2006; 2010; 2014; 2018; 2022; 2026

The United States of America (USA), represented by the United States Olympic & Paralympic Committee, has participated in every Summer and Winter Paralympic Games and is currently first on the all-time medal table. The nation used to be a dominant Paralympic power in the 1960s, 1970s, and 1980s, but has steadily declined since the 1990s to a point where it finished sixth in the 2012 Summer Paralympics medal count. The team then improved to a fourth-place finish in 2016, and third in 2020, and unexpectedly finished first at the 2018 Winter Paralympics.

The United States was the co-host of the 1984 Summer Paralympics in Stoke Mandeville and New York. It also hosted the 1996 Summer Paralympics in Atlanta and 2002 Winter Paralympics in Salt Lake City.

== Medal tables ==
Red border color indicates host nation status.

=== Medals by Summer Games ===
Games	Gold	Silver	Bronze	Total	Rank by Gold medals	Rank by Total medals
(Italy) 1960 Rome	11	7	7	25	5	5
(Japan) 1964 Tokyo	50	41	32	123	1	1
(Israel) 1968 Tel-Aviv	33	27	39	99	1	1
(West Germany) 1972 Heidelberg	17	27	31	75	2	1
(Canada) 1976 Toronto	66	44	45	155	1	1
(Netherlands) 1980 Arnhem	75	66	54	195	1	1
(United States) 1984 New York (United Kingdom) 1984 Stoke Mandeville	137	131	129	397	1	1
(South Korea) 1988 Seoul	91	90	88	269	1	1
(Spain) 1992 Barcelona	75	52	48	175	1	1
(United States) 1996 Atlanta	46	46	65	157	1	1
(Australia) 2000 Sydney	36	39	34	109	5	3
(Greece) 2004 Athens	27	22	39	88	4	4
(China) 2008 Beijing	36	35	28	99	3	3
(United Kingdom) 2012 London	31	29	38	98	6	4
(Brazil) 2016 Rio de Janeiro	40	44	31	115	4	4
(Japan) 2020 Tokyo	37	36	31	104	3	4
(France) 2024 Paris	36	42	27	105	3	3
(United States) 2028 Los Angeles	Future event					
(Australia) 2032 Brisbane	Future event					
Total	844	778	766	2388	1	1

=== Medals by Winter Games ===
Games	Gold	Silver	Bronze	Total	Rank by Gold medals	Rank by Total medals
(Sweden) 1976 Örnsköldsvik	0	0	0	0	–	–
(Norway) 1980 Geilo	4	1	1	6	6	7
(Austria) 1984 Innsbruck	7	14	14	35	5	4
(Austria) 1988 Innsbruck	7	17	6	30	6	4
(France) 1992 Tignes-Albertville	20	16	9	45	1	1
(Norway) 1994 Lillehammer	24	12	7	43	3	3
(Japan) 1998 Nagano	13	8	13	34	3	4
(United States) 2002 Salt Lake City	10	22	11	43	2	1
(Italy) 2006 Turin	7	2	3	12	5	7
(Canada) 2010 Vancouver	4	5	4	13	6	5
(Russia) 2014 Sochi	2	7	9	18	8	3
(South Korea) 2018 Pyeongchang	13	15	8	36	1	1
(China) 2022 Beijing	6	11	3	20	5	4
(Italy) 2026 Milan-Cortina	13	5	6	24	2	2
(France) 2030 French Alps	Future event					
(United States) 2034 Salt Lake City	Future event					
Total	130	135	92	357	2	2

=== Medals by summer sport ===
Leading in that sport

Sport	Gold	Silver	Bronze	Total
Athletics	390	383	385	1,158
Swimming	294	231	227	752
Archery	22	8	16	46
Road cycling	19	28	20	67
Wrestling	15	2	0	17
Table tennis	14	15	24	53
Wheelchair basketball	13	2	8	23
Equestrian	9	8	3	20
Track cycling	7	13	12	32
Weightlifting	7	9	9	25
Wheelchair tennis	6	7	4	17
Powerlifting	6	3	5	14
Paratriathlon	5	3	1	9
Goalball	3	6	3	12
Dartchery	3	3	2	8
Wheelchair rugby	3	2	2	7
Judo	2	7	13	22
Lawn bowls	2	3	7	12
Boccia	2	2	3	7
Volleyball	2	2	1	5
Sailing	1	3	3	7
Shooting	1	1	3	5
Football 7-a-side	1	0	0	1
Rowing	0	3	2	5
Snooker	0	2	0	2
Wheelchair fencing	0	1	2	3
Paracanoeing	0	1	1	2
Badminton	0	1	0	1
Parataekwondo	0	0	2	2
Totals (29 entries)	827	749	758	2,334

The United States has never won a Paralympic medal in the following current summer sport or discipline: football 5-a-side.

=== Medals by winter sport ===
Leading in that sport

Sport	Gold	Silver	Bronze	Total
Alpine skiing	92	97	70	259
Cross-country skiing	9	20	10	39
Snowboarding	6	7	4	17
Biathlon	5	6	3	14
Para ice hockey	5	0	1	6
Totals (5 entries)	117	130	88	335

The United States has never won a Paralympic medal in the following current winter sport: wheelchair curling.

Best results in non-medalling sports:

Summer
Sport	Rank	Athlete	Event & Year
Football 5-a-side	Did not participate		
Winter
Sport	Rank	Athlete	Event & Year
Wheelchair curling	4th	Augusto Perez; Patrick McDonald; James Pierce; Jacqui Kapinowski; James Joseph; Steve Brown	Mixed tournament in 2010

== Flagbearers ==
Summer Paralympics
Games	Athlete	Sport
(Italy) 1960 Rome	Not documented	
(Japan) 1964 Tokyo	Not documented	
(Israel) 1968 Tel-Aviv	Not documented	
(West Germany) 1972 Heidelberg	Not documented	
(Canada) 1976 Toronto	Not documented	
(Netherlands) 1980 Arnhem	Not documented	
(United States) 1984 New York (United Kingdom) 1984 Stoke Mandeville	Not documented	
(South Korea) 1988 Seoul	Not documented	
(Spain) 1992 Barcelona	Not documented	
(United States) 1996 Atlanta	Not documented	
(Australia) 2000 Sydney	Mike Dempsey	Table tennis
(Greece) 2004 Athens	Kevin Szott	Judo
(China) 2008 Beijing	Jennifer Armbruster	Goalball
(United Kingdom) 2012 London	Scott Danberg	Athletics
(Brazil) 2016 Rio de Janeiro	Allison Jones	Cycling
(Japan) 2020 Tokyo	Chuck Aoki	Wheelchair rugby
(Japan) 2020 Tokyo	Melissa Stockwell	Paratriathlon
(France) 2024 Paris	Steve Serio	Wheelchair basketball
(France) 2024 Paris	Nicky Nieves	Sitting volleyball

Winter Paralympics
Games	Athlete	Sport
(Sweden) 1976 Örnsköldsvik	Not documented	
(Norway) 1980 Geilo	Not documented	
(Austria) 1984 Innsbruck	Not documented	
(Austria) 1988 Innsbruck	Not documented	
(France) 1992 Tignes-Albertville	Not documented	
(Norway) 1994 Lillehammer	Not documented	
(Japan) 1998 Nagano	Not documented	
(United States) 2002 Salt Lake City	Not documented	
(Italy) 2006 Turin	Chris Devlin-Young	Alpine skiing
(Canada) 2010 Vancouver	Heath Calhoun	Alpine skiing
(Russia) 2014 Sochi	Jonathan Lujan	Alpine skiing
(South Korea) 2018 PyeongChang	Mike Schultz	Snowboarding
(China) 2022 Beijing	Tyler Carter	Alpine skiing
(China) 2022 Beijing	Danelle Umstead	Alpine skiing

== Records ==
=== Summer Paralympics ===
==== Multi-medalists ====
Athletes who have won at least three gold medals or five medals at the Summer Paralympics. Bold athletes are athletes who are still active.

No.	Athlete	Sport	Years	Games	Gender	Gold	Silver	Bronze	Total
1	Trischa Zorn	Swimming	1980–2004	7	F	41	9	5	55
2	**Jessica Long**	Swimming	2004–2020	5	F	16	8	5	29
3	Erin Popovich	Swimming	2000–2008	3	F	14	5	0	19
4	Bart Dodson	Athletics	1984–2000	5	M	13	3	4	20
5	John Morgan	Swimming	1984, 1992	2	M	13	2	0	15
5	Elizabeth Scott	Swimming	1992–2000	3	F	10	2	5	17
6	Edward Owen	Athletics; Swimming	1964–1988	7	M	9	2	2	13
7	**Tatyana McFadden**	Athletics	2004–2020	5	F	8	7	4	19
8	**Brad Snyder**	Swimming	2012–2020	3	M	6	2	0	8
9	Jean Driscoll	Athletics	1988–2000	4	F	5	3	4	12
10	Marla Runyan	Athletics	1992–1996	2	F	5	1	0	6
11	David Larson	Athletics	1988–2000	4	M	5	0	3	8
12	Dennis Oehler	Athletics	1988–1996	3	M	4	3	3	10
13	Brian Frasure	Athletics	2000–2008	3	M	4	3	2	9
14	Tony Volpentest	Athletics	1992–2000	3	M	4	1	0	5
15	Paul Nitz	Athletics	1992–2012	6	M	4	0	1	5
16	Danny Andrews	Athletics	2000–2008	3	M	4	0	0	4
16	Raymond Martin	Athletics	2012	1	M	4	0	0	4
18	David Wagner	Wheelchair tennis	2004–2016	4	M	3	3	2	8
19	Freeman Register	Athletics	1992–2000	3	M	3	1	2	6
20	**Mallory Weggemann**	Swimming	2012–2020	3	F	3	1	1	6
21	**Nick Mayhugh**	Athletics	2020	1	M	3	1	0	4
22	Kelley Becherer	Swimming	2008–2012	2	F	3	0	4	7
23	Justin Zook	Swimming	2004–2012	3	M	3	0	1	4
24	Royal Mitchell	Athletics	2000–2008	3	M	3	0	0	3
25	Jeremy Campbell	Athletics	2008–2012	2	M	3	0	0	3
26	Ross Davis	Athletics	1992–2000	3	M	2	4	3	9
27	Cheri Madsen	Athletics	1996–2016	6	F	2	4	2	8
28	**Roy Perkins**	Swimming	2008–2016	3	M	2	3	3	8
29	Scot Hollonbeck	Athletics	1992–2004	4	M	2	3	0	5
30	Gregory Burns	Swimming	1996–2000	3	M	2	2	1	5
31	Marlon Shirley	Athletics	2000–2008	3	M	2	2	1	5
32	Karissa Whitsell	Cycling	2004–2008	2	F	2	1	2	5
33	**Cortney Jordan**	Swimming	2008–2016	3	F	1	8	3	12
34	**Amanda McGrory**	Athletics	2008–2016	3	F	1	2	4	7
35	Cheri Blauwet	Athletics	2000–2008	3	F	1	1	4	6
36	Aimee Bruder	Swimming	1996–2008	4	F	0	1	4	5

==== Multi-gold medalists at single Games ====
This is a list of athletes who have won at least two gold medals in a single Games. Ordered categorically by gold medals earned, sports, then year.

No.	Athlete	Sport	Year	Gender	Gold	Silver	Bronze	Total
Athletics
1	David Larson	Athletics	1992	M	4	0	0	4
1	Marla Runyan	Athletics	1992	F	4	0	0	4
3	Danny Andrews	Athletics	2004	M	3	0	0	3
4	Dennis Oehler	Athletics	1988	M	3	0	1	4
5	Jean Driscoll	Athletics	1996	F	2	1	1	4
6	Curt Brinkman	Athletics	1980	M	2	1	0	3
6	Joe Gaetani	Athletics	1992	M	2	1	0	3
8	Maureen Gaynor	Athletics	1988	F	2	0	0	2
Cycling
1	Karissa Whitsell; Guide: Katie Compton	Cycling	2004	F	2	1	1	4
2	Barbara Buchan	Cycling	2008	F	2	0	0	2
Swimming
1	Trischa Zorn	Swimming	1988	F	12	0	0	12
2	John Morgan	Swimming	1992	M	8	2	0	10
3	Erin Popovich	Swimming	2004	F	7	0	0	7
3	Elizabeth Scott	Swimming	1992	F	7	0	0	7
5	**Jessica Long**	Swimming	2012	F	5	2	1	7
6	**McKenzie Coan**	Swimming	2016	F	3	1	0	4
6	**Rebecca Meyers**	Swimming	2016	F	3	1	0	4
6	**Brad Snyder**	Swimming	2016	M	3	1	0	4
9	Gregory Burns	Swimming	1996	M	2	1	0	3
10	Kelley Becherer	Swimming	2012	F	2	0	2	4
Wheelchair tennis
1	Randy Snow	Wheelchair tennis	1992	M	2	0	0	2
Multiple sports
1	Ed Owen	Athletics	1968	M	4	0	1	7
1	Ed Owen	Swimming	1968	M	2	0	0	7
2	Sharon Hedrick	Athletics	1980	F	3	1	0	5
2	Sharon Hedrick	Wheelchair basketball	1980	F	0	0	1	5

==== Multi-medalists at single event ====
This is a list of athletes who have won at least three medals in a single event at the Summer Paralympics. Ordered categorically by medals earned, sports, then gold medals earned.

No.	Athlete	Sport	Event	Years	Games	Gender	Gold	Silver	Bronze	Total
1	Trischa Zorn	Swimming	100m backstroke	1980–2004	7	F	5	1	1	7
2	**Jessica Long**	Swimming	400m freestyle	2004–2016	4	F	3	1	0	4
3	Ross Davis	Athletics	100 metres	1992–2000	3	M	2	1	0	3
3	Bart Dodson	Athletics	200 metres	1992–2000	3	M	2	1	0	3
3	**Rudy Garcia-Tolson**	Swimming	200m individual medley	2004–2012	3	M	2	1	0	3
3	**Roy Perkins**	Swimming	50m butterfly	2008–2016	3	M	2	1	0	3
7	David Larson	Athletics	400 metres	1988–1996	3	M	2	0	1	3

==== Athletes with most appearances ====
===== Summer Paralympics =====
This is a list of athletes who have competed in four or more Summer Paralympics. Active athletes are in bold. Athletes under 15 years of age and over 40 years of age are in bold.

No.	Athlete	Sport	Birth Year	Games Years	First/Last Age	Gender	Gold	Silver	Bronze	Total
1	Pamela Fontaine	Table tennis Wheelchair basketball	1964	1984–2016	20 - **52**	F	0	1	1	2
2	Trischa Zorn	Swimming	1964	1980–2004	16 - 40	F	44	9	5	55
3	Lex Gillette	Athletics	1984	2004–2016	20 - 32	M	0	4	0	4

== Prize money ==
When a US athlete wins an Olympic medal, as of 2016, the USOPC paid the winner $25,000 for gold, $15,000 for silver, and $10,000 for bronze. The USOPC increased the payouts by 25% to $37,000 for gold, $22,500 for silver, and $15,000 for bronze beginning in 2017. These numbers are significantly lower than in other countries, where Olympic gold medalists receive up to $1 million from their governments for a gold medal. Since 2018, payouts to Paralympic athletes have been the same as to the Olympians. The International Paralympic Committee noted that "'Operation Gold Awards' for [American] Paralympic athletes [would] be increased by as much as 400 percent."

== See also ==
- United States at the Olympics
