= Canada at the Paralympics =

- Flag of Canada
- IPC code: CAN
- NPC: Canadian Paralympic Committee
- Website: www.paralympic.ca
- Medals Ranked 4th: Gold 410 Silver 349 Bronze 356 Total 1,115

Summer appearances
- 1968; 1972; 1976; 1980; 1984; 1988; 1992; 1996; 2000; 2004; 2008; 2012; 2016; 2020; 2024

Winter appearances
- 1976; 1980; 1984; 1988; 1992; 1994; 1998; 2002; 2006; 2010; 2014; 2018; 2022; 2026

Canada has participated eleven times in the Summer Paralympic Games and in all Winter Paralympic Games. They first competed at the Summer Games in 1960 and the Winter Games in 1976.

== Milestones ==
Canada competed at the 1960 Summer Paralympics in Rome, Italy with a delegation consisted of one competitor, Franz Bronnenhuber, who took part in athletics and table tennis.

At the 2000 Summer Paralympics, Stephanie Dixon set the Canadian record for most gold medals at a single Paralympics, Winter or Summer, with five.

At the 2002 Winter Paralympics, Canada set a new total Canadian gold medal record haul at a Winter Paralympics, with six.

At the 2004 Summer Paralympics, Chantal Petitclerc & Benoit Huot tied the five gold medal record at a single Games. Petitclerc also won the demonstration sport of Wheelchair Racing in the 2004 Summer Olympics.

At the 2008 Summer Paralympics, Chantal Petitclerc again tied the five gold medal record at a single Games.

In 2010, Brian McKeever of Canada became the first athlete in the world to be named to the Winter Paralympics and Winter Olympics teams in the same year. At the 2010 Winter Olympics, he was scheduled to compete in the men's 50 km cross-country race.

At the 2010 Winter Paralympics, Viviane Forest became the first para-athlete to win a gold in both the Winter and Summer Games, by winning the Women's Downhill for Visually Impaired. She had previously won gold in the 2000 and 2004 Summer Paralympics for women's goalball.

Lauren Woolstencroft became the first Canadian to win three gold medals at the same Winter Paralympics, at the 2010 edition; this was eventually upped to five golds. With her fourth gold medal, she helped Canada set a record for most gold medals at any Winter Paralympic Games by winning the seventh medal. The previous mark was six, set at the 2002 Salt Lake City Paralympics. With her fifth gold medal, she set the record for most gold medals won by any Winter Paralympian at a single Games, and she tied the record for gold medal haul of any Canadian Paralympian at a single Games, tying Chantal Petitclerc (who did the feat twice), Dixon, and Benoit Huot both Summer Paralympians. Her five gold medals are also the record for any Canadian Winter Paralympian or Olympian.

At the 2010 Games, Canada collected the most total medals and the most gold medals of any Winter Paralympics, up through 2010 for Canada, with 19 total medals, and 10 golds.

At the 2018 Winter Paralympics, cross country skier McKeever became Canada's most decorated Winter Paralympian when he won a 14th medal in five Games from 2002 to 2018, passing the late Lana Spreeman, who won 13 medals in para-alpine skiing between 1980 and 1994.

== Hosting the Games ==
Canada has hosted the Games twice.

Games	Host city	Dates	Nations	Participants	Events
1976 Summer Paralympics	Toronto	August 3 to August 11, 1976	32	1657	447 in 13 sports
2010 Winter Paralympics	Vancouver	March 12 to March 21, 2010	44	506	64 in 5 sports

In 1976, and in 2010, Canada also hosted the Olympic Games counterpart, the 1976 Summer Olympics and the 2010 Winter Olympics respectively. Canada did not host the Paralympic Games counterpart to the 1988 Winter Olympics in Calgary, Alberta; this was the last Winter Olympics that the host city did not also host the Winter Paralympics. The 1988 Summer Paralympics was the first Paralympics to be linked to the hosting of the Summer Olympics. The 1976 Summer Olympics were hosted in Montreal, and not linked to the Toronto Paralympiad.

== Medals ==
The ranking in these table is based on information provided by the International Paralympic Committee (IPC) and is consistent with IPC convention in its published medal tables, ordered first of all by the number of gold medals the athletes from a nation have won, followed by the number of silver medals and then the number of bronze medals.

== Medal tables ==
Red border colour indicates host nation status.

=== Medals by Summer Games ===
Games	Gold	Silver	Bronze	Total	Rank by Gold medals	Rank by Total medals
(Italy) 1960 Rome	0	0	0	0	-	-
(Israel) 1968 Tel-Aviv	6	6	7	19	12	12
(Germany) 1972 Heidelberg	5	6	8	19	13	10
(Canada) 1976 Toronto	25	26	26	77	6	6
(Netherlands) 1980 Arnhem	64	35	31	130	4	4
(United States) 1984 New York (United Kingdom) 1984 Stoke Mandeville	87	82	69	238	3	3
(South Korea) 1988 Seoul	55	42	55	130	4	4
(Spain) 1992 Barcelona	29	23	29	81	7	7
(United States) 1996 Atlanta	24	21	24	69	7	7
(Australia) 2000 Sydney	38	35	25	98	3	5
(Greece) 2004 Athens	28	19	25	72	3	7
(China) 2008 Beijing	19	10	21	50	7	10
(United Kingdom) 2012 London	7	15	9	31	20	13
(Brazil) 2016 Rio de Janeiro	8	10	11	29	14	14
(Japan) 2020 Tokyo	5	10	6	21	23	19
(France) 2024 Paris	10	9	10	29	13	12
(United States) 2028 Los Angeles	Future event					
(Australia) 2032 Brisbane	Future event					
Total	410	349	356	1115	4	7

=== Medals by Winter Games ===
Games	Gold	Silver	Bronze	Total	Rank by Gold medals	Rank by Total medals
(Sweden) 1976 Örnsköldsvik	2	0	2	4	9	8
(Norway) 1980 Geilo	2	3	1	6	8	7
(Austria) 1984 Innsbruck	2	8	4	14	10	8
(Austria) 1988 Innsbruck	5	3	5	13	8	9
(France) 1992 Tignes-Albertville	2	4	6	12	9	9
(Norway) 1994 Lillehammer	1	2	5	8	14	13
(Japan) 1998 Nagano	1	9	5	15	15	10
(United States) 2002 Salt Lake City	6	4	5	15	6	7
(Italy) 2006 Turin	5	3	5	13	6	6
(Canada) 2010 Vancouver	10	5	4	19	3	3
(Russia) 2014 Sochi	7	2	7	16	3	4
(South Korea) 2018 Pyeongchang	8	4	16	28	3	2
(China) 2022 Beijing	8	6	11	25	3	3
(Italy) 2026 Milan-Cortina	3	4	8	15	8	7
(France) 2030 Alps	Future event					
(United States) 2034 Utah	Future event					
Total	62	57	84	203	8	7

=== Medals by summer sport ===
Medals by sport

Leading in that sport

Sport	Gold	Silver	Bronze	Total
Athletics	198	162	166	526
Swimming	163	123	123	409
Road cycling	9	8	9	26
Wheelchair basketball	6	1	1	8
Lawn bowls	4	1	2	7
Wrestling	3	7	0	10
Shooting	3	3	1	7
Archery	3	0	1	4
Goalball	2	1	3	6
Boccia	1	3	5	9
Equestrian	1	2	6	9
Table tennis	1	1	4	6
Sailing	1	1	2	4
Snooker	1	0	0	1
Track cycling	0	5	5	10
Powerlifting	0	3	0	3
Wheelchair rugby	0	2	1	3
Football 7-a-side	0	1	0	1
Paratriathlon	0	1	0	1
Volleyball	0	1	0	1
Judo	0	0	4	4
Rowing	0	0	1	1
Totals (22 entries)	396	326	334	1,056

=== Medals by winter sport ===
Medals by sport

Leading in that sport

Sport	Gold	Silver	Bronze	Total
Alpine skiing	27	38	49	114
Cross-country skiing	25	7	14	46
Wheelchair curling	3	0	2	5
Biathlon	2	3	8	13
Para ice hockey	1	3	2	6
Snowboarding	1	1	0	2
Totals (6 entries)	59	52	75	186

Best results in non-medaling sports:

Summer
Sport	Rank	Athlete	Event & Year
Badminton	8th	Olivia Meier	Women's singles SL4 in 2020
Football 5-a-side	did not participate		
Parataekwondo	did not participate		
Wheelchair fencing	5th	Trinity Lowthian	Women's épée B in 2024
Wheelchair tennis	4th	Sarah Hunter & Brian McPhate	Quad doubles in 2004

== Records ==
=== Summer Paralympics ===
==== Multi medalists ====
This is a list of Canadian athletes who have won at least three gold medals or five medals at the Summer Paralympics. Bold athletes are athletes who are still in active.

No.	Athlete	Sport	Years	Games	Gender	Gold	Silver	Bronze	Total
1	Michael Edgson	Swimming	1984-1992	3	M	18	3	0	21
2	Chantal Petitclerc	Athletics	1992-2008	5	F	14	5	2	21
3	**Benoît Huot**	Swimming	2000-2016	5	M	9	5	6	20
4	Walter Wu	Swimming	1996-2004	3	M	9	4	2	15
5	Stephanie Dixon	Swimming	2000-2008	3	F	7	8	2	17
6	Arnold Boldt	Athletics	1976-1992, 2012	6	M	7	1	0	8
7	Joanne Mucz	Swimming	1984-1992	3	F	6	2	0	8
8	Lisa Franks	Athletics	2000-2008	3	F	6	1	0	7
8	Jessica Sloan	Swimming	2000	1	F	6	1	0	7
8	Michelle Stilwell	Athletics; Wheelchair basketball	2000-2016	5	F	6	1	0	7
11	Joanne Bouw	Athletics	1984-1996	4	F	5	0	2	7
12	**Aurelie Rivard**	Swimming	2012-2024	4	F	6	4	3	13
13	Eugene Reimer	Athletics	1968-1980	4	M	4	5	2	11
14	Valerie Grand'Maison	Swimming	2008-2012	2	F	4	4	0	8
15	Jacques Martin	Athletics	1984-2000	5	M	4	3	2	9
16	Andre Viger	Athletics	1980-1996	5	M	3	3	4	10
17	Danielle Campo	Swimming	2000-2004	2	F	3	2	2	7
18	Rick Hansen	Athletics	1980-1984	2	M	3	2	1	6
19	Philippe Gagnon	Swimming	2000	1	M	3	1	0	4
20	Andre Beaudoin	Athletics	1988-2008	6	M	2	7	6	15
21	Marc Quessy	Athletics	1988-1996	3	M	1	5	2	8
22	**Brent Lakatos**	Athletics	2012-2024	2	M	2	9	2	13
23	John Belanger	Athletics	1984-1988	2	M	0	4	0	4
24	Joyce Murland	Athletics; Shooting	1972-1976	2	F	0	2	3	5

==== Multi golds at single Games ====
This is a list of Canadian athletes who have won at least two gold medals in a single Games. Ordered categorically by gold medals earned, sports then year.

No.	Athlete	Sport	Year	Gender	Gold	Silver	Bronze	Total
Athletics
1	Tham Simpson	Athletics	1984	F	5	0	0	5
2	Lisa Franks	Athletics	2000	F	4	1	0	5
3	Jamie Bone	Athletics	1988	M	3	0	1	4
4	Laura Misciagna	Athletics	1980	F	3	0	0	3
4	Richard Reelie	Athletics	1988	M	3	0	0	3
4	Frank Bruno	Athletics	1992	M	3	0	0	3
6	Eugene Reimer	Athletics	1968	M	2	1	0	3
6	Rick Hansen	Athletics	1984	M	2	1	0	3
8	James Shaw	Athletics	1996	M	2	0	1	3
Swimming
1	Michael Edgson	Swimming	1988	M	9	0	0	9
2	Jessica Sloan	Swimming	2000	F	6	1	0	7
3	Walter Wu	Swimming	1996	M	6	0	1	7
4	Stephanie Dixon	Swimming	2000	F	5	2	0	7
5	Joanne Mucz	Swimming	1992	F	5	0	0	5
6	Valerie Grand'Maison	Swimming	2008	F	3	2	0	5
7	Danielle Campo	Swimming	2000	F	3	1	0	4
7	Philippe Gagnon	Swimming	2000	M	3	1	0	4
7	**Aurelie Rivard**	Swimming	2016	F	3	1	0	4
10	Summer Mortimer	Swimming	2012	F	2	1	1	4
Multiple sports
1	Martha Gustafson	Athletics	1984	F	5	0	0	7
1	Martha Gustafson	Swimming	1984	F	1	1	0	7

==== Multi medals at single event ====
This is a list of Canadian athletes who have won at least three medals in a single event at the Summer Paralympics. Ordered categorically by medals earned, sports then gold medals earned.

No.	Athlete	Sport	Event	Years	Games	Gender	Gold	Silver	Bronze	Total
1	Arnold Boldt	Athletics	High jump	1976-1992	5	M	5	0	0	5
2	**Benoît Huot**	Swimming	200m individual medley	2000-2016	5	M	5	0	1	6
3	Martha Gustafson	Athletics	Discus throw	1976-1984	3	F	3	0	0	3
4	Walter Wu	Swimming	400m freestyle	1996-2004	3	M	2	1	0	3
4	Kirby Cote	Swimming	200m individual medley	2000-2008	3	F	2	1	0	3

==== Most appearances ====
This is a list of Canadian athletes who have competed in four or more Summer Paralympics. Active athletes are in bold. Athletes who were aged under 15 years of age and over 40 years of age are in bold.

No.	Athlete	Sport	Birth Year	Games Years	First/Last Age	Gender	Gold	Silver	Bronze	Total
1	Chris Daw	Athletics, Rugby, Curling	1970	1984-2006	**14** - 36	M	2	0	0	2
2	Clayton Gerein	Athletics	1964	1984-2008	20 - **40**	M	3	1	1	5
3	Arnold Boldt	Athletics; Cycling	1957	1976-1992, 2012	18 - 35	M	7	1	0	8
3	Andre Viger	Athletics	1952	1980-1996	27 - **43**	M	3	3	4	10
3	Chantal Petitclerc	Athletics	1969	1992-2008	22 - 39	F	14	5	2	21
3	Paul Tingley	Sailing	1970	2000-2016	30 - **46**	M	1	0	2	3
3	**Benoît Huot**	Swimming	1984	2000-2016	16 - 32	M	9	5	6	20

=== Winter Paralympics ===
==== Multi-medalists ====
This is a list of Canadian athletes who have won at least two gold medals or three medals at the Winter Paralympics. Athletes in bold are still active.

No.	Athlete	Sport	Years	Games	Gender	Gold	Silver	Bronze	Total
1	**Brian McKeever**	Cross-country skiing	2002-2018	4	M	13	2	2	17
2	Lauren Woolstencroft	Alpine skiing	2002-2010	3	F	8	1	1	10
3	Sonja Gaudet	Wheelchair curling	2006-2014	3	F	3	0	0	3
4	**Mac Marcoux**	Alpine skiing	2014-2018	2	M	2	0	3	5
5	**Ina Forrest**	Wheelchair curling	2010-2018	3	F	2	0	1	3
6	Lana Spreeman	Alpine skiing	1980-1994	5	F	1	6	6	13
7	Viviane Forest	Alpine skiing	2010	1	F	1	3	1	5
8	Stacy Kohut	Alpine skiing	1994-2002	3	F	1	3	0	4
9	**Mark Arendz**	Biathlon	2014-2018	2	M	1	2	2	5
10	**Mollie Jepsen**	Alpine skiing	2018-2022	2	F	2	2	2	6
10	Chris Williamson	Alpine skiing	2002-2014	4	M	1	1	2	4
11	**Natalie Wilkie**	Cross country skiing	2018	1	F	1	1	1	3
12	Karolina Wisniewska	Alpine skiing	1998-2002, 2010	3	F	0	4	4	8

==== Multi golds at one game ====
This is a list of Canadian athletes who have won at least two gold medals at a single Winter Paralympics. Order by gold medals earned, sport then year.

No.	Athlete	Sport	Year	Gender	Gold	Silver	Bronze	Total
1	Lauren Woolstencroft	Alpine skiing	2010	F	5	0	0	5

==== Multi medals at one game ====
This is a list of Canadian athletes who have won at least three medals in a single event at the Winter Paralympics. Order by medals earned, sport then year.

No.	Athlete	Sport	Event	Years	Gender	Gold	Silver	Bronze	Total
1	**Brian McKeever**	Cross-country skiing	10 km cross country	2002-2018	M	5	0	0	5
2	Sonja Gaudet	Wheelchair curling	Mixed curling team	2006-2014	F	3	0	0	3
3	**Ina Forrest**	Wheelchair curling	Mixed curling team	2010-2018	F	2	0	1	3

==== Most appearances ====
This is a list of Canadian athletes who have competed in at least four Winter Paralympics. Still active athletes are in bold.

No.	Athlete	Sport	Born Year	Games Years	First/Last Age	Gender	Gold	Silver	Bronze	Total
1	Chris Daw	Athletics, Rugby, Curling	1970	1984-2006	**14** - 36	M	2	0	0	2
1	Lana Spreeman	Alpine skiing	1955	1980-1994	24 - 38	F	1	6	6	13

== See also ==
- Canadian Paralympic Committee
- Canada at the Olympics
- Canada at the Commonwealth Games
- Canada at the Pan American Games
