= Ed Bordley =

American paralympic wrestler and associate general counsel

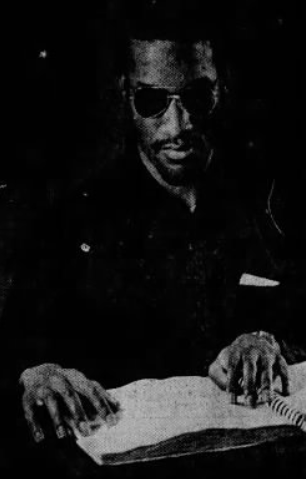
- Bordley in 1976

Personal information
- Born: January 14, 1956 Dover, Delaware, U.S.
- Died: December 16, 2017 (aged 61) Bethesda, Maryland, U.S.
- Education: Harvard University; Harvard Law School
- Occupations: Associate general counsel, U.S. Department of Justice

Sport
- Country: United States
- Sport: Wrestling
Medal record
Representing United States
Paralympic Games
Wrestling
Gold medal – first place	1980 Arnhem	Men's -82 kg

William Edward Bordley (January 14, 1956 – December 16, 2017), also known as Ed Bordley and Eduardo Bordley, was an American paralympic wrestler and associate general counsel. He served as a general attorney for the United States Department of Justice and the FOIA officer for the U.S. Marshals Service. As a wrestler, he won a gold medal at the 1980 Summer Paralympics.

== Life and career ==
Bordley was born in Dover, Delaware. He attended Harvard University on an academic scholarship, studying romance languages. He also attended Harvard Law School, earning his JD degree in 1982.

He began working for the U.S. Department of Justice in 1982, in the Drug Enforcement Administration before taking a position with the U.S. Marshals in 1998. He worked as a FOIA officer. He was regularly contacted by the media for information regarding the names of fugitives caught by the Marshals and charges being levied against them. Media reports stated that he would deny requests stating that to comply was a breach of privacy, which prompted concerns when the Marshals arrested Vermont fugitives on state charges but did not abide by Vermont state law requiring the names of those arrested to be released.

== Sports career ==
In 1974, while attending Caesar Rodney High School, Bordley won the state championship in the 167-pound weight class in the Delaware Interscholastic Wrestling Tournament. He was awarded a Fran Lore Scholarship from the Lower Delaware Gridiron Club on February 3, 1975, and won third overall in Delaware the same year. He continued wrestling while attending Harvard University.

Bordley competed at the 1980 Summer Paralympics, winning the gold medal in the men's -82 kg event. In his later life, he competed in bowling, swimming, and boat racing. In 2006, he was one of nine inductees into the Delaware Afro-American Sports Hall of Fame.

== Death ==
Bordley died on December 16, 2017, at the age of 61, from thymus cancer.
