= Martha Gustafson =

Mexican-Canadian Paralympic swimmer

Personal information
- Full name: Martha Sandoval Gustafson
- Born: January 8, 1950 (age 76) Tampico, Mexico
- Height: 145 cm (4 ft 9 in)
- Weight: 60 kg (132 lb)

Sport
- Country: Mexico (1976–1980); Canada (1984–)
- Disability class: F52
Medal record
Paralympic Games
Table tennis
Silver medal – second place	1976 Toronto	Singles 1C
Swimming
Gold medal – first place	1980 Arnhem	25 m backstroke 1B
Gold medal – first place	1980 Arnhem	25 m freestyle 1B
Gold medal – first place	1984 New York/Stoke Mandeville	25 m Freestyle 1B
Silver medal – second place	1976 Toronto	25 m backstroke 1B
Silver medal – second place	1976 Toronto	25 m breaststroke 1B
Silver medal – second place	1984 New York/Stoke Mandeville	25 m Backstroke 1B
Athletics
Gold medal – first place	1976 Toronto	60 m 1B
Gold medal – first place	1976 Toronto	Club throw 1B
Gold medal – first place	1976 Toronto	Discus throw 1B
Gold medal – first place	1980 Arnhem	Discus throw 1B
Gold medal – first place	1984 New York/Stoke Mandeville	100 m 1A
Gold medal – first place	1984 New York/Stoke Mandeville	200 m 1A
Gold medal – first place	1984 New York/Stoke Mandeville	400 m 1A
Gold medal – first place	1984 New York/Stoke Mandeville	800 m 1A
Gold medal – first place	1984 New York/Stoke Mandeville	Discus throw 1B
Silver medal – second place	1980 Arnhem	60 m 1B
Silver medal – second place	1980 Arnhem	Shot put 1B
Silver medal – second place	1980 Arnhem	Club throw 1B

Martha Sandoval Gustafson (born January 8, 1950) is a Mexican-Canadian Paralympic medallist in table tennis, swimming, and athletics. As a Mexican Paralympian, Gustafson won a total of twelve medals, which includes three golds at the 1976 Summer Paralympics and two golds and the 1980 Summer Paralympics. After she moved to Canada in 1981, Gustafson won six golds and one silver at the 1984 Summer Paralympics for Canada. In 2020, Gustafson became part of the Canadian Disability Hall of Fame.

== Early life and education ==
Gustafson was born in Tampico, Mexico on January 8, 1950. When she was a child, she became sick with polio and required the use of wheelchair. Gustafson played various sports throughout her childhood including curling and shot put. In 1981, she moved from Mexico to Toronto, Canada.

== Career ==
Gustafson played in various sports throughout her career including swimming, table tennis and athletics for both Mexico and Canada. For Mexico, Martha Sandoval competed at the 1976 Summer Paralympics and 1980 Summer Paralympics, winning a combined total of six gold and six silver. Alternatively, Martha Gustafson represented Canada at the 1984 Summer Paralympics, where she won six golds and one silver. For the 1988 Summer Paralympics, Gustafson won no medals in her three athletic events for Canada. Overall, she won one Paralympic medal in table tennis, six in athletics, and twelve in swimming.

Apart from the Paralympics, Gustafson won bronze in shot put at the 2011 IPC Athletics World Championships with a Championship Record of 3.45 metres. She also competed in the discus at that event and placed fourth. That same year, she won gold in shot put at the 2011 Canadian Track and Field Championships. A few years later, Gustafson came in 8th place in discus and 5th place in shot put at the 2013 IPC Athletics World Championships.

In 2016, Gustafson won silver at the 2016 Canadian Track and Field Championships in discus. For her 2019 events, Gustafson was seventh at the discus event during the 2019 World Para Athletics Championships. In the 2019 Parapan American Games, Gustafson won bronze in the discus.

== Honors and personal life ==
Gustafson was a nominee for the Female Athlete With a Disability of the Year award at the 2010 and 2011 Ontario Sports Awards. In 2015, Martha Sandoval Gustafson was nominated for the Female Field Para Athlete award for Athletics Ontario. In 2020, Gustafson was inducted into the Canadian Disability Hall of Fame. That year, she was named the 2021 Bob Secord Award recipient from ParaSport Ontario. Gustafson was married and had one child.
