= Wrestling at the 1980 Summer Paralympics =

Wrestling at the VI Paralympic Games
- Paralympic Wrestling

Wrestling at the 1980 Summer Paralympics consisted of ten events for men.

== Medal summary ==
Event	Gold	Silver	Bronze
Men's -48 kg	W. Gill; United States	None	None
Men's -52 kg	Ken Sparks; United States	None	None
Men's -57 kg	S. Breddlove; Canada	None	None
Men's -62 kg	Rick Futrell; United States	None	None
Men's -68 kg	Gerald O'Neil; United States	None	None
Men's -74 kg	P. Moreton; Canada	None	None
Men's -82 kg	Eduardo Bordley; United States	None	None
Men's -90 kg	S. Klein; United States	Victor M. Pereira; Canada	None
Men's -100 kg	Dave Sime; United States	None	None
Men's +100 kg	James Mastro; United States	None	None
