= Claudia Hengst =

German Paralympic swimmer

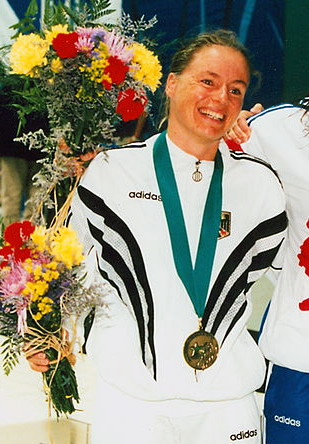

Personal information
- Nationality: German
- Born: September 3, 1969 (age 56) Gräfelfing, West Germany

Sport
- Country: West Germany; Germany
- Sport: Paralympic swimming
Medal record
Paralympic Games
Gold medal – first place	1988 Seoul	100 m Backstroke L6
Gold medal – first place	1988 Seoul	100 m Breaststroke L6
Gold medal – first place	1988 Seoul	100 m Butterfly L6
Gold medal – first place	1988 Seoul	100 m Freestyle L6
Gold medal – first place	1988 Seoul	200 m Individual Medley L6
Gold medal – first place	1988 Seoul	400 m Freestyle L6
Gold medal – first place	1992 Barcelona	100 m Butterfly S10
Gold medal – first place	1992 Barcelona	100 m Freestyle S10
Gold medal – first place	1992 Barcelona	400 m Freestyle S10
Gold medal – first place	1992 Barcelona	4x100 m Medley S7-10
Gold medal – first place	1992 Barcelona	50 m Freestyle S10
Gold medal – first place	1996 Atlanta	100 m Freestyle S10
Gold medal – first place	1996 Atlanta	50 m Freestyle S10
Silver medal – second place	1992 Barcelona	100 m Backstroke S10
Silver medal – second place	1992 Barcelona	200 m Medley SM10
Silver medal – second place	1996 Atlanta	4x100 m Medley S7-10
Silver medal – second place	2004 Athens	400 m Freestyle S10
Bronze medal – third place	1992 Barcelona	4x100 m Freestyle S7-10
Bronze medal – third place	1996 Atlanta	200 m Medley SM10
Bronze medal – third place	1996 Atlanta	400 m Medley SM10
Bronze medal – third place	1996 Atlanta	4x100 m Freestyle S7-10
Bronze medal – third place	2000 Sydney	200 m Medley SM10
Bronze medal – third place	2000 Sydney	400 m Freestyle S10
Bronze medal – third place	2004 Athens	100 m Butterfly S10
Bronze medal – third place	2004 Athens	200 m Individual Medley SM10

Claudia Hengst (born 3 September 1969) is a former German paralympic athlete, who won 25 medals (13 gold) at the Summer Paralympics.

In 2008 were inducted into Paralympic Hall of Fame.

== Biography ==
Her category was L6 and then S10.

== See also ==
- List of multiple Paralympic gold medalists
- List of multiple Paralympic gold medalists at a single Games
