= Uri Bergman =

Israeli paralympic swimming champion

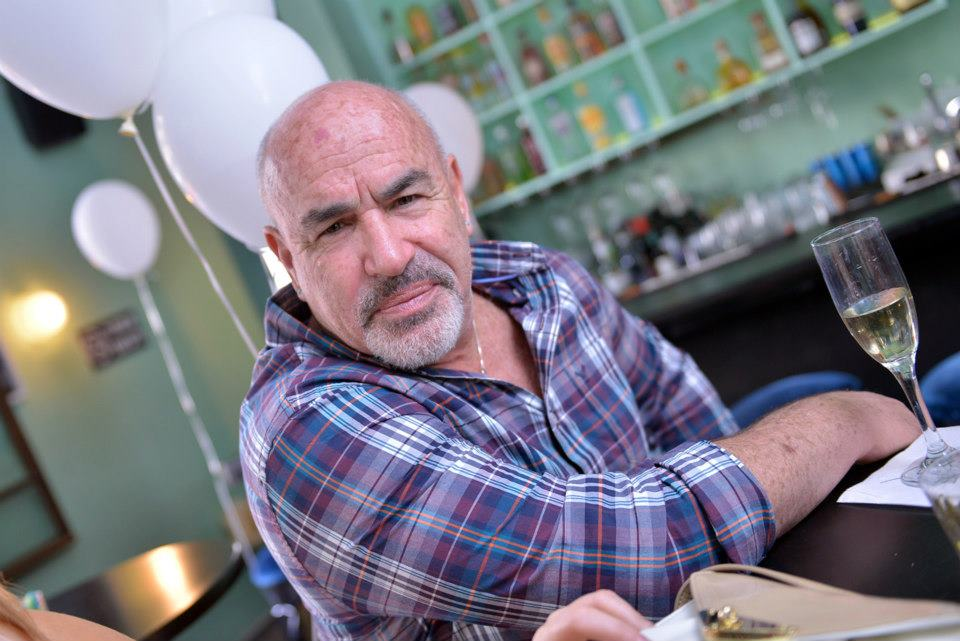
- Bergman in 2014

Personal information
- Native name: אורי ברגמן
- Born: 1953 (age 72–73) Givat Brenner, Israel

Sport
- Sport: Swimming
Medal record
Event / 1st / 2nd / 3rd; Paralympic Games / 12 / 1 / 2
Representing Israel
Paralympic Games
Gold medal – first place	1976 Toronto	100m breaststroke 6
Gold medal – first place	1976 Toronto	100m butterfly 6
Gold medal – first place	1976 Toronto	100m freestyle 6
Gold medal – first place	1976 Toronto	3x50m individual medley
Gold medal – first place	1976 Toronto	4x100m medley relay
Gold medal – first place	1976 Toronto	4x50 freestyle relay
Gold medal – first place	1980 Arnhem	100m butterfly 6
Gold medal – first place	1980 Arnhem	100m freestyle 6
Gold medal – first place	1980 Arnhem	4x50m individual medley
Gold medal – first place	1980 Arnhem	4x50m freestyle relay
Gold medal – first place	1984 New York	100m freestyle 6
Gold medal – first place	1988 Seoul	100m freestyle 6
Silver medal – second place	1984 New York	4X50 relay
Bronze medal – third place	1984 New York	100m butterfly 6
Bronze medal – third place	1988 Seoul	4X100 relay

Uri Bergman (Hebrew: אורי ברגמן; born 1953) is an Israeli paralympic swimming champion. He competed at the 1976, 1980, and 1984, and 1988 Summer Paralympics.

== Life ==
Bergman was born in 1953 in Kibbutz Givat Brenner and contracted polio as a young baby. In his youth he was active in the Kibbutz's water polo team, and later joining the Israel Sports Center for the Disabled. Throughout the years he won 15 medals at the Paralympic Games.

Bergman was certified as a swimming instructor, social worker and as a psychotherapist. He also completed a PhD in psychological rehabilitation and social work. Bergman was hired as coordinator for swimming and hydrotherapy at Wingate College and as a swimming coach at the Sports Center for the Disabled. He also coached Hapoel's water polo team and the Maccabiah's water polo teams in 1993. He was also head coach for Israeli swimmers attending the Paralympic Games, in some of which he was also a referee.

Bergman is active with the Israeli Paralympic Committee. In 2000, he received the John K. Williams, Jr. International Adapted Aquatics Award from the International Swimming Hall of Fame.

== See also ==
- Athletes with most gold medals in one event at the Paralympic Games
