= John Morgan (swimmer) =

American Paralympic swimmer

Sport
- Country: United States
Medal record
Paralympic Games
Swimming
Gold medal – first place	Stoke Mandeville / New York 1984	Men's 100 m Butterfly B2
Gold medal – first place	Stoke Mandeville / New York 1984	Men's 100 m Freestyle B2
Gold medal – first place	Stoke Mandeville / New York 1984	Men's 400 m Freestyle B2
Gold medal – first place	Stoke Mandeville / New York 1984	Men's 200 m Individual Medley B2
Gold medal – first place	Stoke Mandeville / New York 1984	Men's 400 m Individual Medley B2
Gold medal – first place	Barcelona 1992	Men's 100 m Backstroke B1
Gold medal – first place	Barcelona 1992	Men's 200 m Backstroke B1
Gold medal – first place	Barcelona 1992	Men's 100 m Butterfly B1-2
Gold medal – first place	Barcelona 1992	Men's 100 m Freestyle B1
Gold medal – first place	Barcelona 1992	Men's 400 m Freestyle B1
Gold medal – first place	Barcelona 1992	Men's 50 m Freestyle B1
Gold medal – first place	Barcelona 1992	Men's 200 m Medley B1
Gold medal – first place	Barcelona 1992	Men's 400 m Medley B1-2
Silver medal – second place	Barcelona 1992	Men's 100 m Breaststroke B1
Silver medal – second place	Barcelona 1992	Men's 200 m Breaststroke B1

John Morgan is an American swimmer who won 13 gold medals across two Paralympic Games. He made his debut at the 1984 Summer Paralympics where he won five golds, then returned at the 1992 Games in Barcelona where he medalled in all ten events in which he competed. Morgan's success at these Games included setting six world records; throughout his career he set a total of 14 world records. He was inducted into the United States Olympic Hall of Fame in 2008 and the United States Association of Blind Athletes' Hall of Fame in 2011.

== Biography ==
Morgan was born in San Gabriel, California, and was taught to swim in the ocean at Huntington Beach by his parents. He joined the local swim team and worked as a junior lifeguard. The family moved to Argentina, his father's home country, when Morgan was 13. Morgan was finding success as a competitive swimmer and he completed a 20K marathon river swim at the age of 15. While exercising, an accident with a springed exerciser he was holding left Morgan with two detached retinas. Over the next two years his eyesight deteriorated, until in 1980 at age 18 he lost all vision. In 1984, while studying mathematics at University of California, Irvine, he was selected for the All-American Team for open water swimming.

Morgan was competing as a blind swimmer in B1 category events when he attended the International Games for the Disabled, subsequently known as the Paralympic Games, in 1984. He found great success, finishing the tournament with five gold medals. In 1988 he attended the University of California, Berkeley to do his master's degree and consequently missed the Paralympic Games that year. After completing his studies in 1991, he took part in a 35-mile (56 km) open water marathon in Argentina which he completed in 12th position with a time of 8 hours and 24 minutes. Morgan returned for the 1992 Games in Barcelona, again finding success by winning eight golds in backstroke, butterfly, freestyle, and medley events, as well as silver in two breaststroke distances.

Morgan was inducted into the United States Olympic Hall of Fame in 2008 and the United States Association of Blind Athletes' Hall of Fame in 2011.

Aside from swimming, Morgan has pushed himself in other athletic endeavours, including tandem cycling and the successful ascent of Mount Kilimanjaro.
