= Joseph Wengier =

Israeli paralympic champion

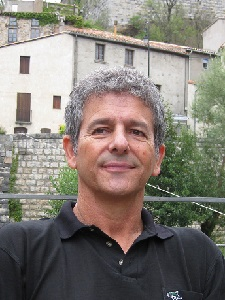

Personal information
- Native name: יוסף ונגר

Sport
- Country: Israel
- Sport: Swimming
- Disability: Polio
Medal record
Event / 1st / 2nd / 3rd; Paralympic Games / 10 / 4 / 5
Representing Israel
Paralympic Games
Swimming
Gold medal – first place	1972 Heidelberg	3X50 medley relay
Gold medal – first place	1976 Toronto	25m backstroke
Gold medal – first place	1976 Toronto	25m breaststroke
Gold medal – first place	1976 Toronto	25m freestyle
Gold medal – first place	1976 Toronto	3X25 individual medley
Gold medal – first place	1976 Toronto	3X50 medley relay
Gold medal – first place	1976 Toronto	4x50 freestyle relay
Gold medal – first place	1980 Arnhem	4X50 freestyle relay
Gold medal – first place	1984 Stoke Mandeville	4X50 freestyle relay
Gold medal – first place	1984 Stoke Mandeville	3X50 medley relay
Silver medal – second place	1980 Arnhem	3X50 relay
Silver medal – second place	1980 Arnhem	50m breaststroke
Silver medal – second place	1984 Stoke Mandeville	50m breaststroke
Silver medal – second place	1984 Stoke Mandeville	4X25 individual medley
Bronze medal – third place	1976 Toronto	25m butterfly
Bronze medal – third place	1984 Stoke Mandeville	50m backstroke
Bronze medal – third place	1984 Stoke Mandeville	50m freestyle
Bronze medal – third place	1988 Seoul	50m breaststroke
Bronze medal – third place	1988 Seoul	4X100 medley relay

Joseph Wengier (Hebrew: יוסף ונגר; born 1954) is an Israeli paralympic swimming champion. He competed at the 1972, 1976, 1980, and 1984, and 1988 Summer Paralympics.

== Life ==
Wengier was born in 1954 and contracted polio when he was one year old. At the age of sixteen he joined the Israel Sports Center for the Disabled.

Throughout his sports career he won 20 medals at the Paralympic Games and set 17 world records.

Wengier works as a translator since 1972 and opened his own company Offiservice in 1988. He has a B.Sc. in biology from Tel Aviv University.

Wengier is a founding member of Etgarim organization for promotion of disabled sports. He was also chairman of the swimming committee within the Israel Sports Association for the Disabled.
