= Mayumi Narita =

Japanese Paralympic swimmer (1970–2025)

Personal information
- Born: August 27, 1970 Kawasaki, Kanagawa, Japan
- Died: September 5, 2025 (aged 55)
- Height: 1.74 m (5 ft 9 in)

Sport
- Sport: Para swimming
- Disability class: S4
Medal record
Women's para swimming
Representing Japan
Paralympic Games
| Gold medal – first place | 1996 Atlanta | 100 m freestyle S4 |
| Gold medal – first place | 1996 Atlanta | 50 m freestyle S4 |
| Gold medal – first place | 2000 Sydney | 50 m backstroke S4 |
| Gold medal – first place | 2000 Sydney | 50 m freestyle S4 |
| Gold medal – first place | 2000 Sydney | 100 m freestyle S4 |
| Gold medal – first place | 2000 Sydney | 150 m individual medley SM4 |
| Gold medal – first place | 2000 Sydney | 200 m freestyle S4 |
| Gold medal – first place | 2000 Sydney | 4×50 m freestyle relay 20 pts |
| Gold medal – first place | 2004 Athens | 50 m freestyle S4 |
| Gold medal – first place | 2004 Athens | 100 m freestyle S4 |
| Gold medal – first place | 2004 Athens | 200 m freestyle S4 |
| Gold medal – first place | 2004 Athens | 50 m breaststroke SB3 |
| Gold medal – first place | 2004 Athens | 50 m backstroke S4 |
| Gold medal – first place | 2004 Athens | 150 m individual medley SM4 |
| Gold medal – first place | 2004 Athens | 4×50 m freestyle relay 20 pts |
| Silver medal – second place | 1996 Atlanta | 200 m Freestyle S4 |
| Silver medal – second place | 1996 Atlanta | 50 m Backstroke S4 |
| Silver medal – second place | 2000 Sydney | 50 m breaststroke SB3 |
| Bronze medal – third place | 1996 Atlanta | 150 m Medley SM4 |
| Bronze medal – third place | 2004 Athens | 4×50 m medley relay 20 pts |
Asian Para Games
| Gold medal – first place | 2018 Jakarta | Mixed 4×50 m freestyle relay - 20 pts |
| Silver medal – second place | 2018 Jakarta | 200 m freestyle - S5 (1–5) |
| Silver medal – second place | 2018 Jakarta | 100 m freestyle - S5 |
| Silver medal – second place | 2018 Jakarta | 50 m freestyle - S5 |

Mayumi Narita (成田 真由美, Narita Mayumi; August 27, 1970 – September 5, 2025) was a Japanese swimmer, described as "one of the world’s best Paralympic athletes" by the International Paralympic Committee. Japan Today has described her as a "swimming sensation perhaps as great as the Thorpedo but whose name few know". She won 15 gold medals at the Paralympics, and 20 total.

== Biography ==
Narita was born on August 27, 1970. She used a wheelchair because of myelitis since the age of 13; in 1994, additionally, she was involved in a traffic accident which left her quadriplegic. In 1996, she represented Japan at the Paralympic Games in Atlanta, where she won two gold medals, two silver and one bronze. At the 2000 Summer Paralympics in Sydney, she won six gold medals. She also set five world records at the Sydney Games.

Narita competed again at the 2004 Summer Paralympics in Athens, and was the Games' most successful athlete, of any nationality and in any sport. She set six world records, seven Paralympic records, and won seven gold medals and one bronze medal.

In 2005, she was given the Best Female Athlete award by the International Paralympic Committee, the Best Male Athlete award going to Brazil's Clodoaldo Silva.

Narita served as vice chair of the Tokyo 2016 Athletes' Commission.

Narita died from bile duct cancer on September 5, 2025, at the age of 55.

== See also ==
- Athletes with most gold medals in one event at the Paralympic Games
