= Magdalena Tjernberg =

Swedish Para Swimmer

- Born: June 3, 1970 (age 55); Gothenburg, Sweden
- Known for: Swimming, Summer Paralympics

Magdalena Tjernberg (born June 3, 1970) in Gothenburg, is a Swedish former Paralympic swimmer. Her twin sister, Gabriella Tjernberg, was also a paraswimming athlete.

She won four gold and one silver medal in the Summer Paralympics which was held in New York in 1984. In the next Summer Paralympics which was held in Seoul in 1988, she took six gold and two silver medals.

At the European Championships in Rome in 1985, she took five golds. At the 1986 World Cup in Gothenburg, Tjernberg took nine gold, one silver and two bronze. She was named Sports Woman of the Year in 1986.

In 1988, she finished second in the voting for the Jerring Award; second behind the Olympic gold medalist in skating, Tomas Gustafson.

== International honors ==
Paralympic Games
Year	Place	Medal	Proof
1984	New York (United States); Stoke Mandeville (United Kingdom)	Gold	100 m butterfly B1
1984	New York (United States); Stoke Mandeville (United Kingdom)	Gold	100 m breaststroke B1
1984	New York (United States); Stoke Mandeville (United Kingdom)	Gold	400 m breaststroke B1
1984	New York (United States); Stoke Mandeville (United Kingdom)	Gold	400 m free B1
1984	New York (United States); Stoke Mandeville (United Kingdom)	Silver	100m free B1
1988	Seoul (South Korea)	Gold	50 m breaststroke B1
1988	Seoul (South Korea)	Gold	100 m breaststroke B1
1988	Seoul (South Korea)	Gold	200 m breaststroke B1
1988	Seoul (South Korea)	Gold	100m free B1
1988	Seoul (South Korea)	Gold	400 m free B1
1988	Seoul (South Korea)	Gold	200m B1 styles
1988	Seoul (South Korea)	Silver	50 m free B1
1988	Seoul (South Korea)	Silver	100 m butterfly B1
