= Michael Edgson =

Canadian Paralympic swimmer

Personal information
- Nationality: Canadian
- Born: 6 May 1969 (age 57) North Vancouver, British Columbia, Canada

Sport
- Country: Canada
- Sport: Swimming
- Disability class: B3
- Coached by: Mike Blondal; Peter Vizsolyi; Ron Jacks
Medal record
Men's swimming
Representing Canada
Paralympics
Gold medal – first place	1984 Stoke Mandeville / New York	100m butterfly
Gold medal – first place	1984 Stoke Mandeville / New York	200m individual medley
Gold medal – first place	1984 Stoke Mandeville / New York	400m individual medley
Gold medal – first place	1984 Stoke Mandeville / New York	4×100m medley relay
Gold medal – first place	1988 Seoul	50m freestyle
Gold medal – first place	1988 Seoul	100m freestyle
Gold medal – first place	1988 Seoul	400m freestyle
Gold medal – first place	1988 Seoul	100m backstroke
Gold medal – first place	1988 Seoul	100m butterfly
Gold medal – first place	1988 Seoul	200m individual medley
Gold medal – first place	1988 Seoul	400m individual medley
Gold medal – first place	1988 Seoul	4×100m freestyle relay
Gold medal – first place	1988 Seoul	4×100m medley relay
Gold medal – first place	1992 Barcelona	100m backstroke
Gold medal – first place	1992 Barcelona	100m butterfly
Gold medal – first place	1992 Barcelona	200m individual medley
Gold medal – first place	1992 Barcelona	400m individual medley
Silver medal – second place	1984 Stoke Mandeville / New York	100m backstroke
Silver medal – second place	1984 Stoke Mandeville / New York	4×100m freestyle relay
Silver medal – second place	1992 Barcelona	200m backstroke

Michael Edgson (born 6 May 1969) is a Canadian retired Paralympic swimmer. He is amongst the most successful Paralympians of all time having won 17 gold medals. He attended three Games between 1984 and 1992, winning medals in all but one of the events in which he competed individually. As a visually-impaired athlete Edgson competes in the B3 classification.

== Early life ==
Born in North Vancouver on 6 May 1969, Edgson moved to Nanaimo at a young age. He played ice hockey, soccer, and gymnastics but found that his visual impairment did not negatively affect him in swimming as it might in other sports and began swimming competitively at the age of eleven.

== Swimming ==
He has competed internationally in both disability and able-bodied swimming events from age 14.

Edgson set nine world records during a career that lasted twelve years. With 18 Paralympic gold medals Edgson is one of the most successful Canadian athletes of all time. He is a three-time recipient of the BC Disabled Athlete of the Year Award and was inducted into the Terry Fox Hall of Fame in 2006. In 2009 Edgson became the first Paralympian to be honoured with a place in Swimming Canada's Circle of Excellence. In 2013, he was inducted in to the Greater Victoria Sports Hall of Fame and in 2015 he was awarded the Order of Sport, marking his induction into Canada's Sports Hall of Fame.

At the 1984 Summer Paralympics in Long Island Edgson won five medals (four gold and one silver) and set four new records. His most successful haul came four years later in Gothenburg when he won nine events. He was chosen to carry the Canadian flag at the closing ceremony. Edgson went on to win four more gold medals and a silver in 1992 in Barcelona.

After retiring from international competition Edgson became the finance director for the Canadian Paralympic Committee.
