= Trischa Zorn =

American Paralympic swimmer (born 1964)

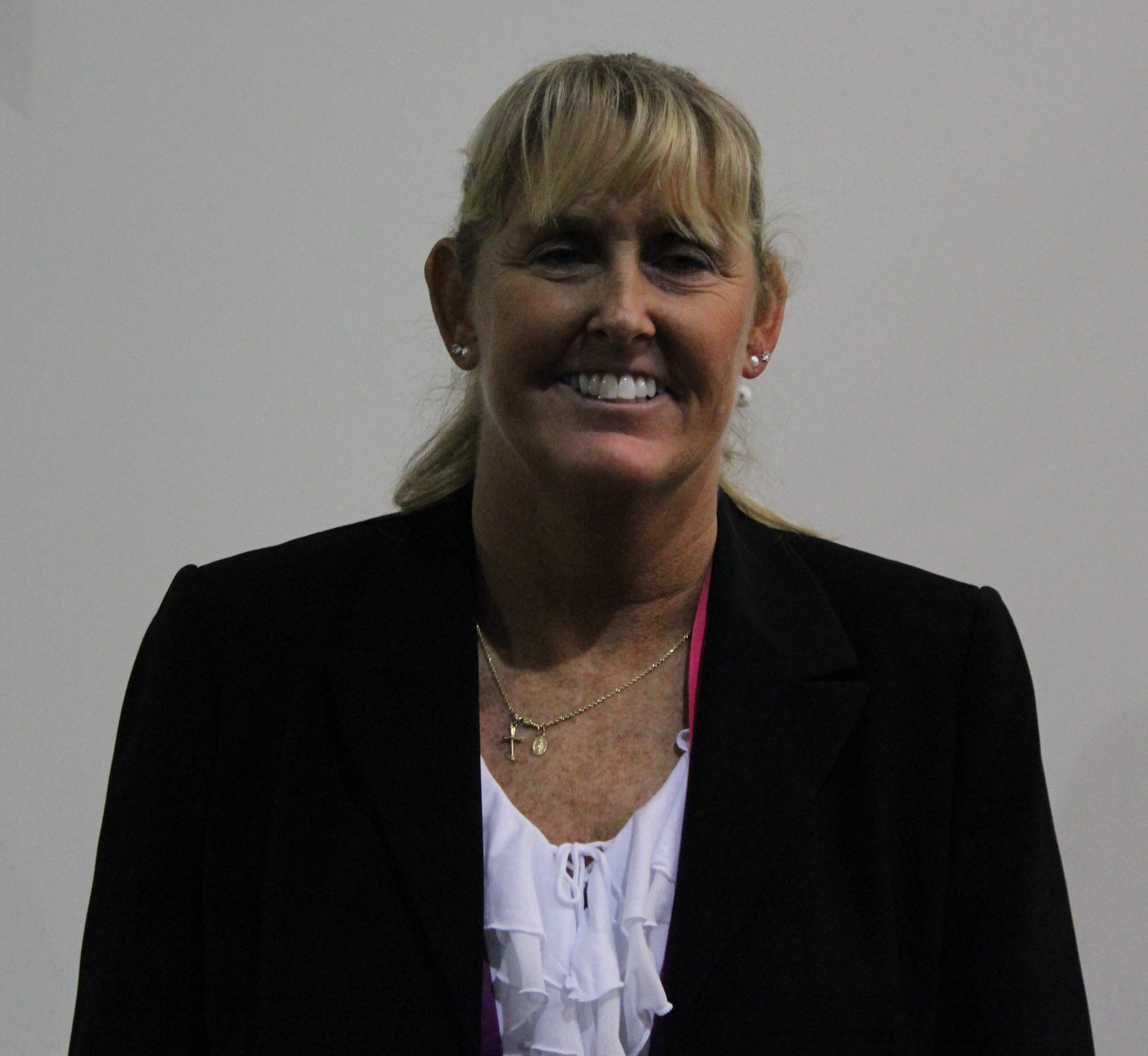
- Zorn at the 2012 Summer Paralympics

Personal information
- Born: June 1, 1964 (age 62) Orange, California, U.S.

Sport
- Disability class: S12, SB12, SM12
Medal record
Women's para swimming
Representing United States
Paralympic Games
Gold medal – first place	1980 Arnhem	100m backstroke B
Gold medal – first place	1980 Arnhem	100m butterfly B
Gold medal – first place	1980 Arnhem	100m freestyle B
Gold medal – first place	1980 Arnhem	200m individual medley B
Gold medal – first place	1980 Arnhem	400m individual medley B
Gold medal – first place	1980 Arnhem	4x100m freestyle relay A-B
Gold medal – first place	1980 Arnhem	4x100m medley relay A-B
Gold medal – first place	1984 New York	100m backstroke B2
Gold medal – first place	1984 New York	100m butterfly B2
Gold medal – first place	1984 New York	100m freestyle B2
Gold medal – first place	1984 New York	200m individual medley B2
Gold medal – first place	1984 New York	400m individual medley B2
Gold medal – first place	1984 New York	4x100m medley relay B1-B3
Gold medal – first place	1988 Seoul	50m breaststroke B2
Gold medal – first place	1988 Seoul	50m freestyle B2
Gold medal – first place	1988 Seoul	100m backstroke B2
Gold medal – first place	1988 Seoul	100m breaststroke B2
Gold medal – first place	1988 Seoul	100m butterfly B2
Gold medal – first place	1988 Seoul	100m freestyle B2
Gold medal – first place	1988 Seoul	200m breaststroke B2
Gold medal – first place	1988 Seoul	200m individual medley B2
Gold medal – first place	1988 Seoul	400m freestyle B2
Gold medal – first place	1988 Seoul	400m individual medley B2
Gold medal – first place	1988 Seoul	4x100m freestyle relay B1-B3
Gold medal – first place	1988 Seoul	4x100m medley relay B1-B3
Gold medal – first place	1992 Barcelona	50m freestyle B2
Gold medal – first place	1992 Barcelona	100m backstroke B2
Gold medal – first place	1992 Barcelona	100m breaststroke B1-B2
Gold medal – first place	1992 Barcelona	100m freestyle B2
Gold medal – first place	1992 Barcelona	200m backstroke B1-B2
Gold medal – first place	1992 Barcelona	200m breaststroke B1-B3
Gold medal – first place	1992 Barcelona	200m individual medley B2
Gold medal – first place	1992 Barcelona	400m individual medley B1-B3
Gold medal – first place	1992 Barcelona	4x100m freestyle relay B1-B3
Gold medal – first place	1992 Barcelona	4x100m medley relay B1-B3
Gold medal – first place	1996 Atlanta	100m backstroke B2
Gold medal – first place	1996 Atlanta	200m individual medley B2
Silver medal – second place	1984 New York	4x100m freestyle relay B1-B3
Silver medal – second place	1992 Barcelona	100m butterfly B2-B3
Silver medal – second place	1992 Barcelona	400m freestyle B2-B3
Silver medal – second place	1996 Atlanta	50m freestyle B2
Silver medal – second place	1996 Atlanta	400m freestyle B2
Silver medal – second place	1996 Atlanta	4×100m medley relay B1-B3
Silver medal – second place	2000 Sydney	100 m backstroke
Silver medal – second place	2000 Sydney	100 m breaststroke
Silver medal – second place	2000 Sydney	100 m butterfly
Silver medal – second place	2000 Sydney	200 m individual medley
Bronze medal – third place	1996 Atlanta	100 m breaststroke
Bronze medal – third place	1996 Atlanta	100 m freestyle
Bronze medal – third place	1996 Atlanta	4 × 100 m freestyle
Bronze medal – third place	2000 Sydney	50 m breaststroke
Bronze medal – third place	2004 Athens	100 m backstroke

Trischa Zorn (born June 1, 1964) is an American Paralympic swimmer. Blind from birth, she competed in Paralympic swimming (S12, SB12, and SM12 disability categories). She is the most successful athlete in the history of the Paralympic Games, having won 55 medals (41 gold, 9 silver, and 5 bronze), and was inducted into the Paralympic Hall of Fame in 2012. She took the Paralympic Oath for athletes at the 1996 Summer Paralympics in Atlanta.

== Biography ==
Zorn studied special education at the University of Nebraska–Lincoln and school administration and supervision at Indiana University-Purdue University Indianapolis and law at the IU Robert H. McKinney School of Law.

She competed in the 1980, 1984, 1988, 1992, 1996, 2000 and 2004 Paralympic Games and won a combined total of 55 medals (41 gold, 9 silver, 5 bronze). In the 1996 Games in Atlanta, she won more medals than any other athlete: two gold, three silver and three bronze. She had also topped the individual medal table at the 1992 Paralympic Games in Barcelona, with ten gold medals and two silver. She had won seven gold medals during her first Games in 1980.

After the Sydney Games in 2000, she also held eight world records in her disability category (50 m backstroke, 100 m backstroke, 200 m backstroke, 200 m individual medley, 400 m individual medley, 200 m breaststroke, 4×50 m medley relay, 4×50 m free relay).

On 1 January 2005, Zorn was one of eight athletes honored during New Year celebrations in Times Square in New York City. The other seven were Ian Thorpe of Australia, Nadia Comăneci of Romania, George Weah of Liberia, Françoise Mbango Etone of Cameroon, Gao Min of China, Félix Sánchez of the Dominican Republic and Bart Conner of the United States. The eight athletes were "centre stage during the festivities in the countdown leading up to ringing in the New Year". In 2012, she was inducted into the International Paralympian Hall of Fame.

Although no longer competing as a swimmer, Zorn works as a legal professional for the Department of Veterans Affairs and lives near Indianapolis, Indiana.

== Paralympic medals ==
The medals without relay races from 1980 Summer Paralympics to 1988 Summer Paralympics, are 46 (32, 9, 5) for IPC. The relay team of United States, in the category of Zorn, won 5 gold and 1 silver in these three Paralympics. The question marks in the infobox refer however to 9 gold medals (not 5 gold and 1 silver medal), this is to confirm the total number of 55 (of which 41 gold), reported in many websites including that of the official IPC in another of his article.

Paralympics	Individual			Team			Total		
Paralympics	Gold medal	Silver medal	Bronze medal	Gold medal	Silver medal	Bronze medal	Gold medal	Silver medal	Bronze medal
1980 Arnhem	5	0	0	2	0	0	7	0	0
1984 New York	5	0	0	1	1	0	6	1	0
1988 Seoul	10	0	0	2	0	0	12	0	0
1992 Barcelona	8	2	0	2	0	0	10	2	0
1996 Atlanta	2	2	2	0	1	1	2	3	3
2000 Sydney	0	4	1	0	0	0	0	4	1
2004 Athens	0	0	1	0	0	0	0	0	1
Total	30	8	4	7	2	1	37	10	5

== See also ==
- Athletes with most gold medals in one sport at the Paralympic Games
- Wikinews interviews winner of 55 Paralympic medals, Trischa Zorn
