= Elizabeth Scott (swimmer) =

American Paralympic swimmer

Personal information
- Nickname: Beth Scott

Sport
- Country: United States
- Sport: Paralympic swimming
- Disability class: B3
- Retired: 2000
Medal record
Paralympic swimming
Representing United States
Paralympic Games
Gold medal – first place	1992 Barcelona	50m freestyle B3
Gold medal – first place	1992 Barcelona	100m freestyle B3
Gold medal – first place	1992 Barcelona	400m freestyle B2-3
Gold medal – first place	1992 Barcelona	100m backstroke B3
Gold medal – first place	1992 Barcelona	100m butterfly B2-3
Gold medal – first place	1992 Barcelona	4x100m freestyle relay B1-3
Gold medal – first place	1992 Barcelona	4x100m medley relay B1-3
Gold medal – first place	1996 Atlanta	100m butterfly B3
Gold medal – first place	2000 Sydney	50m freestyle S13
Gold medal – first place	2000 Sydney	100m freestyle S13
Silver medal – second place	1996 Atlanta	4x100m medley relay B1-3
Silver medal – second place	2000 Sydney	200m individual medley SM13
Bronze medal – third place	1996 Atlanta	100m backstroke B3
Bronze medal – third place	1996 Atlanta	100m breaststroke B3
Bronze medal – third place	1996 Atlanta	200m individual medley B3
Bronze medal – third place	1996 Atlanta	4x100m freestyle relay B1-3
Bronze medal – third place	2000 Sydney	100m breaststroke SB13

Elizabeth Scott is a United States Paralympian. She learned how to swim at age 5, and in college was elected as captain of her college swim team (Ball State University), where she also set school records and won a conference title. She earned a place on the Dean’s list while studying Sport Administration and Adapted Physical Education.

Scott earned 17 Paralympic medals (10 gold, 2 silver and 5 bronze) in three Paralympic Games between 1992 and 2000 (Barcelona, Atlanta and Sydney). seven world records

In 1993 and 1996, she was named as the USOC Blind Athlete of the Year. In 2018 Scott was inducted into the US Association of Blind Athletes Hall of Fame.
