= Cross-country skiing at the 1998 Winter Paralympics =

Cross-country skiing at the VII Paralympic Winter Games

Cross-country skiing at the 1998 Winter Paralympics consisted of 39 events, 24 for men and 15 for women.

For the first and only time the classification Intellectual disability (ID) was included in cross-country skiing events at the Paralympic Games.

== Medal table ==
Rank	Nation	Gold medal	Silver medal	Bronze medal	Total
1	Russia (RUS)	11	8	7	26
2	Norway (NOR)	9	5	7	21
3	Finland (FIN)	7	5	5	17
4	Germany (GER)	3	10	5	18
5	France (FRA)	3	1	3	7
5	Ukraine (UKR)	3	1	3	7
7	Austria (AUT)	1	2	1	4
8	Switzerland (SUI)	1	1	3	5
9	Denmark (DEN)	1	0	0	1
10	Canada (CAN)	0	2	0	2
10	Italy (ITA)	0	2	0	2
12	Japan (JPN)	0	1	1	2
13	Netherlands (NED)	0	1	0	1
14	Poland (POL)	0	0	2	2
14	United States (USA)	0	0	2	2
16	Sweden (SWE)	0	0	1	1
Total		39	39	40	118

== Medal summary ==
The competition events were:

- 2.5 km: - women
- 5 km: men - women
- 10 km: men - women
- 15 km: men
- 20 km: men
- 3x2.5 km relay: men - women
- 4x5 km relay: men

Each event had separate standing, sitting, or visually impaired classifications:

- LW2 - standing: single leg amputation above the knee
- LW3 - standing: double leg amputation below the knee, mild cerebral palsy, or equivalent impairment
- LW4 - standing: single leg amputation below the knee
- LW5/7 - standing: double arm amputation
- LW6/8 - standing: single arm amputation
- LW9 - standing: amputation or equivalent impairment of one arm and one leg
- LW 10 - sitting: paraplegia with no or some upper abdominal function and no functional sitting balance
- LW 11 - sitting: paraplegia with fair functional sitting balance
- LW 12 - sitting: double leg amputation above the knees, or paraplegia with some leg function and good sitting balance
- B1 - visually impaired: no functional vision
- B2 - visually impaired: up to ca 3-5% functional vision
- B3 - visually impaired: under 10% functional vision
- ID - intellectual disability

=== Men's events ===
Event	Class	Gold	Silver	Bronze
5 km classical technique	B1	Valeri Kouptchinski guide: Viatcheslav Doubov; Russia	Magne Lunde guide: Roar Lunde; Norway	Helge Flo guide: Paal Sneve; Norway
5 km classical technique	B2	Frank Hoefle guide: Ulrich Zipfel; Germany	Irek Mannanov guide: Salavat Goumerov; Russia	Torbjoern Ek guide: Christer Wennergrund; Sweden
5 km classical technique	B3	Alexandre Nassarouline guide: Alexei Kopytine; Russia	Alexander Schwarz guide: Ralf Rombach; Germany	Grigori Klimov guide: Nikolai Kireitcmev; Russia
5 km classical technique	ID	Pedro Kardash; Ukraine	Satoru Abiko; Japan	Iuri Isaev; Russia
5 km classical technique	LW3/4/9	Andre Favre; France	Kjartan Haugen; Norway	Kalervo Pieksaemaeki; Finland
5 km classical technique	LW5/7,6/8	Sten Oluf Horn; Norway	Thomas Oelsner; Germany	Axel Hecker; Germany
5 km sitski	LW10	Sergej Shilov; Russia	Alexander Brunet; France	Klaus Kleiser; Germany
5 km sitski	LW11	Ruedi Weber; Switzerland	Oliver Anthofer; Austria	Karl Einar Henriksen; Norway
5 km sitski	LW12	Kari Joki-Erkkila; Finland	Michael Weymann; Germany	Teuvo Ojala; Finland
10 km sitski	LW10	Alexander Brunet; France	Mikhail Terentiev; Russia	Heinz Frei; Switzerland
10 km sitski	LW11	Karl Einar Henriksen; Norway	Roland Ruepp; Italy	Ruedi Weber; Switzerland
10 km sitski	LW12	Kari Joki-Erkkila; Finland	Michael Weymann; Germany	Robert Balk; United States
10 km sitski	LW12	Kari Joki-Erkkila; Finland	Michael Weymann; Germany	Teuvo Ojala; Finland
15 km free technique	B1	Valeri Kouptchinski guide: Russia	Wilhelm Brem guide: Germany	Oleh Munts guide: Russia
15 km free technique	B2	Irek Mannanov guide: Russia	Frank Hoefle guide: Germany	Nikolai Ilioutchenko guide: Russia
15 km free technique	B3	Alexandre Nassarouline guide: Russia	Alexander Schwarz guide: Germany	Elie Zampin guide: France
15 km free technique	ID	Pedro Kardash; Ukraine	Iuri Isaev; Russia	Louri Semiannikov; Russia
15 km free technique	LW2/3/4/9	Andre Favre; France	Kalervo Pieksaemaeki; Finland	Wolfgang Mahler; Germany
15 km free technique	LW5/7,6/8	Thomas Oelsner; Germany	Andreas Hustveit; Norway	Emmanuel Lacroix; France
15 km sitski	LW10-12	Karl Einar Henriksen; Norway	Mikhail Terentiev; Russia	Heinz Frei; Switzerland
20 km classical technique	B1-3	Valeri Kouptchinski guide: Viatcheslav Doubov; Russia	Irek Mannanov guide: Salavat Goumerov; Russia	Frank Hoefle guide: Ulrich Zipfel; Germany
20 km classical technique	ID	Pedro Kardash; Ukraine	Iuri Isaev; Russia	Hiroki Shinohara; Japan
20 km classical technique	LW2-9	Sten Oluf Horn; Norway	Kalervo Pieksaemaeki; Finland	Michael Crenshaw; United States
3×2.5 km relay	LW10-12	Germany (GER); Klaus Kleiser; Michael Weymann; Bruno Zimmermann	Switzerland (SUI); Franco Belletti; Ruedi Weber; Walter Widmer	France (FRA); Omar Bouyoucef; Alexander Brunet; Didier Riedlinger
4×5 km relay	standing/ blind	Russia (RUS); Valeri Kouptchinski; Irek Mannanov; Oleh Munts; Alexandre Nassarouline	Germany (GER); Wilhelm Brem; Frank Hoefle; Wolfgang Mahler; Thomas Oelsner	Norway (NOR); Kjartan Haugen; Sten Oluf Horn; Andreas Hustveit; Magne Lunde

=== Women's events ===
Event	Class	Gold	Silver	Bronze
2.5 km sitski	LW10-12	Ragnhild Myklebust; Norway	Colette Bourgonje; Canada	Svitlana Tryfonova; Ukraine
5 km classical technique	B1	Elisabeth Maxwald guide: Florian Stoger; Austria	Verena Bentele guide: Ralph Schmidt; Germany	Lioubov Paninykh guide: Alexander Pridtchin; Russia
5 km classical technique	B2-3	Kaija Tuikkanen guide: Hannu Aaltonen; Finland	Sisko Kiiski guide: Tuomas Toerroenen; Finland	Jaana Argillander guide: Arto Kaukonen; Finland
5 km classical technique	ID	Natalia Smirnova; Russia	Olga Kravchuk; Ukraine	Natalia Lugakova; Russia
5 km classical technique	LW2-9	Tanja Kari; Finland	Anne Helene Barlund; Norway	Siw Vestengen; Norway
5 km free technique	B1	Anne-Mette Bredahl guide: Denmark	Verena Bentele guide: Germany	Elisabeth Maxwald guide: Austria
5 km free technique	B2-3	Tone Gravvold guide: Norway	Kaija Tuikkanen guide: Finland	Sisko Kiiski guide: Finland
5 km free technique	ID	Natalia Smirnova; Russia	Natalia Lugakova; Russia	Danuta Poznanska; Poland
5 km free technique	LW2-9	Tanja Kari; Finland	Marjorie van de Bunt; Netherlands	Anne Helene Barlund; Norway
5 km sitski	LW10-12	Ragnhild Myklebust; Norway	Colette Bourgonje; Canada	Olena Akopyan; Ukraine
10 km sitski	LW10-12	Ragnhild Myklebust; Norway	Dorothea Agetle; Italy	Tamara Kulynych; Ukraine
15 km classical technique	B1-3	Sisko Kiiski guide: Tuomas Toerroenen; Finland	Kaija Tuikkanen guide: Hannu Aaltonen; Finland	Tone Gravvold guide: Frode Nilssen; Norway
15 km classical technique	ID	Natalia Smirnova; Russia	Natalia Lugakova; Russia	Danuta Poznanska; Poland
15 km classical technique	LW2-9	Tanja Kari; Finland	Anne Helene Barlund; Norway	Siw Vestengen; Norway
3×2.5 km relay	open	Norway (NOR); Anne Helene Barlund; Tone Gravvold; Ragnhild Myklebust	Austria (AUT); Gabriele Berghofer; Renata Hoenisch; Elisabeth Maxwald	Germany (GER); Verena Bentele; Susanne Ischinger; Susanne Wohlmacher

== See also ==
- Cross-country skiing at the 1998 Winter Olympics
