= Biathlon at the 1998 Winter Paralympics =

Biathlon at the VII Paralympic Winter Games

Biathlon at the 1998 Winter Paralympics consisted of twelve events, eight for men and four for women.

== Medal table ==
Rank	Nation	Gold medal	Silver medal	Bronze medal	Total
1	Germany (GER)	6	2	2	10
2	France (FRA)	2	2	1	5
3	Switzerland (SUI)	2	0	1	3
4	Japan (JPN)	1	1	0	2
5	Norway (NOR)	1	0	1	2
6	Russia (RUS)	0	2	2	4
7	Austria (AUT)	0	2	0	2
8	Ukraine (UKR)	0	1	1	2
9	Slovakia (SVK)	0	1	0	1
9	Sweden (SWE)	0	1	0	1
11	Finland (FIN)	0	0	2	2
12	Denmark (DEN)	0	0	1	1
12	Netherlands (NED)	0	0	1	1
Total		12	12	12	36

== Medal summary ==
The competition event was:

- 7.5 km: men - women

The event had separate standing, sitting, or visually impaired classifications:

- LW2 - standing: single leg amputation above the knee
- LW3 - standing: double leg amputation below the knee, mild cerebral palsy, or equivalent impairment
- LW4 - standing: single leg amputation below the knee
- LW5/7 - standing: double arm amputation
- LW6/8 - standing: single arm amputation
- LW9 - standing: amputation or equivalent impairment of one arm and one leg
- LW 10 - sitting: paraplegia with no or some upper abdominal function and no functional sitting balance
- LW 11 - sitting: paraplegia with fair functional sitting balance
- LW 12 - sitting: double leg amputation above the knees, or paraplegia with some leg function and good sitting balance
- B1 - visually impaired: no functional vision
- B2 - visually impaired: up to ca 3-5% functional vision
- B3 - visually impaired: under 10% functional vision

=== Men's events ===
Event	Class	Gold	Silver	Bronze
7.5 km free technique	B1	Wilhelm Brem; Germany	Oleh Munts; Russia	Udo Hirsch; Germany
7.5 km free technique	B2	Frank Hoefle; Germany	Torbjoern Ek; Sweden	Adrian Mosimann; Switzerland
7.5 km free technique	B3	Alexander Schwarz; Germany	Miroslav Jambor; Slovakia	Alexandre Nassarouline; Russia
7.5 km free technique	LW2,3,4,5/7,9	Andre Favre; France	Axel Hecker; Germany	Kalervo Pieksaemaeki; Finland
7.5 km free technique	LW6/8	Thomas Oelsner; Germany	Emmanuel Lacroix; France	Andreas Hustveit; Norway
7.5 km sitski	LW10	Alexander Brunet; France	Eiji Nozawa; Japan	Mikhail Terentiev; Russia
7.5 km sitski	LW11	Walter Widmer; Switzerland	Oliver Anthofer; Austria	Didier Riedlinger; France
7.5 km sitski	LW12	Michael Weymann; Germany	Bruno Zimmermann; Germany	Teuvo Ojala; Finland

=== Women's events ===
Event	Class	Gold	Silver	Bronze
7.5 km free technique	B1	Verena Bentele; Germany	Irina Selivanova; Russia	Anne-Mette Bredahl; Denmark
7.5 km free technique	B2-3	Miyuki Kobayashi; Japan	Gabriele Berghofer; Austria	Susanne Wohlmacher; Germany
7.5 km free technique	LW2-4,6/8,9	Theres Huser; Switzerland	Anne Floriet; France	Marjorie van de Bunt; Netherlands
7.5 km sitski	LW10-12	Ragnhild Myklebust; Norway	Tamara Kulynych; Ukraine	Olena Akopyan; Ukraine

== See also ==
- Biathlon at the 1998 Winter Olympics
