= Elisabeth Maxwald =

Austrian Paralympic skier (1967–2013)

Personal information
- Born: 21 June 1967
- Died: 9 July 2013 (aged 46)

Sport
- Country: Austria
- Sport: Alpine skiing Cross-country skiing
- Disability class: B1
Medal record
Representing Austria
Paralympic Games
Alpine skiing
Gold medal – first place	1988 Innsbruck	Giant slalom B1
Cross-country skiing
Gold medal – first place	1998 Nagano	5km classical B1
Silver medal – second place	1998 Nagano	3x2.5km relay open
Bronze medal – third place	1998 Nagano	5km free B1

Elisabeth Maxwald (21 June 1967 - 9 July 2013) was an Austrian Paralympic skier. She represented Austria in Paralympic Alpine skiing at the 1988 Paralympic Winter Games in Innsbruck and 1998 Paralympic Winter Games in Nordic skiing in Nagano. She won four medals, two gold, a silver and a bronze.

== Career ==
She competed at the 1988 Winter Paralympic Games, winning a gold medal in the giant slalom in 4:18.47 (second Cara Dunne who finished the race in 4:59.62 and third Susana Herrera in 5: 30.41). She was disqualified in Women's downhill B1.

She competed at the 1998 Winter Paralympic Games in Nagano. She won gold in Nordic skiing, the 5 km classic technique race, ahead of the German athlete Verena Bentele and the Russian Lioubov Paninykh; she won silver in the 3x2.5 km bracket (together with Gabriele Berghofer and Renata Hoenisch); and she won bronze in the 5 km freestyle race.
