= Miyuki Kobayashi (biathlete) =

Japanese paralympian

Personal information
- Born: 19 November 1973 (age 52)

Sport
- Country: Japan
- Sport: Cross-country skiing Biathlon
- Disability class: B2
Medal record
Biathlon
Representing Japan
Paralympic Games
Gold medal – first place	1998 Nagano	7.5km B2-3
Gold medal – first place	2006 Torino	12.5km blind
Silver medal – second place	2006 Torino	7.5km blind

Miyuki Kobayashi (born 19 November 1973) is a Japanese paralympic cross-country skier and biathlete.

== Career ==
At the 2007 IPC World Cup, she won a gold medal in B1-B3 Biathlon Ladies.

At the 2006 Winter Paralympics, she won a gold medal in biathlon 12.5 km visually impaired, and silver medal in biathlon 7.5 km visually impaired.
