= Alpine skiing at the 1988 Winter Paralympics – Women's downhill B1 =

Women's downhill B1 at the IV Paralympic Winter Games
- Paralympic Alpine Skiing
- Venue: Innsbruck
- Dates: January 1988
- Competitors: 6 from 4 nations

Medalists
1st place, gold medalist(s)		Susana Herrera	Spain
2nd place, silver medalist(s)		Cara Dunne	United States
3rd place, bronze medalist(s)		Carmela Cantisani	Italy

The women's downhill B1 was one of the events held in Alpine skiing at the 1988 Winter Paralympics in Innsbruck.

There were 6 competitors in the final.

Spain's Susana Herrera set a time of 1:42.41, taking the gold medal. Since only three skiers finished the race, all three won a medal.

== Results ==
=== Final ===
Rank	Athlete	Time
1st place, gold medalist(s)	Susana Herrera (ESP)	1:42.41
2nd place, silver medalist(s)	Cara Dunne (USA)	1:40.08
3rd place, bronze medalist(s)	Carmela Cantisani (ITA)	1:57.82
	Nancy Stevens (USA)	DNS
	Sheila Holzworth (USA)	DNS
	Elisabeth Maxwald (AUT)	DSQ
