= Japan at the 1992 Winter Paralympics =

- IPC code: JPN
- NPC: Japan Paralympic Committee
- Website: www.jsad.or.jp (in Japanese)

in Tignes-Albertville
- Competitors: 15
- Medals Ranked 19th: Gold 0 Silver 0 Bronze 2 Total 2

Winter Paralympics appearances (overview)
- 1976; 1980; 1984; 1988; 1992; 1994; 1998; 2002; 2006; 2010; 2014; 2018; 2022; 2026

Japan competed at the 1992 Winter Paralympics in Tignes/Albertville, France. 15 competitors from Japan won 2 medals, both bronze, and finished 19th in the medal table.

== See also ==
- Japan at the Paralympics
- Japan at the 1992 Winter Olympics
