= Thomas Oelsner =

German paralympic skier

Personal information
- Born: 19 June 1970 (age 56)

Sport
- Country: Germany
- Sport: Paralympic Nordic skiing
- Club: WSV Oberhof
Medal record
Paralympic Games
Gold medal – first place	1994 Lillehammer	Men's Biathlon 7.5 km Free Technique LW5-8
Gold medal – first place	1994 Lillehammer	Men's Cross Country 10 km Free Technique LW6/8
Gold medal – first place	1994 Lillehammer	Men's Cross Country 20 km Classical Technique LW6/8
Gold medal – first place	1998 Nagano	Men's Biathlon 7.5 km Free Technique LW6/8
Gold medal – first place	1998 Nagano	Men's Cross Country 15 km Free Technique LW5/7,6/8
Silver medal – second place	1994 Lillehammer	Men's Cross Country 5 km Classical Technique LW6/8
Silver medal – second place	1994 Lillehammer	Men's 4x5 km Cross Country Relay standing/blind
Silver medal – second place	1998 Nagano	Men's Cross Country 5 km Classical Technique LW5/7,6/8
Silver medal – second place	1998 Nagano	Men's Cross Country 4x5 km Relay standing/blind
Bronze medal – third place	2006 Turin	Men's Cross Country 5 km standing
Disqualified	2002 Salt Lake City	Men's Cross Country 5 km standing

Thomas Oelsner (born 19 June 1970) is a German retired Paralympic Nordic skier who won multiple gold medals throughout his career. He was the first person to fail a drugs test at the Winter Paralympic Games and was stripped of two gold medals. After he served his ban he returned to competitive skiing and participated in the 2006 and 2010 Games.

== Biography ==
Oelsner was born on 19 June 1970 and is currently an advertising salesman. In 1991 he was injured in a motorcycle accident which left him with a paralysed left arm. He entered the 1994 Winter Paralympics in Lillehammer as a LW6 class competitor in the biathlon and cross country skiing. Oelsner's first games were a success, winning three golds, one solo silver, and one silver as part of the German relay team. Since then he has continued to use the same skis, even sleeping with them, as a matter of tradition. At the 1998 Games in Nagano he won two golds and one individual silver, and a silver with the German relay team.

=== Failed drugs test ===
At the 2002 Winter Paralympics in Salt Lake City Oelsner won gold in the 7.5 km biathlon and the 5 km classic cross country. However, he would go on to become the first athlete to be sent home from a Winter Paralympic Games for failing a drug test when he tested positive for the steroid methenolone. He was suspended prior to the 10 km cross country event and subsequently stripped of the two gold medals. Oelsner protested his innocence, claiming that there had been a laboratory error or an act of sabotage involved.

=== Return to competition ===
Oelsner completed a six-month national ban and returned for the 2006 Winter Paralympics in Turin. He achieved a bronze in the 5 km cross country skiing.

At the 2010 Winter Paralympics in Vancouver Oelsner was embroiled in another controversy when he claimed that the sight on the gun he was using for the Biathlon had been sabotaged, smeared in something he thought might have been chocolate. He soon retracted the accusation and accepted responsibility, stating that whatever happened would have occurred when the gun was in his care. Oelsner announced his retirement from competitive skiing at the end of the 2010 Games.
