= Japan at the 1994 Winter Paralympics =

- IPC code: JPN
- NPC: Japan Paralympic Committee
- Website: www.jsad.or.jp (in Japanese)

in Lillehammer
- Competitors: 26
- Medals Ranked 18th: Gold 0 Silver 3 Bronze 3 Total 6

Winter Paralympics appearances (overview)
- 1976; 1980; 1984; 1988; 1992; 1994; 1998; 2002; 2006; 2010; 2014; 2018; 2022; 2026

Japan competed at the 1994 Winter Paralympics in Lillehammer, Norway. 26 competitors from Japan won 6 medals, 3 silver and 3 bronze, and finished 18th in the medal table.

== See also ==
- Japan at the Paralympics
- Japan at the 1994 Winter Olympics
