= Imai (disambiguation) =

Imai (Japanese: 今井) is a Japanese surname.

Imai or IMAI or variation, may also refer to:

== Places ==
- Imai (star), a star also called Delta Crucis (δ Cru), located in the southern hemisphere constellation of Crux (the Southern Cross)
- 8271 Imai, the asteroid Imai, 8271st asteroid registered
- Imai Station (Japanese: 今井駅, lit. 'Imai-eki'), Nagano, Nagano, Honshu, Japan; a train station

== Other uses ==
- Imai Foundation (Inter Media Art Institute), a German multimedia art institute
- The Mursi name for Melinis repens, a grass species

== See also ==
- The dictionary definition of 今井 at Wiktionary
- Imai Toonz (aka Imaitoonz), a mononym, a Japanese artist
- Kami-Imai Station, Nakano, Nagano, Honshu, Japan; a rail station
