= Japan at the 2002 Winter Paralympics =

- IPC code: JPN
- NPC: Japan Paralympic Committee
- Website: www.jsad.or.jp (in Japanese)

in Salt Lake City
- Competitors: 36
- Medals Ranked 22nd: Gold 0 Silver 0 Bronze 3 Total 3

Winter Paralympics appearances (overview)
- 1976; 1980; 1984; 1988; 1992; 1994; 1998; 2002; 2006; 2010; 2014; 2018; 2022; 2026

Japan competed at the 2002 Winter Paralympics in Salt Lake City, United States. 36 competitors from Japan won 3 medals, all bronze, and finished 22nd and last in the medal table.

== See also ==
- Japan at the Paralympics
- Japan at the 2002 Winter Olympics
