= Mikhail Terentyev =

Russian paralympic competitor

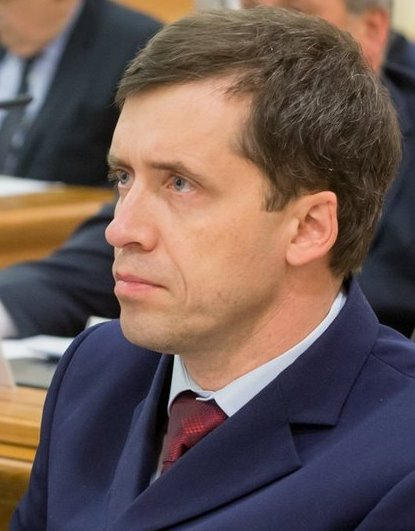

Personal information
- Born: 14 May 1970 (age 56) Krasnoyarsk, Russia

Sport
- Sport: Skiing
Medal record
Representing Russia
Men's cross-country skiing
Paralympic Games
Gold medal – first place	2002 Salt Lake	10 km sitski
Silver medal – second place	1998 Nagano	10 km sitski
Silver medal – second place	1998 Nagano	15 km sitski
Silver medal – second place	2002 Salt Lake	15 km sitski
Silver medal – second place	2002 Salt Lake	5 km sitski
Men's biathlon
Paralympic Games
Bronze medal – third place	1998 Nagano	7.5 km sitski
Bronze medal – third place	2006 Turin	12.5 km sitski
- Updated on June 6, 2010

Mikhail Borisovich Terentyev (Russian: Михаил Борисович Терентьев, born 14 May 1970 in Krasnoyarsk, Russia) is a Russian Paralympian, member of parliament, and secretary-general of the Russian Paralympic Committee, and the European Paralympic Committee.

He is a multiple medal winner at the Paralympic Games in biathlon and cross-country skiing.

== Sanctions ==
He is one of the members of the State Duma the United States Treasury sanctioned on 24 March 2022 in response to the 2022 Russian invasion of Ukraine.

He was sanctioned by the UK government in 2022 in relation to the Russo-Ukrainian War.
