= 1998 Winter Paralympics medal table =

1998 Winter Paralympics medals
- Location: Nagano, Japan

Highlights
- Most gold medals: Norway (18)
- Most total medals: Germany (44)
- Medalling NPCs: 21

The 1998 Winter Paralympics medal table is a list of National Paralympic Committees (NPCs) ranked by the number of gold medals won by their athletes during the 1998 Winter Paralympics, held in Nagano, Japan, from March 5 to March 14, 1998.

== Medal table ==
The ranking in this table is based on information provided by the International Paralympic Committee (IPC) and is consistent with IPC convention in its published medal tables. By default, the table is ordered by the number of gold medals the athletes from a nation have won (in this context, a "nation" is an entity represented by a National Paralympic Committee). The number of silver medals is taken into consideration next and then the number of bronze medals. If nations are still tied, equal ranking is given and they are listed alphabetically by IPC country code.

To sort this table by nation, total medal count, or any other column, click on the icon next to the column title.

* Host nation (Japan)

Rank	Nation	Gold	Silver	Bronze	Total
1	Norway	18	9	13	40
2	Germany	14	17	13	44
3	United States	13	8	13	34
4	Japan*	12	16	13	41
5	Russia	12	10	9	31
6	Switzerland	10	5	8	23
7	Spain	8	0	0	8
8	Austria	7	16	11	34
9	Finland	7	5	7	19
10	France	5	9	8	22
11	New Zealand	4	1	1	6
12	Italy	3	4	3	10
13	Czech Republic	3	3	1	7
14	Ukraine	3	2	4	9
15	Canada	1	9	5	15
16	Australia	1	0	1	2
16	Denmark	1	0	1	2
18	Slovakia	0	6	4	10
19	Sweden	0	1	5	6
20	Netherlands	0	1	1	2
21	Poland	0	0	2	2
Totals (21 entries)		122	122	123	367

== See also ==
- 1998 Winter Olympics medal table
