= Imai =

Imai (今井 — characters for "now" and "water well", meaning "new place of residence") is a Japanese surname.

The Japanese characters link to the Japanese-language Wikipedia

- Asami Imai (今井 麻美; born 1977), voice actress
- Eriko Imai (今井 絵理子; born 1983), artist and politician
- Haruka Imai (今井 遥; born 1993), Japanese figure skater
- Harumi Imai (今井 春美; born 1952), Japanese cross-country skier
- Hideki Imai (今井 秀樹; born 1943), Japanese cryptographer
- Hisae Imai (今井 寿恵; 1931–2009), photographer
- Hisashi Imai (今井 寿; born 1965), Japanese rock musician
- Isao Imai (disambiguation), multiple people
- Kenji Imai (disambiguation), multiple people
- Kohzoh Imai (今井 浩三; born 1948), Japanese scientist
- Kurumi Imai (今井 胡桃; born 1999), Japanese snowboarder
- Masaaki Imai (今井 正明; born 1930), Japanese organizational theorist
- Nobuko Imai (今井 信子; born 1943), classical violist
- Runa Imai (今井 月; born 2000), Japanese swimmer
- Sōkyū Imai (今井 宗久; 1520–1593)), merchant
- Tadashi Imai (今井 正; 1912–1991)), film director
- Tatsuya Imai (今井達也; born 1998), Japanese baseball player
- Tetsuo Imai (今井 哲夫; 1912–1987), Japanese middle-distance runner
- Tomoki Imai (今井 智基; born 1990), Japanese footballer
- Toshiaki Imai (今井 敏明; born 1954), football manager
- Tsubasa Imai (今井 翼; born 1981), Japanese singer and actor
- Yuka Imai (今井 由香; born 1970), voice actor
- Yuki Imai (今井 悠貴; born 1998), Japanese actor

== Fictional characters ==
- Hotaru Imai (今井 蛍), a character from Gakuen Alice
- Lisa Imai (今井 リサ), a character from BanG Dream!
- Nobume Imai (今井 信女), a character from Gintama
