= Poland at the 1998 Winter Paralympics =

- IPC code: POL
- NPC: Polish Paralympic Committee
- Website: www.paralympic.org.pl

in Nagano
- Competitors: 26 in 3 sports
- Medals Ranked 21st: Gold 0 Silver 0 Bronze 2 Total 2

Winter Paralympics appearances (overview)
- 1976; 1980; 1984; 1988; 1992; 1994; 1998; 2002; 2006; 2010; 2014; 2018; 2022; 2026

Poland competed at the 1998 Winter Paralympics in Nagano, Japan. 26 competitors from Poland won 2 medals, both bronze, and finished 21st in the medal table.

== Medalists ==
=== Bronze ===
- Danuta Poznańska - Cross-country skiing, Standing 5 km Individual Free ID
- Danuta Poznańska - Cross-country skiing, Standing 15 km Individual Classic ID

== Alpine skiing ==
Athlete	Event	Final			
Athlete	Event	Run	Rank	Calculated Time	Rank
Marek Brix	Slalom LW6/8	DNF		DNF	
Marek Brix	Giant slalom LW6/8	3:17.32	15	3:17.32	15
Marek Brix	Super gigant LW6/8	1:33.65	23	1:33.65	23
Piotr Marek	Slalom LW6/8	2:15.17	14	2:16.07	14
Piotr Marek	Giant slalom LW6/8	2:58.07	13	2:58.07	13
Piotr Marek	Super gigant LW6/8	1:25.39	22	1:25.39	22
Łukasz Szeliga	Slalom LW2	2:13.40	15	2:13.40	15
Łukasz Szeliga	Giant slalom LW2	DNF		DNF	
Łukasz Szeliga	Super gigant LW2	1:32.60	25	1:41.19	25
Janusz Hojka	Slalom LW4	2:19.45	8	2:20.80	8
Janusz Hojka	Giant slalom LW2	3:09.30	8	3:11.39	8
Janusz Hojka	Super gigant LW2	1:32.64	13	1:33.49	13
Janusz Wasil	Slalom LW4	2:30.01	9	2:31.46	9
Janusz Wasil	Giant slalom LW2	3:09.63	9	3:11.72	9
Janusz Wasil	Super gigant LW2	1:32.64	13	1:33.49	13

== Biathlon ==
Athlete	Events	Final				
Athlete	Events	Time	Misses	Factor	Finish time	Rank
Zenona Baniewicz	Standing Pursuit LW2-4,6/8,9	41:59.9	5	96	43:32.4	8
Wieslaw Fiedor	Sitting Pursuit LW12	35:36.7	3	100	35:36.7	5
Grazyna Gron	Standing Pursuit LW2-4,6/8,9	36:58.2	1	95	38:51.8	5
Bogumiła Kapłoniak	Standing Pursuit LW2-4,6/8,9	DNS				
Jan Kołodziej	Sitting Pursuit LW2,3,4,5/7,9	31:42.2	1	84	37:33.2	10
Piotr Kosewicz	Sitting Pursuit LW10	44:30.2	1	84	52:47.4	8
Marcin Koś	Sitting Pursuit LW2,3,4,5/7,9	30:27.6	4	85	35:07.8	8
Marcin Królikowski	Sitting Pursuit LW11	42:57.1	5	93	45:48.6	6
Andrzej Pietrzyk	Sitting Pursuit LW2,3,4,5/7,9	33:10.0	3	95	34:45.3	12
Beata Pomietło	Sitting Pursuit LW10-12	44:33.6	3	100	44:33.6	4
Mariusz Pyziak	Sitting Pursuit LW2,3,4,5/7,9	34:16.1	1	95	36:01.2	13
Piotr Sulkowski	Sitting Pursuit LW2,3,4,5/7,9	DNS				
Jerzy Szlęzak	Sitting Pursuit LW2,3,4,5/7,9	37:48.3	7	85	43:14.5	12
Robert Wator	Sitting Pursuit LW12	37:54.1	4	100	37:54.1	6
Jarosław Wiśniewski	Sitting Pursuit LW2,3,4,5/7,9	DNS				

== Cross‑country skiing ==
Athlete	Event	Final			
Athlete	Event	Real Time	Factor	Finish Time	Rank
Zenona Baniewicz	Standing 5 km Classic LW2-9	21:33.8	96	22:27.8	9
Zenona Baniewicz	Standing 5 km Free LW2-9	19:54.2	96	20:44.0	10
Zenona Baniewicz	Standing 15 km Classic LW2-9	DNF			
Monika Chrząszcz	Standing 5 km Classic ID	21:47.0	100	21:47.0	5
Monika Chrząszcz	Standing 5 km Free ID	19:57.4	100	19:57.4	5
Monika Chrząszcz	Standing 15 km Classic ID	DNF			
Wieslaw Fiedor	Sitting 5 km Classic LW12	19:46.8	100	19:46.8	6
Wieslaw Fiedor	Sitting 10 km Classic LW12	DNF			
Wieslaw Fiedor	Sitting 15 km Classic LW10-12	DNF			
Bogusław Graczyk	Sitting 15 km Free ID	38:49.4	100	38:49.4	17
Bogusław Graczyk	Sitting 20 km Free Classic ID	1:28:27.0	100	88:27.0	11
Grazyna Gron	Standing 5 km Classic LW2-9	22:15.1	92	24:11.3	11
Grazyna Gron	Standing 5 km Free LW2-9	20:43.6	95	21:49.1	11
Grazyna Gron	Standing 15 km Classic LW2-9	DNF			
Bogumiła Kapłoniak	Standing 5 km Free LW2-9	19:51.7	95	20:54.5	9
Bogumiła Kapłoniak	Standing 15 km Classic LW2-9	DNF			
Piotr Kawka	Sitting 5 km Classic ID	18:15.2	100	18:15.2	6
Piotr Kawka	Sitting 15 km Free ID	39:49.8	100	39:49.8	20
Piotr Kawka	Sitting 20 km Free Classic ID	1:22:53.0	100	82:53.0	4
Jan Kołodziej	Standing 5 km Classic LW3,4,9	19:12.9	87	22:05.2	15
Jan Kołodziej	Standing 15 km Free LW2,3.4.9	DNF			
Piotr Kosiewicz	Sitting 5 km Classic LW10	24:40.8	84	29:22.9	9
Piotr Kosiewicz	Sitting 10 km Classic Lw10	51:52.3	84	61:45.2	7
Marcin Kos	Standing 5 km Classic LW5-8	15:51.9	77	20:36.3	6
Marcin Kos	Standing 15 km Free LW5-8	30:59.9	85	36:28.2	5
Marcin Kos	Standing 20 km Free LW2-9	DNF			
Marcin Królikowski	Sitting 5 km Classic LW11	19:59.2	93	21:29.5	8
Marcin Królikowski	Sitting 10 km Classic Lw11	41:17.8	93	44:24.4	7
Marcin Królikowski	Sitting 15 km Classic Lw10-12	56:28.3	93	60:43.4	21
Monika Legierska	Standing 5 km Classic ID	22:26.3	100	22:26.3	6
Monika Legierska	Standing 5 km Free ID	21:55.9	100	21:55.9	7
Monika Legierska	Standing 15 km Classic ID	1:17:21.5	100	77:21.5	7
Andrzej Pietrzyk	Standing 5 km Classic LW5-8	17:45.0	92	19:17.7	17
Andrzej Pietrzyk	Standing 15 km Free LW5-8	35:06.7	95	36:57.6	18
Andrzej Pietrzyk	Standing 20 km Free LW2-9	DNF			
Beata Pomietło	Sitting 2,5 km Classic LW10-12	13:51.3	100	13:51.3	11
Beata Pomietło	Sitting 5 km Classic LW10-12	24:12.2	100	24:12.2	10
Beata Pomietło	Sitting 10 km Classic LW10-12	DNF			
Danuta Poznańska	Standing 5 km Classic ID	21:37.0	100	21:37.0	4
Danuta Poznańska	Standing 5 km Free ID	19:32.3	100	19:32.3	3rd place, bronze medalist(s)
Danuta Poznańska	Standing 15 km Classic ID	1:09:09.3	100	69:09.3	3rd place, bronze medalist(s)
Mariusz Pyziak	Standing 5 km Classic LW5-8	18:50.5	92	20:28.9	21
Mariusz Pyziak	Standing 15 km Free LW5-8	39:42.1	95	41:47.5	20
Mariusz Pyziak	Standing 20 km Free LW2-9	DNF			
Mateusz Sowa	Sitting 5 km Classic ID	19:02.6	100	19:02.6	12
Mateusz Sowa	Sitting 15 km Free ID	38:06.5	100	38:06.5	16
Mateusz Sowa	Sitting 20 km Free Classic ID	1:25:27.7	100	85:27.7	7
Piotr Sulkowski	Standing 5 km Classic LW3,4,9	DNF			
Piotr Sulkowski	Standing 15 km Free LW2,3.4.9	37:25.2	84	44:32.9	14
Piotr Sulkowski	Standing 20 km Free	DNF			
Jerzy Szlezak	Standing 5 km Classic LW5-8	16:39.7	77	21:38.4	11
Jerzy Szlezak	Standing 15 km Free LW5-8	DNF			
Jerzy Szlezak	Standing 20 km Free LW2-9	DNF			
Robert Wator	Sitting 5 km Classic LW12	20:24.6	100	20:24.6	8
Robert Wator	Sitting 10 km Classic LW12	41:56.9	100	41:56.9	8
Robert Wator	Sitting 15 km Classic Lw10-12	DNF			
Jarosław Wiśniewski	Standing 5 km Classic LW5-8	20:01.6	77	26:00.6	23
Jarosław Wiśniewski	Standing 15 km Free LW5-8	43:57.2	85	51:42.7	21
Jarosław Wiśniewski	Standing 20 km Free LW2-9	DNF			
Jan Kołodziej; Andrzej Pietrzyk; Mariusz Pyziak; Piotr Sulkowski	4 x 5 km Relay Standing	—N/a		1:26:33.7	4
Robert Wator; Wiesław Fiedor; Piotr Kosewicz	3 x 2.5 km Relay LW10-12	—N/a		39:26.3	6

== See also ==
- Poland at the Paralympics
- Poland at the 1998 Winter Olympics
