= Biathlon at the 2006 Winter Paralympics =

Biathlon at the IX Paralympic Winter Games
- Venue: Pragelato

At the 2006 Winter Paralympics, 12 biathlon events were contested at Pragelato.

== Medal table ==
Rank	Nation	Gold	Silver	Bronze	Total
1	Russia (RUS)	6	4	2	12
2	Ukraine (UKR)	3	6	3	12
3	Germany (GER)	1	1	2	4
4	Japan (JPN)	1	1	1	3
5	France (FRA)	1	0	1	2
6	Norway (NOR)	0	0	2	2
7	Canada (CAN)	0	0	1	1
Totals (7 entries)		12	12	12	36

== Events ==
Men

- 12.5 km
  - Sitting
  - Standing
  - Visually impaired
- 7.5 km
  - Sitting
  - Standing
  - Visually impaired

Women

- 10 km
  - Sitting
- 12.5 km
  - Standing
  - Visually impaired
- 7.5 km
  - Sitting
  - Standing
  - Visually impaired

== Men's events ==
=== Men's 7.5km ===
Event	Class	Gold		Silver		Bronze	
Men's 7.5 km	sitting	Vladimir Kiselev (RUS)	25:19.1	Iurii Kostiuk (UKR)	25:49.5	Sergiy Khyzhnyak (UKR)	25:51.2
Men's 7.5 km	standing	Rustam Garifoullin (RUS)	21:17.7	Josef Giesen (GER)	21:18.7	Nils Erik Ulset (NOR)	22:06.1
Men's 7.5 km	visually impaired	Irek Mannanov (RUS)	20:54.1	Vitaliy Lukyanenko (UKR)	21:56.8	Brian McKeever (CAN)	22:59.4

=== Men's 12.5km ===
Event	Class	Gold		Silver		Bronze	
Men's 12.5 km	sitting	Vladimir Kiselev (RUS)	46:46.5	Taras Kryjanovski (RUS)	47:34.7	Mikhail Terentiev (RUS)	49:15.2
Men's 12.5 km	standing	Rustam Garifoullin (RUS)	40:18.7	Alfis Makamedinov (RUS)	40:54.4	Nils Erik Ulset (NOR)	41:05.3
Men's 12.5 km	visually impaired	Vitaliy Lukyanenko (UKR)	38:54.9	Irek Mannanov (RUS)	39:15.4	Wilhelm Brem (GER)	41:24.2

== Women's events ==
=== Women's 7.5km ===
Event	Class	Gold		Silver		Bronze	
Women's 7.5 km	sitting	Olena Iurkovska (UKR)	28:03.4	Svitlana Tryfonova (UKR)	30:31.5	Lyudmyla Pavlenko (UKR)	32:34.6
Women's 7.5 km	standing	Alena Gorbunova (RUS)	25:54.2	Anna Burmistrova (RUS)	26:39.5	Anne Floriet (FRA)	26:40.5
Women's 7.5 km	visually impaired	Verena Bentele (GER)	27:07.6	Miyuki Kobayashi (JPN)	27:28.3	Elvira Ibraginova (RUS)	28:28.2

=== Women's 10km ===
Event	Class	Gold		Silver		Bronze	
Women's 10 km	sitting	Olena Iurkovska (UKR)	41:09.1	Lyudmyla Pavlenko (UKR)	42:25.1	Svitlana Tryfonova (UKR)	46:33.5

=== Women's 12.5km ===
Event	Class	Gold		Silver		Bronze	
Women's 12.5 km	standing	Anne Floriet (FRA)	47:45.1	Yuliya Batenkova (UKR)	50:50.3	Shoko Ota (JPN)	52:36.2
Women's 12.5 km	visually impaired	Miyuki Kobayashi (JPN)	49:04.5	Tetyana Smyrnova (UKR)	52:30.5	Verena Bentele (GER)	52:33.5

== See also ==
- Biathlon at the 2006 Winter Olympics
