= Japan at the 1984 Winter Paralympics =

- IPC code: JPN
- NPC: Japan Paralympic Committee
- Website: www.jsad.or.jp (in Japanese)

in Innsbruck
- Competitors: 15 in 2 sports
- Medals Ranked 15th: Gold 0 Silver 0 Bronze 0 Total 0

Winter Paralympics appearances (overview)
- 1976; 1980; 1984; 1988; 1992; 1994; 1998; 2002; 2006; 2010; 2014; 2018; 2022; 2026

Japan sent a delegation to compete at the 1984 Winter Paralympics, in Innsbruck, Austria.

Japan did not win any medals.

== Classification ==
Each event had separate standing, sitting, or visually impaired classifications:

- LW2 - standing: single leg amputation above the knee
- LW 3 - standing: double leg amputation below the knee, mild cerebral palsy, or equivalent impairment
- LW4 - standing: single leg amputation below the knee
- LW5/7 - standing: double arm amputation
- LW6/8 - standing: single arm amputation
- LW9 - standing: amputation or equivalent impairment of one arm and one leg
- B1 - visually impaired: no functional vision
- B2 - visually impaired: up to ca 3-5% functional vision

== Alpine skiing ==
Men

Athlete	Event	Run 1 (SG)			Run 2 (Sl)			Final/Total		
Athlete	Event	Time	Diff	Rank	Time	Diff	Rank	Time	Diff	Rank
Hideaki Amamoto	Slalom, LW2		+			+			+	
Sadami Fukasawa	Giant slalom, LW2		+			+			+	
Sadami Fukasawa	Downhill, LW2		+			+			+	
Yasunori Nakao	Giant slalom, LW2		+			+			+	
Koji Noro	Giant slalom, LW3		+			+			+	
Koji Noro	Slalom, LW3		+			+			+	
Koji Noro	Downhill, LW3		+			+			+	
Koichi Saeki	Giant slalom, LW6/8		+			+			+	
Koichi Saeki	Slalom, LW6/8		+			+			+	
Koichi Saeki	Alpine combination, LW6/8		+			+			+	
Koichi Saeki	Downhill, LW6/8		+			+			+	
Koshi Sato	Slalom, LW2		+			+			+	
Yukio Wakabayashi	Slalom, LW2		+			+			+	
Sato Wataru	Giant slalom, B2		+			+			+	
Sato Wataru	Downhill, B2		+			+			+	
Mikio Yamazaki	Giant slalom, LW2		+			+			+	

Women

Athlete	Event	Run 1 (SG)			Run 2 (Sl)			Final/Total		
Athlete	Event	Time	Diff	Rank	Time	Diff	Rank	Time	Diff	Rank
Yumi Ito	Giant slalom, LW2		+			+			+	
Yumi Ito	Slalom, LW2		+			+			+	
Junko Minemura	Giant slalom, LW4		+			+			+	
Junko Minemura	Slalom, LW4		+			+			+	

== Cross-country skiing ==
Men

Athlete	Events	Class	Factor %	Qualification		Semifinal		Final	
Athlete	Events	Class	Factor %	Time	Rank	Time	Rank	Time	Rank
?	4x10 km relay	B1-2							
Nobuyuki Iguchi	10 km short distance	B2							
Atsushi Komura	10 km short distance	B2							
Takeshi Kudo	10 km short distance	B2							
Atsushi Oishi	10 km short distance	B2							

== See also ==
- Japan at the 1984 Winter Olympics
- Japan at the Paralympics
