= Slovakia at the 1998 Winter Paralympics =

- IPC code: SVK
- NPC: Slovak Paralympic Committee
- Website: www.spv.sk

in Nagano
- Competitors: 18
- Medals Ranked 18th: Gold 0 Silver 6 Bronze 4 Total 10

Winter Paralympics appearances (overview)
- 1994; 1998; 2002; 2006; 2010; 2014; 2018; 2022; 2026

Other related appearances
- Czechoslovakia (1976–1992)

Slovakia competed at the 1998 Winter Paralympics in Nagano, Japan. 18 competitors from Slovakia won 10 medals, 6 silver and 4 bronze, and finished 18th in the medal table.

== Medalists ==
Medal	Name	Sport	Event
Silver	Jozef Mistina	Alpine skiing	Men's giant slalom LW1,3,5/7
Silver	Jozef Mistina	Alpine skiing	Men's slalom LW1,3,5/7
Silver	Stefan Kopcik	Alpine skiing	Men's giant slalom B2
Silver	Stefan Kopcik	Alpine skiing	Men's slalom B2
Silver	Robert Durcan	Alpine skiing	Men's slalom LW6/8
Silver	Miroslav Jambor	Biathlon	Men's 7.5 km free technique B3
Bronze	Jozef Mistina	Alpine skiing	Men's Downhill LW1,3,5/7,9
Bronze	Jozef Mistina	Alpine skiing	Men's Super-G LW1,3,5/7,9
Bronze	Stefan Kopcik	Alpine skiing	Men's Downhill B2
Bronze	Stefan Kopcik	Alpine skiing	Men's Super-G B2

== See also ==
- Slovakia at the Paralympics
- Slovakia at the 1998 Winter Olympics
