= Japan at the 1988 Winter Paralympics =

- IPC code: JPN

in Innsbruck, Austria
- Competitors: 13 (11 men and 2 women) in 1 sport
- Medals Ranked 14th: Gold 0 Silver 0 Bronze 2 Total 2

Winter Paralympics appearances (overview)
- 1976; 1980; 1984; 1988; 1992; 1994; 1998; 2002; 2006; 2010; 2014; 2018; 2022; 2026

Japan competed at the 1988 Winter Paralympics in Innsbruck, Austria. 13 competitors from Japan won two medals including zero gold, zero silver and two bronze and finished 14th in the medal table. All 13 competitors competed in alpine skiing.

== Alpine skiing ==
The medalists are:

- (bronze) Tsutomu Mino, Men's Giant Slalom LW1
- (bronze) Emiko Ikeda, Women's Giant Slalom LW10

== See also ==
- Japan at the Paralympics
- Japan at the 1988 Winter Olympics
