= Vladimir Kiselev =

Paralympic competitor of Russia

Personal information
- Born: 10 November 1974 (age 51) Istra, Russia

Sport
- Sport: Skiing
Medal record
Representing Russia
Paralympic Games
Men's cross-country skiing
Bronze medal – third place	2010 Vancouver	1 km sprint, sitting
Men's biathlon
Gold medal – first place	2006 Turin	12.5 km individual, sitting
Gold medal – first place	2006 Turin	7.5 km individual, sitting
Silver medal – second place	2010 Vancouver	12.5 km individual, sitting

Vladimir Kiselev (born 10 November 1974) is a Russian biathlete, cross-country skier, and two-time Paralympic champion. He competes in classification category sitting events.

== Career ==
Kiselev competed in biathlon and cross-country skiing at the 2006 Winter Paralympics. In biathlon, he took the gold in the men's 12.5 km individual and 7.5 km individual, sitski. In cross-country skiing, he placed 4th in the men's 10 km, 5th in the 15 km, and 6th in the 5 km, sitski. He placed 5th in the men's relay with Alfis Makamedinov and Kirill Mikhaylov.

Kiselev competed at the 2010 Winter Paralympics in cross-country skiing and biathlon. In cross-country skiing, he took the bronze medal in the 1 km sprint. He came in 6th place in the 10 km, sitting. In biathlon, he took the silver medal in the 12.5 km individual, sitting. He placed 4th in the men's 2.4 km pursuit, sitting.
