= Japan at the 1980 Winter Paralympics =

- IPC code: JPN

in Geilo, Norway
- Competitors: 5 (5 men and 0 women) in 1 sport and 6 events
- Medals Ranked 11th: Gold 0 Silver 0 Bronze 0 Total 0

Winter Paralympics appearances (overview)
- 1976; 1980; 1984; 1988; 1992; 1994; 1998; 2002; 2006; 2010; 2014; 2018; 2022; 2026

Japan competed at the 1980 Winter Paralympics in Geilo, Norway. In total five competitors from Japan won zero medals and the country finished 11th in the medal table.

All five competitors competed in alpine skiing.

== Alpine skiing ==
The following athletes represented Japan at the Men's Giant Slalom 1A and Men's Slalom 1A events:

- Sadami Fukasawa
- Tsuyoshi Ishii
- Shinobu Sakurai

Kotsuo Togase represented Japan at the Men's Giant Slalom 2A and Men's Slalom 2A events.

Hiroshi Yanagisawa represented Japan at the Men's Giant Slalom 3B and Men's Slalom 3B events.

== See also ==
- Japan at the Paralympics
- Japan at the 1980 Winter Olympics
