= Carmela Cantisani =

Italian para-alpine skier

Sport
- Country: Italy
- Sport: Paralympic alpine skiing
Medal record
World Disabled Ski Championships
Gold medal – first place	1986 Sälen	Giant Slalom B1
Gold medal – first place	1986 Sälen	Downhill B1
Paralympic Games
Bronze medal – third place	1988 Innsbruck	Downhill B1

Carmela Cantisani is an Italian para-alpine skier.

She represented Italy at the 1988 Winter Paralympics and she won the bronze medal in the Women's downhill B1 event. She also won the gold medals at the 1986 World Disabled Ski Championships at the Giant Slalom B1 and Downhill B1 events.
