= Japan at the 1976 Winter Paralympics =

- IPC code: JPN

in Örnsköldsvik, Sweden
- Competitors: 1 (1 man and 0 women) in 1 sport and 1 event
- Medals Ranked 10th: Gold 0 Silver 0 Bronze 0 Total 0

Winter Paralympics appearances (overview)
- 1976; 1980; 1984; 1988; 1992; 1994; 1998; 2002; 2006; 2010; 2014; 2018; 2022; 2026

Japan competed at the 1976 Winter Paralympics in Örnsköldsvik, Sweden. 1 competitor from Japan won 0 medals and finished 10th in the medal table.

== Alpine skiing ==
Sadami Fukasawa competed at the Men's Slalom I event and finished in 5th place out of 15 competitors.

== See also ==
- Japan at the Paralympics
- Japan at the 1976 Winter Olympics
