= Ukraine at the Paralympics =

- IPC code: UKR
- NPC: National Sports Committee for the Disabled of Ukraine
- Website: www.paralympic.org.ua
- Medals Ranked 16th: Gold 204 Silver 242 Bronze 247 Total 693

Summer appearances
- 1996; 2000; 2004; 2008; 2012; 2016; 2020; 2024

Winter appearances
- 1998; 2002; 2006; 2010; 2014; 2018; 2022; 2026

Other related appearances
- Soviet Union (1988); Unified Team (1992)

Ukraine made its Paralympic Games début at the 1996 Summer Paralympics in Atlanta, with thirty athletes competing in archery, track and field, powerlifting, swimming, and sitting volleyball. Vasyl Lishchynskyy won Ukraine's first Paralympic gold medal, in the shot put, and Ukrainians also won four silver medals and two bronze. Ukrainians had previously participated within the Soviet Union's delegation in 1988, and as part of the Unified Team in 1992. Ukraine, following its independence from the Soviet Union, missed out on the 1994 Winter Games, but made its Winter Paralympics début at the 1998 Winter Games in Nagano. Ukraine has competed at every edition of the Summer and Winter Games since then and have done so with remarkable success.

== Paralympic success ==
Competing as an independent country since 1996, Ukrainian athletes have won a total of 472 Paralympic medals on Summer Games, of which 149 gold, 213 silver and 213 bronze, placing the country 14th on the all-time Paralympic Games medal table. At the Winter Paralympics the country has won 141 medals at the Winter Games: 38 gold, 51 silver and 52 bronze. It has won more gold medals, and more medals overall, than any other former member of the Soviet Union, apart from Russia.

In the 2000s, Ukraine became a major Summer Paralympic power. While it had taken only seven medals at the 1996 Summer Games and finished in a unnoticed 44th place.Four years after in Sydney.The country improved their overall performance with 37 medals, but only 3 were gold, which put the country in a discreet 35th place. It ascended to the top ranks at the 2004 Games in Athens, sweeping up 55 medals, of which 24 gold, to finish sixth on the medal table. At the 2008 Games in Beijing, Ukrainians won 74 medals, of which 24 gold, and finished fourth – behind only China (1st), the United Kingdom (2nd) and the United States (3rd).

Ukraine has also been highly successful at the Winter Paralympics, its best result coming at the 2022 Games in Beijing, where it won 29 medals (including 11 gold) to finish second behind hosts China.

Valeriy Sushkevych, a former disability swimmer turned politician and member of Parliament, has been credited with "kick-start[ing] the Paralympic movement in the country". He helped establish a national Paralympic centre in 2002, and ensured that Ukrainian Paralympians were granted a specific budget, which sports official Karina Matiazh said was Ukraine's "biggest achievement. [...] [W]e have separate budgets for the Olympics and the Paralympics, whereas most other countries just get whatever bits and pieces are left over from their Olympic budget". Four-time Paralympic swimming champion Maksym Veraksa described Sushkevych as "a father figure" concerned with "each and every athlete".

Lviv Today noted in 2010 that "Ukraine’s Paralympic team has experienced a major boost in the amount of training and support it receives in recent years", resulting in "extraordinary" progress at the Winter Games in particular: "[F]rom finishing 18th in Salt Lake City in 2002, Ukraine rose to 3rd (2nd in terms of actual number of medals won) four years after in Turin. The China Daily in 2008 remarked that, in terms of the proportion of its medals in relation to the number of its athletes, Ukraine was "clearly punching above its weight". New Disability notes: "The only country which has consistently been amongst the top medal winners in both recent summer and winter Paralympic Games is Ukraine. This is due to a major strategy by Ukraine to support Paralympic Athletes".

Among Ukraine's most successful athletes is Viktor Smyrnov, who won five gold medals (as well as a silver and a bronze) in swimming (disability category 11) at the 2004 Summer Games. Ukraine also won the men's football 7-a-side competition at the 2004 Games, and successfully defended their title in 2008. Ukrainians have, in addition, won gold medals in track and field, cross-country skiing and biathlon, as well as one in powerlifting in 2004 (Lidiya Solovyova in the women's up to 40 kg) and one in wheelchair fencing that same year (Andriy Komar in the men's épée individual, category B).

== Medals ==
=== Medals by Summer Games ===
Games	Athletes	Gold	Silver	Bronze	Total	Rank
1960–1988	part of the Soviet Union					
(Spain) Barcelona 1992	part of the Unified Team					
(United States) Atlanta 1996	30	1	4	2	7	44
(Australia) Sydney 2000	67	3	20	14	37	35
(Greece) Athens 2004	90	24	12	19	55	6
(China) Beijing 2008	117	24	18	32	74	4
(United Kingdom) London 2012	148	32	24	28	84	4
(Brazil) Rio de Janeiro 2016	172	41	37	39	117	3
(Japan) Tokyo 2020	138	24	47	27	98	6
(France) Paris 2024	74	22	28	32	82	7
Total		171	190	193	554	14

=== Medals by Winter Games ===
Games	Athletes	Gold	Silver	Bronze	Total	Rank
1976–1988	part of the Soviet Union					
(France) Albertville 1992	part of the Unified Team					
(Norway) Lillehammer 1994	did not participate					
(Japan) Nagano 1998	11	3	2	4	9	14
(United States) Salt Lake City 2002	10	0	6	6	12	18
(Italy) Turin 2006	12	7	9	9	25	3
(Canada) Vancouver 2010	19	5	8	6	19	4
(Russia) Sochi 2014	23	5	9	11	25	4
(South Korea) Pyeongchang 2018	22	7	7	8	25	6
(China) Beijing 2022	20	11	10	8	29	2
(Italy) Milano Cortina 2026	25	3	8	8	19	7
Total		41	59	60	160	10

=== Medals by summer sport ===
Sport	Gold	Silver	Bronze	Total
Swimming	91	95	97	283
Athletics	38	55	44	137
Judo	7	4	14	25
Table tennis	4	4	10	18
Powerlifting	4	3	4	11
Cycling	4	3	1	8
Wheelchair fencing	3	6	8	17
Shooting	3	4	6	13
Paracanoeing	3	4	1	8
Rowing	3	2	1	6
Football 7-a-side	3	2	0	5
Archery	0	1	0	1
Volleyball	0	0	1	1
Totals (13 entries)	163	183	187	533

=== Medals by winter sport ===
Sport	Gold	Silver	Bronze	Total
Biathlon	25	34	34	93
Cross-country skiing	16	25	26	67
Totals (2 entries)	41	59	60	160

== Multi-medalists ==
Ukrainian athletes who have won at least three gold medals or five or more medals of any colour.

=== Summer Paralympics ===
No.	Athlete	Sport	Years	Games	Gender	Gold	Silver	Bronze	Total
1	Maksym Krypak	Swimming	2016-2020	2	M	10	4	1	15
2	Maksym Veraksa	Swimming	2008-2024	5	M	8	2	6	14
3	Ievgenii Bogodaiko	Swimming	2012-2024	4	M	6	5	5	16
4	Viktor Smyrnov	Swimming	2004-2012, 2020	4	M	6	4	5	15
5	Anna Stetsenko	Swimming	2016-2024	3	F	5	3	2	10
6	Yelyzaveta Mereshko	Swimming	2016-2020	2	F	5	2	2	9
7	Oleksii Fedyna	Swimming	2008-2016	3	M	5	2	1	8
8	Oksana Zubkovska	Athletics	2008-2024	5	F	5	0	0	5
9	Andrii Trusov	Swimming	2020-2024	2	M	4	5	1	10
10	Denys Dubrov	Swimming	2016-2020	2	M	4	3	4	11
11	Yegor Dementyev	Cycling	2012-2024	4	M	4	3	1	8
12	Ihor Tsvietov	Athletics	2016-2024	3	M	4	2	0	6
13	Dmytro Aleksyeyev	Swimming	2004-2008	2	M	4	1	2	7
13	Roman Pavlyk	Athletics	2008-2012	2	M	4	1	2	7
15	Oleksandr Mashchenko	Swimming	2000-2012	4	M	4	1	1	6
16	Sergii Klippert	Swimming	2004-2016	4	M	3	4	5	12
17	Taras Dutko	Football 7-a-side	2000-2016	5	M	3	2	0	5
17	Mariia Pomazan	Athletics	2012-2020	3	F	3	2	0	5
17	Vitaliy Trushev	Football 7-a-side	2000-2016	5	M	3	2	0	5
20	Lidiia Soloviova	Powerlifting	2000-2016	5	F	3	1	1	5
21	Volodymyr Antonyuk	Football 7-a-side	2000-2008, 2016	4	M	3	1	0	4
21	Nataliia Prologaieva	Swimming	2012	1	F	3	1	0	4
23	Hennadii Boiko	Swimming	2012-2016	2	M	3	0	0	3
24	Iaroslav Denysenko	Swimming	2016-2024	3	M	2	4	1	7
25	Dmytro Vynohradets	Swimming	2008-2012	2	M	2	3	2	7
26	Viktor Didukh	Table tennis	2016-2024	3	M	2	2	1	5
27	Inna Stryzhak	Athletics	2000-2012	4	F	2	1	4	7
28	Oleksandr Driha	Athletics	2004	1	M	2	1	2	5
29	Oksana Boturchuk	Athletics	2008-2012, 2020-2024	4	F	1	9	2	12
30	Olena Akopyan	Swimming	1996-2008	4	F	1	8	4	13

=== Winter Paralympics ===
No.	Athlete	Sport	Years	Games	Gender	Gold	Silver	Bronze	Total
1	Vitaliy Lukyanenko	Biathlon; Cross-country skiing	2006-2022	5	M	8	4	3	15
2	Oksana Shyshkova	Biathlon; Cross-country skiing	2014-2022	3	F	5	4	5	14
3	Oleksandra Kononova	Biathlon; Cross-country skiing	2010-2022	4	F	5	3	1	9
4	Olena Iurkovska	Biathlon; Cross-country skiing	2002-2014	4	F	4	5	5	14
5	Grygorii Vovchynskyi	Biathlon; Cross-country skiing	2010-2022	4	M	3	4	4	11
6	Liudmyla Liashenko	Biathlon	2014-2022	3	F	2	1	2	5
7	Iurii Kostiuk	Biathlon; Cross-country skiing	2006-2010	2	M	1	4	1	6
8	Lyudmyla Pavlenko	Biathlon; Cross-country skiing	2006-2014	3	F	1	1	5	7

== See also ==
- Ukraine at the Olympics
