= Isao Imai =

Isao Imai may refer to:

- Isao Imai (physicist) (1914–2004), Japanese theoretical physicist
- Isao Imai (judge) (born 1939), member of the Supreme Court of Japan
