= Japan at the 1998 Winter Paralympics =

- IPC code: JPN
- NPC: Japan Paralympic Committee
- Website: www.jsad.or.jp (in Japanese)

in Nagano
- Competitors: 67
- Flag bearer: Tadashi Kato
- Medals Ranked 4th: Gold 12 Silver 16 Bronze 13 Total 41

Winter Paralympics appearances (overview)
- 1976; 1980; 1984; 1988; 1992; 1994; 1998; 2002; 2006; 2010; 2014; 2018; 2022

Japan competed at the 1998 Winter Paralympics in Nagano, Japan. 67 competitors from Japan won 41 medals including 12 gold, 16 silver and 13 bronze and finished 4th in the medal table.

== See also ==
- Japan at the Paralympics
- Japan at the 1998 Winter Olympics
