= Kohzoh Imai =

Kohzoh Imai (今井浩三, Kohzoh Imai; born January 1, 1948) is a Japanese physician and oncologist specializing in molecular diagnosis and novel medical treatment of cancer. He is well known for the discovery of a Melanoma-related antigen (Chondroitin Sulfate Proteoglycan-4, or CSPG4) by producing a monoclonal antibody. In addition, he produced monoclonal antibodies against CEA or ICAM-1 and discovered their use in diagnosis and pathological analysis.

He is a former professor and president of Sapporo Medical University. He was a Council Member of the Science Council of Japan. Imai is currently a professor at the Institute of Medical Science at the University of Tokyo and the director of Kanagawa Cancer Center Research Institute. In 2013, he received the Medal of Honor with Purple Ribbon.

== Scientific Contributions ==
Imai discovered three kinds of protein tyrosine phosphatase (PTP) genes which control the signal transduction of cancer cells. His research on treatment with siRNA targeting PRDM14 molecules expressed in cancer cells is soon to be clinically applied to patients in Japan. Further, he developed a method to diagnose colorectal cancer utilizing a methylation of genes expressed in cancer cells.

== Biography and career ==
Imai was born in Hakodate, Hokkaido in 1948. After receiving an M.D. from Sapporo Medical University in 1972, he started his career at the Department of Internal Medicine (Division I) under the supervision of Professor Takeo Wada. He obtained his PhD from Sapporo Medical University in 1976. He worked at The Scripps Research Institute under the supervision of Prof. Ralph A. Reisfeld and Prof. Soldano Ferrone as an NIH post-doctoral research fellow from 1978 to 1981. Upon returning to Japan, he returned to Sapporo Medical University as a lecturer, where he was later promoted to a full professor in 1994. During this period, he had been to the United Kingdom to study under Nobel Laureate César Milstein at the MRC Laboratory of Molecular Biology in 1985. He was appointed as the 9th chairperson of Sapporo Medical University in 2004 and later the first president when it was restructured into a prefectural university corporation. Currently, he is a professor and the director of the research hospital at the University of Tokyo's Institute of Medical Science, as well as the director of Center for Antibody and Vaccine Therapy, the head of the Medical Innovation Promotion Office, and the director of Kanagawa Cancer Center Research Institute.
