= Kenji Imai =

Kenji Imai may refer to:

- Kenji Imai (actor) (今井 健二, born 1932), Japanese actor
- Kenji Imai (architect) (今井 兼次, 1895–1987), Japanese architect
