= Teuvo Ojala =

Finnish wrestler

Personal information
- Nationality: Finnish
- Born: 19 August 1947 Lappajärvi, Finland
- Died: 8 February 1991 (aged 43) Hyvinkää, Finland

Sport
- Sport: Wrestling

Teuvo Ojala (19 August 1947 – 8 February 1991) was a Finnish wrestler. He competed in the men's Greco-Roman 87 kg at the 1968 Summer Olympics.
