= Ukraine at the 1998 Winter Paralympics =

- IPC code: UKR
- NPC: National Sports Committee for the Disabled of Ukraine
- Website: www.paralympic.org.ua

in Nagano
- Competitors: 11
- Medals Ranked 14th: Gold 3 Silver 2 Bronze 4 Total 9

Winter Paralympics appearances (overview)
- 1998; 2002; 2006; 2010; 2014; 2018; 2022; 2026

Other related appearances
- Soviet Union (1988); Unified Team (1992)

Ukraine competed at the 1998 Winter Paralympics in Nagano, Japan. 11 competitors from Ukraine won 9 medals including 3 gold, 2 silver and 4 bronze and finished 14th in the medal table.

== See also ==
- Ukraine at the Paralympics
- Ukraine at the 1998 Winter Olympics
