= Susana Herrera =

Spanish skier (1962–2019)

Susana Herrera Jordán (26 March 1962 - 2 November 2019) was a ski athlete from Spain. She was born in Madrid, and lost her sight at the age of 23. She was a type B1 ski athlete. She raced at the 1988 Winter Paralympics, where she finished first in the downhill race and third in the giant slalom race.
