= Russia at the 1998 Winter Paralympics =

- IPC code: RUS
- NPC: Russian Paralympic Committee
- Website: www.paralymp.ru (in Russian)

in Nagano
- Competitors: 35
- Medals Ranked 5th: Gold 12 Silver 10 Bronze 9 Total 31

Winter Paralympics appearances (overview)
- 1994; 1998; 2002; 2006; 2010; 2014; 2018–2022; 2026

Other related appearances
- Soviet Union (1988); Unified Team (1992); Neutral Paralympic Athletes (2018)

Russia competed at the 1998 Winter Paralympics in Nagano, Japan. 35 competitors from Russia won 31 medals including 12 gold, 10 silver and 9 bronze and finished 5th in the medal table.

== See also ==
- Russia at the Paralympics
- Russia at the 1998 Winter Olympics
