= Austria at the 1998 Winter Paralympics =

- IPC code: AUT
- NPC: Austrian Paralympic Committee
- Website: www.oepc.at (in German)

in Nagano
- Competitors: 34
- Medals Ranked 8th: Gold 7 Silver 16 Bronze 11 Total 34

Winter Paralympics appearances (overview)
- 1976; 1980; 1984; 1988; 1992; 1994; 1998; 2002; 2006; 2010; 2014; 2018; 2022; 2026

Austria competed at the 1998 Winter Paralympics in Nagano, Japan. 34 competitors from Austria won 34 medals including 7 gold, 16 silver and 11 bronze and finished 8th in the medal table.

== See also ==
- Austria at the Paralympics
- Austria at the 1998 Winter Olympics
