= Germany at the 1998 Winter Paralympics =

- IPC code: GER
- NPC: National Paralympic Committee Germany
- Website: www.dbs-npc.de (in German)

in Nagano
- Competitors: 40
- Medals Ranked 2nd: Gold 14 Silver 17 Bronze 13 Total 44

Winter Paralympics appearances (overview)
- 1976; 1980; 1984; 1988; 1992; 1994; 1998; 2002; 2006; 2010; 2014; 2018; 2022; 2026

Germany competed at the 1998 Winter Paralympics in Nagano, Japan. 40 competitors from Germany won 44 medals including 14 gold, 17 silver and 13 bronze and finished 2nd in the medal table.

== See also ==
- Germany at the Paralympics
- Germany at the 1998 Winter Olympics
