= Anne Floriet =

French Paralympic athlete (born 1963)

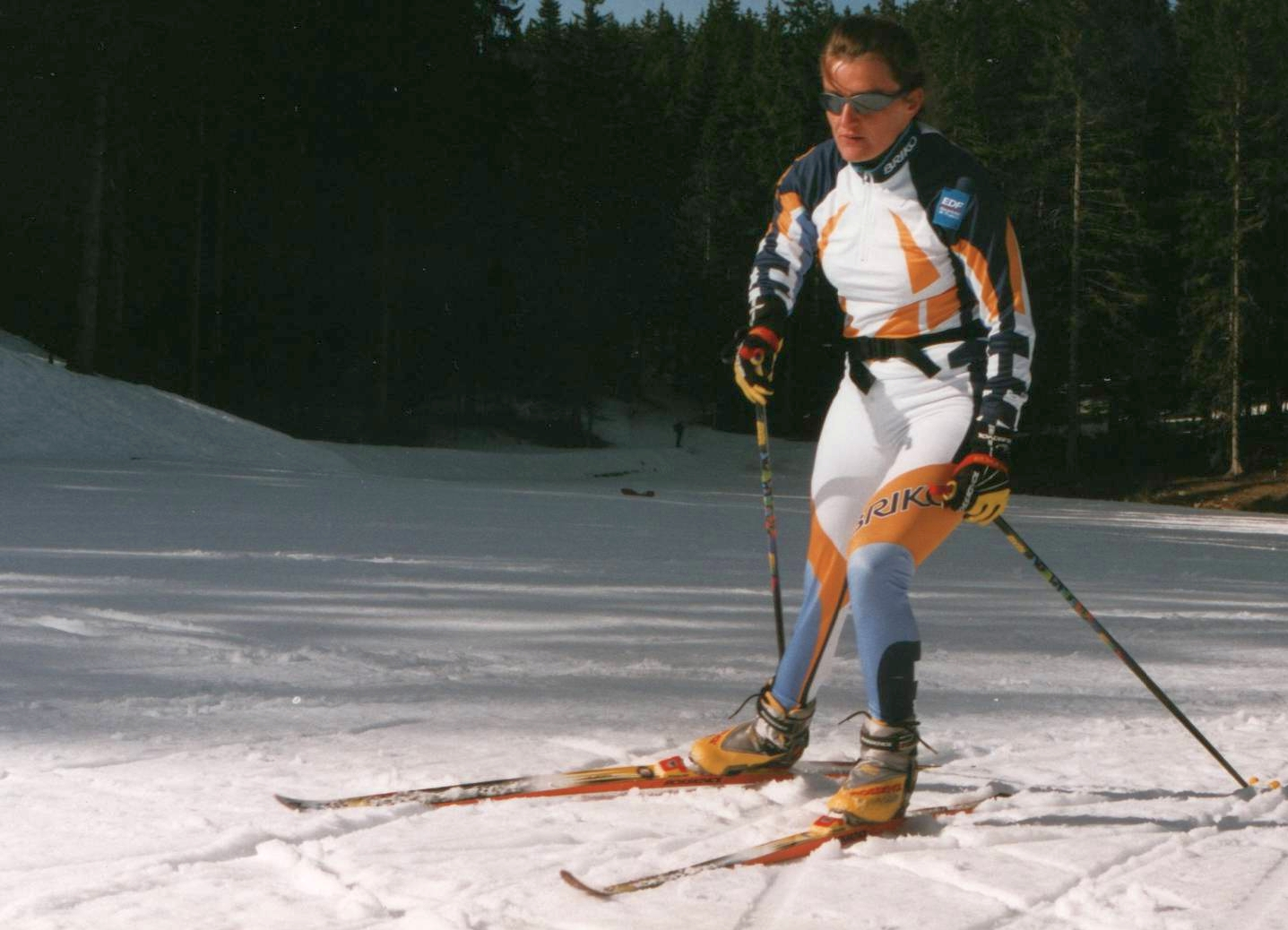
- Born: 1 June 1963 (age 62)

Anne Floriet (born 1 June 1963) is a successful French paralympic athlete in the Biathlon.

== Life ==
Floriet was born in 1963 and was found to have Ollier disease which is a non hereditary disease that effects bone structure.

Floriet competed at the 1998 and the 2002 Paralympics and as a result was chosen to be the flag bearer at next Paralympics.

In 2006 on the 11 March she won a Paralympic gold medal in the 12.5 km biathlon at the Games in Turin. Floriet also won two bronze medals at the shorter biathlon event and the 10 km skiing event.
