= Japan at the Paralympics =

- IPC code: JPN
- NPC: Japan Paralympic Committee
- Website: www.jsad.or.jp (in Japanese)
- Medals Ranked 18th: Gold 168 Silver 186 Bronze 205 Total 559

Summer appearances
- 1964; 1968; 1972; 1976; 1980; 1984; 1988; 1992; 1996; 2000; 2004; 2008; 2012; 2016; 2020; 2024

Winter appearances
- 1976; 1980; 1984; 1988; 1992; 1994; 1998; 2002; 2006; 2010; 2014; 2018; 2022; 2026

Whilst Japan has been absent at the inaugural Paralympic Games in 1960 (in the city of Rome), Japan made its Paralympic debut by hosting the 1964 Games in Tokyo. The country has participated in every subsequent edition of the Summer Paralympics and in every edition of the Winter Paralympics since the first in 1976. It has hosted the Paralympic Games twice, with Tokyo hosting the 1964 Summer Games and Nagano hosting the 1998 Winter Paralympics. The next Summer Paralympics in 2020 was held again in Tokyo. Japan is represented by the Japan Paralympic Committee.

Japan was the only Asian country to compete at the 1964 Paralympics and also the only Asian country present at the inaugural Winter Games, making it the first Asian nation to have participated in either the Summer or Winter Games. It is also the second-most successful Asian country at the Summer Games (only behind China), having won 427 Paralympic medals, of which 127 are gold, 140 are silver, and 160 are bronze. These results place it 17th in the Summer Games. At the Winter Paralympics, Japan is the second-most successful Asian nation (only behind China) with 101 medals, with 27 gold, 36 silver, and 38 bronze. These results put it in 14th place.

Japan won only a single gold medal at the Tokyo Games (in the men's doubles, category C, in table tennis), but rapidly improved, with two golds in 1968, four in 1972, and ten in 1976, with a peak at eighteen in 2004—though that number stayed at just five in 2008 and 2012. Despite having won 24 medals in Rio, the country returned without any gold medals—10 silver and 14 bronze. Five years later, at home, Japan finished with 13 gold medals and 11th place in the medal table.

In the Winter Games, the country emerged as a notable competitor when it hosted the Nagano Games in 1998, winning twelve gold medals, compared to none at all in previous editions, except for the 2002 Winter Paralympics, when the Japanese delegation won three bronze medals. Japan won all Winter Paralympics editions after Nagano. Being the best campaign, the last one in Beijing 2022, with 4 gold medals.

By far Japan's most successful Paralympian has been swimmer Mayumi Narita, who won fifteen gold medals for her country between 1996 and 2004, making her one of the world's most successful Paralympians of all time.

== Hosted Games ==
Japan has hosted the Games on three occasions, including the 2020 Summer Paralympics (which was postponed to 2021 due to the COVID-19 pandemic):

Games	Dates	Host city
1964 Summer Paralympics	8–12 November 1964	Tokyo
1998 Winter Paralympics	5–14 March 1998	Nagano
2020 Summer Paralympics	24 August – 5 September 2021	Tokyo

=== Unsuccessful bids ===
Games	City	Winner of bid
2008 Summer Paralympics	Osaka	Beijing, China
2016 Summer Paralympics	Tokyo	Rio de Janeiro, Brazil

== Medals ==
=== Medals by Summer Games ===
Host country (Japan)

Games	Gold	Silver	Bronze	Total
(Japan) 1964 Tokyo*	1	5	4	10
(Israel) 1968 Tel-Aviv	2	2	8	12
(West Germany) 1972 Heidelberg	4	5	3	12
(Canada) 1976 Toronto	10	6	3	19
(Netherlands) 1980 Arnhem	9	10	7	26
(United States) 1984 New York (United Kingdom) 1984 Stoke Mandeville	9	7	8	24
(South Korea) 1988 Seoul	17	12	17	46
(Spain) 1992 Barcelona	8	7	5	20
(United States) 1996 Atlanta	14	10	13	37
(Australia) 2000 Sydney	13	17	11	41
(Greece) 2004 Athens	17	15	20	52
(China) 2008 Beijing	5	14	8	27
(United Kingdom) 2012 London	5	5	6	16
(Brazil) 2016 Rio	0	10	14	24
(Japan) 2020 Tokyo*	13	15	23	51
(France) 2024 Paris	14	10	17	41
Totals (16 entries)	141	150	167	458

=== Medals by Winter Games ===
Host country (Japan)

Games	Gold	Silver	Bronze	Total
(Sweden) 1976 Örnsköldsvik	0	0	0	0
(Norway) 1980 Geilo	0	0	0	0
(Austria) 1984 Innsbruck	0	0	0	0
(Austria) 1988 Innsbruck	0	0	2	2
(France) 1992 Tignes-Albertsville	0	0	2	2
(Norway) 1994 Lillehammer	0	3	3	6
(Japan) 1998 Nagano*	12	16	13	41
(United States) 2002 Salt Lake City	0	0	3	3
(Italy) 2006 Turin	2	5	2	9
(Canada) 2010 Vancouver	3	3	5	11
(Russia) 2014 Sochi	3	1	2	6
(South Korea) 2018 Pyeongchang	3	4	3	10
(China) 2022 Beijing	4	1	2	7
(Italy) 2026 Milano Cortina	0	3	1	4
Totals (14 entries)	27	36	38	101

== Medals by sports ==
=== Medals by summer sport ===
Leading in that sport

Sport	Gold	Silver	Bronze	Total
Athletics	61	68	62	191
Swimming	30	30	41	101
Judo	12	9	11	32
Archery	5	12	9	26
Wheelchair tennis	4	1	5	10
Table tennis	3	5	9	17
Road cycling	3	2	6	11
Badminton	3	1	5	9
Track cycling	2	5	0	7
Lawn bowls	2	2	1	5
Boccia	1	2	1	4
Goalball	1	0	2	3
Wheelchair basketball	0	1	2	3
Paratriathlon	0	1	1	2
Wheelchair fencing	0	1	0	1
Dartchery	0	0	2	2
Wheelchair rugby	0	0	2	2
Weightlifting	0	0	1	1
Totals (18 entries)	127	140	160	427

=== Medals by winter sport ===
Leading in that sport

Sport	Gold	Silver	Bronze	Total
Alpine skiing	11	15	21	47
Ice sledge speed racing	9	12	11	32
Cross-country skiing	4	3	2	9
Biathlon	2	2	2	6
Snowboarding	1	0	1	2
Para ice hockey	0	1	0	1
Totals (6 entries)	27	33	37	97

== Multi-medalists ==
Japanese athletes who have won at least three gold medals or five or more medals of any colour.

=== Summer Games ===
No.	Athlete	Sport	Years	Games	Gender	Gold	Silver	Bronze	Total
1	Mayumi Narita	Swimming	1996-2004	3	F	15	3	2	20
2	Junichi Kawai	Swimming	1992-2008	5	M	5	9	7	21
3	Mineho Ozaki	Athletics	1984-2008	7	M	5	1	5	11
4	Shingo Kunieda	Wheelchair tennis	2004-2020	5	M	4	0	2	6
5	Takayuki Suzuki	Swimming	2004-2024	6	M	3	5	6	14
6	Keiichi Kimura	Swimming	2008-2012, 2020-2024	4	M	3	4	3	10
7	Toshihiro Takada	Athletics	2004-2008	2	M	3	2	2	7
8	Sarina Satomi	Badminton	2020-2024	2	F	3	1	0	4
9	Keiko Sugiura	Cycling	2020-2024	2	F	3	0	0	3
10	Maki Okada	Athletics	1988-1992	2	F	2	2	2	6
11	Noriko Arai	Athletics	1996-2004	3	F	2	2	1	5
12	Yoshikazu Sakai	Swimming	2000-2004	2	M	2	1	3	6
13	Erika Nara	Swimming	2000-2008	3	F	2	0	3	5
14	Kazu Hatanaka	Athletics	1996-2004	3	F	1	3	1	5
14	Tomoki Sato	Athletics	2016-2024	3	M	1	3	1	5
14	Teruyo Tanaka	Athletics	1996-2012	5	F	1	3	1	5

=== Winter Games ===
No.	Athlete	Sport	Years	Games	Gender	Gold	Silver	Bronze	Total
1	Momoka Muraoka	Alpine skiing	2014-2022	3	F	4	3	2	9
2	Yoshihiro Nitta	Cross-country skiing	1998-2022	7	M	3	1	1	5
3	Akira Kano	Alpine skiing	2006-2022	4	M	3	0	1	4
4	Kuniko Obinata	Alpine skiing	1994-2010	5	F	2	3	5	10

== See also ==
- Japan at the Olympics
