= Japanese Paralympic Committee =

National Paralympic Committee of Japan

Japanese Paralympic Committee 日本パラリンピック委員会

National Paralympic Committee
- Country: Japan
- Code: JPN
- Created: August 20, 1999
- Recognized: 1999
- Continental association: APC
- Headquarters: Tokyo, Japan
- President: Kazuyuki Mori
- Website: www.parasports.or.jp

Japanese Paralympic Committee (JPC) is a National Paralympic Committee (NPC) of Japan. The committee was established on August 20, 1999, and is recognized by International Paralympic Committee (IPC), Asian Paralympic Committee (APC) and Ministry of Health.

== See also ==
- Japan at the Paralympics
- Japanese Olympic Committee
