= 1998 Winter Paralympics =

Multi-parasport event in Nagano, Japan

VII Paralympic Winter Games
- Location: Nagano, Japan
- Motto: Fureai and Inspiration (Japanese: ふれあいと感動)
- Nations: 32
- Athletes: 571
- Events: 122 in 5 sports
- Opening: 5 March 1998
- Closing: 14 March 1998
- Opened by: Crown Prince Naruhito
- Closed by: IPC President Robert Steadward
- Cauldron: Naoya Maruyama
- Stadium: M-Wave

The 1998 Winter Paralympics (Japanese: 1998年冬季パラリンピック, Hepburn: 1998-Nen Tōki Pararinpikku), the seventh Paralympic Winter Games, were held alongside the Winter Olympics in Nagano, Nagano Prefecture, Japan, from 5 to 14 March 1998. They were the first Paralympic Winter Games to be held in Asia.

== Host city selection ==
In 1932, Japan won the rights to host the 1940 Summer Olympics in Tokyo. At that time, organizers of the Summer Olympics had priority in choosing the venue for the Winter Olympics the same year. Several Japanese cities, including Nagano, prepared a bid. Sapporo was chosen; however, the games never took place because of World War II. In 1961, Nagano declared its intention to host the 1968 Winter Olympics but lost to Sapporo, the winning Japanese bid, who lost to Grenoble, France, and Sapporo eventually won the right to host the 1972 Winter Olympics.

Japanese private sector organizations, in 1983, began publicly discussing a possible bid. Two years later, in 1985, the Nagano Prefectural Assembly, decided to begin the process to bid, for its third time, for a Winter Olympics. The bid committee was established in July 1986, they submitted their bid to the Japanese Olympic Committee (JOC) in November of the same year. Other Japanese cities that were bidding were Asahikawa, Yamagata, and Morioka. 1 June 1988, the JOC selected Nagano in the first round of national voting, receiving 34 of 45 votes. In 1989, the bid committee was reorganized, with the Japanese Prime Minister as head of the committee. The number of committee members was 511.

On 12 February 1990, the bid delegation presented its candidature at the International Olympic Committee in Lausanne before Juan Antonio Samaranch. Other candidate cities for the 1998 Olympics were Aosta, Italy; Jaca, Spain; Östersund, Sweden; Salt Lake City, United States, and Sochi, Soviet Union. The host city selection was held in Birmingham, United Kingdom, on 15 June 1991, at the 97th IOC session. After the first round of voting, Nagano led, with Aosta and Salt Lake City tied for last. Aosta was eliminated in a run-off against Salt Lake City. After the second round of voting, Nagano led with Salt Lake City in second, and Jaca was eliminated. Following round 3, Nagano continued to lead, with Salt Lake City in second, and Östersund was eliminated. Finally, Nagano prevailed over Salt Lake City by just 4 votes in the fifth round of voting, becoming the third Japanese city to host the games after Tokyo in 1964 Summer Olympics and Sapporo in 1972. Nagano, at 36°N, is the southernmost city in the Northern Hemisphere to host the Winter Olympics (1960 Winter Olympics host Squaw Valley, California is 39°N). In June 1995, Salt Lake was chosen as the host of the following 2002 Winter Olympics.

Following a 2002 Winter Olympic bid scandal that occurred in the summer of 2000, Atlanta, host of the 1996 Summer Olympics, Nagano, and Sydney, host of the 2000 Summer Olympics, were suspected of similar improprieties in bidding practices. Although nothing illegal was ever done, gifts to IOC members were considered morally dubious. The Nagano Olympic bid committee spent approximately $14 million to entertain the 62 International Olympic Committee members and many of their companions. The precise figures are unknown since Nagano, after the IOC asked that the entertainment expenditures not be made public, destroyed the financial records, according to bid member Junichi Yamaguchi.

1998 Winter Olympics bidding results
City	Country	Round				
City	Country	1	Run-Off	2	3	4
Nagano	Japan	21	—	30	36	46
Salt Lake City	United States	15	59	27	29	42
Östersund	Sweden	18	—	25	23	—
Jaca	Spain	19	—	5	—	—
Aosta	Italy	15	29	—	—	—

== Paralympic selection ==
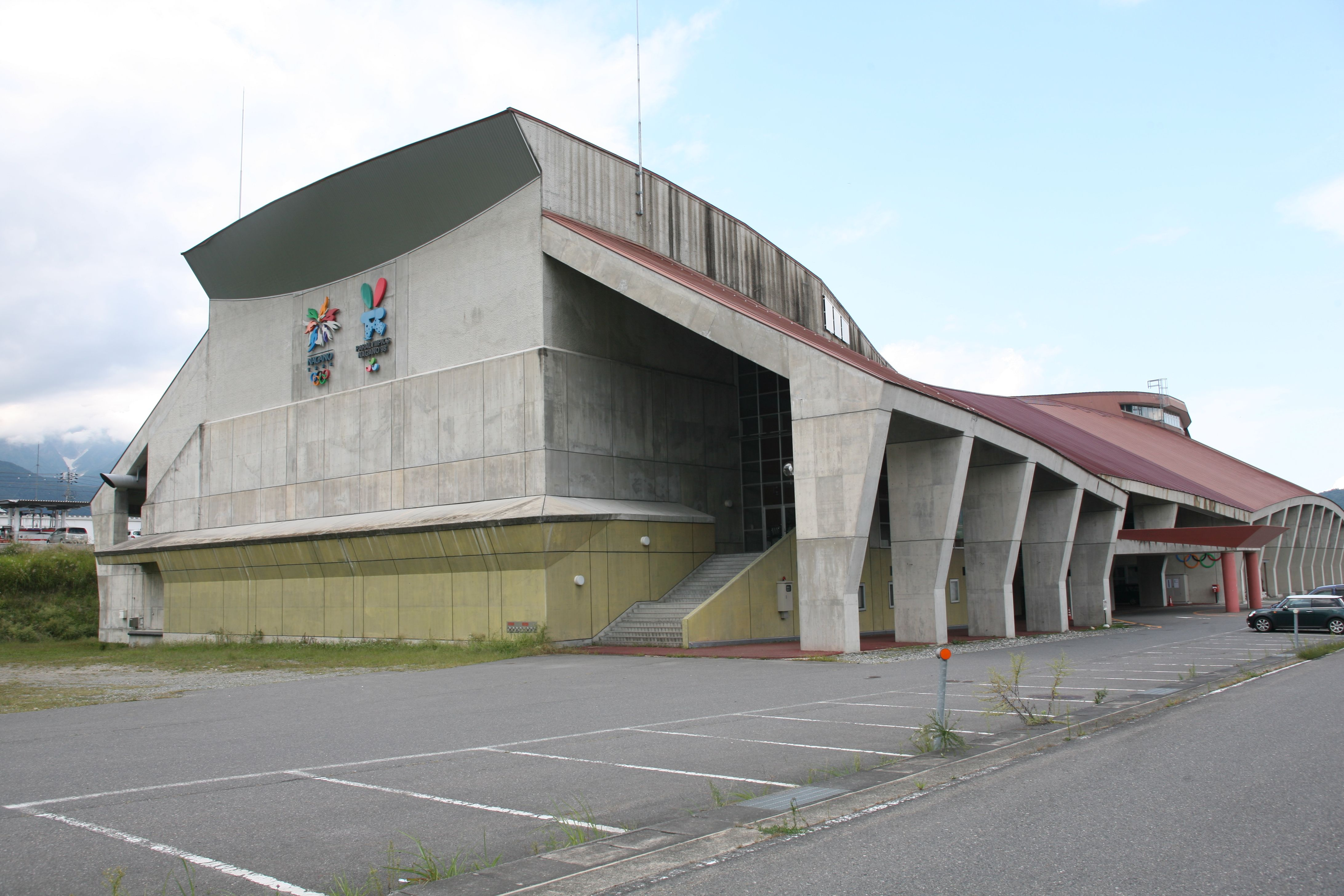
Wing 1,hosted the Press Center during the 1998 Olympic and Paralympic Winter Games

When the city of Nagano was selected to host the 1998 Winter Olympic Games on June 15, 1991, new demands arose from the International Paralympic Committee (IPC) and other stakeholders from around the world. Despite having been operational for only two years, the IPC had already shown a strong institutional interest regarding the realization of the 1998 Winter Paralympic Games in Nagano.As the committee recognized this as the perfect opportunity to expand adapted winter sports to Asia, strategically compelling the Japanese government to invest millions of yen in accessibility infrastructure across the country. This proactivity from the newly operational IPC met a highly favorable response in Japan, as international planners and local authorities recognized a profound emotional legacy and infrastructural commitment to adaptive sports in the country. This historical bond was deeply linked to the 1964 Summer Paralympics in Tokyo, which served as a watershed milestone for the global movement. As the first Paralympic Games ever held in Asia, the 1964 event marked the first time the term "Paralympics" gained widespread official traction and set a permanent benchmark for national mobilization. Furthermore, the success of the Tokyo Games had deeply influenced Japan's welfare policies and radically transformed public perception of disability. By tapping into this potent institutional memory, Nagano promoters and domestic planners successfully utilized this emotional capital as a powerful internal catalyst. This strategy allowed them to garner immediate, unanimous political backing from the municipal and prefectural assemblies, effectively transforming a complex logistical and financial challenge into a matter of national prestige, continuity, and an opportunity to replicate Tokyo's summer triumph within a winter sports framework on the continent. The goal was to ensure that the municipality also hosted the event that, at the time, was popularly referred to as "the other Olympics," scheduled for the same year. On November 8, 1991, the IPC formalized this mutual interest by sending an official document inviting Nagano to host the 7th edition of the Winter Paralympic Games. Rather than a routine bureaucratic step, this proactive invitation allowed the IPC to address serious operational concerns observed during the planning of 1992 Winter Paralympics. As this edition, the Paralympic events faced severe geographical isolation from the main Olympic hubs, alongside friction regarding calendar shifts and insufficient regional accessibility. To prevent these redundancies, the IPC's invitation to Nagano proposed an integrated hosting blueprint. The international body sought early commitments from Japanese planners to ensure the shared use of premier sports venues, the enforcement of universal design in the Paralympic Village, and the establishment of a centralized local Paralympic Organizing Committee (POC), thereby establishing a new global benchmark for administrative cooperation. In direct response to the IPC's strategic invitation, the Bid Committee for the 1998 Winter Paralympics was officially launched on July 30, 1992. This administrative milestone established a dedicated promotion framework to translate the initial political enthusiasm into concrete operational planning. The newly formed Promotion Council was chaired by the president of the Japan Sports Association for the Disabled (later known as the Japan Sports Association for the Physically Disabled) and was structured with a focused core of thirteen committee members and two observers. To ensure seamless alignment with municipal infrastructure and social policies, the head of the welfare department from Nagano City was appointed to a leadership role within the council, taking direct charge of promoting the bid project.

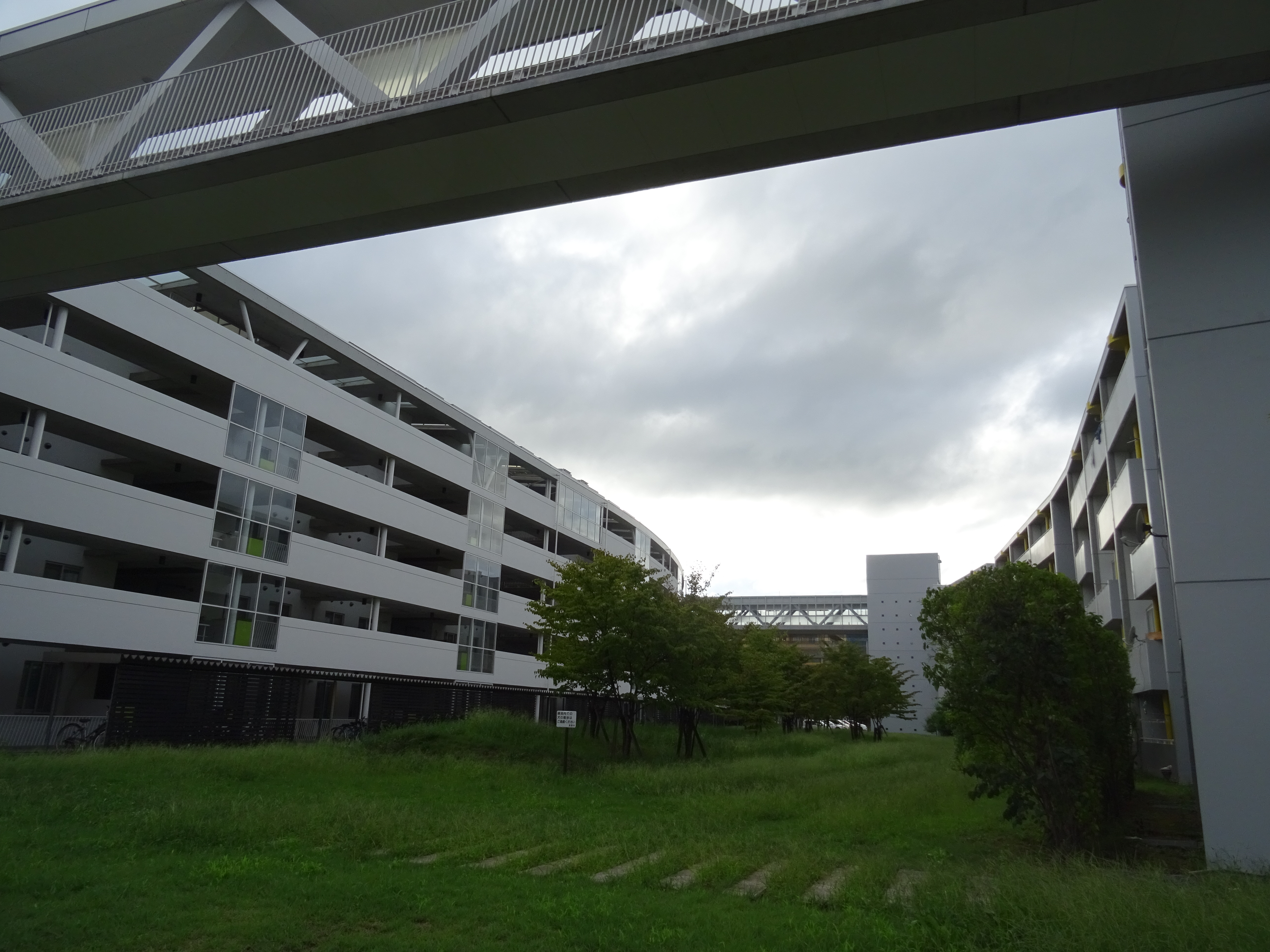
Olympic and Paralympic Village in Nagano

This strategic selection of a welfare specialist underscored the local government's commitment to prioritizing accessibility and universal design from the very inception of the Paralympic campaign, laying the bureaucratic groundwork required for the upcoming official assemblies. Structurally, this Promotion Council operated as a highly specialized coalition designed to bridge national sports expertise with municipal executive power. By placing the president of the Japan Sports Association for the Disabled at the helm, the committee secured a direct institutional link to adaptive sports governance and technical expertise. The core deliberative body—composed of thirteen committee members and two observers—was strategically streamlined to accelerate inter-agency decision-making and cross-departmental budgeting. Crucially, the appointment of Nagano City's head of the welfare department to lead the operational bid project shifted the campaign's focus from mere athletic promotion to comprehensive social infrastructure. This internal organization allowed the council to leverage municipal welfare resources and urban planning authority, ensuring that the rigorous integration and barrier-free standards demanded by the IPC were embedded into the city's legislative agenda from day one.

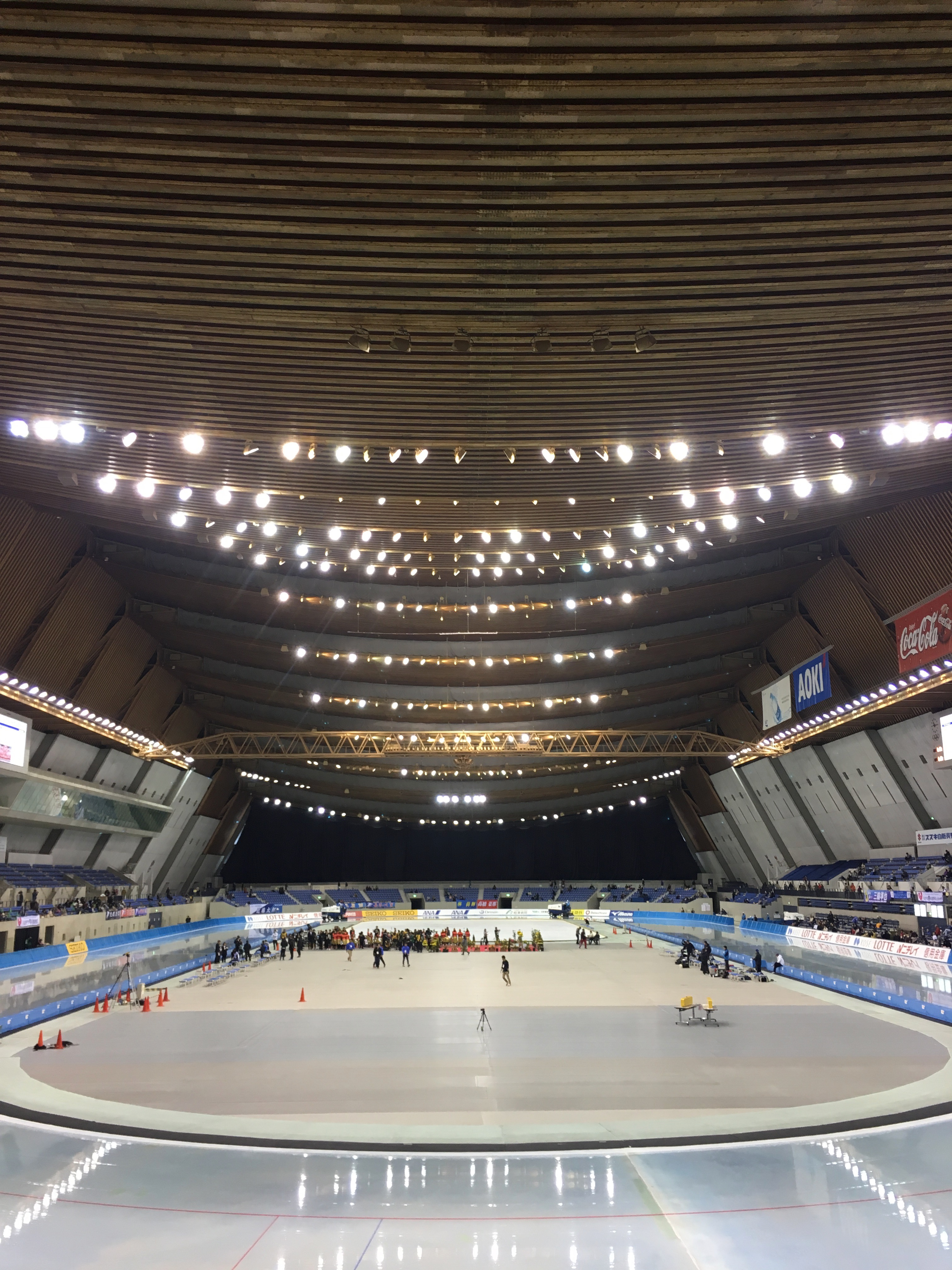
M-Wave interior

On June 25, 1993, the Nagano City Council transitioned the campaign from an administrative proposal to an official state-backed initiative by passing a formal resolution to host the Winter Paralympic Games. This legislative milestone triggered immediate political alignment across the region, as the Nagano Prefectural Assembly and relevant neighboring town and village assemblies passed matching resolutions shortly thereafter. By securing unanimous local governance backing, the Nagano Winter Paralympic Games Promotion Council finalized its official application and submitted it to the IPC on July 23 of the same year. This unified domestic front proved decisive on September 10, 1993, at the 4th IPC General Assembly held in Berlin, Germany, where Nagano was officially selected as the host city for the 1998 Winter Paralympic Games. However, despite the international acclamation, the local organizers still faced a six-month bureaucratic interim before the Host City Contract could be signed on March 7, 1994.

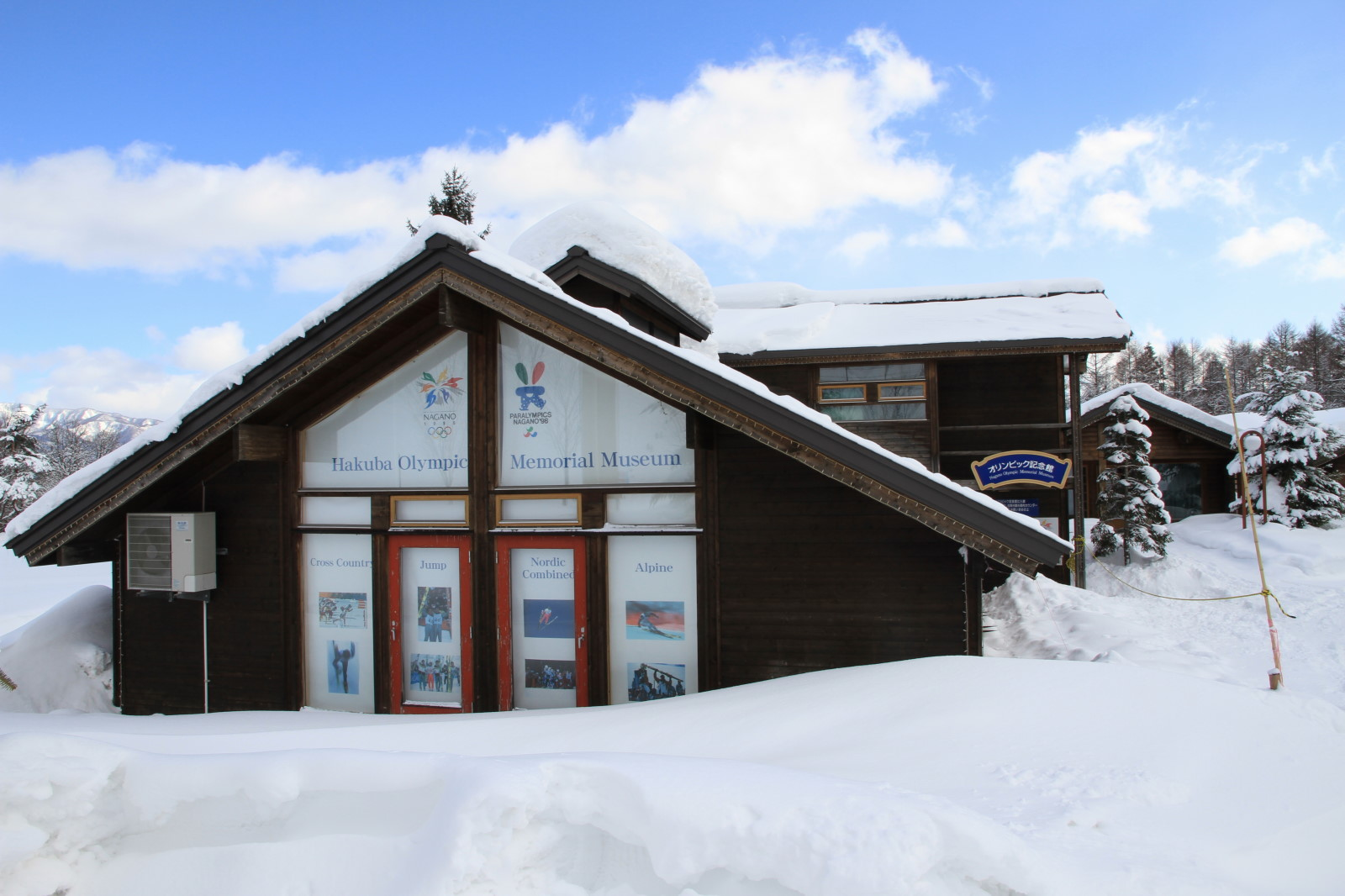
Hakuba Olympic Museum

Following the international selection in Berlin, the transition from a bidding campaign to an executive structure was formalized on November 16, 1993, with the official establishment of the Nagano Winter Paralympic Games Organizing Committee (NAPOC). This milestone marked the beginning of full-scale operational and logistical activities. To ensure immediate synergy between the municipal government and the newly formed organizing committee, Nagano City launched the Nagano City Olympic and Paralympic Liaison and Coordination Committee (NCOPLCC) on November 30, 1993. Chaired by Mayor Tasuku Tsukada and composed of the heads of related municipal departments, this coordination body was structured into nine specialized operational branches, including a dedicated public relations division. This joint administrative framework allowed the local government to synchronize city resources, infrastructure modifications, and public communication strategies directly with NAPOC's executive roadmap from the very outset.

== Flag handover and early infrastructure assessments (1994–1995) ==
The 1994 Paralympic flag

1994-2004 Paralympic Flag
- Creator: Lee Sung-Chu
- Significance: After the International Olympic Committee (IOC) complained that the five-drop design was causing market confusion and was too similar to the Olympic rings, the International Paralympic Committee (IPC) held an internal assembly in March 1992.

1994 served as the definitive operational turning point for the Japanese organizers. On March 7—just three days prior to the opening ceremony of the 1994 Winter Paralympics,the japanesese delegation officially signed the definitive Host City Contract with the IPC. This legal milestone formalized Japan's strict obligation to adhere to international accessibility and infrastructure standards. On March 19, 1994, during the closing ceremony in Lillehammer, the Paralympic flag was formally handed over to the Nagano representatives, arriving on Japanese soil on March 22. Crucially, this handover marked the official operational debut of the new Paralympic flag. Following intense marketing pressure from the IOC regarding the structural similarity between the previous five-Tae-Geuk logo and the Olympic rings, the IPC had approved a streamlined three-Tae-Geuk design (representing Mind, Body, and Spirit). While Lillehammer 1994 retained the older five-Tae-Geuk emblem due to its marketing program, the definitive transition to the new three-drop flag was executed during the handover to Nagano, meaning the Japanese organizers inherited the modernized global identity of the movement from the very start of their host tenure. Beyond the handover, the remaining months of 1994 exposed critical socio-cultural and financial realities for the newly formed organizers. To secure the event's economic viability, the Japanese government approved a specialized federal subsidy of ¥1.21 billion, directly allocated to cover NAPOC's preliminary setup costs and infrastructure assessments. However, as field evaluations began later that year, the committee faced severe operational friction. Deputy Secretary General Fumio Miyake documented that initial public interest regarding barrier-free facilities was remarkably low, creating significant hurdles in procuring adapted transportation and securing cooperation from local commercial venues. To combat this societal apathy, NAPOC and municipal authorities launched a series of high-profile public relations campaigns, initiated by a public reception to commemorate the arrival of the Paralympic flag. This strategy established a systematic countdown framework, leveraging milestone events to foster national awareness and pressure regional hospitality industries to adopt universal design principles. This administrative momentum culminated in the decisive professionalization of the project on April 1, 1995, when Nagano City established a specialized Paralympic Management sector within its municipal Disability Welfare Division. Moving beyond voluntary committees, this structural upgrade embedded career civil servants, civil engineers, and regulatory inspectors directly into daily operations, granting the local government the legal and bureaucratic teeth required to strictly enforce universal accessibility mandates across public and commercial spaces. Following this municipal stabilization, the definitive breakthrough in the event's global organizational architecture occurred on July 19, 1995. On this date, the Olympic (NAOC) and Paralympic (NAPOC) organizing committees executed a pioneering, comprehensive formal agreement to completely unify their executive operations, sports facilities, and workforce. Rejecting the separate "mirror organization" model utilized in Norway, which generated parallel legal overheads, Nagano's 1995 administrative fusion successfully established a single, unmitigated pipeline for logistics, procurement, and volunteer mobilization. This historic consolidation not only optimized financial efficiency but set the critical operational and philosophical precedent that inspired the International Olympic Committee (IOC) and the IPC to later institutionalize the global "One Bid, One City" policy in 2001, permanently mandating a unified co-hosting framework for all future Games. Simultaneously, as Nagano was solidifying this domestic fusion, the International Olympic Committee (IOC) was institutionalizing the Paralympic platform at the macro governance level. During the bidding cycle for the 2002 Winter Olympics—which culminated in June 1995—the IOC mandated for the first time that all applicant cities include a dedicated, comprehensive chapter within their official bid books outlining their operational and financial plans for the Winter Paralympics. This newly enforced requirement meant that when Salt Lake City secured the hosting rights in 1995, its organizing committee (SLOC) was structurally and legally pre-committed to integrating both Games. Consequently, Nagano's practical, single-staff laboratory in July 1995 did not evolve in isolation; rather, it directly mirrored and validated the IOC's emerging regulatory shift, proving to future host cities that the newly mandated Paralympic chapters were both operationally viable and financially optimized under a unified executive command.

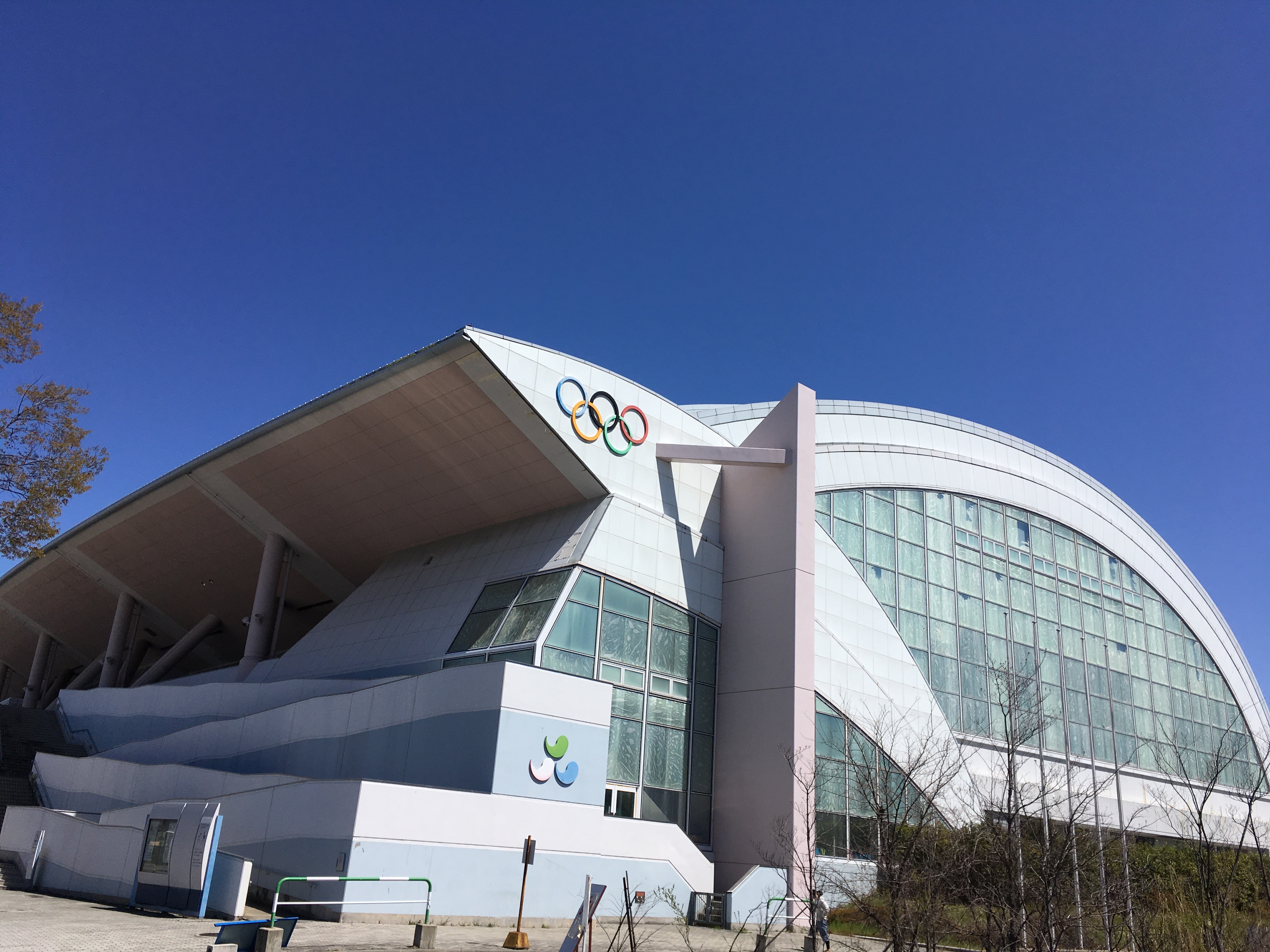
Aqua Wing,ice sledge hockey venue

== Preparations ==
The same delegation that was in Lillehammer to participate in the signing ceremony of the host city contract in Norway presented a cultural segment at the closing ceremony and received the Paralympic flag from the mayor of Lillehammer on March 19, 1994 and three days later on March 22 of that year, there was an official ceremony to receive the Paralympic flag.This was the first public main event to raise public awareness and understanding of the Games, and the construction of the Paralympic Village in Kawanakajima Imai, to meet the needs of people with disabilities.In addition, various citizen groups promoted projects to create a people-friendly town, where they conducted surveys to find out what problems people with various disabilities face in living a safe and comfortable life, and proposed countermeasures. After that, on June 17, 1996, 600 days before the 1998 Winter Olympics Opening Ceremonies, a joint management committee in which the common areas of the two events were merged, with the then mayor Tasuku Tsukada assuming the presidency of both and also exercising the coordination and intermediation function and the city divided the work of dispatching staff to the Games into eight departments: general affairs, facilities, environment, culture, spectators, transportation, Olympic venues, and Paralympic venues, and the organizing work started.After this event, the first measure action for the NAPOC was relative to the provide financial assistance, including operating subsidies, amounting to over ¥1.21 billion; second, to have the mayor and other city executives assumed the posts of vice-chairs and organizing committee members of NAPOC and in their respective functions; and third, to dispatch a total of 51 city employees to promote the work of NAPOC both before and after its establishment. In addition to this, 465 long-term and short-term support staff were dispatched to each venue during the Games. Another total of 64 people were dispatched from the Fire Department for acting during the Games.

Is also noted that there was an expansion of several programs designed for the Olympic Games for the Paralympic Games in order to expand the involvement of the local population in relation to the two events: one of them was "One School, One Country" and poster, painting, writing, drawing and slogan competitions for high school students.The "Happy Nagano Campaign" was also held, which included providing free pork soup to the general public and making souvenirs which were being sold to help finance various social projects.The engagement of the local population was so great that other groups and committees were created to provide support in other activities, such as the Nagano Paralympic Countdown Event Executive Committee, and the Nagano Paralympic Games Support Executive Committee. Among them, the "Nagano Para-Volunteer Association" was an organization made up of groups of people with disabilities and the volunteer groups that support them, and attracted attention for its unique activities, mainly in Nagano City, with the goal of "encouraging the Paralympic athletes and raising awareness of people with disabilities from a free perspective as citizens of the host city."It was said that the special ceremonies held at the milestones of 1000 days, 2 years, 500 days, 300 days, 100 days and the 50 days countdown, had the focus to awareness-raising activities were effective in livening up the Games and increasing citizens' sense of participation.The Nagano Public Relations magazine also played a major role in raising awareness of the Paralympics.

=== Visual identity ===
The philosophy of the Nagano Paralympic Winter Games was "To bring together physically disabled people from around the world, to expand the circle of friendship and international goodwill through sports, a culture shared by all mankind, to discover new possibilities, and to inspire bright hope and courage," and the main slogan of the Games is "Interaction and Inspiration." The other main slogan was chosen through public submissions, and was "Spreading, Communicating, and Rising Emotions," with the sub-slogans "You Shine in the Winter of '98 in Nagano," and "Shining Now, the Joy of Living, and Challenging Nagano." The symbol mark is an abbreviation of the character "Nagano" (cho) and depicts a rabbit running around happily and speedily on the snow and ice, enjoying the sport. The nickname of the mascot, created based on the symbol mark of the Games, was "Parabit."

== Mascot ==
Parabbit

Mascot of the 1998 Winter Paralympics (Nagano)
- Creator: Sadahiko Kojima
- Significance: A white rabbit resembling the Games logo

The 1998 Winter Paralympics Mascot was Parabbit. Parabbit is a white rabbit with one green and one red ear. Parabbit was chosen to complement the logo of the 1998 Winter Paralympics. It was created by Sadahiko Kojima. A nationwide competition was held among students to decide on the name, which drew 10,057 entries suggesting 3,408 different names.

== Torch relay ==
The torch for the Nagano Paralympics was lit by Japanese traditional methods on February 25, 1998 at Yoyogi Park Stadium, in Tokyo as legacy sign from the 1964 Summer Paralympics. After stops in Kanagawa Prefecture, Yokohama City, Shizuoka Prefecture, Aichi Prefecture, Nagoya City, and Gifu Prefecture, the torch arrived on Nagano Prefecture in Iida on February 26, where it was split in two. From there, it was carried to Nagano City by 125 relay teams from all cities, towns, and villages in the prefecture in two routes, from east and west. The flames were gathered at Nagano Central Square on March 4, evening, the day before the opening ceremony.The final stage began in the morning of the next day, when 24 teams made up of 3 people took turns until the evening of that day when the torch arrived at night during the opening ceremony being held on M-Wave. Two pyres were built for the Games. One was the stage cauldron for the opening ceremony, and another was a permanent one that burned until the end of the Games. A total of 754 relay runners covered 118.1 km during the torch relay.

== Opening ceremony ==
Hope
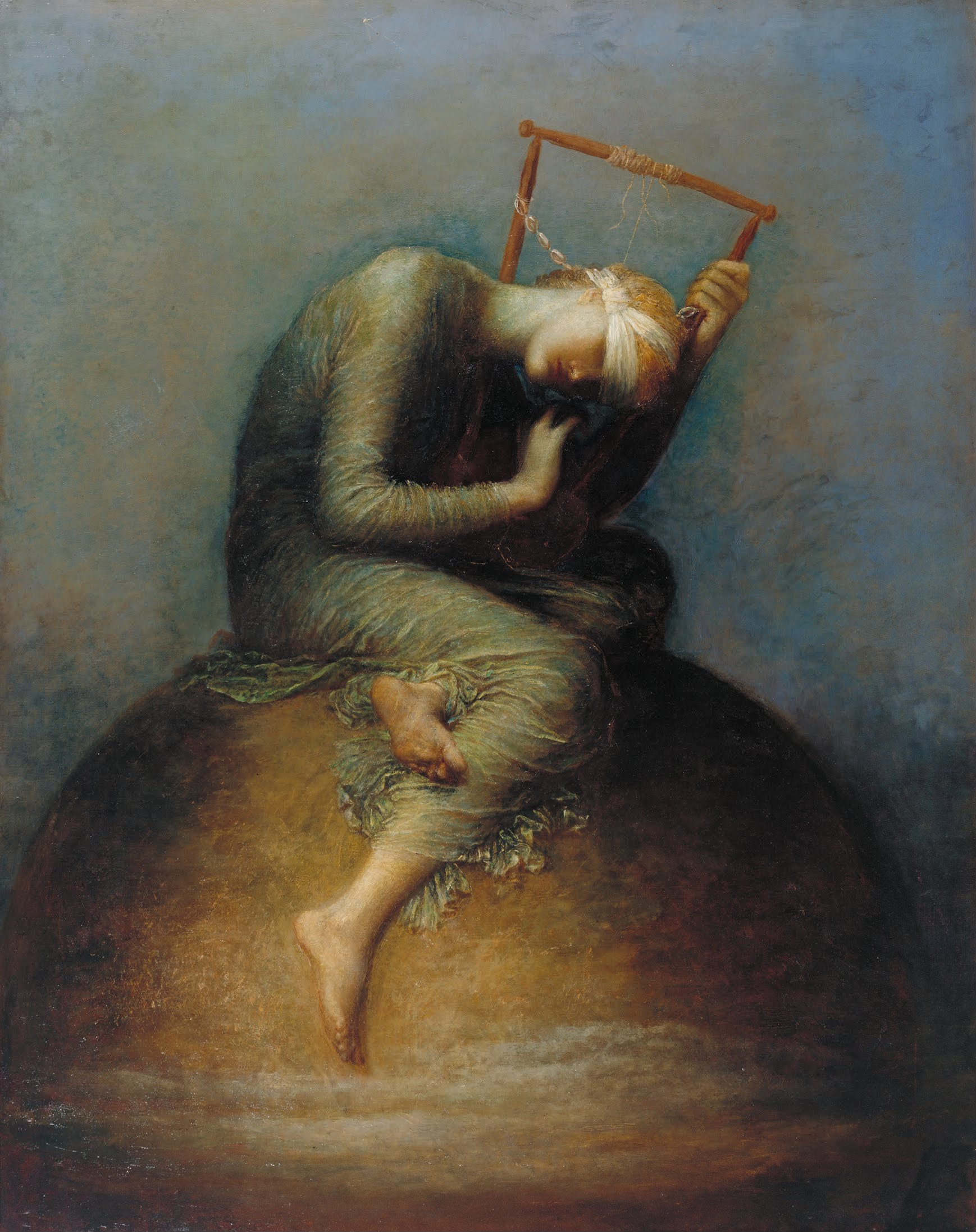
- Second version of Hope, 1886
- Artist: George Frederic Watts
- Year: 1886, further versions 1886–1895
- Type: Oil
- Dimensions: 142.2 cm × 111.8 cm (56.0 in × 44.0 in)
- Location: Tate Britain

The opening ceremony was held at M-Wave from 7:00 pm to 9:00 pm on March 5. Based on the theme of "HOPE," and was inspired by a painting by George Frederic Watts. The theme also signifies it was the first Winter Paralympics held in Asia and the last Paralympics of the 20th century.The ceremony was divided into two parts, a ceremony and a festival, and "fire (the Paralympic flame)" appeared as an important motif. It was an inspiring opening ceremony attended by approximately 1,150 athletes and officials, and approximately 7,700 spectators. The producers in charge of the production were Nagano-born composer Joe Hisaishi (general producer) and four others.The first part of the ceremony was the protocol: overture and fanfare, entrance of the athletes, speech by the president of NAPOC, opening declaration, entrance and hoisting of the IPC flag, entrance and lighting of the torch, oath of athletes and judges, and playing of the national anthem. The second part of the ceremony was performed in the following order: Hope (Hoshi no Sato), Fire (Hino Sato), Chaos (Kontono), Finale (Tabidachi) .

== The cauldron ==
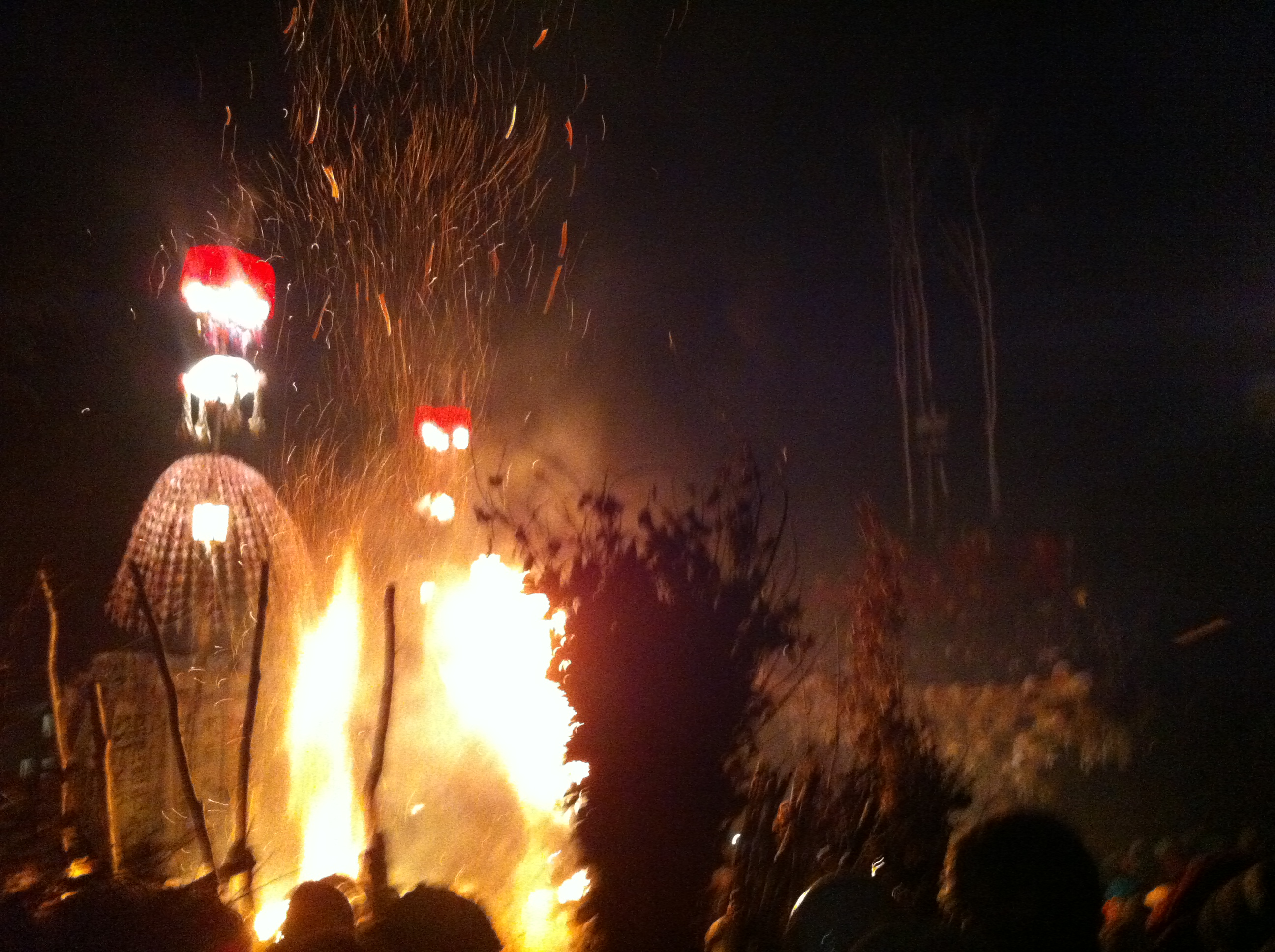
The "Dōsojin" Fire Festival in Nozawaonsen, Nagano

This was the last time that the organization of the Paralympic Games did not use the official Olympic cauldron, as the locations of the Olympic and Paralympic ceremonies were different. A scenographic cauldron was used during the opening ceremonies and thus, outside the M-Wave the organizers decided to build an official cauldron who reproduced the cauldron that is annually set up in Nozawaonsen village for the Sagichō Fire Festival. To allow the flame to burn continuously, people associated with the Fire Festival lit the cauldron outside the stadium.As the Olympic Games,smaller and similar cauldrons were also lit in Yamanouchi and Nozawaonsen .

== Closing ceremony ==
The closing ceremony of the Nagano Paralympics was held at M-Wave from 6:30 to 8:00 p.m. on March 14, 1998. The theme of the event was "Hope and Legacy," and was directed and created by actor Mansaku Nomura, who developed an event in which arts from across Asia and Japan mixed elements of Noh and Kyogen, two of the four forms of classical Japanese theater, and it was structured without distinguishing between a ceremony and a festival, with a new performing art " in a traditional Dengaku event " With the participation of about 1,150 athletes and officials, and about 8,000 spectators, the ceremony proceeded solemnly and movingly in the following order: entry of the athletes, raising of the national flags, dragon dance, and the protocol segments.The ceremony ended with the extinguishing of the Paralympic cauldron to the sound of "Ue o Muite Arukō" by Susan Osbourne.

It is noteworthy that the organizers of the Games, during the pre-production of the ceremony, asked by the official website, newspapers and the television to the Japanese population to send Orizuru made of paper to decorate the M-Wave as a wish of good luck for the future of the Paralympic Games. The paper crane is one of the best-known traditional symbols. The initial target of a million was quickly passed, and the stadium was decorated with 7.5 million cranes from 350,000 groups and individuals.

== Accommodation ==
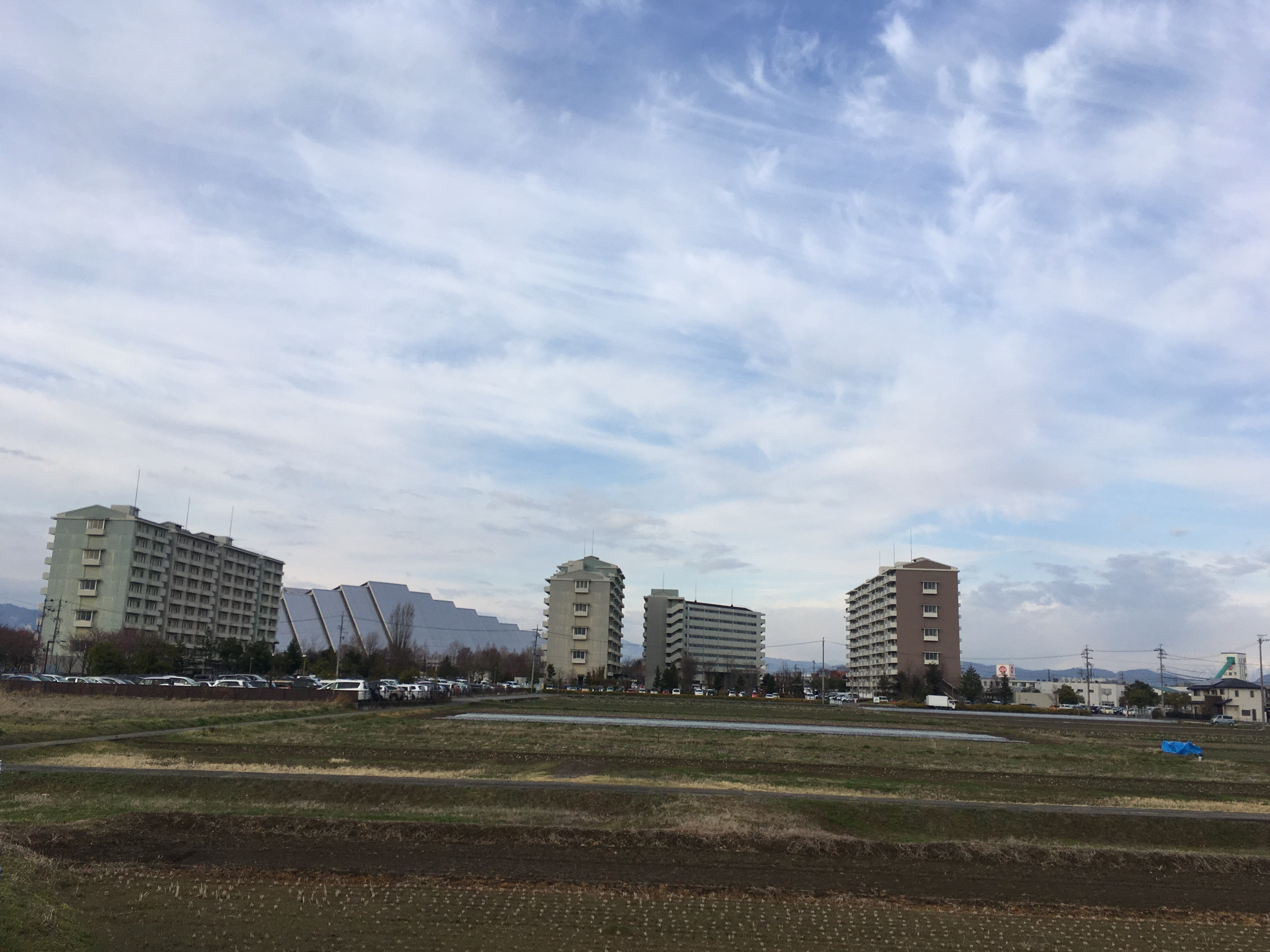
Media Village at Asahi, with the M-Wave in the background

To accommodate the athletes and officials during the Games, the main Olympic Village was constructed in Imai district, this complex approximately 7 kilometers south of Nagano Station. Along with the construction of the village, Imai Station was opened in 1997. The responsibility for the construction of these buildings lay with the Nagano City, as a future public and low coast residential housing and was loaned to the organizing committee during the Games. The main Village occupies an area that is 19 hectares, composed of 23 buildings with a total of 1,032 apartments. Temporary infrastrure were also available during the Games. The Village was open for the Olympics from 24 January to 25 February 1998 and 1 to 19 March for the Paralympics, and accommodated nearby 4,000 people during the two events.While the entire complex comprised 1,032 apartments distributed across 22 mid-rise residential buildings, the paralympic delegations were strategically concentrated within just 5 of these blocks. Rather than utilizing the central buildings, planners selected blocks positioned along the perimeter and near the main transport hubs. This layout optimized wheelchair logistics by minimizing transit distance to the adapted bus fleets and provided immediate, unhindered evacuation routes to the outer ring roads in the event of an emergency. To accommodate the influx of wheelchair users and athletes with amputations, the local engineering team prepared a total of 350 rooms with certified maximum accessibility. In these dormitories, the beds were lowered, the light switches and electrical outlets were installed at a standard height of 45 centimeters from the floor to avoid strain on reaching them, and the doors were widened to 90 centimeters to allow the free passage of sports wheelchairs, which are usually wider due to wheel camber.In the common areas of the Village, the main dining hall was structured to serve up to 4,000 meals daily and had its layout modified: the dining tables were spaced with 2-meter aisles between them, and traditional chairs were removed from several areas, allowing para-athletes to fit their wheelchairs directly under the picnic tables and counters. The great operational difference of the Olympic Village in 1998 was the installation of a technical repair center open 12 hours a day, managed in partnership with the prosthetics company Ottobock. In this space, competitors had free and immediate access to welding of racing sled chassis, changing wheelchair tires, and adjustments to carbon parts of high-performance ski prostheses, eliminating costs that could make the participation of smaller delegations unfeasible.Although the joint agreement of July 1995 successfully unified the operational workforce—ensuring that catering, transportation, IT support, and volunteer networks serviced both athletes' villages identically—the political faces and medical directorship shifted during the Paralympic transition. While the Olympic Village relied on cultural nobility and sports icons to serve as public figureheads, NAPOC appointed a highly specialized leadership core to manage the unique technical demands of the Kawanakajima Imai complex.Former JAL Executive Teichi Kuribayashi was appointed as the Mayor of the Paralympic Village, bringing corporate governance and administrative expertise to the residential operations. He was supported by two Deputy Mayors Dr. Kenji Shima, a prominent specialist in physical medicine and rehabilitation who oversaw the village's complex clinical and adaptive logistics, and Reiko Sano, a local community leader who managed the hospitality and local volunteer sectors. This distinct administrative tier was crucial; hosting hundreds of athletes with severe physical and impairment profiles required an executive leadership anchored in medical rehabilitation and specialized urban transit—technical capabilities that fell outside the scope of traditional Olympic sports administration.Finally, two media villages were built in the districts of Yanagimachi, near Nagano Station, which housed 2,300 people, and Asahi, across the street from the M-Wave, accommodating 1,200 personnel. Together, these complexes safely housed a combined total of 3,500 accredited international and domestic press professionals in single-occupancy rooms.While the official Paralympic Family comprised approximately 1,450 officials who generated 16,634 overnight stays at the Kokusai 21 Hotel, the television, radio, and print media teams generated an additional 42,100 overnight stays in the Yanagimachi and Asahi villages.Hotel operations in the media villages and partner hotels recorded significant occupancy rates for broadcast and technical support personnel during the Paralympic window in March.As their Olympic counterpart,the Paralympic family stayed in the Kokusai 21 in downtown Nagano.Typically low,the partner hotels recorded significant occupancy rates in March.

== Sports ==
The games consisted of 122 events in five sports: alpine skiing, ice sledge hockey, ice sledge racing, and Nordic skiing. The sport of Nordic skiing comprised two disciplines, the biathlon and cross-country skiing.

- Alpine skiing
- Sledge hockey
- Ice sledge racing
- Nordic skiing
  - Biathlon
  - Cross-country skiing

== Venues ==
In total seven venues were used at the 1998 Winter Olympics around four cities and towns.

=== Nagano City ===
- M-Wave – opening/closing ceremonies, ice sledge racing
- Aqua Wing Arena – ice sledge hockey

=== Hakuba ===
- Happo'one Resort: Alpine skiing (Downhill and Super-G)
- Snow Harp, Kamishiro: Cross-country skiing

=== Nozawaonsen ===
- Nozawa Onsen Ski Resort: Biathlon

=== Yamanouchi ===
- Mount Higashidate: Alpine skiing (giant slalom)
- Mount Yakebitai, Shiga Kogen Resort: Alpine skiing (slalom)

== Calendar ==
In the following calendar for the 1998 Winter Paralympics, each blue box represents an event competition. The yellow boxes represent days during which medal-awarding finals for a sport were held. The number in each yellow box represents the number of finals that were contested on that day.

●	Opening ceremony	●	Event competitions	●	Event finals	●	Closing ceremony

March	5th	6th	7th	8th	9th	10th	11th	12th	13th	14th
Ceremonies	●									●
Alpine Skiing		7		6	15		10	5	11	5
Biathlon		12								
Cross-country skiing				12		15		3		10
Ice sledge hockey	●	●		●		●		●	●	1
Ice sledge speed racing			8		4		4			

== Medal table ==
The top 10 NPCs by number of gold medals are listed below. The host nation (Japan) is highlighted.

Rank	Nation	Gold	Silver	Bronze	Total
1	Norway	18	9	13	40
2	Germany	14	17	13	44
3	United States	13	8	13	34
4	Japan*	12	16	13	41
5	Russia	12	10	9	31
6	Switzerland	10	5	8	23
7	Spain	8	0	0	8
8	Austria	7	16	11	34
9	Finland	7	5	7	19
10	France	5	9	8	22
Totals (10 entries)		106	95	95	296

== Participants ==
Thirty-one National Paralympic Committees (NPCs) entered athletes at the 1998 Winter Paralympics. The number in parentheses indicates the number of participants from each NPC.

- Armenia (8)
- Australia (4)
- Austria (34)
- Belarus (5)
- Bulgaria (3)
- Canada (33)
- Czech Republic (6)
- Denmark (3)
- Estonia (15)
- Finland (21)
- France (25)
- Germany (40)
- Great Britain (21)
- Iran (2)
- Italy (21)
- Japan (67)
- Kazakhstan (1)
- South Korea (4)
- Netherlands (3)
- New Zealand (5)
- Norway (43)
- Poland (26)
- Russia (35)
- Slovakia (18)
- Slovenia (1)
- South Africa (1)
- Spain (14)
- Sweden (24)
- Switzerland (19)
- Ukraine (11)
- United States (49)

== See also ==
- 1998 Winter Olympics

Preceded by Lillehammer	Winter Paralympics; Nagano; VII Paralympic Winter Games (1998)	Succeeded by Salt Lake City
