= Rhodesia at the Paralympics =

- Flag of Rhodesia
- IPC code: RHO
- Medals: Gold 21 Silver 18 Bronze 15 Total 54

Summer appearances
- 1960; 1964; 1968; 1972; 1976; 1980; 1984; 1988–1992; 1996; 2000; 2004; 2008; 2012; 2016; 2020; 2024

Rhodesia was one of the participants at the inaugural Paralympic Games in 1960 in Rome, where one of its two representatives was Margaret Harriman, in swimming and archery. The country took part in every edition of the Summer Paralympics until 1972. Although Rhodesia was barred from all Olympics from 1968 until its disestablishment in 1979 after its 1965 Unilateral Declaration of Independence from the United Kingdom, it was allowed to participate in the 1968 Tel Aviv and 1972 Heidelberg games because politicians, both from Britain and the host nations of the games, were unwilling to sanction athletes with disabilities. However, the Canadian government refused to grant visas for the Rhodesian Paralympic team to attend the 1976 Toronto Paralympics.

Rhodesia ceased to exist before the 1980 Summer Paralympics, in which its successor state, Zimbabwe, competed.

== List of medalists ==
Over their four appearances, Rhodesians won a total of 21 gold medals, 18 silver and 15 bronze.

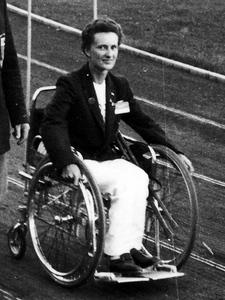
Margaret Harriman at the 1960 Summer Paralympics in Rome

Medal	Name	Games	Sport	Event
Gold	Margaret Harriman	1960 Rome	Archery	FITA round open
Gold	Margaret Harriman	1960 Rome	Archery	Windsor round open
Gold	Margaret Harriman	1964 Tokyo	Archery	Albion round open
Gold	Margaret Harriman	1964 Tokyo	Archery	FITA round open
Gold	Margaret Harriman; George Mann	1964 Tokyo	Dartchery	Mixed pairs open
Gold	Lynette Gilchrist	1964 Tokyo	Athletics	Club throw B
Gold	Lynette Gilchrist	1964 Tokyo	Athletics	Javelin throw B
Gold	Lynette Gilchrist	1964 Tokyo	Swimming	50m freestyle prone incomplete class 3
Gold	Lynette Gilchrist	1964 Tokyo	Swimming	50m freestyle supine incomplete class 3
Gold	Lynette Gilchrist	1964 Tokyo	Swimming	50m breaststroke incomplete class 3
Gold	Leslie Manson-Bishop	1964 Tokyo	Swimming	50m freestyle supine complete class 4
Gold	Leslie Manson-Bishop	1964 Tokyo	Swimming	50m breaststroke complete class 4
Gold	Jacqueline Thompson	1968 Tel Aviv	Athletics	Shot put B
Gold	Leslie Manson-Bishop	1968 Tel Aviv	Swimming	50m backstroke complete class 4
Gold	Andrew James Scott	1968 Tel Aviv	Swimming	50m breaststroke class 4 incomplete
Gold	Sandra Coppard	1968 Tel Aviv	Swimming	25m freestyle class 1 incomplete
Gold	Sandra Coppard	1968 Tel Aviv	Swimming	25m breaststroke class 1 incomplete
Gold	Andrew James Scott	1972 Heidelberg	Swimming	75m individual medley 4
Gold	Sandra James	1972 Heidelberg	Swimming	25m freestyle 1A
Gold	Sandra James	1972 Heidelberg	Athletics	Javelin throw 1A
Silver	Lynette Gilchrist	1964 Tokyo	Athletics	Discus throw B
Silver	Lynette Gilchrist	1964 Tokyo	Athletics	Shot put B
Silver	Leslie Manson-Bishop	1964 Tokyo	Athletics	Pentathlon 2
Silver	Leslie Manson-Bishop	1964 Tokyo	Swimming	50m freestyle prone complete class 4
Silver	Lynette Gilchrist; Leslie Manson-Bishop; Keith Pienaar	1964 Tokyo	Swimming	Medley relay open
Silver	Gesina Smit	1968 Tel Aviv	Athletics	Javelin throw C
Silver	Peter Goldhawk	1968 Tel Aviv	Swimming	50m backstroke class 3 incomplete
Silver	Jacqueline Thompson	1968 Tel Aviv	Swimming	50m freestyle class 3 incomplete
Silver	Avril Davis	1968 Tel Aviv	Swimming	50m backstroke class 5 (cauda equina)
Silver	Virginia Tomlinson	1968 Tel Aviv	Swimming	25m breaststroke class 2 incomplete
Silver	Andrew James Scott	1972 Heidelberg	Swimming	50m backstroke 1B
Silver	Eileen Robertson	1972 Heidelberg	Swimming	25m freestyle 1B
Silver	Sandra James	1972 Heidelberg	Swimming	25m breaststroke 1A
Silver	Eileen Robertson	1972 Heidelberg	Swimming	25m breaststroke 1B
Silver	Sandra James	1972 Heidelberg	Athletics	Shot put 1A
Bronze	Keith Pienaar	1964 Tokyo	Athletics	Discus throw B
Bronze	Leslie Manson-Bishop	1964 Tokyo	Athletics	Javelin throw C
Bronze	David Holland	1968 Tel Aviv	Swimming	25m freestyle class 1 incomplete
Bronze	Glynn Griffiths	1968 Tel Aviv	Swimming	25m backstroke class 1 incomplete
Bronze	Virginia Tomlinson	1968 Tel Aviv	Swimming	25m freestyle class 2 incomplete
Bronze	Jacqueline Thompson	1968 Tel Aviv	Swimming	50m backstroke class 3 incomplete
Bronze	David Holland	1972 Heidelberg	Swimming	25m freestyle 1B
Bronze	Kevin English	1972 Heidelberg	Swimming	100m backstroke 5
Bronze	Andrew James Scott	1972 Heidelberg	Swimming	50m breaststroke 1B
Bronze	Sandra James	1972 Heidelberg	Athletics	Discus throw 1A

Andrew James Scott went on to compete for Zimbabwe, winning a number of silver and bronze medals in 1980.

== See also ==
- Zimbabwe at the Paralympics
- Rhodesia at the Olympics
