= Zimbabwe at the Paralympics =

- IPC code: ZIM
- NPC: Zimbabwe National Paralympic Committee
- Medals: Gold 2 Silver 9 Bronze 6 Total 17

Summer appearances
- 1960; 1964; 1968; 1972; 1976; 1980; 1984; 1988–1992; 1996; 2000; 2004; 2008; 2012; 2016; 2020; 2024

Zimbabwe has been competing at the Paralympic Games since the country became independent in 1980; it had previously competed as Rhodesia. Zimbabwe was absent from the Games in 1988 and 1992, returning in 1996 with a two-man delegation, and has competed at every edition of the Summer Paralympics since then. It has never taken part in the Winter Paralympics.

Zimbabweans have won a total of 2 gold medals, 9 silver, and 6 bronze. The country's most successful year, by far, was 1980, when Zimbabweans won 8 silver medals and 4 bronze - all but two won by Sandra James and Eileen Robertson, across events in several sports. Zimbabwe's first gold medal was won by Elliot Mujaji in 2000, in the 100m sprint (T46 category). Mujaji won Zimbabwe's second (and most recent) Paralympic gold medal in the same event four years later. Zimbabwe have since failed to win any medals after 2004.

The Zimbabwe National Paralympic Committee was only officially launched and registered in 2010. Prior to this, "the government provided financial aid during the Paralympic Games, [but] there was no co-ordinated mechanism to maintain athletes' momentum between the Games", and athletes "had to find their own sponsor, coach and manager who would finance the training, travelling and their participation at competitions".

== Medals by Summer Games ==
Games	Gold	Silver	Bronze	Total
1980 Arnhem	0	8	4	12
1984 Stoke Mandeville	0	1	2	3
1996 Atlanta	0	0	0	0
2000 Sydney	1	0	0	1
2004 Athens	1	0	0	1
2008 Beijing	0	0	0	0
2012 London	0	0	0	0
2016 Rio de Janeiro	0	0	0	0
2020 Tokyo	0	0	0	0
2024 Paris	0	0	0	0
Totals (10 entries)	2	9	6	17

== Medalists ==
Medal	Name	Games	Sport	Event
Silver	Sandra James	(Netherlands) 1980 Arnhem	Athletics	Women's club throw 1A
Silver	Sandra James	(Netherlands) 1980 Arnhem	Athletics	Women's discus throw 1A
Silver	Mary Dube	(Netherlands) 1980 Arnhem	Athletics	Women's javelin throw 3
Silver	Sandra James; Eileen Robertson	(Netherlands) 1980 Arnhem	Lawn bowls	Women's pairs 1A-1B
Silver	Sandra James	(Netherlands) 1980 Arnhem	Swimming	Women's 25m breaststroke 1A
Silver	Eileen Robertson	(Netherlands) 1980 Arnhem	Swimming	Women's 25m breaststroke 1B
Silver	Sandra James	(Netherlands) 1980 Arnhem	Table tennis	Women's singles 1A
Bronze	Eileen Robertson	(Netherlands) 1980 Arnhem	Lawn bowls	Women's singles 1A-1B
Bronze	Andrew James Scott	(Netherlands) 1980 Arnhem	Swimming	Men's 50m backstroke 3
Bronze	Eileen Robertson	(Netherlands) 1980 Arnhem	Swimming	Women's 25m backstroke 1B
Silver	Eddie van der Heiden	(United Kingdom) (United States) 1984 Stoke Mandeville/New York	Lawn bowls	Men's singles A2/4
Bronze	M. Ndlovu	(United Kingdom) (United States) 1984 Stoke Mandeville/New York	Athletics	Women's discus throw 5
Bronze	R. Mukuya	(United Kingdom) (United States) 1984 Stoke Mandeville/New York	Athletics	Women's javelin throw 1B
Gold	Elliot Mujaji	(Australia) 2000 Sydney	Athletics	Men's 100m T46
Gold	Elliot Mujaji	(Greece) 2004 Athens	Athletics	Men's 100m T46

== See also ==
- Rhodesia at the Paralympics
- Zimbabwe at the Olympics
