= Swimming at the 1980 Summer Paralympics =

Swimming at the VI Paralympic Games
- Paralympic Swimming

Swimming at the 1980 Summer Paralympics consisted of 192 events.

In certain events, there were only three competitors, thus guaranteeing each a medal upon successfully completing the race. In others, there were fewer than three; in the women's 4x100 metre freestyle relay C-D, for instance, the Canadian team swam unopposed, obtaining gold upon completing the event. The women's 3x50 metre medley relay CP C was the only event in which no medal was awarded. The United States team were the only competitors, but were disqualified during the race; thus, no team completed the event.

== Medal table ==
Rank	Nation	Gold	Silver	Bronze	Total
1	Poland (POL)	40	19	23	82
2	Canada (CAN)	25	15	13	53
3	Netherlands (NED)	24	15	13	52
4	United States (USA)	21	15	20	56
5	West Germany (FRG)	19	15	11	45
6	Great Britain (GBR)	18	10	7	35
7	Sweden (SWE)	17	22	17	56
8	Israel (ISR)	7	9	3	19
9	Norway (NOR)	4	8	4	16
10	France (FRA)	4	7	10	21
11	Argentina (ARG)	4	4	3	11
12	Yugoslavia (YUG)	2	3	3	8
13	Mexico (MEX)	2	3	1	6
14	Spain (ESP)	1	10	6	17
15	Australia (AUS)	1	8	2	11
16	Jamaica (JAM)	1	3	0	4
17	Colombia (COL)	1	0	1	2
17	New Zealand (NZL)	1	0	1	2
19	Iceland (ISL)	1	0	0	1
20	Finland (FIN)	0	3	3	6
21	Zimbabwe (ZIM)	0	2	3	5
22	Belgium (BEL)	0	1	5	6
23	Czechoslovakia (TCH)	0	1	1	2
23	Switzerland (SUI)	0	1	1	2
25	Egypt (EGY)	0	1	0	1
26	Denmark (DEN)	0	0	3	3
26	Japan (JPN)	0	0	3	3
28	Bahamas (BAH)	0	0	1	1
Totals (28 entries)		193	175	158	526

=== Participating nations ===
- Argentina (5)
- Australia (11)
- Austria (9)
- Bahamas (2)
- Belgium (12)
- Brazil (1)
- Canada (31)
- Colombia (2)
- Czechoslovakia (2)
- Denmark (15)
- Egypt (8)
- Finland (8)
- France (28)
- Great Britain (22)
- Hong Kong (3)
- Iceland (5)
- Indonesia (3)
- Ireland (1)
- Israel (8)
- Italy (2)
- Jamaica (4)
- Japan (6)
- Luxembourg (2)
- Mexico (15)
- Netherlands (38)
- New Zealand (6)
- Norway (14)
- Poland (29)
- Spain (10)
- Sudan (2)
- Sweden (31)
- Switzerland (9)
- United States (45)
- West Germany (44)
- Yugoslavia (5)
- Zimbabwe (3)

== Medal summary ==
=== Men's events ===
Event	Gold	Silver	Bronze
25 m backstroke 1A	Mike Kenny; Great Britain	Pekka Kantola; Finland	Gary Birch; Canada
25 m backstroke 1B	Karen Liljedal; Sweden	Goran Eriksson; Sweden	Mark Burger; Canada
25 m backstroke 1C	Zbigniew Smyk; Poland	Peter Hill; Australia	Robert Ockvirk; United States
25 m breaststroke 1A	Mike Kenny; Great Britain	H. Tietze; West Germany	Pekka Kantola; Finland
25 m breaststroke 1B	Mark Burger; Canada	G. Slupe; United States	Fr. Procatus; Belgium
25 m breaststroke 1C	Zbigniew Smyk; Poland	Peter Hill; Australia	Siegmar Henker; West Germany
25 m butterfly 2	Andrzej Surala; Poland	Assaf Agmon; Israel	Yoshio Tsunoda; Japan
25 m butterfly 3	Arkadiusz Pawlowski; Poland	Miroslaw Owczarek; Poland	Francisco Flores; Spain
25 m butterfly 4	Scott Robeson; United States	Anders Olsson; Sweden	H. Vrieling; Netherlands
25 m freestyle 1A	Mike Kenny; Great Britain	Pekka Kantola; Finland	H. Tietze; West Germany
25 m freestyle 1B	Mark Burger; Canada	G. Slupe; United States	Eero Maki; Finland
25 m freestyle 1C	Zbigniew Smyk; Poland	Manfred Emmel; West Germany	Robert Ockvirk; United States
50 m backstroke 2	Andrzej Surala; Poland	Januariusz Malyska; Poland	Pascal Cornelis; Belgium
50 m backstroke 3	Miroslaw Owczarek; Poland	Henry Delgadallio; Mexico	Andrew James Scott; Zimbabwe
50 m backstroke CP C	C. Schuivens; Netherlands	Goran Forsman; Sweden	Kare Adler; Norway
50 m backstroke E1	Andrzej Wojciechowski; Poland	Roko Mikelin; Yugoslavia	Jorn Nielsen; Denmark
50 m backstroke F	Karl Schroeder; West Germany	Baruch Peretzman; Israel	Shoji Inoshita; Japan
50 m backstroke F1	B. Perry; France	R. Scharmentke; West Germany	Andreas Brand; West Germany
50 m backstroke J	Frits Hildebrandt; Netherlands	Charlie Tapscott; Australia	Johan Zegers; Netherlands
50 m breaststroke 2	Andrzej Surala; Poland	Januariusz Malyska; Poland	Assaf Agmon; Israel
50 m breaststroke 3	Miroslaw Owczarek; Poland	Joseph Wanger; Israel	Arkadiusz Pawlowski; Poland
50 m breaststroke CP C	Goran Forsman; Sweden	Kare Adler; Norway	C. Schuivens; Netherlands
50 m breaststroke E1	Andrzej Wojciechowski; Poland	K. Kampka; West Germany	Roko Mikelin; Yugoslavia
50 m breaststroke F	Baruch Peretzman; Israel	Heikki Miettinen; Finland	K. Petereit; West Germany
50 m breaststroke F1	R. Scharmentke; West Germany	Andreas Brand; West Germany	B. Perry; France
50 m breaststroke J	Gerrie de Hoop; Netherlands	Tom Nordtvedt; Norway	Johan Zegers; Netherlands
50 m butterfly 5	Eugenio Jimenez; Spain	Ryszard Machowczyk; Poland	H. G. Heynen; Netherlands
50 m freestyle 2	Andrzej Surala; Poland	Assaf Agmon; Israel	Pascal Cornelis; Belgium
50 m freestyle 3	Miroslaw Owczarek; Poland	Arkadiusz Pawlowski; Poland	Francisco Flores; Spain
50 m freestyle CP C	Kare Adler; Norway	Goran Forsman; Sweden	C. Schuivens; Netherlands
50 m freestyle E1	Andrzej Wojciechowski; Poland	Roko Mikelin; Yugoslavia	Vangel Zabev; Yugoslavia
50 m freestyle F	Karl Schroeder; West Germany	Baruch Peretzman; Israel	Shoji Inoshita; Japan
50 m freestyle J	Frits Hildebrandt; Netherlands	Charlie Tapscott; Australia	Gerrie de Hoop; Netherlands
100 m backstroke 4	Scott Robeson; United States	Adam Pielak; Poland	Jeff Stanfield; Canada
100 m backstroke 5	Ryszard Machowczyk; Poland	Eugenio Jimenez; Spain	Tore Nilsson; Sweden
100 m backstroke 6	H. J. M. Legebeke; Netherlands	G. Gattinger; West Germany	Antonio Castillo; Mexico
100 m backstroke A	James Muirhead; Great Britain	Frank Skaret; Sweden	Scott Hegle; United States
100 m backstroke B	Petter Fielding; Sweden	Dean Winger; United States	Steve Wilson; United States
100 m backstroke C-D	G. Collins-Simpson; Canada	Gary Gudgeon; Australia	Pedro Mejía; Colombia
100 m backstroke C1-D1	Denis Lapalme; Canada	Erling Trondsen; Norway	Willem van Laar; Netherlands
100 m backstroke CP D	C. de Groen; Netherlands	Chris Hampshire; Great Britain	Regis Mettraux; Switzerland
100 m backstroke E	M. Kers; Netherlands	Andre van Buiten; Netherlands	B. Koopman; Netherlands
100 m breaststroke 4	D. P. Chambers; New Zealand	Jeff Stanfield; Canada	Anders Olsson; Sweden
100 m breaststroke 5	Tore Nilsson; Sweden	Ryszard Machowczyk; Poland	G. Betega; France
100 m breaststroke 6	Andrzej Blauciak; Poland	H. J. M. Legebeke; Netherlands	B. Jaillet; France
100 m breaststroke A	Timothy McIsaac; Canada	Hakan Karlsson; Sweden	Jeff Wheatley; United States
100 m breaststroke B	Steve Wilson; United States	Dean Winger; United States	Sixten Berner; Sweden
100 m breaststroke C	Grzegorz Biela; Poland	Ron Bolotin; Israel	Sven Eryd; Sweden
100 m breaststroke C1	Erling Trondsen; Norway	Denis Lapalme; Canada	Wieslaw Chorzepa; Poland
100 m breaststroke CP D	J. van Dalen; Netherlands	Robert Jernberg; Sweden	Stig Osland; Norway
100 m breaststroke D	Pedro Mejía; Colombia	Larry Gardner; Canada	W. Wecker; West Germany
100 m breaststroke D1	Jozef Banfi; Yugoslavia	J. Finch; United States	Wolfgang Goris; West Germany
100 m breaststroke E	M. Kers; Netherlands	Andre van Buiten; Netherlands	Janusz Kozak; Poland
100 m butterfly 6	Uri Bergman; Israel	G. Gattinger; West Germany	B. Jaillet; France
100 m butterfly A	Timothy McIsaac; Canada	James Muirhead; Great Britain	Scott Hegle; United States
100 m butterfly B	Dean Winger; United States	Petter Fielding; Sweden	Steve Wilson; United States
100 m butterfly C	Ron Bolotin; Israel	G. Collins-Simpson; Canada	Grzegorz Biela; Poland
100 m butterfly D	Peter Aldous; Great Britain	Roman Gronsky; Czechoslovakia	Larry Gardner; Canada
100 m butterfly E	Andre van Buiten; Netherlands	Janusz Kozak; Poland	G. Schweitzer; West Germany
100 m freestyle 4	Anders Olsson; Sweden	Shlomo Pinto; Israel	Scott Robeson; United States
100 m freestyle 5	H. G. Heynen; Netherlands	Lars-Gunnar Andersson; Sweden	Th. Godineau; France
100 m freestyle 6	Uri Bergman; Israel	Naser Eldin Nabil; Egypt	G. Gattinger; West Germany
100 m freestyle A	James Muirhead; Great Britain	Timothy McIsaac; Canada	Scott Hegle; United States
100 m freestyle B	Dean Winger; United States	Steve Wilson; United States	Petter Fielding; Sweden
100 m freestyle C-D	Ron Bolotin; Israel	Sven Eryd; Sweden	Gary Gudgeon; Australia
100 m freestyle C1-D1	Willem van Laar; Netherlands	Erling Trondsen; Norway	Denis Lapalme; Canada
100 m freestyle CP D	C. de Groen; Netherlands	Stig Osland; Norway	Robert Jernberg; Sweden
100 m freestyle E	M. Kers; Netherlands	B. Koopman; Netherlands	Janusz Kozak; Poland
400 m freestyle C-D	Gary Gudgeon; Australia	Grzegorz Biela; Poland	Ron Bolotin; Israel
2x25 m individual medley F1	B. Perry; France	Andreas Brand; West Germany	David Foppolo; France
3x25 m individual medley 2	Andrzej Surala; Poland	Januariusz Malyska; Poland	Assaf Agmon; Israel
3x50 m individual medley C1	Erling Trondsen; Norway	Willem van Laar; Netherlands	Wieslaw Chorzepa; Poland
3x50 m individual medley D1	Jozef Banfi; Yugoslavia	Wolfgang Goris; West Germany	J. T. M. Bakx; Netherlands
3x50 m individual medley E1	Andrzej Wojciechowski; Poland	Roko Mikelin; Yugoslavia	Vangel Zabev; Yugoslavia
3x50 m individual medley F	Karl Schroeder; West Germany	Baruch Peretzman; Israel	K. Petereit; West Germany
4x25 m individual medley 3	Arkadiusz Pawlowski; Poland	Miroslaw Owczarek; Poland	Francisco Flores; Spain
4x50 m individual medley 4	Scott Robeson; United States	Anders Olsson; Sweden	Lars Olsson; Sweden
4x50 m individual medley 5	Ryszard Machowczyk; Poland	Lars-Gunnar Andersson; Sweden	Eugenio Jimenez; Spain
4x50 m individual medley 6	Uri Bergman; Israel	G. Gattiner; West Germany	Zbigniew Sajkiewicz; Poland
4x50 m individual medley A	Timothy McIsaac; Canada	Scott Hegle; United States	Hakan Karlsson; Sweden
4x50 m individual medley B	Dean Winger; United States	Petter Fielding; Sweden	Sixten Berner; Sweden
4x50 m individual medley C	G. Collins-Simpson; Canada	Gary Gudgeon; Australia	Grzegorz Biela; Poland
4x50 m individual medley D	Gerard van Vliet; Netherlands	Kurt Paetzold; Switzerland	Roman Gronsky; Czechoslovakia
4x50 m individual medley E	M. Kers; Netherlands	Andre van Buiten; Netherlands	Janusz Kozak; Poland
4 × 100 m individual medley A	Timothy McIsaac; Canada	James Muirhead; Great Britain	Jeff Wheatley; United States
4 × 100 m individual medley B	Steve Wilson; United States	Sixten Berner; Sweden	Lee Grenon; Canada
3x25 m freestyle relay 1A-1C	West Germany (FRG); Manfred Emmel; Siegmar Henker; H. Tietze	United States (USA); Robert Ockvirk; G. Slupe; D. Wallen	Canada (CAN); Gary Birch; Mark Burger; T. Parker
3x50 m freestyle relay E-F	West Germany (FRG)	None	None
3x50 m freestyle relay E1-F1	West Germany (FRG)	France (FRA)	None
3x50 m medley relay 2-4	Poland (POL): Marek Węgrzyn; Arkadiusz Pawłowski; Andrzej Surała	Israel (ISR)	New Zealand (NZL)
3x100 m freestyle relay C1-D1	Netherlands (NED)	None	None
3x100 m medley relay CP D	Netherlands (NED)	France (FRA)	Belgium (BEL)
4x50 m freestyle relay 2-6	Israel (ISR)	Poland (POL): Adam Pielak; Andrzej Blauciak; Stanisław Machowczyk; Andrzej Pawłowski	United States (USA)
4 × 100 m freestyle relay A-B	United States (USA)	Sweden (SWE)	Canada (CAN)
4 × 100 m freestyle relay C-D	West Germany (FRG)	Great Britain (GBR)	None
4 × 100 m medley relay 1A-6	Sweden (SWE)	Poland (POL): Andrzej Surała; Stanisław Machowczyk; Marek Szpojnarowicz; Adam Pielak	France (FRA)
4 × 100 m medley relay A-B	United States (USA)	Sweden (SWE)	Canada (CAN)
4 × 100 m medley relay C	Great Britain (GBR)	None	None
4 × 100 m medley relay D	West Germany (FRG)	None	None

=== Women's events ===
Event	Gold	Silver	Bronze
25 m backstroke 1A	Karen Donaldson; United States	Josefina Cornejo; Mexico	Eugenia Garcia; Argentina
25 m backstroke 1B	Martha Sandoval; Mexico	Monica Lopez; Argentina	Eileen Robertson; Zimbabwe
25 m backstroke 1C	Isabel Barr; Great Britain	Kerstin Eriksson; Sweden	None
25 m breaststroke 1A	Eugenia Garcia; Argentina	Sandra James; Zimbabwe	None
25 m breaststroke 1B	Monica Lopez; Argentina	Eileen Robertson; Zimbabwe	B. Baum; United States
25 m breaststroke 1C	Isabel Barr; Great Britain	None	None
25 m butterfly 2	D. Weber; West Germany	Syd Jacobs; United States	Malgorzata Kopec; Poland
25 m butterfly 3	Monika Lundborg; Sweden	Marcella Rizzotto; Argentina	Malgorzata Adamik; Poland
25 m butterfly 4	G. Ignaczuk; Poland	Teresa Herreras; Spain	Irene Wownuk; Canada
25 m freestyle 1A	Karen Donaldson; United States	Josefina Cornejo; Mexico	Eugenia Garcia; Argentina
25 m freestyle 1B	Martha Sandoval; Mexico	Monica Lopez; Argentina	Eileen Robertson; Zimbabwe
25 m freestyle 1C	Isabel Barr; Great Britain	Kerstin Eriksson; Sweden	None
50 m backstroke 2	M. Price; Great Britain	D. Weber; West Germany	Malgorzata Kopec; Poland
50 m backstroke 3	Malgorzata Adamik; Poland	Nella McPherson; Jamaica	Marcella Rizzotto; Argentina
50 m backstroke CP C	M. van der Meer; Netherlands	E. Lauwers; Belgium	Dorthe Bach; Denmark
50 m backstroke F	M. H. Allard; France	Marjorie Seargeant; Canada	None
50 m backstroke F1	U. Sievert; West Germany	None	None
50 m backstroke J	Josee Lake; Canada	J. van den Zaag; Netherlands	Carina Essberg; Sweden
50 m breaststroke 2	Margit Quell; West Germany	D. Weber; West Germany	M. Price; Great Britain
50 m breaststroke 3	Marcella Rizzotto; Argentina	Nella McPherson; Jamaica	Monika Lundborg; Sweden
50 m breaststroke CP C	Eva Lundkvist; Sweden	M. van der Meer; Netherlands	Dorthe Bach; Denmark
50 m breaststroke E1	S. Karlsdottir; Iceland	None	None
50 m breaststroke F	Marjorie Seargeant; Canada	M. H. Allard; France	None
50 m breaststroke F1	Petra Schad; West Germany	U. Sievert; West Germany	None
50 m breaststroke J	Josee Lake; Canada	Jolande van de Zaag; Netherlands	None
50 m butterfly 5	C. Swanepoel; West Germany	L. Wilkinson; Great Britain	Malgorzata Kozlowska; Poland
50 m freestyle 2	M. Price; Great Britain	D. Weber; West Germany	Irena Rusewicz; Poland
50 m freestyle 3	Marcella Rizzotto; Argentina	Monika Lundborg; Sweden	D. Smith; Great Britain
50 m freestyle CP C	M. van der Meer; Netherlands	Eva Lundkvist; Sweden	E. Lauwers; Belgium
50 m freestyle F	Marjorie Seargeant; Canada	M. H. Allard; France	None
50 m freestyle J	Josee Lake; Canada	J. van den Zaag; Netherlands	Carina Essberg; Sweden
100 m backstroke 4	G. Ignaczuk; Poland	Teresa Herreras; Spain	C. Salden; Netherlands
100 m backstroke 5	C. Swanepoel; West Germany	Malgorzata Kozlowska; Poland	L. Wilkinson; Great Britain
100 m backstroke 6	Agnieszka Ogorzelska; Poland	Pilar Javaloyas; Spain	None
100 m backstroke A	Yvette Michel; Canada	Susan Card; United States	Andrea Rossi; Canada
100 m backstroke B	Trischa Zorn; United States	Marie van Liere; United States	Missy Akins; United States
100 m backstroke C-D	Jackie Mitchell; Canada	Monica Vaughan; Great Britain	Helen Ronnegard; Sweden
100 m backstroke C1-D1	Ewa Dudka; Poland	Mirjam Sanders; Netherlands	Maj Britt Mastad; Norway
100 m backstroke CP D	Ineke Hageraats; Netherlands	W. Poortvliet; Netherlands	Gayle Ginnish; United States
100 m backstroke E	Annelie Ahrenstrand; Sweden	Anna Korniewicz; Poland	Isabelle Duranceau; France
100 m breaststroke 4	G. Ignaczuk; Poland	Teresa Herreras; Spain	Jenny Orpwood; Great Britain
100 m breaststroke 5	C. Swanepoel; West Germany	Malgorzata Kozlowska; Poland	L. Wilkinson; Great Britain
100 m breaststroke 6	Agnieszka Ogorzelska; Poland	Pilar Javaloyas; Spain	None
100 m breaststroke A	Yvette Michel; Canada	Lorraine Robinson; Great Britain	M. Huyben; Netherlands
100 m breaststroke B	Missy Akins; United States	Lisa Bentz; Canada	J. Tree; Great Britain
100 m breaststroke C	Cheryl Kristiansen; Canada	None	None
100 m breaststroke C1	Lucyna Krajewska; Poland	Mirjam Sanders; Netherlands	Ewa Dudka; Poland
100 m breaststroke CP D	Ineke Hageraats; Netherlands	Inger Johanne Martinsen; Norway	Vibeke Hagen; Norway
100 m breaststroke D	Monica Vaughan; Great Britain	Jackie Mitchell; Canada	Jan Wilson; United States
100 m breaststroke D1	Sarah Newland; Jamaica	Maj Britt Mastad; Norway	Bozena Czopek; Poland
100 m breaststroke E	Annelie Ahrenstrand; Sweden	Anna Korniewicz; Poland	Isabelle Duranceau; France
100 m butterfly 6	Agnieszka Ogorzelska; Poland	Pilar Javaloyas; Spain	None
100 m butterfly A	Andrea Rossi; Canada	Carolyn Connors; Australia	Sandy Dunne; United States
100 m butterfly B	Trischa Zorn; United States	Missy Akins; United States	Eva Andersson; Sweden
100 m butterfly C	Cheryl Kristiansen; Canada	None	None
100 m butterfly D	Monica Vaughan; Great Britain	Margaret Nicholson; Canada	Krystyna Sikorska; Poland
100 m butterfly E	Annelie Ahrenstrand; Sweden	Isabelle Duranceau; France	Silvia Cornelissen; Netherlands
100 m freestyle 4	G. Ignaczuk; Poland	Monika Lindstrom; Sweden	Teresa Herreras; Spain
100 m freestyle 5	C. Swanepoel; West Germany	L. Wilkinson; Great Britain	Malgorzata Kozlowska; Poland
100 m freestyle 6	Agnieszka Ogorzelska; Poland	Pilar Javaloyas; Spain	Christine Morgan; Bahamas
100 m freestyle A	Yvette Michel; Canada	Carolyn Connors; Australia	Gunilla Moline; Sweden
100 m freestyle B	Trischa Zorn; United States	Eva Andersson; Sweden	Missy Akins; United States
100 m freestyle C-D	Monica Vaughan; Great Britain	Jackie Mitchell; Canada	Karen Gesierich; West Germany
100 m freestyle C1-D1	Lucyna Krajewska; Poland	Mirjam Sanders; Netherlands	Sarah Baker; Canada
100 m freestyle CP D	Ineke Hageraats; Netherlands	Inger Johanne Martinsen; Norway	W. Poortvliet; Netherlands
100 m freestyle E	Annelie Ahrenstrand; Sweden	Isabelle Duranceau; France	F. Spivey; United States
400 m freestyle C-D	Helen Ronnegard; Sweden	Jackie Mitchell; Canada	Margaret Nicholson; Canada
2x50 m individual medley F1	Petra Schad; West Germany	U. Sievert; West Germany	None
3x25 m individual medley 2	M. Price; Great Britain	D. Weber; West Germany	Irena Rusewicz; Poland
3x50 m individual medley C1	Lucyna Krajewska; Poland	Mirjam Sanders; Netherlands	Ewa Dudka; Poland
3x50 m individual medley D1	Maj Britt Mastad; Norway	Sarah Newland; Jamaica	Bozena Czopek; Poland
3x50 m individual medley F	M. H. Allard; France	None	None
4x25 m individual medley 3	Monika Lundborg; Sweden	D. Smith; Great Britain	Malgorzata Adamik; Poland
4x50 m individual medley 4	G. Ignaczuk; Poland	Teresa Herreras; Spain	M. Crespeau; France
4x50 m individual medley 5	C. Swanepoel; West Germany	Malgorzata Kozlowska; Poland	L. Wilkinson; Great Britain
4x50 m individual medley 6	Agnieszka Ogorzelska; Poland	Pilar Javaloyas; Spain	None
4x50 m individual medley A	Yvette Michel; Canada	Andrea Rossi; Canada	Carolyn Connors; Australia
4x50 m individual medley B	Trischa Zorn; United States	Missy Akins; United States	Marie van Liere; United States
4x50 m individual medley C	Cheryl Kristiansen; Canada	None	None
4x50 m individual medley D	Monica Vaughan; Great Britain	Jackie Mitchell; Canada	Britt-Marie Samuelsson; Sweden
4x50 m individual medley E	Annelie Ahrenstrand; Sweden	Isabelle Duranceau; France	Anna Korniewicz; Poland
4 × 100 m individual medley A	Kim Kilpatrick; Canada	None	None
4 × 100 m individual medley B	Trischa Zorn; United States	Marie van Liere; United States	Eva Andersson; Sweden
3x25 m freestyle relay 1A-1C	United States (USA); Karen Donaldson; Sharon Myers; C. Patton	Argentina (ARG); Eugenia Garcia; Monica Lopez; Susana Masciotra	None
3x50 m medley relay 2-4	Poland (POL)	Great Britain (GBR)	United States (USA)
3x50 m medley relay CP C	None	None	None
3x100 m freestyle relay C1-D1	Poland (POL)	None	None
3x100 m medley relay CP D	Netherlands (NED)	United States (USA)	France (FRA)
4x50 m freestyle relay 2-6	Great Britain (GBR)	Poland (POL)	None
4 × 100 m freestyle relay A-B	United States (USA)	Canada (CAN)	West Germany (FRG)
4 × 100 m freestyle relay C-D	Canada (CAN)	None	None
4 × 100 m medley relay 1A-6	Poland (POL)	Netherlands (NED)	Spain (ESP)
4 × 100 m medley relay A-B	United States (USA)	Canada (CAN)	None
