= Archery at the 1960 Summer Paralympics – Women's Windsor round open =

Women's Windsor round open at the I Paralympic Games
- Paralympic Archery
- Competitors: 3 from 2 nations

Medalists
1st place, gold medalist(s)		Margaret Harriman	Rhodesia
2nd place, silver medalist(s)		Robin Irvine	Great Britain
3rd place, bronze medalist(s)		Kathleen Comley	Great Britain

The Women's Windsor round open was one of the events held in archery at the 1960 Summer Paralympics in Rome.

There were only three competitors - representing Great Britain and Rhodesia. As in the FITA round, Rhodesia's Margaret Harriman won a clear victory over British archers Irvine and Comley (full names not recorded).

Rank	Athlete	Score
1st place, gold medalist(s)	Margaret Harriman (RHO)	726
2nd place, silver medalist(s)	Robin Irvine (GBR)	533
3rd place, bronze medalist(s)	Kathleen Comley (GBR)	468
