= Takudzwa =

Takudzwa is a name of Zimbabwean origin.

== List of people with the name ==
- Takudzwa Chimwemwe, Zimbabwean footballer
- Takudzwa Gwariro, Zimbabwean rower
- Takudzwa Maidza, Zimbabwean-born Australian singer-songwriter and rapper
- Takudzwa Ngadziore, Zimbabwean politician
- Takudzwa Ngwenya, Zimbabwean rugby player
