= Zimbabwe at the 2012 Summer Paralympics =

- IPC code: ZIM
- NPC: Zimbabwe National Paralympic Committee

in London
- Competitors: 2 in 2 sports
- Medals: Gold 0 Silver 0 Bronze 0 Total 0

Summer Paralympics appearances (overview)
- 1960; 1964; 1968; 1972; 1976; 1980; 1984; 1988–1992; 1996; 2000; 2004; 2008; 2012; 2016; 2020; 2024

Zimbabwe competed at the 2012 Summer Paralympics in London, United Kingdom from August 29 to September 9, 2012.

== Athletics ==
Men's track

Athlete	Event	Heat		Final	
Athlete	Event	Result	Rank	Result	Rank
Elliot Mujaji	100m T46	13.12	5	did not advance	

== Wheelchair Tennis ==
Athlete	Event	Round of 64	Round of 32	Round of 16	Quarterfinals	Semifinals	Final	
Athlete	Event	Opposition Result	Opposition Result	Opposition Result	Opposition Result	Opposition Result	Opposition Result	Rank
Nyasha Mharakurwa	Men's Singles	Avanthey (SUI); W 6–4, 6-3	Kunieda (JPN); L 0–6, 0-6	did not advance				

== See also ==
- Zimbabwe at the Paralympics
- Zimbabwe at the 2012 Summer Olympics
