= 2016 Summer Paralympics Parade of Nations =

Opening Ceremony in Rio de Janeiro

During the Parade of Nations at the opening ceremony of the 2016 Summer Paralympics, athletes from each participating country paraded in the Maracanã Stadium, preceded by its flag and placard barrier. Each flag bearer had been chosen either by the nation's National Paralympic Committee or by the athletes themselves.

== Parade order ==
The refugee team entered first as Independent Paralympic Athletes, while the host country, Brazil, entered last. All nations in between entered in alphabetical order in Brazilian Portuguese.

== Countries and flag bearers ==
The following is a list of all parading countries with their respective flag bearer, sorted in the order they appeared in the parade. This is sortable by country name under which they entered, the flag bearer's name, or the flag bearer's sport. Names are given as were officially designated by the IPC.

Order	Nation	Brazilian Portuguese name	Flag bearer	Sport
1	Independent Paralympic Athletes (IPA)	Atletas Paralímpicos Independentes	Ibrahim Al Hussein	Swimming
2	Afghanistan (AFG)	Afeganistão	Naiem Durani	Athletics
3	South Africa (RSA)	África do Sul	Ntombizanele Situ	Athletics
4	Germany (GER)	Alemanha	Markus Rehm	Athletics
5	Angola (ANG)	Angola	Esperança Gicaso	Athletics
6	Saudi Arabia (KSA)	Arábia Saudita	Asaad Sharaheli	Athletics
7	Algeria (ALG)	Argélia	Madjid Djemai	Athletics
8	Argentina (ARG)	Argentina	Gustavo Fernández	Wheelchair tennis
9	Armenia (ARM)	Armênia	Greta Vardanyan	Powerlifting
10	Aruba (ARU)	Aruba	Jesús David de Marchena Acevedo	Swimming
11	Australia (AUS)	Austrália	Bradley Ness	Wheelchair basketball
12	Austria (AUT)	Áustria	Wolfgang Eibeck	Cycling
13	Azerbaijan (AZE)	Azerbaijão	Ilham Zakiyev	Judo
14	Bahrain (BRN)	Bareine	Fatema Nedham	Athletics
15	Belarus (BLR)	Belarus	Aliaksandr Tryputs	Athletics
16	Belgium (BEL)	Bélgica	Sven Decaesstecker	Swimming
17	Benin (BEN)	Benim	Cosme Akpovi	Athletics
18	Bermuda (BER)	Bermuda	Jessica Cooper Lewis	Athletics
19	Bosnia and Herzegovina (BIH)	Bósnia e Herzegovina	Dzenita Klico	Athletics
20	Botswana (BOT)	Botsuana	Keatlaretse Mabote	Athletics
21	Bulgaria (BUL)	Bulgária	Ivanka Koleva	Athletics
22	Burkina Faso (BUR)	Burkina Faso	Jacques Ouedraogo	Athletics
23	Burundi (BDI)	Burundi	Remy Nikobimeze	Athletics
24	Cape Verde (CPV)	Cabo Verde	Márcio Fernandes	Athletics
25	Cameroon (CMR)	Camarões	Christian Gobe	Athletics
26	Cambodia (CAM)	Camboja	Vun Van	Athletics
27	Canada (CAN)	Canadá	David Eng	Wheelchair basketball
28	Qatar (QAT)	Catar	Mohammed Rashid Al-Kubaisi	Athletics
29	Kazakhstan (KAZ)	Cazaquistão	Anuar Akhmetov	Swimming
30	Central African Republic (CAF)	República Centro-Africana	Roddy-Mickael Stephane Mokolongo	Athletics
31	Chile (CHI)	Chile	Juan Carlos Garrido	Powerlifting
32	China (CHN)	República Popular da China	Rong Jing	Wheelchair fencing
33	Cyprus (CYP)	Chipre	Karolina Pelendritou	Swimming
34	Colombia (COL)	Colômbia	Nelson Crispín	Swimming
35	Republic of the Congo (CGO)	Congo	Bardy Chris Bouesso	Athletics
36	Democratic Republic of the Congo (COD)	República Democrática do Congo	Rosette Luyina Kiese	Athletics
37	South Korea (KOR)	República da Coreia	Lee Ha-gel	Wheelchair tennis
38	Ivory Coast (CIV)	Costa do Marfim	Alidou Diamoutene	Powerlifting
39	Costa Rica (CRC)	Costa Rica	Leonel Solis	Cycling
40	Croatia (CRO)	Croácia	Branimir Budetić	Athletics
41	Cuba (CUB)	Cuba	Dalidaivis Rodriguez	Judo
42	Denmark (DEN)	Dinamarca	Annika Lykke Dalskov Risum	Equestrian
43	Dominican Republic (DOM)	República Dominicana	Jose Frank Rodriguez	Cycling
44	Egypt (EGY)	Egito	Metwaly Mathna	Powerlifting
45	El Salvador (ESA)	El Salvador	Herbert Aceituno	Powerlifting
46	United Arab Emirates (UAE)	Emirados Árabes Unidos	Mohamed Al-Hammadi	Athletics
47	Ecuador (ECU)	Equador	Poleth Isamar Mendes Sanchez	Athletics
48	Slovakia (SVK)	Eslováquia	Jan Riapos	Table tennis
49	Slovenia (SLO)	Eslovênia	Gorazd Francek Tirsek	Shooting
50	Spain (ESP)	Espanha	José Manuel Ruiz Reyes	Table tennis
51	United States (USA)	Estados Unidos da América	Allison Jones	Cycling
52	Estonia (EST)	Estônia	Sirly Tiik	Athletics
53	Ethiopia (ETH)	Etiópia	Tamiru Demisse	Athletics
54	Macedonia (MKD)	Ex-República Iugoslava da Macedônia	Olivera Nakovska-Bikova	Shooting
55	Faroe Islands (FRO)	Ilhas Feroé	Krista Mørkøre	Swimming
56	Fiji (FIJ)	Fiji	Merewalesi Roden	Table tennis
57	Philippines (PHI)	Filipinas	Josephine Medina	Table tennis
58	Finland (FIN)	Finlândia	Katja Karjalainen	Equestrian
59	France (FRA)	França	Michaël Jeremiasz	Wheelchair tennis
60	Gabon (GAB)	Gabão	Edmond Ngombi	Athletics
61	The Gambia (GAM)	Gâmbia	Jarju Demba	Athletics
62	Ghana (GHA)	Gana	Yusif Amadu	Athletics
63	Georgia (GEO)	Geórgia	Zviad Gogotchuri	Judo
64	Great Britain (GBR)	Grã-Bretanha	Lee Pearson	Equestrian
65	Greece (GRE)	Grécia	Grigorios Polychronidis	Boccia
66	Guatemala (GUA)	Guatemala	Oscar Raxon Siquiej	Athletics
67	Guinea (GUI)	Guiné	Mohamed Sanoussy Camara	Athletics
68	Guinea-Bissau (GBS)	Guiné-Bissau	Cesar Lopes Cardoso	Athletics
69	Haiti (HAI)	Haiti	Jean Indris Santerre	Athletics
70	Honduras (HON)	Honduras	Emmanuel Diaz	Swimming
71	Hong Kong (HKG)	Hong Kong, China	Yu Chui Yee	Wheelchair fencing
72	Hungary (HUN)	Hungria	Gitta Raczko	Swimming
73	India (IND)	Índia	Devendra Jhajharia	Athletics
74	Indonesia (INA)	Indonésia	Agus Ngaimin	Swimming
75	Iran (IRI)	República Islâmica do Irã	Eshrat Kordestani	Sitting volleyball
76	Iraq (IRQ)	Iraque	Rasool Mohsin	Powerlifting
77	Ireland (IRL)	Irlanda	John Twomey	Sailing
78	Iceland (ISL)	Islândia	Jon Margeir Sverrisson	Swimming
79	Israel (ISR)	Israel	Shraga Weinberg	Wheelchair tennis
80	Italy (ITA)	Itália	Martina Caironi	Athletics
81	Jamaica (JAM)	Jamaica	Shane Hudson	Athletics
82	Japan (JPN)	Japão	Yui Kamiji	Wheelchair tennis
83	Jordan (JOR)	Jordânia	Khetam Abuawad	Table tennis
84	Kuwait (KUW)	Kuwait	Hamad Aladwani	Athletics
85	Laos (LAO)	República Popular Democrática do Laos	Pia Pia	Powerlifting
86	Lesotho (LES)	Lesoto	Litsitso Khotlele	Athletics
87	Latvia (LAT)	Letônia	Diana Dadzite	Athletics
88	Libya (LBA)	Líbia	Ghazalah Alaqouri	Powerlifting
89	Lithuania (LTU)	Lituânia	Edgaras Matakas	Swimming
90	Luxembourg (LUX)	Luxemburgo	Joel Wagener	Cycling
91	Macau (MAC)	Macau, China	Chen Yu Chia	Swimming
92	Madagascar (MAD)	Madagascar	Revelinot Raherinandrasana	Athletics
93	Malaysia (MAS)	Malásia	Abdul Latif Romly	Athletics
94	Malawi (MAW)	Maláui	Taonere Banda	Athletics
95	Mali (MLI)	Mali	Oumar Sidibe	Athletics
96	Malta (MLT)	Malta	Vladyslava Kravchenko	Swimming
97	Morocco (MAR)	Marrocos	Azeddine Nouiri	Athletics
98	Mauritius (MRI)	Maurício	Scody Victor	Swimming
99	Mexico (MEX)	México	Nely Miranda	Athletics
100	Mozambique (MOZ)	Moçambique	Edmilsa Governo	Athletics
101	Moldova (MDA)	República da Moldova	Larisa Marinenkova	Powerlifting
102	Mongolia (MGL)	Mongólia	Dambadondogiin Baatarjav	Archery
103	Montenegro (MNE)	Montenegro	Ilija Tadić	Swimming
104	Myanmar (MYA)	Myanmar	Aung Myint Myat	Swimming
105	Namibia (NAM)	Namíbia	Johanna Benson	Athletics
106	Nepal (NEP)	Nepal	Bikram Rana	Athletics
107	Nicaragua (NCA)	Nicarágua	Gabriel de Jesus Cuadra Holmann	Athletics
108	Niger (NIG)	Níger	Ibrahim Dayabou	Athletics
109	Nigeria (NGR)	Nigéria	Lucy Ejike	Powerlifting
110	Norway (NOR)	Noruega	Bjornar Erikstad	Sailing
111	New Zealand (NZL)	Nova Zelândia	Holly Robinson	Athletics
112	Oman (OMA)	Omã	Raya Al'abri	Athletics
113	Netherlands (NED)	Países Baixos	Marlou van Rhijn	Athletics
114	Palestine (PLE)	Palestina	Husam Azzam	Athletics
115	Panama (PAN)	Panamá	Francisco Cedeno Almengor	Athletics
116	Papua New Guinea (PNG)	Papua Nova Guiné	Joyleen Jeffrey	Athletics
117	Pakistan (PAK)	Paquistão	Haider Ali	Shooting
118	Peru (PER)	Peru	Israel Hilario Rimas	Cycling
119	Poland (POL)	Polônia	Rafał Wilk	Cycling
120	Puerto Rico (PUR)	Porto Rico	Paola Alexandra Acuna Sanchez	Swimming
121	Portugal (POR)	Portugal	José Carlos Macedo	Boccia
122	Kenya (KEN)	Quênia	Henry Kirwa	Athletics
123	Kyrgyzstan (KGZ)	Quirguistão	Zhyrgalbek Orosbaev	Powerlifting
124	North Korea (PRK)	República Popular Democrática da Coreia	Song Kum-jong	Athletics
125	Romania (ROU)	Romênia	Carol-Eduard Novak	Cycling
126	Rwanda (RWA)	Ruanda	Hermas Muvunyi	Athletics
127	Samoa (SAM)	Samoa	Maggie Aiono	Athletics
128	São Tomé and Príncipe (STP)	São Tomé e Príncipe	Alex Anjos	Athletics
129	Seychelles (SEY)	Seicheles	Cyril Charles	Athletics
130	Senegal (SEN)	Senegal	Youssoupha Diouf	Wrestling
131	Sierra Leone (SLE)	Serra Leoa	George Wyndham	Table tennis
132	Serbia (SRB)	Sérvia	Borislava Perić-Ranković	Table tennis
133	Singapore (SIN)	Singapura	Yip Pin Xiu	Swimming
134	Syria (SYR)	República Árabe da Síria	Mohamad Mohamad	Athletics
135	Somalia (SOM)	Somália	Farhan Adawe	Athletics
136	Sri Lanka (SRI)	Sri Lanka	Anil Prasanna Jayalath Yodha Pedige	Athletics
137	Sweden (SWE)	Suécia	Maja Reichard	Swimming
138	Switzerland (SUI)	Suíça	Sandra Graf	Athletics
139	Suriname (SUR)	Suriname	Biondi Misasi	Athletics
140	Tajikistan (TJK)	Tadjiquistão	Romikhudo Dodikhudoev	Athletics
141	Thailand (THA)	Tailândia	Rawat Tana	Athletics
142	Chinese Taipei (TPE)	Taipé Chinesa	Lin Tzu-hui	Powerlifting
143	Tanzania (TAN)	República Unida da Tanzânia	Ignas Mtweve	Athletics
144	Czech Republic (CZE)	República Tcheca	Jiří Ježek	Cycling
145	Timor-Leste (TLS)	República Democrática de Timor-Leste	Antonio Mendonca	Athletics
146	Togo (TOG)	Togo	Aliou Bawa	Powerlifting
147	Tonga (TGA)	Tonga	Ana Pela Talakai	Athletics
148	Trinidad and Tobago (TTO)	Trinidad e Tobago	Akeem Stewart	Athletics
149	Tunisia (TUN)	Tunísia	Hania Aidi	Athletics
150	Turkmenistan (TKM)	Turcomenistão	Sergey Meladze	Powerlifting
151	Turkey (TUR)	Turquia	Mesme Taşbağ	Judo
152	Ukraine (UKR)	Ucrânia	Margaryta Pryvalykhina	Sitting volleyball
153	Uganda (UGA)	Uganda	David Emong	Athletics
154	Uruguay (URU)	Uruguai	Henry Borges	Judo
155	Uzbekistan (UZB)	Uzbequistão	Doniyor Saliev	Athletics
156	Venezuela (VEN)	Venezuela	Sol Rojas	Athletics
157	Vietnam (VIE)	Vietnã	Nguyễn Thành Trung	Swimming
158	Virgin Islands (ISV)	Ilhas Virgens Americanas	Ivan Espinosa	Athletic
159	Zimbabwe (ZIM)	Zimbábue	Takudzwa Gwariro	Rowing
160	Brazil (BRA)	Brasil	Shirlene Coelho	Athletics

== See also ==
- 2016 Summer Olympics Parade of Nations

Preceded by London	Summer Paralympics Parade of Nations; Rio de Janeiro; XV Paralympic Summer Games (2016)	Succeeded by Tokyo
