= Zimbabwe at the 2008 Summer Paralympics =

- IPC code: ZIM
- NPC: Zimbabwe National Paralympic Committee

in Beijing
- Competitors: 2 in 1 sport
- Flag bearers: Elliot Mujaji (opening & closing)
- Medals Ranked -th: Gold 0 Silver 0 Bronze 0 Total 0

Summer Paralympics appearances (overview)
- 1960; 1964; 1968; 1972; 1976; 1980; 1984; 1988–1992; 1996; 2000; 2004; 2008; 2012; 2016; 2020; 2024

Zimbabwe competed in the 2008 Summer Paralympics in Beijing, China. The country's delegation consisted of two track and field athletes, Elliot Mujaji and Molene Muza. Mujaji is a two-time Paralympic gold medalist, having won the 100 metre T46 event in 2000 and 2004, while Muza competed in the Paralympic Games for the first time. In the days leading up to the games, the pair trained at the National University of Science and Technology in Bulawayo under coach Remigio Mumbire, however a lack of money threatened to cut the training camp short. The group planned to leave for Beijing on 28 August and arrive two days later.

Mujaji competed in the men's 100 and 200 metre races, and Muza in the women's javelin and shot put.

== Athletics ==
Men

Athlete	Class	Event	Heats		Semifinal		Final		
Athlete	Class	Event	Result	Rank	Result	Rank	Result	Points	Rank
Elliot Mujaji	T46	100 m	12.01	6	did not advance				
Elliot Mujaji	T46	200 m	23.23	2 Q	N/A		50.75	-	8

Mujaji was hit by hamstring problems during the 200 m final. He had to stop and went on to hobble across the finish line.

Women

Athlete	Class	Event	Heats		Semifinal		Final		
Athlete	Class	Event	Result	Rank	Result	Rank	Result	Points	Rank
Molene Muza	F57-58 (F58)	Shot put	N/A				6.74	693	13
Molene Muza	F57-58 (F58)	Javelin throw	N/A				23.09	783	10

== See also ==
- Zimbabwe at the 2008 Summer Olympics
