= Jackie Mitchell (swimmer) =

Canadian paralympic athlete and swimming

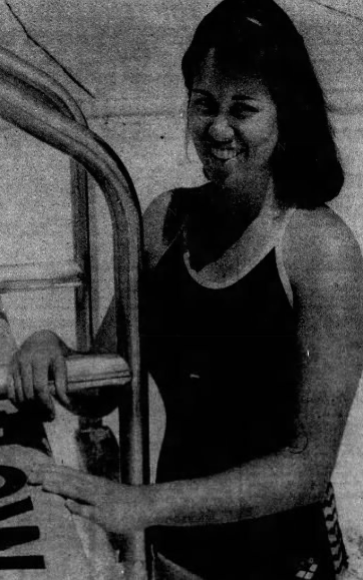
- Mitchell in 1979

Personal information
- Born: 1959 or 1960 (age 65–66)

Sport
- Country: Canada
- Sport: Para-athletics; Swimming
Medal record
Representing Canada
Paralympic Games
Swimming
Bronze medal – third place	1976 Toronto	Women's 100 m backstroke D
Silver medal – second place	1980 Arnhem	Women's 100 m breaststroke D
Gold medal – first place	1980 Arnhem	Women's 100 m backstroke C-D
Silver medal – second place	1980 Arnhem	Women's 100 m freestyle C-D
Silver medal – second place	1980 Arnhem	Women's 400 m freestyle C-D
Silver medal – second place	1980 Arnhem	Women's 4x50 m individual medley D

Jackie Mitchell (born 1959/1960) (Note: Mitchell was 16 years old in 1976) is a Canadian paralympic athlete and swimmer. She competed at the 1976 and 1980 Summer Paralympics.

== Life and career ==
Mitchell attended A. N. Myer Secondary School. (Note: Mitchell currently attended A. N. Myer Secondary School in 1978)

Mitchell competed at the 1976 Summer Paralympics, winning the bronze medal in the women's 100 m backstroke D event. She then competed at the 1980 Summer Paralympics, winning three silver medals and a gold medal in swimming.
