= Zimbabwe at the 2004 Summer Paralympics =

- IPC code: ZIM
- NPC: Zimbabwe National Paralympic Committee

in Athens
- Competitors: 2 in 1 sport
- Flag bearer: Elliot Mujaji
- Medals Ranked 57th: Gold 1 Silver 0 Bronze 0 Total 1

Summer Paralympics appearances (overview)
- 1960; 1964; 1968; 1972; 1976; 1980; 1984; 1988–1992; 1996; 2000; 2004; 2008; 2012; 2016; 2020; 2024

Zimbabwe competed at the 2004 Summer Paralympics in Athens, Greece. The team included one man and one woman. Competitors from Zimbabwe won 1 gold to finish 57th in the medal table.

== Medallists ==
Medal	Name	Sport	Event
Gold	Elliot Mujaji	Athletics	Men's 100m T46

== Sports ==
=== Athletics ===
==== Men's track ====
Athlete	Class	Event	Heats		Semifinal		Final	
Athlete	Class	Event	Result	Rank	Result	Rank	Result	Rank
Elliot Mujaji	T46	100m	11.02	1 Q	—		11.00	1st place, gold medalist(s)
Elliot Mujaji	T46	200m	22.04	1 Q	—		23.00	5

==== Women's field ====
Athlete	Class	Event	Final		
Athlete	Class	Event	Result	Points	Rank
Moline Muza	F56-58	Javelin	20.22	809	10
Moline Muza	F56-58	Shot put	7.02	767	16

== See also ==
- Zimbabwe at the Paralympics
- Zimbabwe at the 2004 Summer Olympics
