= Baruch Peretzman =

Israeli Paralympic swimmer

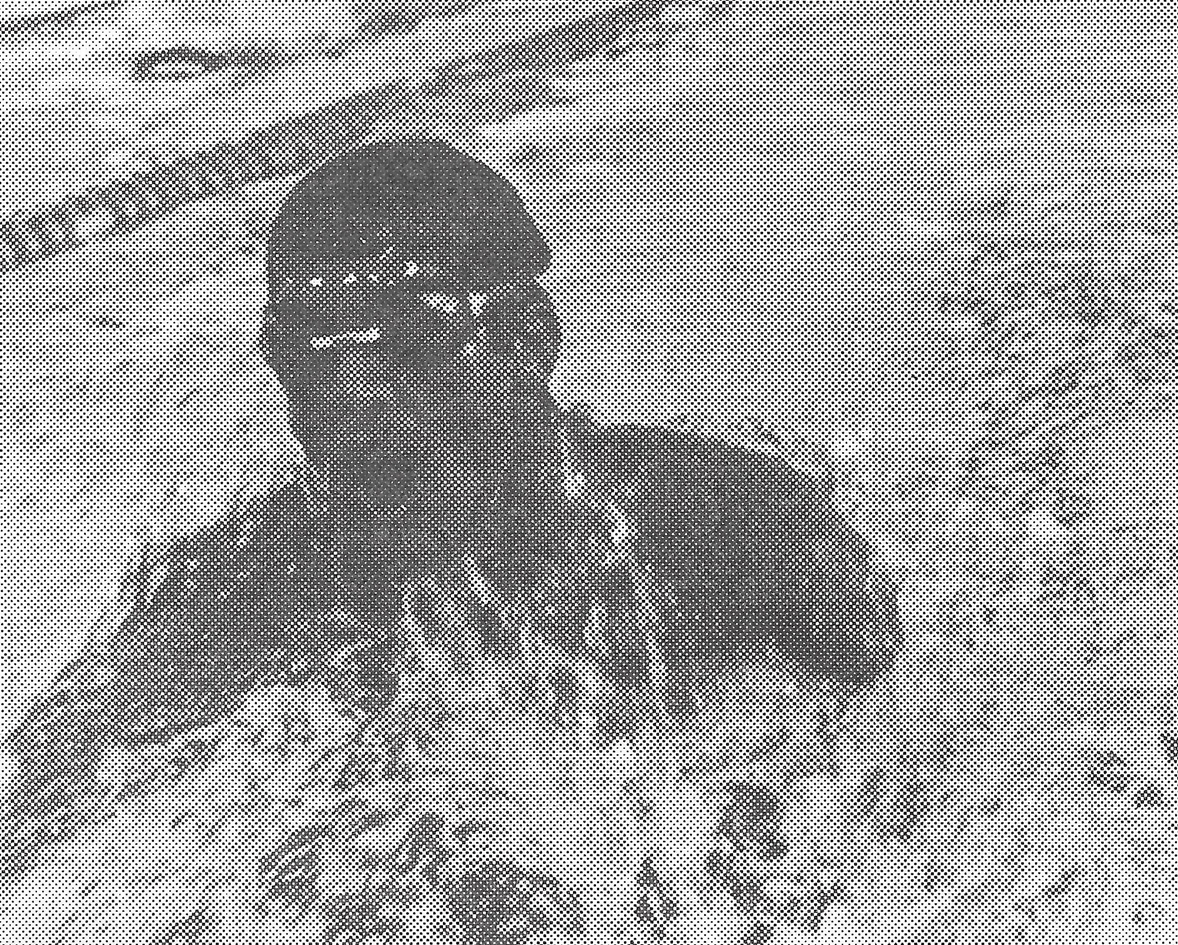
- Baruch Peretzman, 1984

Personal information
- Native name: ברוך פרצמן
- Nationality: Israel
- Born: 16 January 1951

Sport
- Sport: Swimming
Medal record
Event / 1st / 2nd / 3rd; Paralympic Games / 1 / 6 / 1
Men's para swimming
Representing Israel
Paralympic Games
Gold medal – first place	1980 Arnhem	50m breaststroke F
Silver medal – second place	1980 Arnhem	50m backstroke F
Silver medal – second place	1980 Arnhem	50m freestyle F
Silver medal – second place	1980 Arnhem	3X50m ind. medley F
Silver medal – second place	1984 Stoke Mandeville	100m backstroke A6
Silver medal – second place	1984 Stoke Mandeville	100m breaststroke A6
Silver medal – second place	1984 Stoke Mandeville	200m ind. medley A6
Bronze medal – third place	1984 Stoke Mandeville	100m freestyle A6
European Championship
Gold medal – first place	1985 Germany	50m freestyle
Silver medal – second place	1985 Germany	100m backstroke
Silver medal – second place	1985 Germany	100m breaststroke

Baruch Peretzman (Hebrew: ברוך פרצמן) is a former Israeli Paralympic swimmer.

== Biography ==
Peretzman was born in 1951 in Tzrifin and drafted to the Israel Defense Forces in 1969, serving in the special operations unit Shayetet 13. While in service in the Sinai Peninsula, in 1972 he was severely wounded by a mine of white phosphorus munitions and lost his left arm and left eye.

Peretzman represented Israel at the Summer Paralympics as a member of the swimming team in 1980, 1984 and 1988, winning one gold medal, six silver medals and one bronze medals.

He studied geography and is the head of cartography at the Survey of Israel department in the Ministry of Housing and Construction.
