= Archery at the 1960 Summer Paralympics – Women's FITA round open =

Women's FITA round open at the I Paralympic Games
- Paralympic Archery
- Competitors: 3 from 2 nations

Medalists
1st place, gold medalist(s)		Margaret Harriman	Rhodesia
2nd place, silver medalist(s)		Kathleen Comley	Great Britain
3rd place, bronze medalist(s)		Robin Irvine	Great Britain

The Women's FITA round open was one of the events held in archery at the 1960 Summer Paralympics in Rome.

There were only three competitors - representing Great Britain and Rhodesia. Rhodesia's Margaret Harriman scored 962 points to win gold with a crushing lead over her two British opponents.

Rank	Athlete	Score
1st place, gold medalist(s)	Margaret Harriman (RHO)	962
2nd place, silver medalist(s)	Kathleen Comley (GBR)	534
3rd place, bronze medalist(s)	Robin Irvine (GBR)	494
