= Zimbabwe at the 2000 Summer Paralympics =

- IPC code: ZIM
- NPC: Zimbabwe National Paralympic Committee

in Sydney
- Competitors: 3 in 1 sport
- Medals Ranked 49th: Gold 1 Silver 0 Bronze 0 Total 1

Summer Paralympics appearances (overview)
- 1960; 1964; 1968; 1972; 1976; 1980; 1984; 1988–1992; 1996; 2000; 2004; 2008; 2012; 2016; 2020; 2024

There were 1 female and 2 male athletes representing the country at the 2000 Summer Paralympics.

== Medallists ==
Medal	Name	Sport	Event
Gold	Elliot Mujaji	Athletics	Men's 100m T46

== See also ==
- Zimbabwe at the 2000 Summer Olympics
- Zimbabwe at the Paralympics

== Bibliography ==
- International Paralympic Committee (2000). "Appendix C: Athlete Numbers - By Delegation". Sydney 2000 Paralympic Games Post Games Report. Sydney.
