= Zimbabwe at the 2016 Summer Paralympics =

- IPC code: ZIM
- NPC: Zimbabwe National Paralympic Committee

in Rio de Janeiro
- Competitors: 6 in 2 sports
- Flag bearer: Takudzwa Gwariro
- Medals: Gold 0 Silver 0 Bronze 0 Total 0

Summer Paralympics appearances (overview)
- 1960; 1964; 1968; 1972; 1976; 1980; 1984; 1988–1992; 1996; 2000; 2004; 2008; 2012; 2016; 2020; 2024

Zimbabwe sent six athletes across two different sports to the 2016 Summer Paralympics in Rio de Janeiro, Brazil, from 7 September to 18 September 2016.

== Disability classifications ==
Every participant at the Paralympics has their disability grouped into one of five disability categories; amputation, the condition may be congenital or sustained through injury or illness; cerebral palsy; wheelchair athletes, there is often overlap between this and other categories; visual impairment, including blindness; Les autres, any physical disability that does not fall strictly under one of the other categories, for example dwarfism or multiple sclerosis. Each Paralympic sport then has its own classifications, dependent upon the specific physical demands of competition. Events are given a code, made of numbers and letters, describing the type of event and classification of the athletes competing. Some sports, such as athletics, divide athletes by both the category and severity of their disabilities, other sports, for example swimming, group competitors from different categories together, the only separation being based on the severity of the disability.

== Funding and support ==
Funding issues proved a major challenge for Zimbabwe's participation at the 2016 Summer Paralympics. This was in part a result of only 220,000 of the 2.5 million tickets to watch the Games in Rio being sold a month ahead of the Games. The NPC had been promised US$8,000 to cover the team's travel to Rio. Less than a month prior to the Games, they were informed they would get only US$6,000 and this money would not be delivered until after the conclusion of the Games.

== Medals ==
Zimbabwe finished the 2016 Games ranked fourth all time for total medals won by African countries, with 23 gold, 26 silver and 20 bronze medals for a total of 69 medals. They were ahead of fifth ranked Algeria who had 19 gold, 13 silver and 25 bronze medals for 57 all time. They were behind third ranked Tunisia who had 74 all time, of which 32 were gold, 28 silver and 14 bronze.

== Athletics ==
Women's Track

Athlete	Events	Heat		Final	
Athlete	Events	Time	Rank	Time	Rank
Laina Sithole	100 m T13	13.68	5	did not advance	

== Rowing ==
Rowing made a commitment to developing the sport in Africa, with three countries getting four totals berths to the Rio Games: Kenya, Zimbabwe and South Africa. Only the South African boat in the LTAMix4+ made it through to the finals.

Zimbabwe was granted a Bipartite Commission invitation for a team of four rowers plus a coxswain, to compete in the LTA4+, mixed coxed fours event.

Athlete(s)	Event	Heats		Repechage		Final	
Athlete(s)	Event	Time	Rank	Time	Rank	Time	Rank
Margret Bangajena; Michelle Garnett; Takudzwa Gwariro; Previous Wiri; Jessica Davis (C)	Mixed coxed four	4:08.63	6 R	4:13.76	5 FB	4:07.56	12

Qualification Legend: FA=Final A (medal); FB=Final B (non-medal); R=Repechage

== See also ==
- Zimbabwe at the 2016 Summer Olympics
