= Kathleen Comley =

British Paralympic archer

Personal information
- Nationality: British

Sport
- Country: United Kingdom
- Sport: Para-archery
Medal record
Paralympic Games
| Silver medal – second place | 1960 Rome | FITA round open |
| Bronze medal – third place | 1960 Rome | Windsor round open |

Kathleen Comley is a British Paralympic archer.

She competed at the 1960 Summer Paralympics where she won a silver medal in the Women's FITA round open event and a bronze medal in the Women's Windsor round open event.
