= Zimbabwe at the 2024 Summer Paralympics =

- Flag of Zimbabwe
- IPC code: ZIM
- NPC: Zimbabwe National Paralympic Committee

in Paris, France August 28, 2024 – September 8, 2024
- Competitors: 2 (1 man and 1 woman) in 1 sport
- Flag bearers: Tinotenda Nicole Bango; Kudakwashe Paidamoyo Chigwedere
- Medals: Gold 0 Silver 0 Bronze 0 Total 0

Summer Paralympics appearances (overview)
- 1960; 1964; 1968; 1972; 1976; 1980; 1984; 1988–1992; 1996; 2000; 2004; 2008; 2012; 2016; 2020; 2024

Zimbabwe competed at the 2024 Summer Paralympics in Paris, France, from 28 August to 8 September 2024. This was the nation's fourteenth time competing at the Summer Paralympic Games after it made its debut at the 1960 Summer Paralympics. The delegation consisted of two competitors from one sport.

== Competitors ==
The following is the list of number of competitors in the Games.

Sport	Men	Women	Total
Athletics	1	1	2
Total	1	1	2

== Athletics ==
Athlete	Event	Heat		Final	
Athlete	Event	Result	Rank	Result	Rank
Kudakwashe Paidamoyo Chigwedere	Men's 100 metres T47	10.78	3 Q	10.95	8
Tinotenda Nicole Bango	Women's 100 metres T47	13.71	9	Did not advance	

== See also ==
- Zimbabwe at the 2024 Summer Olympics
- Zimbabwe at the Paralympics
