= Annelie Ahrenstrand =

Swedish Paralympic swimmer

Personal information
- Born: 8 August 1964 (age 61) Stockholm, Sweden

Sport
- Sport: Paralympic swimming
Medal record
Representing Sweden
Paralympic Games
Gold medal – first place	1980 Arnhem	100m freestyle E
Gold medal – first place	1980 Arnhem	100m backstroke E
Gold medal – first place	1980 Arnhem	100m breaststroke E
Gold medal – first place	1980 Arnhem	100m butterfly E
Gold medal – first place	1980 Arnhem	4x50m individual medley E
Gold medal – first place	1984 Stoke Mandeville/New York	100m freestyle A8
Gold medal – first place	1984 Stoke Mandeville/New York	100m backstroke A8
Gold medal – first place	1984 Stoke Mandeville/New York	100m butterfly A8
Gold medal – first place	1984 Stoke Mandeville/New York	200m individual medley A8
Silver medal – second place	1984 Stoke Mandeville/New York	100m breaststroke A8

Annelie Ahrenstrand (born 8 August 1964) is a Swedish former Paralympic swimmer who competed at international swimming competitions. She competed at the 1980 Summer Paralympics where she won five gold medals and four gold medals in the 1984 Summer Paralympics. She won Sweden's Sportswoman of the Year in 1980.
