= Swimming at the 1980 Summer Paralympics – Women's 3 × 50 metre medley relay CP C =

Women's 3x50 metre medley relay CP C at the VI Paralympic Games
- Paralympic Swimming
- Competitors: 1 team from 1 nation

Medalists
1st place, gold medalist(s)		no medal awarded

The Women's 3x50 metre medley relay CP C was one of the events held in swimming at the 1980 Summer Paralympics in Arnhem.

Only one team, representing the United States, entered the race. In order to win gold, therefore, the team simply needed to complete the race. The Americans were disqualified, however; thus, no team completed the event, and no medals were awarded.

Rank	Athlete	Time
unranked	team (USA)	dq
