= Assaf Agmon =

Israeli Paralympic swimmer

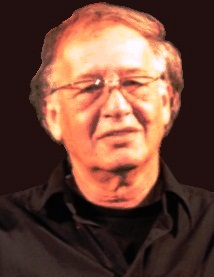

Personal information
- Native name: אסף אגמון
- Nationality: Israel

Sport
- Sport: Swimming
Medal record
Event / 1st / 2nd / 3rd; Paralympic Games / 2 / 4 / 2
Men's para swimming
Representing Israel
Paralympic Games
Gold medal – first place	1980 Arnhem	4X50m freestyle relay 2-6
Gold medal – first place	1984 Stoke Mandeville	3X50 medley relay
Silver medal – second place	1980 Arnhem	3X50m medley relay 2-4
Silver medal – second place	1980 Arnhem	25m butterfly 2
Silver medal – second place	1980 Arnhem	50m freestyle 2
Silver medal – second place	1984 Stoke Mandeville	4x50m freestyle relay 2-6
Bronze medal – third place	1980 Arnhem	3X25m ind. medley 2
Bronze medal – third place	1980 Arnhem	50m breaststroke 2

Assaf Agmon (Hebrew: אסף אגמון) is a former Israeli Paralympic swimmer.

== Biography ==
Agmon lived at Kibbutz Gesher HaZiv. He was injured during the War of Attrition.

He represented Israel at the Summer Paralympics as a member of the swimming teamfrom 1972 through 1988, winning medals at the 1980 Summer Paralympics and the 1984 Summer Paralympics. Overall he won at the Paralympics two gold medals, four silver medals and two bronze medals.

== See also ==
- Israel at the Paralympics
