= Zimbabwe at the 1984 Summer Paralympics =

- IPC code: ZIM
- NPC: Zimbabwe National Paralympic Committee

in Stoke Mandeville/New York
- Medals: Gold 0 Silver 1 Bronze 2 Total 3

Summer Paralympics appearances (overview)
- 1960; 1964; 1968; 1972; 1976; 1980; 1984; 1988–1992; 1996; 2000; 2004; 2008; 2012; 2016; 2020; 2024

Zimbabwe competed at the 1984 Summer Paralympics in Stoke Mandeville, United Kingdom and New York City, United States of America. The delegation consisted of Derrick Boshi, Mary Dube, Arthur James, D. Kloppers, F. Majole, R. Mukuya, and Eddie van der Heiden. van der Heiden won silver in the men's lawn bowls singles A2/4, Ndlovu won bronze in the women's discus 5, and Mukuya won bronze in the women's javelin 1B.
