= Zimbabwe at the 2020 Summer Paralympics =

- IPC code: ZIM
- NPC: Zimbabwe National Paralympic Committee

in Tokyo, Japan 24 August 2021 – 5 September 2021
- Competitors: 2 (2 women) in 1 sport
- Coaches: Mildred Baye
- Officials: Ignatius Vambe (chef de mission)
- Medals: Gold 0 Silver 0 Bronze 0 Total 0

Summer Paralympics appearances (overview)
- 1960; 1964; 1968; 1972; 1976; 1980; 1984; 1988–1992; 1996; 2000; 2004; 2008; 2012; 2016; 2020; 2024

Zimbabwe competed at the 2020 Summer Paralympics in Tokyo, Japan, from 24 August to 5 September 2021.

== Competitors ==
Two athletes from Zimbabwe competed at the Paralympics. The coach for both athletes was Mildred Baye, and the chef de mission for Zimbabwe was Ignatius Vambe.

Sport	Men	Women	Total
Athletics	0	2	2
Total	0	2	2

== Athletics ==
Both of Zimbabwe's athletes competed in athletics.

Athlete	Event	Heat		Final	
Athlete	Event	Result	Rank	Result	Rank
Pamela Vimbai Shumba	Women's 100 metres T12	15.43	4	Did not advance	
Vimbai Zvinowanda	Women's 200 metres T47	28.60	5	Did not advance	
