= Rhodesia and Nyasaland at the 1960 Summer Paralympics =

Rhodesia at the 1960 Summer Paralympics
- Flag of Southern Rhodesia
- IPC code: RHO

in Rome
- Competitors: 2 in ? sports
- Medals Ranked 11th: Gold 2 Silver 1 Bronze 2 Total 5

Summer Paralympics appearances (overview)
- 1960; 1964; 1968; 1972; 1976; 1980; 1984; 1988–1992; 1996; 2000; 2004; 2008; 2012; 2016; 2020; 2024

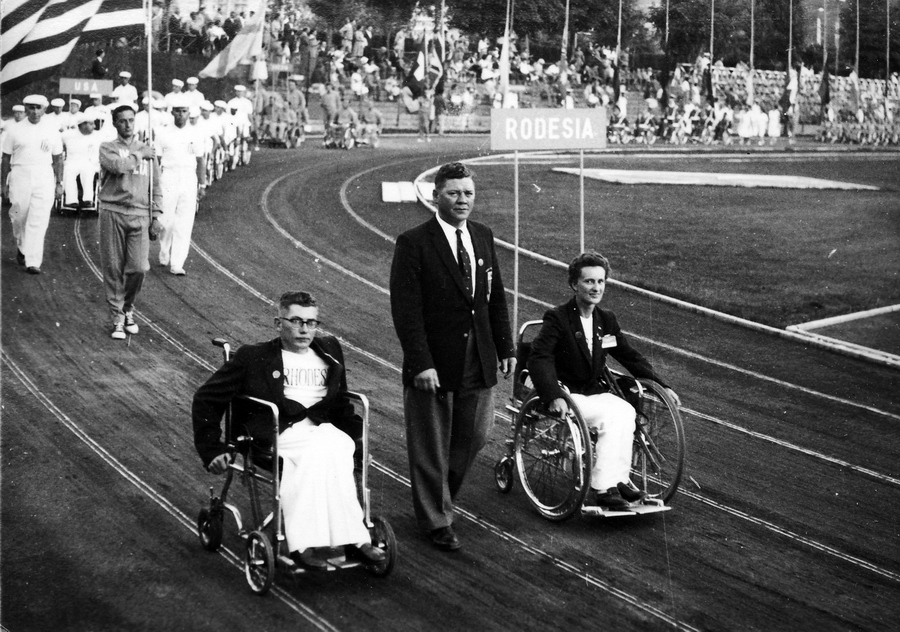
Rhodesia at Rome 1960

Rhodesia competed at the inaugural Summer Paralympic Games in 1960 in Rome. It was the only African country to take part. Rhodesia sent two competitors to the games, one of whom was Margaret Harriman, who competed in archery and swimming. Harriman won a total of five medals, placing her country 11th out of 17 on the medal table. She took gold in both the archery events she participated in, and won a silver medal and two bronze in swimming.

== Medallists ==
Medal	Name	Sport	Event
Gold	Margaret Harriman	Archery	Women's FITA round open
Gold	Margaret Harriman	Archery	Women's Windsor round open
Silver	Margaret Harriman	Swimming	Women's 50 metre crawl incomplete class 4
Bronze	Margaret Harriman	Swimming	Women's 50 metre backstroke incomplete class 4
Bronze	Margaret Harriman	Swimming	Women's 50 metre breaststroke incomplete class 4

== Archery ==
Harriman's strongest event was archery. She won gold in both the events she entered, and would go on to repeat the same performance at the 1964 Games.

In the women's FITA round open, she faced two British archers: Comley (first name not recorded) and R. Irvine. With 962 points, ahead of Comley's 534 and Irvine's 494, she finished in a very comfortable first place, to become Rhodesia's first Paralympic champion.

In the women's Windsor round open, she took on the same two competitors and emerged victorious with a comfortable lead: 726 points, to Irvine's 533 and Comley's 468.

== Swimming ==
Just like all other events at the 1960 Paralympics, swimming races were held with no more than three swimmers per event, thereby guaranteeing a medal to every swimmer completing his or her race. Harriman entered three 50m races in the incomplete class 4.

In the backstroke, she swam against the German Zander and the Argentinian Djukich. Zander won by a large margin, in 54.3s, while Djukich (1:35.9) outswam Harriman (1:46.2) for second place. In the breaststroke, Zander also won comfortably (1:05.0), but the race for second place was tighter. Edwards of Great Britain took silver in 1:55.6, while Harriman finished third and last in 1:58.9. She was more successful in the crawl. Though she was more than twenty seconds slower than Zander, who claimed gold in 50.5s, her time of 1:10.8 was well ahead of Argentinian swimmer Galan's 1:38.6, enabling her to claim silver.

== See also ==
- Rhodesia at the 1960 Summer Olympics
