= Rhodesia at the 1972 Summer Paralympics =

- Rhodesia used flag of the internationally recognised British subject Southern Rhodesia as a condition to participate.
- IPC code: RHO

in Heidelberg
- Competitors: 13 in 2 sports
- Medals Ranked 17th: Gold 3 Silver 5 Bronze 4 Total 12

Summer Paralympics appearances (overview)
- 1960; 1964; 1968; 1972; 1976; 1980; 1984; 1988–1992; 1996; 2000; 2004; 2008; 2012; 2016; 2020; 2024

Rhodesia competed at the 1972 Summer Paralympics in Heidelberg, West Germany. It was the last time the nation competed at the Paralympic Games before returning as Zimbabwe at the 1980 Summer Paralympics. The delegation consisted of 13 competitors in the sports of track and field athletics and swimming. Three athletes (Avril Davis, Sandra James, and Leslie Manson-Bishop) competed in both sports.

Rhodesia had also been invited to take part in the 1972 Summer Olympics, but the invitation was withdrawn by the International Olympic Committee four days before the opening ceremony, in response to African countries' protests against the Rhodesian regime. As the Paralympics that year were held before the Olympics, Rhodesia was able to take part in the Paralympic Games. Under conditions for participation from IOC, Rhodesia had to use British colonial flag and God Save the Queen as their anthem.

== Medalists ==
| Medal | Name | Sport | Event |
|---|---|---|---|
| Gold | Sandra James | Athletics | Women's javelin throw 1A |
| Gold | Sandra James | Swimming | Women's 25 m freestyle 1A |
| Gold | Andrew James Scott | Swimming | Men's 3×25 m individual medley 4 |
| Silver | Sandra James | Athletics | Women's shot put 1A |
| Silver | Sandra James | Swimming | Women's 25 m breaststroke 1A |
| Silver | Eileen Robertson | Swimming | Women's 25 m breaststroke 1B |
| Silver | Eileen Robertson | Swimming | Women's 25 m freestyle 1B |
| Silver | Andrew James Scott | Swimming | Men's 50 m backstroke 4 |
| Bronze | Sandra James | Athletics | Women's discus throw 1A |
| Bronze | Kevin English | Swimming | Men's 100 m backstroke 5 |
| Bronze | David Holland | Swimming | Men's 25 m freestyle 1B |
| Bronze | Andrew James Scott | Swimming | Men's 50 m breaststroke 4 |

== Athletics ==
| Athlete | Event | Result | Rank |
|---|---|---|---|
| Avril Davis | Women's discus throw 5 | 13.83 | 7 |
| Avril Davis | Women's javelin throw 5 | 10.72 | 8 |
| Avril Davis | Women's shot put 5 | 5.15 | 8 |
| Sandra James | Women's discus throw 1A | 6.00 | Bronze medal |
| Sandra James | Women's javelin throw 1A | 5.22 | Gold medal |
| Sandra James | Women's shot put 1A | 1.96 | Silver medal |
| Leslie Manson-Bishop | Men's discus throw 4 | 22.95 | 10 |
| Leslie Manson-Bishop | Men's javelin throw 4 | 20.08 | 6 |
| Leslie Manson-Bishop | Men's shot put 4 | 7.00 | 11 |
| Leslie Manson-Bishop | Men's pentathlon 4 | 3285 | 12 |
| Keith Pienaar | Men's discus throw 5 | 19.29 | 15 |
| Keith Pienaar | Men's javelin throw 5 | 15.36 | 22 |
| Keith Pienaar | Men's shot put 5 | 6.96 | 16 |
| Keith Pienaar | Men's pentathlon 5 | 2019 | 8 |

== Swimming ==
Men

| Athlete | Event | Heats | | Final | |
| Athlete | Event | Result | Rank | Result | Rank |
|---|---|---|---|---|---|
| Kevin English | 100 m backstroke 5 | 1:30.372 | 3 Q | 1:27.476 | Bronze medal |
| Kevin English | 100 m freestyle 5 | 1:33.125 | 11 | did not advance | |
| Kevin English | 3x50 m individual medley 5 | 2:50.735 | 8 | did not advance | |
| Derek Gray | 100 m breaststroke 5 | 2:08.286 | 6 Q | 2:00.708 | 5 |
| Derek Gray | 100 m freestyle 5 | 1:29.847 | 9 | did not advance | |
| Derek Gray | 3x50 m individual medley 5 | 2:00.042 | 12 | did not advance | |
| David Holland | 25 m backstroke 1B | 35.8 | 7 Q | 36.1 | 6 |
| David Holland | 25 m freestyle 1B | N/A | | 31.3 | Bronze medal |
| Leslie Manson-Bishop | 50 m backstroke 4 | 51.485 | 13 | did not advance | |
| Leslie Manson-Bishop | 50 m breaststroke 4 | 56.613 | 10 | did not advance | |
| Andrew James Scott | 50 m backstroke 4 | 42.798 | 3 Q | 42.307 | Silver medal |
| Andrew James Scott | 50 m breaststroke 4 | 49.745 | 2 Q | 50.304 | Bronze medal |
| Andrew James Scott | 3x25 m individual medley 4 | 1:12.3 | 2 Q | 1:10.6 | Gold medal |
| Unknown | 3x100 m medley relay 5–6 | N/A | | 5:01.982 | 6 |

Women

| Athlete | Event | Heats | | Final | |
| Athlete | Event | Result | Rank | Result | Rank |
|---|---|---|---|---|---|
| Avril Davis | 100 m backstroke 5 | 2:30.251 | 11 | did not advance | |
| Avril Davis | 100 m freestyle 5 | 2:09.517 | 9 | did not advance | |
| Stephanie Gillies | 25 m backstroke 2 | 39.6 | 9 | did not advance | |
| Stephanie Gillies | 25 m breaststroke 2 | 37.6 | 7 Q | 36.8 | 7 |
| Stephanie Gillies | 25 m freestyle 2 | 37.7 | 8 Q | 36.3 | 6 |
| Sandra James | 25 m backstroke 1A | N/A | | 1:47.3 | 6 |
| Sandra James | 25 m breaststroke 1A | N/A | | 1:13.3 | Silver medal |
| Sandra James | 25 m freestyle 1A | N/A | | 1:10.0 WR | Gold medal |
| Willemina Kruger | 100 m breaststroke 6 | 2:34.618 | 6 Q | 2:35.405 | 6 |
| Willemina Kruger | 100 m freestyle 6 | 1:49.463 | 7 Q | 1:47.612 | 7 |
| Lizette Nel | 25 m backstroke 2 | 48.1 | 17 | did not advance | |
| Lizette Nel | 25 m breaststroke 2 | 56.3 | 14 | did not advance | |
| Lizette Nel | 25 m freestyle 2 | 48.9 | 10 | did not advance | |
| Eileen Robertson | 25 m backstroke 1B | 45.0 | 6 | did not advance | |
| Eileen Robertson | 25 m breaststroke 1B | N/A | | 52.9 | Silver medal |
| Eileen Robertson | 25 m freestyle 1B | N/A | | 52.7 | Silver medal |
| Elizabeth Weppener | 100 m backstroke 5 | 2:03.550 | 8 | did not advance | |
| Elizabeth Weppener | 100 m freestyle 5 | 2:05.817 | 8 Q | 1:59.808 | 8 |
| Elizabeth Weppener | 3x25 m individual medley 4 | 1:33.4 | 4 Q | 1:48.8 | 6 |
