= Ron Bolotin =

Israeli paralympic swimming champion

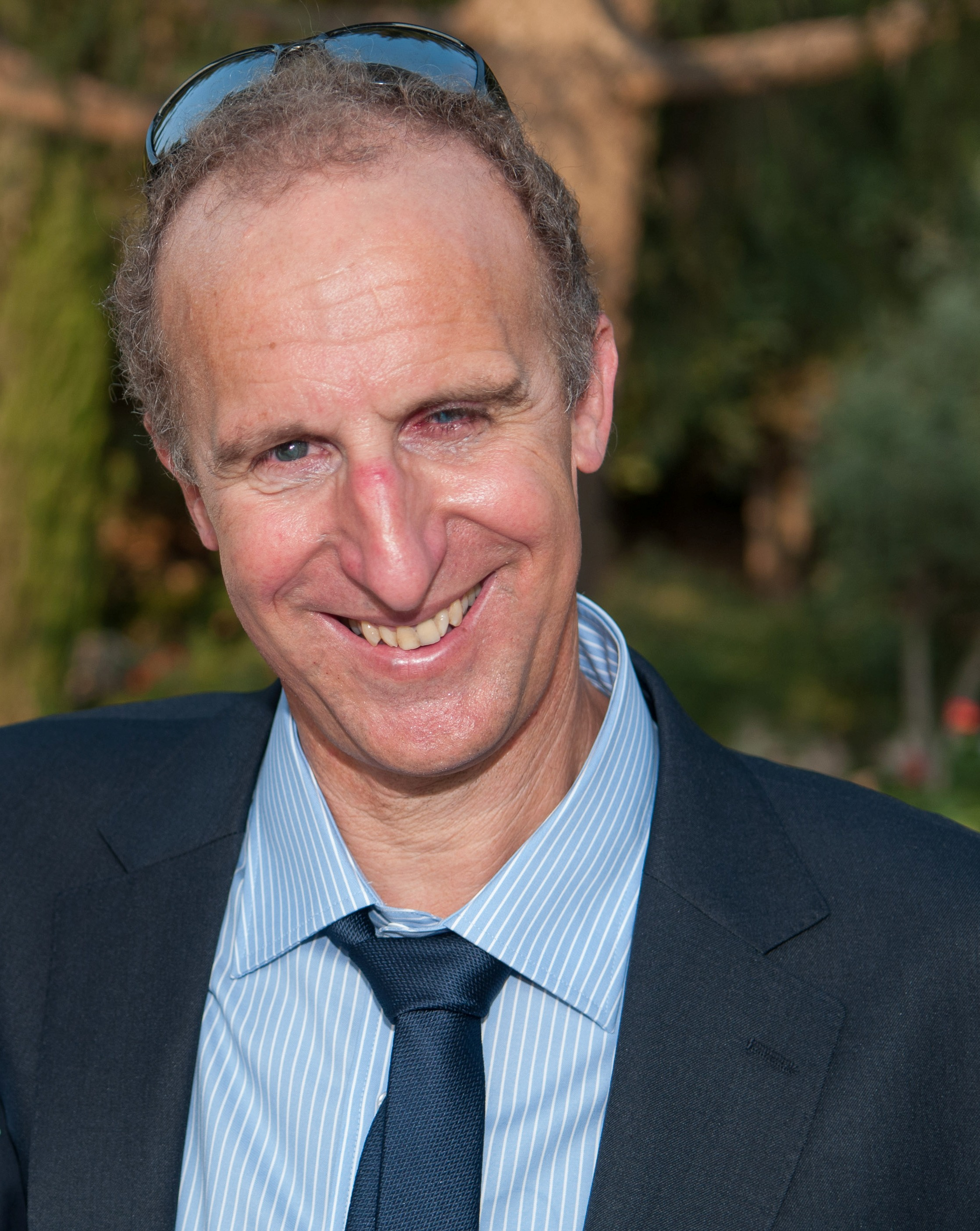

Personal information
- Native name: רון בולוטין

Sport
- Country: Israel
Medal record
Event / 1st / 2nd / 3rd; Paralympic Games / 3 / 5 / 3
Representing Israel
Summer Paralympic Games
Swimming
Gold medal – first place	1980 Arnhem	100m butterfly C
Gold medal – first place	1980 Arnhem	100m freestyle C-D
Gold medal – first place	1988 Seoul	100m butterfly A4
Silver medal – second place	1980 Arnhem	100m breaststroke C
Silver medal – second place	1984 New York	100m butterfly A4
Silver medal – second place	1984 New York	100m freestyle A4
Silver medal – second place	1988 Seoul	100m freestyle A4
Silver medal – second place	1988 Seoul	200m individual medley A4
Bronze medal – third place	1980 Arnhem	400m freestyle C-D
Bronze medal – third place	1984 New York	400m freestyle A4
Bronze medal – third place	1988 Seoul	400m freestyle A4
European championship
Swimming
Gold medal – first place	1979 Sweden	100m butterfly
Gold medal – first place	1986 Spain
Gold medal – first place	1990 Netherlands
National championship (Israel)
Swimming
Gold medal – first place	1976	butterfly

Ron (Roni) Bolotin (Hebrew: רון בולוטין) is an Israeli paralympic swimming champion.

Bolotin was born in Jerusalem. In his younger years he moved with his family to Beer Sheva and later to Tel Aviv, where he studied and began practicing competitive swimming. He was drafted to the IDF in 1975 and served in Sayeret Shaked. During a routine practice in the Sinai Peninsula, a landmine caused him to lose one of his legs. For several months Bolotin also lost his eyesight, which he later recovered.

In his rehabilitation, Bolotin returned to practice swimming and was a member of the national swimming team for the disabled. In 1976 he won the national championship and in 1979 the European championship, in which he also gained a world record for 100m butterfly. Between the years 1980 and 2000 he took part in six Paralympic Games and won 11 medals.

He was made coach of the national paralympic swimming team in 1988. Since 1989 he is also the head of the division for sports in the national company for community centers.

Bolotin is a graduate of business administration from Tel Aviv University and holds a MA and PhD in physical education.
