= Southern Rhodesia at the 1964 Summer Paralympics =

Rhodesia at the 1964 Summer Paralympics
- Flag of Southern Rhodesia
- IPC code: RHO

in Tokyo
- Competitors: 6
- Medals Ranked 5th: Gold 10 Silver 5 Bronze 2 Total 17

Summer Paralympics appearances (overview)
- 1960; 1964; 1968; 1972; 1976; 1980; 1984; 1988–1992; 1996; 2000; 2004; 2008; 2012; 2016; 2020; 2024

Rhodesia competed at the 1964 Summer Paralympics in Tokyo. It was one of two African countries to take part, the other being South Africa. It sent six competitors to the games, four male and two female. It won 17 medals, 10 gold, 5 silver and 2 bronze.

== Medals ==
Rhodesia was one of two African countries to finish in the top ten among all countries on the medal table. They won 17 medals, 10 gold, 5 silver and 2 bronze.

== Archery ==
Rhodesia entered only one competitor in the Archery event. She won two medals, both gold.

== Track and field (athletics) ==
Rhodesia entered three competitors in the athletics events.
