= Sandra James =

Zimbabwean former athlete

Sport
- Sport: Paralympic athletics Lawn bowls Paralympic swimming
Medal record
Representing Rhodesia
Paralympic Games
Gold medal – first place	1972 Heidelberg	Javelin 1A
Gold medal – first place	1972 Heidelberg	25m freestyle 1A
Silver medal – second place	1972 Heidelberg	Shot put 1A
Silver medal – second place	1972 Heidelberg	25m breaststroke 1A
Bronze medal – third place	1972 Heidelberg	Discus throw 1A
Representing Zimbabwe
Paralympic Games
Silver medal – second place	1980 Arnhem	Club throw 1A
Silver medal – second place	1980 Arnhem	Discus throw 1A
Silver medal – second place	1980 Arnhem	Shot put 1A
Silver medal – second place	1980 Arnhem	Pairs 1A-1B
Silver medal – second place	1980 Arnhem	25m breaststroke 1A
Silver medal – second place	1980 Arnhem	Singles 1A

Sandra James is a Zimbabwean former athlete, who won eleven medals across four different sports at the Paralympic Games.

== 1972: representing Rhodesia ==
James initially represented Rhodesia at the 1972 Summer Paralympics, competing in athletics and swimming.

In athletics, she entered the discus, javelin and shot put in the 1A category. In the discus, she took bronze with a throw of 6.00m, behind German and Argentinian competitors. In the javelin, her throw of 5.22m was well clear of any competition, enabling her to win the gold medal; J. Murland of Canada came second with 4.68m. In the shot put, Dutch athlete de Vries-Noordam dominated the field with a throw of 2.59, but James' result, 1.96m, was just enough for second place, ahead of Murland (1.91).

In swimming, she competed in three 25m races, also in the 1A category. In the backstroke, she finished sixth, a clear last, in 1:47.3, while Karen Donaldson of the USA set a world record in 39.8s. In the freestyle, she was the only competitor, and thus won gold simply by completing the race. Her time of 1:10.0 was, nonetheless, a world record. In the breaststroke, German swimmer Mayerhofer took a clear lead to win in 47s, but James' time of 1:13.3 was sufficient for silver, ahead of two other swimmers.

This was to be Rhodesia's last participation in the Paralympic Games. Shunned by much of the international community, the country was embroiled in the Rhodesian Bush War by the time of the 1976 Summer Paralympics, and did not take part. Rhodesia's successor state, Zimbabwe, began to participate in the Paralympics immediately upon coming into being, and Sandra James returned to the Paralympics as part of Zimbabwe's delegation to the 1980 Summer Paralympics.

== 1980: representing Zimbabwe ==
In 1980, James took part in athletics, swimming, lawn bowls and table tennis.

In athletics, she swept up three silver medals, in the discus, shot put and club throw events (1A category). She achieved a throw of 13.72m in the club, behind Josefina Cornejo's world record result of 18.05m for Mexico. In the discus, her result of 7.26m again placed her second behind Cornejo (8.42m), while in the shot put, her throw of 2.72m won her a third silver, behind Cornejo's Paralympic record throw of 2.94m.

In lawn bowls, she took part in the pairs' event in the 1A-1B category, with teammate Eileen Robertson. The event consisted in a single encounter, against M. McLellan and Jane Blackburn of Great Britain. The British pair won the match, leaving the Zimbabweans with a silver medal.

In swimming, James competed in the same events as eight years previously. In the backstroke, she came fourth and last by far, her time of 1:43.46 well behind third-placed Eugenia Garcia of Argentina (56.76s), while Donaldson of the USA set a world record in 35.09s. In the freestyle, she likewise finished fourth and last, in 1:10.69. In the breaststroke, however, she was one of only two competitors. Completing the event in 1:10.75, behind Garcia (1:00.82), she took silver.

In table tennis, James and Robertson were one of three pairs competing in the 1B category. They were defeated 0–3 by Norwegian team Marit Lysen and A. Klausen in the semi-finals. In the other semi-final, Mexico were non-starters against Ireland, resulting in a walkover. Norway defeated Ireland in the final, for gold; no bronze medal was awarded. James fared better in the singles, where she was one of three competitors in the 1A category. She lost 1–2 to J. Toomey of Ireland, but defeated Mexico's Josefina Cornejo 2–0, and won silver.

This was James' last participation in the Paralympic Games.
