= Czechoslovakia at the 1980 Summer Paralympics =

- IPC code: TCH

in Arnhem
- Competitors: 7
- Medals Ranked 37th: Gold 0 Silver 1 Bronze 1 Total 2

Summer Paralympics appearances (overview)
- 1972; 1976; 1980; 1984; 1988; 1992

Other related appearances
- Czech Republic (1994–); Slovakia (1994–)

Czechoslovakia competed at the 1980 Summer Paralympics in Arnhem, Netherlands. 7 competitors from Czechoslovakia won 2 medals, 1 silver and 1 bronze, and finished 37th in the medal table.

== See also ==
- Czechoslovakia at the Paralympics
- Czechoslovakia at the 1980 Summer Olympics
