= Rhodesia at the 1968 Summer Paralympics =

- This flag was used to represent Rhodesia. On 11 October 1968, a green and white tricolour was adopted.
- IPC code: RHO

in Tel Aviv
- Medals Ranked 11th: Gold 6 Silver 7 Bronze 7 Total 20

Summer Paralympics appearances (overview)
- 1960; 1964; 1968; 1972; 1976; 1980; 1984; 1988–1992; 1996; 2000; 2004; 2008; 2012; 2016; 2020; 2024

Rhodesia competed at the 1968 Summer Paralympics in Tel Aviv, Israel from 4 to 13 November 1968. The team ranked eleventh out of the twenty-eight competing nations in the medal table and won a total of twenty medals; six gold, seven silver and seven bronze. (Note: Data is taken from the International Paralympic Committee website and is based on information contained/sourced in the original hardcopy final results publications. Some information from earlier Paralympic Games (i.e. 1960 – 1984) is incomplete and is missing first names of some athletes) Rhodesia competed at the Paralympics in 1968 and in 1972 despite being excluded from the Summer Olympic Games in those years.

== Disability classifications ==
The Paralympics groups athletes' disabilities into one of five disability categories; amputation, the condition may be congenital or sustained through injury or illness; cerebral palsy; wheelchair athletes, there is often overlap between this and other categories; visual impairment, including blindness; Les autres, any physical disability that does not fall strictly under one of the other categories, for example dwarfism or multiple sclerosis. Each Paralympic sport then has its own classifications, dependent on the specific physical demands of competition. Events are given a code, made of numbers and letters, describing the type of event and classification of the athletes competing.

== Archery ==
Three of the Rhodesian delegation participated in archery events, none won a medal. Their best finish was sixth by Smit in the women's Albion round open, an event won by Margaret Harriman, who previously competed for Rhodesia at the 1960 Summer Paralympics.

== Athletics ==
Rhodesia won four athletics medals; Jacqueline Thompson won gold in the women's shot put B; Gesina Smit won the silver medal in C classification women's javelin; Bronze medals were won by Avril Davis in the women's D shot put and by Leslie Manson-Bishop in the men's pentathlon.

== Dartchery ==
The only dartchery event at the Games was the mixed pairs event which took a knockout format. The Rhodesian pair of Glynn Griffiths and George Mann was defeated in the first round by the Italian pair of Francesco Deiana and Raimondo Longhi.

== Snooker ==
One snooker event was contested at the Games, the men's open event. Keith Pienaar entered for Rhodesia. He was eliminated at the quarterfinal stage, the first round of the competition, by Aroldo Ruschioni of Italy. Michael Shelton of Great Britain won the gold medal.

== Swimming ==
Rhodesian swimmers won fifteen medals in Tel Aviv, five gold, six silver and four bronze. Sandra Coppard and Leslie Manson-Bishop each won two gold medals.

== See also ==
- Rhodesia at the Paralympics
