= Zimbabwe Rowing team at the 2016 Summer Paralympics =

The Zimbabwe Rowing team at the 2016 Summer Paralympics was the first rowing team to represent their country at a Paralympic Games. The team entered the para mixed coxed four finishing last in their event. The team consisted of rowers Margret Bangajena, Michelle Garnett, Takudzwa Gwariro and Previous Wiri and their cox Jessica Davis. Managed by Davis' mother, Rachel Davies, the team captured the imagination of the press due to the unlikely story of the crew's formation and the hardships they faced on reaching the 2016 Summer Paralympics in Rio de Janeiro.

== Formation ==
Rachel Davis, a Canadian sports administrator from Cambridge, Ontario, was assigned to Zimbabwe in 1996 by her employers, Fédération Internationale des Sociétés d'Aviron (FISA), where her role was to improve the sport of rowing in Africa. The following year she married a Zimbabwean, had a family and settled down in the country. In 2012 Davis successfully coached and registered two Zimbabwean rowers for the 2012 Summer Olympics in London, Micheen Thornycroft and James Fraser-Mackenzie. When Thornycrofy decided to part company from Davis to train permanently with the South African team, it left Davis with free time to spare, which resulted in a new FISA request. In an attempt to widen the appeal of rowing the International Paralympic Committee assigned four berths for African teams in the rowing program at the 2016 Summer Paralympics in Rio. Kenya and South Africa had already taken three of the positions, and FISA now asked Davis to put forward a Zimbabwe team for the last slot.

Davis had no experience in adaptive rowing, and Zimbabwe had no program either. With only two months before the Paralympic qualifying camp in Italy, Davis sent out a call on social media for people with disabilities who would be interested in rowing at the Paralympics. Eighteen people responded to her call, meeting at St. George's College, Harare where Davis taught. None had any rowing experience and most could not swim. The candidates had little understanding of competitive rowing, and one sixty year-old applicant arrived in her Sunday best, wearing a shower cap to protect her hair. Overwhelmed by the response, as Davis was expecting only a handful of responders, she decided to assemble a team rather than enter single scull events. Initially Davis was concerned about understanding how adaptive rowers were classified, but fortunately two physiotherapists turned up at the first meet hoping to help out the athletes for "Olympic trials", who were able to assess the volunteers.

The initial meet gave Davis three members of her mixed cox team, but she needed a second male member. Noticing that Takudzwa Gwariro, a fellow PE teacher at the school, walked with a limp, she inquired if he would like to join the team. He accepted, giving the team just three weeks to train together before the trials in Italy. The team's preparations for Italy were far from perfect, training on a dam which was home to crocodiles with having to use antiquated boats. Further problems came after a public transit boycott meant the rowers couldn't travel to the dam.

== Competition ==
The team that travelled to Italy consisted of Takudzwa Gwariro, Margret Bangajena, Previous Wiri, Chipo Zhento and Davis' daughter Jessica as their able-bodied cox. Their chances were almost dashed at the first hurdle after Zhento suffered a seizure. The team was asked to pull-out, but a Cameroon doctor, who knew the shame that would be brought onto Zheno's family if she caused the team to fail, cleared Zhento to compete. Although the team finished second to last, ahead of Japan, they qualified for Rio after being offered a bipartite invitation. After the team returned home Zhento suffered another seizure, and Davis was forced to find a replacement. With only a week before a World Cup race in Poland, an event the team had to compete in to show international competition experience, Michelle Garnett, was drafted in.

At the Rio Games, Zimbabwe finished sixth from a field of six in the heats, with a time of 4:08.63. In the Final B, they again finished in last place, but Davis stated that she was satisfied with the team's performance considering the limited time they team had to train together.

== Team ==
=== Margret Bangajena ===
Margret Bangajena (born 14 May 1977) answered the initial call for rowers, and rows in the bow seat. Bangajena had some experience in parasport having raced in wheelchair marathon events.

=== Michelle Garnett ===
Michelle Garnett (born 15 December 1998) was the youngest member of the Zimbabwe team at the Rio Paralympics. At the time of the Games Garnett was a student at Chisipite Senior School.

=== Takudzwa Gwariro ===
Takudzwa Gwariro (born 23 January 1996) was the final member recruited to join the initial team for the trials in Italy. A former rugby union player, Gwariro injured his leg in his last year of high school whilst playing the sport, resulting in nerve damage to his right foot which left him with a limp. At the time of the Rio Games he was working as a Physical Education teacher in Harare. At the Games he was given the honour of flag bearer at the opening ceremony. He has ambitions of studying law and attending university outside of Africa.

=== Previous Wiri ===
Previous Wiri (born 6 June 1987) was one of the athletes who turned up at the initial meet. Rowing from the stroke seat, Wiri had a long background in parasport having played wheelchair basketball and competed in para-swimming and wheelchair marathon events.

=== Jessica Davis ===
Jessica Davis (born 2 October 1998) was the team cox, and daughter of head coach Rachel Davis. Davis was the only able-bodied member of the squad and at the time of the Games she was a high school student at Peterhouse Girls' School.
