= Zimbabwe at the 1980 Summer Paralympics =

- IPC code: ZIM
- NPC: Zimbabwe National Paralympic Committee

in Arnhem
- Competitors: 5
- Medals Ranked 34th: Gold 0 Silver 8 Bronze 4 Total 12

Summer Paralympics appearances (overview)
- 1960; 1964; 1968; 1972; 1976; 1980; 1984; 1988–1992; 1996; 2000; 2004; 2008; 2012; 2016; 2020; 2024

Zimbabwe competed at the 1980 Summer Paralympics in Arnhem, Netherlands. 5 competitors from Zimbabwe won 12 medals, 8 silver and 4 bronze, and finished 34th in the medal table.

== See also ==
- Zimbabwe at the Paralympics
- Zimbabwe at the 1980 Summer Olympics
