= Elliot Mujaji =

Zimbabwean Paralympic athlete

Medal record

Athletics

Paralympic Games
Gold medal – first place	2000 Sydney	100m T46
Gold medal – first place	2004 Athens	100m T46

Elliot Mujaji is a retired Zimbabwean track and field athlete. He grew up in Alska mine, near Chinhoyi

A member of Zimbabwe's national athletics team, he qualified to compete at the 1998 Commonwealth Games before suffering severe burns in an electrical accident while at work. His right arm was amputated, and he remained in a coma for two months.

After recovering, he resumed training, and qualified to compete at the 2000 Summer Paralympics in Sydney. He was the fastest runner in the heats of the 200 metres sprint, but was disqualified for having encroached on another lane. He won gold in the 100 metres sprint - Zimbabwe's first ever Paralympic gold medal.

Mujaji competed again at the 2004 Summer Paralympics, and once again won gold in the 100 metres sprint. He also took part in the 2008 and 2012 editions of the Paralympics for the third and fourth time, competing in the 100m and 200m sprints in Beijing and 100m in London.
