= Zimbabwe National Paralympic Committee =

National Paralympic Committee
- Country: Zimbabwe
- Code: ZIM
- Created: 2010
- President: Witness Magulula
- Secretary General: Peter Mawindo
- Website: www.zimparalympic.org

The Zimbabwe National Paralympic Committee (ZNPC) is responsible for Zimbabwe's participation in the Paralympic Games, and for overseeing disability sports in the country. Its mission it to support athletes with disabilities "competing at both the grassroots and elite levels".

The Zimbabwe National Paralympic Committee was only officially launched and registered in 2010. Prior to this, "the government provided financial aid during the Paralympic Games, [but] there was no co-ordinated mechanism to maintain athletes' momentum between the Games", and athletes "had to find their own sponsor, coach and manager who would finance the training, travelling and their participation at competitions".

== See also ==
- Zimbabwe at the Paralympics
- Zimbabwe Olympic Committee
